= Imagination discography =

- Studio albums: 7
- Compilation albums: 13
- Singles: 32
- Video albums: 7
- Music videos: 20
- Remix albums: 3

The discography of British post-disco/funk band Imagination consists of 7 studio albums, 13 compilation albums, 3 remix albums, and 7 video releases.

== Albums ==
=== Studio albums ===
Album	Details	Peak positions										Certifications
Album	Details	UK	AUT	FRA	GER	IT	NL	NOR	SPA	SWE	US R&B	Certifications
Body Talk	Released: 9 October 1981; Label: R&B	20	—	1	37	4	—	21	6	7	46	FRA: Gold; UK: Gold
In the Heat of the Night	Released: 3 September 1982; Label: R&B	7	16	1	6	5	12	26	4	16	45	FRA: Platinum; UK: Gold
Scandalous	Released: 4 November 1983; Label: R&B; Re-titled New Dimension for the US market	25	—	12	49	—	16	—	20	—	44	UK: Gold
Trilogy	Released: 1986; Label: Red Bus	—	—	—	—	—	—	—	—	—	—	
Closer	Released: 8 February 1988; Label: RCA	—	—	—	—	—	70	—	—	—	—	
The Fascination of the Physical	Released: 1992; Label: Castle Communications	—	—	—	—	—	—	—	—	—	—	
Retropia	Released: 21 October 2016 (France); 9 June 2017 (UK); Label: Cristal; Released as 'Imagination featuring Leee John'	—	—	—	—	—	—	—	—	—	—	
"—" denotes releases that did not chart or were not released

=== Remix albums ===
Album	Details	Peak positions					Certifications
Album	Details	UK	FRA	IT	GER	NL	Certifications
Night Dubbing	Released: 6 May 1983; Label: R&B	9	14	23	33	24	UK: Gold
All the Hits – Hot Sensational Re-Mixes	Released: August 1989; Label: Stylus Music, RCA; Released outside the UK as Like It Is – Revised and Remixed Classics	4	5 (Note: Peak position on the Compilations Chart.)	—	—	—	FRA: Gold; UK: Gold
Night Dubbing II	Released: 31 October 2014; Label: ISM	—	—	—	—	—	
"—" denotes releases that did not chart or were not released

=== Compilation albums ===
Title	Details	Peak chart positions		Certifications
Title	Details	FRA	NL	Certifications
Gold	Released: 26 October 1984; Label: R&B	—	—	
The Best of Imagination	Released: September 1985; Label: Arcade; Netherlands-only release	—	28	
The Love Songs	Released: 1990; Label: RCA	—	—	
Flashback	Released: 19 October 1992; Label: Pickwick Music	—	—	
The Very Best of Imagination	Released: 1994; Label: BR Music	—	—	
Best of Imagination	Released: 1995; Label: Versailles; France-only release	5	—	FRA: Gold
Double Gold	Released: June 1999; Label: Arcade; Netherlands-only release	—	69	
The Very Best of Imagination	Released: October 2000; Label: Music Club	—	—	
Golden Hits	Released: October 2004; Label: MCP Sound & Media	—	—	
Just an Illusion – The Best Of	Released: July 2006; Label: Music Club Deluxe	—	—	
Burnin' Up – The Greatest Hits	Released: 2009; Label: Spectre	—	—	
Flashback – The Very Best of Imagination	Released: 7 October 2013; Label: Sony Music	—	—	
Greatest Hits	Released: June 2014; Label: Wagram Music; France-only release	212	—	
"—" denotes releases that did not chart or were not released

== Singles ==
Single	Year	Peak chart positions										Certifications	Album
Single	Year	UK	BE	FRA	GER	IRE	IT	NL	SWI	US Dance	US R&B	Certifications	Album
"Body Talk"	1981	4	25	10	—	9	12	16	—	—	—	UK: Silver	Body Talk
"In and Out of Love"	1981	16	—	—	—	20	—	—	—	—	—		Body Talk
"Flashback"	1981	16	—	30	—	—	—	—	—	—	—		Body Talk
"Just an Illusion"	1982	2	9	3	7	8	2	12	2	15	27	FRA: Gold; UK: Silver	In the Heat of the Night
"Burnin' Up" (US-only release)	1982	—	—	—	—	—	—	—	—	6	68		Body Talk
"So Good, So Right" (Japan-only release)	1982	—	—	—	—	—	—	—	—	—	—		Body Talk
"Music and Lights"	1982	5	10	1	18	5	1	16	9	—	52	FRA: Gold; UK: Gold	In the Heat of the Night
"In the Heat of the Night"	1982	22	27	19	48	11	—	18	—	—	—		In the Heat of the Night
"Changes"	1982	31	16	—	43	—	—	26	—	66	46		In the Heat of the Night
"Follow Me" (Italy-only release)	1982	—	—	—	—	—	15	—	—	—	—		Non-album single
"Looking at Midnight"	1983	29	—	—	—	26	17	36	—	—	64		Scandalous
"New Dimension"	1983	56	13	—	61	—	14	21	—	—	—		Scandalous
"This Means War (Shoo Be Doo Da Dabba Doobee)"	1984	—	—	—	—	—	—	43	—	22	29		Scandalous
"State of Love"	1984	67	—	—	—	—	—	—	—	13	—		Scandalous
"Thank You My Love"	1984	22	—	—	—	—	—	—	—	—	—		Trilogy
"Found My Girl"	1985	83	—	—	—	—	—	—	—	—	—		Trilogy
"Last Days of Summer"	1985	99	—	—	—	—	—	—	—	—	—		Trilogy
"Breathless" (Italy-only release)	1985	—	—	—	—	—	—	—	—	—	—		Trilogy
"Sunshine"	1986	87	36	—	—	—	—	—	—	—	—		Trilogy
"Streetmix" (12-inch medley)	1986	—	—	—	—	—	—	—	—	—	—		Non-album single
"The Last Time"	1987	93	—	—	—	—	—	—	—	—	88		Closer
"I Know What Love Is"	1987	109	—	—	—	—	—	—	—	—	—		Closer
"Instinctual"	1987	62	34	—	—	—	—	48	—	1	—		Closer
"Hold Me in Your Arms"	1988	112	—	—	—	—	—	—	—	—	—		Closer
"Just an Illusion" (1989 remix)	1989	—	—	—	—	—	—	—	—	—	—		All the Hits – Hot Sensational Re-Mixes
"Love's Taking Over"	1989	100	—	—	—	—	—	—	29	—	—		All the Hits – Hot Sensational Re-Mixes
"Megamix"	1989	—	—	6	—	—	—	—	24	—	—	FRA: Silver	Like It Is – Revised and Remixed Classics
"I Like It"	1991	—	—	—	—	—	—	—	—	—	—		The Fascination of the Physical
"Loving Tight"	1992	—	—	—	—	—	—	—	—	—	—		The Fascination of the Physical
"Call on Me"	1992	—	—	—	—	—	—	—	—	—	—		The Fascination of the Physical
"Secrets" (featuring Leee John)	2016	—	—	—	—	—	—	—	—	—	—		Retropia
"Do It Right Now" (featuring Leee John)	2017	—	—	—	—	—	—	—	—	—	—		Retropia
"—" denotes releases that did not chart or were not released

== Videos ==
=== Video releases ===
Title	Details
Music & Lights – Imagination in Concert	Released: November 1982; Label: Precision Video; Medium: VHS, Betamax, LaserDisc; Live material filmed at The Dominion, London
Video E.P.	Released: October 1983; Label: Red Bus; Medium: VHS, Betamax; Promo videos
In Concert	Released: 1985; Label: The Video Collection; Medium: VHS, Betamax; Live material
Live in Concert	Released: 1990; Label: Renegade Video; Medium: VHS; Live material
Best Of	Released: 1995; Label: Sony Music; Medium: VHS; Promo videos; France-only release
The Very Best of Imagination	Released: 19 March 2004; Label: Fonte; Medium: DVD; Promo videos and live material; Italy-only release
Live	Released: 2006; Label: IMPH; Medium: DVD; Live material; Germany-only release

=== Music videos ===
Title	Year
"Body Talk"	1981
"In and Out of Love"	1981
"Flashback"	1981
"Just an Illusion"	1982
"Burnin' Up"	1982
"Music and Lights"	1982
"In the Heat of the Night"	1982
"Changes"	1982
"Heart 'n Soul"	1982
"Follow Me"	1982
"Follow Me"	1982
"Looking at Midnight"	1983
"New Dimension"	1983
"State of Love"	1984
"Thank You My Love"	1984
"The Last Time"	1987
"I Know What Love Is"	1987
"Instinctual"	1988
"Hold Me in Your Arms"	1988
"Loving Tight"	1991
