= Night Dubbing =

Remix album by Imagination
- Released: 6 May 1983
- Recorded: 1981–1982
- Studio: Red Bus (London)
- Genre: Post-disco; funk; soul
- Length: 41:53
- Label: R&B
- Producer: Jolley & Swain

Imagination chronology
In the Heat of the Night (1982)	Night Dubbing (1983)	Scandalous (1983)

Night Dubbing is the debut remix album by British soul/dance group Imagination, produced by Steve Jolley and Tony Swain and released in 1983. The album consists of dub remixes of tracks from Imagination's first two albums, Body Talk and In the Heat of the Night, and reached No 9 on the UK Albums chart.

All tracks from this album are available on the United Kingdom 2CD compilation set Just an Illusion: The Very Best of Imagination.

== Reception ==
A review of the album in The Times stated it was "...a fascinating primer in the resources of the contemporary recording studio."

Andy Kellman of Allmusic rated the album 3.5 out of 5 stars and said: "Though it hits more often than it misses, Night Dubbing is of value to DJs and completists only."

In 2014, a review in Mixmag stated "Imagination’s groundbreaking, proto-house album ‘Night Dubbing’ was a milestone in production and marked the evolution of disco into house thanks to its rich and buzzy electronics."

In 2017, Diego Olivas described the album as "the sound of Imagination stretching to the outer limits the expanse of their pioneering slinky electro-soul, using the techniques of dub and post-disco, and coming out the other end with something far more unexpected and intriguing."

Professional ratings
Review scores
Source	Rating
Allmusic	3.5/5 stars
Encyclopedia of Popular Music	2/5 stars
Number One	3/5 stars
Record Mirror	2/5 stars

== Track listing ==
Side one
No.	Title	Writer(s)	Length
1.	"Flashback"	Steve Jolley, Tony Swain, Leee John, Ashley Ingram, Errol Kennedy	4:50
2.	"Just an Illusion"	Jolley, Swain, John, Ingram	6:37
3.	"Music and Lights"	Jolley, Swain, John, Ingram	5:35
4.	"So Good, So Right"	Jolley, Swain, John, Ingram, Kennedy	4:37

Side two
No.	Title	Writer(s)	Length
5.	"Body Talk"	Jolley, Swain, John, Ingram	4:46
6.	"Heart 'n' Soul"	Jolley, Swain, John, Ingram	4:09
7.	"Changes"	Jolley, Swain, John, Ingram	6:27
8.	"Burnin' Up"	Jolley, Swain, John, Ingram, Kennedy	4:52
Total length:			41:53

== Personnel ==
Technical

- Steve Jolley – producer, arrangement, remix (all except 7)
- Tony Swain – producer, arrangement, remix (all except 7)
- Richard Lengyel – remix (all except 7)
- Larry Levan – remix (7)
- Tony Bridge – mastering
- Diane Waller – cover design, production and direction
- Tim Gates – cover design, production and direction
- Phil Surbey – photography
- All tracks remixed at Red Bus Studios, London, except "Changes", remixed at Electric Lady Studios, New York
