= List of songs recorded by Destiny's Child =

This is a chronological list of officially released and leaked songs by the American R&B-Pop group Destiny's Child.

== Released songs ==
Key
†	Indicates single release
‡	Indicates song included on an alternative version of the album

Song	Artist(s)	Writer(s)	Originating album (Note: An asterisk beside an album title denotes the song to be available as a bonus track on certain editions of said album.)	Year	Ref.
"2 Step"	Destiny's Child	Beyoncé; Kelly Rowland; Michelle Williams; Robert Waller; Scott Storch; Sean Garrett	Destiny Fulfilled ‡	2004	
"8 Days of Christmas" †	Destiny's Child	Beyoncé; Errol "Poppi" McCalla	8 Days of Christmas	2001	
"Amazing Grace"	Destiny's Child	John Newton	Destiny's Child ‡	1998	
"Apple Pie à la Mode"	Destiny's Child	Beyoncé; Rob Fusari; Falonte Moore	Survivor	2001	
"Bad Habit"	Destiny's Child	Kelly Rowland; Kendrick Dean; Solange Knowles; Bryan-Michael Cox	Destiny Fulfilled	2004	
"Big Momma's Theme"	Da Brat and Vita featuring Destiny's Child	Da Brat; Jermaine Dupri; Tamara Savage; Taheem Crocker; Bryan-Michael Cox	Big Momma's House	2000	
"Bills, Bills, Bills" †	Destiny's Child	Beyoncé; Kelly Rowland; LeToya Luckett; Kandi Burruss; Kevin "She'kspere" Briggs	The Writing's on the Wall	1999	
"Birthday"	Destiny's Child	Beyoncé; Kelly Rowland; LaTavia Roberson; D'wayne Wiggins	Destiny's Child	1998	
"Bootylicious" †	Destiny's Child	Beyoncé; Rob Fusari; Stevie Nicks; Falonte Moore	Survivor	2001	
"Bridges"	Destiny's Child	Al Green; Michelle Hailey; D'wayne Wiggins	Destiny's Child	1998	
"Brown Eyes"	Destiny's Child	Beyoncé; Walter Afanasieff	Survivor	2001	
"Bug a Boo" †	Destiny's Child	Beyoncé; Kelly Rowland; LaTavia Roberson; LeToya Luckett; Kandi Burruss; Kevin "She'kspere" Briggs	The Writing's on the Wall	1999	
"Can't Stop" †	Lil' O featuring Destiny's Child	Lil' O Beyoncé; Steve Nichol; Jane Eugene; Carl McIntosh; Derek Edwards	—	1997	
"Cater 2 U" †	Destiny's Child	Beyoncé; Kelly Rowland; Michelle Williams; Robert Waller; Rodney Jerkins; Ricky "Ric Rude" Lewis	Destiny Fulfilled	2004	
"Confessions"	Destiny's Child featuring Missy Elliott	Missy Elliott; Donald Holmes; Gerard Thomas	The Writing's on the Wall	1999	
"Dance with Me"	Destiny's Child	Beyoncé; Soulshock; Kenneth Karlin	Survivor ‡	2001	
"Dangerously in Love"	Destiny's Child	Beyoncé; Errol "Poppi" McCalla	Survivor	2001	
"A "DC" Christmas Medley"	Destiny's Child	Gene Autry; Steve Nelson; Johnny Marks; Haven Gillespie; Thomas Oliphant; Oakley Haldeman; James Lord Pierpont; John Frederick Coots; Walter E. "Jack" Rollins	8 Days of Christmas	2001	
"Do It Again"	Cam'ron featuring Destiny's Child and Jimmy Jones	Cam'ron; Beyoncé; Jim Jones; Darrell Branch	S.D.E.	2000	
"Dot"	Destiny's Child	Beyoncé; Errol "Poppi" McCalla	Charlie's Angels	2000	
"Emotion" †	Destiny's Child	Barry Gibb; Robin Gibb	Survivor	2001	
"Fancy"	Destiny's Child	Beyoncé; J. R. Rotem; D'wayne Wiggins	Survivor	2001	
"Feel the Same Way I Do"	Destiny's Child	Beyoncé; Kelly Rowland; Michelle Williams; Rodney Jerkins; Ricky Lewis; Fred Jerkins III; LaShawn Daniels	#1's	2005	
"Free"	Destiny's Child	Beyoncé; Kelly Rowland; Michelle Williams; James Carter; Big Drawers; Rockwilder; Larry Mizell; Fonce Mizell	Destiny Fulfilled	2004	
"Game Over"	Destiny's Child	Beyoncé; Kelly Rowland; Michelle Williams; Sean Garrett; Phil Terry; 9th Wonder; Michael Burton	Destiny Fulfilled ‡	2004	
"Get on the Bus" †	Destiny's Child featuring Timbaland	Timbaland; Missy Elliott	Why Do Fools Fall in Love	1998	
"Girl" †	Destiny's Child	Beyoncé; Kelly Rowland; Michelle Williams; Angela Beyince; Eddie Robinson; Michael Burton; 9th Wonder; Don Davis; Sean Garrett	Destiny Fulfilled	2004	
"Good to Me"	Mary Mary featuring Destiny's Child	Tina Campbell; Erica Campbell; Curtis Mayfield; Warryn Campbell	Thankful	2000	
"Gospel Medley"	Destiny's Child	Beyoncé; Kirk Franklin; Richard Smallwood	Survivor	2001	
"Got's My Own"	Destiny's Child	Beyoncé; Kelly Rowland; Michelle Williams; Rodney Jerkins; Fred Jerkins III; Sean Garrett; LaShawn Daniels	Destiny Fulfilled ‡	2004	
"Happy Face"	Destiny's Child	Beyoncé; Bill Lee; Rob Fusari; Calvin Gaines; Falonte Moore	Survivor	2001	
"Hey Ladies"	Destiny's Child	Beyoncé; Kelly Rowland; LaTavia Roberson; LeToya Luckett; Kandi Burruss; Kevin "She'kspere" Briggs	The Writing's on the Wall	1999	
"Home for the Holidays"	Destiny's Child	Beyoncé; Jesse J. Rankins; Solange Knowles; Jonathan D. Wells; Eddie “E-Trez” Smith III	8 Days of Christmas ‡	2001	
"I Can't Go for That"	Destiny's Child	Alvin West; Kirk Howell; Marlon Bryan; Shaarod Ford; Curtis Jackson; Nycolia Turman; Channoah Higgens; Channette Higgens	—	1999	
"I Know"	Destiny's Child	Beyoncé; Corte Ellis; Jully Black; Karriem Mack; LaShaun Owens	The Fighting Temptations	2003	
"If"	Destiny's Child	Beyoncé; Kelly Rowland; Michelle Williams; Charles Jackson; Big Drawers; Rockwilder; Marvin Yancy	Destiny Fulfilled	2004	
"If You Leave"	Destiny's Child featuring Next	RL; Chad Elliot; Oshea Hunter; Nicolia Turman	The Writing's on the Wall	1999	
"Illusion" †	Destiny's Child featuring Wyclef Jean and Pras	Leee John; Tony Swain; Steve Jolley; Isaac Hayes; Ashley Ingram	Destiny's Child	1998	
"Independent Women Part I" †	Destiny's Child	Beyoncé; Cory Rooney; Samuel Barnes; Jean-Claude Olivier	Charlie's Angels	2000	
"Independent Women Part II"	Destiny's Child	Beyoncé; Eric Seats; Rapture Stewart; Frank Comstock; David Donaldson	Survivor	2001	
"Intro (The Writing's on the Wall)"	Destiny's Child	Beyoncé; Kelly Rowland; LeToya Luckett; LaTavia Roberson	The Writing's on the Wall	1999	
"Is She the Reason"	Destiny's Child	Beyoncé; Kelly Rowland; Michelle Williams; John Whitehead; Sean Garrett; 9th Wonder; Gene McFadden; Victor Carstarphen	Destiny Fulfilled	2004	
"Jumpin', Jumpin'" †	Destiny's Child	Beyoncé; Chad Elliot; Rufus Moore	The Writing's on the Wall	1999	
"Just Be Straight with Me" †	Silkk the Shocker featuring Master P, Destiny's Child, O'Dell and Mo B. Dick	Silkk the Shocker; Master P Beyoncé; Kelly Rowland; LaTavia Roberson; LeToya Luckett; O'Dell; Mo B. Dick	Charge It 2 da Game	1998	
"Killing Time"	Destiny's Child	Taura Stinson; D'wayne Wiggins	Destiny's Child	1998	
"Know That"	Destiny's Child	Rachel Oden; Andre Robinson	Destiny's Child ‡	1998	
"Little Drummer Boy"	Destiny's Child featuring Solange	Henry Onorati; Harry Simeone; Katherine Kennicott Davis	8 Days of Christmas	2001	
"Lose My Breath" †	Destiny's Child	Beyoncé; Kelly Rowland; Michelle Williams; Sean Garrett; LaShawn Daniels; Rodney Jerkins; Fred Jerkins III; Jay-Z	Destiny Fulfilled	2004	
"Love"	Destiny's Child	Beyoncé; Kelly Rowland; Michelle Williams; Angela Beyince; Erron Williams	Destiny Fulfilled	2004	
"My Man"	Destiny's Child	Beyoncé; Scott Storch; Robert Waller; Angela Beyince	Destiny Fulfilled ‡	2004	
"My Time Has Come"	Destiny's Child	Reed Vertelney; Sylvia Bennett-Smith	Destiny's Child	1998	
"Nasty Girl" †	Destiny's Child	Beyoncé; Anthony Dent; Maurizio Bassi; Naimy Hackett	Survivor	2001	
"No More Rainy Days"	Destiny's Child	Beyoncé; Kelly Rowland; LaTavia Roberson; Vincent Herbert; Rob Fusari; Calvin Gaines	The PJs	1999	
"No, No, No Part 1" †	Destiny's Child	Rob Fusari; Mary Brown; Calvin Gaines; Vincent Herbert	Destiny's Child	1998	
"No, No, No Part 2" †	Destiny's Child featuring Wyclef Jean	Rob Fusari; Barry White; Mary Brown; Calvin Gaines; Vincent Herbert	Destiny's Child	1998	
"Now That She's Gone"	Destiny's Child	Latrelle; Tara Geter; Ken Fambro; Aleese Simmons; Donnie Boynton	The Writing's on the Wall	1999	
"Nuclear"	Destiny's Child	Michelle Williams; Pharrell Williams; James Fauntleroy; Lonny Bereal	Love Songs	2013	
"Once a Fool"	Destiny's Child	Beyoncé; The Characters; William Floyd; Darroll Durant; Buddah Epitome	NFL Jams	1998	
"Opera of the Bells"	Destiny's Child	Peter Wilhousky; Mykola Leontovych	8 Days of Christmas	2001	
"Outro (Amazing Grace)"	Destiny's Child	Beyoncé; John Newton	The Writing's on the Wall	1999	
"Outro (DC-3) Thank You"	Destiny's Child	Beyoncé; Kelly Rowland; Michelle Williams; Calvin Gaines; Bill Lee; Rob Fusari	Survivor	2001	
"Perfect Man"	Destiny's Child	Beyoncé; Eric Seats; Rapture Stewart	Survivor ‡	2001	
"Platinum Bells"	Destiny's Child	Ray Evans; Jay Livingston	8 Days of Christmas	2001	
"The Proud Family"	Solange featuring Destiny's Child	Kurt Farquhar; Gerald Harbour	8 Days of Christmas ‡	2001	
"Rudolph the Red-Nosed Reindeer"	Destiny's Child	Johnny Marks	8 Days of Christmas ‡	2001	
"Sail On"	Destiny's Child	Lionel Richie	Destiny's Child	1998	
"Say My Name" †	Destiny's Child	Beyoncé; Kelly Rowland; LaTavia Roberson; LeToya Luckett; Fred Jerkins III; Rodney Jerkins; LaShawn Daniels	The Writing's on the Wall	1999	
"Say Yes" †	Michelle Williams featuring Beyoncé and Kelly Rowland	Michelle Williams; Carmen Reece; Harmony Samuels; Al Sherrod Lambert	Journey to Freedom	2014	
"Second Nature"	Destiny's Child	Terry T Ernie Isley; Marvin Isley; Ronald Isley; Rudolph Isley; O'Kelly Isley Jr. Chris Jasper; Kymberli Armstrong	Destiny's Child	1998	
"Sexy Daddy"	Destiny's Child	Beyoncé; Damon Elliott	Survivor	2001	
"She Can't Love You"	Destiny's Child	Beyoncé; Kelly Rowland; LaTavia Roberson; LeToya Luckett; Kandi Burruss; Kevin "She'kspere" Briggs	The Writing's on the Wall	1999	
"She's Gone" †	Matthew Marsden featuring Destiny's Child	Daryl Hall; John Oates	Say Who	1998	
"Show Me the Way"	Destiny's Child	Carl Breeding; Darcy Aldridge; Jeffrey Bowden	Destiny's Child	1998	
"So Good"	Destiny's Child	Beyoncé; Kelly Rowland; LaTavia Roberson; LeToya Luckett; Kandi Burruss; Kevin "She'kspere" Briggs	The Writing's on the Wall	1999	
"Soldier" †	Destiny's Child featuring T.I. and Lil Wayne	Beyoncé; Kelly Rowland; Michelle Williams; Sean Garrett; Rich Harrison; Lil Wayne; T.I.	Destiny Fulfilled	2004	
"Spread a Little Love on Christmas Day"	Destiny's Child	Beyoncé; Focus...	8 Days of Christmas	2001	
"Stand Up for Love" †	Destiny's Child	David Foster; Amy S. Foster	#1's	2005	
"Stay"	Destiny's Child	Daryl Simmons	The Writing's on the Wall	1999	
"Stimulate Me"	Destiny's Child featuring Mocha	Mocha; R. Kelly	Life	1999	
"The Story of Beauty"	Destiny's Child	Beyoncé; Ken Fambro	Survivor	2001	
"Survivor" †	Destiny's Child	Beyoncé; Anthony Dent; Mathew Knowles	Survivor	2001	
"Sweet Sixteen"	Destiny's Child	Beyoncé; Kelly Rowland; Jody Watley; D'wayne Wiggins	The Writing's on the Wall	1999	
"T-Shirt"	Destiny's Child	Beyoncé; Kelly Rowland; Michelle Williams; Sean Garrett; Angela Beyince; Andre Harris; Vidal Davis	Destiny Fulfilled	2004	
"Tell Me"	Destiny's Child	Tim Kelley; Bob Robinson	Destiny's Child	1998	
"Temptation"	Destiny's Child	Beyoncé; Kelly Rowland; LaTavia Roberson; LeToya Luckett; Carl Wheeler; Sir Mix-a-Lot; D'wayne Wiggins	The Writing's on the Wall	1999	
"This Christmas"	Destiny's Child	Donny Hathaway; Nadine McKinnor	8 Days of Christmas	2001	
"Through with Love"	Destiny's Child	Beyoncé; Kelly Rowland; Michelle Williams; Sean Garrett; Mario Winans	Destiny Fulfilled	2004	
"Thug Love" †	50 Cent featuring Destiny's Child	Curtis Jackson; Rashad Smith; Josh Schwartz; Brian Kierulf; Nycolia Turman	Power of the Dollar	1999	
"Upside Down"	Destiny's Child	Nile Rodgers; Bernard Edwards	VH1 Divas 2000: A Tribute To Diana Ross	2000	
"What's Going On" †	Destiny's Child, Christina Aguilera, Backstreet Boys, Mary J. Blige, Bono, Jermaine Dupri, Fred Durst, Eve, Perry Farrell, Nelly Furtado, Nona Gaye, Darren Hayes, Ja Rule, Jagged Edge, Alicia Keys, Aaron Lewis, Lil' Kim, Jennifer Lopez, Chris Martin, Pat Monahan, Monica, Nas, Nelly, *NSYNC, P. Diddy, T Boz, Chilli, Britney Spears, Gwen Stefani, Michael Stipe, Usher and Scott Weiland	Marvin Gaye; Al Cleveland; Renaldo Benson	—	2001	
"Where'd You Go"	Destiny's Child	Beyoncé; Kelly Rowland; LaTavia Roberson; LeToya Luckett; Chris Stokes; Platinum Status	The Writing's on the Wall	1999	
"White Christmas"	Destiny's Child	Irving Berlin	8 Days of Christmas	2001	
"Why You Actin'"	Destiny's Child	Beyoncé; Kelly Rowland; Michelle Williams; Marcus Divine; PAJAM; J. Moss	Destiny Fulfilled ‡	2004	
"Winter Paradise"	Destiny's Child	Beyoncé; Rob Fusari; Falonte Moore; George Michael	8 Days of Christmas	2001	
"With Me Part I" †	Destiny's Child featuring Jermaine Dupri	Master P Manuel Seal; Jermaine Dupri	Destiny's Child	1998	
"With Me Part II" †	Destiny's Child featuring Master P	Beyoncé; Kelly Rowland; LaTavia Roberson; LeToya Luckett; Master P Manuel Seal; Jermaine Dupri	Destiny's Child	1998	
"Woman in Me"	Jessica Simpson featuring Destiny's Child	Meja; Anders Bagge	Sweet Kisses	1999	
"You Changed"	Kelly Rowland featuring Beyoncé and Michelle Williams	Kelly Rowland; Courtney Harrell; Harmony Samuels	Talk a Good Game	2013	
"You're the Only One"	Destiny's Child	Taura Stinson; D'wayne Wiggins	Destiny's Child ‡	1998	

== See also ==
- Destiny's Child discography
- Beyoncé Knowles discography
- Kelly Rowland discography
- Michelle Williams discography
- LeToya Luckett discography
