= Changes (Imagination song) =

Single by Imagination

from the album In the Heat of the Night
- Released: 26 November 1982
- Genre: Post-disco, R&B
- Length: 5:46 (12" version); 3:59 (7" version)
- Label: R&B (UK, RBL 213); MCA (U.S., MCA-13962)
- Songwriters: A. Ingram, Leee John, Steve Jolley, Tony Swain
- Producers: Steve Jolley, Tony Swain

Imagination singles chronology
"Burnin' Up" (1982)	"Changes" (1982)	"Looking at Midnight" (1983)

"Changes" is the eighth single by the British soul and post-disco band Imagination, released by R & B Records in 1982 in the United Kingdom and by MCA Records in 1983 in the United States. The song was produced and arranged by Tony Swain and Steve Jolley.

"Changes" appears on the band's 1982 album In the Heat of the Night (which also features the tracks "Music and Lights" and "Just an Illusion", which were successful hits for the band earlier in 1982).

"Changes" peaked at #31 on the UK Singles Chart, becoming the band's seventh Top 40 hit. It also charted on the US Billboard Dance (#66), and Billboard R&B (#46).

The US version of the 12" single contained new remixes by Larry Levan, the "USA Megamix" and an "Instrumental" version. The latter would be included on their remix album Night Dubbing.

== Track listing ==
=== UK 12" single ===
1. "Changes" – 5:46
2. "So Good So Right" – 7:00

=== US 12" single ===
1. "Changes (USA Megamix)" – 7:48
2. "Changes (Instrumental)" – 6:29

== Charts ==
Chart (1982–83)	Peak position
UK Singles Chart	31
U.S. Hot R&B/Hip-Hop Songs	46
U.S. Hot Dance Club Play	66

== Credits ==
- Engineers: Tony Bridge, Brad Davis, Dave Ford, Leee John, Austin Ince, Steve Jolley, Richard Lengyel, Gordon Milne
