= In the Heat of the Night (Imagination album) =

Studio album by Imagination
- Released: 3 September 1982
- Recorded: 1982
- Studios: Red Bus (London); PRT (London); Marcus Music (London); Nova (London)
- Genres: Post-disco; new wave; funk; soul
- Length: 41:58
- Labels: R&B; MCA (US)
- Producer: Jolley & Swain

Imagination chronology
Body Talk (1981)	In the Heat of the Night (1982)	Night Dubbing (1983)

Singles from In the Heat of the Night
- 1. "Just an Illusion" Released: 19 February 1982; 2. "Music and Lights" Released: 11 June 1982; 3. "In the Heat of the Night" Released: 17 September 1982; 4. "Changes" Released: 26 November 1982

Professional ratings
Review scores
Source	Rating
AllMusic	4/5 stars
Robert Christgau	B+
The Encyclopedia of Popular Music	3/5 stars
Record Mirror	3/5 stars
Smash Hits	7/10

In the Heat of the Night is the second album by British soul/dance group Imagination, produced by Steve Jolley and Tony Swain and released in 1982.

== Release and singles ==
In the Heat of the Night was Imagination's most successful album, reaching No. 7 in the United Kingdom. "Just an Illusion" was the group's highest charting single, peaking at No. 2 (kept off the top spot by the Goombay Dance Band's "Seven Tears"), and also making the top 10 in several other countries in Western Europe and Scandinavia. It was covered by Destiny's Child on its self-titled album and Mariah Carey sampled this song as part of her hit "Get Your Number" on her 2005 album The Emancipation of Mimi. "Music and Lights" was another UK top 5 hit, and "In the Heat of the Night" and "Changes" also charted.

== Track listing ==
All tracks composed by Steve Jolley, Tony Swain, Leee John and Ashley Ingram.

1. "In the Heat of the Night" – 5:14
2. "Heart 'N Soul" – 4:45
3. "Music and Lights" – 5:21
4. "All Night Loving" – 4:18
5. "Just an Illusion" – 6:27
6. "All I Want to Know" – 4:48
7. "One More Love" – 5:18
8. "Changes" – 5:47

== Personnel ==
- Tony Swain – Roland SH-1000 synthesizer (track 5, 8)

Technical

- Tony Swain – engineer, producer, arrangement
- Steve Jolley – engineer, producer, arrangement
- Richard Lengyel – engineer
- Gordon Milne – additional engineer
- Dave Ford – additional engineer
- Brad Davis – additional engineer
- Roland Harris – additional engineer
- Austin Ince – additional engineer
- Tony Bridge – cutting engineer
- Dave Rose – cover concept, design, illustration
- Leee John – cover concept
- Brian Longley – cover concept
- Carl Marx – photography
- Howard Saunders – typography

== Charts ==
=== Weekly charts ===
Chart (1982)	Peak position
Austrian Albums (Ö3 Austria)	16
Dutch Albums (Album Top 100)	12
German Albums (Offizielle Top 100)	6
Icelandic Albums (Dagblaðið Vísir)	6
Norwegian Albums (VG-lista)	26
Swedish Albums (Sverigetopplistan)	16
UK Albums (Official Charts)	7
US Top R&B/Hip-Hop Albums (Billboard)	45

=== Year-end charts ===
Chart (1982)	Position
Dutch Albums (Album Top 100)	95
UK Albums (OCC)	50

== Certifications ==
Region	Certification	Certified units/sales
United Kingdom (BPI)	Gold	100,000^{^}
^{^} Shipments figures based on certification alone.
