= Get Your Number =

2005 single by Mariah Carey

Single by Mariah Carey

from the album The Emancipation of Mimi
- A-side: "Shake It Off"
- B-side: "Secret Love"; "Shake It Off" (remix); "We Belong Together" (Atlantic Soul radio edit)
- Released: October 3, 2005
- Recorded: 2004
- Studio: Honeywest (New York City); Southside (Atlanta, Georgia)
- Genre: Pop; R&B
- Length: 3:15
- Label: Island
- Songwriters: Mariah Carey; Jermaine Mauldin; Bryan-Michael Cox; Johntá Austin; James Phillips; Leee John; Ashley Ingram; Steve Jolley; Tony Swain
- Producers: Mariah Carey; Jermaine Dupri

Mariah Carey singles chronology
"Shake It Off" (2005)	"Get Your Number" (2005)	"Don't Forget About Us" (2005)

Music video
- "Get Your Number" on YouTube

"Get Your Number" is a song by American singer Mariah Carey. It was written by Carey, Jermaine Dupri, Bryan-Michael Cox, Johntá Austin, and LRoc, and produced by the former two. It was released on October 3, 2005, by Island Records, as the third international and fourth overall single from Carey's tenth studio album, The Emancipation of Mimi (2005). The song is built around a sample of "Just an Illusion" (1982) by British band Imagination. Due to the inclusion of the sample, several other writers are credited as songwriters. Lyrically, the song features the protagonist persistently asking for the phone number of an individual at a club.

The song received generally mixed reviews from music critics at the time of its release, with many both praising and criticizing the inclusion of the sample, as well as the song's production and lyrical content. "Get Your Number" was released as the third single throughout Europe, where it peaked within the top-ten in Finland, the Netherlands and the United Kingdom, where it was sold as a double A-side along with "Shake It Off". Similarly, the song found release in Australasia in early 2006, as the fifth single from the album, and peaked in the top-twenty in Australia, and at number thirty-four in New Zealand.

The single's music video was directed by Jake Nava, who also directed Carey's video for "Shake It Off". It was filmed in Los Angeles in September 2005, and features Jermaine Dupri as the video's secondary artist, while Michael Ealy plays Carey's love interest at the club. The main setting is a nightclub where Carey slips her phone number to a man, one digit at a time. Carey is shown in a variety of locations wearing, amongst other outfits, a yellow latex dress. Dupri makes a guest appearance as a man receiving the numbers of three girls in the club.

== Composition ==
"Get Your Number"
A 23-second sample of the song; featuring the sampled hook from "Just an Illusion", as well as the computerized musical instrumentation used throughout the song's production.

"Get Your Number" is a mid-tempo song lasting three minutes and fifteen seconds, while drawing influence from pop and R&B music genres. Written by Carey, Jermaine Dupri, Bryan-Michael Cox, Johntá Austin, and LRoc, and produced by the former two, the song samples the hook from British band Imagination's "Just an Illusion" (1982), and derives its production from "‘80s-esque synthesizers" and several computerized musical instruments. Due to its sampling, additional writers such as Ashley Ingram, Leee John, Tony Swain, and Steve Jolley are credited as songwriters. On "Get Your Number", Dupri performs several ad-libs and sings part of the chorus, earning him a place as a featured artist on the track. According to the sheet music published at Musicnotes.com by Alfred Music Publishing, the song is set in common time with a moderate tempo of 126 beats per minute.

The song is composed in the key of F ♯ minor, with Carey's vocal range spanning from the low-note of B_{3} to the high-note of A_{5}. Aside from Dupri's verses, Carey's longtime background singer Trey Lorenz makes a notable impression on the song, and earned credits for providing background vocals. Lyrically, the song is written in a female perspective, where they ask the man for their number at a club. In an interview with MTV News, Carey jokingly addressed the lyrics, claiming Dupri "really wanted it to be coming from the girl, like 'can I get your number' to the guy. But in all honesty that would never be me!" Aside from her signature vocals, Carey adopts a breathy rap for parts of the song, which read "I got a pimp penthouse / With a sick hot tub / We can watch a flat screen / While the bubbles filling up." According to Jozen Cummings from PopMatters, the lyrics and Carey's vocal switch make the song "fun and comedic".

== Critical reception ==
"Get Your Number" received generally mixed reviews from music critics, with many complimenting the song's inclusion of the "Just an Illusion" hook, however, drawing criticism at some of its lyrics, and Dupri's verses. The Guardian editor Caroline Sullivan outed "Stay the Night" and "Get Your Number" as "the first Mariah Carey tunes in years I wouldn't have to be paid to listen to again." Barry Walters from Rolling Stone complimented her vocal performance, writing "Carey's belabored voice finds a pleasurable medium", however criticizing the song's production. Jozen Cummings from PopMatters called Dupri's verses "annoying gangster twang", and described the song's production as "annoying". Stylus Magazine's Todd Burns called the duet "ill-advised" and wrote "Carey does all in her power to save from Jermaine Dupri’s machinations. It barely comes off, despite every attempt from Dupri to sound like Lil Jon and Pharrell along the way." Editor Sal Cinquemani writing for Slant Magazine branded "Get Your Number" a "Summer-anthem-in-the-make", while Michael Paoletta from Billboard described it as "bouncy and silly". Jim Abbott from the Orlando Sentinel described the track as a "sexy, slinky dance number", while a writer from Newsweek claimed it to be a song that "worked".

== Commercial performance ==
"Get Your Number" was released throughout Europe and Asia as the third single from The Emancipation of Mimi in late 2005, and as the fifth single in Australasia in early 2006. In the United Kingdom, it was released as a double A-side along with "Shake It Off", the third single serviced to the United States at the same time. In Australia, "Get Your Number" entered the singles chart at number nineteen during the week dated March 12, 2006. Spending ten weeks fluctuating in the chart, it exited on May 14, 2006. On the Ö3 Austria Top 40, it peaked at number forty-one, although spending eleven weeks within the Austrian charts. In both the Flemish and Wallonian territories in Belgium, "Get Your Number" peaked at number twenty-five and eighteen, while spending fourteen and thirteen weeks in the charts, respectively. The song debuted at number five on Finland's Official List on October 12, 2005. The following week, it moved up two spots to its peak of number three, before exiting the chart two weeks later. On the Dutch Top 40, it made its debut at number ten on November 15, 2005, and spent a total of twelve weeks within the top 40 chart. In both New Zealand and Sweden, "Get Your Number" saw relatively low peaks, placing at numbers thirty-four and forty-nine, for only two and three weeks. In Switzerland, the song entered the Swiss Singles Chart at its peak of number fourteen, while spending twenty-one weeks in the chart until exiting on April 9, 2005. On the UK Singles Chart, the song debuted at number nine during the week of October 15, 2005. Dropping to number ten the following week, the song lasted a total of eight weeks in the singles chart before making its descent.

== Music video ==
The single's music video was directed by Jake Nava, who also directed Carey's video for "Shake It Off". It was filmed in Los Angeles on September 1, 2, 12 and 13, 2005 and features Jermaine Dupri as the video's secondary artist, while Michael Ealy, plays Carey's love interest at the club. The original shoot was scheduled to finish on September 2, but shooting for several of Carey's scenes on the second day was delayed for several days due to her being ill.

The main setting is a nightclub where Carey slips her phone number to a man, one digit at a time. Carey is shown in a variety of locations wearing, amongst other outfits, a yellow latex dress. Dupri makes a guest appearance as a man receiving the numbers of three girls in the club. The video begins with shots of Carey as the star of a club, wearing a yellow latex mini and gold necklace. As the music plays, Carey is seen on a variety of large props, the first of which is a large red phone. As Dupri scouts the club for females, Carey in a different ensemble passes the number '5' to Ealy on a card, while making eye contact with him.

As other scenes of Carey in the latex mini and by the large red hone prop are interspersed, the club scene alters to a poker table, where Ealy reveals three of his card, '556', completing four of the seven digits of Carey phone number. The next scene finds Carey sitting on a large pink sofa in an empty room in the club, sporting only a white man's suit jacket and stilettos. As the song reaches the bridge, Carey is shown back in the club's main room dancing, as she leaves a number '4' on a nearby table for the man to find. As Carey once again is shown in the yellow latex dress, she walks down a small aisle, placing another card with the number '4' into Ealy's jacket pocket, before storming through the club by several followers. As the video ends, the number '555-6464' are shown lying on a small table, while Carey sits on the large pink sofa, and Ealy is seen on the other side gazing at her. The video concludes with Ealy slowly approaching Carey on the large sofa, as she winks and smiles to the camera.

== Formats and track listings ==
Get Your Number / Shake It Off UK 2-track CD single

1. "Get Your Number" (feat. Jermaine Dupri) – 3:18
2. "Shake It Off" – 3:54

Get Your Number / Shake It Off European CD maxi-single; European 12-inch vinyl

1. "Get Your Number" (feat. Jermaine Dupri) – 3:18
2. "Shake It Off" – 3:54
3. "Secret Love" – 3:09

European 2-track CD single

1. "Get Your Number" (feat. Jermaine Dupri) – 3:18
2. "Shake It Off" (Remix feat. Jay-Z & Young Jeezy) – 5:03

DACH 2-track CD single

1. "Get Your Number" (feat. Jermaine Dupri) – 3:15
2. "We Belong Together" (Atlantic Soul Radio Edit) – 4:27

Australasian, European and Thai CD maxi-single

1. "Get Your Number" (feat. Jermaine Dupri) – 3:16
2. "We Belong Together" (Atlantic Soul Radio Edit) – 4:23
3. "Secret Love" – 3:10
4. "Get Your Number" (Video)

== Credits and personnel ==
Credits are adapted from The Emancipation of Mimi liner notes.

- Mariah Carey – songwriting, producer, vocals
- Jermaine Dupri – songwriting, producer, vocals
- Johntá Austin – songwriting
- Ashley Ingram – songwriting
- LRoc – songwriting
- Steve Jolley – songwriting
- Tony Swain – songwriting
- Phil Tan – audio mixing
- Herb Power – mastering
- Brian Frye – engineer
- John Horesco – engineer
- Trey Lorenz – background vocals

== Charts ==
=== Weekly charts ===
Weekly chart performance for "Get Your Number"
Chart (2005–2006)	Peak position
Australia (ARIA)	19
Australian Urban (ARIA)	6
Austria (Ö3 Austria Top 40)	41
Belgium (Ultratop 50 Flanders)	25
Belgium (Ultratop 50 Wallonia)	18
European Hot 100 Singles (Billboard)	31
Finland (Suomen virallinen lista)	3
Germany (GfK)	27
Greece (IFPI)	21
Hungary (Rádiós Top 40)	34
Hungary (Dance Top 40)	22
Ireland (IRMA) with "Shake It Off"	15
Italy (FIMI)	22
Netherlands (Dutch Top 40)	7
Netherlands (Single Top 100)	10
New Zealand (Recorded Music NZ)	34
Romania (Romanian Top 100)	69
Scottish Singles Sales (Official Charts) with "Shake It Off"	23
Sweden (Sverigetopplistan)	49
Switzerland (Schweizer Hitparade)	14
UK Singles (Official Charts) with "Shake It Off"	9
UK Singles Downloads (Official Charts)	18
UK Hip Hop/R&B (Official Charts) with "Shake It Off"	2
UK Urban Club (Music Week)	4

=== Year-end charts ===
2005 year-end chart performance for "Get Your Number"
Chart (2005)	Position
Netherlands (Dutch Top 40)	102
Netherlands (Single Top 100)	77
UK Singles (OCC) with "Shake It Off"	117

2006 year-end chart performance for "Get Your Number"
Chart (2006)	Position
Australian Urban (ARIA)	39

== Release history ==
Release dates and formats for "Get Your Number"
Region	Date	Format(s)	Label(s)	Ref.
United Kingdom	October 3, 2005	CD (with "Shake It Off")	Island	
Italy	October 31, 2005	—	Def Jam	
Austria	November 4, 2005	Maxi CD	Island	
Germany	November 4, 2005	Maxi CD	Island	
Germany	November 4, 2005	CD	Island	
Australia	February 27, 2006	CD	Island	
