= Scandalous (album) =

Studio album by Imagination
- Released: 4 November 1983
- Recorded: Summer 1983
- Studio: Red Bus (London)
- Genres: Post-disco; new wave; funk; soul; R&B
- Length: 43:43
- Labels: R&B; Elektra (US and Canada)
- Producer: Jolley & Swain

Imagination chronology
Night Dubbing (1983)	Scandalous (1983)	Trilogy (1986)

Singles from Scandalous
- 1. "Looking at Midnight" Released: 27 May 1983; 2. "New Dimension" Released: 28 October 1983; 3. "This Means War (Shoo Be Doo Da Dabba Doobee)" Released: January 1984; 4. "State of Love" Released: May 1984

Professional ratings
Review scores
Source	Rating
AllMusic	1.5/5 stars
Robert Christgau	C+
The Encyclopedia of Popular Music	2/5 stars
Number One	2/5 stars
Record Mirror	3/5 stars

Scandalous is the third album by English soul/dance trio Imagination, produced by Steve Jolley and Tony Swain and released in November 1983. In the US and Canada, the album was issued under title New Dimension in February 1984.

Scandalous failed to repeat the success of Imagination's previous albums, stalling at No. 25 in the United Kingdom and not producing a top 20 single. It marked the start of a decline in the group's commercial fortunes; subsequent albums were even less successful.

== Track listing ==
All tracks are written by Steve Jolley, Tony Swain, Leee John and Ashley Ingram.

Side one
No.	Title	Length
1.	"New Dimension"	7:18
2.	"State of Love"	4:50
3.	"Point of No Return"	5:05
4.	"When I See the Fire"	4:40

Side two
No.	Title	Length
5.	"Shoo Be Doo Da Dabba Doobee"	6:24
6.	"Wrong in Love"	4:40
7.	"Looking at Midnight"	5:50
8.	"The Need to Be Free"	4:56
Total length:		43:43

=== US and Canada release ===
Side one
No.	Title	Length
1.	"New Dimension" (Jonathan Fearing Remix)	6:35
2.	"State of Love" (Jonathan Fearing Remix)	6:00
3.	"Point of No Return"	5:10
4.	"When I See the Fire"	4:44

Side two
No.	Title	Length
5.	"This Means War (Shoo Be Doo Da Dabba Doobee)"	6:27
6.	"Wrong in Love"	4:48
7.	"Looking at Midnight"	5:52
8.	"The Need to Be Free"	4:58
Total length:		44:34

== Personnel ==
Musicians

- Leee John – lead vocals, keyboards, percussion
- Ashley Ingram – bass guitar, synthesiser, keyboards, vocals
- Errol Kennedy – drums, percussion
- Tony Swain – keyboards
- Steve Jolley – percussion

Technical

- Tony Swain – producer, engineer, mixing
- Steve Jolley – producer, engineer, mixing
- Richard Lengyel – engineer, mixing
- Nigel Askew – photography
- Chess Creative Services – artwork
- Recorded and mixed at Red Bus Studios in Summer 1983
- On the US and Canada release, tracks 1 and 2 were remixed by Jonathan Fearing with engineer Carla Bandini at Sigma Sound Studios in 1984

== Charts ==
Chart (1983)	Peak position
Dutch Albums (Album Top 100)	16
German Albums (Offizielle Top 100)	49
UK Albums (Official Charts)	25

Chart (1984)	Peak position
US Bubbling Under the Top LPs (Billboard)	205
US Top R&B/Hip-Hop Albums (Billboard)	44
