= Body Talk (Imagination song) =

Single by Imagination

from the album Body Talk
- Released: 1 May 1981
- Studio: Red Bus (London, England)
- Length: 3:35; 6:00
- Label: R&B
- Songwriters: Steve Jolley; Tony Swain; Leee John; Ashley Ingram
- Producer: Jolley & Swain

Imagination singles chronology
| "Body Talk" (1981) | "In and Out of Love" (1981) |

"Body Talk" is the debut single by English trio Imagination, taken from their debut studio album, Body Talk (1981). It is their second biggest single on the UK Singles Chart, reaching a peak of number four, just behind their 1982 hits "Just an Illusion" (#2), but just ahead of "Music and Lights" (#5).

"Body Talk" was written by Steve Jolley and Tony Swain from the record production team Jolley & Swain, along with Leee John and Ashley Ingram from Imagination. It was arranged and produced by Jolley & Swain.

== Track listing and formats ==
=== 7-inch vinyl single ===
1. A – "Body Talk" – 3:35
2. B – "Body Talk" (Instrumental) – 5:15

=== 12-inch vinyl single ===
1. A – "Body Talk" – 6:20
2. B – "Body Talk" (Instrumental) – 5:15

== Charts ==
Chart performance for "Body Talk"
| Chart (1981–1982) | Peak position |
|---|---|
| Belgium (Ultratop 50 Flanders) | 25 |
| France (IFOP) | 10 |
| Ireland (IRMA) | 9 |
| Netherlands (Dutch Top 40) | 11 |
| Netherlands (Single Top 100) | 16 |
| New Zealand (Recorded Music NZ) | 49 |
| UK Singles (Official Charts) | 4 |
