= List of number-one singles of 1982 (France) =

This is a list of the French Singles & Airplay Chart Reviews number-ones of 1982.

== Summary ==
=== Singles Chart ===
| Week | Date | Artist | Single |
|---|---|---|---|
| 1 | 1 January | Ennio Morricone | "Chi mai" |
| 2 | 8 January | Ennio Morricone | "Chi mai" |
| 3 | 15 January | Nana Mouskouri | "Je Chante Avec Toi, Liberté" |
| 4 | 22 January | Chagrin d'amour | "Chacun Fait Ce Qu'il Lui Plait" |
| 5 | 29 January | Nikka Costa | "(Out Here) On My Own" |
| 6 | 5 February | Nikka Costa | "(Out Here) On My Own" |
| 7 | 12 February | Nikka Costa | "(Out Here) On My Own" |
| 8 | 19 February | Nikka Costa | "(Out Here) On My Own" |
| 9 | 26 February | Nikka Costa | "(Out Here) On My Own" |
| 10 | 5 March | Chagrin d'amour | "Chacun fait ce qu'il lui plait" |
| 11 | 12 March | Kim Wilde | "Cambodia" |
| 12 | 19 March | Kim Wilde | "Cambodia" |
| 13 | 26 March | Kim Wilde | "Cambodia" |
| 14 | 2 April | Kim Wilde | "Cambodia" |
| 15 | 9 April | Kim Wilde | "Cambodia" |
| 16 | 16 April | Kim Wilde | "Cambodia" |
| 17 | 23 April | Kim Wilde | "Cambodia" |
| 18 | 30 April | Kim Wilde | "Cambodia" |
| 19 | 7 May | Kim Wilde | "Cambodia" |
| 20 | 14 May | Kim Wilde | "Cambodia" |
| 21 | 21 May | Kim Wilde | "Cambodia" |
| 22 | 28 May | Kim Wilde | "Cambodia" |
| 23 | 4 June | Kim Wilde | "Cambodia" |
| 24 | 11 June | Thierry Pastor | "Le coup de folie" |
| 25 | 18 June | Thierry Pastor | "Le coup de folie" |
| 26 | 25 June | Thierry Pastor | "Le coup de folie" |
| 27 | 2 July | Pop Concerto Orchestra | "Eden is a Magic World" |
| 28 | 9 July | Pop Concerto Orchestra | "Eden is a Magic World" |
| 29 | 16 July | Pop Concerto Orchestra | "Eden is a Magic World" |
| 30 | 23 July | Pop Concerto Orchestra | "Eden is a Magic World" |
| 31 | 30 July | Pop Concerto Orchestra | "Eden is a Magic World" |
| 32 | 6 August | Pop Concerto Orchestra | "Eden is a Magic World" |
| 33 | 13 August | Pop Concerto Orchestra | "Eden is a Magic World" |
| 34 | 20 August | Pop Concerto Orchestra | "Eden is a Magic World" |
| 35 | 27 August | Kim Wilde | "Cambodia" |
| 36 | 3 September | Imagination | "Music and Lights" |
| 37 | 10 September | Imagination | "Music and Lights" |
| 38 | 17 September | Imagination | "Music and Lights" |
| 39 | 24 September | Imagination | "Music and Lights" |
| 40 | 1 October | Philippe Lavil | "Il tape sur des bambous" |
| 41 | 8 October | Philippe Lavil | "Il tape sur des bambous" |
| 42 | 15 October | Philippe Lavil | "Il tape sur des bambous" |
| 43 | 22 October | Philippe Lavil | "Il tape sur des bambous" |
| 44 | 29 October | Supertramp | "It's Raining Again" |
| 45 | 5 November | Philippe Lavil | "Il tape sur des bambous" |
| 46 | 12 November | Philippe Lavil | "Il tape sur des bambous" |
| 47 | 19 November | Philippe Lavil | "Il tape sur des bambous" |
| 48 | 26 November | Philippe Lavil | "Il tape sur des bambous" |
| 49 | 3 December | Dorothée | "Hou! La menteuse" |
| 50 | 10 December | Dorothée | "Hou! La menteuse" |
| 51 | 17 December | Dorothée | "Hou! La menteuse" |
| 52 | 24 December | Dorothée | "Hou! La menteuse" |
| 53 | 31 December | Dorothée | "Hou! La menteuse" |

== See also ==
- 1982 in music
- List of number-one hits (France)
