= Burnin' Up (Imagination song) =

Promotional single by Imagination

from the album Body Talk
- Released: 1982
- Recorded: 1981
- Genre: Garage; boogie; jazz-funk
- Length: 4:50 (12″ version)
- Label: MCA
- Songwriter(s): Steve Jolley; Tony Swain; Ashley Ingram; Leee John

Imagination singles chronology
"In the Heat of the Night" (1982)	"Burnin' Up" (1982)	"Changes" (1982)

"Burnin' Up" is a 1982 song recorded by British post-disco/soul trio Imagination, published by R&B Records in UK and MCA Records in the United States. "Burnin' Up" was composed by Leee John, Ashley Ingram and the Jolley & Swain duo. The song appears on their debut album titled Body Talk.

"Burnin' Up" was a club hit in the United States while it failed to chart on the UK Singles Chart.

== Track listing ==
- US 12″ promotional single
1. "Burnin' Up" – 4:50
2. "So Good, So Right" – 7:00

== Charts ==
Chart (1982)	Peak position
US Dance Club Songs (Billboard)	6
US Hot R&B/Hip-Hop Songs (Billboard)	68
