= In the Heat of the Night (Imagination song) =

Single by Imagination

from the album In the Heat of the Night
- Released: 17 September 1982
- Genre: Boogie, soul
- Length: 5:18 (12" version)
- Label: R & B Records (UK RBL 211)
- Songwriter(s): Steve Jolley, Tony Swain, Ashley Ingram, Leee John

Imagination singles chronology
"Music and Lights" (1982)	"In the Heat of the Night" (1982)	"Burnin' Up" (1982)

"In the Heat of the Night" is the title of a boogie song by British trio Imagination. The single was released by R&B Records in 1982. The song has also appeared on their album, In the Heat of the Night. The single reached number 22 on the British pop chart in 1982.

== Track listing ==
UK 12" single

1. "In the Heat of the Night" – 5:18
2. "In the Heat of the Night" (Instrumental) – 3:30

== Production ==
In lieu of a normal bass line through conventional methods, this track showcases the Roland TB-303 bass synthesizer instead. This song serves as one of the few examples of the TB-303 being used for its intended purpose before being pushed into alternate timbres with the advent of acid house music years later.

== Chart positions ==
Chart (1982)	Peak position)
UK Singles Chart	22
