= Destiny's Child (album) =

Studio album by Destiny's Child
- Released: February 17, 1998
- Recorded: 1996–1997
- Studios: Castle Oak (Calabasas); Chung King (New York); Digital Services (Houston); The Hit Factory (New York); House of Music (Oakland); KrossWire (Atlanta); LaCoCo (Atlanta); Live Oak (Berkeley); Manhattan Ave. (Topanga); Pajama (Oakland); PatchWerk (Atlanta)
- Genres: Neo soul; R&B
- Length: 56:09
- Label: Columbia
- Producers: Tim & Bob; Sylvia Bennett-Smith; Jerry Duplessis; Jermaine Dupri; Rob Fusari; Che Greene; Vincent Herbert; Wyclef Jean; KLC; Jay Lincoln; Mark Morales; Odell; Cory Rooney; Terry T; Craig Bazile; Carl Washington; D'Wayne Wiggins

Destiny's Child chronology
Destiny's Child (1998)	The Writing's on the Wall (1999)

Singles from Destiny's Child
- 1. "No, No, No" Released: October 27, 1997; 2. "With Me" Released: April 20, 1998

Destiny's Child is the debut studio album by American girl group Destiny's Child. It was released on February 17, 1998, by Columbia Records. Predominantly an R&B and neo soul album, it was recorded over a two-year period, predominantly with D'Wayne Wiggins. Wiggins and the group's manager Mathew Knowles enlisted 16 producers for the album, including Jermaine Dupri, Rob Fusari, Vincent Herbert, and Wyclef Jean. Consequently, the record draws on a variety of genres, including 1960s and 1970s soul, hip-hop, and pop. Lyrically, it explores themes of love, romantic equity, self-confidence, and autonomy.

On release, Destiny's Child received mixed to positive reviews from music critics, who praised the group's vocal harmony but dismissed the record's musical style as indistinguishable and overly mature for the group's then-teenaged members. At the 1998 Soul Train Lady of Soul Awards, it won Best R&B/Soul Album of the Year – Group, Band or Duo. Commercially a sleeper hit, the album initially reached number 67 on the US Billboard 200, but went on to receive a platinum certification from the Recording Industry Association of America (RIAA) for shipping one million units in the US. It produced two singles—"No, No, No" and "With Me"—with the former reaching number three on the US Billboard Hot 100.

== Background and development ==
In 1990, Beyoncé and LaTavia Roberson, both aged nine, met at an audition for the Houston-based girl group Girl's Tyme, of which they soon became members. Kelly Rowland joined the group the following year, and they unsuccessfully auditioned for Star Search in 1992. In 1993, Beyoncé's father Mathew Knowles became the group's manager, alongside its founder Andretta Tillman. Knowles restructured the group from a sextet to a quartet, and recruited LeToya Luckett. After numerous name changes, the group was renamed Destiny. Eliciting interest from both Elektra Records and Columbia Records, the group signed a record deal with the former in 1995. However, the label terminated their contract the same year, without the group having recorded a debut album. Inspired by a passage in the Book of Isaiah, the group renamed themselves Destiny's Child. They soon began touring as an opening act for groups Immature, Dru Hill, Das EFX, and SWV. After a second audition for Columbia's Teresa LaBarbera Whites in 1996, Whites signed them to the label. Immediately afterwards, Destiny's Child commenced work on their debut album, having been signed to D'Wayne Wiggins' production company Grass Roots Entertainment.

== Recording and production ==
Destiny's Child began recording material for their first album in early 1996. D'Wayne Wiggins and Mathew Knowles enlisted 16 producers for Destiny's Child, which would be recorded until late 1997. LaTavia Roberson reflected: "Mathew always just made us listen to the tracks, emphasizing it shouldn't matter if the producer has a name. What was most important is that we felt the music." A key contributor to Destiny's Child, Wiggins produced "Second Nature", and co-wrote and produced "Bridges", "Killing Time", and "Birthday", with the tracks recorded at his recording studio House of Music in Oakland. Tim & Bob wrote and produced "Tell Me", which was recorded at L.A. Reid's Studio LaCoCo in Atlanta, while Carl Washington produced "Show Me the Way". In May 1997, Andretta Tillman died of lupus, aged 39. Destiny's Child and its closing track "My Time Has Come" were consequently dedicated to her. In July, Destiny's Child made their debut as "Killing Time" was included on the soundtrack for the 1997 film Men in Black; the soundtrack peaked atop the US Billboard 200. Mark Morales and Cory Rooney produced Destiny's Child's cover of the Lionel Richie-written Commodores' 1979 song "Sail On"; the cover was recorded at The Hit Factory in New York City. In New York, Destiny's Child also recorded "No, No, No", written and produced by Rob Fusari and Vincent Herbert, at the Chung King Studios. With the album, then titled Bridges, slated for an October 1997 release, "No, No, No" was selected as its lead single. A promotional cassette for Bridges was issued, including all aforementioned tracks alongside "You're the Only One", "Never Had a Love", and "Show Me", which would ultimately fail to make the final track listing of the retitled Destiny's Child. (Note: "You're the Only One" would eventually appear as the B-side on select CD single pressings of "No, No, No", and as a bonus track on the 2001 reissue of Destiny's Child.)

However, Teresa LaBarbera Whites was adamant that a track more distinguishable than "No, No, No" be the lead single. Destiny's Child fortuitously met Wyclef Jean at Sony Music's headquarters in New York, and performed "No, No, No" a cappella for him. Impressed, he asked the group to contribute to the remix of his 1997 single "We Trying to Stay Alive". He subsequently produced "No, No, No Part 2" by accelerating the original version around a sample of Barry White's "Strange Games & Things". After Beyoncé jokingly sang the song's lyrics in a fast, staccato manner, Wyclef Jean encouraged her to incorporate the style into the recording; the rap-sung staccato would be incorporated into Destiny's Child's subsequent albums and become their signature singing style. Rowland reflected on the sessions by saying: "There was never a dull moment in the studio working with Wyclef". "No, No, No Part 2" was recorded at the Digital Services Recording Studios in Houston, where a substantial portion of Destiny's Child was recorded. Wyclef Jean also produced "Illusion", on which he made a guest appearance alongside his fellow Fugees member Pras; the track is a cover of Imagination's 1982 song "Just an Illusion". Jermaine Dupri and Manuel Seal wrote and produced "With Me Part I". They co-wrote the song's "Part II" with Destiny's Child; alongside "Birthday", it was the album's sole track written by the group. Produced by the Medicine Men's KLC, Odell, and Craig B, "With Me Part II" features a rap performed by Master P; "Freak Hoes", recorded by Master P's group TRU, was sampled on both parts of "With Me". Both parts of "With Me" were recorded at the KrossWire Studios in Atlanta. Other recording locations for Destiny's Child included Castle Oak Studios in Calabasas, Live Oak Studios in Berkeley, Manhattan Ave. Studios in Topanga, Pajama Recording Studios in Oakland, and PatchWerk Recording Studios in Atlanta.

== Music and lyrics ==
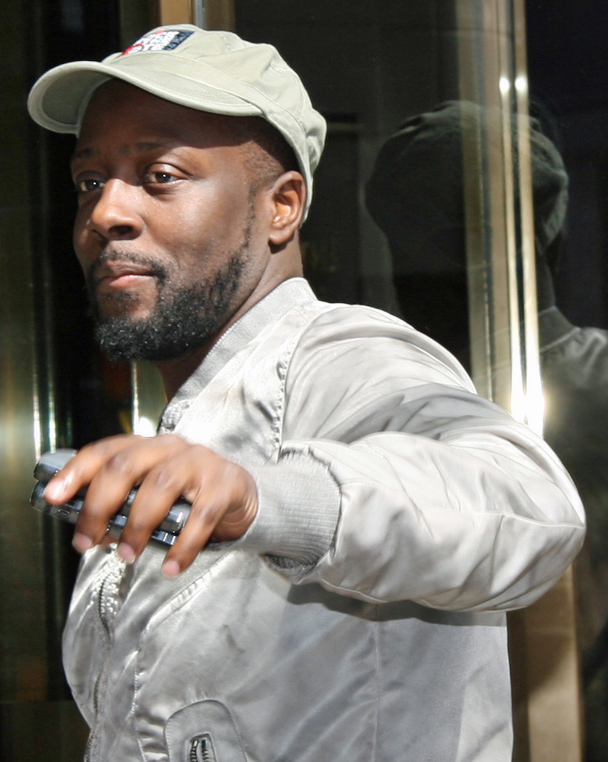
Wyclef Jean appears on "No, No, No Part 2" and "Illusion", both of which he produced.

Destiny's Child is predominantly classified as an R&B and neo soul record, (Note: attributed to multiple sources) drawing influences from quiet storm, 1960s and 1970s soul, hip-hop, pop, and gospel. Its musical style is largely defined by the utilization of live instruments, with tracks such as "Second Nature" and "Bridges" heavily driven by Rhodes piano, bass, trumpets, and saxophone. The album's lyrics focus on themes of love, romantic equity, self-confidence, and autonomy. Destiny's Child opens with "Second Nature", a neo soul track starting with a blues-influenced electric guitar solo, which transitions into a sample of the Isley Brothers' 1975 song "Make Me Say It Again, Girl". While "No, No, No Part 1" is a new jack swing-influenced down-tempo R&B track, its counterpart is an up-tempo, hip-hop-influenced contemporary R&B track. The song's lyrical content centers on a man forsaking his partner in favor of his friends. "With Me" is lyrically an answer song to Usher's 1997 song "You Make Me Wanna..." and depicts a mistress taunting her lover's partner: "'Cause I know what you didn't do to make him stay / See, a bad-performing, unfulfilling woman drives a man away".

"Tell Me" is a "soporific, sophisticated late-night" ballad which follows a woman pleading with her long-term partner to end their failing relationship. Writing for Tidal, Kristin Corry compared Beyoncé's mezzo-soprano vocal performance on the track to Diana Ross. Motivationally themed "Bridges" samples the hook from Al Green's 1972 song "Simply Beautiful". "Show Me the Way" is a jazz-funk track heavily influenced by early-1980s R&B, and defined by "sensual" beats, synthesized strings, and "cooing" melodies. Jazz and funk influences are also prevalent on the hip-hop track "Illusion". "Killing Time" is a ballad driven by metronomic percussion, acoustic guitar, and Benjamin Wright's understated string arrangement. Its lyrics focus on a woman spending a day waiting for her partner to return home. Slow jam "Birthday" and country-influenced soul track "Sail On" follow, before Destiny's Child concludes with "My Time Has Come", an emotional gospel-styled dedication to Andretta Tillman.

== Marketing and sales ==
In 1997, Destiny's Child performed as an opening act on SWV and the O'Jays' respective concert tours, in order to promote Destiny's Child. "No, No, No" was subsequently released as their debut single, and the lead single from Destiny's Child, on October 27. The song's two versions were strategically given a dual release, to ensure chart success. "No, No, No" eventually reached its peak at number three on the US Billboard Hot 100, and became the ninth best-selling single of 1998 in the US. Destiny's Child was released on February 17, 1998. It was initially promoted with an appearance at the 1998 Soul Train Music Awards on February 27, and a performance on Live with Regis and Kathie Lee on April 20; the latter was their debut televised performance. The album debuted at number 69 on the US Billboard 200 chart dated March 7, 1998, peaking at number 67 four weeks later. Meanwhile, it debuted and peaked at number 14 on the US Top R&B/Hip-Hop Albums. In the UK, where the album debuted and peaked at number 45 on the UK Albums Chart, Destiny's Child performed "No, No, No" on the Top of the Pops episode dated March 27, 1998, and "With Me" on the episode dated July 10. "With Me" was released as the album's second single on April 20, but failed to enter the Billboard Hot 100 due to its airplay-only release. (Note: Prior to December 5, 1998, singles were ineligible to enter the Billboard Hot 100 unless they were released on a commercially available format.) Unlike "No, No, No", only part one of "With Me" was accompanied by a music video, to which Beyoncé later attributed the single's underperformance, as the song's part two was deemed more marketable due to Master P's appearance.

The group embarked on a national summer 1998 tour with Boyz II Men, K-Ci & JoJo, and Uncle Sam, which commenced in Nashville on April 29. Destiny's Child subsequently joined Jon B. and Jagged Edge on their fall 1998 tour, which commenced in Omaha on September 16. "Illusion" was scheduled for release as the third single from Destiny's Child, with Columbia Records commissioning a Maurice Joshua-produced dance remix with re-recorded vocals, in an attempt to market the two versions simultaneously, as was done with the album's first two singles. However, the single was canceled as the group's management was eager for the recording of a second studio effort to begin. LaTavia Roberson retrospectively stated: "It's not that we didn't love 'Illusion', but we were minors and it's the executives who make the decisions. The label wanted us to move on and create more age-appropriate music." The club mix of "Illusion" was instead released as the B-side to Destiny's Child's single "Get on the Bus", from the soundtrack to the 1998 film Why Do Fools Fall in Love. In the aftermath of the success of Destiny's Child's second album The Writing's on the Wall, Destiny's Child became a sleeper hit, proceeding to be certified platinum by the Recording Industry Association of America (RIAA) in July 2000, for shipments of one million units in the US. In August 2001, the album was reissued outside North America, including the bonus tracks "You're the Only One", a remix of "No, No, No", and Joshua's remix of "Illusion"—retitled "DubiLLusions".

== Critical reception ==
Professional ratings
Review scores
Source	Rating
AllMusic	4/5 stars
The Encyclopedia of Popular Music	3/5 stars
The Great Rock Discography	6/10 stars
Music Week	3/5 stars
Q	3/5 stars
The Rolling Stone Album Guide	3/5 stars
Tom Hull	B+

Destiny's Child received mixed to positive reviews from music critics. John Bush of AllMusic and a critic from Q directed predominant praise towards the group's vocal harmony. However, Bush also wrote that, while the album differed from other R&B girl groups' debut efforts, its sound was largely indistinguishable. Similarly, Jess Harvell of Pitchfork remarked that it "could be the work of any freshly scrubbed African-American teenagers from the mid-90s". An editor of Vibe called it "more earnest than Allure, but less inspiring than 702", adding that the "urban-chic" record possessed the ability to "entice listeners with sultry vocals and apple-pie innocence". British magazine Music Week described the album as a "mixture of soulful grooves and kickin' dancefloor tracks." At the 1998 Soul Train Lady of Soul Awards, Destiny's Child won three awards, including Best R&B/Soul Album of the Year – Group, Band or Duo for Destiny's Child.

In retrospective commentaries regarding Destiny's Child, Q and critic Piero Scaruffi both credited the record's mainstream quality with helping to establish Destiny's Child as a viable act. Conversely, Paul Flynn of The Guardian reflected on the album being a "relative misfire", negatively comparing its musical style to TLC, Jill Scott, and Angie Stone. In The Rolling Stone New Album Guide (2004), Rob Sheffield declared it inferior to Destiny's Child's subsequent albums The Writing's on the Wall (1999) and Survivor (2001). The Recording Academy's Sope Soetan opined that Destiny's Child had aged well by its 25th anniversary, adding that tracks such as "Show Me the Way", "Birthday", and "You're the Only One" merited contemporary reappraisal. Meanwhile, Jon O'Brien of Billboard described it as infused with "tastefully arranged, slickly produced and well-performed but entirely unremarkable R&B slow jam[s]", further criticizing its lyrical themes.

== Legacy ==
In October 1998, Destiny's Child began recording their second album The Writing's on the Wall. Partly dissatisfied with Destiny's Child, the group asserted more creative control over The Writing's on the Wall. The Writing's on the Wall was released in July 1999, preceded by their first US Billboard Hot 100 number-one hit "Bills, Bills, Bills". Its musical style was a distinct departure from the neo soul quality of Destiny's Child, exploring a futuristic pop-R&B sound constructed through unconventional production methods. The album was a commercial success, reaching number five on the US Billboard 200, and is widely regarded as the group's breakthrough record. In 2006, Beyoncé reflected on Destiny's Child being largely overshadowed by its successor, which she attributed to the former's neo soul style, perceived as too mature for then-teenaged group members. Meanwhile, Mathew Knowles commented: "We wanted to brand these girls as fresh hot teenagers. Though the album had some phenomenal songs, it didn't fit into the direction we were heading into".

Upon the 20th anniversary of its release, Destiny's Child became subject to critical reappraisal. Canadian Broadcasting Corporation's Amanda Parris reflected on the album's singles highlighting Destiny's Child as a "worthy (if not yet distinct) contender in the competitive landscape of R&B girl groups" of the late 1990s. Kristin Corry of Tidal regarded the album as a "solid" introduction to the group's "twin strengths of sweeping ballads and tight harmonies". Jon O'Brien of Billboard remarked that, had the rest of the record been in the vein of "No, No, No Part 2", the group's "world domination would no doubt have come a little sooner". Writing for the Recording Academy, Sope Soetan stated that Destiny's Child "heralded the beginning of an R&B supergroup" and remained an "artifact of the elements central to Destiny's Child's musical persona", concluding: "Achieving a level of international and cross-cultural appeal as Black women that eluded their competitors and some of their forebears, Destiny's Child is demonstrative of the axiom that it's not about how you start, but how you finish." In 2022, Beyoncé and the Isley Brothers re-recorded "Make Me Say It Again, Girl", which had been sampled on "Second Nature". The re-recording peaked atop the US Adult R&B Songs.

== Track listing ==
Destiny's Child
No.	Title	Writer(s)	Producer(s)	Length
1.	"Second Nature"	Marvin Isley; Ronald Isley; Rudolph Isley; Ernie Isley; O'Kelly Isley; Chris Jasper; Terry T; Kymberli Armstrong	Dwayne Wiggins; Terry T^{[a]}; Jay Lincoln^{[a]}	5:09
2.	"No, No, No Part 2" (featuring Wyclef Jean)	Mary Brown; Rob Fusari; Vincent Herbert; Calvin Gaines; Barry White	Wyclef; Jerry Duplessis^{[a]}; Che Greene^{[a]}	3:27
3.	"With Me Part I" (featuring Jermaine Dupri)	Master P; Jermaine Dupri; Manuel Seal	Dupri; Seal^{[a]}	3:26
4.	"Tell Me"	Bob Robinson; Tim Kelley	Robinson; Kelley	4:48
5.	"Bridges"	Michelle Hailey; Wiggins; Al Green	Wiggins	4:02
6.	"No, No, No Part 1"	Brown; Herbert; Fusari; Gaines	Herbert; Fusari	4:07
7.	"With Me Part II" (featuring Master P)	Beyoncé Knowles; Kelly Rowland; LaTavia Roberson; LeToya Luckett; Dupri; Master P; Seal	Craig Bazile; KLC; Odell	4:14
8.	"Show Me the Way"	Darcy Aldridge; Carl Breeding; Jeffrey Bowden	Carl Washington	4:19
9.	"Killing Time"	Wiggins; Taura Stinson	Wiggins	5:09
10.	"Illusion" (featuring Wyclef Jean and Pras)	Isaac Hayes; Tony Swain; Steve Jolley; Ashley Ingram; Leslie John	Jean; Pras^{[a]}; Duplessis^{[a]}	3:52
11.	"Birthday"	Knowles; Rowland; Roberson; Wiggins	Wiggins	5:15
12.	"Sail On"	Lionel Richie	Mark Morales; Cory Rooney	4:04
13.	"My Time Has Come" (Dedicated to Andretta Tillman)	Reed Vertelney; Sylvia Bennett-Smith	Bennett-Smith	4:25
Total length:				56:09

International edition
No.	Title	Writer(s)	Producer(s)	Length
14.	"Know That"	Rachel Oden; Andre Robinson	Father Shaheed	4:24
Total length:				60:33

Japanese edition
No.	Title	Writer(s)	Length
15.	"Amazing Grace"	John Newton	2:39
Total length:			65:15

Expanded edition
No.	Title	Writer(s)	Producer(s)	Length
15.	"You're the Only One"	Wiggins; Stinson	Mark Wilson; Herbert; Gaines; Fusari^{[a]}	3:23
16.	"No, No, No" (Camdino Soul Extended Remix)	Brown; Herbert; Fusari; Gaines	Wyclef; Katt^{[b]}; Jazzie^{[b]}	6:34
17.	"DubiLLusions"	Hayes; Swain; Jolley; Ingram; John	Maurice Joshua	7:33
Total length:				78:03

Notes

- ^{^a} signifies a co-producer
- ^{^b} signifies an additional producer
- Songwriting credits for "Illusion" are excluded from the album's liner notes due to "copyright control".
- North American enhanced edition includes interviews with group members, documentary footage, and the music video for "No, No, No Part 2".

Sample credits

- "Second Nature" contains replayed elements from "Make Me Say It Again, Girl (Part 1 & 2)", performed by the Isley Brothers, written by Marvin Isley, Ronald Isley, Rudolph Isley, Ernie Isley and O'Kelly Isley.
- "No, No, No Part 2" contains elements from "Strange Games & Things", performed and written by Barry White.
- "With Me Parts I & II" contain a sample of "Freak Hoes", performed by TRU, written by Master P.
- "Bridges" contains replayed elements from "Simply Beautiful", performed and written by Al Green.
- "Know That" contains an interpolation of "Tom's Diner", performed and written by Suzanne Vega.

== Personnel ==
Credits are adapted from the liner notes of Destiny's Child.

- Mark Morales – producer
- Bill Ortiz – trumpet
- Darin Prindle – mixing
- Warren Riker – engineer, mixing
- Bob Robinson – arranger, producer, multi instruments
- Tim Kelley – arranger, producer, multi instruments
- Carl Washington – producer
- Carl Wheeler – keyboards
- D'Wayne Wiggins – bass, producer, guitar, multi instruments
- Benjamin Wright – arranger, conductor
- Eric Fischer – engineer
- Jay Lincoln – drums, producer, mixing, keyboards
- James Hoover – engineer
- Erwin Gorostiza – art direction, design
- Wyclef Jean – producer, performer
- Rawle Gittens – engineer
- Vince Lars – saxophone
- Cory Rooney – programming, producer, mixing
- Craig B – producer, mixing
- KLC – producer
- Sylvia Bennett-Smith – arranger, producer
- Jerry Duplessis – producer
- Joey Swails – engineer, mixing
- Ian Dalsemer – assistant engineer
- Rob Fusari – producer
- Anthony Papa Michael – acoustic guitar
- Beyoncé Knowles – lead vocals, background vocals
- LeToya Luckett – background vocals
- LaTavia Roberson – background vocals, rap vocals on "Illusion"
- Kelly Rowland – lead vocals, background vocals
- Lee Neal – drums
- O'Dell – producer
- Mathew Knowles – executive producer
- Tina Knowles – hair stylist
- Storm Jefferson – assistant engineer, mixing assistant
- Mean Green – production coordination
- Che Greene – producer
- Darcy Aldridge – arranger
- Mike Arnold – engineer
- Charles Brackins – engineer
- Johnny Buick – make-up and hair stylist
- Kenny Demery – guitar
- Paul Empson – photography
- Eric Ferrell – make-up
- Pras – performer
- Debra Ginyard – stylist
- Mike Scott – mixing
- Booker T. Jones III – mixing
- Master P – performer
- Terry T – producer
- Bill McKinley – bass
- Paul Arnold – engineer
- Preston Crump – bass
- Jermaine Dupri – producer, performer
- Dale Everingham
- Steve Foreman – percussion
- David Frank – piano
- John Frye – engineer
- Kevin W. – second engineer
- Brian Gardner – mastering
- Jamie Hawkins – keyboards
- Vincent Herbert – producer
- Jon Jubu Smith – guitar
- Marc M2E Smith – mixing

== Charts ==
=== Weekly charts ===
1998 weekly chart performance
Chart	Peak position
Canada Top Albums/CDs (RPM)	29
Dutch Albums (Album Top 100)	30
UK Albums (Official Charts)	45
UK R&B Albums (Official Charts)	6
US Billboard 200	67
US Top R&B/Hip-Hop Albums (Billboard)	14

2000 weekly chart performance
Chart	Peak position
Canadian R&B Albums (Nielsen SoundScan)	50

=== Year-end charts ===
1998 year-end chart performance
Chart	Position
US Top R&B/Hip-Hop Albums (Billboard)	93

2001 year-end chart performance
Chart	Position
Canadian R&B Albums (Nielsen SoundScan)	146

== Certifications ==
Certifications and sales
Region	Certification	Certified units/sales
Canada (Music Canada)	2× Platinum	200,000^{^}
United Kingdom (BPI)	Gold	100,000^{^}
United States (RIAA)	Platinum	847,000
^{^} Shipments figures based on certification alone.

== Release history ==
Release dates and formats
Region	Date	Edition(s)	Format(s)	Label(s)	Ref.
United States	February 17, 1998	Standard	Cassette; CD; enhanced CD; vinyl	Columbia	
Japan	March 1, 1998	Standard	CD	Sony Japan	
United Kingdom	March 2, 1998	Standard	Cassette; CD; vinyl	Columbia	
Australia	May 15, 1998	Standard	CD	Sony	
United Kingdom	August 20, 2001	Expanded	CD	Columbia	
Germany	September 3, 2001	Expanded	CD	Sony	
