= In the Heat of the Night =

In the Heat of the Night may refer to:

- In the Heat of the Night (novel), a 1965 novel by John Ball
  - In the Heat of the Night (film), a 1967 film based on the novel
    - In the Heat of the Night (TV series), a 1988–1995 television series based on the film

== Albums ==
- In the Heat of the Night (Pat Benatar album), 1979
- In the Heat of the Night (Imagination album), 1982
- In the Heat of the Night (Jeff Lorber album), 1984
- Live – In the Heat of the Night, a 2000 album by Diamond Head

== Songs ==
- "In the Heat of the Night" (Ray Charles song), song for the 1967 film performed by Ray Charles, composed by Quincy Jones, and written by Marilyn Bergman and Alan Bergman; covered by Bill Champlin for the TV series.
- "In the Heat of the Night" (Imagination song), 1982
- "In the Heat of the Night" (Sandra song), 1985
- "In the Heat of the Night", a song by Diamond Head from Borrowed Time
- "In the Heat of the Night", a song by E-Rotic
- "In the Heat of the Night", a song by Krokus from Stampede
- "In the Heat of the Night", a song by Smokie and Pat Benatar
- "In the Heat of the Night", a song by Star Pilots

== See also ==
- Heat of the Night, a 1997 song by Aqua
- "Heat of the Night", a 1987 song by Bryan Adams
- "Heat of the Night" (Paulina Rubio song), 2011
