= Body Talk (Imagination album) =

Studio album by Imagination
- Released: 9 October 1981
- Recorded: Early–mid 1981
- Studio: Red Bus (London)
- Genres: Post-disco; funk; soul; Britfunk
- Length: 37:06
- Label: R&B
- Producer: Jolley & Swain

Imagination chronology
Body Talk (1981)	In the Heat of the Night (1982)

Singles from Body Talk
- 1. "Body Talk" Released: 1 May 1981; 2. "In and Out of Love" Released: 21 September 1981; 3. "Flashback" Released: 30 October 1981; 4. "Burnin' Up" Released: February 1982 (US-only release)

Professional ratings
Review scores
Source	Rating
Allmusic	4/5 stars
Encyclopedia of Popular Music	3/5 stars
Robert Christgau	B+

Body Talk is the debut album by British soul/dance group Imagination, produced by Steve Jolley and Tony Swain and released in October 1981. It is one of the earliest albums of its genre to have a distinctive 'British' sound as opposed to being an attempt to recreate contemporary American styles.

The title track was an immediate hit, reaching No. 4 on the UK singles chart. Two further singles, "In and Out of Love" and "Flashback", also reached the top 20. The album itself peaked at No. 20.

Body Talk proved to be an enduring album, with the tracks "So Good, So Right" and "Burnin' Up" being cited as influential and ahead of their time (the latter has been acknowledged by Frankie Knuckles as a key track in the development of house music).

== Track listing ==
All tracks composed by Steve Jolley, Tony Swain, Leee John, Ashley Ingram and Errol Kennedy

1. "Body Talk" - 6:01
2. "So Good, So Right" - 6:58
3. "Burnin' Up" - 4:45
4. "Tell Me Do You Want My Love" - 5:27
5. "Flashback" - 4:30
6. "I'll Always Love You (But Don't Look Back)" - 3:54
7. "In and Out of Love" - 5:31

In July 1982, with the success of "Just an Illusion", the album was re-released in the US as an 8-track album, with the single version of "Just an Illusion" included as the fourth track.

== Personnel ==
Musicians

- Leee John – lead vocals, keyboards
- Ashley Ingram – bass, vocals
- Errol Kennedy – drums, percussion
- Orphy Robinson – vibraphone on "In and Out of Love"
- Tony Swain – additional keyboards
- Steve Jolley – additional percussion

Technical

- Tony Swain – engineer, producer, arrangement
- Steve Jolley – engineer, producer, arrangement
- Richard Lengyel – assistant engineer
- Tony Bridge – cutting engineer
- Morgan Khan – engineer, executive producer
- Eliot Cohen – executive producer
- Ellis Elias – executive producer
- Terry Pastor – illustration
- Chess Creative Services – design, artwork
- John Ridley – photography

== Charts ==
Weekly chart performance for Body Talk
Chart (1981–82)	Peak position
German Albums (Offizielle Top 100)	37
Norwegian Albums (VG-lista)	21
Swedish Albums (Sverigetopplistan)	7
UK Albums (Official Charts)	20
US Top R&B/Hip-Hop Albums (Billboard)	46

Annual chart rankings for Body Talk
Chart (1982)	Rank
Italian Albums (Musica e Dischi)	10
