= Errol Kennedy =

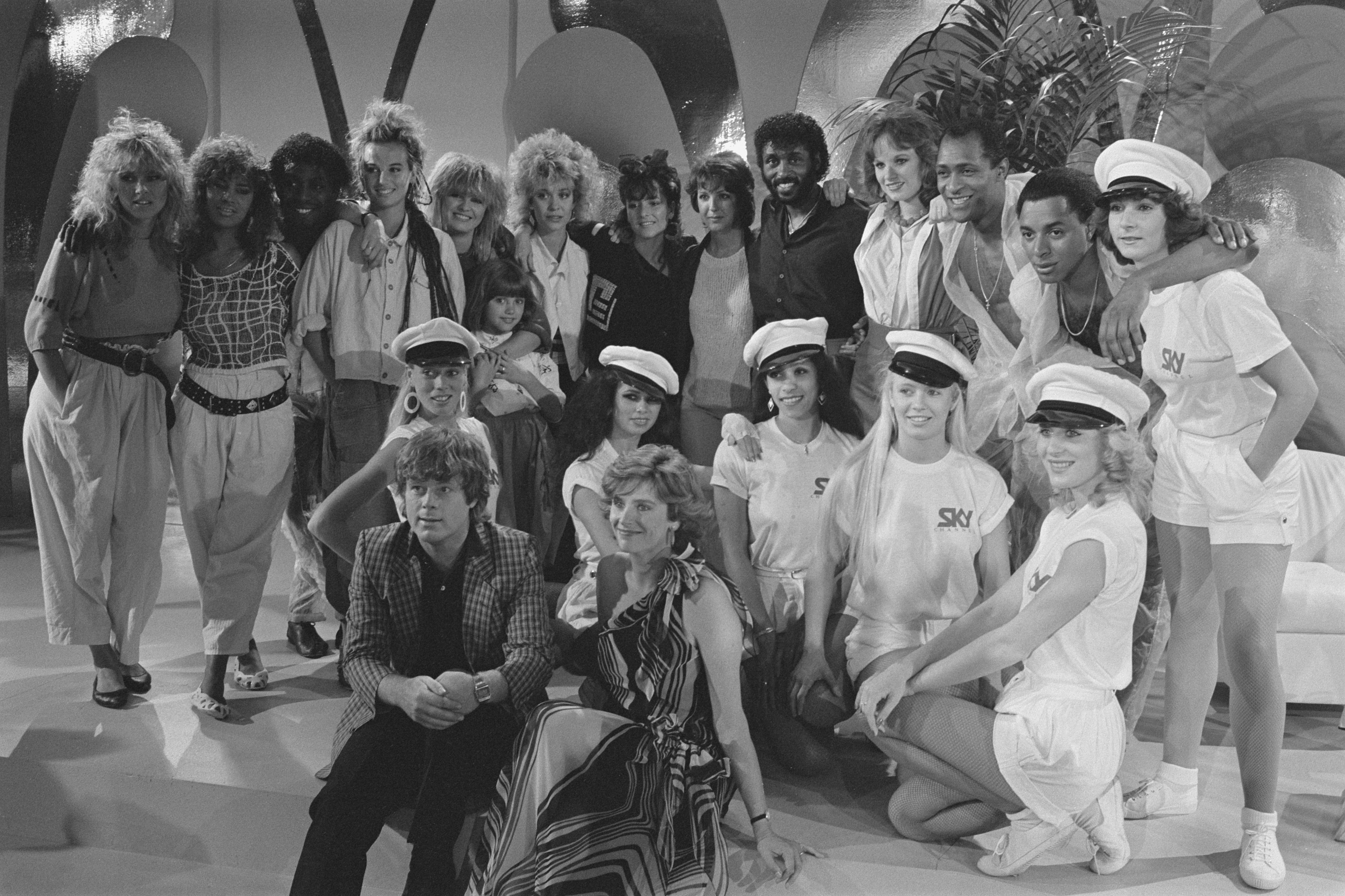
- Imagination, 1984 (3rd, 11th & 12th from left)

Background information
- Born: 9 June 1953 (age 73)
- Origin: Montego Bay, Jamaica
- Genres: Soul, pop, funk, dance, R&B, boogie, electro
- Occupations: Musician, drummer, singer, songwriter, producer, music arranger, composer
- Years active: 1968–present
- Labels: M&R Records, R&B, RCA
- Website: www.errolkennedy.com

Errol Kennedy (born 9 June 1953 in Montego Bay, Jamaica) is a Jamaican-British musician (drummer, singer), songwriter, composer, producer and original member of the British soul, funk and pop band Imagination.

== Career ==
Kennedy learned to play drums at a young age. Before co-founding the British three-piece soul, pop and funk band Imagination with Ashley Ingram and Leee John in London in early 1981, he was a member in two other soul-funk bands, Midnight Express and TFB/Central Line (Typical Funk Band).

Imagination's first UK hit single, "Body Talk", produced by Jolley & Swain, spent 18 weeks on the UK Singles Chart and reached number 4 in May 1981. This was quickly followed by two other top 20 hit singles, "In and Out of Love" and "Flashback", both co-written by Kennedy. Their biggest hit, "Just an Illusion", peaked at number two in March 1982. The trio frequently appeared on Top of the Pops and other pop music programmes.

After the break-up of Imagination, Kennedy continued both as a musician and producer. He worked with Hugh Masekela at Bray Film Studios to produce the soundtrack for the film Soweto, and during the 1990s either toured or produced with bands such as Odyssey, Shalamar, Rose Royce, Grace Kennedy, Jamiroquai, Frankie Knuckles, Larry Levan, Arthur Baker, Colonel Abrams and Simon Ellis.

Since 2009, Kennedy has been performing live on stage with his band ImagiNation feat. Errol Kennedy. They toured the UK in 2010–2011, followed by a performance at London's IndigO2 alongside the Three Degrees and Linda Lewis, as well as various events and festivals across Germany in 2012.

Kennedy released Imagination's official 30th anniversary single "Just an Illusion" (featuring T'Mar) on M&R Records in May 2013, which is a re-production of Imagination's biggest hit. The single was taken from the forthcoming anniversary album, New Dimension, released later that year.

In 2016, Kennedy released the new track "You Can Be (All You Want to Be)" on 29 April, which is featured on his compilation album Greatest Hits (Live). Kennedy has also broadened his talents as the author of Flying Machines and Their Heroes, a series that brings some of the greatest stories in aviation history.
