= List of number-one hits of 1982 (Italy) =

This is a list of number-one songs in 1982 on the Italian charts compiled weekly by the Italian Hit Parade Singles Chart.

== Chart history ==
Issue date	Song	Artist(s)	Ref.
January 2	"Cicale"	Heather Parisi	
January 9	"Reality"	Richard Sanderson	
January 16	"Reality"	Richard Sanderson	
January 23	"Reality"	Richard Sanderson	
January 30	"Reality"	Richard Sanderson	
February 6	"Reality"	Richard Sanderson	
February 13	"Reality"	Richard Sanderson	
February 20	"Reality"	Richard Sanderson	
February 27	"Reality"	Richard Sanderson	
March 6	"Storie Di Tutti I Giorni"	Riccardo Fogli	
March 13	"Storie Di Tutti I Giorni"	Riccardo Fogli	
March 20	"Storie Di Tutti I Giorni"	Riccardo Fogli	
March 27	"Felicità"	Al Bano and Romina Power	
April 3	"Storie Di Tutti I Giorni"	Riccardo Fogli	
April 10	"Non Succederà Più"	Claudia Mori	
April 17	"Non Succederà Più"	Claudia Mori	
April 24	"Il Ballo Del Qua Qua"	Romina Power	
May 1	"Non Succederà Più"	Claudia Mori	
May 8	"Non Succederà Più"	Claudia Mori	
May 15	"Paradise"	Phoebe Cates	
May 22	"Paradise"	Phoebe Cates	
May 29	"Paradise"	Phoebe Cates	
June 5	"Paradise"	Phoebe Cates	
June 12	"Paradise"	Phoebe Cates	
June 19	"Paradise"	Phoebe Cates	
June 26	"Paradise"	Phoebe Cates	
July 3	"Paradise"	Phoebe Cates	
July 10	"Paradise"	Phoebe Cates	
July 17	"Paradise"	Phoebe Cates	
July 24	"Bravi Ragazzi"	Miguel Bosé	
July 31	"Bravi Ragazzi"	Miguel Bosé	
August 7	"Avrai"	Claudio Baglioni	
August 14	"Bravi Ragazzi"	Miguel Bosé	
August 21	"Bravi Ragazzi"	Miguel Bosé	
August 28	"Bravi Ragazzi"	Miguel Bosé	
September 4	"Bravi Ragazzi"	Miguel Bosé	
September 11	"Bravi Ragazzi"	Miguel Bosé	
September 18	"Bravi Ragazzi"	Miguel Bosé	
September 25	"Avrai"	Claudio Baglioni	
October 2	"Music & Lights"	Imagination	
October 9	"Music & Lights"	Imagination	
October 16	"Der Kommissar"	Falco	
October 23	"Der Kommissar"	Falco	
October 30	"Der Kommissar"	Falco	
November 6	"Der Kommissar"	Falco	
November 13	"Der Kommissar"	Falco	
November 20	"Der Kommissar"	Falco	
November 27	"Der Kommissar"	Falco	
December 4	"Der Kommissar"	Falco	
December 11	"Der Kommissar"	Falco	
December 18	"Der Kommissar"	Falco	
December 25	"Der Kommissar"	Falco	

== Number-one artists ==
Position	Artist	Weeks #1
1	Falco	11
2	Phoebe Cates	10
3	Miguel Bosé	8
3	Richard Sanderson	8
4	Claudia Mori	4
4	Riccardo Fogli	4
5	Claudio Baglioni	2
5	Imagination	2
5	Romina Power	2
6	Al Bano	1
6	Heather Parisi	1
