= Instinctual =

Instinctual may refer to:

- Instinct, the inherent inclination of a living organism
- Instinctual, single by ElectroVamp 2014
- Instinctual (Romanthony album) 1999
- Instinctual (song) by Imagination
