= Shake It Off (Mariah Carey song) =

2005 single by Mariah Carey

Single by Mariah Carey

from the album The Emancipation of Mimi
- A-side: "Get Your Number"
- B-side: "Secret Love"
- Released: July 11, 2005
- Recorded: 2004
- Studio: Honeywest (New York City); Southside (Atlanta, Georgia)
- Genre: R&B
- Length: 3:52
- Label: Island; Mercury
- Songwriters: Mariah Carey; Jermaine Mauldin; Bryan-Michael Cox; Johntá Austin
- Producers: Jermaine Dupri; Bryan-Michael Cox; Mariah Carey

Mariah Carey singles chronology
"We Belong Together" (2005)	"Shake It Off" (2005)	"Get Your Number" (2005)

Music video
- "Shake It Off" on YouTube

"Shake It Off" is a song by American singer Mariah Carey for her tenth studio album, The Emancipation of Mimi (2005). It was written by Carey along with Jermaine Dupri, Bryan-Michael Cox, and Johntá Austin, and produced by the former three. The song was serviced to radio on July 11, 2005, by Island and Mercury Records as the album's third single in the United States, while "Get Your Number" served as the album's third single elsewhere. Described by Dupri as "ghetto," the track is a R&B song that makes use of pop and hip hop influences and a simple, sparse production. Lyrically, the song follows Carey as she moves on from her relationship with an unfaithful lover, packing her things and breaking up with him over an answering machine.

The song was well received by music critics, with many complimenting its simple yet inspirational lyrics, as well as calling it a standout track from the album. It peaked at number two on the US Billboard Hot 100, blocked by Carey's own "We Belong Together" for its first of six weeks at that position. Furthermore, it marked the first time a female lead artist occupied the top two positions of the Hot 100. The song also peaked at numbers six and five in Australia and New Zealand, and numbers fifteen and nine in Ireland and the United Kingdom, respectively.

The song's music video, directed by Jake Nava features numerous extravagant wardrobe changes and starred actor Chris Tucker. The video was nominated for Best R&B Video at the 2006 MTV Video Music Awards. "Shake It Off" was performed live by Carey on several televised events, including the 2005 MTV Video Music Awards, the 2005 World Music Awards and British program Top of the Pops. Additionally it was performed as a five-piece concert on Good Morning America, and on the New Year's Eve special titled, Dick Clark's New Year's Rockin' Eve with Ryan Seacrest. "Shake It Off" was included on the set-lists of The Adventures of Mimi Tour (2006), the Angels Advocate Tour (2010), The Elusive Chanteuse Show (2014), The Sweet Sweet Fantasy Tour (2016), the All The Hits Tour with Lionel Richie (2017) and her second concert residency, The Butterfly Returns (2018).

== Background ==
Carey had produced back-to-back commercially and critically failing albums, Glitter (2001) and Charmbracelet (2002). After the release of "Charmbracelet", and its succeeding tour, Carey began working on The Emancipation of Mimi, her tenth studio effort. By November 2004, Carey had already recorded several songs for the album. Island Records head L.A. Reid suggested Carey to compose a few more strong singles to ensure the project's commercial success. Noting that she had written some of her best work with Jermaine Dupri, Reid recommended that Carey meet with Dupri for a brief studio session. Carey took Reid's advice and headed to Atlanta to collaborate with Dupri. During this two-day trip, the duo wrote and produced "Shake It Off" and "Get Your Number," which were eventually released as the album's third and fourth singles. Following this recording session, "Shake It Off" was briefly selected as the album's lead single, replacing the two other contenders "Stay The Night" and "Say Somethin'". Dupri explained to MTV News:

I had that beat actually before she got to the studio. So she came in, she heard that beat and was like, 'Yeah, that's what I want.' That was one of the first records we had. I didn't really know what to do for her because I didn't hear nothing else that was on the album, but I just felt like she didn't have that bounce on her album.

== Composition ==
"Shake It Off"
A sample of "Shake It Off", featuring Carey's lower range and breathy vocals, which critics noted for its "narrow range" until the climax.

"Shake It Off" is a mid-tempo R&B song with a pop and hip hop backbeat and a "thumping", sparse production. Written by Carey, Jermaine Dupri, Bryan-Michael Cox, and Johntá Austin, and produced by the former three, the song drew comparisons to several productions from Usher's 2004 album, Confessions. According to the sheet music published at Musicnotes.com by W.B.M. Music Corporation, "Shake It Off" is set in common time with a tempo of 66 beats per minute. It is composed in the key of D major with Carey's vocal range spanning from the low-note of D_{3} to the high-note of G#_{6}. The song follows in the chord progression of Bm_{7}–Am_{7}–Gmaj_{7} The verses and chorus remain in a narrow voice range, until according to Jon Pareles of The New York Times, Carey "gives herself a few of her old sky-high notes as a background flourish" near the song's end. According to Carey's album guide in Rolling Stone, Dupri leaves his trademark on the album's best tracks including "Shake It Off", with the track's production and beat described as "syncopated" and "bouncy."

Lyrically, the song features a message of female strength, the song lyrics were described as "goofy" and "fun" by Larry Katz from the Boston Herald. Reading "Just like the Calgon commercial / I really gotta get up out of here", Carey tells her lover that she is leaving him, making a "clever" reference to a commercial. In regards to the latter lyrics, Lawrence Farber from the Windy City Times wrote "they are a playful approach to bitterness—and, more specifically, a cheatin' bad apple." She then sings "By the time you get this message / It's gonna be too late / So don't bother paging me / 'Cause I'll be on my way," establishing that the relationship is over, and that he shouldn't even try to mend the situation. She also makes reference to his infidelity, "with this one and that one / By the pool, on the beach, in the streets." In an interview with MTV News, Dupri discussed the song's composition:

"'Shake It Off' was just like ... That comes from that style of I guess [Usher's] Confessions and just that bounce. It's got a lot of ingredients to it because I never thought that Mariah could make a bouncy type of record. When you hear that song — the whole bounce of the record and the way she's flipping it and the stuff she talking about ... I knew that record was gonna go just because you never heard Mariah talk about this stuff. ... She's like, 'I packed up my Louis Vuitton.' She took it really on the ghetto side. I knew that was gonna strike people. Either it was gonna hit them in a wrong way or they was gonna love it.

== Critical reception ==
"Shake It Off" was met with generally positive reviews from music critics. AllMusic editor Stephen Thomas Erlewine picked "Shake It Off" as a top pick from the album. Michael Paoletta, writing for Billboard, gave the song a positive review, complimenting its lyrics, production and Carey's vocals. He concluded his review with his assurance that the song would be a success, writing "After 'We Belong Together' brought her back to radio big time, 'Shake It Off' will take Carey's good fortune to the next step." Some critics compared the song heavily to Usher's material from his 2004 album, Confessions. Sal Cinquemani from Slant Magazine wrote "Mariah too heavily bites on the styles of her successors: Usher by way of Dupri on 'Shake It Off'," while Dan Gennoe of Yahoo! Music UK said the song was "Usher-lite". Lawrence Ferber from the Windy City Times described "Shake It Off" as a "standout" track from the album. When discussing the track with Ferber, Carey described the song as her favorite from The Emancipation of Mimi: "Shake it off can apply to anything. Whatever personal dramas we go through, put that song on and you lose the anxiety or intensity of the moment. I'll listen to that song when I've just come out of an annoying meeting. I gotta shake this off." While Todd Burns from Stylus Magazine described it as "sultry", a writer from the Fort Worth Star-Telegram called it "lyrically crude" and "ghetto". Similarly, The Michigan Daily's Chris Gaerig criticized Carey's "airy vocals" and wrote "Carey sounds like a 13-year-old boy going through puberty, singing love songs to a grade school crush."

== Chart performance ==
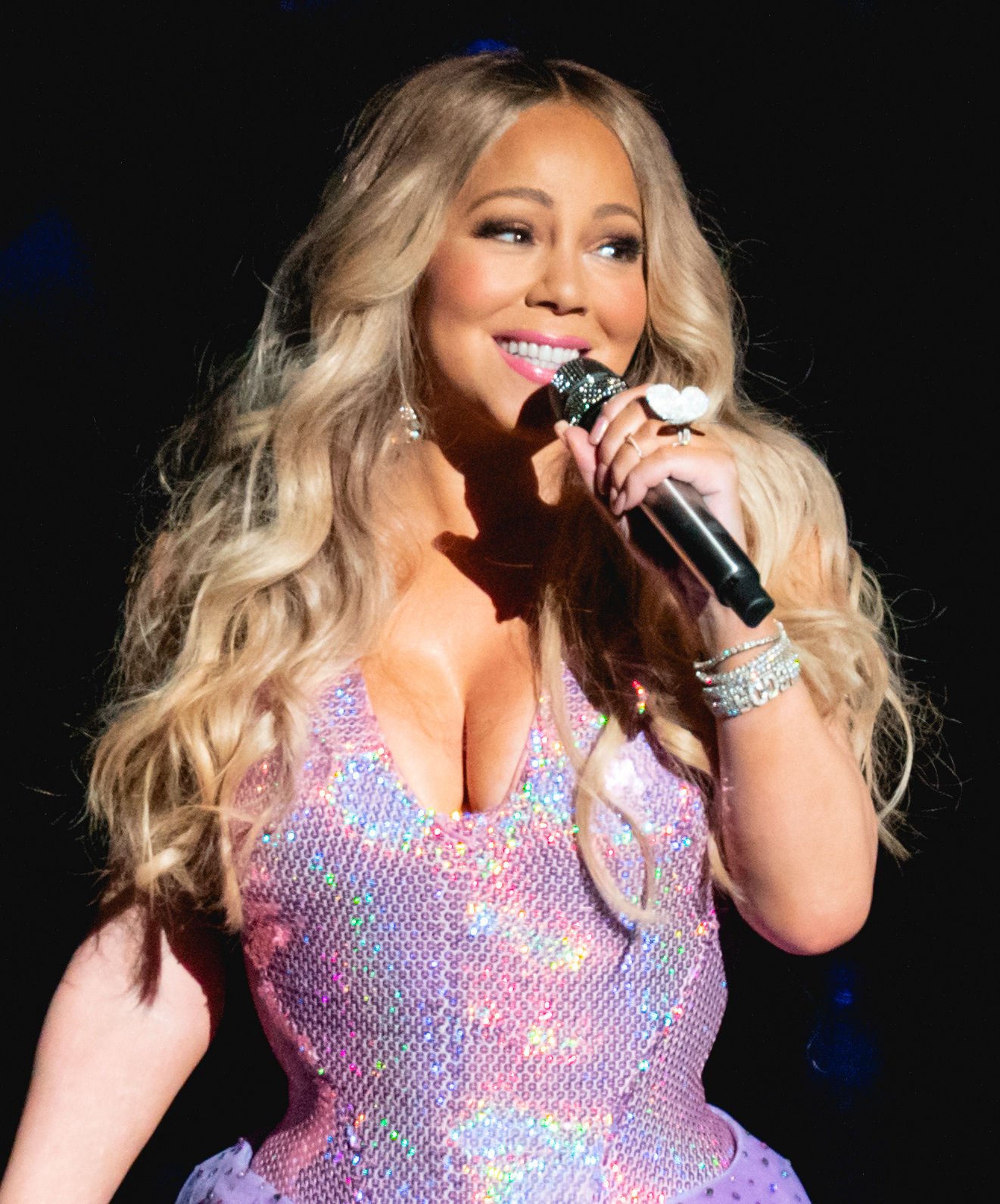
"Shake It Off" was barred from the number one position on the US Billboard Hot 100 by herself with "We Belong Together".

In the United States, "Shake It Off" entered the Billboard Hot 100 at number 66, the week's highest debut. In its seventh week on the chart, it reached number two behind Carey's previous single, "We Belong Together," marking the first time a female lead artist occupied the top two positions of the Hot 100. "Shake It Off" was at the number two position for an additional five weeks after "We Belong Together" fell from number one (six weeks in total); it was subsequently held off the top spot by Kanye West's "Gold Digger". The song stayed within the Hot 100 for 26 weeks, and finished at number fifteen on the Billboard Year-End Chart. The single fared well on multiple Billboard component charts, reaching the top spot on the Mainstream Top 40 (Pop Songs) tally, and becoming her second consecutive number-one on the chart following "We Belong Together" as well as her sixth number-one overall. It peaked at number two on the Hot R&B/Hip-Hop Songs, and number 27 on the Hot Dance Club Play chart. "Shake It Off" was certified 2xPlatinum by the Recording Industry Association of America for shipments of over 2,000,000 copies.

"Shake It Off" was released throughout Australia and New Zealand as the third single from The Emancipation of Mimi in late 2005. In the United Kingdom and other European territories, it was released as a double A-side along with "Get Your Number," the third single serviced to the United States at the same time. The single performed well outside the United States, reaching number five and six on the New Zealand Singles Chart and Australian Singles Chart, respectively. The single was later certified Gold in Australia by the Australian Recording Industry Association (ARIA), denoting shipments of over 35,000 units. On the UK Singles Chart, the song debuted at number nine during the week of October 15, 2005. Dropping to number ten the following week, the song lasted a total of eight weeks in the singles chart before making its descent.

== Remix ==
"Shake It Off" became another remix in which Carey would feature a hip-hop artist, having done so several times in the past. Most notably, Carey began incorporating hip-hop and pop from her 1995 remix of her single "Fantasy", which featured rap verses from Ol' Dirty Bastard (O.D.B.). The song was considered one of the pioneering songs that began the infusion of the "thug-love duet". According to Kelefa Sanneh of The New York Times, the song "Nowadays clean-cut pop stars are expected to collaborate with roughneck rappers, but when Ms. Carey teamed up with Ol' Dirty Bastard, of the Wu-Tang Clan, for the 1995 hit 'Fantasy (Remix),' it was a surprise, and a smash." Originally intended to feature only Jay-Z, the remix included rising rapper Young Jeezy, who considered the position the "highest-profile guest appearance to date" that he had been offered. In an interview with MTV News, Jeezy described how he came to be included on the remix:

When I got the call [from Mariah], I was like, 'I don't know if that's me. She was like, 'Nah, it's gonna be your type of beat.' I'm like, 'Oh, for real?' Then when Hov called he said, 'I'm gonna do it with you.' I was like, 'Dag, this is big.' But when I did it, I kept it me and kept it 'hood. At first I ain't think she was gonna like it but she called and said she loved it. From there it was a wrap. That's history. Mariah is known for doing remixes with street cats from Mobb Deep to O.D.B., so to be a part of that was a good look for me and the Def Jam movement.

According to Jayanathi Daniel, writer of The New York Sun, Carey's remixes of "Shake If Off" and "It's Like That" helped cement her impression on the music scene during the release of The Emancipation of Mimi, writing "the multiple mix tapes, further legitimized her return." In a review of Jay-Z's material at the time, an editor at XXL rated the remix two out of five stars, criticizing his lyrics and "swag", which he felt were missing during lines reading "The Emancipation of M-I-M-I / I spray semi rrrah, rrrrah / Twenty worldwide nigga get your plaques / Guess who the fuck got his swagger back?". He concluded on a mixed note, writing "With run-of-the-mill punchlines and a dated reference to How Stella Got Her Groove Back, Jay seems to be missing some of his usual swagger on this white label–only remix."

== Music video ==
=== Background ===
The song's music video was originally scheduled to be directed by Brett Ratner, who had shot Carey's previous two videos. However, Jake Nava was used as the director instead, as Ratner had other obligations regarding one of his films. It was filmed during the end of June 2005. When describing the video's concept to MTV News, Carey said "I actually just got the treatment. We came up with some cool concepts." When asked for a more detailed synopsis, Carey declined and responded "It's "really technical. It's a new approach that I would have to let [the director] explain. It's new territory." During a scene in the video in which Carey had to wear very high-heeled pumps, she had the video crew carry her to various sections of the set. When Nava suggested she wear a pair of sensible flat footwear in between shoots, Carey jokingly replied "my feet repel them dahling." When recalling the moment in a later interview, Carey claimed her feet were "in agony" and said "My high heels had left my feet bleeding. Laugh all you want, my feet hurt."

=== Synopsis ===
Carey ending her relationship with her lover via an answering machine. The image also shows the singer wearing the high heels, which required her assistance for moving around in them.

The single's video was directed by Jake Nava, and contains numerous wardrobe changes by Carey in a storyline involving luxurious scenery in which the singer leaves her significant other. It is presented in one continuous shot, with no edits. The video begins with a TV screen and the word 'Mimi' appearing, while on the monitor, Dupri raps his introduction. As the television fades, Carey is then shown lying in a bathtub overflowing with water and rose petals, with her hair flowing over the side of the tub. Next, the camera follows down one floor of the mansion to find Carey, decked out in bright blue makeup and high heels, as she sings "By the time you get this message / It's gonna be too late / So don't bother paging me / 'Cause I'll be on my way," into the phone, which she then throws against the wall. A short scene is then shown of her lover in a strip club, receiving the message Carey had sent him. As he reads it, he blows smoke into the screen, fading to reveal Carey dressed in a sleeveless black coat and dress, before grabbing her bag and heading out the door as she sings, "So I packed up my Louis Vuitton / Jumped in your ride and took off."

As she leaves the mansion, she exits into "Emancipation Street", a ghetto looking plaza made up entirely of props and hand made stores on a painted backdrop. With shops named "So So Fetch" and "Pink Yet Lavender", Carey then walks up to a brick wall, where she passes Dupri, who makes a cameo appearance. As she leans on the wall, her coat slips off, and two schoolgirls do a shake dance at the pay phones. As the camera pans upwards to the wall to a sign featuring a photo of Carey and the song's title, Carey then appears driving away in a Lamborghini Murciélago speaking on her PDA with Chris Tucker, who as a cameo, appears on the set of the video shoot, as the man in the passenger's seat. As Carey leaves her lover a second message, he is seen frolicking pool-side with two other women, while she says "with this one and that one / By the pool, on the beach, in the streets." Her phone breaks up as she drives past the "Hollyhood" sign, so she tells him, "Hold on," singing, "Save this recording, because I'm never coming back home." Carey is then shown on bleachers at a high school football game, with Da Brat featured as a cameo act, as she argues with a man in the background. She writes 'MiMi' on one of the bleachers and the letters transform into a large shiny "MIMI" sign made of lights, which appear in large, vibrant lights. Carey walks up to a microphone in front of the large 'MIMI' lights, and dances and sings in front of the camera, wearing a revealing black ensemble and leopard print boots. In the final scene, Carey is seen on a beach, as she slips out of her robe and walks into the sunset, with the glare obscuring whether she's wearing any clothing.

=== Reception ===
The video was nominated for a MTV Video Music Award at the 2006 ceremony, in the category of Best R&B Video, but lost to Beyoncé's "Check On It". The song's music video generated strong public reaction, topping the Total Request Live (TRL) music video countdown in its second week in release. Additionally, the music video received strong rotation on MTV, VH1 and BET, having over 500,000 requests in its first 24 hours. Similarly, at the time, music videos were predominantly watched on television, as sites like YouTube were not yet popular. During this period, Yahoo! and AOL began allowing the public to view videos free of charge on their website, allowing them to stream as well. After the launch of the websites, Billboard announced that the video for "Shake It Off" had generated over two million requests on its first day of release, setting a record at the time for the websites. It peaked at number two on Billboard's Hot Videoclip Tracks chart. The video was well received by fans and critics alike, with a writer from The Sacramento Bee writing how he thought it was impressive that Carey at 35, and with over fifteen years in the business, had arranged such a popular video. He also described it as "sassy, fun and ghetto", while outing it as one of her best videos.

== Live performances ==
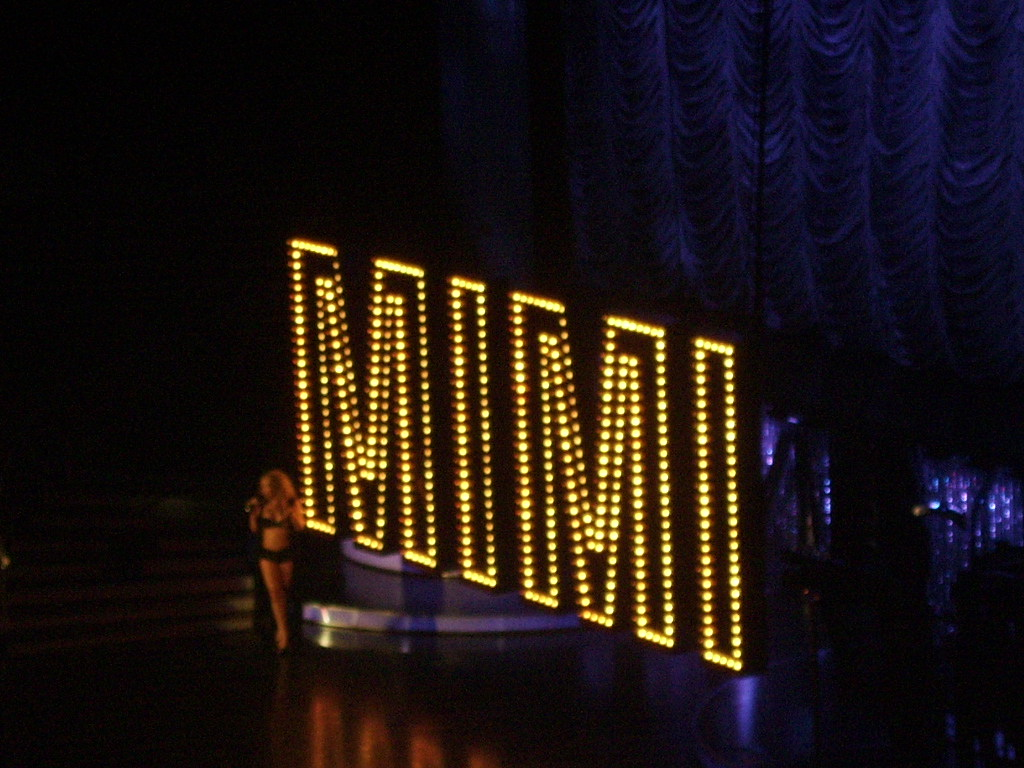
A still of Carey performing "Shake It Off" during The Adventures of Mimi Tour (2006). Carey is shown walking down the spiral staircase, onto the main stage, as the Broadway-styled 'MIMI' prop descend from the rafters.

Following the release of "It's Like That", Carey embarked on several stateside, European and Asian promotional tours in support of The Emancipation of Mimi, as well as its accompanying singles. In the United Kingdom, Carey filmed a two-part appearance on the British music program Top of the Pops, performing "It's Like That", "We Belong Together" and "Shake It Off". After returning to the United States for the a string of televised performances, Carey performed "Shake It Off" at Good Morning America. On August 3, USA Today announced that Carey would be added to the roster of performers at the 2005 MTV Video Music Awards, held on the 28th of the month. The ceremony was held at the American Airlines Arena in downtown Miami Beach Florida, with Carey's performance taking place at the National Hotel in South Beach. Apart from The Killers, she was the only performer to tape their appearance from an undisclosed location in Miami. After being introduced by Eva Longoria, Carey appeared on a long stage in the hotel's courtyard, with Dupri opening the song with his rap verses in a nearby cabana. After performing "Shake It Off" and the official remix version of "We Belong Together," Carey made her way into the shallow pool, followed by Dupri and the back-up dancers.

At the 2005 World Music Awards, Carey performed "Shake It Off" alongside Dupri. Wearing black shorts and a pink blouse, the performance started as Carey got out of a Lamborghini Murciélago on stage, a re-enactment of the video. Additionally, a large lighted 'MIMI' sign was placed behind the stage, also a prop used at the end of the song's music video. The following week, Carey performed the song, as well as its accompanying number "Get Your Number," on the British music chart program, Top of the Pops. On November 15, 2005, the Chicago Tribune announced that Carey would perform during half-time of the Thanksgiving game between the Detroit Lions and the Atlanta Falcons. Airing on the 24th, Carey performed "Shake It Off", as well as her newly released single from the album's re-release, "Don't Forget About Us". Two months later, she celebrated the new year on television, placing as the featured performer at the Times Square Ball drop on New Year's Eve in New York. The special, titled Dick Clark's New Year's Rockin' Eve with Ryan Seacrest, aired on ABC at 10 pm on December 31, and featured Carey on stage wearing a short sparkling dress, and performing a selection of the album's singles, including "Shake It Off".

Aside from performing the song live on several high-profile televised events, Carey included the song on both her Adventures of Mimi and Angels Advocate Tours. On the former tour, the performance began as a large Broadway-styled prop reading 'MIMI', similar to the one from the video, descended from the rafters. As the song began, Carey walked down a spiraled staircase, ushered by one of her several back up dancers. Sporting a black bikini and matching sheer cape, Carey sang the song while, according to some critics, performing some of her most diverse physical movements from the entire show. On her Angels Advocate Tour, Carey performed the song during the first quarter of the concert. According to Ryan J. Downey of MTV News, Carey gave a "rousing rendition" of the song, and "set the tone for what felt like a celebratory evening."

== Formats and track listings ==
Australian limited edition CD maxi-single

1. "Shake It Off" – 3:52
2. "Shake It Off" (Instrumental) – 3:56
3. "Secret Love" – 3:09
4. "Shake It Off" (Video)

Get Your Number / Shake It Off UK 2-track CD single

1. "Get Your Number" (feat. Jermaine Dupri) – 3:18
2. "Shake It Off" – 3:54

Get Your Number / Shake It Off European CD maxi-single; European 12-inch vinyl

1. "Get Your Number" (feat. Jermaine Dupri) – 3:18
2. "Shake It Off" – 3:54
3. "Secret Love" – 3:09

Shake It Off MC30 single

1. "Shake It Off" – 3:52
2. "Shake It Off" (Remix feat. Jay-Z & Young Jeezy) – 5:03
3. "Shake It Off" (Instrumental) – 3:54

== Credits and personnel ==
Credits for The Emancipation of Mimi adapted from the album's liner notes.

- Mariah Carey – songwriting, producer, vocals, background vocals
- Jermaine Dupri – songwriting, producer
- Johntá Austin – songwriting, background vocals
- Bryan-Michael Cox – songwriting, producer
- Phil Tan – audio mixing
- Herb Power – mastering
- Brian Frye – engineer
- John Horesco – engineer

== Charts ==
=== Weekly charts ===
Chart (2005)	Peak position
Australia (ARIA)	6
Australian Urban (ARIA)	2
Brazil (Crowley Broadcast Analysis)	32
Canada CHR/Pop Top 30 (Radio & Records)	1
European Hot 100 Singles (Billboard)	31
Ireland (IRMA) with "Get Your Number"	15
New Zealand (Recorded Music NZ)	5
Scottish Singles Sales (Official Charts) with "Get Your Number"	23
UK Singles (Official Charts) with "Get Your Number"	9
UK Hip Hop/R&B (Official Charts) with "Get Your Number"	2
US Billboard Hot 100	2
US Dance Club Songs (Billboard)	23
US Dance Airplay (Billboard)	14
US Hot R&B/Hip-Hop Songs (Billboard)	2
US Pop Airplay (Billboard)	1
US Pop 100 (Billboard)	2
US Rhythmic Airplay (Billboard)	1

=== Year-end charts ===
Chart (2005)	Position
Australia (ARIA)	84
Australia Urban (ARIA)	33
UK Singles (OCC) with "Get Your Number"	117
US Billboard Hot 100	15
US Hot R&B/Hip-Hop Songs (Billboard)	25
US Mainstream Top 40 (Billboard)	22
US Pop 100 (Billboard)	29
US Rhythmic Airplay (Billboard)	14
US CHR/Pop (Radio & Records)	24
US CHR/Rhythmic (Radio & Records)	17
US Urban (Radio & Records)	31
US Urban AC (Radio & Records)	47

Chart (2006)	Position
US Hot R&B/Hip-Hop Songs (Billboard)	80

== Certifications ==
Region	Certification	Certified units/sales
Australia (ARIA)	Gold	35,000^{^}
New Zealand (RMNZ)	Platinum	30,000^{‡}
United States (RIAA)	2× Platinum	2,000,000^{‡}
United States (RIAA) Mastertone	Gold	500,000^{*}
^{*} Sales figures based on certification alone.^{^} Shipments figures based on certification alone.^{‡} Sales+streaming figures based on certification alone.

== Release history ==
Region	Date	Format(s)	Label(s)	Ref.
United States	July 11, 2005	Contemporary hit; rhythmic contemporary; urban radio	Island	
Australia	October 3, 2005	CD	Island	
United Kingdom	October 3, 2005	CD (with "Get Your Number")	Island	
Various	January 29, 2021	EP	Def Jam	

== See also ==
- List of artists with the most number ones on the Billboard Mainstream Top 40 chart
