= 1998 Soul Train Lady of Soul Awards =

American awards show

Soul Train Lady of Soul Awards
- Date: September 3, 1998
- Location: Santa Monica Civic Auditorium, Santa Monica, California
- Country: United States
- Hosted by: Brandy, LL Cool J, Brian McKnight

Highlights
- Most awards: Destiny's Child (3)

The 1998 Soul Train Lady of Soul Awards were held on September 3, 1998, at the Santa Monica Civic Auditorium in Santa Monica, California. Produced by Don Cornelius Productions, the fourth annual awards program was co-hosted by Brandy, LL Cool J and Brian McKnight.

== Special awards ==
=== Aretha Franklin Award for Entertainer of the Year ===
- Mariah Carey

=== Lena Horne Award for Outstanding Career Achievement ===
- Chaka Khan

== Winners and nominees ==
Winners are in bold text.

=== Best R&B/Soul Single – Solo ===
- **Erykah Badu – "Tyrone"**
  - Mary J. Blige – "Seven Days"
  - Aretha Franklin – "A Rose Is Still a Rose"
  - Janet Jackson – "I Get Lonely"

=== Best R&B/Soul Single – Group, Band or Duo ===
- **Destiny's Child – "No, No, No"**
  - SWV – "Rain"
  - Total – "What About Us?"
  - Xscape – "The Arms of the One Who Loves You"

=== R&B/Soul Album of the Year – Solo ===
- **Erykah Badu – Live**
  - Mary J. Blige – Share My World
  - Aretha Franklin – A Rose Is Still a Rose
  - Janet Jackson – The Velvet Rope

=== R&B/Soul Album of the Year – Group, Band or Duo ===
- **Destiny's Child – Destiny's Child**
  - Changing Faces – All Day, All Night
  - En Vogue – EV3
  - SWV – Release Some Tension

=== Best R&B/Soul or Rap New Artist ===
- **Destiny's Child – "No, No, No"**
  - Mýa and Sisqó – "It's All About Me"
  - Queen Pen – "A Party Ain't a Party"
  - Sparkle – "Be Careful"

=== Best R&B/Soul or Rap Music Video ===
- **Lil' Kim – "Not Tonight"**
  - Foxy Brown featuring Dru Hill – "Big Bad Mama"
  - Janet Jackson – "I Get Lonely"
  - K. P. & Envyi – "Swing My Way"

=== Best Gospel Album ===
- **Karen Clark Sheard – Finally Karen**
  - Shirley Caesar – A Miracle in Harlem
  - Dottie Peoples – Testify
- Vickie Winans – Live in Detroit

=== Best Jazz Album ===
- **Diana Krall – Love Scenes**
  - Dee Dee Bridgewater – Dear Ella
  - Abbey Lincoln – Who Used to Dance
  - Dianne Reeves – That Day

=== R&B/Soul or Rap Song of the Year ===
- **Erykah Badu – "Tyrone"**
  - Changing Faces – "G.H.E.T.T.O.U.T."
  - Destiny's Child – "No, No, No"
  - Refugee Camp All-Stars featuring Lauryn Hill – "The Sweetest Thing"
