= Music and Lights =

Single by Imagination

from the album In the Heat of the Night
- Released: 11 June 1982
- Genre: Post-disco, new wave, R&B, funk
- Length: 5:22
- Label: R&B
- Songwriters: Steve Jolley; Tony Swain; Leee John; Ashley Ingram
- Producer: Jolley & Swain

Imagination singles chronology
"Just an Illusion" (1982)	"Music and Lights" (1982)	"In the Heat of the Night" (1982)

"Music and Lights" is a single by British trio Imagination, released in 1982 by R&B Records. It was composed by the band's members in a collaboration with Jolley & Swain. The song has appeared on their second album titled In the Heat of the Night. "Music and Lights" became a hit that reached number five on the UK singles chart in 1982. It also reached number one in France and Italy.

== Track listing ==
7" single

1. "Music and Lights" – 3:46
2. "Music and Lights" (Instrumental) – 3:15

12" single

1. "Music and Lights" – 5:22
2. "Music and Lights" (Instrumental) – 4:10

== Chart performance ==
=== Weekly charts ===
Chart (1982)	Peak position
Belgium (Ultratop 50 Flanders)	10
Belgium (VRT Top 30 Flanders)	16
France (IFOP)	1
Ireland (IRMA)	5
Italy (FIMI)	1
Netherlands (Dutch Top 40)	12
Netherlands (Single Top 100)	16
Norway (VG-lista)	9
Spain (AFYVE)	2
Sweden (Sverigetopplistan)	12
Switzerland (Schweizer Hitparade)	9
UK Singles (Official Charts)	5
US Billboard Hot Black Singles	52
West Germany (GfK)	18

=== Year-end charts ===
Chart (1982)	Position
Belgium (Ultratop 50 Flanders)	95
France (IFOP)	15
Italy (FIMI)	17

=== Certifications and sales ===
Region	Certification	Certified units/sales
France (SNEP)	Gold	500,000^{*}
United Kingdom (BPI)	Gold	500,000^{^}
^{*} Sales figures based on certification alone.^{^} Shipments figures based on certification alone.

== See also ==
- List of number-one hits of 1982 (Italy)
- List of number-one singles of 1982 (France)
