= Instinctual (song) =

Single by Imagination
- B-side: "Touch (Part Two)"
- Released: 29 December 1987
- Recorded: 1987
- Genre: Post-disco, Funk
- Length: 3:50 (7" version); 5:51 (12" version)
- Label: RCA Records
- Songwriters: Arthur Baker; Paul Gurvitz
- Producer: Arthur Baker

Imagination singles chronology
| "I Know What Love Is" (1987) | "Instinctual (song)" (1987) | "Hold Me in Your Arms" (1988) |

Instinctual is a 1987 single by British dance trio Imagination. The single went to number one on the dance charts for one week and was the most successful of six entries on the chart. "Instinctual" charted at number sixty-two on the UK chart; however, unlike previous chart entries by Imagination, the single did not place on the soul singles chart.

== Chart performance ==
| Chart (1988) | Peak position |
|---|---|
| U.K. | 62 |
| U.S. Dance | 1 |
