= Chagrin d'amour =

1980s French pop duo

Chagrin d'amour (French pronunciation: [ʃaɡʁɛ̃ damuʁ]) was a French pop duo formed 1981 in Paris and often cited as the ones who recorded the first French hip hop album. It is best known for its 1981 single "Chacun fait (c'qui lui plait)".

== History ==
In 1981 Grégory Ken (Jean-Pierre Trochu) and Valli Kligerman released "Chacun fait (c'qui lui plait)", a single in French with influences from rap music. The single gained instant success in the country; it sold over 3 million copies. In 1982 their debut album Chagrin d'amour which featured the hit single was released. Chagrin d'amour's songs with simple rhymes and rap techniques caused many amateur music artists to become interested in the emerging hip hop style. Following the release of their second album Mon bob et moi in 1984 the duo split.
