= With Me (Destiny's Child song) =

- European maxi CD and UK CD1 singles cover

Single by Destiny's Child featuring Jermaine Dupri and Master P

from the album Destiny's Child
- B-side: "Second Nature"
- Released: April 20, 1998
- Recorded: Fall 1997
- Studio: Krosswire (Atlanta)
- Genre: R&B
- Length: 3:26 (Part 1); 4:07 (Part 2)
- Label: Columbia
- Songwriters: Jermaine Dupri; Percy Miller; Manuel Seal Jr.; Beyoncé Knowles (Note: Beyoncé co-wrote only Part 2.); LeToya Luckett (Note: LeToya Luckett co-wrote only Part 2.); LaTavia Roberson (Note: LaTavia Roberson co-wrote only Part 2.); Kelly Rowland (Note: Kelly Rowland co-wrote only Part 2.)
- Producers: Jermaine Dupri; Manuel Seal Jr.

Destiny's Child singles chronology
"Just Be Straight with Me" (1998)	"With Me" (1998)	"Get on the Bus" (1998)

Jermaine Dupri singles chronology
"The Party Continues" (1998)	"With Me" (1998)	"Money Ain't a Thang" (1998)

Master P singles chronology
"Let's Ride" (1998)	"With Me" (1998)	"I'm a Soulja" (1998)

Music video
- "With Me" on YouTube

"With Me" is a song recorded by American group Destiny's Child for their eponymous debut studio album (1998). The song was produced by Jermaine Dupri and Manuel Seal Jr., and contains elements of Master P's song "Freak Hoes". According to the group, "With Me" was written as an answer song to Usher's "You Make Me Wanna...".

"With Me" was released on April 20, 1998, as the second and final single from Destiny's Child by Columbia Records. Critically acclaimed, it was a moderate commercial success, peaking at number 19 on the UK Singles Chart.

== Music video ==
The accompanying music video for "With Me" was directed by Darren Grant, who directed Destiny's Child's previous two music videos for "No, No, No", and used the song's Part 1. The group's members appear in four different settings: Beyoncé appears as a mermaid in a fish bowl castle, LaTavia Roberson appears as a genie in an orange-colored room, Kelly Rowland is a giantess in a city nightclub, and LeToya Luckett is a "spider-woman" climbing a web made of metal chains in a purple background. The members appear together in gray outfits in one scene and in red dresses in a dark room covered with eyes. Jermaine Dupri also appears, watching the women in a slideshow. Beyoncé's younger sister Solange makes a cameo as well.

== Commercial performance ==
In the United States, "With Me" was ineligible to enter the Billboard Hot 100 and Hot R&B/Hip-Hop Songs due to its airplay-only release, as Billboard's rules at the time allowed only commercially available singles to chart. Consequently, "With Me" managed to enter only the R&B/Hip-Hop Airplay and Rhythmic charts, peaking at numbers 36 and 35, respectively.

"With Me" entered the UK Singles Chart on July 11, 1998, at number 19, which became its peak. In the Netherlands, the song peaked at number 83 on the Dutch Single Top 100, spending three weeks on the chart.

== Track listings and formats ==
European maxi and UK CD1 singles

1. "With Me" (Part 1) (featuring JD) – 3:27
2. "With Me" (Part 2) (featuring Master P) – 4:14
3. "With Me" (Part 1) (instrumental) – 3:28
4. "Second Nature" – 5:09

UK CD2 single

1. "With Me" (Full Crew Radio Version) – 3:42
2. "With Me" (Full Crew Revocaled Radio Version) – 3:55
3. "With Me" (Full Crew Main Mix W/Rap) – 4:03
4. "With Me" (Full Crew Main Mix No Rap) – 4:03

US promotional CD single

1. "With Me" (Part 2) (radio edit) (featuring Master P) – 3:36
2. "With Me" (Part 2) (no rap) (featuring Master P) – 2:39
3. "With Me" (Part 1) (album version) (featuring JD) – 3:27
4. "With Me" (Part 3) (UK mix radio edit) (featuring Full Crew) – 3:53
5. "With Me" (Part 4) (UK mix with rap) (featuring Full Crew) – 4:03
6. "With Me" (Part 2) (instrumental) – 4:14
7. "With Me" (Part 4) (instrumental) – 4:03
8. "With Me" (Part 2) (Callout Hook #1) – 0:10
9. "With Me" (Part 2) (Callout Hook #2) – 0:05
10. "With Me" (Part 3) (Callout Hook #1) – 0:10
11. "With Me" (Part 3) (Callout Hook #2) – 0:05

== Charts ==
=== Weekly charts ===
Weekly chart performance for "With Me"
Chart (1998)	Peak position
Canada Dance (RPM)	3
Canada Urban (RPM) With Master P	3
Europe (European Hot 100 Singles)	92
Netherlands (Dutch Top 40 Tipparade)	13
Netherlands (Single Top 100)	87
Scottish Singles Sales (Official Charts)	72
UK Singles (Official Charts)	19
UK Hip Hop/R&B (Official Charts)	4
US R&B/Hip-Hop Airplay (Billboard) Featuring JD	36
US Rhythmic Airplay (Billboard) Featuring JD	35

=== Year-end charts ===
Year end chart performance for "With Me"
Chart (1998)	Position
UK Urban (Music Week)	16

== Release history ==
Release dates and formats for "With Me"
Region	Date	Format(s)	Label(s)	Ref.
United States	April 20, 1998	Urban contemporary radio	Columbia	
United Kingdom	June 29, 1998	Cassette; two maxi CDs	Columbia	
