= Leee John =

British musician, singer, and actor (born 1957)

- John performing in Olonne-sur-Mer

Background information
- Born: Leslie McGregor John; 23 June 1957 (age 69); Hackney, London, England
- Genres: R&B; soul; Britfunk; funk; post-disco; pop; house music
- Occupations: Singer; songwriter; actor
- Instrument: Vocals
- Years active: 1970s–present
- Labels: R&B; RCA
- Member of: Imagination feat. Leee John
- Formerly of: Fizzz ⸱ Imagination
- Website: leeejohn.com

Leslie McGregor "Leee" John (born 23 June 1957) is an English musician, singer and actor of St Lucian descent. He rose to fame as the lead singer of the soul band Imagination, which had three UK top 10 hits in the early 1980s. He is known for his falsetto voice and his flamboyant sense of fashion and outfits.

== Early life and beginnings ==
John was born in Hackney, London, and educated in New York City, later studying drama at the Anna Scher Theatre School.

His mother is Jessie Stevens MBE SLPM (born 1927), who moved with her then husband from St. Lucia to Britain in 1955. She is the first black woman to have worked at Companies House. Part of the Windrush Generation, she is a well-known figure in the St Lucian community and she received a MBE from Queen Elizabeth in 1982, after having worked in the Haringey Police Liaison Group, which helped facilitate relations between the police and the community.

John, then a young child, moved to New York City with his father, after his parents’ divorce. Despite signing, aged 10 or 11, to a record label and notably working as a background singer for The Delfonics, the Chairmen of the Board, The Velvelettes and The Elgins, he moved back as a teenager to England to live with his mother. His father did not really support his musical ambitions and rather wanted John to continue studying. While in college, he recorded an album for EMI with family friend Russel Fraser (under the name Russ and Leee), but only had very little success.

== Career ==
John was still working as a backing singer when he met Ashley Ingram (born 27 November 1960, Northampton, England) a guitarist/bassist. They formed a songwriting partnership, working in a short-lived band called Fizzz. Together with Ingram and Errol Kennedy (born 9 June 1953, Montego Bay, Jamaica) they formed Imagination, a three-piece soul music band, in the early 1980s. The band was named after Imagine, the John Lennon song; Lennon had died a year earlier. The band worked with Grammy-winning record producer Trevor Horn, which had them discovered by the production duo Jolley & Swain. The duo produced their hit "Body Talk" reached number 4 in the UK Singles Chart in May 1981. Their biggest hit, "Just an Illusion", peaked at number 2 in March 1982. The trio frequently appeared on Top of the Pops and other pop music programmes. Imagination released 7 albums in total, the most famous being first three: Body Talk (1981), In the Heat of the Night (1982), and Scandalous (1983).

Despite not being an actor, John made a guest appearance in the Doctor Who story Enlightenment in 1983, playing the character Mansell; he replaced actor David Rhule, who had dropped out at short notice because of an industrial strike at the BBC after the rehearsals had begun. The group's fortunes waned but they continued to perform, tour and record until the early 1990s. John went back to acting, but in 2003 resurfaced in the reality television show Reborn in the USA, alongside other singers such as Elkie Brooks and Tony Hadley.

He released a number of dance singles in the late 1990s and early 2000s, including the UK garage and house tracks "Your Mind, Your Body, Your Soul" on Locked On Records and "U Turn Me" with Ten City vocalist Byron Stingily (2000). Under the artist name Johnny X, he also co-wrote and performed vocals on "Call on Me" which was released on Higher State. In 2005, John released a jazz album, Feel My Soul, on Candid Records, featuring a mixture of jazz standards and original compositions. Since the album's release, John has been touring the UK and Europe with his jazz quartet, as well as performing with Imagination.

John is an ambassador for SOS Children's Villages, an international orphan charity providing homes and mothers for orphaned and abandoned children. He supports the charity's annual World Orphan Week campaign, which takes place each February. In 2012, he performed at the Leicester Square Theatre. Special guests included Mike Lindup from Level 42.

In 2020, John appeared on the track "The Lost Chord" by Gorillaz as part of its Song Machine project, which was followed by the album Song Machine, Season One: Strange Timez.

In 2023, Leee John and his mother Jessie Stephens were invited, alongside celebrities such as Raymond Blanc and Jay Blades, to King Charles's 75th birthday celebration at Highgrove House, in Gloucestershire.

== In popular culture ==
John was portrayed by Tyrone Huntley in the 2020 Small Axe film Red, White and Blue, which depicted his friendship with Leroy Logan.

== Discography ==
- Feel My Soul (2005)
- Live in Paris at the New Morning (2007)
- The Voice of Illusion Vol. 1 (2008)
- Now Is the Time (2008)
- Intimate Glow, with Bill Sharpe (2024)
- Jazzz (2026)

== Bibliography ==
- Howe, David J.; Walker, Stephen James (1995). Doctor Who: The Handbook. Vol. The Fifth Doctor. Doctor Who Books. ISBN 978-0-426-20458-9.
