= Just an Illusion =

1982 song by Imagination

Single by Imagination

from the album In the Heat of the Night
- Released: 19 February 1982
- Genre: Post-disco; new wave; R&B; funk
- Length: 8:12 (12" version); 6:27 (album version); 3:55 (single version)
- Label: R&B; MCA (US)
- Songwriters: Steve Jolley; Tony Swain; Ashley Ingram; Leee John
- Producers: Jolley & Swain

Imagination singles chronology
"Flashback" (1981)	"Just an Illusion" (1982)	"Music and Lights" (1982)

Audio video
- "Just an Illusion" on YouTube

"Just an Illusion" is a song by the British trio Imagination. Co-written by Steve Jolley, Tony Swain, Ashley Ingram and Leee John, the song was a major European hit, peaking at number 2 in the group's native UK. In the United States, "Just an Illusion" went to number 27 on the Hot R&B/Hip-Hop Songs. The song also peaked at number 15 on the dance charts.

== Track listing ==
7" single

1. "Just an Illusion" – 3:55
2. "Just an Illusion" (Instrumental) – 3:40

== Chart performance ==
=== Weekly charts ===
Chart (1982)	Peak position
Australian (Kent Music Report)	64
Austria (Ö3 Austria Top 40)	6
Belgium (Ultratop 50 Flanders)	9
France (IFOP)	3
Ireland (IRMA)	8
Italy (FIMI)	2
Netherlands (Dutch Top 40)	8
Netherlands (Single Top 100)	12
Norway (VG-lista)	5
South Africa (Springbok Radio)	3
Spain (AFYVE)	1
Sweden (Sverigetopplistan)	3
Switzerland (Schweizer Hitparade)	2
UK Singles (Official Charts)	2
US Billboard Hot Black Singles	27
US Billboard Hot Dance Club Play	15
West Germany (GfK)	7

=== Year-end charts ===
Chart (1982)	Position
Belgium (Ultratop 50 Flanders)	65
France (IFOP)	7
Netherlands (Dutch Top 40)	87
Netherlands (Single Top 100)	83
South Africa (Springbok Radio)	9
UK (OCC)	25

=== Certifications and sales ===
Region	Certification	Certified units/sales
France (SNEP)	Gold	500,000^{*}
United Kingdom (BPI)	Silver	250,000^{^}
^{*} Sales figures based on certification alone.^{^} Shipments figures based on certification alone.

== Samples ==
"Get Your Number", co-written by Mariah Carey, Jermaine Dupri, Johntá Austin, and Bryan-Michael Cox and recorded by Carey on her album The Emancipation of Mimi (2005), samples the song.

On the live telecasts of the PBA Tour on USA Network from 1982 to 1984, the instrumental track was used as background music during the in-between round segments.

== See also ==
- List of number-one singles of 1982 (Spain)
