= Imagination (band) =

English soul and funk band

- Origin: London, England
- Genres: Post-disco; funk; soul
- Years active: 1981–1992
- Labels: R&B; RCA
- Past members: Leee John; Ashley Ingram; Errol Kennedy
- Website: imaginationband.com

Imagination were an English trio, who came to prominence in the early 1980s. They had hits in 28 countries, earning four platinum discs, nine gold discs, and more than a dozen silver discs around the world between 1981 and 1983.

== History ==
=== Background ===
Singer/keyboardist Leee John (born 23 June 1957, Hackney, London) was working as a backing vocalist for the Delfonics, Chairmen of the Board, the Velvelettes and the Elgins when he met Ashley Ingram, a guitarist/bassist (born 27 November 1960, Northampton). John and Ingram formed a songwriting partnership, resolving to start their own "slinky, sexy, and erotic" group, working in a short-lived band called Fizzz. While they were auditioning for another short-lived band, Midnight Express, they met drummer Errol Kennedy (born 9 June 1953, Montego Bay, Jamaica), who at a very young age had learned to drum in the Boys' Brigade and Air Training Corps. Kennedy was a member of the London-based soul-funk band TFB (Typical Funk Band), later known as Central Line, prior to co-founding Midnight Express.

=== Career ===
Formed in early 1981, the trio took a demo tape of a track called "Body Talk" to producers Jolley & Swain. It was released as a single in April 1981 under the group name "Imagination", which the group chose as a tribute to John Lennon. The track reached number 4 in the UK Singles Chart in July 1981, selling 250,000 copies in the UK and spending 18 weeks in the Top 50. They had two more hit singles that year, "In and Out of Love" (September 1981) and "Flashback" (November 1981), both of which peaked at number 16, all from their debut album, also called Body Talk.

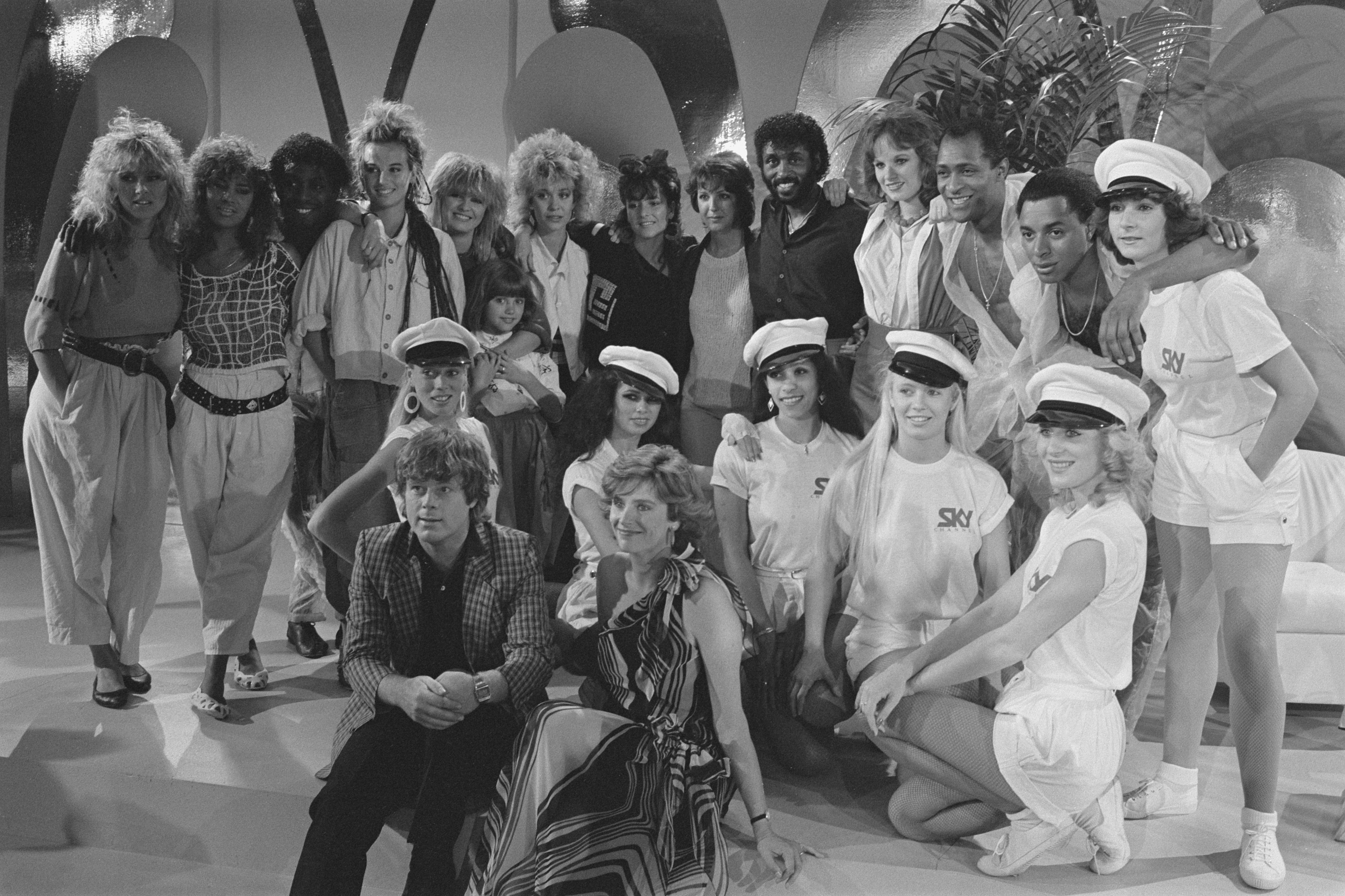
Imagination & others (1984)

Their biggest hit, "Just an Illusion", peaked at number two in March 1982 ("Just an Illusion" would later be used as the end title song to the 1986 film, F/X), followed by "Music and Lights" (number five in June), "In the Heat of the Night" (number 22 in September, also the name of their second album), and "Changes" (number 31 in December). This was accompanied by a sell-out concert tour of Europe, with 22 dates in the UK. The trio frequently appeared on BBC Television's Top of the Pops, and other pop music television programmes, with a distinctive exotic style, reminiscent of Roman senators, harem orderlies and slaves. John made a guest appearance on Doctor Who in 1983. They were also known for their esoteric album sleeve notes.

Following this, the success of the group in the UK waned, but they continued to perform, tour and record with nine further singles charting in the UK top 100 between 1984 and 1989, though apart from Thank You My Love none of these broke into the top 40 . In 1987, they were signed to RCA Records, but by the end of that year Ingram and Kennedy left the band. John with new members, Nat Augustin and Peter Royer, continued and recorded a last album, The Fascination of the Physical, in 1992 which produced no charting singles. The band split up the same year.

John went back to acting, but re-surfaced as a singer in the reality television show Reborn in the USA. Ingram also enjoyed success as a songwriter for Des'ree.

== Discography ==
- Body Talk (1981)
- In the Heat of the Night (1982)
- Scandalous (US: New Dimension) (1983)
- Trilogy (1986)
- Closer (1987)
- The Fascination of the Physical (1992)
- Retropia (2016)

== See also ==
- List of Billboard number-one dance hits
- List of artists who reached number one on the U.S. dance chart
