= Jolley & Swain =

UK music duo

- Born: Steven Nicholas Jolley; Tony Swain
- Origin: United Kingdom
- Genres: Pop; rock
- Occupations: Songwriters; producers

Steven Nicholas Jolley (born April 1950) and Tony Swain (born 20 January 1952, London, England) were a successful songwriting and record production duo in the United Kingdom in the early to mid-1980s, producing some of the top artists and songs of the era.

== Career ==
The pair met in 1975 when Swain was working as a television cameraman on The Muppet Show, where Jolley was sound technician and sometimes boom operator. They formed the band Chaser in 1975 with Richard Palmer (rhythm guitar and percussion), Nick Adams (lead guitar), Ray Bailey (bass) and Brian Grant (drums). Chaser released the single "Red Rum" (1975), written by Jolley, Palmer and Swain, on Polydor as a tribute to the famous racehorse. Swain left to pursue a career as a songwriter/record producer while Jolley released a single and an album with the English Boys in 1980.

Their first known collaborative work was released by the Irish singer Joe Dolan on his 1980 album Turn Out the Light, which featured four Jolley/Swain compositions. In 1981, they reunited to produce the debut single "Body Talk" for Imagination. They produced four albums for the group and eight hit singles including "Just an Illusion" which peaked at number two in the UK Singles Chart and "Music and Lights" which reached number one in both Italy and France, number 2 in Spain, 5 in the UK, as well as charting highly in several other countries. At the same time they produced albums and singles for Bananarama, including "Cruel Summer".

They subsequently produced the album True for Spandau Ballet, with the title track reaching number one in the UK in 1983, and its follow-up Parade. They also produced the album Alf for Alison Moyet on which the pair shared songwriting and musician credits for many of the tracks, and were nominated for a BRIT Award for the song, "Love Resurrection". Most of their recordings and productions were done at Red Bus Studios in London.

Swain and Jolley also produced Kevin Kitchen for China Records. The album Split Personality, and single "Put My Arms Around You", were both released in 1985. The single reached No. 64 in the UK Singles Chart.

In 1985, they released their own instrumental album, Backtrackin', from which "Soul Street" was released as single.

They subsequently worked with Diana Ross, Tom Robinson, Errol Brown and Wang Chung, as well as Louise Goffin (daughter of Carole King and Gerry Goffin). They worked in London and LA with Princess Stephanie of Monaco.

== Later years ==
After splitting up, Swain went on to produce Kim Wilde's million-selling Close album. Jolley set up a record label and production company, releasing uptempo club version of Aznavour's What Makes A Man and other records, under the group name Marseilles. He also went on to co-produce and write tracks for Bananarama's Pop Life album.

Swain was head A&R Consultant for Universal Records International. In 2001, Jolley was convicted of sexual offences involving minors and jailed for 18 months.
