= R&B Records =

- Parent company: PRT Records
- Founded: 1980
- Founder: Morgan Khan
- Defunct: 1987
- Genre: British soul, post-disco
- Country of origin: UK

R&B Records was a British record label. It was most famous for being the label of the band Imagination. It closed down in 1987 when Imagination signed with RCA Records.
