= Bow Wow discography =

Hip hop recording artist discography

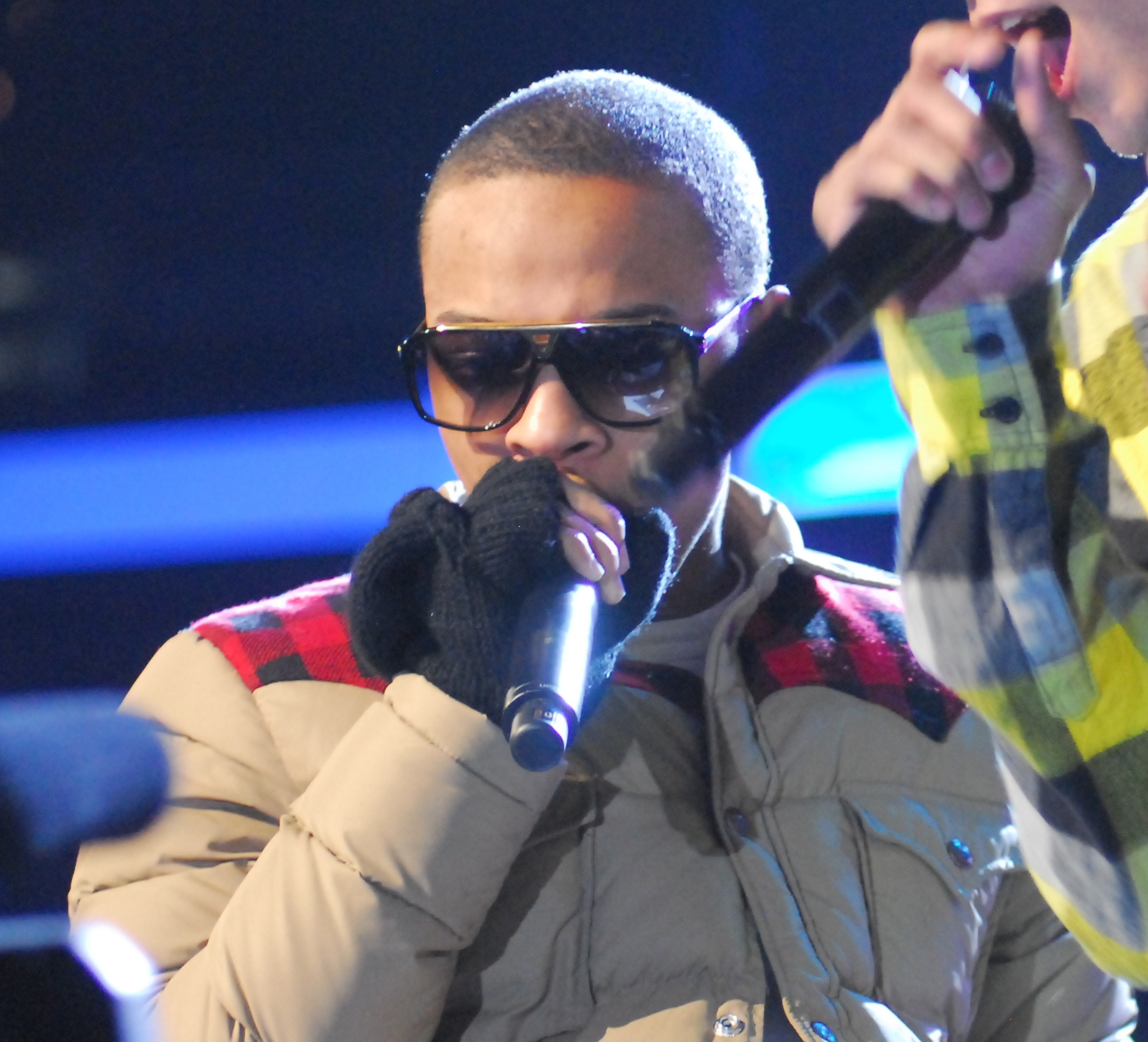
- Bow Wow performing in 2009
- Studio albums: 7
- Singles: 50
- Music videos: 53
- Mixtapes: 9

American rapper Bow Wow has released seven studio albums, fifty singles, fifty-one music videos, and eight mixtapes. In his career, he has had a total of twelve top 40 singles (three of which were top ten hits) on the US Billboard Hot 100 chart. He has sold over 10 million copies and 14 million digital assets worldwide.

== Studio albums ==
List of albums, with selected chart positions, sales figures and certifications
Title	Album details	Peak chart positions										Sales	Certifications
Title	Album details	US	US R&B	US Rap	AUS	FRA	GER	NLD	NZ	SWI	UK	Sales	Certifications
Beware of Dog	Released: September 26, 2000; Label: So So Def, Columbia; Formats: CD, CS, LP, digital download	8	3	—	36	41	61	66	21	34	79	US: 2,700,000	RIAA: 2× Platinum; MC: Platinum; RMNZ: Gold
Doggy Bag	Released: December 18, 2001; Label: So So Def, Columbia; Formats: CD, CS, digital download	11	2	—	—	—	—	—	—	—	—	US: 1,100,000	RIAA: Platinum
Unleashed	Released: August 19, 2003; Label: So So Def, Sony Music, Columbia; Formats: CD, CS, digital download	3	3	—	—	—	—	—	—	—	—	US: 774,000	RIAA: Gold
Wanted	Released: July 12, 2005; Label: Columbia, Sony Music; Formats: CD, LP, digital download	3	3	1	80	107	—	—	—	—	164	US: 956,000	RIAA: Platinum
The Price of Fame	Released: December 19, 2006; Label: LBW Entertainment, Columbia, Sony Music; Formats: CD, digital download	6	2	2	—	—	—	—	—	—	—		RIAA: Gold
New Jack City II	Released: March 31, 2009; Label: LBW Entertainment, Columbia, Sony Music; Formats: CD, digital download	16	5	2	—	—	—	—	—	—	—	US: 31,000	
"—" denotes a recording that did not chart or was not released in territory.

=== Collaborative albums ===
List of albums, with selected chart positions and certifications
Title	Album details	Peak chart positions			Certifications
Title	Album details	US	US R&B	US Rap	Certifications
Face Off (with Omarion)	Released: December 11, 2007; Label: Columbia, RCA, Sony BMG; Formats: CD, digital download	11	1	1	RIAA: Gold

== Mixtapes ==
List of mixtapes, with year released
Title	Album details
Half Man, Half Dog Vol. 1	Released: November 22, 2008; Label: Self-released; Format: Digital download
Half Man, Half Dog Vol. 2	Released: February 10, 2009; Label: Self-released; Format: Digital download
The Green Light	Released: August 24, 2009; Label: Self-released; Format: Digital download
Greenlight 2	Released: January 3, 2010; Label: Self-released; Format: Digital download
Greenlight 3	Released: October 3, 2010; Label: Self-released; Format: Digital download
Greenlight 4	Released: August 19, 2011; Label: Self-released; Format: Digital download
I'm Better Than You	Released: September 27, 2011; Label: Cash Money; Format: Digital download
Greenlight 5	Released: March 9, 2013; Label: Cash Money; Format: Digital download
Greenlight 6	Released: May 14, 2019; Label: LBW Entertainment, Death Row, Bad Boy; Format: Digital download

== Singles ==
=== As lead artist ===
List of singles as lead artist, with selected chart positions and certifications, showing year released and album name
Title	Year	Peak chart positions										Certifications	Album
Title	Year	US	US R&B	US Rap	AUS	FRA	GER	NLD	NZ	SWI	UK	Certifications	Album
"Bounce with Me" (featuring Xscape)	2000	20	1	1	48	—	—	—	—	—	—		Beware of Dog
"Bow Wow (That's My Name)" (featuring Snoop Dogg)	2000	21	9	1	6	2	9	2	17	4	6	ARIA: Platinum; SNEP: Gold	Beware of Dog
"Hardball" (with Sammie, Lil Zane and Lil Wayne)	2001	—	68	—	—	—	—	—	—	—	—		Hardball
"Puppy Love" (featuring Jagged Edge)	2001	75	27	—	—	84	89	50	—	65	—		Beware of Dog
"Ghetto Girls"	2001	91	40	14	—	—	—	—	—	—	—		Beware of Dog
"Thank You" (featuring Jagged Edge, Jermaine Dupri and Fundisha)	2001	93	45	21	—	—	—	—	—	—	—		Doggy Bag
"Take Ya Home"	2001	72	21	—	90	—	—	—	—	—	—		Doggy Bag
"Basketball" (featuring Jermaine Dupri, Fabolous and Fundisha)	2002	—	44	25	—	—	81	—	—	53	—		Like Mike soundtrack
"Let's Get Down" (featuring Birdman)	2003	14	12	6	50	—	—	97	—	—	93		Unleashed
"My Baby" (featuring Jagged Edge)	2003	42	17	15	—	—	—	—	—	—	—		Unleashed
"Let Me Hold You" (featuring Omarion)	2005	4	2	1	14	40	35	—	8	—	27	RIAA: Platinum; BPI: Silver; RMNZ: 2× Platinum	Wanted
"Like You" (featuring Ciara)	2005	3	1	1	16	—	39	—	—	72	17	RIAA: Platinum; BPI: Silver; RMNZ: 2× Platinum	Wanted
"Fresh Azimiz" (featuring J-Kwon and Jermaine Dupri)	2005	23	13	6	—	—	—	—	—	—	—	RIAA: Gold	Wanted
"Shortie Like Mine" (featuring Chris Brown and Johntá Austin)	2006	9	2	1	36	—	—	—	2	—	—	RIAA: Platinum; RMNZ: 2× Platinum	The Price of Fame
"Outta My System" (featuring T-Pain and Johntá Austin)	2007	22	12	2	—	—	—	—	7	—	—	RIAA: Platinum; RMNZ: Platinum	The Price of Fame
"I'm a Flirt" (featuring R. Kelly)	2007	12	2	1	—	—	—	—	—	—	—	RIAA: Platinum	The Price of Fame
"Girlfriend" (with Omarion)	2007	33	20	6	—	—	—	—	7	—	182	RMNZ: Gold	Face Off
"Hey Baby (Jump Off)" (with Omarion)	2007	— (Note: "Hey Baby (Jump Off)" did not enter the Billboard Hot 100, but peaked at number two on the Bubbling Under Hot 100 Singles chart.)	—	24	—	—	—	—	25	—	—		Face Off
"Marco Polo" (featuring Soulja Boy)	2008	66	28	22	—	—	—	—	—	—	—		Non-album singles
"Big Girls" (featuring Yung Joc)	2008	—	—	—	—	—	—	—	—	—	—		Non-album singles
"Roc the Mic" (featuring Jermaine Dupri)	2009	—	—	—	—	—	—	—	—	—	—		New Jack City II
"You Can Get It All" (featuring Johntá Austin)	2009	55	30	8	—	—	—	—	17	—	—	RMNZ: Gold	New Jack City II
"Ain't Thinkin' 'Bout You" (featuring Chris Brown)	2010	— (Note: "Ain't Thinkin' 'Bout You" did not enter the Billboard Hot 100, but peaked at number eleven on the Bubbling Under Hot 100 Singles chart.)	51	23	—	—	—	—	—	—	—	RMNZ: Gold	Non-album singles
"Sweat" (featuring Lil Wayne)	2011	48	— (Note: "Sweat" did not enter the Hot R&B/Hip-Hop Songs chart, but peaked at number 4 on the Bubbling Under R&B/Hip-Hop Singles chart.)	—	—	—	—	—	—	—	—		Non-album singles
"We in da Club"	2012	—	— (Note: "We in da Club" did not enter the Hot R&B/Hip-Hop Songs chart, but peaked at number 12 on the Bubbling Under R&B/Hip-Hop Singles chart.)	—	—	—	—	—	—	—	—		Greenlight 5
"Better" (featuring T-Pain)	2012	—	—	—	—	—	—	—	—	—	—		Non-album singles
"Made U"	2018	—	—	—	—	—	—	—	—	—	—		Non-album singles
"Yeaahh"	2018	—	—	—	—	—	—	—	—	—	—		Non-album singles
"Woah"	2018	—	—	—	—	—	—	—	—	—	—		Non-album singles
"Pussy Talk"	2018	—	—	—	—	—	—	—	—	—	—		Non-album singles
"Broken Heart"	2018	—	—	—	—	—	—	—	—	—	—		Non-album singles
"Met On Collins (DM)"	2020	—	—	—	—	—	—	—	—	—	—		Non-album singles
"My Pain"	2021	—	—	—	—	—	—	—	—	—	—		Non-album singles
"Use Me" (featuring Chris Brown)	2025	—	—	—	—	—	—	—	—	—	—		Non-album singles
"—" denotes a recording that did not chart or was not released in territory.

=== As featured artist ===
List of singles as featured artist, with selected chart positions and certifications, showing year released and album name
Title	Year	Peak chart positions										Certifications	Album
Title	Year	US	US R&B	US Rap	AUS	GER	IRL	NLD	NZ	SWI	UK	Certifications	Album
"Baby It's You" (JoJo featuring Bow Wow)	2004	22	—	—	16	15	13	36	3	14	8	RIAA: Gold; ARIA: Gold	JoJo
"I Think They Like Me" (Dem Franchize Boyz featuring Jermaine Dupri, Da Brat and Bow Wow)	2005	15	1	1	—	—	—	—	27	—	66	RIAA: Gold	On Top of Our Game
"Side 2 Side" (Three 6 Mafia featuring Bow Wow and Project Pat)	2006	—	63	—	—	—	—	—	—	—	—		Most Known Unknown
"Lil' L.O.V.E." (Bone Thugs-n-Harmony featuring Mariah Carey and Bow Wow)	2007	— (Note: "Lil' L.O.V.E." did not enter the Billboard Hot 100, but peaked at number 17 on the Bubbling Under Hot 100 Singles chart.)	66	24	—	—	—	—	6	—	—		Strength & Loyalty
"Easy" (Paula DeAnda featuring Bow Wow)	2007	64	—	—	—	—	—	—	—	—	—		Paula DeAnda
"Hydrolics" (B5 featuring Bow Wow)	2007	—	36	—	—	—	—	—	—	—	—		Don't Talk, Just Listen
"I'm Grown" (Tiffany Evans featuring Bow Wow)	2008	—	—	—	—	—	—	—	—	—	—		Tiffany Evans
"All We Know" (DJ Absolut featuring Ace Hood, Ray J, Swizz Beatz, Bow Wow and Fat Joe)	2013	—	—	—	—	—	—	—	—	—	—		Non-album singles
"EX" (Omarion featuring Bow Wow and Soulja Boy)	2021	—	—	—	—	—	—	—	—	—	—		Non-album singles
"—" denotes a recording that did not chart or was not released in that territory.

=== Promotional singles ===
List of promotional singles, with selected chart positions, showing year released and album name
Title	Year	Peak chart positions		Album
Title	Year	US	US R&B	Album
"Dance with Us" (P. Diddy and Brandy featuring Bow Wow)	2002	—	—	The Wild Thornberrys Movie soundtrack
"Don't Know About That" (featuring Young Capone and Cocaine J)	2007	—	— (Note: "Don't Know About That" did not enter the Hot R&B/Hip-Hop Songs chart, but peaked at number fifteen on the Bubbling Under R&B/Hip-Hop Singles chart.)	The Price of Fame
"Big Girls"	2008	—	—	New Jack City II
"For My Hood" (featuring Sean Kingston)	2010	— (Note: "For My Hood" did not enter the Billboard Hot 100, but peaked at number fifteen on the Bubbling Under Hot 100 Singles chart.)	— (Note: "For My Hood" did not enter the Hot R&B/Hip-Hop Songs chart, but peaked at number nine on the Bubbling Under R&B/Hip-Hop Singles chart.)	Lottery Ticket soundtrack
"Little Secret" (Lil Twist featuring Bow Wow)	2010	—	—	Non-album singles
"WYA" (with Jermaine Dupri)	2015	—	—	Non-album singles
"Too Real" (with DJ Willi)	2015	—	—	Non-album singles
"Drunk Off Ciroc"	2019	—	—	Non-album singles
"—" denotes a recording that did not chart.

== Other charted and certified songs ==
List of songs, with selected chart positions and certifications, showing year released and album name
Title	Year	Peak chart positions	Certifications	Album
Title	Year	US R&B	Certifications	Album
"Playin' the Game"	2002	—	RMNZ: Gold	Like Mike
"He Ain't Gotta Know" (with Omarion)	2007	— (Note: "He Ain't Gotta Know" did not enter the Hot R&B/Hip-Hop Songs chart, but peaked at number 23 on the Bubbling Under R&B/Hip-Hop Singles chart.)		Face Off
"Headboard Pt. 2" (Bertell featuring Bow Wow and T-Pain)	2011	— (Note: "Headboard Pt. 2" did not enter the Hot R&B/Hip-Hop Songs chart, but peaked at number 19 on the Bubbling Under R&B/Hip-Hop Singles chart.)		Non-album song
"—" denotes a recording that did not chart.

== Guest appearances ==
List of non-single songs with guest appearances, other performing artists, showing year released and album name
Title	Year	Other performer(s)	Album
"All I Want for Christmas Is You" (So So Def Remix)	2000	Mariah Carey, Jermaine Dupri	Greatest Hits
"Jumpin', Jumpin'" (So So Def Remix)	2000	Destiny's Child, Jermaine Dupri, Da Brat	This Is the Remix
"In My Dreams" (Remix)	2001	Dream	none
"Where the Party At" (So So Def Remix)	2001	Jagged Edge, Jermaine Dupri, Da Brat, R.O.C., Tigah	The Hits
"Irresistible" (So So Def Remix)	2001	Jessica Simpson, Jermaine Dupri	This Is the Remix
"Follow Me"	2004	none	Johnson Family Vacation
"Run It!" (Remix)	2005	Chris Brown, Jermaine Dupri	Chris Brown
"Pop, Lock & Drop It" (Remix)	2006	Huey, T-Pain	Notebook Paper
"Picture Perfect" (Remix)	2008	Chris Brown, Hurricane Chris	Exclusive: The Forever Edition
"So Much Swag"	2009	Ocean's 7	3000 & 9 Shit
"Teach Me How to Dougie" (Remix)	2010	Cali Swag District, Jermaine Dupri, Red Cafe, B.o.B	none
"Ain't Thinkin' 'Bout You"	2010	Chris Brown	Fan of a Fan
"Every Night"	2011	Layzie Bone, Larron Brant	The Meaning
"Loyalty" (Remix)	2011	Birdman, Tyga, Brisco, Mack Maine, Lil Twist, Cory Gunz	none
"I Got Her"	2011	Snoop Dogg, Kurupt	Throw Your Dubs Up
"Celebration" (Remix)	2013	Jermaine Dupri, Jagged Edge, Dondria, Da Brat, Fresco Kane	none
"All Js"	2013	Jadakiss, Styles P	none
"Tax It"	2013	Chevy Woods	Gangland 2
"I Can Change Your Life"	2013	Compton Menace	none
"Panties to the Side"	2013	French Montana, Tyga, Gudda Gudda	Rich Gang
"Μοving Her Mouth"	2018	T-Pain, MJG	Everything Must Go Vol. 2
