= Jermaine Dupri discography =

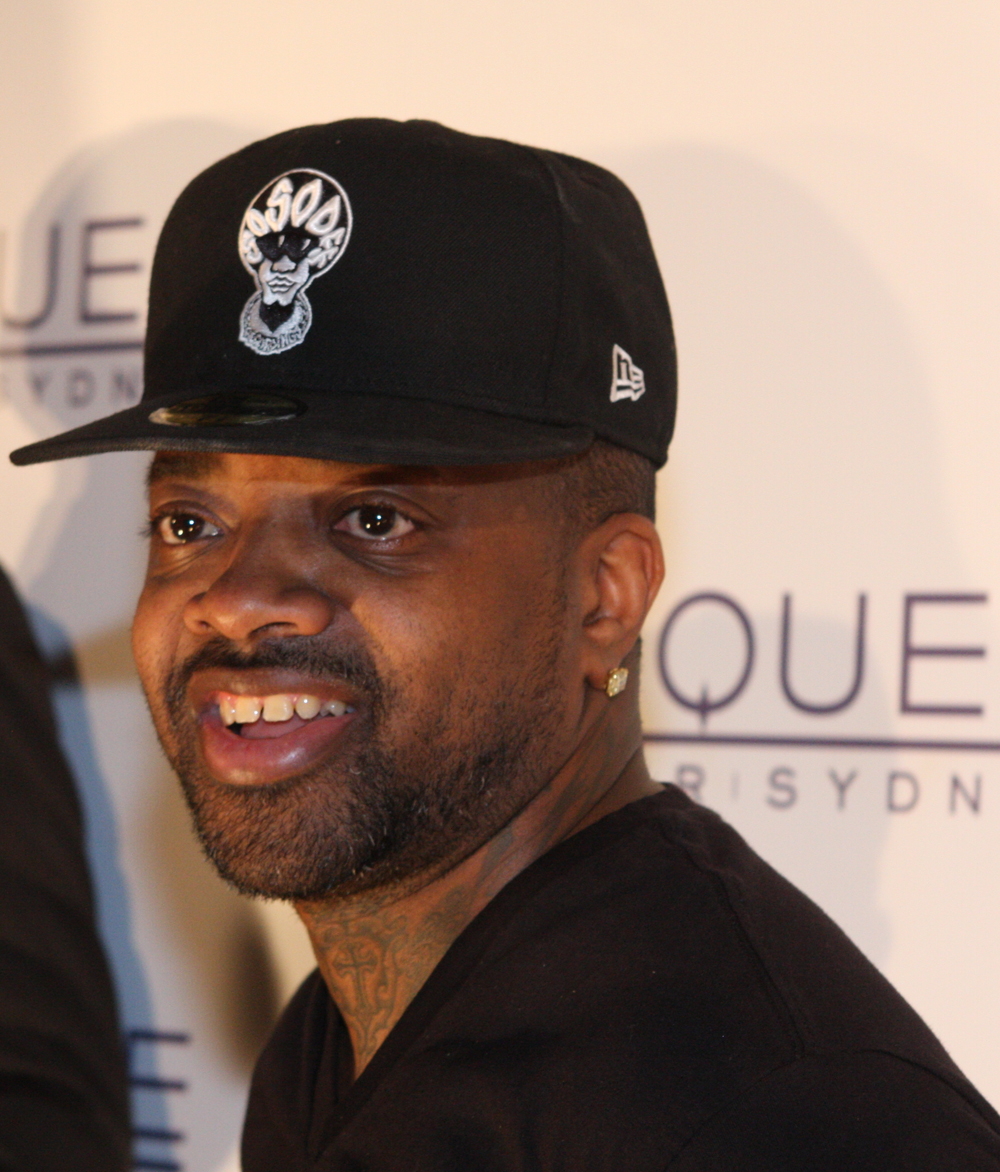
Dupri in 2012

This is the discography of record producer and rapper Jermaine Dupri. He has released two solo studio albums, and four compilation albums.

Alongside this, Dupri has 15 solo singles and 27 featured singles, with six and 13 of them charting on the Billboard Hot 100 respectively.

== Albums ==
=== Studio albums ===
List of albums, with selected chart positions and certifications
Title	Album details	Peak chart positions						Certifications
Title	Album details	US	US R&B	AUS	CAN	NLD	UK	Certifications
Life in 1472	Released: July 21, 1998; Label: So So Def, Columbia; Format: CD, LP, cassette, digital download	3	1	62	20	96	93	RIAA: Platinum; MC: Gold
Instructions	Released: October 30, 2001; Label: So So Def, Columbia; Format: CD, LP, cassette, digital download	15	3	—	—	—	119	
Magic City	Released: September 12, 2025; Label: So So Def Recordings/HYBE AMERICA Music							
"—" denotes a recording that did not chart or was not released in that territory.

=== Compilation albums ===
Year	Title
1998	12 Soulful Nights of Christmas: Released: December 15, 1998; Label: So So Def / Columbia
2005	Young, Fly & Flashy, Vol. 1: Released: July 19, 2005; Label: So So Def / Virgin
2007	Y'all Know What This Is... The Hits: Released: October 23, 2007; Label: So So Def / Island Urban Music
2018	Jermaine Dupri Presents... So So Def 25: Released: June 29, 2018; Label: So So Def / Columbia

== Singles ==
=== As lead artist ===
List of singles as lead artist, with selected chart positions, showing year charted and album name
Title	Year	Peak chart positions										Album
Title	Year	US	US R&B	US Rap	FIN	GER	NLD	NZ	SWE	SWI	UK	Album
"The Party Continues" (ft. Da Brat and Usher)	1998	29	14	6	—	—	—	—	—	—	—	Life in 1472
"Money Ain't a Thang" (ft. Jay-Z)	1998	52	10	28	—	—	—	—	—	—	—	Life in 1472
"Sweetheart" (with Mariah Carey)	1998	— (Note: "Sweetheart" did not enter the Billboard Hot 100, but peaked at number 25 on the Bubbling Under Hot 100 Singles chart.)	53	—	—	15	22	—	44	18	—	Life in 1472
"Going Home with Me" (ft. Keith Sweat and R.O.C.)	1998	—	57	—	—	—	—	—	—	—	—	Life in 1472
"I've Got to Have It" (ft. Nas and Monica)	2000	—	67	15	—	76	—	—	—	—	—	Big Momma's House: Soundtrack
"Ballin' Out of Control" (ft. Nate Dogg)	2001	95	42	14	—	—	—	—	—	—	—	Instructions
"Welcome to Atlanta" (with Ludacris)	2002	35	15	3	—	—	—	—	—	—	—	Instructions
"Gotta Getcha" (ft. Johnta Austin)	2005	60	31	15	—	—	—	—	—	—	54	Young, Fly & Flashy, Vol. 1
"I Think They Like Me" (with Dem Franchize Boyz, Da Brat and Bow Wow)	2005	15	1	1	27	—	—	5	—	—	—	Young, Fly & Flashy, Vol. 1
"WYA (Where You At?)" (ft. Bow Wow)	2015	—	—	—	—	—	—	—	—	—	—	Non-album singles
"F U Pay Me" (with Da Brat ft. The-Dream)	2016	—	—	—	—	—	—	—	—	—	—	Non-album singles
"Alessandro Michele" (with Da Brat)	2016	—	—	—	—	—	—	—	—	—	—	Non-album singles
"So Loveable"	2016	—	—	—	—	—	—	—	—	—	—	Non-album singles
"Not So You"	2016	—	—	—	—	—	—	—	—	—	—	Non-album singles
"This Lil' Game We Play" (ft. Nelly, Ashanti and Juicy J)	2024	—	—	—	—	—	—	—	—	—	—	Non-album singles

=== As featured artist ===
List of singles as featured artist, with selected chart positions, showing year released and album name
Title	Year	Peak chart positions				Album
Title	Year	US	US R&B	US Rap	UK	Album
"Live and Die for Hip Hop" (Kris Kross ft. Jermaine Dupri, Aaliyah, Da Brat and Mr. Black)	1996	72	36	11	—	Young, Rich & Dangerous
"We Just Wanna Party with You" (Snoop Doggy Dogg ft. Jermaine Dupri)	1997	—	—	—	21	Men in Black soundtrack
"The Way That You Talk" (Jagged Edge ft. Da Brat and Jermaine Dupri)	1997	—	—	—	—	A Jagged Era
"With Me" (Destiny's Child ft. Jermaine Dupri)	1998	—	—	—	19	Destiny's Child
"Imagination" (Tamia ft. Jermaine Dupri)	1998	37	12	—	—	Tamia
"Get None" (Tamar ft. Jermaine Dupri and Amil)	1999	—	59	—	—	Tamar
"Keys to the Range" (Jagged Edge ft. Jermaine Dupri)	1999	—	—	—	—	In Too Deep (soundtrack) and J.E. Heartbreak
"Bounce with Me" (Lil' Bow Wow ft. Jermaine Dupri and Xscape)	2000	20	1	1	—	Beware of Dog
"Ghetto Girls" (Lil' Bow Wow ft. Jermaine Dupri and Jagged Edge)	2001	91	40	14	—	Beware of Dog
"Someone to Call My Lover (Remix)" (Janet Jackson ft. Jermaine Dupri)	2001	3	11	—	11	All for You
"Thank You" (Lil' Bow Wow ft. Jagged Edge, Fundisha and Jermaine Dupri)	2001	93	47	21	—	Doggy Bag
"Basketball" (Bow Wow ft. Jermaine Dupri, Fundisha and Fabolous)	2002	—	44	25	—	Like Mike soundtrack
"Too Hood" (Monica ft. Jermaine Dupri)	2002	—	111	—	—	All Eyez on Me
"Pop That Booty" (Marques Houston ft. Jermaine Dupri)	2003	76	34	—	23	MH
"Wat Da Hook Gon Be" (Murphy Lee ft. Jermaine Dupri)	2003	17	11	6	—	Murphy's Law
"Fresh Azimiz" (Bow Wow ft. J-Kwon and Jermaine Dupri)	2005	23	13	6	—	Wanted
"It's Like That" (Mariah Carey ft. Fatman Scoop and Jermaine Dupri)	2005	16	17	—	4	The Emancipation of Mimi
"Get Your Number" (Mariah Carey ft. Jermaine Dupri)	2005	—	—	—	9	The Emancipation of Mimi
"Stunnas" (Jagged Edge ft. Jermaine Dupri)	2006	—	—	—	—	The Hits
"Feelin' You" (3LW ft. Jermaine Dupri)	2006	—	—	—	—	Non-album single
"Dem Jeans" (Chingy ft. Jermaine Dupri)	2006	59	57	19	85	Hoodstar
"I'm Throwed" (Paul Wall ft. Jermaine Dupri)	2007	87	47	21	—	Get Money, Stay True
"Finer Things" (DJ Felli Fel ft. Ne-Yo, Kanye West, Jermaine Dupri and Fabolous)	2008	— (Note: "Finer Things" did not enter the Billboard Hot 100, but peaked at number one on the Bubbling Under Hot 100 Singles chart.)	80	8	—	Non-album single
"Stepped on My J'z" (Nelly ft. Ciara and Jermaine Dupri)	2008	90	104	—	—	Brass Knuckles
"Good Good" (Ashanti ft. Jermaine Dupri)	2008	—	30	—	—	The Declaration
"Roc the Mic" (Bow Wow ft. Jermaine Dupri)	2009	—	—	—	—	New Jack City II
"Boomerang" (DJ Felli Fel ft. Akon, Pitbull and Jermaine Dupri)	2011	—	—	—	—	Non-album single
"—" denotes a recording that did not chart or was not released in that territory.

== Other certified songs ==
List of songs, with selected certifications, showing year released and album name
Title	Year	Certifications	Album
"Your Woman Has Just Been Sighted (Ring The Alarm)" (Nate Dogg featuring Jermaine Dupri)	2001	RMNZ: Gold	Music & Me

== Videography ==
=== 1993 ===
- "It's a Shame" (Kris Kross)
- "Alright" (Kris Kross)
- "I'm Real" (Kris Kross)
- "Just Kickin' It" (Xscape)

=== 1994 ===
- "Funkdafied" (Da Brat)
- "Give It To You" (Da Brat)

=== 1996 ===
- "Live and Die for Hip Hop" (Kris Kross ft. Da Brat, Aaliyah, Jermaine Dupri & Mr. Black)
- "Touch Myself (Remix)" (T-Boz ft. Richie Rich)
- "Ghetto Love" (Da Brat ft. T-Boz)

=== 1997 ===
- "You Make Me Wanna" (Usher)
- "In My Bed So So Def Remix" (Dru Hill ft. Jermaine Dupri & Da Brat)
- "My Way" (Usher)
- "The Way That You Talk" (Jagged Edge ft. Da Brat)

=== 1998 ===
- "With Me" (Destiny's Child ft. Jermaine Dupri)
- "Money Ain't a Thang" (Jermaine Dupri ft. Jay-Z)
- "Sweetheart" (Jermaine Dupri ft. Mariah Carey)
- "The Party Continues" (Jermaine Dupri ft. Da Brat & Usher)

=== 1999 ===
- "Da Ballers" (Master P ft. Jermaine Dupri)

=== 2000 ===
- "Get None" (Tamar Braxton ft. Jermaine Dupri & Amil)
- "Jumpin' Jumpin' (So So Def Remix) (Destiny's Child ft. Bow Wow, Jermaine Dupri & Da Brat)
- "I've Got to Have It" (Jermaine Dupri ft. Nas & Monica)
- "Let's Get Married" (Jagged Edge)(only in voice)
- "Bounce with Me" (Bow Wow ft. Xscape)
- "Let's Get Married (So So Def Remix)" (Jagged Edge ft. Rev Run of Run-D.M.C.)
- "Bow Wow (That's My Name)" (Bow Wow ft. Snoop Dogg)

=== 2001 ===
- "Puppy Love" (Bow Wow ft. Jagged Edge)
- "Where the Party At" (Jagged Edge ft. Nelly)
- "Ghetto Girls" (Bow Wow)
- "Where the Party At (So So Def Remix)" (Jagged Edge ft. Jermaine Dupri, Da Brat, Bow Wow R.O.C & Tigah)
- "Thank You" (Bow Wow ft. Fundisha & Jagged Edge)
- "What's Going On" (Jermaine Dupri ft. Bono, Britney Spears, Christina Aguilera, Jennifer Lopez, Jagged Edge, Gwen Stefani, Mary J. Blige, Backstreet Boys, Destiny's Child, Diddy, Lil' Kim, Fred Durst of Limp Bizkit, Eve, Monica, Nelly Furtado, Nona Gaye, Darren Hayes, Ja Rule, Alicia Keys, Aaron Lewis of Staind, Nas, Nelly, *NSYNC, Michael Stipe of R.E.M., Usher, Wyclef Jean)
- "Someone To Call My Lover (So So Def Remix)" (Janet Jackson ft. Jermaine Dupri)
- "Welcome to Atlanta" (Jermaine Dupri ft. Ludacris)

=== 2002 ===
- ""Ballin' out of Control" (Jermaine Dupri ft. Nate Dogg)
- "I Got It 2" (Jagged Edge ft. Nas)
- "Welcome to Atlanta (coast to coast remix)" (Jermaine Dupri ft. Diddy, Murphy Lee & Snoop Dogg)
- "Take Ya Home" (Bow Wow)
- "Basketball (Bow Wow ft. Fundisha, Fabolous & Jermaine Dupri)

=== 2003 ===
- "Miss P." (Cherish ft. Da Brat & Jermaine Dupri)
- "Right Thurr (remix)" (Chingy ft. Trina & Jermaine Dupri)
- "Pop That Booty" (Marques Houston ft. Jermaine Dupri)
- "Wat Da Hook Gon Be" (Murphy Lee ft. Jermaine Dupri)
- "Let's Get Down" (Bow Wow ft. Birdman)

=== 2004 ===
- "What's It Like"(So So Def Remix) (Jagged Edge ft. Jermaine Dupri)
- "Take Ya Clothes Off" (Ying Yang Twins ft. Bone Crusher)
- "Tipsy" (J-Kwon)
- "Hood hop" (J-Kwon)

=== 2005 ===
- "Introduction" (SunN.Y. ft. Jermaine Dupri & Lex Dirty)
- "What It Iz" (Young Capone ft. Nitty)
- "Let Me Hold You" (Bow Wow ft. Omarion)
- "I'm Hot" (Young Capone ft. Daz Dillinger & T-Roc)
- "Oh, I Think They Like Me" (Dem Franchize Boyz ft. Da Brat, Jermaine Dupri & Bow Wow)
- "Baby Mama Love" (N2Uft. Jermaine Dupri)
- "Gotta Getcha" (Jermaine Dupri ft. Johnta Austin)
- "Fresh Azimiz (Bow Wow ft. J-Kwon & Jermaine Dupri) (only in voice background)
- "Fresh Azimiz (Remix) (Bow Wow ft. Mike Jones, J-Kwon & Jermaine Dupri) (only in voice background)
- "Ridin' Rims" (Dem Franchize Boyz)
- "Lean wit It, Rock wit It" (Dem Franchize Boyz)
- "Grillz" (Nelly ft. Paul Wall, Ali & Gipp, & Brandi Williams of Blaque)

=== 2006 ===
- "So Amazing" (Jagged Edge)
- "So Amazing" (So So Def Remix) (Jagged Edge ft. Julio Voltio)
- "Pullin' Me Back" (Chingy ft. Tyrese)
- "Dem Jeans" (Chingy ft. Jermaine Dupri)
- "Turn It Up (Johnta Austin ft. Jermaine Dupri)
- "Stunnas" (Jagged Edge ft. Jermaine Dupri)
- "Feelin You" (3LW ft. Jermaine Dupri)
- "Shortie Like Mine" (Bow Wow ft. Chris Brown)
- "On Some Real Shit" (Daz Dillinger ft. Rick Ross)
- "Call on Me" (Janet Jackson ft. Nelly) (only in voice background)
- "Better Start Talking" (Donell Jones ft. Jermaine Dupri)
- "Everytime tha Beat Drop" (Monica ft. Dem Franchize Boys)
- "Hard N Da Paint" (Ali & Gipp ft. Nelly)

=== 2007 ===
- "I'm Throwed (Paul Wall ft. Jermaine Dupri)
- "Almost Made Ya" (Ali & Gipp ft. LeToya) (only in voice background)
- "Put A Little Umph In It/Whole Town Laughing" (Jagged Edge)
- "Lil' L.O.V.E. (Bone Thugs-n-Harmony ft. Mariah Carey & Bow Wow)
- "Baby Don't Go (Fabolous ft. T-Pain & Jermaine Dupri)
- "5000 Ones (DJ Drama ft. Nelly, T.I., Yung Joc, Willie the Kid, Young Jeezy, Diddy & Twista)

=== 2008 ===
- "Umma Do Me" (Rocko)
- "Get Buck in Here" (DJ Felli Fel ft. Diddy, Akon, Ludacris, & Lil Jon)
- "And Me Up" (9th Ward ft. Nitti & Jermaine Dupri)
- "I Luv Your Girl" (The-Dream ft. Young Jeezy)
- "Streetz On Lock" (Hot Dollar) (only in voice background)
- "Stepped On My J'z" (Nelly ft. Jermaine Dupri & Ciara)
- "Good Good" (Ashanti) (only in voice background)
- "On A Mission" (Q ft. Jermaine Dupri)
- "Everybody Hates Chris" (Ludacris)

=== 2009 ===
- "Roc The Mic" (Bow Wow ft. Jermaine Dupri)
- "You Can Get It All" (Bow Wow ft. Jermaine Dupri) (only in voice background)
- "So Much Swag" (Ocean's Seven ft. Bow Wow)
- "Vegas Baby" (Ocean's Seven)
- "Can't Stop Partying" with Weezer and Lil Wayne
