= Like Mike (soundtrack) =

Like Mike: Music From the Motion Picture

Soundtrack album by various artists
- Released: July 2, 2002
- Recorded: 2001–2002
- Studio: SouthSide Studios (Atlanta, GA); Larrabee Sound Studios; JNB Studios; PatchWerk Recording Studios (Atlanta, GA); KrucialKeys Studios; Majestic Studios (North Hollywood, CA); Baseline Studios; Lobo Studios (Long Island, NY); Studio 805 (Atlanta, GA)
- Genre: Hip hop; R&B
- Length: 35:42
- Label: So So Def; Columbia; Sony Music Soundtrax
- Producer: Chris Stokes; Cutmaster Swiff; Jermaine Dupri; Just Blaze; Kerry Brothers Jr.; Platinum Status; Pop-Trax; Rainfall; The Neptunes; Trackmasters

Singles from Like Mike: Music From the Motion Picture
- 1. "Rule" Released: October 6, 2001; 2. "Take Ya Home" Released: March 12, 2002; 3. "Basketball" Released: June 24, 2002

Professional ratings
Review scores
Source	Rating
AllMusic	3/5 stars

Like Mike: Music From the Motion Picture is the soundtrack to John Schultz's 2002 American sports comedy film Like Mike. It was released on July 2, 2002 through So So Def/Columbia/Sony Soundtrax and consists of hip hop and contemporary R&B music. Production was handled by Jermaine Dupri, Chris Stokes, Cutmaster Swiff, Just Blaze, Kerry Brothers Jr., Platinum Status, Pop-Trax, Rainfall, The Neptunes and Trackmasters, with Alicia Keys and LaMarquis Jefferson serving as co-producers. It features contributions from the film star Lil' Bow Wow, as well as Amerie, B2K, Jagged Edge, Jermaine Dupri, Fabolous, Fundisha, Mario, R.O.C., Solange Knowles, The Crowd Pleasers, TQ and Young Steff.

The album debuted at number 18 on the Billboard 200 and number 10 on the Top R&B/Hip-Hop Albums in the United States. Its single "Basketball", a cover version of Kurtis Blow's 1984 song, reached number 44 on the Hot R&B/Hip-Hop Songs and number 25 on the Hot Rap Songs in the US and number 53 on the Swiss Hitparade and number 81 in GfK Entertainment charts.

The album also features two singles released the previous year — "Rule" and "Take Ya Home". "Rule", taken from Nas' fifth studio album Stillmatic, peaked at number 67 on the Hot R&B/Hip-Hop Songs in the US. "Take Ya Home", which was taken from Lil' Bow Wow's second album Doggy Bag and serves as the theme song for the film, made it to number 72 on the Billboard Hot 100.

The soundtrack marks the final album wherein Lil' Bow Wow uses "Lil'" in his moniker and is also Bow Wow's final album under So So Def Recordings.

== Track listing ==
No.	Title	Writer(s)	Producer(s)	Length
1.	"Basketball" (Lil' Bow Wow, Jermaine Dupri, Fabolous and Fundisha)	Kurtis Walker; James Biggs Moore III; Robert Ford Jr.; William Waring; Jimmy Bralower; Full Force	Jermaine Dupri; LaMarquis Jefferson (co.)	3:19
2.	"NBA 2K2" (R.O.C.)	Rahman Griffin; Jermaine Dupri Mauldin	Jermaine Dupri	2:09
3.	"I Remember" (TQ and Jagged Edge)	Terence Quaites; Brandon Casey; Brian Casey; Marlon Lindsey; Christopher Grant	Rainfall	4:21
4.	"Take Ya Home" (Lil' Bow Wow)	Pharrell Williams; Chad Hugo; Mauldin	The Neptunes; Jermaine Dupri (voc.)	3:59
5.	"Put Me On" (Mario)	Kerry Brothers Jr.; Alicia Augello-Cook; Bertram Charles Reid Jr.; Norman Durham; Ronald Miller; Woodrow Cunningham Jr.	Krucial; Alicia Keys (co.)	3:39
6.	"Playin' the Game" (Lil' Bow Wow)	Justin Smith; Mauldin	Just Blaze; Jermaine Dupri (voc.)	4:32
7.	"Dance With You" (Solange and B2K)	Solange Knowles; Kelton Kessee; Marques Houston; Tony Oliver; Jerome Jones; Ketrina Askew	Chris Stokes; Platinum Status	3:00
8.	"Can I Holla" (Young Steff and Lil' Bow Wow)	George Goldsboro; James Rollins; Leon Huff Jr.; Mauldin	Pop-Trax	3:28
9.	"Rule" (Nas and Amerie)	Nasir Jones; Amerie Rogers; Jean-Claude Olivier; Samuel Barnes; Ian Stanley; Roland Orzabal; Chris Hughes	Trackmasters	3:56
10.	"Hoop It Up" (T.C.P.)	Anthony Lamar Wilkins; Darrell Dwayne Parham; Dival J. Rivera; Michael A. Jordan; Archie Hall	Cutmaster Swiff	3:19
Total length:				35:42

== Other songs ==
- These songs did appear in the film but were not released on the soundtrack:
1. "Radio Athletico" by Derek Dah Large & The BloodSuckas
2. "Feel the Beat" by Darude
3. "Fired Up" by Funky Green Dogs
4. "Rock and Roll Part 2" by Gary Glitter
5. "Party Up (Up in Here)" by DMX
6. "Getcha Head in the Game" by Baha Men
7. "Badinerie" and "Polinaise Double" by ARS Rediviva Orchestra
8. "Topsy, Part 2" by Cozy Cole
9. "Bounce" by Überzone
10. "Jump!" by The Movement
11. "Funky Cold Medina" by Tone Lōc

== Charts ==
=== Weekly charts ===
Weekly chart performance for Like Mike: Music From the Motion Picture
Chart (2002)	Peak position
US Billboard 200	18
US Top R&B/Hip-Hop Albums (Billboard)	10

=== Year-end charts ===
Year-end chart performance for Like Mike: Music From the Motion Picture
Chart (2002)	Position
Canadian R&B Albums (Nielsen SoundScan)	120
Canadian Rap Albums (Nielsen SoundScan)	65
