= Bryan-Michael Cox =

American musician (born 1977)

- Born: Bryan-Michael Paul Cox; December 1, 1977 (age 48); Miami, Florida, U.S.
- Origin: Houston, Texas, U.S.
- Genres: R&B
- Occupations: Musician; record producer; songwriter
- Years active: 1994–present
- Labels: Team Idris; So So Def; Warner Chappell
- Member of: Ocean's 7

Bryan-Michael Paul Cox (born December 1, 1977) is an American musician, record producer, and songwriter, known for his work with artists such as Usher, Mariah Carey, Mary J. Blige, and Toni Braxton. His most notable productions are "Be Without You" for Mary J. Blige, "Burn", "Confessions Part II" and "U Got It Bad" for Usher, and "Shake It Off", "I Stay In Love" and "You Don't Know What To Do" for Mariah Carey.

While attending Kinder High School for the Performing and Visual Arts in Texas, Cox met singer Beyoncé. He began producing songs for Destiny's Child prior to their signing with Columbia Records. Cox relocated to Atlanta to pursue his professional music career in 2000, where he established a partnership with Jermaine Dupri and became in-house talent for his So So Def Recordings record label.

Cox attained a Guinness World Record for the longest consecutive period of chart success by spending over 5 consecutive years there, breaking the record that was previously held by The Beatles. In 2009, Cox was inducted into the Georgia Music Hall of Fame for his contribution to music.

== Early life ==
Cox has said that his mother played the flute: "My mom would buy music instead of food when I was little. We would spend her entire pay check at the record store." He expressed his musical ambitions to her when he was seven years old, having written his first song when he was just six years old. Later, he enrolled in Houston's Kinder High School for the Performing and Visual Arts.

In high school, Cox met Beyoncé when he was a senior and she was a freshman. He recorded his first-ever demo tape with her. Although the two wouldn't reconnect until nearly seven years later when Bryan produced a track on Destiny's Child's Destiny Fulfilled, it was the early confirmation from Mathew Knowles that prompted Bryan to go into the music industry.

"Back then, there was three choices if you wanted to be in the music industry: live in New York, LA, or Atlanta. I enrolled in Clark Atlanta University because although my mom supported my dreams one hundred percent I had to go to college, so I chose Clark because I was just trying to get to Atlanta."

== Career ==
=== 1994–1999: Early career ===
Cox began his career as an intern at Noontime Records in Atlanta, Georgia. He was discovered by his manager Chris Hicks, who was a partner in Noontime. Cox's first two hit singles as a producer were "Get Gone" & "Creep Inn" for the short-lived R&B group Ideal.

=== 2000–2005: Confessions, The Emancipation of Mimi, The Breakthrough ===
Cox contributed to Lil Bow Wow's debut album, Beware of Dog, writing the single "Puppy Love" and the Big Momma's House soundtrack. He worked with Jagged Edge's second studio album J.E. Heartbreak, contributing to songs "He Can't Love U" and "Let's Get Married". He contributed to Tamar Braxton's debut album, Tamar co-writing and producing "Get None" with musical partner Jermaine Dupri. He wrote and co-produced the second single "Just Be a Man About It" from Toni Braxton's third studio album, The Heat.

Cox worked with Usher, contributing to Confessions, co-writing and co-producing Billboard Hot 100 number-one songs "Burn" and "Confessions Part II". Confessions won Best Contemporary R&B Album at the 2005 Grammys. Confessions has been certified diamond by the Recording Industry Association of America (RIAA) and, as of 2012, has sold 10.3 million copies in the United States. It has sold over 20 million copies worldwide. He worked with Mariah Carey again on 2005's The Emancipation of Mimi with hits "Shake It Off" and "Don't Forget About Us". "Don't Forget About Us" was nominated for two Grammy Awards. He wrote the fourth single from Chris Brown's self-titled debut album "Say Goodbye". He co-wrote "Be Without You" the lead single from Mary J. Blige seventh studio album The Breakthrough. The single was certified double-platinum in the United States, was nominated for Record of the Year and Song of the Year and won the Best R&B Song and Best Female R&B Vocal Performance categories at the 49th Annual Grammy Awards.

=== 2006–2009 ===
Cox co-wrote "Shortie Like Mine" the first single for Bow Wow's fifth studio album, The Price of Fame, in 2006. Again working with Austin together the duo co-wrote "Stay Down" for Mary J. Blige's eighth studio album, Growing Pains in 2007. Cox became the executive producer on Brandy’s unreleased album, Sweet Nothings, her originally planned fifth studio album with a projected release date sometime in 2007, working on numerous songs on the album alongside Kendrick "WyldCard" Dean, Adonis Shropshire and Eric Hudson. Cox co-wrote "Last Time" for Trey Songz's second studio album Trey Day. Cox produced and co-wrote "Circles", the third single from Marques Houston's Veteran album. In 2008, he wrote five songs for the group Day26's self-titled debut album, including the second single, "Since You've Been Gone".

=== 2010–present ===
In 2010, he co-wrote and produced "Never Let You Go", the single for My World 2.0, the debut studio album by Justin Bieber. For Mariah Carey he co-wrote and co-produced "Oh Santa!", alongside Jermaine Dupri and Carey, for her second Christmas/thirteenth studio album, Merry Christmas II You. He added song writing and production on Usher's Grammy award-winning album Raymond vs Raymond. In the same year, Cox co-produced the single "Love All Over Me", the single from Monica's sixth studio album, Still Standing. He worked on Love and War for Tamar Braxton in 2013. He worked with Johntá Austin co-writing for R. Kelly's thirteenth studio album The Buffet, and on Views for Drake. Cox co-wrote on Free TC for Ty Dolla Sign.

=== Legacy ===
Cox went on to co-produce alongside his musical mentor Jermaine Dupri. He has had 35 number-one hits, 12 Grammy Award nominations, including nine wins, 20 top-ten hits, and eclipsing the record previously held by the Beatles for Billboard's most consecutive number-one hits. Cox has been named one of Billboard's "Top 10 Producers of the Decade" and sits on Billboard's "Hot R&B Song of the Decade List", "Hot 100 Songs of the Decade List", "Top 200 Albums of the Decade List" and is a 2009 Georgia Music Hall of Fame inductee. He has been awarded the Billboard Songwriter of the Year Award and the SESAC Songwriter of the Year Award six consecutive years.

== Song writing and producing credits ==
Artist	Year	Song	Role	Album
3LW	2006	"Feelin' You"	Writer & producer	Point of No Return
3LW	2006	"The Way I Feel About You"	Writer & producer	Point of No Return
Aaliyah	2002	"Come Over"	Writer & producer	I Care 4 U
Ari Lennox	2021	"Pressure"	Writer & producer	Age/Sex/Location
Avant	2006	"Director"	Writer & producer	Director
B5	2007	"Erika Kane"	Writer & producer	Don't Talk, Just Listen
B5	2007	"Right To Left"	Writer & producer	Don't Talk, Just Listen
Bobby V	2007	"How 'Bout It"	Writer & producer	Special Occasion
Bobby V	2011	"Are You the Right One"	Writer & producer	Fly on the Wall
Bow Wow	2000	"Bounce with Me"	Writer	Beware of Dog
Bow Wow	2000	"Bow Wow (That's My Name)"	Writer	Beware of Dog
Bow Wow	2000	"Ghetto Girls"	Writer	Beware of Dog
Bow Wow	2000	"Puppy Love"	Writer	Beware of Dog
Bow Wow	2000	"The Dog in Me"	Writer	Beware of Dog
Bow Wow	2000	"This Playboy"	Writer	Beware of Dog
Bow Wow	2000	"You Know Me"	Writer	Beware of Dog
Bow Wow	2001	"All I Know"	Writer & producer	Doggy Bag
Bow Wow	2001	"Crazy"	Writer & producer	Doggy Bag
Bow Wow	2001	"Get Up"	Writer & producer	Doggy Bag
Bow Wow	2001	"Off the Glass"	Writer & producer	Doggy Bag
Bow Wow	2001	"Pick of the Litter"	Writer & producer	Doggy Bag
Bow Wow	2001	"Thank You"	Writer & producer	Doggy Bag
Bow Wow	2001	"Take Ya Home"	Writer	Doggy Bag
Bow Wow	2001	"Up in Here"	Writer & producer	Doggy Bag
Bow Wow	2005	"Go"	Writer & producer	Wanted
Bow Wow	2005	"Like You"	Producer	Wanted
Bow Wow	2006	"Shortie Like Mine"	Writer	The Price of Fame
Bow Wow	2009	"You Can Get It All"	Producer	New Jack City II
Brandy	2007	"Make Me Cry"	Writer & producer	Sweet Nothings
Brandy	2007	"You Got That"	Writer & producer	Sweet Nothings
Brandy	2007	"Take Me Back"	Writer & producer	Sweet Nothings
Brandy	2007	"Sober"	Writer & producer	Sweet Nothings
Brandy	2007	"Love Me The Most"	Writer & producer	Sweet Nothings
Bryson Tiller	2015	"Don't" (samples "Shake It Off")	Writer	Trapsoul
Carl Thomas	2007	"If You Ever"	Writer & producer	So Much Better
Chris Brown	2005	"Say Goodbye"	Writer & producer	Chris Brown
Chris Brown	2005	"Winner"	Writer & producer	Chris Brown
Chris Brown	2007	"Fallen Angel"	Producer	Exclusive
Chris Brown	2007	"Throwed"	Producer	Exclusive
Ciara	2006	"So Hard"	Writer & producer	Ciara: The Evolution
Danity Kane	2006	"Back Up"	Writer & producer	Danity Kane
Danity Kane	2006	"One Shot"	Writer & producer	Danity Kane
Danity Kane	2006	"Ride for You"	Writer & producer	Danity Kane
Danity Kane	2008	"2 of You"	Writer & producer	Welcome to the Dollhouse
Danity Kane	2008	"Sucka for Love"	Writer & producer	Welcome to the Dollhouse
Day26	2008	"Are We in This Together"	Writer & producer	Day26
Day26	2008	"Don't Fight the Feeling"	Writer & producer	Day26
Day26	2008	"Exclusive (No Excuses)"	Writer & producer	Day26
Day26	2008	"Since You've Been Gone"	Writer & producer	Day26
Day26	2009	"Babymaker"	Writer & producer	Forever in a Day
Day26	2009	"Need That"	Writer & producer	Forever in a Day
Day26	2009	"So Good"	Writer & producer	Forever in a Day
Day26	2009	"Stadium Music"	Writer & producer	Forever in a Day
Destiny's Child	2004	"Bad Habit"	Writer & producer	Destiny Fulfilled
Dru Hill	2002	"If I Could"	Writer & producer	Dru World Order
dvsn	2020	"For Us"	Writer & producer	A Muse in Her Feelings
dvsn	2020	"No Crying"	Writer & producer	A Muse in Her Feelings
Ella Mai	2018	"Dangerous"	Writer & producer	Ella Mai
Fantasia	2004	"Got Me Waiting"	Writer & producer	Free Yourself
Fantasia	2006	"Only One U"	Writer & producer	Fantasia
Ginuwine	2002	"Stingy"	Writer & producer	The Senior
Ginuwine	2009	"Last Chance"	Writer & producer	A Man's Thoughts
Ginuwine	2009	"One Time for Love"	Writer & producer	A Man's Thoughts
Ginuwine	2011	"Busy"	Producer	Elgin
Ginuwine	2011	"Drink of Choice"	Writer & producer	Elgin
Ginuwine	2011	"Frozen"	Producer	Elgin
Jagged Edge	1999	"Did She Say"	Writer & producer	J.E. Heartbreak
Jagged Edge	1999	"Healing"	Writer & producer	J.E. Heartbreak
Jagged Edge	1999	"Heartbreak"	Writer & producer	J.E. Heartbreak
Jagged Edge	1999	"He Can't Love U"	Writer & producer	J.E. Heartbreak
Jagged Edge	1999	"Keys to the Range"	Writer & producer	J.E. Heartbreak
Jagged Edge	1999	"Let's Get Married"	Writer & producer	J.E. Heartbreak
Jagged Edge	1999	"Promise"	Writer & producer	J.E. Heartbreak
Jagged Edge	1999	"What You Tryin' to Do"	Writer & producer	J.E. Heartbreak
Jagged Edge	2001	"Best Man"	Writer & producer	Jagged Little Thrill
Jagged Edge	2001	"Cut Somethin'"	Writer & producer	Jagged Little Thrill
Jagged Edge	2001	"Goodbye"	Writer & producer	Jagged Little Thrill
Jagged Edge	2001	"I Got It"	Writer & producer	Jagged Little Thrill
Jagged Edge	2001	"Remedy"	Writer & producer	Jagged Little Thrill
Jagged Edge	2001	"Respect"	Writer & producer	Jagged Little Thrill
Jagged Edge	2001	"This Goes Out"	Producer	Jagged Little Thrill
Jagged Edge	2001	"Where the Party At"	Writer & producer	Jagged Little Thrill
Jagged Edge	2003	"I Don't Wanna"	Writer & producer	Hard
Jagged Edge	2003	"Shady Girl"	Writer & producer	Hard
Jagged Edge	2003	"Tryna Be Your Man"	Writer & producer	Hard
Jagged Edge	2003	"Visions"	Writer & producer	Hard
Jagged Edge	2003	"Walked Outta Heaven"	Writer & producer	Hard
Jagged Edge	2014	"Familiar"	Writer & producer	J.E. Heartbreak 2
Jagged Edge	2014	"Future"	Writer & producer	J.E. Heartbreak 2
Jagged Edge	2014	"Getting Over You"	Writer & producer	J.E. Heartbreak 2
Jagged Edge	2014	"Hope"	Writer & producer	J.E. Heartbreak 2
Jagged Edge	2014	"It's Been You"	Producer	J.E. Heartbreak 2
Jagged Edge	2014	"Love Come Down"	Writer & producer	J.E. Heartbreak 2
Jagged Edge	2014	"Make It Clear"	Writer & producer	J.E. Heartbreak 2
Jagged Edge	2014	"Ready"	Writer & producer	J.E. Heartbreak 2
Jagged Edge	2014	"Things I Do For You"	Writer & producer	J.E. Heartbreak 2
Jagged Edge	2014	"Wanna Be (Romeo)"	Producer	J.E. Heartbreak 2
Joe	2007	"Feel for You"	Writer & producer	Ain't Nothin' Like Me
Joe	2007	"Go Hard"	Writer & producer	Ain't Nothin' Like Me
Joe	2007	"My Love"	Writer & producer	Ain't Nothin' Like Me
Joe	2007	"Run It Back"	Writer & producer	Ain't Nothin' Like Me
Joe	2007	"You Should Know Me"	Producer	Ain't Nothin' Like Me
Joe	2008	"By Any Means"	Writer & producer	Joe Thomas, New Man
Joe	2008	"Man In Your Life"	Writer & producer	Joe Thomas, New Man
Joe	2008	"I Won't Let Him Hurt You"	Writer & producer	Joe Thomas, New Man
Joe	2008	"We Need to Roll"	Writer & producer	Joe Thomas, New Man
Justin Bieber	2010	"Never Let You Go"	Writer & producer	My World 2.0
Kehlani	2017	"Personal" (sample "Come Over")	Writer	SweetSexySavage
Kehlani	2020	"Can I" (sample "Come Over")	Writer	It Was Good Until It Wasn't
Keyshia Cole	2007	"Was It Worth It?"	Writer & producer	Just like You
Lil' Mo	2003	"4Ever"	Writer & producer	Meet the Girl Next Door
Lil' Mo	2007	"Heartbeat"	Writer & producer	Pain & Paper
Mariah Carey	1999	"How Much"	Writer & producer	Rainbow
Mariah Carey	2002	"Miss You"	Writer & producer	Charmbracelet
Mariah Carey	2002	"The One"	Writer & producer	Charmbracelet
Mariah Carey	2002	"You Had Your Chance"	Writer & producer	Charmbracelet
Mariah Carey	2005	"Get Your Number"	Writer & producer	The Emancipation of Mimi
Mariah Carey	2005	"Shake It Off"	Writer	The Emancipation of Mimi
Mariah Carey	2005	"Don't Forget About Us"	Writer & producer	The Emancipation of Mimi (Deluxe Edition)
Mariah Carey	2005	"Makin' It Last All Night (What It Do)"	Writer	The Emancipation of Mimi (Deluxe Edition)
Mariah Carey	2008	"For the Record"	Writer & producer	E=MC²
Mariah Carey	2008	"I Stay In Love"	Writer & producer	E=MC²
Mariah Carey	2008	"4real4real" (featuring Da Brat)	Writer & producer	E=MC²
Mariah Carey	2010	"Oh Santa!"	Writer & producer	Merry Christmas II You
Mariah Carey	2014	"Heavenly (No Ways Tired / Can't Give Up Now)"	Producer	Me. I Am Mariah... The Elusive Chanteuse
Mariah Carey	2014	"Make It Look Good"	Writer & producer	Me. I Am Mariah... The Elusive Chanteuse
Mariah Carey	2014	"One More Try"	Producer	Me. I Am Mariah... The Elusive Chanteuse
Mariah Carey	2014	"Supernatural"	Writer & producer	Me. I Am Mariah... The Elusive Chanteuse
Mariah Carey	2014	"You Don't Know What To Do"	Writer & producer	Me. I Am Mariah... The Elusive Chanteuse
Marques Houston	2007	"Circle"	Writer & producer	Veteran
Marques Houston	2007	"Exclusively"	Writer & producer	Veteran
Mary J. Blige	2005	"Ain't Really Love"	Writer & producer	The Breakthrough
Mary J. Blige	2005	"Be Without You"	Writer & producer	The Breakthrough
Mary J. Blige	2006	"Reflections (I Remember)"	Writer & producer	Reflections (A Retrospective)
Mary J. Blige	2006	"We Ride (I See the Future)"	Writer & producer	Reflections (A Retrospective)
Mary J. Blige	2007	"If You Love Me?"	Writer & producer	Growing Pains
Mary J. Blige	2007	"Stay Down"	Writer & producer	Growing Pains
Mary J. Blige	2009	"We Got Hood Love"	Writer & producer	Stronger with Each Tear
Monica	2002	"I'm Back"	Writer & producer	All Eyez on Me
Monica	2002	"If U Were the Girl"	Writer & producer	All Eyez on Me
Monica	2002	"Searchin"	Producer	All Eyez on Me
Monica	2002	"Too Hood"	Writer & producer	All Eyez on Me
Monica	2002	"U Should've Known Better"	Writer & producer	All Eyez on Me
Monica	2006	"Hell No (Leave Home)"	Writer & producer	The Makings of Me
Monica	2010	"Lesson Learned"	Writer & producer	Still Standing
Monica	2010	"Love All Over Me"	Writer & producer	Still Standing
Monica	2010	"Still Standing"	Writer & producer	Still Standing
Monica	2010	"Superman"	Writer & producer	Still Standing
Monica	2012	"Amazing"	Writer & producer	New Life
Nivea	2001	"Don't Mess with My Man"	Writer & producer	Nivea
Nivea	2005	"Parking Lot"	Writer & producer	Complicated
Omarion	2006	"Just Can't Let You Go"	Writer & producer	21
Omarion	2006	"Made For TV"	Writer & producer	21
Tamar Braxton	2000	"Get None"	Writer & producer	Tamar
Tamar Braxton	2013	"Pieces"	Writer & producer	Love and War
Tamar Braxton	2013	"Where It Hurts"	Writer & producer	Love and War
Tamia	2004	"Still"	Writer & producer	More
Toni Braxton	2000	"Just Be a Man About It"	Writer & producer	The Heat
Toni Braxton	2005	"Trippin' (That's the Way Love Works)"	Writer & producer	Libra
Toni Braxton	2005	"What's Good"	Writer & producer	Libra
Trey Songz	2007	"Last Time"	Writer & producer	Trey Day
Trey Songz	2009	"One Love"	Writer & producer	Ready
Tyrese	2001	"Off the Heezy"	Writer & producer	2000 Watts
Tyrese	2002	"Somebody Special"	Writer & producer	I Wanna Go There
Tyrese	2006	"Gotta Get You"	Writer & producer	Alter Ego
Usher	2001	"Good Ol' Ghetto"	Writer & producer	8701
Usher	2001	"If I Want To"	Writer & producer	8701
Usher	2001	"I Can't Let U Go"	Writer & producer	8701
Usher	2001	"T.T.P."	Writer & producer	8701
Usher	2001	"U Got It Bad"	Writer & producer	8701
Usher	2001	"U-Turn"	Writer & producer	8701
Usher	2004	"Burn"	Writer & producer	Confessions
Usher	2004	"Confessions Part I"	Writer & producer	Confessions
Usher	2004	"Confessions Part II"	Writer & producer	Confessions
Usher	2004	"Do It to Me"	Writer & producer	Confessions
Usher	2008	"Before I Met You"	Writer & producer	Here I Stand
Usher	2010	"Foolin' Around"	Writer & producer	Raymond v. Raymond
Usher	2019	"Don't Waste My Time"	Writer & producer	Confession 2
