= Beware of Dog (album) =

Studio album by Lil' Bow Wow
- Released: September 26, 2000
- Recorded: 1999–2000
- Genres: Hip hop; R&B
- Length: 34:29
- Labels: So So Def; Columbia
- Producers: Jermaine Dupri; Michael Mauldin

Lil' Bow Wow chronology
Beware of Dog (2000)	Doggy Bag (2001)

Singles from Beware of Dog
- 1. "Bounce with Me" Released: August 8, 2000; 2. "Bow Wow (That's My Name)" Released: October 17, 2000; 3. "Puppy Love" Released: January 31, 2001; 4. "Ghetto Girls" Released: February 21, 2001

Beware of Dog is the debut album by the American rapper Lil' Bow Wow. It was released on September 26, 2000, through So So Def Recordings and Columbia Records. Recording sessions took place from 1999 to 2000, with Lil' Bow Wow's mentor Jermaine Dupri primarily producing the album, and Xscape, Jagged Edge, Da Brat and Snoop Dogg appearing as guests, among others.

Beware of Dog received generally positive reviews from music critics and was also commercially successful, debuting at number 8 on the US Billboard 200 chart and selling 101,000 copies in the first week. The Recording Industry Association of America (RIAA) certified it double platinum in March 2001.

== Singles ==
Four singles were released from the album, all produced by Lil' Bow Wow's mentor and hip-hop record producer Jermaine Dupri. The album's lead single "Bounce with Me", released on August 8, 2000, features guest vocals from the American R&B group Xscape, and was also included on the soundtrack for the film Big Momma's House (2000). The album's second single "Bow Wow (That's My Name)", released on October 17, 2000, features a guest rap from Snoop Dogg. The album's third single "Puppy Love", released on January 27, 2001, features guest vocals from the R&B group Jagged Edge, and the album's fourth and final single "Ghetto Girls" was released on February 21, 2001.

== Critical reception ==
Professional ratings
Review scores
Source	Rating
AllMusic	3.5/5 stars
Robert Christgau	(dud)
HipHopDX	3.5/5 stars
NME	3.5/5 stars

Beware of Dog received mixed reviews from music critics. AllMusic editor Jason Birchmeier praised the tracks for encapsulating the album with endearing charm in its pop-rap material despite doubting Lil Bow Wow's actual writing credits, concluding that "All the same, there's no denying the charm and vocal dexterity of Lil Bow Wow, who proves himself genuinely talented, if not exactly a prodigy." An editor from HipHopDX said that despite Lil Bow Wow's age showing in his lyrics, found potential in his ability to deliver tough lyricism with "Bow Wow (That's My Name)" being a great starting point, concluding that "Beware of Dog is a definite keeper and a trademark to the So So Def dynasty. This album is clear cut winner in my opinion to potentially be rated for best debut album of the year." Robert Christgau graded the album as a "dud", indicating "a bad record whose details rarely merit further thought."

== Commercial performance ==
Beware of Dog debuted at number 8 on the US Billboard 200 chart, selling 101,000 copies in the first week. This became Bow Wow's first US top-ten debut. On March 5, 2001, the album was certified double Platinum by the Recording Industry Association of America (RIAA) for shipments of over 2 million copies. By December 2006, the album sold 2.7 million copies in the United States, according to Nielsen Soundscan. In Canada, the album also reached Platinum status, selling over 100,000 copies.

== Track listing ==
- All tracks produced by Jermaine Dupri, except the intro.

No.	Title	Writer(s)	Length
1.	"Intro"		0:21
2.	"The Future" (featuring R.O.C.)	Shad Moss; Bryan-Michael Cox; Jermaine Dupri; Rahman Griffin; Terron Mitchell	2:36
3.	"Bounce with Me" (featuring Xscape)	Moss; Dupri; LaTocha Scott; Tameka Cottle; Tamika Scott; Shawntae Harris; Cox	2:56
4.	"Puppy Love" (featuring Jagged Edge)	Moss; Brian Casey; Brandon Casey; Cox; Dupri; Bobby Erving; Darryl Pierce; Dwayne Simon; James Todd Smith	3:29
5.	"You Know Me" (featuring Jermaine Dupri and Da Brat)	Moss; Dupri; Harris; Cox	3:08
6.	"The Dog in Me"	Moss; Cox; Dupri	3:22
7.	"Bow Wow (That's My Name)" (featuring Snoop Dogg)	Moss; Cox; Dupri; Calvin Broadus, Jr.; George Clinton; Garry Shider; David Spradley	3:44
8.	"This Playboy" (featuring R.O.C., Jermaine Dupri and Big Duke)	Moss; Cox; Lee Dixon; Dupri; Griffin	3:37
9.	"Ghetto Girls"	Moss; Cox; Dupri; Mitchell; Wilton Felder	3:15
10.	"You Already Know"	Moss; Dupri; Carl So-Lowe	3:18
11.	"Bounce with Me" (extended LP mix; featuring Xscape)	Moss; Cox; L. Scott; Cottle; T. Scott; Harris; Dupri	4:43
Total length:			34:29

== Personnel ==
- Credits taken from AllMusic.

- Kwaku Alston – photography
- Big Duke – performer
- Lil Bow Wow – vocals
- Bryan-Michael Cox – performer
- Da Brat – performer
- Jermaine Dupri – executive producer, mixing, production
- Brian Frye – engineering
- Erwin Gorostiza – art director
- Bernie Grundman – mastering
- Bill Hermans – engineering
- John Horesco IV – engineering, mixing
- Jagged Edge – performer
- Carlton Lynn – engineering
- William Marshall – grooming
- Michael Mauldin – executive producer
- Snoop Dogg – performer
- Phil Tan – mixing
- Xscape – performer
- R.O.C. – performer

== Charts ==
=== Weekly charts ===
Chart (2000–2001)	Peak position
Australian Albums (ARIA)	36
Belgian Albums (Ultratop Flanders)	44
Belgian Albums (Ultratop Wallonia)	23
Canadian R&B Albums (Nielsen SoundScan)	11
Dutch Albums (Album Top 100)	66
French Albums (SNEP)	41
German Albums (Offizielle Top 100)	61
New Zealand Albums (RMNZ)	21
Swedish Albums (Sverigetopplistan)	42
Swiss Albums (Schweizer Hitparade)	34
UK Albums (Official Charts)	79
UK R&B Albums (Official Charts)	19
US Billboard 200	8
US Top R&B/Hip-Hop Albums (Billboard)	3

=== Year-end charts ===
Year-end chart performance for Beware of Dog
Chart (2001)	Position
Canadian Albums (Nielsen SoundScan)	146
Canadian R&B Albums (Nielsen SoundScan)	33
Canadian Rap Albums (Nielsen SoundScan)	16
US Billboard 200	36
US Top R&B/Hip-Hop Albums (Billboard)	19

=== Decade-end charts ===
Chart (2000–2009)	Position
US Billboard 200	195

== Certifications ==
Region	Certification	Certified units/sales
Canada (Music Canada)	Platinum	100,000^{^}
France (SNEP)	Gold	100,000^{*}
New Zealand (RMNZ)	Gold	7,500^{^}
United States (RIAA)	2× Platinum	2,000,000^{^}
^{*} Sales figures based on certification alone.^{^} Shipments figures based on certification alone.
