= Ego Trip (Kurtis Blow album) =

Studio album by Kurtis Blow
- Released: 1984
- Genre: Hip-hop
- Length: 42:48
- Label: Mercury/Polydor; 822 420
- Producer: J.B. Moore, Robert Ford Jr.

Kurtis Blow chronology
The Best Rapper on the Scene (1983)	Ego Trip (1984)	America (1985)

Singles from Ego Trip
- 1. "8 Million Stories" Released: 1984; 2. "Ego Trip" Released: 1984; 3. "Basketball" Released: 1984

Professional ratings
Review scores
Source	Rating
AllMusic	3/5 stars
Christgau's Record Guide	B−
The Encyclopedia of Popular Music	3/5 stars
The Philadelphia Inquirer	4/5 stars
The Rolling Stone Album Guide	2/5 stars

Ego Trip is the fourth album by the rapper Kurtis Blow, released in 1984 on Mercury Records. The only charting singles were "8 Million Stories", which peaked at 45 on the Hot Black Singles chart, and "Basketball", which peaked at 71 on the Hot 100.

== Critical reception ==
Trouser Press dubbed Ego Trip one of Blow's "state-of-the-art in an almost mainstream vein" early albums, noting that the inclusion of Run-D.M.C. was a "concerted effort to get hipper." The Washington Post wrote that Blow "knows how to mix plain talk with his rhymes, so that his records carry an extra bit of street feel, but his most impressive moments come when he exploits the studio, as he does on the intoxicatingly sinuous 'AJ Scratch'." The Philadelphia Inquirer wrote that "the hit single 'Eight Million Stories' suggests that other people are worthier subjects of his songwriting than Kurtis Blow."

In a tribute to "Basketball" and its legacy, Slam wrote that "none of the NBA/hip-hop empire building happens—or at the very least none of it happens the way we remember it happening—without the skills of Kurtis Blow."

== Track listing ==
1. "8 Million Stories" – 8:00 (featuring Run-D.M.C.)
2. "AJ Scratch" – 5:48
3. "Basketball" – 6:30
4. "Under Fire" – 7:23
5. "I Can't Take It No More" – 4:14
6. "Ego Trip" – 5:34
7. "Fallin Back in Love Again" – 5:23

== Charts ==
=== Weekly charts ===
Chart (1984–1985)	Peak position
US Billboard 200	83
US Top R&B/Hip-Hop Albums (Billboard)	18

=== Year-end charts ===
Chart (1985)	Position
US Top R&B/Hip-Hop Albums (Billboard)	47
