= Big Momma's House (soundtrack) =

Big Momma's House: Music from the Motion Picture

Soundtrack album by various artists
- Released: May 30, 2000
- Recorded: 1999–2000
- Genres: Hip hop; R&B
- Length: 53:39
- Label: So So Def
- Producers: Michael Mauldin (exec.); Jermaine Dupri (also exec.); Bryan-Michael Cox; Chris Robinson; Ira Antelis; Kandi Burruss; Keith Anders; Kevin "She'kspere" Briggs; Lil' Jon; Poke and Tone; Warren G

Singles from Big Momma's House
- 1. "I've Got to Have It" Released: May 2, 2000; 2. "Bounce with Me" Released: August 8, 2000

Professional ratings
Review scores
| Source | Rating |
|---|---|
| AllMusic | 2.5/5 stars |

Big Momma's House: Music from the Motion Picture is the soundtrack to Raja Gosnell's 2000 comedy film Big Momma's House. It was released on May 30, 2000, via So So Def Recordings and consisted of hip hop and R&B music. Production was primarily handled by Jermaine Dupri. The soundtrack was a minor success, making it to 41 on the Billboard 200 and 12 on the Top R&B/Hip-Hop Albums, and featured three singles, "Bounce with Me", "I've Got to Have It" and "Get Up".

The song "Bounce with Me" served as the film's theme song, and the soundtrack's lead single. In addition to this, this is the only film in the series to have a soundtrack.

== Track listing ==
| No. | Title | Writer(s) | Producer(s) | Length |
|---|---|---|---|---|
| 1. | "That's What I'm Looking For" (Da Brat featuring Missy "Misdemeanor" Elliott and Jermaine Dupri) | Jermaine Dupri; Shawntae Harris; Melissa Elliott | Jermaine Dupri | 4:03 |
| 2. | "I've Got to Have It" (Jermaine Dupri and Nas featuring Monica) | Dupri; Nasir Jones; Monica Arnold; Bryan-Michael Cox; Peter Gabriel | Jermaine Dupri; Bryan-Michael Cox^{[a]} | 3:24 |
| 3. | "What I'm Gon' Do to You" (Kandi Burruss) | Kandi Burruss; Kevin Briggs | Kevin "She'kspere" Briggs; Kandi | 3:50 |
| 4. | "Bounce with Me" (Lil Bow Wow featuring Xscape) | Dupri; Harris; Cox | Jermaine Dupri; Bryan-Michael Cox^{[a]} | 3:23 |
| 5. | "You Can Always Go" (Jagged Edge and Blaque featuring R.O.C.) | Brian Casey; Brandon Casey; Rahman Griffin; James Pennington; Cox | Bryan-Michael Cox | 3:38 |
| 6. | "Radio" (Kurupt, Phats Bossi and R.O.C.) | Ricardo Brown; Late Bankoudagba; Griffin; Warren Griffin III; Gary Goetzman; Mike Piccirillo | Warren G | 4:26 |
| 7. | "Big Momma's Theme" (Da Brat and Vita featuring Destiny’s Child) | Dupri; Harris; Cox; Tamara Savage; Taheem Crocker | Jermaine Dupri; Bryan-Michael Cox^{[a]} | 3:14 |
| 8. | "Treated Like Her" (LaTocha Scott and Chanté Moore) | Dupri; LaTocha Scott; Cox; Savage | Jermaine Dupri; Bryan-Michael Cox^{[a]} | 4:34 |
| 9. | "I Like Dem Girlz" (Lil Jon & The Eastside Boyz) | Jonathan Smith; Sam Norris; Steve Standard | Lil Jon | 4:35 |
| 10. | "I Want to Kiss You" (Devin Vasquez) | Smith; Katrina C. Willis; Robert Hazard | Lil Jon | 3:31 |
| 11. | "Love's Not Love" (Marc Nelson) | Brenda Russell; Jo Jo Robinson; Ira Antelis; Kevyn Lewis | Chris Robinson; Ira Antelis; Poke & Tone | 3:39 |
| 12. | "Ooh Big Momma" (Lil Jon & The Eastside Boyz) | Smith; Norris; Maurice Cenac | Lil Jon | 3:48 |
| 13. | "Get Up" (Jessica) | Jessica Betts; Keith Anders | Keith Anders | 4:07 |
| 14. | "I Still Got to Have It" (Jermaine Dupri and Nas featuring Monica) | Dupri; Jones; Arnold; Cox | Bryan-Michael Cox^{[a]} | 3:27 |
| Total length: | | | | 53:39 |

Notes

- ^{^[a]} signifies a co-producer

== Charts ==
| Chart (2000) | Peak position |
|---|---|
| US Top R&B/Hip-Hop Albums (Billboard) | 12 |
