= Sweat (Bow Wow song) =

2011 single by Bow Wow featuring Lil Wayne

Single by Bow Wow featuring Lil Wayne

from the album Underrated (shelved)
- Released: October 14, 2011
- Length: 4:52
- Label: LBW; Cash Money; Universal Republic
- Songwriter(s): Shad Moss; Dwayne Carter; Brandon Green; Noel Fisher; Rocco Valdes; Jermaine Preyan
- Producer(s): Maejor; Detail

Bow Wow singles chronology
"Ain't Thinkin' 'Bout You" (2011)	"Sweat" (2011)	"Better" (2012)

Lil Wayne singles chronology
"Just in Love (Remix)" (2011)	"Sweat" (2011)	"I'm a Boss (Remix)" (2011)

Music video
- "Sweat" on YouTube

"Sweat" is a song by American rapper Bow Wow featuring American rapper Lil Wayne, released on October 14, 2011. Produced by Maejor and Detail, it was planned to be a promotional single from Bow Wow's then-titled album Underrated, but remained a single when the album was canceled.

== Critical reception ==
Earmilk gave a favorable review of the song, writing "they make for a dope sound. Lil Wayne always brings a fire beat and this is no different as he and Bow Wow go off and create a smooth banger."

== Music video ==
A behind-the-scenes clip shot by Derick G. and images of the video shoot were released in November 2011, before the official music video was released on January 31, 2012. It shows Bow Wow wearing a spiked leather face mask, accompanied by leather and chain-clad models, and rides in a Bugatti. Lil Wayne is seen wearing a T-shirt reading "Weirdo", shorts and Vans, and holds a skateboard. Rapper Birdman makes a cameo, appearing alongside the artists. In the clip, Bow Wow's female co-star takes a guitar and smashes his plaques. Bow Wow explained the plaques resemble his old albums and their destruction represents a "new beginning" since he signed to Young Money Entertainment.

== Charts ==
Chart (2011)	Peak position
US Billboard Hot 100	48
US Bubbling Under R&B/Hip-Hop Songs (Billboard)	4
