= Ain't Thinkin' 'Bout You =

Single by Bow Wow featuring Chris Brown
- Released: September 22, 2010
- Recorded: 2010
- Genre: Hip-hop; R&B
- Length: 3:50
- Label: LBW, Cash Money, Universal Motown
- Songwriters: Justin “ J “ Wright, Shad Moss, Kevin McCall,
- Producer: Kevin McCall

Bow Wow singles chronology
"For My Hood" (2010)	"Ain't Thinkin' 'Bout You" (2010)	"Sweat" (2011)

Chris Brown singles chronology
"Get Back Up" (2010)	"Ain't Thinkin' 'Bout You" (2010)	"No Bullshit" (2011)

"Ain't Thinkin' 'Bout You" is a song by the American rapper Bow Wow featuring Chris Brown. An early version appeared on Brown's collaborative mixtape with Tyga, Fan of a Fan.

== Music video ==
=== Synopsis ===
The music video premiered on October 30, 2010, via World Star Hip Hop. The video begins with Bow Wow reading a letter from his fiancé, breaking off their engagement. It continues with other scenes from their relationship, including the proposal, and Brown and Bow Wow partying poolside and singing on a brick road. Birdman makes an appearance in the video. The video was directed by Colin Tilley.

=== Reception ===
BET placed the music video at number 75 on its "Notarized: Top 100 Videos of 2010" countdown.

== Charts ==
Chart (2010)	Peak position
US Bubbling Under Hot 100 (Billboard)	11
US Hot R&B/Hip-Hop Songs (Billboard)	51
US Hot Rap Songs (Billboard)	23
US Rhythmic Airplay (Billboard)	40

== Certifications ==
Region	Certification	Certified units/sales
New Zealand (RMNZ)	Gold	15,000^{‡}
^{‡} Sales+streaming figures based on certification alone.
