= Basketball (song) =

1984 song by Kurtis Blow

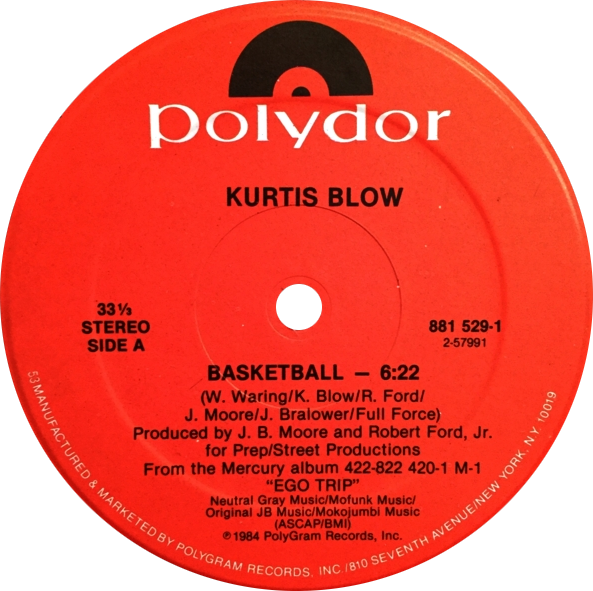
- Side A of the 12-inch US vinyl single

Single by Kurtis Blow

from the album Ego Trip
- Released: 1984
- Recorded: 1984
- Genre: Hip-hop
- Length: 6:22
- Label: Mercury; Polydor
- Songwriters: Kurtis Walker; Full Force; Jimmy Bralower; James B. Moore; Billy Bill
- Producers: Robert Ford Jr.; J. B. Moore

Kurtis Blow singles chronology
"Ego Trip" (1984)	"Basketball" (1984)	"America" (1985)

Music video
- "Basketball" on YouTube

"Basketball" is a rap song written by Robert Ford, Kurtis Blow, J. B. Moore, Jimmy Bralower, and Full Force and recorded by Kurtis Blow, released in 1984 from his fourth album Ego Trip.

== Song history ==
According to Blow, the idea for the song came from his girlfriend (whom he later married), who told him, "You need to make a song about basketball, it's the No. 1 sport for African-Americans and nobody has done it yet." Twenty-five famous basketball players are mentioned during the recording. Waring was primarily responsible for choosing which players would be mentioned in the song, but Blow specified that his favorite player, Julius "Dr. J" Erving, would be mentioned first. Blow said in 2013, "We wanted the guys we grew up watching who were all out of the league by the time the song came out, and the best of that time." The lyrics consist of rhymed couplets, a structure that has been described as "typical of early-1980s rap". The song's hook was sung by Alyson Williams, who later had hit songs of her own on the R&B chart.

The music video for the song was directed by Michael Oblowitz, who had a $25,000 budget. The video included cameos by hip hop groups The Fat Boys and Whodini. Although Blow had wanted the video to include footage of the players mentioned in the song, the National Basketball Association would only provide clearance for use of still photos of Micheal Ray Richardson (who is not mentioned in the lyrics).

Nevertheless, the NBA later took an interest in Blow's song and played it at games, as well as creating its own video that featured clips of every player mentioned in the song. Blow said, "When the song was peaking, the NBA started flying me around to do shows. ... I would do a live performance right after the game to fill the arena."

== Players mentioned ==
In order of first mention

- Julius Erving ("Dr. J")
- Moses Malone
- Nate Archibald ("Tiny")
- Earl Monroe ("Earl The Pearl")
- Wilt Chamberlain
- Oscar Robertson ("Big O")
- Jerry West
- Magic Johnson
- Larry Bird
- Bernard King
- Kareem Abdul-Jabbar
- Walt Frazier ("Clyde")
- Rick Barry
- Pete Maravich ("Pistol Pete")
- Isiah Thomas
- George Gervin ("Iceman")
- Adrian Dantley
- Dominique Wilkins
- Ralph Sampson
- Bill Russell
- Darryl Dawkins
- Boston Celtics
- Willis Reed
- Patrick Ewing
- Michael Jordan
- Cazzie Russell
- New York Knicks

== Charts ==
Chart (1984–1985)	Peak position
US Billboard Hot 100	71
US Billboard Hot Black Singles	29

== Lil' Bow Wow version ==
"Basketball"

Single by Lil' Bow Wow featuring Jermaine Dupri, Fabolous and Fundisha

from the album Like Mike: Music From the Motion Picture
- Released: June 24, 2002
- Recorded: 2001
- Length: 3:18
- Label: Columbia; So So Def
- Songwriters: Sammie Bush; Jermaine Mauldin; John Jackson; Fundisha Johnson; LaMarquis Jefferson; Full Force
- Producers: Jermaine Dupri; LaMarquis Jefferson

Lil' Bow Wow singles chronology
"Take Ya Home" (2001)	"Basketball" (2002)	"Let's Get Down" (2003)

Fabolous singles chronology
"Young'n" (2001)	"Basketball" (2002)	"Automatic" (2002)

Jermaine Dupri singles chronology
"Welcome 2 Atlanta (Coast 2 Coast Remix)" (2002)	"Basketball" (2002)	"Pop That Booty" (2002)

Lil' Bow Wow covered the song in 2002, featuring Jermaine Dupri, Fabolous and Fundisha for the Like Mike soundtrack.

Although a substantial amount of the original song's lyrics are present, this version updates many of the NBA players rhapsodized. Names include (in order of mention):

- Michael Jordan ("MJ")
- Jason Kidd ("J-Kidd"); also featured in the movie
- Tracy McGrady ("T-Mac"); also featured in the movie
- Alonzo Mourning ("Alonzo"); also featured in the movie
- Darius Miles ("Darius")
- Allen Iverson; also featured in the movie
- Harlem Globetrotters
- Los Angeles Lakers
- Vince Carter; also featured in the movie
- Dikembe Mutombo

=== Charts ===
Chart (2002–2003)	Peak position
Germany (GfK)	81
Switzerland (Schweizer Hitparade)	53
US Billboard Hot R&B/Hip-Hop Singles & Tracks	44
US Billboard Hot Rap Singles	25
