= Take Ya Home =

Single by Lil' Bow Wow

from the album Doggy Bag and Like Mike: Music From the Motion Picture
- Released: March 12, 2002
- Recorded: 2001
- Genre: Hip-hop
- Length: 4:00
- Label: So So Def
- Songwriters: Jermaine Mauldin; Pharrell Williams; Charles Hugo
- Producer: The Neptunes

Lil' Bow Wow singles chronology
"Thank You" (2001)	"Take Ya Home" (2002)	"Basketball" (2002)

"Take Ya Home" is the second and final single from Lil' Bow Wow's second album Doggy Bag (2001). The song also serves as the theme song to the 2002 film Like Mike, which was Bow Wow's first starring role in a motion picture. It samples "Have a Nice Day" by Roxanne Shante.

Although the liner notes for the Doggy Bag album list Aaliyah Minter and Khim Davis as having vocal appearances on the song, in many other areas "Take Ya Home" is shown to be a feature-less record.

== Charts ==
=== Weekly charts ===
Chart (2002)	Peak position
Australia (ARIA Charts)	90
US Billboard Hot 100	72
US Hot R&B/Hip-Hop Songs (Billboard)	21
US Rhythmic Airplay (Billboard)	37

=== Year-end charts ===
Chart (2002)	Position
US Hot R&B/Hip-Hop Songs (Billboard)	91
