= You Can Get It All =

Single by Bow Wow featuring Johntá Austin

from the album New Jack City II
- Released: December 9, 2008
- Recorded: 2008
- Genre: Pop-rap
- Length: 3:37
- Label: Columbia
- Songwriters: Shad Moss, Antonio Reid, Kenneth Edmonds, Daryl Simmons, Omari Grandberry
- Producers: Jermaine Dupri, Bryan-Michael Cox, L-Roc

Bow Wow singles chronology
"Roc the Mic" (2009)	"You Can Get It All" (2008)	"For My Hood" (2010)

Johntá Austin singles chronology
"Video" (2007)	"You Can Get It All" (2008)	"Shawty Wus Up" (2010)

"You Can Get It All" is the first official single off Bow Wow's sixth album, New Jack City II. It features Johntá Austin and contains an intro from Jermaine Dupri. The song samples the TLC song "Baby-Baby-Baby".

The track was the only single for the album to make it on to the original track list for the project. The two other singles for New Jack City II ("Marco Polo" and "Big Girls") were added as bonus tracks as part of a Walmart edition of the album.

== Music video ==
A music video for "You Can Get It All" has been made. It was produced by Jermaine Dupri and was shot in Malibu, California. It features Johntá Austin. The video was directed by Hype Williams. As of March 2024, the music video currently sits at 18 million views on YouTube.

== Charts ==
Chart (2009)	Peak position
New Zealand (Recorded Music NZ)	17
US Billboard Hot 100	55
US Hot R&B/Hip-Hop Songs (Billboard)	30
US Hot Rap Songs (Billboard)	9
US Rhythmic Airplay (Billboard)	10

== Certifications ==
Certification for "You Can Get It All"
Region	Certification	Certified units/sales
New Zealand (RMNZ)	Gold	15,000^{‡}
^{‡} Sales+streaming figures based on certification alone.

== Release history ==
Release dates and formats for "You Can Get It All"
Region	Date	Format	Label(s)	Ref.
United States	April 28, 2009	Mainstream airplay	Columbia	
