= Ghetto Girls =

2001 single by Lil' Bow Wow

Single by Lil' Bow Wow

from the album Beware of Dog
- Released: February 21, 2001
- Recorded: 2000
- Genre: Pop rap
- Length: 3:16
- Label: So So Def
- Songwriters: Jermaine Mauldin; Bryan-Michael Cox; Terron Mitchell; Wilton Felder
- Producer: Jermaine Dupri

Lil' Bow Wow singles chronology
"Puppy Love" (2001)	"Ghetto Girls" (2001)	"Thank You" (2001)

"Ghetto Girls" is a song by Lil' Bow Wow. It is the fourth and final single from his debut album Beware of Dog (2000). It features background vocals by Jagged Edge. The song samples "All in My Mind" by Soul for Real.

== Music video ==
The video premiered on 106 & Park on June 19, 2001. It features cameos by B2K, Da Brat, Wingo and Kyle of Jagged Edge, Eve, and Jermaine Dupri.

== Charts ==
Chart (2001)	Peak position
US Billboard Hot 100	91
US Billboard Hot R&B/Hip-Hop Songs	40
US Billboard Rap Songs	14
