= Doggy Bag =

Studio album by Lil' Bow Wow
- Released: December 18, 2001
- Recorded: 2000–01
- Genre: Hip hop
- Length: 36:01
- Labels: Columbia; So So Def
- Producers: Jermaine Dupri; Bryan Michael Cox; The Neptunes

Lil' Bow Wow chronology
Beware of Dog (2000)	Doggy Bag (2001)	Unleashed (2003)

Singles from Doggy Bag
- 1. "Thank You" Released: November 5, 2001; 2. "Take Ya Home" Released: March 12, 2002

Professional ratings
Review scores
Source	Rating
AllMusic	3/5 stars
Rolling Stone	2.5/5 stars
USA Today	3/4 stars

Doggy Bag is the second studio album by American rapper Lil' Bow Wow. It was released on December 18, 2001 through Columbia Records and Jermaine Dupri's So So Def Recordings. Recording sessions for the album took place from 2000 to 2001. The production on the album was primarily handled by Jermaine Dupri and Bryan-Michael Cox. The album also features guest appearances by Jagged Edge, Da Brat and Xscape among others.

Doggy Bag was supported by two singles: the first single "Thank You", which samples The Cars' "I'm Not the One", and the second single "Take Ya Home", which was also featured on the soundtrack to Lil' Bow Wow's 2002 film, Like Mike. The album received generally mixed reviews from music critics but was commercially successful, debuting at number eleven on the US Billboard 200 chart and selling 319,000 copies in its first week.

== Commercial performance ==
On January 23, 2002, the album was certified platinum by the Recording Industry Association of America (RIAA) for shipments of over a million copies. This was Lil Bow Wow's fastest selling album going Platinum in just three weeks of release. As of December 2006, the album has sold 1.1 million copies in the United States, according to Nielsen Soundscan.

== Track listing ==
No.	Title	Writer(s)	Producer(s)	Length
1.	"We Want Weezy (Intro)"	Bryan-Michael Cox, Jermaine Dupri, Eric Wright, George Clinton, Maceo Parker	Dupri, Cox*	1:18
2.	"Thank You" (featuring Jagged Edge and Fundisha)	Cox, Dupri, Ric Ocasek	Dupri, Cox*	4:00
3.	"Take Ya Home"	Cox, Dupri, Chad Hugo, Pharrell Williams	The Neptunes	3:59
4.	"Get Up" (featuring Fundisha)	Cox, Dupri	Dupri, Cox*	3:43
5.	"Perfect Girl (Interlude)"			0:50
6.	"All I Know" (featuring Lil Corey)	Cox, Dupri, Larry Johnson, Michael Edwin Johnson, Dennis Lambert, August Moon, Brian Potter, Tyrone Thomas	Dupri, Cox*	3:13
7.	"The Wickedest"	Cox, Dupri	Dupri, Cox*	3:56
8.	"Pick of the Litter" (featuring R.O.C and Tigah)	Cox, Sheppard "Tigah" Daniels III, Dupri, Rahman "R.O.C." Griffin	Dupri, Cox*	3:34
9.	"Crazy" (featuring Da Brat and Sleepy Brown)	Cox, Dupri, Shawntae "Da Brat" Harris, LaMarquis Jefferson, Patrick Brown	Dupri, Cox*	4:19
10.	"Crazy Girls (Interlude)"			0:30
11.	"Up in Here" (featuring Tigah)	Cox, Daniels, Dupri	Dupri, Cox*	3:47
12.	"Jiminy Cricket (Interlude)"			0:08
13.	"Off the Glass" (featuring Xscape)	Shad Moss, Cox, Daniels, Dupri	Dupri, Cox*	5:24

(*) denotes co-producer.

Notes

- Track 1, "We Want Weezy (Intro)" features uncredited vocals by Jermaine Dupri.
- Track 2, "Take Ya Home" features uncredited vocals by Aaliyah Minter and Khim Davis.
- Track 9, "Crazy" features uncredited vocals by Sleepy Brown.

Sample credits

- Track 1, "We Want Weezy (Intro)" samples "We Want Eazy" as performed by Eazy-E, and written by Eric Wright, George Clinton and Maceo Parker. And "Ahh...The Name Is Bootsy, Baby" written by Bootsy Collins, George Clinton, and Maceo Parker.
- Track 2, "Thank You" samples "I'm Not the One" as performed by The Cars, and written by Ric Ocasek.
- Track 3, "Take Ya Home" samples "Have a Nice Day" as performed by Roxanne Shanté.
- Track 6, "All I Know" samples "Candy Girl" as performed by New Edition, and written by Larry Johnson, Michael Edwin Johnson, Dennis Lambert, August Moon, Brian Potter and Tyrone Thomas.

== Personnel ==
Credits taken from Allmusic site.

- Sleepy Brown – vocals
- Teresa Caldwell – stylist
- Andrew Coleman – recording
- Bryan-Michael Cox – production
- Jermaine Dupri – executive producer, production, vocal production
- Kris Feldman – art director, design
- Brian Frye – recording
- Bernie Grundman – mastering
- John Horesco IV – engineering assistant
- LaMarquis Jefferson – bass guitar
- Brian "Bonehead" Kinkead – vocal engineering
- Tadd Mingo – assistant
- Jonathan Mannion – photography
- The Neptunes – mixing
- Billy Odum – guitar
- Phil Tan – mixing

== Charts ==
=== Weekly charts ===
Weekly chart performance for Doggy Bag
Chart (2001-02)	Peak position
US Billboard 200	11
US Top R&B/Hip-Hop Albums (Billboard)	3

=== Year-end charts ===
2001 year-end chart performance for Doggy Bag
Chart (2001)	Position
Canadian R&B Albums (Nielsen SoundScan)	127
Canadian Rap Albums (Nielsen SoundScan)	65

2002 year-end chart performance for Doggy Bag
Chart (2002)	Position
Canadian R&B Albums (Nielsen SoundScan)	77
Canadian Rap Albums (Nielsen SoundScan)	38
US Billboard 200	63
US Top R&B/Hip-Hop Albums (Billboard)	16

== Certifications ==
Region	Certification	Certified units/sales
United States (RIAA)	Platinum	1,000,000^{^}
^{^} Shipments figures based on certification alone.
