= New Jack City II =

Studio album by Bow Wow
- Released: March 31, 2009
- Recorded: 2006–09
- Genres: Hip hop; gangsta rap; R&B
- Length: 43:06
- Labels: LBW; Columbia
- Producers: Jermaine Dupri; LRoc; the Runners; Nitti; J. R. Rotem; Scott Storch; Kane Beatz; DJ Toomp; Tha Bizness; Jim Jonsin; Lamar "Marz" Edwards; T.I.; T-Pain; Drumma Boy; Swizz Beatz; Cool & Dre; Polow da Don; J.U.S.T.I.C.E. League; Fatboi; Shawty Redd; BlackOut Movement; Ron Browz; Nard & B; Zaytoven; Marvelous J; Soulja Boy; The Inkredibles; Bigg D; DJ Nasty & LVM; The Legendary Traxster; Hookman; Antwan "Amadeus" Thompson

Bow Wow chronology
| Face Off (2007) | New Jack City II (2009) | Before 30 (2021) |

Singles from New Jack City II
- 1. "You Can Get It All" Released: December 9, 2008

Professional ratings
Review scores
| Source | Rating |
|---|---|
| AllMusic | 4/5 stars |
| Common Sense Media | 2/5 stars |
| DJBooth | 3.5/5 stars |
| IGN | 6.7/10 |
| PopMatters | 2/10 discs |
| The Smoking Section | 3/5 stars |
| USA Today | 2/4 stars |
| Vibe | (unfavorable) |
| XXL | (L) |

New Jack City II is the sixth studio album by American rapper Bow Wow. It was released through LBW Entertainment and Columbia Records on March 31, 2009. This album was Bow Wow's first to carry a parental advisory label for "adult language". Production on the album was handled by Bow Wow's longtime producer Jermaine Dupri alongside LRoc, Nitti, T-Pain, Swizz Beatz and others. It features guest appearances by Nelly, T.I., Trey Songz, Dondria and Ron Browz.

== Background ==
The executive producer on the album, Jermaine Dupri, based the album's title on the film, New Jack City (1991), feeling that the relationship between himself and Bow Wow was reminiscent of the rancorous but successful partnership between Nino and Gee Money, the two main drug dealers in the film. Three versions for this album were released: standard, limited edition including a bonus DVD, and a clean Walmart version with three bonus tracks.

== Singles ==
The lead single for his-then upcoming and untitled sixth album, called "You Can Get It All" was released on December 9, 2008. The song features guest vocals from American singer-songwriter Johntá Austin, while the song was produced by Bow Wow's frequent and long-time record producer Jermaine Dupri and Bryan-Michael Cox. This track contains a sample of TLC's hit "Baby, Baby, Baby".

=== Promotional singles ===
The album's promotional single, called "Marco Polo", in which features guest vocals from producer Soulja Boy Tell 'Em, was released accompanied by a music video shot at an aquatic park outside of Atlanta. The music video premiered via FNMTV on July 25, 2008.

The album's second promotional single, "Big Girls", accompanying by a music video, premiered on YouTube (which was released the same day, after the release of "Marco Polo"). The complete version was released later on YouTube for some time, but then removed again for unknown reasons. There is no official date on the videos re-release.

=== Other songs ===
A music video for the song "Roc the Mic" was shot in Los Angeles, California, near the Staples Center. Another video for "You Can Get It All" was filmed in Malibu. The video for "Pole in My Basement", with a strip club theme, was first available on Bow Wow's official YouTube page on May 30, 2009. While on his tour bus, Bow Wow also made unofficial videos for "Sunshine" "Like This" and "She's My".

== Commercial performance ==
New Jack City II debuted at number 16 on the US Billboard 200, selling 31,000 copies in its first week. The album also debuted at number five on the US Top R&B/Hip-Hop Albums chart.

== Track listing ==
Credits adapted from iTunes, Amazon and Discogs.

| No. | Title | Writer(s) | Producer(s) | Length |
|---|---|---|---|---|
| 1. | "Get That Paper" | Shad Moss; Chadron Moore | Nitti | 3:19 |
| 2. | "What They Call Me" (featuring Nelly and Ron Browz) | Jermaine Dupri; Aaron Davenport; Cornell Hayes, Jr.; James Calloway; Jaron Alston; Leroy Jackson | Dupri; LRoc^{[a]} | 3:58 |
| 3. | "Roc the Mic" (featuring Jermaine Dupri) | Dupri; Thomas Randolph Bell; Douglas Davis; Kenny Gamble; Linda Epstein; Ricky Walters | Dupri; LRoc^{[a]} | 3:48 |
| 4. | "Been Doin' This" (featuring T.I.) | Moss; Clifford Harris, Jr.; Lamar Edwards | Marz; T.I. | 4:52 |
| 5. | "You Can Get It All" (featuring Johntá Austin) | Dupri; Antonio M. Reid; Daryl Simmons; James Phillips; Kenneth "Babyface" Edmonds | Dupri; LRoc^{[a]} | 3:37 |
| 6. | "Sunshine" | Dupri; Lee Hazlewood | Dupri; LRoc^{[a]} | 3:27 |
| 7. | "Like This" (featuring Johntá Austin and Dondria) | Moss; Dupri; James Harris; Phillips; Jaron Alston; Terry Lewis | Dupri; LRoc^{[a]} | 3:40 |
| 8. | "She's My" (featuring T-Pain) | Darnell Bristol; David Balfour; Kenneth "Babyface" Edmonds; T-Pain | T-Pain | 3:51 |
| 9. | "I Ain't Playing" (featuring Trey Songz) | Dupri; Phillips; Austin | Dupri; LRoc^{[a]} | 4:47 |
| 10. | "Pole in My Basement" | Moss; Christopher Gholson | Christopher "Drumma Boy" Gholson | 4:16 |
| 11. | "Shake It" (featuring Swizz Beatz) | Moss; Kasseem Dean; Rahman Lang | Swizz Beatz | 3:31 |
| Total length: | | | | 43:06 |

Deluxe version bonus tracks
| No. | Title | Writer(s) | Producer(s) | Length |
|---|---|---|---|---|
| 12. | "Big Girls" (featuring Yung Joc) | Moss; Marlin "Hookman" Bonds | Hookman | 3:34 |
| 13. | "Marco Polo" (featuring Soulja Boy) | Moss; DeAndre Way | Soulja Boy | 4:17 |
| 14. | "Anything You Can Do" | Moss; Antwan "Amadeus" Thompson | Amadeus | 4:02 |

Notes

- ^{^[a]} signifies a co-producer.
- "Roc the Mic" features uncredited backing vocals by Dondria.
- "What They Call Me" features uncredited vocals by Jermaine Dupri.
- "Sunshine" features backing vocals by Johntá Austin.
- Although Track 2 is called "What They Call Me" in the official album notes, there are many areas (including on Bow Wow's official YouTube channel) where the song is titled "Big Time" or "What They Call Me (Big Time)".

Sample credits

- "What They Call Me" contains a sample of "Big Time", written by James Calloway, Leroy Jackson, and Aaron Davenport, as performed by Rick James.
- "Roc the Mic" contains a sample of "La Di Da Di", written by Douglas Davis and Ricky Walters, as performed by Doug E. Fresh, The Get Fresh Crew, and Slick Rick; the song also contains interpolations of "Break Up to Make Up", written by Thomas Randolph Bell, Linda Epstein, and Kenneth Gamble, as performed by the Stylistics.
- "You Can Get It All" contains interpolations of "Baby-Baby-Baby", written by Kenneth Edmonds, Antonio Reid, and Daryl Simmons, as performed by TLC.
- "Sunshine" contains elements of "These Boots Are Made for Walkin'", written by Lee Hazlewood, as performed by Nancy Sinatra.
- "Like This" contains interpolations of "Even When You Sleep", written by James Harris and Terry Lewis, as performed by the SOS Band.
- "She's My" contains interpolations and a sample of "Roni", written by Edmonds and Darnell Bristol, as performed by Bobby Brown.

== Personnel ==
- Bow Wow – vocals, production
- Johntá Austin – vocals
- Dondria – vocals
- Julio Miranda – guitar
- Eric "E Live" Florence – bass guitar
- David "Preach" Bal4 – keyboard

Visuals and imagery

- Mark Mann – photography
- Chris Feldmann – art director, design
- Chrystal Streets – stylist

Technical and production

- Dave Kutch – mastering
- Jermaine Dupri – production, vocal production, mixing
- Nitti – production
- Lamar "Mars" Edwards – production
- T.I. – production
- T-Pain – production
- Drumma Boy – production
- Swizz Beatz – production
- LRoc – co-production
- Elliott Carter – engineering, recording
- Aaron Holton – engineering
- John Horesco IV – engineering
- Alonzo Vargas – recording engineer
- Eddie "Shyboogs" Timmons – engineering, recording
- Javier Valverda – engineering, recording
- Miles Walker – engineering, recording
- Jordan "DJ Swivel" Young – engineering, recording
- Josh Gudwin – vocal engineering
- Phil Tan – mixing
- Leslie Brathwaite – mixing
- John Frye – mixing
- Fabian Marasciullo – mixing
- Ray Seay – mixing
- Duro – mixing
- John Horesco IV – recording
- David Bench – assistant
- Carlos Oyanedel – assistant
- Josh Houghkirk – assistant
- Ghazi Hourani – assistant
- Kegan Houston – assistant

== Charts ==
=== Weekly charts ===
| Chart (2009) | Peak position |
|---|---|
| US Billboard 200 | 16 |
| US Top R&B/Hip-Hop Albums (Billboard) | 5 |
| US Top Rap Albums (Billboard) | 2 |

=== Year-end charts ===
| Chart (2009) | Position |
|---|---|
| US Top R&B/Hip-Hop Albums (Billboard) | 96 |
