= Puppy Love (Bow Wow song) =

Single by Lil' Bow Wow featuring Jagged Edge

from the album Beware of Dog
- Released: January 31, 2001
- Recorded: 2000
- Genre: Hip hop, R&B
- Length: 3:29
- Label: So So Def Recordings
- Songwriters: Bryan-Michael Cox Brian Casey, Brandon Casey and Jermaine Dupri
- Producer: Jermaine Dupri

Lil' Bow Wow singles chronology
| "Bow Wow (That's My Name)" (2000) | "Puppy Love" (2001) | "Ghetto Girls" (2001) |

Jagged Edge singles chronology
| "Promise" (2000) | "Puppy Love" (2001) | "Where the Party At" (2001) |

"Puppy Love" is the third single by rapper Lil' Bow Wow's debut album Beware of Dog (2000). The song was written by Bryan-Michael Cox Brian Casey, Brandon Casey and Jermaine Dupri (who also produced the song). It features R&B group Jagged Edge and samples the beat of LL Cool J's song "Kanday" from his album Bigger and Deffer. The music video premiered on June 19, 2001, and features singer and actress Solange Knowles as the rapper's love interest.

== Charts ==
| Chart (2001) | Peak position |
|---|---|
| France (SNEP) | 84 |
| Germany (GfK) | 89 |
| Netherlands (Dutch Top 40 Tipparade) | 5 |
| Netherlands (Single Top 100) | 50 |
| Switzerland (Schweizer Hitparade) | 65 |
| US Billboard Hot 100 | 75 |
| US Hot R&B/Hip-Hop Songs (Billboard) | 27 |
| US Rap Airplay (Billboard) | 12 |
