= Bounce with Me =

2000 single by Lil' Bow Wow

Single by Lil' Bow Wow featuring Xscape

from the album Beware of Dog and Big Momma's House (soundtrack)
- Released: August 8, 2000
- Genre: Hip-hop; R&B
- Length: 2:56
- Label: So So Def
- Songwriters: Jermaine Mauldin; Shawntae Harris; Bryan-Michael Cox
- Producers: Bryan-Michael Cox; Jermaine Dupri

Lil' Bow Wow singles chronology
"Bounce with Me" (2000)	"Bow Wow (That's My Name)" (2000)

Xscape singles chronology
"My Little Secret" (1998)	"Bounce with Me" (2000)	"What's Up" (2005)

"Bounce with Me" is the debut single by American rapper Lil' Bow Wow featuring R&B girl group Xscape. Taken from his debut album Beware of Dog, the single samples "Love Serenade (Part II)" by Barry White. It spent nine weeks at number one on the Hot Rap Tracks and number 20 on Billboard Hot 100. The song was featured in the Quarles & Rhymer-wrote comedy film Big Momma's House and the trailer of the 2001 film Hardball. A radio remix and extended version featuring R.O.C. and Lil' Mo was also released.

In a January 2022 interview with Rory & Mal, producer Jermaine Dupri revealed that he wrote the first verse to the song while Da Brat wrote the second verse. This is why the second verse involves Lil Bow Wow using a faster flow on many different parts, as Dupri requested Da Brat to write the verse in the same cadence where she would typically use when she raps.

== Music video ==
The video, directed by Dave Meyers, features appearances by Jermaine Dupri, Jagged Edge and Da Brat. Xscape never appeared in the video. Brief clips from Big Momma's House are also included.

== Charts ==
=== Weekly charts ===
Chart (2000–2001)	Peak position
Australia (ARIA)	48
Australian Urban (ARIA)	14
US Billboard Hot 100	20
US Hot R&B/Hip-Hop Songs (Billboard)	1
US Hot Rap Songs (Billboard)	1
US Rhythmic Airplay (Billboard)	8

=== Year-end charts ===
Chart (2000)	Position
US Billboard Hot 100	94
US Hot R&B/Hip-Hop Songs (Billboard)	22
US Hot Soundtrack Singles (Billboard)	6
