= Bow Wow (That's My Name) =

2001 single by Lil' Bow Wow featuring Snoop Dogg

Single by Lil' Bow Wow featuring Snoop Dogg

from the album Beware of Dog
- Released: October 31, 2000
- Studio: Southside (Atlanta, Georgia)
- Length: 3:44
- Label: So So Def
- Songwriters: Jermaine Mauldin; Calvin Broadus; Bryan-Michael Cox; George Clinton; Garry Shider; David Spradley
- Producer: Jermaine Dupri

Lil' Bow Wow singles chronology
"Bounce with Me" (2000)	"Bow Wow (That's My Name)" (2000)	"Puppy Love" (2001)

Snoop Dogg singles chronology
"Snoop Dogg (What's My Name Pt. 2)" (2000)	"Bow Wow (That's My Name)" (2000)	"Hennesey'n Buddah" (2001)

"Bow Wow (That's My Name)" is the second single from American rapper Lil' Bow Wow's debut album, Beware of Dog. It features fellow rapper Snoop Dogg and was released on October 31, 2000. The song peaked at number 21 on the US Billboard Hot 100 and was Bow Wow's first major international hit, becoming a top-10 hit in Australia and eight European countries, including France and the Netherlands, where it peaked at number two.

== Composition ==
"Bow Wow (That's My Name)" samples "Dernier Domicile Connu", originally recorded by François de Roubaix, and "Atomic Dog" by George Clinton.

== Music video ==
The video was shot of Los Angeles directed by Dave Meyers. Bow Wow appears in the video along with his alleged "Godfather" Snoop Dogg, Fred Durst, Chanté Moore, Moby, and his 'mentor' Jermaine Dupri. The beginning of the music video, in which students sit in a classroom during detention, is referenced in the music video of Ava Max's 2019 song "So Am I".

== Track listing ==
Maxi CD single

1. Bow Wow (That's My Name) (Track Masters remix)
2. Bow Wow (That's My Name) (Going Back to Cali remix)
3. Bow Wow (That's My Name) (radio edit)
4. Bow Wow (That's My Name) (instrumental)

The "radio edit" completely removes Snoop Dogg's rap and instead, includes a new verse. It also removes Lil' Bow Wow's mention of Snoop Dogg and Jermaine Dupri's line as well, making it a song by Lil' Bow Wow only. All versions censor profanities, including the second half of "motherfucker" in Snoop's verse, leading listeners to only hear "woof, mother-woof...the Dogg came to play".

== Charts ==
=== Weekly charts ===
Chart (2001)	Peak position
Australia (ARIA)	6
Australian Urban (ARIA)	3
Austria (Ö3 Austria Top 40)	18
Belgium (Ultratop 50 Flanders)	9
Belgium (Ultratop 50 Wallonia)	4
Canada (Nielsen SoundScan)	35
Europe (Eurochart Hot 100)	6
France (SNEP)	2
Germany (GfK)	9
Ireland (IRMA)	13
Italy (FIMI)	46
Netherlands (Dutch Top 40)	3
Netherlands (Single Top 100)	2
New Zealand (Recorded Music NZ)	17
Norway (VG-lista)	7
Scotland Singles (Official Charts)	9
Sweden (Sverigetopplistan)	5
Switzerland (Schweizer Hitparade)	4
UK Singles (Official Charts)	6
UK Hip Hop/R&B (Official Charts)	2
US Billboard Hot 100	21
US Hot R&B/Hip-Hop Songs (Billboard)	9
US Hot Rap Songs (Billboard)	1
US Rhythmic Airplay (Billboard)	14

=== Year-end charts ===
Chart (2001)	Position
Australia (ARIA)	39
Belgium (Ultratop 50 Flanders)	56
Belgium (Ultratop 50 Wallonia)	18
Canada (Nielsen SoundScan)	199
Europe (Eurochart Hot 100)	45
France (SNEP)	30
Germany (Media Control)	57
Netherlands (Dutch Top 40)	58
Netherlands (Single Top 100)	44
Sweden (Sverigetopplistan)	33
Switzerland (Schweizer Hitparade)	33
UK Singles (OCC)	130
US Hot R&B/Hip-Hop Singles & Tracks (Billboard)	62
US Hot Rap Singles (Billboard)	4
US Rhythmic Top 40 (Billboard)	62

== Certifications ==
Region	Certification	Certified units/sales
Australia (ARIA)	Platinum	70,000^{^}
Belgium (BRMA)	Gold	25,000^{*}
France (SNEP)	Gold	250,000^{*}
Sweden (GLF)	Gold	15,000^{^}
^{*} Sales figures based on certification alone.^{^} Shipments figures based on certification alone.

== Release history ==
Region	Date	Format(s)	Label(s)	Ref.
United States	October 31, 2000	Urban radio	So So Def	
United Kingdom	April 2, 2001	CD; cassette	So So Def; Columbia	
Australia	April 16, 2001	CD	So So Def; Columbia	
