= Thank You (Bow Wow song) =

Single by Lil' Bow Wow featuring Jagged Edge, Jermaine Dupri and Fundisha

from the album Doggy Bag
- Released: November 5, 2001
- Recorded: 2001
- Genre: Hip-hop; R&B
- Label: So So Def
- Songwriters: Jermaine Mauldin; Bryan-Michael Cox; Ric Ocasek
- Producers: Jermaine Dupri; Bryan-Michael Cox

Lil' Bow Wow singles chronology
"Ghetto Girls" (2001)	"Thank You" (2001)	"Take Ya Home" (2001)

Jagged Edge singles chronology
"Goodbye" (2001)	"Thank You" (2001)	"I Got It 2" (2001)

Jermaine Dupri singles chronology
"I've Got to Have It" (2000)	"Thank You" (2001)	"Ballin' Out of Control" (2001)

"Thank You" is the first single from rapper Lil' Bow Wow's second album Doggy Bag (2001). The song features Jagged Edge, Jermaine Dupri, and Fundisha. The song samples "I'm Not the One" by The Cars.

A music video was shot in Chicago, where some of his fans appeared as extras.

== Charts ==
Chart (2002)	Peak position
US Billboard Hot 100	93
US Hot R&B/Hip-Hop Songs (Billboard)	45
US Hot Rap Songs (Billboard)	21
