= Bow Wow (rapper) =

American rapper and actor (born 1987)

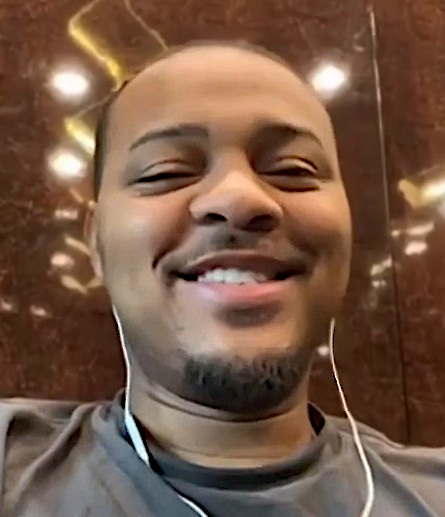
- Bow Wow in 2022

Background information
- Also known as: Lil' Bow Wow; Kid Gangsta
- Born: Shad Gregory Moss; March 9, 1987 (age 39); Columbus, Ohio, U.S.
- Genres: Pop rap; R&B
- Occupations: Rapper; singer; songwriter; actor; television presenter
- Works: Discography; filmography
- Years active: 1993–present
- Labels: LBW (current); Bad Boy; Cash Money; Republic; Sony Urban; Columbia; So So Def (former)
- Producer(s): Jermaine Dupri
- Children: 2
- Website: bwapparel.com

Shad Gregory Moss (born March 9, 1987), better known by his stage name Bow Wow (formerly Lil' Bow Wow), is an American rapper and actor. His career began upon being discovered by rapper Snoop Dogg in 1993 at the age of six; five years later, he signed with record producer Jermaine Dupri's So So Def Recordings, an imprint of Columbia Records. As Lil' Bow Wow, his debut studio album, Beware of Dog (2000), was released at the age of 13, and followed by his second album, Doggy Bag (2001). Both commercial successes, the albums peaked at numbers 8 and 11 on the Billboard 200, respectively.

Moss then parted ways with So So Def and signed with its parent label, Columbia Records, to release his third album, Unleashed (2003). It peaked at number three on the Billboard 200 and was his first release after dropping "Lil'" from his stage name. His fourth album, Wanted (2005), spawned the singles "Let Me Hold You" (featuring Omarion) and "Like You" (featuring Ciara), which peaked at numbers four and three on the Billboard Hot 100, respectively, and remain his highest-charting songs. His 2006 single, "Shortie Like Mine" (featuring Chris Brown and Johntá Austin), peaked within the chart's top ten and preceded the release of his fifth album, The Price of Fame (2006). His sixth, New Jack City II (2009), was met with trailing critical and commercial response, serving as his final album on a major label. He briefly signed with Birdman's Cash Money Records in 2009 to release a series of promotional singles—including "Ain't Thinkin' 'Bout You" (featuring Chris Brown) and "Sweat" (featuring Lil Wayne)—for his seventh album Underrated, which remains unreleased. He then signed with Puff Daddy's Bad Boy Records in 2015, and again released no projects with the label.

Moss first appeared in the 2002 film All About the Benjamins as a cameo. That same year, Moss was cast in the lead role for the sports comedy film, Like Mike. He later starred in the films Johnson Family Vacation in 2004 and Roll Bounce in 2005. He played a supporting role in the film The Fast and the Furious: Tokyo Drift in 2006, a character he reprised in F9 (2021). Moss appeared in five episodes of the television series Entourage, and starred as Brody Nelson in CSI: Cyber until the show's 2016 cancellation.

== Life and career ==
=== 1987–2001: Early life and Beware of Dog ===
Bow Wow was born Shad Gregory Moss in Columbus, Ohio, the son of Teresa Rena Caldwell (née Jones) and Alfonso Preston Moss. At age three, he became interested in rap. Under the moniker "Kid Gangsta", he began rapping recreationally at age six; he was also a fan of N.W.A at that age. In 1993, he performed at a concert in Los Angeles, and was noticed by rapper Snoop Doggy Dogg, who subsequently gave him a stage name, "Lil' Bow Wow". He then appeared on the Doggystyle album on the track, "Gz and Hustlas", and on The Arsenio Hall Show in late 1993. He also appeared in the "Gin and Juice" music video. Furthermore, he was supposed to appear on the Murder Was the Case soundtrack with the song "After 3", featuring Kurupt, Jewell, and CPO Boss Hogg, but it remained in the vault until the early 2010s. (Note: Kurupt wrote Bow Wow's verses.)

In 1998, at the age of eleven, Bow Wow met record producer Jermaine Dupri, who helped shape his career. In 1999, the soundtrack to the movie Wild Wild West featured his song "Stick Up" with Dupri. At the age of 13, in 2000, he debuted with the album Beware of Dog under the stage name Lil' Bow Wow. Its debut single was "Bounce with Me", which featured R&B girl group Xscape. The album also included "Bow Wow (That's My Name)" featuring Snoop Dogg, which topped the rap chart, "Puppy Love", and "Ghetto Girls". The Recording Industry Association of America certified Beware of Dog double platinum on March 5, 2001, signifying sales of two million copies. In a 2009 interview, the rapper claimed that the album had sold over 3 million copies since its release.

=== 2002: Doggy Bag, Like Mike and name change ===
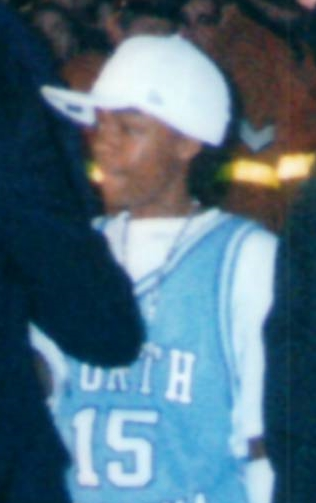
Bow Wow in 2002

In 2002, his second album Doggy Bag was released with singles "Take Ya Home" which peaked at No. 72 on the Hot 100 and No. 21 on the Hot R&B/Hip-Hop Songs chart, and "Thank You" with Jagged Edge, No. 1 on the R&B chart. Doggy Bag peaked at No. 11 on the Billboard 200 and No. 2 on the Top R&B/Hip Hop Albums chart and was certified platinum. Lil' Bow Wow performed the track "Basketball" for the soundtrack of his film Like Mike; that song peaked at No. 1 on the R&B and No. 25 on the rap chart.

Bow Wow dropped the "Lil'" from his stage name in April 2002; he told MTV News: "I changed my name because I'm getting older now and it's too many Lil's. All these Lil' rappers, I'm just kind of getting real irritated by it. I said, 'You know what? Drop the Lil'. Forget it. I'm Bow Wow. Besides, I'm growing up, I'm not little anymore. [I just decided that] two weeks ago. I really got irritable. It's all these Lil' cats, forget it. I'm Bow Wow now. Everything is just 'Bow Wow,' no 'Lil' Bow Wow.'"

=== 2003–2006: Unleashed, Wanted and The Price of Fame ===
The first album released under his new name was Unleashed in 2003. Its first single was "Let's Get Down" featuring Birdman, the founder of Cash Money Records, which reached No. 14 on the Hot 100 and No. 6 on the Hot Rap Tracks charts. The second single was then released, "My Baby", featuring Jagged Edge. Unlike his previous albums, this one was not produced under the mentorship of Jermaine Dupri. Guest appearances include Jagged Edge, Birdman, Mario, and Amerie. Unleashed was certified gold on September 25, 2003. Bow Wow appeared on the remix of JoJo's single "Baby It's You" in 2004.

Wanted was released in 2005. Its first single was "Let Me Hold You", featuring Omarion, and peaked at No. 1 on the rap chart and No. 4 on the Hot 100. The next single, "Like You", featuring Ciara, coincided with the beginning of Bow Wow's relationship with the singer. "Fresh Azimiz", featured J-Kwon and Jermaine Dupri, followed and peaked at No. 23 on the Hot 100 and No. 6 on the Hot Rap Tracks chart. The album was certified platinum. At the time of the album's release, Bow Wow was managed by Positive Management. He also appeared on the remix of Dem Franchize Boyz' "I Think They Like Me", which peaked at No. 15 on the Hot 100 and No. 1 on the Hot Rap Tracks. Bow Wow ended his relationship with Ciara in 2006.

In 2006, The Price of Fame was released with the lead single "Shortie Like Mine", featuring Chris Brown, peaking at No. 9 on the Hot 100 and No. 1 on the Hot Rap Tracks. "Outta My System", which featured T-Pain, reflected on Bow Wow's break-up with Ciara. It peaked at No. 22 on the Hot 100 and No. 2 on the Rap chart. The Price of Fame was certified gold.

=== 2007–2009: Face Off and New Jack City II ===
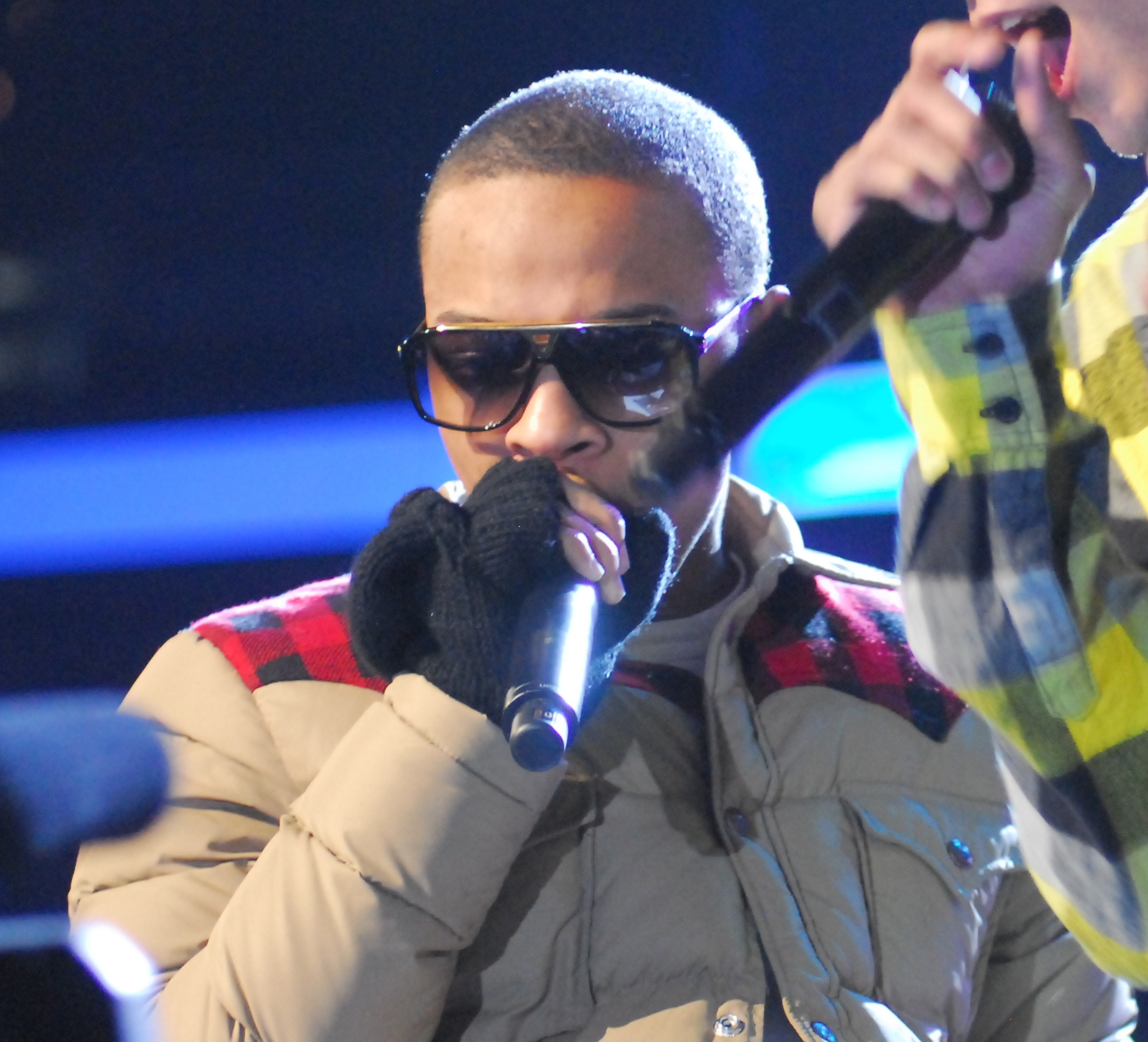
Bow Wow performing in 2009

Bow Wow and Omarion released a collaborative album on December 11, 2007, Face Off. The first single was "Girlfriend", which peaked at No. 33 on the Hot 100. The second single was "Hey Baby (Jump Off)". He released a mixtape title Half Man, Half Dog Vol. 1 that year. Half Man, Half Dog Vol. 2 was released as a sequel to the mixtape in February 2009.

New Jack City II, his sixth album, was released in March 2009 was his first album to include a Parental Advisory: Steven Roberts of MTV News observed that this album explored "the influence of crack cocaine in inner-city communities", and featured such guests as T.I.

Three promo singles were released in late 2008: "Marco Polo" featuring Soulja Boy, "Big Girls", and "Roc The Mic". The first official single, "You Can Get It All" featuring Johntá Austin, samples TLC's "Baby-Baby-Baby" and peaked at No. 55 on the Hot 100 and No. 9 on the Hot Rap Tracks. On July 4, 2009, his new song "I Know I'm The Shit" off his DJ Drama-hosted mixtape, makes a references working on his new album Underrated and that it is already in production. On August 16, Bow Wow announced his signing to Cash Money Records, joining an all-star roster that already includes Nicki Minaj, Drake, Lil Wayne and Birdman, among others.

=== 2010–present ===
Bow Wow planned to release his new then-titled album Underrated on Cash Money Records, but the record underwent a number of delays and, in mid-November 2011, Bow Wow announced on his blog that the record wouldn't be out before 2012. The album was intended to feature Birdman, Boyz II Men, Chris Brown, DJ Khaled, Fabolous, Game, Lil Wayne, Lloyd Banks, Meek Mill, Nas, Nelly, Sean Kingston, Snoop Dogg, DMX, Styles P and Talib Kweli. The first promo single being "For My Hood", featuring DJ Khaled & Sean Kingston.

On November 1, 2010, Bow Wow released his first promotional single from the album entitled "Ain't Thinkin' 'Bout You" featuring Chris Brown. The music video was a success on 106 & Park and made the countdown in just one day. Two weeks later, it peaked at No. 1 on the show's charts and remained No. 1 for three days. On June 2, 2011, a song from his album called "I'm Da Man", which features Chris Brown, was leaked and wasn't the first official single from the album. On October 24, 2011, Bow Wow released the single entitled "Sweat" featuring Lil Wayne, and though it was thought to be the first official single from the album, it was also dubbed by Bow Wow as a promotional single.

On May 18, 2012, after several delays, Bow Wow released the first single from the album titled "Better" featuring T-Pain. The music video for the song was directed by Bow Wow's personal cameraman Rico Da Crook and was a success on 106 & Park and made it to the top of the countdown. On June 26, 2012, Bow Wow released the second single from the album titled "We In Da Club" and was produced by DJ Mustard. The song went nowhere on any billboard charts, but the video was also another success on 106 & Park making it to the top of the countdown. The third single scheduled from the album was intended to feature Miguel that was titled "Right Now". Later, there was an announcement that Universal Republic Records was going defunct; all of the artists on the roster that were moved from the label, including Bow Wow, were moved to Republic Records, making the label itself revived.

On August 10, 2013, via his official YouTube page, Bow Wow stated the reason that Underrated had been delayed was the result of raising his daughter and waiting until he was more mature; he also stated he planned on working on and releasing the album after he turned 28. On June 24, 2014, Bow Wow announced via Instagram that after the 2014 BET Awards, he was going by his real name Shad Moss, claiming that he made a lot of history as Bow Wow and that it was now time for "the next chapter and challenge". He stated that "Bow Wow" no longer fit with his new personality as he was now a father, host, and actor, and he had matured from what he had been early on in his life.

In May 2015, with his long-delayed album with Cash Money still without a release date, Bow Wow announced that he had amicably parted ways with Cash Money Records so he could move on with his music career. He said, "I wanna dictate when my music come out. I'm tired of going to the studio to make records and then I listen to them. 'Cuz then they get old. Then when y'all ask for new music I don't wanna hear it 'cuz I've been listening to it for two or three months. I just can't be held up up by nobody. It's as simple as that. I got a daughter. I got a family I gotta provide for."

On September 27, 2015, Bow Wow signed to Puff Daddy's record label Bad Boy Records. He then named the members of his new management team and finished the post by writing, "Making money won't be the issue. Figuring out where to keep it all is another story!"

On August 7, 2016, Bow Wow officially announced that he was retiring from rapping and would release one more album, titled NYLTH, which was initially tentatively scheduled for release in 2017. In 2021, he announced that his final album would be titled Before 30, and would be released by Death Row Records. He teased the album again in March 2024.

Prior to his final album release, Bow Wow and Soulja Boy released a joint retail mixtape titled Ignorant Shit on October 25, 2016.

In 2020, Bow Wow competed in the third season of The Masked Singer as "Frog" and finished in third place. He agreed to appear on the show because he felt it would be a good rehearsal before headlining The Millennium Tour. He headlined the tour in 2020, 2021 and 2022.

== Other ventures ==
=== Acting career ===
Bow Wow has made guest appearances on Brandy's TV sitcom, Moesha, as well as The Steve Harvey Show and Brothers Garcia. He made his acting debut in the film Like Mike which was released on July 3, 2002, in which he starred as a young orphan who gets a shot at playing in the NBA. Before Like Mike he made cameos in All About The Benjamins and Carmen: A Hip Hopera. Bow Wow also co-starred with Cedric the Entertainer, Vanessa L. Williams, and Solange Knowles in Johnson Family Vacation. Since the success of Like Mike, Bow Wow has starred in several Hollywood films, including Roll Bounce, The Fast and the Furious: Tokyo Drift and Hurricane Season.

He has also made guest appearances on Smallville and Ugly Betty. He was part of the cast of the fifth season of HBO's Entourage, playing Charlie an up-and-coming comedian, and Eric Murphy's newest client. He starred in a 2010 comedy film, Lottery Ticket, with Ice Cube. A documentary about his life titled Who Is Shad Moss? was released in 2011. Bow Wow stated that the documentary goes all the way back to when he was on Death Row Records.

Bow Wow starred in the film version of Madea's Big Happy Family, released in April 2011. In August 2014, Bow Wow announced that he would star in a CSI spinoff titled CSI: Cyber. In 2021, he reprised his role as Twinkie in F9.

=== BET's 106 & Park ===
On October 1, 2013, it was confirmed that Bow Wow was chosen to host for BET's 106 & Park after former hosts Terrence J and Rocsi retired from the show, it was seen in over 85 million homes in the U.S., Canada, Japan, United Kingdom, Africa, the Caribbean, and Germany until its cancellation in 2014.

=== RnB Friday Nights ===
In 2016, Bow Wow began hosting a nighttime edition of the Australian Hit Network's radio show RnB Fridays, titled RnB Friday Nights.

=== Business ===
In 2018, Bow Wow partnered with hair grooming company Red By Kiss and launched a new line of luxury durags. In 2024, Bow Wow opened up a new restaurant in Atlanta called "Prime on Peachtree."

== Legal issues ==
On March 28, 2012, it was announced that Bow Wow was ordered by a court to pay $3,000 a month in child support.

On October 2, 2012, Bow Wow claimed he was broke and only making $4,000 a month and only had $1,500 in his checking account. However, the next day he signed on to be one of the four new co-hosts of BET's 106 & Park. Later on he would address this by saying:

One thing about me, I'm a smart guy. Very smart. Things that I do, are for reasons. Things that I don't do are for reasons. So for myself, I'm comfortable, very comfortable. For me, it's all about the work. But as far as rumors, those are people's opinions -- until you see me on a corner with a cardboard box saying I'll tap dance for food or canned goods, then you can say that [I'm broke].

On February 2, 2019, Bow Wow was arrested in Atlanta, Georgia, for battery after a fight with a woman. At the time of arrest, both suffered minor injuries and it was unclear who the aggressor was, so both parties were charged. They were both taken to the Fulton County Jail, but Moss was released from jail Saturday afternoon after being held on $8,000 signature bond.

== Personal life ==
His family supported him through his choice of music as a career. Bow Wow lives in Atlanta, Georgia, along with his mother. Bow Wow has a daughter Shai Moss with Joie Chavis. Bow Wow was formerly engaged to Erica Mena. In September 2020, Bow Wow had a son with model Olivia Sky.

=== Politics ===
In October 2008, for the U.S. presidential election, Bow Wow led a 15-city "Walk Across America" event to register new voters. In 2014, during a charity flag football game organized by Chris Brown, Bow Wow participated in a celebrity tribute to Ferguson, Missouri, police-shooting victim Michael Brown.

In 2016, Bow Wow was involved in a controversy on Twitter when he told his followers that he had decided not to vote in the presidential election that year. In response to a suggestion that refusing to vote dishonors the struggle for civil rights in the United States, Moss said that he did not identify with the fight for civil rights because his heritage was "mixed" and not exclusively black.

On March 15, 2017, Bow Wow, responding to President Donald Trump's criticism of Snoop Dogg's music video for "Lavender (Nightfall Remix)", sent a tweet to Trump in which he threatened to "pimp your wife and make her work for us". In less than 24 hours, Bow Wow deleted the tweet.

== Discography ==
Studio albums

- Beware of Dog (2000)
- Doggy Bag (2001)
- Unleashed (2003)
- Wanted (2005)
- The Price of Fame (2006)
- New Jack City II (2009)

Collaboration albums

- Face Off with Omarion (2007)

== Filmography ==
=== Film ===
Year	Title	Role	Notes
2001	Carmen: A Hip Hopera	Jalil	
2002	All About the Benjamins	Kelly	
2002	Like Mike	Calvin Cambridge	
2004	Johnson Family Vacation	Divirnius James "D.J." Johnson	
2005	Roll Bounce	Xavier "X" Smith	
2006	The Fast and the Furious: Tokyo Drift	Twinkie	
2009	Hurricane Season	Gary Davis	
2010	Lottery Ticket	Kevin Carson	
2011	Madea's Big Happy Family	Byron	
2011	The Family Tree	T-Boy	
2012	Allegiance	Specialist Chris Reyes	
2013	Scary Movie 5	Eric	
2019	In Broad Daylight	Malik Boudreaux	TV movie
2021	F9	Twinkie	
2022	Hip Hop Family Christmas Wedding	Mega	TV movie

=== Television ===
Year	Title	Role	Notes
2000	Soul Train	Himself	Episode: "Rachelle Ferrell/Changing Faces/Lil Bow Wow Featuring Jermaine Dupri"
2001	Showtime at the Apollo	Himself	Episode: "Lil' Bow Wow/Freddie Ricks"
2001	E! True Hollywood Story	Himself	Episode: "Joan Rivers"
2001	Live & Kicking	Himself	Episode: "Episode 8.25"
2001	The Steve Harvey Show	Himself	Episode: "No Free Samples"
2001	Moesha	Ray-Ray	Episode: "That's My Mama"
2002	Soul Train	Himself	Episode: "Bow Wow/Raphael Saadiq/Lady May Featuring Blu Cantrell"
2003	Exposed	Himself	Episode: "Bow Wow"
2003	Punk'd	Himself	Episode: "Episode 2.2" & "2.4"
2004	All That	Himself	Episode: "Bow Wow"
2005	My Super Sweet 16	Himself	Episode: "Sierra"
2006	Smallville	Baern	Episode: "Fallout"
2007	Access Granted	Himself	Recurring Guest
2008	My Super Sweet 16	Himself	Episode: "Bow Wow"
2008	Ugly Betty	Himself	Episode: "Zero Worship"
2008	Entourage	Charlie	Recurring Cast: Season 5, Guest: Season 6
2009	E.S.L.: Entertainment as a Second Language	Himself	Episode: "Bow Wow/Carlos Camacho y Mas!"
2010	Kourtney and Kim Take Miami	Himself	Episode: "Back in Miami"
2011–12	The Secret Life of the American Teenager	Dante	Episode: "4-1-1" & "Smokin Like a Virgin"
2012–14	106 & Park	Himself/Host	Main Host: Seasons 9–10
2013	Real Husbands of Hollywood	Himself	Episode: "Outdated"
2015–16	CSI: Cyber	Brody "Baby Face" Nelson	Main Cast
2017–21	Growing Up Hip Hop: Atlanta	Himself	Main Cast
2018	The Hollywood Puppet Show	Himself	Episode: "Marlon Wayans and Bow Wow"
2019	Ridiculousness	Himself	Episode: "Bow Wow"
2020	The Masked Singer	Himself/Frog	Contestant: Season 3
2020	Growing Up Hip Hop	Himself	Episode: "Sit Down, Throne Down"
2022	I Can See Your Voice	Himself/Panelist	Episode: "Episode 1: Jewel, Bow Wow, Cheyenne Jackson, Cheryl Hines, Adrienne Houghton"
2022	After Happily Ever After	Himself/Host	Main Host
2022	All Elite Wrestling	Himself	Episode: "Thanksgiving Eve"
2023	Celebrity Game Face	Himself	Episode: "Real Heavy Hitters of Hollywood"

=== Documentary ===
Year	Title	Role
2011	Who Is Shad Moss?	Himself

== Awards and nominations ==
BET Awards

- 2001, Viewer's Choice "Bow Wow (That's My Name)" (Won)
- 2006, Best Collaboration "Like You" (with Ciara) (Nominated)
- 2007, Viewer's Choice "Shortie Like Mine" (with Chris Brown) (Nominated)

Billboard Music Awards

- 2001, Rap Single of the Year "Bow Wow (That's My Name)" (Won)

Billboard R&B/Hip-Hop Awards

- 2004, Top R&B/Hip-Hop Singles – Sales "Let's Get Down" (with Baby) (Nominated)
- 2006, Hot Rap Track "Like You" (with Ciara) (Nominated)

Black Reel Awards

- 2003, Best Breakthrough Performance – Viewer's Choice: Like Mike (Nominated)

MTV Video Music Awards Japan

- 2006, Best Collaboration "Let Me Hold You" (with Omarion) (Nominated)

NAACP Image Awards

- 2008, Outstanding Duo or Group (with Omarion) (Nominated)

Nickelodeon Kids' Choice Awards

- 2001, Favorite Male Singer (Won)
- 2006, Favorite Male Singer (Nominated)
- 2008, Favorite Male Singer (Nominated)

Soul Train Music Awards

- 2001, Best R&B/Soul or Rap New Artist "Bounce with Me" (with Xscape) (Nominated)

Teen Choice Awards

- 2007, Choice Music: Male Artist (Nominated)
- 2008, Choice Music: R&B Track "Hey Baby (Jump Off)" (with Omarion) (Nominated)
- 2009, Choice Music: Rap Artist (Nominated)

Vibe Awards

- 2005, Coolest Collabo "Like You" (with Ciara) (Nominated)

Young Artist Awards

- 2003, Best Performance in a Feature Film – Leading Young Actor: Like Mike (Nominated)
