= Like Mike =

2002 American sports comedy film

- Theatrical release poster
- Directed by: John Schultz
- Written by: Michael Elliot; Jordan Moffet
- Story by: Michael Elliot
- Produced by: Barry Josephson; Peter Heller
- Starring: Lil' Bow Wow; Morris Chestnut; Jonathan Lipnicki; Robert Forster; Crispin Glover; Eugene Levy
- Cinematography: Shawn Maurer
- Edited by: Peter E. Berger; John Pace
- Music by: Richard Gibbs
- Production companies: NBA Entertainment; Heller Highwater Productions; Josephson Entertainment
- Distributed by: 20th Century Fox
- Release date: July 3, 2002
- Running time: 99 minutes
- Country: United States
- Language: English
- Budget: $30 million
- Box office: $62.3 million

Like Mike is a 2002 American sports comedy film directed by John Schultz and written by Michael Elliot and Jordan Moffet. Starring Lil' Bow Wow, Morris Chestnut, Jonathan Lipnicki, Brenda Song, Robert Forster, Crispin Glover, and Eugene Levy, the film follows an orphan who gets basketball talents after finding an old pair of sneakers that once belonged to Michael Jordan.

It was produced by NBA Productions, and features cameo appearances by NBA players. The film was released on July 3, 2002, by 20th Century Fox, three years after Jordan left the Chicago Bulls, one year before Jordan retired for the third (and last) time from the NBA, and during his playing career with the Washington Wizards (Jordan's first retirement was 1993).

Like Mike received mixed reviews from critics. In later years, the film became a fan favorite among basketball fans.

== Plot ==
A young teen named Calvin Cambridge and his two best friends, Murph and Reg Stevens, live in an orphanage in Los Angeles. At night, they sell chocolate for the unscrupulous orphanage director, Stan Bittleman, outside the STAPLES Center after home games of the NBA's Los Angeles Knights (an analog of the Los Angeles Clippers). Calvin meets the team's coach, Wagner, who is impressed by Calvin's basketball knowledge and honesty, and gives him tickets to the next game. Back at the orphanage, Calvin pulls a pair of worn sneakers from a box of donated clothes; the faded initials "MJ" are written on the tongue, indicating they once belonged to Michael Jordan. A jealous bully, Ox, steals the sneakers and throws them onto an overhead power line. During a rainstorm that night, Calvin climbs to retrieve them, and both he and the shoes are struck by lightning.

The next day, Calvin and his friends attend the game between the Knights and the Minnesota Timberwolves. During a halftime promotion, Calvin's ticket number is called to play one-on-one against the Knights' star player, Tracy Reynolds. Calvin finishes the contest with a surprising slam dunk off the backboard, earning a standing ovation from the crowd. He is summarily signed to a one-day contract as a publicity stunt, and Wagner appoints a reluctant Tracy to serve as Calvin's roommate and mentor on the road.

Examining the sneakers afterward, Calvin determines that the lightning strike imbued the shoes with Jordan's basketball prowess, granting him superhuman athleticism and NBA-level skills whenever he wears them—a secret he shares only with Murph and Reg. Late one night on a road trip, Tracy accidentally takes sleeping medication instead of painkillers and falls asleep at the wheel, forcing Calvin to drive the car back to the hotel so Tracy will not be suspended for breaking curfew. Although Calvin is benched for joyriding, Tracy warms up to him and the two form a bond.

When the Knights are losing badly to the San Antonio Spurs, Wagner puts Calvin into the fourth quarter. Powered by the sneakers, Calvin leads a dramatic comeback victory, earning a season-long contract and transforming the Knights into playoff contenders.

Bittleman subsequently signs a contract with the Knights entitling him to Calvin's earnings until Calvin comes of age or is adopted. When adoption becomes a real possibility, a desperate Bittleman steals Calvin's sneakers and bets $100,000 with local bookies on the Toronto Raptors to defeat the Knights in their final regular-season game. After the kids convince Ox and his cohorts that Bittleman is exploiting them, Ox steals the shoes back from Bittleman's safe, and the kids rush to the arena while Bittleman sends goons after them in a failed attempt to recover the sneakers.

By the end of the third quarter, Vince Carter and the Raptors lead the Knights, 80–59. Calvin arrives with the shoes, and the team convinces Wagner to let him play despite his tardiness, sparking a rally. Following a late-game pile-on, Calvin's shoes are torn apart and lose their power with the Knights trailing, 103–102. Without the shoes—and ready to be a normal kid again—Calvin admits the truth to the team and announces this will be his final game. On the final play, Calvin executes a pump fake that gets Carter into the air, passing to Tracy for the buzzer-beating shot to win, 104–103, clinching the Knights' first playoff berth.

After the game, Bittleman flees the arena in a panic over his unpaid gambling debt and abandons the orphanage. Reg is adopted by a wealthy couple. Tracy surprises Calvin and Murph with adoption papers of his own, and the Knights become a financial sponsor of the orphanage.

== Cast ==
- Bow Wow as Calvin Cambridge
- Morris Chestnut as Tracy Reynolds, Calvin's adoptive father
- Jonathan Lipnicki as Murph, Calvin's friend and adoptive brother
- Robert Forster as Coach Wagner
- Crispin Glover as Stan Bittleman
- Anne Meara as Sister Theresa
- Eugene Levy as Frank Bernard
- Brenda Song as Reg Stevens, Calvin & Murph's female friend
- Jesse Plemons as Ox
- Tucker Smallwood as Mr. Reynolds, Tracy's father
- Vanessa Williams as Pharmacist
- Timon Kyle Durrett as Henderson
- Julius Charles Ritter as Marlon
- Fred Armisen as New Age Dad
- Julie Brown as New Age Mom
- Reginald VelJohnson as Mr. Boyd
- Valarie Pettiford as Mrs. Boyd
- Reggie Theus and Geoff Witcher as the Knights Announcers
- Roger Morrissey as Marvin Joad
- Sandra Prosper as Janet

=== NBA players ===
- Vince Carter
- Michael Finley
- Steve Francis
- Jason Hart
- Allen Iverson
- Jason Kidd
- Desmond Mason
- Alonzo Mourning
- Tracy McGrady
- Steve Nash
- Dirk Nowitzki
- Robert Pack
- Gary Payton
- Jason Richardson
- David Robinson
- Gerald Wallace
- Rasheed Wallace
- Chris Webber

=== NBA reporters ===
- Tom Tolbert
- Hannah Storm
- Ahmad Rashad
- Kenny Mayne
- Rich Eisen
- Pat Croce

== Reception ==
=== Box office ===
Like Mike grossed $51.4 million in North America and $10.8 million overseas for a total worldwide gross of $62.3 million, against its budget of $30 million. The film opened fifth at the box office with a three-day gross of $12.2 million from 2,410 theaters, and $19 million over its five-day opening. The film was released in the United Kingdom on December 13, 2002, and opened on #4 with £246,169.

=== Critical response ===
On Rotten Tomatoes, Like Mike has an approval rating of 57% based on 97 reviews, and an average rating of 5.5/10. The site's critical consensus reads, "A pleasant and innocuous diversion for kids, but adults may have trouble sitting through its predictable plotlines and schmaltz." On Metacritic, it has a score of 47 out of 100, based on 27 critics, indicating "mixed or average" reviews. Audiences polled by CinemaScore gave the film an average grade of "A" on an A+ to F scale.

Ann Hornaday of The Washington Post wrote that the film depicted "frightening myths about adoption" that ultimately soured the comedy and acting chemistry between Bow Wow and Morris Chestnut.

== Post-release ==
=== Standalone sequel ===
A direct to video stand-alone sequel titled Like Mike 2: Streetball was released on June 6, 2006.

=== Direct sequel ===
In September 2021, Bow Wow confirmed that a direct sequel to Like Mike was in the works with the film's original writer, Michael Elliot.

== See also ==
- List of basketball films
