= Jermaine Dupri production discography =

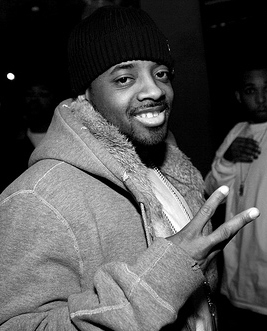
Dupri in 2005

The following list is a discography of production by Jermaine Dupri, an American record producer and recording artist. It includes a list of songs produced, co-produced and remixed by year, album, artist and title.

== Singles produced ==
Year	Song	Peak chart positions				Album
Year	Song	US	US R&B	US Rap	UK	Album
1992	"Jump" (Kris Kross)	1	1	2	2	Totally Krossed Out
1992	"Warm It Up" (Kris Kross)	14	13	5	1	Totally Krossed Out
1992	"I Missed the Bus" (Kris Kross)	—	63	—	14	Totally Krossed Out
1993	"It's a Shame" (Kris Kross)	31	—	55	11	Totally Krossed Out
1993	"Alright" (Kris Kross); Produced And Written By Jermaine Dupri	—	19	8	1	Da Bomb
1993	"Just Kickin' It" (Xscape); Produced By Jermaine Dupri	2	1	-	-	Hummin' Comin' at 'Cha
1993	"I'm Real" (Kris Kross); Produced And Written By Jermaine Dupri	84	-	8	-	Da Bomb
1994	"Da Bomb" (Kris Kross featuring Da Brat); Produced And Written By Jermaine Dupri	-	-	-	25	Da Bomb
1994	"Understanding" (Xscape); Produced By Jermaine Dupri	8	1	-	-	Hummin' Comin' at 'Cha
1994	"Love on My Mind" (Xscape); Produced By Jermaine Dupri	46	16	-	-	Hummin' Comin' at 'Cha
1994	"Tonight" (Xscape); Produced By Jermaine Dupri	-	59	-	-	Hummin' Comin' at 'Cha
1994	"Funkdafied" (Da Brat); Produced By Jermaine Dupri	6	6	1	-	Funkdafied
1994	"Fa All Y'all" (Da Brat); Produced By Jermaine Dupri	37	18	5	-	Funkdafied
1995	"Give It 2 You" (Da Brat); Produced By Jermaine Dupri	87	27	3	-	Funkdafied
1995	"Tonite's tha Night" (Kris Kross featuring Trey Lorenz); Produced And Written By Jermaine Dupri	12	-	1	-	Young, Rich & Dangerous
1996	"Live and Die for Hip Hop" (Kris Kross featuring Aaliyah, Da Brat, Jermaine Dupri & Mr. Black); Produced And Written By Jermaine Dupri	72	-	11	-	Young, Rich & Dangerous
1996	"Always Be My Baby" (Mariah Carey) Produced by Mariah Carey and Jermaine Dupri	1	1	-	3	Daydream
1996	"Sittin' on Top of the World" (Da Brat); Produced By Jermaine Dupri	30	18	2	-	Anuthatantrum
1997	"Ghetto Love" (Da Brat featuring T-Boz); Produced By Jermaine Dupri	16	11	4	-	Anuthatantrum
1997	"You Make Me Wanna..." (Usher); Produced By Jermaine Dupri	2	1	-	1	My Way
1998	"Nice & Slow" (Usher); Produced And Written By Jermaine Dupri	1	1	-	24	My Way
1998	"My Way" (Usher); Produced By Jermaine Dupri	2	4	-	-	My Way
1998	"Bed Time" (Usher); Produced By Jermaine Dupri	66	-	-	-	My Way
1998	"The First Night" (Monica); Produced By Jermaine Dupri	1	1	-	6	The Boy Is Mine
1999	"Get None" (Tamar featuring Jermaine Dupri and Amil)	-	59	-	-	Tamar
2000	"Bounce with Me" (Bow Wow featuring Xscape); Produced And Written By Jermaine Dupri	20	1	1	19	Beware of Dog
2000	"Bow Wow (That's My Name)" (Bow Wow featuring Snoop Dogg); Produced And Written By Jermaine Dupri	20	4	1	6	Beware of Dog
2000	"Let's Get Married" (Jagged Edge); Produced And Written By Jermaine Dupri	11	1	-	-	J.E. Heartbreak
2000	"What'chu Like" (Da Brat featuring Tyrese); Produced And Written By Jermaine Dupri	26	9	11	-	Unrestricted
2001	"Puppy Love" (Bow Wow featuring Jagged Edge); Produced By Jermaine Dupri	75	27	-	123	Beware of Dog
2001	"Ghetto Girls" (Bow Wow); Produced By Jermaine Dupri	91	40	14	80	Beware of Dog
2001	"U Got It Bad" (Usher); Produced By Jermaine Dupri	1	1		5	8701
2001	"U-Turn" (Usher); Produced And Written By Jermaine Dupri	-	-	-	16	8701
2001	"Where the Party At" (Jagged Edge); Produced And Written By Jermaine Dupri	3	1	-	25	Jagged Little Thrill
2002	"Thank You" (Bow Wow featuring Fundisha & Jagged Edge); Produced By Jermaine Dupri	93	45	21	43	Doggy Bag
2002	"Take Ya Home" (Lil' Bow Wow); Co-Produced And Written By Jermaine Dupri	72	21	-	61	Doggy Bag
2002	"Basketball" (Lil' Bow Wow featuring Fabolous & Jermaine Dupri); Produced And Written By Jermaine Dupri	-	44	25	125	Like Mike Soundtrack
2002	"Too Hood" (Monica); Produced By Jermaine Dupri	-	111	-	-	All Eyez on Me
2002	"Welcome to Atlanta" (Jermaine Dupri featuring Ludacris); Produced By Jermaine Dupri	35	15	3	-	Instructions and Word of Mouf
2003	"Wat Da Hook Gon Be" (Murphy Lee featuring Jermaine Dupri); Produced And Written By Jermaine Dupri	-	-	-	-	Murphy's Law
2003	"My Baby" (Bow Wow featuring Jagged Edge); Produced And Written By Jermaine Dupri	42	17	15	42	Unleashed
2004	"U Should've Known Better" (Monica); Produced By Jermaine Dupri	19	6	-	-	After the Storm
2004	"Burn" (Usher); Produced And Written By Jermaine Dupri	1	1	-	1	Confessions
2004	"Confessions Part II" (Usher); Produced And Co-Written By Jermaine Dupri	1	1	-	5	Confessions
2004	"My Boo" (Usher Duet With Alicia Keys); Produced And Written By Jermaine Dupri	1	1	-	5	Confessions
2005	"Let Me Hold You" (Bow Wow featuring Omarion); Produced And Written By Jermaine Dupri & No I.D.	4	2	1	27	Wanted
2005	"Like You" (Bow Wow featuring Ciara); Produced And Written By Jermaine Dupri	3	1	1	17	Wanted
2005	"Fresh Azimiz" (Bow Wow featuring J-Kwon & Jermaine Dupri); Produced And Written By Jermaine Dupri	23	13	6	21	Wanted
2005	"It's like That (Mariah Carey); Produced And Written By Jermaine Dupri	16	17	-	4	The Emancipation of Mimi
2005	"We Belong Together (Mariah Carey); Produced And Written By Jermaine Dupri	1	1	-	2	The Emancipation of Mimi
2005	"Shake It Off (Mariah Carey); Produced And Written By Jermaine Dupri	2	2	-	9	The Emancipation of Mimi
2005	"Get Your Number (Mariah Carey Featuring Jermaine Dupri); Produced And Written By Jermaine Dupri	-	-	-	9	The Emancipation of Mimi
2005	"Don't Forget About Us (Mariah Carey); Produced And Written By Jermaine Dupri	1	1	-	11	The Emancipation of Mimi
2005	"Grillz" (Nelly featuring Paul Wall and Ali & Gipp); Produced And Written By Jermaine Dupri	1	2	1	24	Sweatsuit
2005	"I Think They Like Me So So Def Remix" (Dem Franchize Boyz featuring Jermaine Dupri, Da Brat and Bow Wow); Produced And Written By Jermaine Dupri	15	1	1	-	On Top of Our Game
2006	"Call on Me" (Janet Jackson featuring Nelly); Produced By Jermaine Dupri	25	1	-	18	20 Y.O.
2006	"Control Myself" (LL Cool J featuring Jennifer Lopez); Produced By Jermaine Dupri	4	28	9	2	Todd Smith
2006	"Feelin' You" (3LW featuring Jermaine Dupri); Produced and Written by Jermaine Dupri	-	-	-	-	Point of No Return
2006	"Everytime Tha Beat Drop" (Monica featuring Dem Franchize Boyz); Produced By Jermaine Dupri	48	11	-	-	The Makings of Me
2006	"Pullin' Me Back" (Chingy featuring Tyrese); Produced By Jermaine Dupri	9	1	1	44	Hoodstar
2006	"Shortie Like Mine" (Bow Wow featuring Chris Brown); Produced By Jermaine Dupri	9	2	1		The Price of Fame
2007	"Outta My System" (Bow Wow) featuring T-Pain and Johntá Austin; Produced By Jermaine Dupri	22	12	2	-	The Price of Fame
2007	"Baby Don't Go" (Fabolous) featuring Jermaine Dupri and T-Pain; Produced By Jermaine Dupri	23	23	4	-	From Nothin' to Somethin'
2010	"Love All Over Me" (Monica); Produced By Jermaine Dupri	58	2	-	-	Still Standing
2021	"Pressure" (Ari Lennox); Produced by Jermaine Dupri	58	2	-	-	Age/Sex/Location
2023	"Made for Me" (Muni Long); Produced by Jermaine Dupri	20	8	-	36	PDA2
Number-one songs		11	16	11	5	Total = 43
Top-ten hits		20	24	18	16	Total = 78
Top-forty hits		33	40	25	28	Total = 123
Total on the chart		44	45	25	34	Total Singles = 148

== 1990–1997 ==
Year	Artist	Album	Songs	Role	Record labels
1990	Silk Tymes Leather	It Ain't Where Ya From...It's Where Ya At	1 - "Intro/It Ain't Where Ya From"; 2 - "I Ain't Going Out"; 3 - "That's How It Is"; 4 - "The Woman In Me"; 5 - "The Rhyme Goes On"; 6 - "New Jack Thang"; 7 - "Life Story"; 8 - "Taking No Shorts"; 9 - "T.S.U."; 10 - "Do Your Dance (Work It Out)"; 11 - "I Like It Funky"; 12 - "Ill Tip/Outro"	Keyboards, drum programming, writer, producer	Geffen
1992	Immature	On Our Worst Behavior	12 - "Tear It Up (On Our Worst Behavior)"	Keyboards, programming, producer, rap, mixing	Virgin
1992	TLC	Ooooooohhh... On the TLC Tip	10 - "Bad By Myself"	Arranger, programming, producer, Vocal (background), Arrangement, Mixing	La Face
1992	Kris Kross	Totally Krossed Out	01 - "Intro"; 02 - "Jump"; 03 - "Lil' Boys in da Hood"; 04 - "Warm It Up"; 05 - "The Way of Rhyme"; 06 - "Party"; 07 - "We're in da House"; 08 - "A Real Bad Dream"; 09 - "It's A Shame"; 10 - "Can't Stop the Bum Rush"; 11 - "You Can't Get With This"; 12 - "I Missed the Bus"; 13 - "Outro"; 14 - "Party" (Krossed Mix); 15 - "Jump" (Extended Mix) feat. Super Cat	Bass, arranger, programming, vocals (background), Voices, Producer, Executive Producer	Ruffhouse Records
1993	Kris Kross	Da Bomb	01 - "Intro"; 02 - "Da Bomb"; 03 - "Sound Of My Hood"; 04 - "It Don't Stop" (Hip Hop Classic); 05 - "D.J. Nabs Break"; 06 - "Alright" featuring Super Cat; 07 - "I'm Real"; 08 - "2 Da Beat Ch'Yall"; 09 - "Freak Da Funk"; 10 - "A Lot 2 Live 4"; 11 - "Take Um Out"; 12 - "Alright [Extended Remix]	Arranger, producer, executive producer, mixing	Ruffhouse Records
1993	Run-D.M.C.	Down with the King	11 - "Can I Get a Witness"	Producer	Profile Records
1993	Various Artists	For Our Children: The Concert		Arranger, producer, engineer, mixing	Disney
1993	Xscape	Hummin' Comin' at 'Cha	01 - "Hummin' Comin' at 'Cha (Intro)"; 02 - "Just Kickin' It"; 03 - "Pumpin'"; 04 - "Let Me Know"; 09 - "Love on My Mind"; 10 - "Just Kickin' It" (Remix)	Piano, producer, rap, executive producer, mixing, Cover Art Concept	Columbia
1993	Various Artists	MTV Party to Go, Vol. 4		Producer	Tommy Boy
1993	Bobby Brown	Remixes N the Key of B		Remixing	MCA
1994	Shanice	21... Ways to Grow	06 - "Ace Boon Coon"	Vocals (background), Multi Instruments, Producer	Motown
1994	Da Bush Babees	Ambushed	03 - "Put It Down"; 010 - "Get On Down"	Vocals, Producer, Performer, Mixing	Reprise
1994	Da Brat	Funkdafied	01 - "Da Shit Ya Can't Fuc Wit"; 02 - "Fa All Y'all"; 03 - "Fire It Up"; 04 - "Funkdafied"; 05 - "May da Funk Be Wit 'Cha"; 06 - "Ain't No Thang"; 07 - "Come and Get Some"; 08 - "Mind Blowin'"; 09 - "Give It 2 You"	Vocals (background), Producer, Executive Producer, Mixing	Sony
1994	Mariah Carey	Never Forget You [Maxi-Single]	01 - "Never Forget You (Radio Edit)"; 02 - "Never Forget You (Extended)"; 04 - "Never Forget You (Instrumental)"	Remix Producer	Sony
1994	El DeBarge	Heart, Mind and Soul	06 - Slide	Vocals, Vocals (background), Producer	Warner Bros.
1994	Various Artists	The Mask (Original Soundtrack)		Producer	Sony
1994	TLC	CrazySexyCool	03 - "Kick Your Game"; 09 - "Intermission-Lude"; 015 - "Switch"	Arranger, programming, producer, Vocal (background), Arrangement, Mixing	La Face
1995	Various Artists	Baby-Sitters Club		Producer	Sony
1995	Various Artists	Bad Boys		Producer	Work
1995	Total	Can't You See	02 - Can't You See (So So Def Remix) Feat. Keith Murray	Remixing	Tommy Boy
1995	Xscape	Off the Hook	02 - "Feels So Good"; 03 - "Hard to Say Goodbye"; 04 - "Can't Hang"; 05 - "Who Can I Run To"; 06 - "Hip Hop Barber Shop Request Line"; 08 - "What Can I Do?"; 09 - "Do Like Lovers Do"	Keyboards, producer, executive producer, drum programming, stylist	So So Def
1995	Mariah Carey	Daydream	05 - "Always Be My Baby"; 08 - "Long Ago"; "Always Be My Baby (Mr. Dupri Mix)" - (featuring Da Brat & Xscape)	Arranger, producer, performer	Columbia
1995	Sean LeVert	Other Side	01 - "I'm Ready"; 05 - "Place to Be"; 10 - "Only You"	Arranger, drums, programming, producer, Sequencing, Keyboard	Trevel/Atlantic
1995	Various Artists	Panther	07 - Bobby Brown "Slick Partner"	Producer	Mercury
1996	Puff Johnson	Miracle	03 - "All Over Your Face"; 07 - "All Because of You"	Producer	Sony
1996	Da Brat	Anuthatantrum	01 - "Anuthatantrum"; 02 - "My Beliefs"; 03 - "Sittin' on Top of the World"; 04 - "Let's All Get High"; 06 - "Just a Little Bit More"; 07 - "Keepin' It Live"; 09 - "Lyrical Molestation"; 10 - "Live It Up"; 11 - "Make It Happen"	Producer, executive producer, mixing	Columbia
1996	MC Lyte	Bad As I Wanna B	01 - "Keep On, Keepin' On"; 02 - "Have U Ever"; 03 - "Everyday"; 05 - "TRG (The Rap Game)"; 07 - "Zodiac"; 09 - "Keep On, Keepin' On (Remix)"	Producer, executive producer, mixing	Eastwest
1996	Lil' Kim	Hard Core	13 - "Not Tonight"	Producer, engineer, vocals (background)	Undeas/Big Beat
1996	Various Artists	High School High	The Braxtons - "So Many Ways"	Producer, mixing	Big Beat
1996	New Edition	Home Again	04 - "Tighten It Up"; 05 - "Shop Around"	Producer, mixing	MCA
1996	Johnny Gill	Let's Get the Mood Right	11 - "Love U Right"	Producer	Motown
1996	Simbi Khali	Simbi Khali	05 - "Let Me Get Down with You"	Producer	Capitol
1996	Aaliyah	One in a Million	11 - "I Gotcha' Back"	Producer, mixing	Blackground
1996	Richie Rich	Seasoned Veteran		Producer, mixing	Def Jam
1996	Whodini	Six	02 - "Runnin’ ’Em" featuring The Lost Boyz; 06 - Keep Running Back" featuring Trey Lorenz; 10 - "VIP" featuring Mr. Black; 13 - "Keep Running Back" (Remix)	Producer, mixing	So So Def/Columbia
1996	The Braxtons	So Many Ways	01 - "So Many Ways"; 06 - "Take Home To Momma"	Producer, mixing	Atlantic
1996	Various Artists	So So Def Bass All-Stars		Executive Producer	So So Def/Columbia
1996	Various Artists	Sunset Park	MC Lyte featuring Xscape - "Keep On Keepin' On"	Producer, mixing	Elektra
1996	Kino Watson	True 2 the Game	02 - "Game Recognize Game (Whatcha Want)"	Producer, mixing	Columbia
1996	Various Artists	Twelve Soulful Nights of Christmas, Pt. 1		Executive Producer	Sony
1996	Kris Kross	Young, Rich & Dangerous	01 - "Some Cut It Up"; 02 - "When the Homies Show Up"; 03 - "Tonite's tha Night"; 04 - "Interview"; 05 - "Young, Rich and Dangerous"; 06 - "Live and Die for Hip Hop" featuring Da Brat, Aaliyah, Jermaine Dupri & Mr. Black; 08 - "It's a Group Thang"; 09 - "Mackin' Ain't Easy"; 10 - "Da Streets Ain't Right"; 11 - "Hey Sexy" Featuring (Chris Terry); 12 - "Tonite's tha Nite (remix)" feat. Redman	Vocals (background), Producer, Executive Producer	Ruffhouse/Columbia

== 1993 ==
=== Kris Kross - Da Bomb ===
- Entire Album

=== Xscape - Hummin' Comin' at 'Cha ===
- Entire Album except 7 + 10

=== Run-DMC - Down with the King ===
- 11.. "Can I Get a Witness?"

==== Kris Kross - 12" ====
- "Da Bomb (Remix)"

== 1994 ==
=== Da Bush Babees - Ambushed ===
- 03 - "Put It Down"
- 10 - "Get on Down"

=== Shanice - 21... Ways to Grow ===
- 06 - Ace Boon Coon

=== Da Brat - Funkdafied ===
- Entire Album

=== El DeBarge - Heart, Mind and Soul ===
- 06 - "Slide"

=== TLC - CrazySexyCool ===
- 03 - "Kick Your Game"
- 09 - "Intermission-lude"
- 15 - "Switch"

=== Various Artists - The Mask (soundtrack) ===
- 02 - "Who's That Man?" -.- Xscape

==== Da Brat - 12" ====
- "Fa All Y'all (Remix)"
- "Give It to You (Remix)"

===== Brigette McWilliams - 12" =====
- I Get the Job Done (On Top of the Pop Remix)

==== Tony!Toni!Tone! - 12" ====
- My Ex-Girlfriend (Remix)

===== Jade - 5 4 3 2 (Time Is Up!) 12" =====
- 5 4 3 2 (Laid Back 4 da Radio iMix)

==== TLC - 12" ====
- Creep (Jermaine's Jeep Mix)

== 1995 ==
=== Mariah Carey - Daydream ===
- 05 - "Always Be My Baby" / Always Be My Baby (So So Def Remix)
- 08 - "Long Ago"

=== Various Artists - Bad Boys (soundtrack) ===
- 10 - "Da B Side" -.- The Notorious B.I.G. & Da Brat

=== Xscape - Off the Hook ===
- Entire album (except 7, 12)

=== Various Artists - Hip Hop Inspired by the Black Panthers ===
- 07 - "Slick Partner" -.- Bobby Brown

=== Sean Levert - The Other Side ===
- 01 - "I'm Ready"
- 05 - "Place to Be"
- 10 - "Only You"

==== Usher - 12" ====
- Think of You (SSD Remix)

===== Ini Kamoze - 12" =====
- Listen Me Tic (Woyoi) [SSD Remix]

==== Junior M.A.F.I.A. - 12" ====
- I Need You Tonight (So So Def Remix) [feat. Aaliyah]

==== Total - 12" ====
- "Can't You See (So So Def Remix) [feat. Keith Murray]

==== Slick Rick - 12" ====
- Sittin in My Car (Def Mix)

==== Notorious B.I.G. - 12" ====
- Big Poppa (Remix)

== 1996 ==
=== Aaliyah - One in a Million ===
- 11 - "I Gotcha Back"

=== Da Brat - Anuthatantrum ===
- Entire album

=== MC Lyte - Bad As I Wanna B ===
- 01 - "Keep On Keepin' On" (featuring Xscape) {found also on Sunset Park (soundtrack)}
- 02 - "Have You Ever"
- 03 - "Everyday"
- 05 - "TRG"
- 07 - "Zodiac"
- 09 - "Keep On Keepin' On (Remix)" [featuring Xscape]

=== Lil' Kim - Hard Core ===
- 13 - "Not Tonight"

=== The Braxtons - So Many Ways ===
- 01 - "So Many Ways" {found also on High School High (soundtrack)}
- 06 - "Take Home to Mama"

=== New Edition - Home Again ===
- 04 - "Tighten It Up"
- 05 - "Shop Around"

=== Puff Johnson - Miracle ===
- 03 - "All Over Your Face"
- 07 - "All Because of You"

=== Kris Kross - Young, Rich & Dangerous ===
- Entire album (except 7, 11)

=== Kino Watson - True 2 the Game ===
- 02 - "Game Recognize Game (Watchu Want)" / GRG (WW) [Remix]

=== Johnny Gill - Let's Get the Mood Right ===
- 11 - "Love U Right"

=== Richie Rich - Seasoned Veteran ===
- 18 - "Touch Myself (Remix)" [featuring T-Boz]

=== Whodini - Six ===
- Entire album (except 5, 11)

==== Da Brat - 12" ====
- "Sittin on Top of the World (Higher Up Remix)"
- "Ghetto Love (Remix)"

===== DJ Kool - 12" =====
- "I Got Dat Feeling" (JD Remix)

===== Da Bush Babees - 12" =====
- Da Love Song (Remix)

==== Kris Kross - 12" ====
- "Tonite's the Night (Remix)"
- "Live & Die for Hip Hop (Remix)"

==== Mista - 12" ====
- "Lady (SSD Remix)

==== Regina Bell - 12" ====
- "You Make Me Feel Brand New (Mr. Dupri Mix)"

==== Total - 12" ====
- "Do You Ever Think About Us? (Remix)"

==== Donnell Jones - 12" ====
- Knock Me Off My Feet (College Park Remix)"

== 1997 ==
=== Usher - My Way ===
- 01 - "You Make Me Wanna"
- 02 - "Just Like Me" (featuring Lil' Kim)
- 03 - "Nice and Slow"
- 05 - "My Way"
- 06 - "Come Back" (featuring Jermaine Dupri)
- 09 - "One Day You'll Be Mine"
- 10 - "You Make Me Wanna" (Extended Version)

=== LSG - Levert.Sweat.Gill ===
- 04 - "Where Did I Go Wrong" (featuring Jermaine Dupri)

=== Jagged Edge - A Jagged Era ===
- 01 - "Slow Motion"
- 02 - "Addicted to Your Love"
- 03 - "I Gotta Be"
- 04 - "Wednesday Lover"
- 06 - "The Way You Talk" (featuring Da Brat)
- 08 - "I'll Be Right There" (featuring Busta Rhymes)
- 10 - "Ain't No Stoppin'"

=== Various Artists - Money Talks (soundtrack) ===
- 13. "Back in You Again (Remix)" -.- Rick James with Lil Cease

=== Mase - Harlem World ===
- 15 - "Cheat on You" (featuring Lil' Cease, Jay-Z & 112)

==== AZ - 12" ====
- "Hey AZ (So So Def Remix)" [feat. SWV]

==== Rakim - 12" ====
- "Guess Who's Back (So Def Remix?)"

==== Michael Bolton - 12" ====
- "The Best of Love (J.D. Remix)"

===== Mariah Carey - 12" =====
- "Honey (So So Def Remix)"

==== Mary J Blige - 12" ====
- "Everything (So So D Remix)"

==== Jodeci - 12" ====
- "Last Night's Letter (SSD Remix)"

==== Dru Hill - 12" ====
- "In My Bed (So Def Remix)" [feat. J.D. & Da Brat]

== 1998 ==
=== Destiny's Child - Destiny's Child ===
- 03 - "With Me Part I" (featuring Jermaine Dupri)

=== Xscape - Traces of My Lipstick ===
- 01 - "All About Me (Intro)"
- 02 - "My Little Secret"
- 04 - "Do You Know"
- 07 - "I Will"
- 13 - "All About Me (Reprise)"

=== Cam'ron - Confessions of Fire ===
- 04 - "Rockin' & Rollin'"

=== Jermaine Dupri - Life in 1472 ===
- 02 - "Money Ain't a Thang" (featuring Jay-Z) {found also on Vol. 2... Hard Knock Life}
- 04 - "Fresh" (featuring Slick Rick)
- 05 - "Sweetheart" (featuring Mariah Carey) {co-produced by Mariah Chanteuse}
- 06 - "Jazzy Hoes" (featuring 8Ball, Too Short & Mister Black)
- 07 - "Don't Hate on Me" (featuring Da Brat & Krayzie Bone)
- 08 - "Going Home with Me" (featuring Keith Sweat & ROC)
- 09 - "You Get Dealt Wit" (featuring Mase & Lil' Kim)
- 10 - "The Party Continues (video version)" [featuring Da Brat & Usher]
- 11 - "Protectors of 1472" (featuring Snoop Dogg, R.O.C. and Warren G) {co-produced by DJ Premier}
- 12 - "Lay You Down" (featuring Trina & Tamara)
- 13 - "Three the Hard Way" (featuring Mr. Black and R.O.C.) {co-produced by DJ Quik}

=== Mariah Carey - #1'S ===
- 01 - "Sweetheart" (featuring Jermaine Dupri)

=== Lord Tariq & Peter Gunz - Make It Reign ===
- 19 - "Be My Lady" (featuring Jagged Edge and Jermaine Dupri) {Hidden Bonus Track}

=== Monica - The Boy Is Mine ===
- 04 - "The First Night" / The First Night (Remix) [feat. R.O.C.]

=== Tamia - Tamia ===
- 01 - "Imagination" (featuring Jermaine Dupri)
- 07 - "Is That You?" (featuring Jermaine Dupri)

=== Kid Capri - Soundtrack to the Streets ===
- 12 - "Be Alright" (featuring Cam'Ron and Jermaine Dupri)

=== Mack 10 - The Recipe ===
- 03 - "You Ain't Seen Nothin'" (featuring Jermaine Dupri and Foxy Brown)

=== DJ Clue - The Professional ===
- 14 - "Bitch Be a Ho" (featuring Jermaine Dupri and R.O.C)

==== Will Smith - 12" ====
- "Gettin' Jiggy With It (So So Def Remix)" [feat. R.O.C.]

===== Mariah Carey - 12" =====
- "My All/Stay Awhile (So So Def Remix)"

===== Kelly Price - 12" =====
- "Secret Love (SSD Remix)"

== 1999 ==
=== Various artists - Blue Streak (soundtrack) ===
- 07. "Get Away" -.- TQ & Krayzie Bone

=== Master P - Only God Can Judge Me ===
- 20 - "Da Ballers" (featuring Jermaine Dupri)

=== Various artists - In Too Deep (soundtrack) ===
- 07 - "Keys to the Range" -.- Jagged Edge with Jermaine Dupri {found also on J.E. Heartbreak}

=== Harlem World - The Movement ===
- 15 - "We Both Frontin'" (featuring Jermaine Dupri)

=== TLC - FanMail ===
- 10 - "My Life"

=== Mariah Carey - Rainbow ===
- 04 - "How Much" (featuring Usher)

=== Cha Cha - Dear Diary ===
- 18. "Whatcha Wanna Do? (New Millennium) [Remix]

=== Various Artists - The PJs (soundtrack) ===
- 01. "It's Nothing" -.- Da Brat, R.O.C. & Jermaine Duper

=== Warren G - I Want It All ===
- 06 - "Havin' Things" (featuring Jermaine Dupri and Nate Dogg)

=== Various Artists - Wild Wild West (soundtrack) ===
- 15.- "Stick Up" -.- Lil' Bow Wow with Jermaine Dupri

==== Eric Benet with Faith Evans - 12" ====
- Georgie Porgie (SSD Remix)

== 2000 ==
=== Da Brat - Unrestricted ===
- 01.- "Intro" (featuring Millie Jackson & Twista) {co-produced with Timbaland}
- 02.- "We Ready" (featuring Jermaine Dupri & Lil Jon)
- 03.- "What'chu Like" (featuring Tyrese)
- 05.- "Fuck You"
- 06.- "Back Up" (featuring Ja Rule & Tamara Savage)
- 09.- "That's What I'm Looking For"
- 11.- "What's on Ya Mind" (featuring 22, LaTocha Scott & Trey Lorenz)
- 13.- "High Come Down" (featuring LaTocha Scott & Trey Lorenz)
- 14.- "All My Bitches"
- 15.- "Pink Lemonade"

=== Bow Wow - Beware of Dog ===
- Entire album

=== C-Murder - Trapped in Crime ===
- 05 - "How a Thug Like It" (featuring Da Brat & Jermaine Dupri)

=== Destiny's Child - Jumpin', Jumpin' 12" ===
- A3. "Jumpin', Jumpin' (So So Def Mix)" [featuring Da Brat]

=== Jagged Edge - J.E. Heartbreak ===
- 01 - "Heartbreak"
- 02 - "Did She Say"
- 04 - "What You Tryin to Do"
- 05 - "Girl Is Mine" (featuring Ja Rule & Jermaine Dupri)
- 07 - "Let's Get Married"
- 10 - "Promise"

=== Ludacris - Back for the First Time ===
- 07 - "Get Off Me" (featuring Pastor Troy)

=== Various Artists- Big Momma's House (soundtrack) ===
- 01 - "That's What I'm Looking For (Mr. Dupri Remix)" -.- Da Brat with Missy Elliott & Jermaine Dupri
- 02 - "I've Got to Have It" -.- Nas & Monica
- 04 - "Bounce with Me" -.- Lil' Bow Wow with Xscape {found also on Beware of Dog}
- 07 - "Big Momma's Theme" -.- Da Brat with Vita & Destiny's Child
- 08 - "Treated like Her" -.- LaTocha Scott with Chante Moore
- 14 - "I Still Got to Have It" -.- Nas & Monica

=== Funkmaster Flex - The Mix Tape Volume 4: 60 Minutes of Funk ===
- 15 - "Did She Say (So So Def Remix)" [featuring Jagged Edge, Jermaine Dupri, Da Brat and Bow Wow]

=== Various Artists - Brothers (soundtrack) ===
- 02 - "Lay It Down" -.- Jermaine Dupri with R.O.C. & Lil Mo

== 2001 ==
=== Various Artists- Hardball Soundtrack ===
- 01.- "Live The Life" (featuring Fundisha)
- 02.- "Hardball" (Lil' Bow Wow, Lil Wayne, Lil' Zane & Sammie)
- 04.- "Where The Party At ('01 Dupri Remix)" (featuring Jagged Edge, Lil' Bow Wow, Da Brat, Tigah & R.O.C.)
- 05.- "Insomnia" (Fundisha)
- 07.- "Ghetto" (featuring R.L.)
- 09.- "Ball Game" (Da Brat)
- 11. "Who Ya Love" (R.O.C.)
- 12. "Rest Of My Life" (Xscape)

=== Usher - 8701 ===
- 05 - "U Got It Bad"
- 06 - "If I Want To" {co-produced with Babyface}
- 07 - "I Can't Let U Go"
- 13 - "Good Ol' Ghetto"
- 14 - "U-Turn"
- 16 - "T.T.P." (International Version)

=== Run-DMC - Crown Royal ===
- 01 - "It's Over" (featuring Jermaine Dupri)
- 10 - "Let's Stay Together (Together Forever)" (featuring Jagged Edge)

=== Greg Street - 6 O'Clock Vol. 1 ===
- 02 - Somebody Better Tell 'Em (featuring Jermaine Dupri and Tigah)

=== UGK - Dirty Money ===
- 14 - "Money, Hoes & Power" (featuring Jermaine Dupri)

=== Alicia Keys - Songs in A Minor ===
- 02 - "Girlfriend"

=== Cappadonna - The Yin and the Yang ===
- 06 - "We Know" (featuring Jermaine Dupri & Da Brat)

=== Tyrese - 2000 Watts ===
- 10 - "Off the Heezy" (featuring Jermaine Dupri)

=== Jermaine Dupri - Instructions ===
- Entire album (except 14, 15)

=== Jagged Edge - Jagged Little Thrill ===
- 02 - "Where the Party At" (featuring Nelly)
- 03 - "Goodbye"
- 04 - "Cut Somethin' (featuring Ludacris)
- 07 - "I Got It" (featuring Trina)
- 12 - "Respect"

=== Bow Wow - Doggy Bag ===
- Entire album (except 3)

=== Nate Dogg - Music & Me ===
- 06 - "Your Woman Has Just Been Sighted (Ring the Alarm)" [featuring Jermaine Dupri]

== 2002 ==
=== Various Artists - Like Mike (soundtrack) ===
- 01 - "Basketball" -.- Lil' Bow Wow with Fabolous & Jermaine Dupri
- 02 - "NBA 2K2" -.- R.O.C.

=== Birdman - Birdman ===
- 12 - "How It Be" (featuring Jermaine Dupri and TQ)

=== Christina Milian - Christina Milian ===
- 07 “A Girl Like Me” (featuring Jermaine Dupri)

=== Mariah Carey - Charmbracelet ===
- 03 - "The One"
- 09 - "You Had Your Chance"
- 16 - "Miss You" (featuring Jadakiss)

=== Various Artists - Drumline (soundtrack) ===
- 02 - "Been Away" -.- Q "The Kid" with Jermaine Dupri

=== Monica - All Eyez on Me ~~shelved~~ ===
- 04 - "Too Hood" (featuring Jermaine Dupri)
- 09 - "If U Were The Girl"

=== Tyrese - I Wanna Go There ===
- 08 - "Girl I Can't Help It" (featuring Jermaine Dupri and The Kid Slim)

== 2003 ==
=== Mariah Carey - The Remixes ===
- 12 - The One (So So Def Remix) [featuring Bone Crusher]

=== Murphy Lee - Murphy's Law ===
- 09 - "Wat da Hook Gon Be" (featuring Jermaine Dupri)

=== Bone Crusher - AttenCHUN! ===
- 02 - "Never Scared (Intro)" [featuring Jermaine Dupri]

=== Da Brat - Limelite, Luv & Niteclubz ===
- 01 - "World Premiere" (featuring Jermaine Dupri, M.O.P. & Q "The Kid")
- 03 - "Ain't Got Time to Waste"
- 05 - "Who I Am"
- 07 - "Got It Poppin'"

=== Monica - After the Storm ===
- 04 - "U Should've Known Better"

=== Anthony Hamilton - Comin' From Where I'm From ===
- 01 - "Mama Knew Love"

=== Jagged Edge - Hard ===
- 04 - "Visions"
- 13 - "Shady Girl"

=== Marques Houston - MH ===
- 03 - "Pop That Booty" (featuring Jermaine Dupri)

== 2004 ==
=== J-Kwon - Hood Hop ===
- 12 - "My Enemies" (featuring Jermaine Dupri)

=== Tamia - More ===
- 04 - "Still"

=== Shawnna - Worth tha Weight ===
- 06 - "U Crazy" (featuring Jermaine Dupri)

=== Usher - Confessions ===
- "Confessions, Pt. 2 (Remix)" [ft. Kanye West, Twista, Shyne and Jermaine Dupri]

== 2005 ==
=== N2U - Issues ===
- 03 - "Baby Mama Love" - (featuring Jermaine Dupri)

=== 112 - Pleasure & Pain ===
- 11 - "The Way" - (featuring Jermaine Dupri)

=== Mariah Carey - Emancipation Of Mimi ===
- 01 - "It's Like That"
- 02 - "We Belong Together"
- 03 - "Shake It Off"
- 07 - "Get Your Number"
- 15 - "Don't Forget About Us"
- 16 - "Makin' It Last All Night (What It Do?)"

=== Bow Wow - Wanted ===
- 04 - "Fresh Azimiz" - (featuring J-Kwon and Jermaine Dupri)
- 08 - "Go - (with Jermaine Dupri)
- 09 - "Do What It Do" - (featuring Jermaine Dupri)

=== Syleena Johnson - Chapter III: The Flesh ===
- 07 - "Classic Love Song" - (featuring Jermaine Dupri)

=== Dru Hill - Hits ===
- 17 - "In My Bed" (So So Def remix) (featuring Jermaine Dupri and Da Brat)

=== Chris Brown - Chris Brown ===
- 14 - Run It! - (So So Def remix) (featuring Bow Wow and Jermaine Dupri)

=== Will Smith - Gettin' Jiggy wit It (iTunes Triple Play) ===
- 03. "Gettin' Jiggy wit It (So So Def Remix)" (featuring Jermaine Dupri, Big Pun, R.O.C., and Cam'ron)

== 2006 ==
=== Dem Franchize Boyz - On Top Of Our Game ===
- 02 - "Oh, I Think They Like Me (So So Def Remix)" (featuring Jermaine Dupri, Da Brat & Bow Wow)
- 13 - "Hidden Track: "White Tee" (Remix) (featuring Jermaine Dupri & The Kid Slim)

=== Avant - Director ===
- 15 - "G.P.S.A" "(Ghetto Public Service Announcement)" (featuring Jermaine Dupri)

=== Isley Brothers - Baby Makin' Music ===
- 04 - "Gotta Be with You" produced with Bryan-Michael Cox
- 06 - "Forever Mackin'" produced with Bryan-Michael Cox
- 09 - "Beautiful" produced with Manuel Seal

=== Monica - The Makings of Me ===
- 01 - "Everytime Tha Beat Drop" (featuring Dem Franchize Boyz)
- 04 - "Why Her"
- 09 - "Getaway"

=== Jagged Edge - Jagged Edge ===
- 03 - "So High"
- 09 - "So Amazing" (featuring Julio Voltio)

=== Donell Jones - Journey Of A Gemini ===
- 02 - "Better Start Talking" - (featuring Jermaine Dupri)

=== Chingy - Hoodstar ===
- 07 - Dem Jeans - (with Jermaine

Dupri)

- 08 - Pullin' Me Back (with Tyrese)

=== 3LW - Point of No Return ===
- 00. - "Feelin' You" (featuring Jermaine Dupri)
- 00. - "The Way I Feel About You" (featuring Bow Wow)
- 00. - "Beat of My Drum"
- 00. - "Big Girl"

=== Jagged Edge - The Hits ===
- 05 - Where the Party At (So So Def Remix) (featuring Jermaine Dupri, Da Brat, R.O.C., Bow Wow and Tigah)
- 10 - Stunnas (featuring Jermaine Dupri)

=== Janet Jackson - 20 Y.O. ===
- 02. So Excited (feat Khia)
- 03. Show Me
- 04. Get It Out Me
- 05. Do It To Me
- 06. This Body
- 07. With U
- 08. Call On Me (feat Nelly)

=== Daz Dillinger - So So Gangsta ===
- 02 - "On Some Real" (featuring Rick Ross) produced with LRoc
- 04 - "Weekend" (featuring Johntá Austin) produced with LRoc
- 06 - "Badder Than a Mutha" (featuring Avery Storm) produced with LRoc
- 10 - "All I Need"
- 11 - "The One" (featuring Jagged Edge) produced with LRoc

== 2007 ==
=== Paul Wall - Get Money, Stay True ===
- 04 - I'm Throwed - (featuring Jermaine Dupri) (Produced By Jermaine Dupri)

=== Donell Jones - "The Best Of Donell Jones" ===
- 08 - Better Start Talking - (featuring Jermaine Dupri)

=== Bone Thugs-n-Harmony - Strength & Loyalty ===
- 05 - "Lil Love" - (featuring Mariah Carey and Bow Wow) (Produced by Jermaine Dupri)

=== Jagged Edge - Baby Makin' Project ===
- 02 - "Put A Little Umph In It" (featuring Ashanti) (Produced By Jermaine Dupri & Manuel Seal)
- 05 - "Get This" (Produced By Jermaine Dupri & Manuel Seal)
- 06 - "I'll Be Damned" (Produced By Jermaine Dupri & Manuel Seal)
- 08 - "Way To Say I Love You" (Produced By Jermaine Dupri & Manuel Seal)
- 12 - "Put A Little Umph In It" (So So Def Remix) (featuring Ashanti) (Produced By Jermaine Dupri & Manuel Seal)

=== Jay-Z - American Gangster ===
- 12 - Success - (featuring Nas) (Produced By No I.D., co-produced by Jermaine Dupri)
- 13 - Fallin' - (featuring Bilal) (Produced By Jermaine Dupri, co-produced by No I.D.)

== 2008 ==
=== Mariah Carey - E=MC² ===
- 03 - "Cruise Control" (featuring Damian Marley) (Produced By Mariah Carey, Jermaine Dupri, Johnson, Damian Marley, Seal)
- 07 - "Love Story" (Produced By Mariah Carey, Jermaine Dupri, Seal)
- 09 - "Last Kiss" (Produced By Mariah Carey, Jermaine Dupri, Seal)
- 10 - "Thanx 4 Nothin'" (Produced By Mariah Carey, Jermaine Dupri, Seal)
- "Bye Bye Remix" (featuring Jay-Z) (Produced By Jermaine Dupri) (not on cd)

=== Janet Jackson - Discipline ===
- 07 - "Rock With U" (Co-produced with Eric Stanmile)
- 11 - "Never Letchu Go" (Co-produced with Manoel Seal)
- 15 - "So Much Betta" (Co-produced with Manoel Seal)
- 17 - "The One" (ft. Missy Elliott)
- 18 - "What's Your Name" (Co-produced with Manoel Seal)

=== Usher - Here I Stand ===
- 08 - "Something Special" (Co-produced with No I.D. and Manuel Seal)
- 10 - "Best Thing" (ft. Jay-Z)
- 19 - "Chivalry (Bonus Track)" (ft. Jermaine Dupri)

=== Ashanti - The Declaration ===
- 09 - "Good Good" (Produced by Ashanti, Jermaine Dupri, Manuel Seal)

=== Nelly - Brass Knuckles ===
- 09 - Stepped On My J'z (ft. Ciara)

== 2009 ==
=== Fabolous - Loso's Way ===
- 07 - "Money Goes, Honey Stay (When the Money Goes Remix)"
- 11 - "Makin Love"
- 12 - "Last Time"

=== Bow Wow - New Jack City Part 2 ===
- 02 - "What They Call Me" (featuring Nelly and Ron Browz) co-produced with LRoc
- 03 - "Roc the Mic" (featuring Jermaine Dupri) co-produced with LRoc
- 05 - "You Can Get It All" (featuring Johntá Austin) co-produced with LRoc
- 06 - "Sunshine" co-produced with LRoc
- 07 - "Like This" (featuring Johntá Austin and Dondria) co-produced with LRoc
- 09 - "I Ain't Playing" (featuring Trey Songz) co-produced with LRoc

== 2010 ==
=== Monica - Still Standing ===
- 09 - "Love All Over Me" (Produced with Bryan-Michael Cox)

=== Usher - Raymond v. Raymond ===
- 09 - "Foolin' Around"

=== Mariah Carey - Merry Christmas II You ===
- 02 - "Oh Santa!" (Produced with Bryan-Michael Cox & Mariah Carey)
- 07 - "Here Comes Santa Claus" (Produced with Bryan-Michael Cox & Mariah Carey)
- 14 - "Oh Santa (Remix)" (Produced with Bryan-Michael Cox & Mariah Carey) (iTunes pre-order bonus track)

== 2011 ==
=== Verbal - Visionair ===
- 02 - "Black Out" (featuring Lil Wayne + Namie Amuro)

== 2012 ==
=== Monica - New Life ===
- 09 - "Amazing" (Produced with Bryan-Michael Cox)

=== Brandon Hines - Non-album single ===
- "Yes You Are"

=== Leah LaBelle - Non-album single ===
- "What Do We Got To Lose"

== 2014 ==
=== Mariah Carey - Me. I Am Mariah... The Elusive Chanteuse ===
- 06 - "Make It Look Good" (Produced with Bryan-Michael Cox)
- 08 - "You Don't Know What to Do" (feat. Wale) (Produced with Bryan-Michael Cox)
- 09 - "Supernatural" (Produced with Bryan-Michael Cox)
- 13 - "One More Try" (Produced with Bryan-Michael Cox)
- 14 - "Heavenly (No Ways Tired / Can't Give Up Now)" (Produced with Bryan-Michael Cox)

=== Jagged Edge - J.E. Heartbreak 2 ===
- 03 - "Familiar" (Produced with Bryan-Michael Cox)
- 04 - "Hope" (Produced with Bryan-Michael Cox)
- 05 - "Things I Do For You" (Produced with Bryan-Michael Cox)
- 08 - "Wanna Be (Romeo)" (Produced with Bryan-Michael Cox)
- 09 - "Getting Over You" (Produced with Bryan-Michael Cox)

== 2015 ==
=== Fifth Harmony - Reflection ===
- 07 - "Like Mariah"

== 2017 ==
=== Star Cast - Season 2: Soundtrack ===
- 02. "I Want You"

== 2018 ==
=== Mariah Carey - Caution ===
- 04 - "A No No" (Produced with Carey and Shea Taylor)

== 2020 ==
=== Mariah Carey - The Rarities ===
- 06 - "One Night" - (Produced with Carey, originally recorded in 1995, but released in 2020)

== 2021 ==
=== Ari Lennox - Age/Sex/Location ===
- 04 - Pressure (Produced with Bryan Michael Cox)

== Credited produced or written singles ==
- 1989: "Do Your Dance" (Silk Tymes Leather)
- 1992: "Jump (Kriss Kross)
- 1992: "Tear It Up (On Our Worst Behavior)" (Immature)
- 1997: "You Make Me Wanna" (Usher)
- 1998: "Nice & Slow" (Usher)
- 2001: "U-Turn" (Usher)
- 2001: "Welcome to Atlanta" (Jermaine Dupri featuring Ludacris)
- 2001: "What's Going On" Artists Against Aids Worldwide
- 2003: "Wat Da Hook Gon Be" (Murphy Lee featuring Jermaine Dupri)
- 2004: "Confessions Pt 2" (Usher)
- 2004: "Burn" (Usher)
- 2005: "Let Me Hold You" (Bow Wow featuring Omarion)
- 2004: "My Boo" (Usher & Alicia Keys)
- 2005: "It's Like That" (Mariah Carey)
- 2005: "We Belong Together" (Mariah Carey)
- 2005: "Like You" (Bow Wow featuring Ciara)
- 2005: "Shake It Off" (Mariah Carey)
- 2005: "Fresh Azimiz" (Bow Wow featuring J-Kwon & Jermaine Dupri)
- 2005: "Grillz" (Nelly featuring Paul Wall, Ali & Gipp)
- 2005: "I Think They Like Me [Remix]" (Dem Franchize Boyz featuring Jermaine Dupri, Da Brat, & Bow Wow)
- 2006: "Don't Forget About Us" (Mariah Carey)
- 2006: "Ridin' Rims" (Dem Franchize Boyz)
- 2006: "Call On Me" (Janet Jackson featuring Nelly)
- 2006: "Pullin' Me Back" (Chingy featuring Tyrese)
- 2006: "So Excited" (Janet Jackson featuring Khia)
- 2006: "Dem Jeans" (Chingy featuring Jermaine Dupri)
- 2006: "Get Throwed" (Paul Wall featuring Jermaine Dupri)
- 2006: "Shortie Like Mine" (Bow Wow featuring Chris Brown)
- 2007: "Outta My System" (Bow Wow featuring T-Pain)
- 2007: "Baby Don't Go" (Fabolous featuring T-Pain)
- 2007: "Lil L.O.V.E." (Bone Thugs-N-Harmony featuring Mariah Carey & Bow Wow)
- 2008: "Rock With U" (Janet Jackson)
- 2008: "Stepped On My J'z" (Nelly featuring Jermaine Dupri & Ciara)
- 2008: "Good Good" (Ashanti)
- 2010: "Love All Over Me" (Monica)
- 2010: "Oh Santa!" (Mariah Carey)
- 2017: " I Don't" (Mariah Carey featuring YG)
