= Tonite's tha Night =

1996 single by Kris Kross

Single by Kris Kross

from the album Young, Rich & Dangerous
- Released: November 21, 1995
- Recorded: 1995
- Genre: Pop rap
- Length: 3:20
- Label: So So Def; Ruffhouse; Columbia
- Songwriters: Jermaine Mauldin; Ralph Aikens; Tyrone Crum; Keith Harrison; Robert Neal Jr.; Roger Parker; Clarence Satchell
- Producer: Jermaine Dupri

Kris Kross singles chronology
"Da Bomb" (1994)	"Tonite's tha Night" (1995)	"Live and Die for Hip Hop" (1996)

"Tonite's tha Night" is a song by American rap duo Kris Kross, released in November 1995 by So So Def, Ruffhouse and Columbia Records, as the first single from their third and final album, Young, Rich & Dangerous (1996). It is co-written and produced by Jermaine Dupri, featuring background vocals from Trey Lorenz and also has a remix that features Redman. The single was certified gold on January 17, 1996.

== History ==
The song was a success for the duo, making it to No. 9. on the US Cash Box Top 100, No. 12 on the Billboard Hot 100, No. 1 on the Hot Rap Singles, and No. 17 Rhythmic Top 40. "Tonite's tha Night" marked the fourth single for Kris Kross, after "Jump", "Warm It Up" and "Alright" to make it to No. 1 on the Hot Rap Singles. A remix was also released featuring Redman, however it did not reach any Billboard charts. The song was written and produced by Jermaine Dupri. The song contains a sample from "Riding High" by Faze-O also used by EPMD on "Please Listen To My Demo" on Unfinished Business (EPMD album) and Ghostface Killah on the song "Killa Lipstick" from The Big Doe Rehab album.

== Critical reception ==
Gil L. Robertson IV from Cash Box wrote, "This duo is back and they’re giving up a heavy dose of the urban vibe on this slow jam, which should allow them to recapture the momentum that fell off with their last release. Expect urban formats across the board to support them on their comeback."

== Track listing ==
- A-side
1. "Tonite's tha Night" (LP version)- 3:19
2. "Tonite's tha Night" feat. Redman (remix)- 3:22
3. "Da Streets Ain't Right" feat. Da Brat (LP Version)- 3:00
- B-side
1. "Tonite's tha Night" (remix instrumental)- 3:18
2. "Tonite's tha Night" (clean LP version)- 3:19
3. "Da Streets Ain't Right" (instrumental)- 3:00

== Charts ==
=== Weekly charts ===
Chart (1996)	Peak position
Australia (ARIA)	123
New Zealand (Recorded Music NZ)	11
Switzerland (Schweizer Hitparade)	48
US Billboard Hot 100	12
US Hot R&B/Hip-Hop Singles & Tracks (Billboard)	6
US Hot Rap Singles (Billboard)	1
US Rhythmic Top 40 (Billboard)	17
US Hot Dance Music/Maxi-Singles Sales (Billboard)	9
US Cash Box Top 100	9

=== Year-end charts ===
End of year chart (1996)	Position
US Billboard Hot 100	64

== Certifications ==
Region	Certification	Certified units/sales
United States (RIAA)	Gold	500,000^{^}
^{^} Shipments figures based on certification alone.
