= Alright (Kris Kross song) =

Single by Kris Kross featuring Super Cat

from the album Da Bomb
- Released: July 13, 1993
- Recorded: 1992
- Genre: Hip-hop; dancehall; reggae fusion
- Length: 4:10
- Label: Ruffhouse; Columbia
- Songwriters: Jermaine Mauldin; William Maragh; Steve Arrington; Mark Hicks; Tom Lockett; Daniel Webster; Raymond Guy Webster; Stephen Young
- Producer: Jermaine Dupri

Kris Kross singles chronology
"It's a Shame" (1993)	"Alright" (1993)	"I'm Real" (1993)

Music video
- "Alright" on YouTube

"Alright" is a song by American hip-hop duo Kris Kross, from their second album, Da Bomb (1993). The song was written and produced by Jermaine Dupri and features reggae singer Super Cat on the chorus. Sampling Slave's "Just a Touch of Love", it was officially released on July 13, 1993, by Ruffhouse and Columbia Records, as the lead single from the album. It became the album's biggest hit, peaking at number one in Portugal, and at numbers 19 and 18 on the US Billboard Hot 100 and Cash Box Top 100. It was also the duo's third single to reach the top of the Billboard Hot Rap Singles chart ("Jump" and "Warm It Up" being the first two). "Alright" also contains a diss to rival group, Da Youngstas, who had been critical of Kris Kross due to their success on the Billboard charts and the fact that they did not write their lyrics. Chris Smith AKA "Daddy Mac" responded with the lyric "I didn't come out wack I came out right, unlike them moles who choose to pass da mic", an obvious reference to Da Youngstas single "Pass da Mic". The track featured featured a music video directed by Rich Murray, who also directed the #1 MTV video for the duo's smash, "Jump". "Alright" was certified gold by the RIAA on September 14, 1993, for sales of 500,000 copies.

== Critical reception ==
Larry Flick from Billboard magazine commented, "What happens to an act when it starts getting too old to be precocious and cute? Kick as hard and adult as possible. Young men who wooed folks last year with 'Jump' are back with deeper voices and far more worldly rhymes (which reflect some of their experiences since the onset of fame). Loping, sample-happy funk environment clicks with jazzy guitars and a spirited toasting turn by Super Cat. The road to street juice is long, but duo seems ready to take it." Troy J. Augusto from Cash Box named it Pick of the Week, remarking that here, the duo "return with a much harder sound, a more street-wise theme and, yes, a more mature delivery." He added that it is a "bouncing, funky number." Tony Cross from Smash Hits gave it a score of two out of five, saying that "the lads sound like they're a couple of quavers short of a full octave."

== Track listing ==
=== A-side ===
1. "Alright" (Radio Version)- 4:04
2. "Alright" (LP Version)- 4:04

=== B-side ===
1. "Alright" (Extended Remix)- 6:01
2. "Alright" (Instrumental)- 4:04
3. "DJ Nabs Break"- 1:47

== Charts and certifications ==
=== Weekly charts ===
Chart (1993)	Peak position
Australia (ARIA)	97
Canada Retail Singles (The Record)	4
Europe (Eurochart Hot 100)	72
Europe (European Dance Radio)	13
Netherlands (Dutch Single Tip)	14
New Zealand (Recorded Music NZ)	8
Portugal (AFP)	1
UK Singles (OCC)	47
UK Dance (Music Week)	21
UK Club Chart (Music Week)	29
US Billboard Hot 100	19
US Dance Club Songs (Billboard)	40
US Dance Singles Sales (Billboard)	3
US Hot R&B/Hip-Hop Songs (Billboard)	8
US Hot Rap Songs (Billboard)	1
US Rhythmic Airplay (Billboard)	21
US Cash Box Top 100	18

=== Year-end charts ===
Chart (1993)	Position
US Billboard Hot 100	85

=== Certifications ===
Region	Certification	Certified units/sales
United States (RIAA)	Gold	500,000^{^}
^{^} Shipments figures based on certification alone.
