= My Boo (Ghost Town DJ's song) =

1996 single by Ghost Town DJ's

Single by Ghost Town DJ's
- Released: May 26, 1996
- Genre: R&B; Miami bass; Chicago house
- Length: 5:46 (album version); 4:09 (radio edit)
- Label: So So Def; Columbia
- Songwriters: Carlton Mahone; Rodney Terry
- Producers: Carlton Mahone; Rodney Terry; Lil Jon (uncredited)

Music video
- "My Boo" on YouTube

"My Boo" is the only single released by American hip-hop/Miami bass group Ghost Town DJ's. It was released in May 1996 on Jermaine Dupri's So So Def label and Columbia. The song, an invitation by a female to a male, blends R&B-style vocals over a bass beat. It was written by Carlton Mahone and Rodney Terry, with lead vocals sung by Virgo Williams. The song peaked at numbers 10 and 31 on the US Cash Box Top 100 and Billboard Hot 100 charts, and number three on the New Zealand Singles Chart during its initial release in 1996.

In 2016, "My Boo" was re-popularized by the "Running Man Challenge" and re-entered the Hot 100, achieving a new peak of number 27 twenty years after its original release. In 2022, Rolling Stone ranked it number 101 on their list of the "200 Greatest Dance Songs of All Time". The song is also included on the So So Def Bass All-Stars compilation album.

== Background ==
Originally, an artist named Akema Johnson-Day was slated to provide lead vocals for the song with Virgo Williams on background vocals; however, when a scheduling conflict prevented Akema from taking part in the production, Virgo Williams's vocals became the lead vocals. Lil Jon was an A&R director for So So Def at the time. Rodney Terry and Carl Mahone produced it, and it was the second version of the beat currently used in the song.

== Chart performance ==
"My Boo" entered the US Billboard charts on the issue dated June 15, 1996, with its number 71 debut on the Hot R&B Airplay chart, with early airplay concentrated at Southern R&B radio stations. Three weeks later, following its commercial release as a vinyl 12-inch single, it entered the Hot R&B Singles and Hot 100 charts at numbers 41 and 65, respectively. On the latter chart, where it was the highest-ranking debut of the week, nearly 85% of the single's chart points were derived from airplay, with its vinyl-only release precluding a larger contribution from sales. Though it was ultimately never released domestically in the more popular cassette and CD configurations, the single managed to peak at numbers 18 and 31 on Hot R&B Singles and the Hot 100, respectively. The song was especially popular at rhythmic radio stations, peaking at number two on the Top 40/Rhythm-Crossover chart. Abroad, the song became a major hit in New Zealand, where it rose to number three on the RIANZ Singles Chart and earned a gold certification for sales in excess of 5,000 copies.

Twenty years after the song's original chart run, a resurgence in its popularity driven by the Running Man Challenge viral meme prompted its re-entry on the charts dated May 21, 2016. On the strength of 35,000 digital download sales and 12.3 million domestic streams, "My Boo" re-entered the R&B chart, which had long since been renamed Hot R&B/Hip-Hop Songs, at number 14, and the Hot 100 at number 29, surpassing the single's initial peaks on both charts. It subsequently peaked at numbers 10 and 27, respectively.

== Music video ==
The music video for "My Boo" features a pool party. The group does not appear in the video, but Jermaine Dupri does.

== Remixes ==
In the 2004 song "I Wanna Be Your Lady" from Cam'ron, Nicole Wray, and the Diplomats' second album together on Diplomatic Immunity 2, the song was interpolated. In 2007, the song was interpolated on Pitbull and Lloyd's "Secret Admirer". In 2009, the song was sampled in the So So Def Mix of "H.A.T.E.U." by Mariah Carey. A slowed down witch house remix was released by Balam Acab in 2011. Interpolations of the song are featured in Ciara's 2013 single "Body Party". In 2016, a remix by Parx was released.

== Running Man Challenge ==
In 2016, twenty years after its initial release, "My Boo" gained notoriety through the Running Man Challenge, a viral meme in which participants filmed and shared short clips of themselves performing a dance resembling running to the song. The original videos were posted on Vine by high school students Kevin Vincent and Jeremiah Hall in Hillside, New Jersey. Inspired by Vincent and Hall's video, two players from the University of Maryland basketball program, Jared Nickens and Jaylen Brantley, filmed their own versions of the Running Man Challenge, spreading the meme.

The challenge went viral on Vine, and Vincent, Hall, Nickens and Brantley were invited to perform it on The Ellen DeGeneres Show. Many other athletes from various sports, a number of celebrities and the general public embraced the trend and produced their own takes of the dance.

== Track listings ==
- Maxi CD single (Europe)
1. "My Boo" (LP radio edit) – 4:09
2. "My Boo" (Quiet Storm radio edit) – 4:04
  - Remix by Carlton "Carl Mo" Mahone, Jr., Jonathan "Lil Jon" Smith
3. "My Boo" (Hitman's club mix) – 7:07
  - Remix by Mike "Hitman" Wilson
- 12-inch vinyl (US)
1. "My Boo" (LP version) – 5:47
2. "My Boo" (Just Da Beat club mix) – 6:25
3. "My Boo" (Quiet Storm mix) – 4:04
  - Remix by Carlton "Carl Mo" Mahone, Jr.*, Jonathan "Lil Jon" Smith
4. "My Boo" (Hitman's club mix) – 7:07
  - Remix by Mike "Hitman" Wilson
5. "My Boo" (Armand Representing Da East Mix) – 7:23
  - Remix by Armand Van Helden
6. "My Boo" (a cappella) – 4:27
- 12-inch vinyl (Europe)
1. "My Boo" (LP radio edit) – 4:09
2. "My Boo" (Quiet Storm radio edit) – 4:04
  - Remix by Carlton "Carl Mo" Mahone, Jr.*, Jonathan "Lil Jon" Smith
3. "My Boo" (Hitman's club mix) – 7:07
  - Remix by Mike "Hitman" Wilson
4. "My Boo" (LP radio edit) – 4:09
5. "My Boo" (Quiet Storm radio edit) – 4:04
  - Remix by Carlton "Carl Mo" Mahone, Jr.*, Jonathan "Lil Jon" Smith
6. "My Boo" (Hitman's club mix) – 7:07
  - Remix by Mike "Hitman" Wilson

== Charts ==
=== Weekly charts ===
Chart (1996)	Peak position
Canada Dance/Urban (RPM)	2
New Zealand (Recorded Music NZ)	3
US Billboard Hot 100	31
US Hot 100 Airplay (Billboard)	13
US Hot R&B Singles (Billboard)	18
US Hot R&B Airplay (Billboard)	8
US Maxi-Singles Sales (Billboard)	7
US Top 40/Mainstream (Billboard)	16
US Top 40/Rhythm-Crossover (Billboard)	2
US Cash Box Top 100	10

Chart (2016)	Peak position
Australia (ARIA)	26
France (SNEP)	157
New Zealand (Recorded Music NZ)	25
US Billboard Hot 100	27
US Hot R&B/Hip-Hop Songs (Billboard)	10

=== Year-end charts ===
Chart (1996)	Position
New Zealand (RIANZ)	24
US Billboard Hot 100	88
US Hot 100 Airplay (Billboard)	44
US Hot R&B Singles (Billboard)	60
US Hot R&B Airplay (Billboard)	28
US Maxi-Singles Sales (Billboard)	22
US Top 40/Mainstream (Billboard)	83
US Top 40/Rhythm-Crossover (Billboard)	8

Chart (1997)	Position
Canada Dance/Urban (RPM)	36
US Rhythmic Top 40 (Billboard)	57
US Top 40/Mainstream (Billboard)	73

Chart (2016)	Position
US Hot R&B/Hip-Hop Songs (Billboard)	75

== Certifications ==
Region	Certification	Certified units/sales
New Zealand (RMNZ)	Gold	5,000^{*}
United Kingdom (BPI) Sales since 2012	Silver	200,000^{‡}
^{*} Sales figures based on certification alone.^{‡} Sales+streaming figures based on certification alone.

== Cover versions ==
- Brooklyn-based band Friends released a cover of "My Boo" as the B-side to their single "I'm His Girl", released on October 31, 2011.
- Australian producer Flume released a cover of "My Boo" featuring American rapper Vince Staples and Australian singers Kučka, Ngaiire, and Vera Blue for Triple J's Like a Version on December 1, 2016. The cover was later released on iTunes on December 16, 2016.
- NewJeans member Hanni covered the song at the Complexcon Hong Kon 2025.
- British girlgroup FLO sampled the song in a mash up with their single "Check" during their 2025 Access All Areas Tour.

== In other media ==
The song was featured in the end credits of Friendship (2024) and plays a recurring theme in the film.
