= It's a Shame (Kris Kross song) =

1993 single by Kris Kross

Single by Kris Kross

from the album Totally Krossed Out
- Released: January 12, 1993
- Genre: Hip hop
- Length: 3:48
- Label: Ruffhouse; Columbia
- Songwriters: Jermaine Dupri; Roger Troutman
- Producer: Jermaine Dupri

Kris Kross singles chronology
"I Missed the Bus" (1992)	"It's a Shame" (1993)	"Alright" (1993)

"It's a Shame" is a song by American hip-hop duo Kris Kross, released in January 1993 by Ruffhouse and Columbia Records as the fourth and final single from their debut album, Totally Krossed Out (1992). It is the least successful of the four singles, as it did not chart on the US Billboard Hot 100. However, it did reach number 11 on the Billboard Hot Rap Singles chart and number 55 on the Hot R&B/Hip-Hop Songs chart, as well as number 31 on the UK Singles Chart. The song was written by Jermaine Dupri and Roger Troutman, and its music video was directed by Rich Murray. The group performed "It's a Shame" on numerous television shows, such as A Different World.

== Critical reception ==
Larry Flick from Billboard magazine wrote, "Preteen rap duo drops its hardest-hitting single to date. On-target rhymes about the rigors of growing up in the midst of violence and poverty take on a heavier-than-usual tone when rapped by a youngster's voice. Insinuating, scratch-happy hip-hop beats are drenched in radio-friendly synths and hand claps. Could trigger some much-needed street credibility." In his weekly UK chart commentary, James Masterton said, "Sadly this new single may do little to convince Britain that Daddy Mac and Mac Daddy are little more than novelties." A reviewer from People Magazine commented, "While the koncept may be kute, the kids sound anything but innocent as they delineate brutal urban realities".

== Track listing ==
1. "It's a Shame" (7" Remix) - 3:42
2. "It's a Shame" (Extended Remix) - 6:41
3. "Jump" (Steve Anderson Extended Remix) - 6:17
4. "Jump" (Supercat Dessork Mix) - 3:52

== Charts ==
Chart (1993)	Peak position
Belgium (Ultratop 50 Flanders)	35
Europe (Eurochart Hot 100)	86
Ireland (IRMA)	27
New Zealand (Recorded Music NZ)	19
UK Singles (Official Charts)	31
UK Dance (Music Week)	36
UK Club Chart (Music Week)	50
US Hot R&B/Hip-Hop Songs (Billboard)	55
US Hot Rap Songs (Billboard)	11
