= DJ Nabs =

American disc jockey

- Birth name: Youtha Anthony Fowler
- Born: January 4, 1969 (age 56); Durham, North Carolina, United States
- Genres: Hip hop
- Occupations: Disc jockey; producer
- Years active: 1988–present
- Labels: Columbia Records
- Website: djnabs.com

Youtha Anthony Fowler (born January 4, 1969), better known by his stage name DJ Nabs, is an American DJ and record producer. He has been part of the Atlanta hip hop scene since the late 1980s and worked with hip hop artists such as Kris Kross, Da Brat, Bow Wow, Xscape, Speech, and Trick Daddy, hosted several radio shows, and toured with Mariah Carey, Ciara and Michael Jackson. He published his compilation album In the Lab with DJ Nabs - The Live Album in 1998. Nabs founded the MAD DJ Academy, and hosted and co-created Ultimate Mad DJ Contest, an event showcasing emerging DJs.

== Life and career ==
Nabs was born on January 4, 1969, in Durham, North Carolina, United States, and grew up in the Walltown Neighborhood. He purchased the Rapper's Delight at the age of ten. He spun records at parties in 10th grade and later joined the marching band at his college, North Carolina Central University. Nabs came to Atlanta in 1988, when the local rap scene began to flourish. He started as a mix show DJ on WVEE and the resident DJ at Club Kaya's Old School Sundays.

While attending Morris Brown College, Nabs worked with a trio called Secret Society. Two of the group's members, Speech and Headliner, would eventually create Arrested Development, and Nabs would remix their song Tennessee. Through their manager, Michael Mauldin, Nabs met Mauldin's son Jermaine Dupri. He became So So Def's exclusive tour DJ for Da Brat, Bow Wow, Xscape, and Dupri. Nabs was the tour DJ and music director for Dupri's protégés, Kris Kross. It was on their global tour in the 1990s, during the apex of their popularity, that he opened for Michael Jackson.

After touring with Kris Kross for four years, Nabs made it to Hot 97.5 as the second afternoon drive personality in the station's history, hosting a popular show, "In The Lab With DJ Nabs". During this time, he introduced Ludacris to the music industry. He worked for Hot 97.5 (which would become Hot 107.9) in the mid-2000s as well.

Nabs released In The Lab With DJ Nabs - The Live Album for Columbia Records in 1998. It featured a then-unknown Ludacris, as well as live appearances by Big Daddy Kane, Wyclef Jean and Kurtis Blow. Nabs toured with Mariah Carey and Ciara.

He produced the remix for "In The Wind" (2002) by Trick Daddy, Cee-Lo, and Big Boi. Nabs released The Product & The Power mixtape compilation (2005), which was followed by Product & The Power II (2008). The film Diary of a Mad DJ was made in 2010 as a prelude to a documentary about Nabs' life, American DJ Story.

Nabs founded the MAD DJ Academy and hosted Ultimate Mad DJ Contest, an event showcasing emerging DJs, co-created by him and Michael Mauldin. He toured as a solo DJ to Taiwan, France, Turkey, Greece, and Romania. In the meantime, he started working on Boom 102.9 in Atlanta.

== Discography ==
=== Compilation album ===
In the Lab with DJ Nabs - The Live Album

In the Lab with DJ Nabs - The Live Album

Compilation album
- Released: November 3, 1998
- Recorded: August 1997 – April 1998
- Genre: Hip hop
- Length: 1:06:17
- Label: Columbia Records
- Producer: DJ Nabs; Carl-So-Lowe; Jermaine Dupri

No.	Title	Length
1.	"Intro" (feat. Nicole Harris, Shanik Mincie)	1:36
2.	"I Know You Got Soul" (feat. Eric B. & Rakim)	2:52
3.	"I Ain't No Joke" (feat. Eric B. & Rakim)	3:00
4.	"Time" (feat. Jermaine Dupri)	2:31
5.	"Ghetto Red Hot" (feat. Super Cat)	4:01
6.	"The Bridge" (feat. MC Shan)	2:09
7.	"Make the Music With Your Mouth, Biz" (feat. Biz Markie)	4:51
8.	"Nuff Respect Due/Good Times/Raw/Set It off/Got to Be Real/Warm It Up" (feat. Chic, Big Daddy Kane, Cheryl Lynn)	6:10
9.	"Pee Wee's Dance"	3:28
10.	"Party" (feat. MC Breed, Chris Kelly)	2:17
11.	"Nobody Beats the Biz" (feat. Biz Markie)	4:15
12.	"Is It You" (feat. Jagged Edge & Ludacris)	4:05
13.	"We Trying to Stay Alive/Unwind Yourself/Rapper's Delight/The Bridge Is" (feat. The Sugarhill Gang, Wyclef Jean)	7:13
14.	"Friends" (feat. Whodini)	2:52
15.	"I Got It Made" (feat. Special Ed)	2:45
16.	"Check the Rhime" (feat. A Tribe Called Quest)	2:16
17.	"Thank You"	1:03
18.	"Intro" (feat. Kurtis Blow)	3:49
19.	"DJ Nabs Scratch Blow" (feat. Kurtis Blow)	5:04
Total length:		01:06:17

=== Mixtapes ===
Year	Title
2005	The Product & The Power
2008	Product & The Power II

=== Producer ===
Title	Year	Peak chart positions			Album	Artist
Title	Year	Hot 100	Hip Hop	Rap	Album	Artist
"Japanese Eyes" "Billionaire Dreams"	1997	-	-	-	Severe Damage	DJ Hurricane
"In da Wind (Ride out mix)"	2002	70	28	16	Thug Holiday	Trick Daddy

=== Composer ===
Title	Year	Album	Artist
"D.J. Nabs Break"	1993	Da Bomb	Kris Kross
"Koochie Kuters"	1996	So So Def Bass All-Stars	various
"Japanese Eyes" "Billionaire Dreams"	1997	Severe Damage	DJ Hurricane
"Last of a Dying Breed" "I Do It For Hip Hop" (as Youtha Fowler)	2008	Theater of the Mind	Ludacris

=== Remixes ===
Title	Year	Artist
"Tennessee (Back to The Roots Remix)"	1992	Arrested Development
"Everyday Thang In Da Hood (DJ Nabs Remix)"	1994	Ghetto Mafia
"Ice Box (DJ Nabs Remix)"	2006	Omarion

=== Turntables ===
Year	Song	Album	Artist
1994	"Funkdafied (DJ Club Mix - Rated R)"	-	Da Brat
1995	"Stop to Think" "Reality"	Wild Seed--Wild Flower	Dionne Farris
1996	"Hopelessly"	Speech	Speech
2000	"Get Um Crunk"	Dirty South	Rasheeda
2006	"Ultimate Satisfaction"	Release Therapy	Ludacris
2010	"I Do It All Night"	Battle Of The Sexes	Ludacris

=== Guest appearances ===
Year	Artist	Title	Album
1996	Speech	Hopelessly	Heart & Soul

== Recognition ==
DJ Nabs was honored at "Respect the DJ", an Atlanta event that showcased DJ's of various genres from Hip Hop to Top 40.

He was featured as a notable pioneer in southern rap music in the 2014 "VH1 Rock Docs ATL: The Untold Story of Atlanta's Rise in the Rap Game."

== Personal life ==
Nabs married in 2009. He participates in amateur boxing tournaments for charity.
