= List of Billboard 200 number-one albums of 1992 =

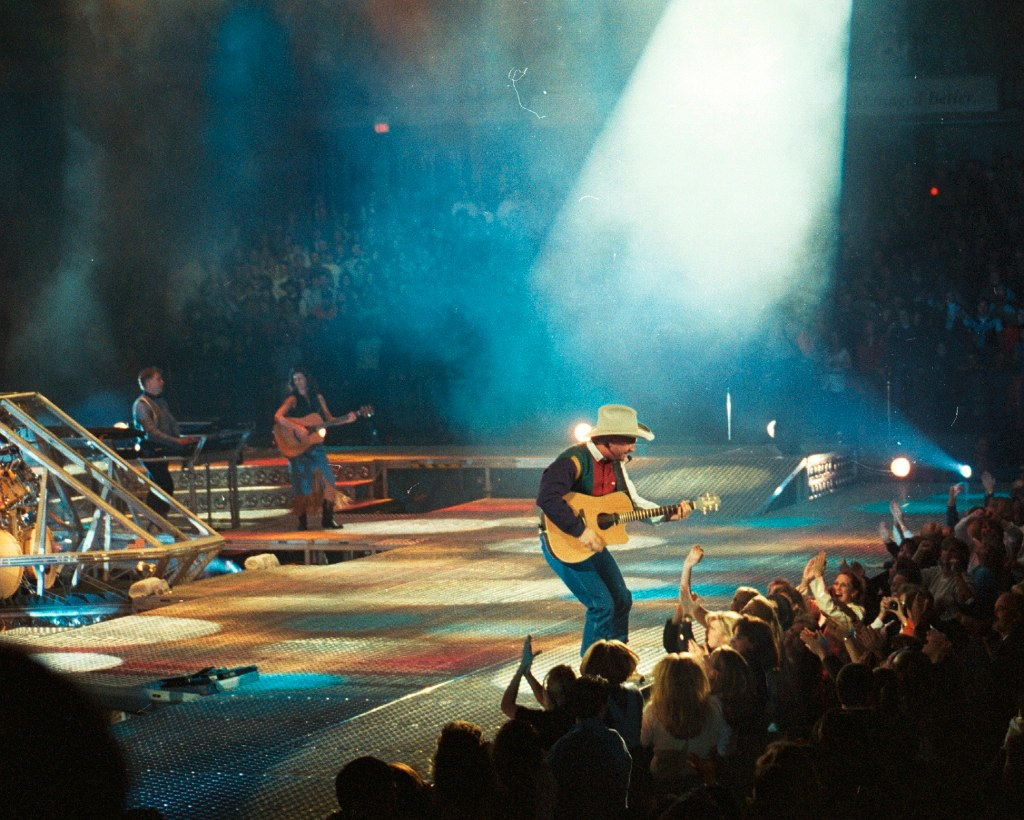
Ropin' the Wind by Garth Brooks was the best-selling album of 1992.

These are the Billboard magazine number-one albums of 1992, per the Billboard 200.

== Chart history ==
Key
†	Indicates best performing album of 1992

Issue date	Album	Artist(s)	Label(s)	Sales	Ref.
January 4	Dangerous	Michael Jackson	Epic	370,000	
January 11	Nevermind	Nirvana	Geffen	373,520	
January 18	Ropin' the Wind †	Garth Brooks	Capitol	260,000	
January 25	Ropin' the Wind †	Garth Brooks	Capitol	160,500	
February 1	Nevermind	Nirvana	Geffen	134,000	
February 8	Ropin' the Wind †	Garth Brooks	Capitol	168,000	
February 15	Ropin' the Wind †	Garth Brooks	Capitol	190,000	
February 22	Ropin' the Wind †	Garth Brooks	Capitol	205,500	
February 29	Ropin' the Wind †	Garth Brooks	Capitol	169,000	
March 7	Ropin' the Wind †	Garth Brooks	Capitol	132,000	
March 14	Ropin' the Wind †	Garth Brooks	Capitol	114,000	
March 21	Ropin' the Wind †	Garth Brooks	Capitol	104,000	
March 28	Ropin' the Wind †	Garth Brooks	Capitol	110,000	
April 4	Wayne's World	Soundtrack	Reprise	108,000	
April 11	Wayne's World	Soundtrack	Reprise	110,000	
April 18	Adrenalize	Def Leppard	Mercury	380,000	
April 25	Adrenalize	Def Leppard	Mercury	261,000	
May 2	Adrenalize	Def Leppard	Mercury	203,000	
May 9	Adrenalize	Def Leppard	Mercury	154,000	
May 16	Adrenalize	Def Leppard	Mercury	123,000	
May 23	Totally Krossed Out	Kris Kross	Ruffhouse/Columbia	137,000	
May 30	The Southern Harmony and Musical Companion	The Black Crowes	Def American	142,000	
June 6	Totally Krossed Out	Kris Kross	Ruffhouse	112,000	
June 13	Some Gave All	Billy Ray Cyrus	Mercury	122,000	
June 20	Some Gave All	Billy Ray Cyrus	Mercury	160,000	
June 27	Some Gave All	Billy Ray Cyrus	Mercury	227,000	
July 4	Some Gave All	Billy Ray Cyrus	Mercury	242,000	
July 11	Some Gave All	Billy Ray Cyrus	Mercury	279,000	
July 18	Some Gave All	Billy Ray Cyrus	Mercury	271,500	
July 25	Some Gave All	Billy Ray Cyrus	Mercury	231,000	
August 1	Some Gave All	Billy Ray Cyrus	Mercury	205,000	
August 8	Some Gave All	Billy Ray Cyrus	Mercury	172,000	
August 15	Some Gave All	Billy Ray Cyrus	Mercury	159,000	
August 22	Some Gave All	Billy Ray Cyrus	Mercury	141,500	
August 29	Some Gave All	Billy Ray Cyrus	Mercury	137,000	
September 5	Some Gave All	Billy Ray Cyrus	Mercury	144,000	
September 12	Some Gave All	Billy Ray Cyrus	Mercury	118,000	
September 19	Some Gave All	Billy Ray Cyrus	Mercury	118,000	
September 26	Some Gave All	Billy Ray Cyrus	Mercury	120,000	
October 3	Some Gave All	Billy Ray Cyrus	Mercury	133,000	
October 10	The Chase	Garth Brooks	Liberty	403,000	
October 17	The Chase	Garth Brooks	Liberty	413,000	
October 24	The Chase	Garth Brooks	Liberty	338,000	
October 31	The Chase	Garth Brooks	Liberty	220,000	
November 7	The Chase	Garth Brooks	Liberty	171,000	
November 14	The Chase	Garth Brooks	Liberty	148,000	
November 21	Timeless: The Classics	Michael Bolton	Columbia	151,500	
November 28	The Chase	Garth Brooks	Liberty	136,000	
December 5	The Predator	Ice Cube	Lench Mob/Priority	193,000	
December 12	The Bodyguard	Whitney Houston / Soundtrack	Arista	292,000	
December 19	The Bodyguard	Whitney Houston / Soundtrack	Arista	410,000	
December 26	The Bodyguard	Whitney Houston / Soundtrack	Arista	574,000	

== See also ==
- 1992 in music
