= So So Def Bass All-Stars =

So So Def Bass All Stars

Compilation album by various artists
- Released: May 22, 1996
- Genre: Bass music
- Length: 42:27
- Label: So So Def; Columbia
- Producer: Black Market Entertainment; Carl Mo; Danny D; DJ Herb; DJ Kizzy Rock; DJ Nabs; Kidd Money; Kool Kollie; Playa Poncho; The Dynamik Duo; Zae'

Various artists chronology
| So So Def Bass All Stars (1996) | So So Def Bass All-Stars Vol. II (1997) |

Singles from So So Def Bass All Stars
- 1. "Whatz Up, Whatz Up" Released: July 4, 1995; 2. "My Boo" Released: June 25, 1996

Professional ratings
Review scores
| Source | Rating |
|---|---|
| AllMusic | 3/5 stars |

So So Def Bass All-Stars is a compilation album of bass music by American record label So So Def Recordings. It was released on May 22, 1996, through Columbia Records with distribution via Sony Music. Production was handled by Black Market Entertainment, Carl Mo, Danny D, DJ Herb, DJ Kizzy Rock, DJ Nabs, Kidd Money, Kool Kollie, Playa Poncho, The Dynamik Duo and Zae', with Jermaine Dupri serving as executive producer. It features contributions from Big Ace, Don Yute, Edward J, Ghost Town DJ's, Kidd Money, L.A. Sno, MC Shy D, Mr. Collipark, Playa Poncho, Raheem the Dream, T'Baby, The City Boyz, Trigga Man, Zae' and Bass Allstars.

The album made it to number 32 on the US Billboard 200. It was certified Gold by the Recording Industry Association of America on September 19, 1996, for selling 500,000 copies in the United States.

Its lead single, "Whatz Up, Whatz Up", peaked at No. 63 on the US Billboard Hot R&B/Hip-Hop Songs, while its second single, "My Boo", was a success charting at No. 27 on the Billboard Hot 100, No. 3 in New Zealand, No. 26 in Australia and No. 157 in France, as well as receiving Gold certification by the Recording Industry Association of New Zealand.

So So Def Bass All-Stars Vol. II, the album's sequel, was released the following year. So So Def Bass All-Stars Vol. III, the third and final compilation of 'So So Def Bass All-Stars' series was released in 1998.

== Track listing ==
| No. | Title | Writer(s) | Producer(s) | Length |
|---|---|---|---|---|
| 1. | "Edward J Bass Test" (Edward J) | | Kool Kollie | 1:51 |
| 2. | "My Boo" (Ghost Town DJ's) | Rodney Terry; Carlton Mahone | Kool Kollie | 5:46 |
| 3. | "Thyow" (Zae') | John R. Gilliam; Gregory Allen | Zae' | 3:02 |
| 4. | "Whatz Up, Whatz Up" (Playa Poncho and L.A. Sno) | Gerald McCrary; Ira Brown; Carlos Young | DJ Kizzy Rock | 3:47 |
| 5. | "Shakedown" (Trigga Man and Kidd Money) | Kervin Paul; Sean Terrell Chavis; Tony Butler | Kidd Money | 2:39 |
| 6. | "So So Def Bass Contest" (Raheem the Dream) | | Playa Poncho; Lil' Jon | 0:43 |
| 7. | "Koochie Kuterz" (Playa Poncho) | McCrary; Youtha Anthony Fowler | Playa Poncho; DJ Nabs | 3:45 |
| 8. | "City Boy Bounce" (The City Boyz) | | DJ Herb | 1:19 |
| 9. | "Body Hop (Oh My Goodness)" (T'Baby and Big Ace) | Tarecha Strachan; Charles Ellison Jr.; Danny Lee Spohn; Herman Kelly; John Robie; Emilio Innocenti | Danny D | 2:51 |
| 10. | "Sexiest" (Don Yute) | Jason Andrew Williams; Terry | Kool Kollie | 3:47 |
| 11. | "Intro" (MC Shy D and DJ Smurf) | | | 0:16 |
| 12. | "Mega Mix" (Bass Allstars) | | | 4:59 |
| 13. | "Let It Burn" (Playa Poncho) | McCrary; Mahone; Jonathan Smith; Paul Lewis; Keith Sweat; Teddy Riley | Carl Mo; The Dynamik Duo | 5:18 |
| 14. | "Edward J Bass Test Outro" (Edward J) | | R.O.B.; Emperor Searcy | 2:17 |
| Total length: | | | | 42:27 |

== Personnel ==
- Edward J. Landrum – vocals (tracks: 1, 14)
- Virgo Williams – vocals (track 2)
- John R. "Zae'" Gilliam – vocals & producer (track 3)
- Gerald "Playa Poncho" McCrary – vocals (tracks: 4, 7, 13), producer (tracks: 6, 7)
- Ira "L.A. Sno" Brown – vocals (track 4)
- Kervin "Trigga Man" Paul – vocals (track 5)
- Sean "Kidd Money" Chavis – vocals & producer (track 5)
- Micaiah "Raheem the Dream" Raheem – vocals (track 6)
- The City Boyz – vocals (track 8)
- Tarecha "T'Baby" Strachan – vocals (track 9)
- Charles "Big Ace" Ellison Jr. – vocals (track 9)
- Jason Andrew "Don Yute" Williams – vocals (track 10)
- Michael "Mr. Collipark" Crooms – voice (track 11)
- Peter "MC Shy D" Jones – voice (track 11)
- Rodney "Kool Kollie" Terry – producer (tracks: 1, 2, 10), mixing (tracks: 1, 2, 10)
- Carlos "DJ Kizzy Rock" Young – producer (track 4)
- Jonathan "Lil Jon" Smith – producer (tracks: 6, 13), arranger (tracks: 1, 14), mixing (tracks: 1–4, 9, 10, 13), sequencing
- Youtha Anthony "DJ Nabs" Fowler – producer (track 7)
- Herbert "DJ Herb" Hawkins – producer (track 8)
- Danny "D" Lee Spohn – producer (track 9), mixing (tracks: 9, 12), re-mixing (track 12)
- Carlton "Carl Mo" Mahone – producer & mixing (track 13)
- Paul Lewis – producer & mixing (track 13)
- Dwayne "Emperor" Searcy – producer (track 14)
- Robert "R.O.B." McDowell – producer (track 14)
- King James – mixing (track 1)
- Zach Solem – mixing (track 3)
- Richard Wells – mixing (track 5), recording (track 8)
- Oscar Jimenez – mixing (tracks: 7, 10)
- Carlos Santos – mixing (tracks: 9, 12)
- Taj Mahal – mixing (track 13)
- Rodney Fuller – mastering
- Hans Gutknecht – sequencing
- Jermaine Dupri – executive producer

== Charts ==
=== Weekly charts ===
| Chart (1996) | Peak position |
|---|---|
| US Billboard 200 | 32 |
| US Top R&B Albums (Billboard) | 9 |

=== Year-end charts ===
| Chart (1996) | Position |
|---|---|
| US Billboard 200 | 141 |
| US Top R&B Albums (Billboard) | 37 |

== Certifications ==
| Region | Certification | Certified units/sales |
|---|---|---|
| United States (RIAA) | Gold | 500,000^{^} |
^{^} Shipments figures based on certification alone.
