= I Missed the Bus =

Single by Kris Kross

from the album Totally Krossed Out
- Released: September 3, 1992
- Recorded: 1991
- Genre: Hip-hop
- Length: 2:59
- Label: Ruffhouse; Columbia
- Songwriter: Jermaine Dupri
- Producer: Jermaine Dupri

Kris Kross singles chronology
"Warm It Up" (1992)	"I Missed the Bus" (1992)	"It's a Shame" (1993)

Music video
- "I Missed the Bus" on YouTube

"I Missed the Bus" is a song by American hip-hop duo Kris Kross. It was released in September 1992 by Ruffhouse and Columbia Records as the third single from their debut album, Totally Krossed Out (1992). The song was both written and produced by Jermaine Dupri and peaked at numbers 56 and 63 on the US Cash Box Top 100 and Billboard Hot 100 charts. In the UK, it reached number 57 on the UK Singles Chart. It contains samples from the 1976 song "Keep Your Eye on the Sparrow", which was performed by Sammy Davis Jr.

== Release ==
"I Missed the Bus" was the third single from Totally Krossed Out, following "Jump" and "Warm It Up", both of which made it to number one on the US Billboard Hot Rap Singles chart. Though the single was not as successful as the group's previous two, "I Missed the Bus" managed to make it to number 14 on the Hot Rap Singles chart, number 56 on the Cash Box Top 100 and number 63 on the Billboard Hot 100. The song was written and produced by Jermaine Dupri.

== Critical reception ==
In his review of the album, Steve Huey from AllMusic viewed the song as "self-explanatory". Larry Flick from Billboard magazine wrote, "Currently in the midst of its first U.S. concert tour, kid duo digs into its triple-platinum debut, Totally Krossed Out, and pulls out a contagious anthem that is (gratefully) not as derivative of 'Jump' as the previous 'Warm It Up'. Pro-education message is well-timed with back-to-school season and should click with teen audiences."

== Music video ==
The song's music video, which received heavy play on MTV and BET, employs satirical horror movie imagery to illustrate the anxiety of missing the bus and being late for school. The bus driver is depicted as a dancing zombie with rotting, mottled flesh. A female school teacher appears as a bizarre creature with compound eyes, reminiscent of the protagonist of The Fly films, while her students are catatonic, nodding drones, covered in cobwebs and hypnotized by her powers. Dupri appears as a magistrate in a judicial wig, convicting the tardy duo in a kangaroo court, pounding a gavel and occasionally scratching turntables.

== Track listing ==
1. "I Missed the Bus" (Backwards To School Radio Version) - 3:00
2. "I Missed the Bus" (School Crossing Mix) - 2:56

== Charts ==
Chart (1992)	Peak position
Australia (ARIA)	95
Finland (Suomen virallinen lista)	16
Netherlands (Dutch Top 40 Tipparade)	14
Netherlands (Single Top 100)	46
New Zealand (Recorded Music NZ)	28
UK Singles (Official Charts)	57
UK Club Chart (Music Week)	99
US Billboard Hot 100	63
US Hot Rap Songs (Billboard)	14
US Hot R&B/Hip-Hop Songs (Billboard)	29
US Cash Box Top 100	56
