= Da Bomb (song) =

Single by Kris Kross featuring Da Brat

from the album Da Bomb
- Released: February 1, 1994
- Genre: G-funk
- Length: 4:10
- Label: So So Def; Ruffhouse; Sony Music
- Songwriter(s): Jermaine Mauldin; Shawntae Harris
- Producer(s): Jermaine Dupri

Kris Kross singles chronology
"I'm Real" (1993)	"Da Bomb" (1994)	"Tonite's tha Night" (1995)

"Da Bomb" is the third and final single released by American hip-hop duo Kris Kross from their second album, Da Bomb (1993). It features rapper Da Brat in what was her first appearance on a song. Da Bomb would prove to be the least successful single released from the album, not charting on the Billboard Hot 100 and making it to #25 on the Hot Rap Singles. Two versions of the song were released the original LP version and the Explosive Mix that was used in the music video. The line "I drop bombs like Hiroshima" was edited out of the song for the album's Japanese release.

== Critical reception ==
Dr. Bayyan from Cash Box wrote, "You better watch your back, this title track comes complete with a rolling thunder phat beat, quirky synth feels, a little scratch-and-sniff turntable work. And let's not forget the youthful flow of Daddy Mac and Mac Daddy. It's the Explosive Mix remix that makes this worth a listen at radio." Bill Speed and John Martinucci from the Gavin Report noted that it "gives you a strong indication of where Kris Kross is heading as they drop a funk groove with a rough edge."

== Track listing ==
1. "Da Bomb" (Remix - The Explosive Mix)- 3:53
2. "Da Bomb" (LP Version)- 4:04
