= Da Bomb (album) =

Studio album by Kris Kross
- Released: August 3, 1993
- Recorded: 1993
- Genres: G-funk; hip hop
- Length: 38:44
- Labels: Ruffhouse; Columbia; SME CK 57278 (US)
- Producer: Jermaine Dupri

Kris Kross chronology
| Totally Krossed Out (1992) | Da Bomb (1993) | Young, Rich & Dangerous (1996) |

Singles from Da Bomb
- 1. "Alright" Released: July 13, 1993; 2. "I'm Real" Released: October 5, 1993; 3. "Da Bomb" Released: February 1, 1994

Alternative cover
- The Japan album cover which was completely repackaged due to the Hiroshima situation.

Professional ratings
Review scores
| Source | Rating |
|---|---|
| AllMusic | 2.5/5 stars |
| Robert Christgau | (2-star Honorable Mention) |
| NME | 3/10 |
| The Philadelphia Inquirer | 2/4 stars |
| Rolling Stone | 3/5 stars |
| Vibe | (favorable) |

Da Bomb is the second studio album by the hip-hop duo Kris Kross, released a year after their first album Totally Krossed Out. The group tried a hardcore/gangsta look to fit with the new style of hip-hop. The album was not as successful as Totally Krossed Out, as many fans were not impressed with the new look and style and the use of the word "nigga" and reviews were mixed. The line "I drop bombs like Hiroshima" from "Da Bomb" was edited out of the album's Japanese release and the artwork was completely changed. The album was certified platinum in the US. Three singles were released, "Alright", "I'm Real" and "Da Bomb".

== Track listing ==
1. "Intro" (Dupri, Jermaine) – 0:19
2. "Da Bomb" featuring Da Brat (Da Brat/Dupri, Jermaine) – 4:10
3. "Sound of My Hood" (Dupri, Jermaine) – 2:40
4. "It Don't Stop (Hip Hop Classic)" (Simmons, J./Dupri, Jermaine/McDaniels, Darryl "DMC"/Kelly, Chris) – 2:56
5. "D.J. Nabs Break" (Dupri, Jermaine/DJ Nabs) – 1:41
6. "Alright" featuring Super Cat (Dupri, Jermaine) – 4:03
7. "I'm Real" (Dupri, Jermaine) – 3:14
8. "2 da Beat Ch'Yall" (Dupri, Jermaine/Kelly, Chris) – 3:41
9. "Freak da Funk" (Dupri, Jermaine) – 2:59
10. "A Lot 2 Live 4" (Dupri, Jermaine) – 2:14
11. "Take Um Out" (Dupri, Jermaine) – 4:35
12. "Alright [Extended Remix] (Dupri, Jermaine) – 6:01

== Charts ==
=== Weekly charts ===
| Chart (1993) | Peak position |
|---|---|
| Australian Albums (ARIA) | 133 |
| Canada Top Albums/CDs (RPM) | 47 |
| German Albums (Offizielle Top 100) | 85 |
| US Billboard 200 | 13 |
| US Top R&B/Hip-Hop Albums (Billboard) | 2 |

=== Year-end charts ===
| Chart (1993) | Position |
|---|---|
| US Top R&B/Hip-Hop Albums (Billboard) | 48 |

== Certifications ==
| Region | Certification | Certified units/sales |
|---|---|---|
| Canada (Music Canada) | Gold | 50,000^{^} |
| United States (RIAA) | Platinum | 1,000,000^{^} |
^{^} Shipments figures based on certification alone.

== Samples ==
- "Da Bomb"
  - "The Look of Love" by Isaac Hayes
  - "The Big Beat" by Billy Squier
- "Alright"
  - "Just a Touch of Love" by Slave
- "I'm Real"
  - "Nuthin' but a 'G' Thang" by Dr. Dre
  - "Mary Jane by Rick James
- "2 Da Beat Ch'yall"
  - "Funky Worm" by Ohio Players
  - "The Freeze (Sizzaleenmean)" by Parliament
  - "More Bounce to the Ounce" by Zapp
- "Freak da Funk"
  - "Free Your Mind and Your Ass Will Follow" by Funkadelic
- "It Don't Stop (Hip Hop Classic)"
  - "Hihache" by Lafayette Afro Rock Band
  - "The Big Beat" by Billy Squier
- "Sound of My Hood"
  - "Give It Away" by Red Hot Chili Peppers
  - "The Day the Niggaz Took Over" by Dr. Dre
  - "Mister Magic" by Grover Washington Jr.
- "Take Um Out"
  - "Kool Is Back" by Funk, Inc.
  - "More Bounce to the Ounce" by Zapp
- "A Lot 2 Live 4"
  - A Different World dialogue
