= Totally Krossed Out =

Studio album by Kris Kross
- Released: March 31, 1992
- Recorded: 1991
- Genre: Hip hop
- Length: 39:33
- Labels: Ruffhouse; Columbia
- Producers: Jermaine Dupri; Joe "The Butcher" Nicolo

Kris Kross chronology
Totally Krossed Out (1992)	Da Bomb (1993)

Singles from Totally Krossed Out
- 1. "Jump" Released: February 6, 1992; 2. "Warm It Up" Released: June 4, 1992; 3. "I Missed the Bus" Released: September 3, 1992; 4. "The Way of Rhyme" Released: 1992; 5. "It's a Shame" Released: January 12, 1993

Totally Krossed Out is the debut studio album by American hip hop duo Kris Kross. It was produced and largely written by Jermaine Dupri and Joe "The Butcher" Nicolo and released on March 31, 1992, by Ruffhouse Records and Columbia Records. After developing a musical concept for the duo, Dupri and Nicolo spent two years writing and producing the album.

== Critical reception ==
Professional ratings
Review scores
Source	Rating
AllMusic	4/5 stars
The Baltimore Sun	(favorable)
Calgary Herald	C+
Robert Christgau	A−
Entertainment Weekly	(favorable)
Los Angeles Times	3.5/4 stars
People	(favorable)
Select	3/5 stars

In a contemporary review for The Village Voice, the music critic Robert Christgau gave the album an "A−" and praised Dupri for "avoiding BBD's girl-bashing and ABC's kiddie escapism" in his lyrics for the duo. He found the music "ebullient" and suited for Kris Kross' "preadolescent tempos and timbres". "Jump" was voted the third-best single of 1992 in The Village Voice's annual Pazz & Jop critics' poll. Christgau, the poll's creator, named it the best single of the year in his own year-end list and also ranked "Warm It Up" at number four.

In a retrospective review, AllMusic's Steve Huey gave the album four out of five stars and said that Dupri "delivers a catchy, pop-friendly batch of tracks that manage to stay pretty consistently engaging (perhaps in part because they are short)".

== Commercial performance ==
Totally Krossed Out was a huge success for the duo, selling over four million copies and reaching No. 1 on the Billboard 200 and the Top R&B/Hip-Hop Albums chart, where it remained for two and six non-consecutive weeks respectively. Four singles were released, including "Jump" and "Warm It Up", both of which reached No. 1 on the Hot Rap Singles, and "I Missed the Bus" and "It's a Shame". The album was certified 4× platinum by the RIAA. Music videos were released for the four singles and for "The Way of Rhyme", even though the song was not released as a single.

== Track listing ==
All songs written and produced by Jermaine Dupri and Joe "The Butcher" Nicolo, except where noted.

1. "Intro Interview" – 0:51
2. "Jump" (Jermaine Dupri, Joe "The Butcher" Nicolo, The Corporation, Ohio Players, Roy C, Cypress Hill, Lowell Fulson, Jimmy McCracklin, James Brown, Schoolly D, Naughty by Nature, Herb Rooney) – 3:15
3. "Lil' Boys in da Hood" – 3:05
4. "Warm It Up" – 4:08
5. "The Way of Rhyme" – 2:59
6. "Party" (Jermaine Dupri, Joe "The Butcher" Nicolo, George Clinton, Garry Shider, David Spradley) – 4:02
7. "We're in da House" – 0:39
8. "A Real Bad Dream" – 1:58
9. "It's a Shame" – 3:46
10. "Can't Stop the Bum Rush" – 2:57
11. "You Can't Get With This" – 2:24
12. "I Missed the Bus" – 2:59
13. "Outro" – 0:43
14. "Party" (Krossed Mix) – 4:10
15. "Jump" (Extended Mix) – 5:10

== Personnel ==
Credits are adapted from Allmusic.

- Glenn Barratt – editing
- Walt Bass – background vocals
- Stacey Blackmore – background vocals
- Tony Dawsey – mastering
- Curtis Dowd, Jr. – keyboards
- Jermaine Dupri – arranger, background vocals, electric bass, executive producer, producer, programming
- Joe "The Butcher" Nicolo – arranger, engineer, drums, electric bass, percussion, producer, programming
- Seldon "Big Wally" Henderson – keyboards
- John Hodian – engineer
- Frank Hogan – background vocals
- Charlene Holloway – background vocals
- Paula Holloway – background vocals
- Dave Johnson – background vocals
- Kris Kelly – vocals
- Andy Kravitz – percussion
- Kris Kross – vocals
- Lady G. – background vocals
- Manuel Lecuona – background vocals
- Rose Mann – background vocals
- Joe Nicolo – engineer, executive producer, programming
- Phil Nicolo – engineer
- Jim "Jiff" Ninger – background vocals
- Jimmy O'Neil – assistant engineer
- Jim Salamone – drums, keyboards
- Mark Schulz – background vocals
- Terry Shelton – voices
- Silk Tymes Leather – background vocals
- Eddie Weather – background vocals
- X-Man – background vocals

== Charts ==
=== Weekly charts ===
Chart (1992)	Peak position
Australian Albums (ARIA)	7
Austrian Albums (Ö3 Austria)	33
Canada Top Albums/CDs (RPM)	2
Dutch Albums (Album Top 100)	28
German Albums (Offizielle Top 100)	14
New Zealand Albums (RMNZ)	23
Swedish Albums (Sverigetopplistan)	30
Swiss Albums (Schweizer Hitparade)	16
UK Albums (Official Charts)	31
US Billboard 200	1
US Top R&B/Hip-Hop Albums (Billboard)	1

=== Year-end charts ===
Chart (1992)	Position
Canada Top Albums/CDs (RPM)	13
German Albums (Offizielle Top 100)	66
US Billboard 200	10
US Top R&B/Hip-Hop Albums (Billboard)	9

=== Decade-end charts ===
Chart (1990–1999)	Position
U.S. Billboard 200	90

== Certifications ==
Region	Certification	Certified units/sales
Australia (ARIA)	Gold	35,000^{^}
Canada (Music Canada)	3× Platinum	300,000^{^}
United States (RIAA)	4× Platinum	4,000,000^{^}
^{^} Shipments figures based on certification alone.

== See also ==
- List of number-one albums of 1992 (U.S.)
- List of number-one R&B albums of 1992 (U.S.)
