= Young, Rich & Dangerous =

Studio album by Kris Kross
- Released: January 9, 1996
- Recorded: 1995
- Genre: Hip hop
- Length: 36:33
- Label: Ruffhouse; So So Def; Columbia
- Producer: Jermaine Dupri, Kris Kross

Kris Kross chronology
Da Bomb (1993)	Young, Rich & Dangerous (1996)	Best of Kris Kross Remixed '92 '94 '96 (1996)

Singles from Young, Rich & Dangerous
- 1. "Tonite's tha Night" Released: November 21, 1995; 2. "Live and Die for Hip Hop" Released: February 8, 1996

Professional ratings
Review scores
Source	Rating
AllMusic	3/5 stars
Billboard	(favorable)
Cash Box	(favorable)
Robert Christgau	(dud)
The Guardian	2/5 stars
The Source	3.5/5 stars

Young, Rich & Dangerous is the third and final studio album by American hip hop duo Kris Kross, released on January 9, 1996, by So So Def Recordings. Produced by both Jermaine Dupri and the duo, the album features the singles "Tonite's tha Night" and "Live and Die for Hip-Hop"; the latter featuring Da Brat, Aaliyah, Jermaine Dupri, and Mr. Black. Though Young, Rich & Dangerous peaked at #15 on the Billboard 200 and was certified gold by the RIAA, it was the group's least successful and also their final album.

== Track listing ==
The Smith Side
No.	Title	Producer(s)	Length
1.	"Some Cut Up" (featuring Trey Lorenz)	Jermaine Dupri	1:45
2.	"When the Homies Show Up"	Dupri	1:31
3.	"Tonite's tha Night" (featuring Trey Lorenz)	Dupri	3:16
4.	"Interview" (featuring Dream Hampton)	Dupri	0:39
5.	"Young, Rich and Dangerous" (featuring Big Rube & Da Brat)	Dupri	3:50
6.	"Live and Die for Hip Hop" (featuring Da Brat, Aaliyah, Jermaine Dupri & Mr. Black)	Dupri	3:43

The Kelly Side
No.	Title	Producer(s)	Length
7.	"Money, Power and Fame (Three Thangs Thats Necessities)" (featuring Chris Terry)	Kris Kross	3:48
8.	"It's a Group Thang"	Dupri	0:51
9.	"Mackin' Ain't Easy"	Dupri	2:58
10.	"Da Streets Ain't Right"	Dupri	3:00
11.	"Hey Sexy" (featuring Chris Terry)	Kris Kross	3:40
12.	"Tonite's tha Night (Remix)" (featuring Trey Lorenz)	Dupri	3:41

== Samples ==
- "Tonite's tha Night"
  - "Riding High" by Faze-O
- "Da Streets Ain't Right"
  - "Talking in Your Sleep" by the Romantics
  - "Warning" by the Notorious B.I.G.
- "Live and Die for Hip Hop"
  - "Baby Come to Me" by Regina Belle
- "It's a Group Thang"
  - "Dopeman" by NWA
- "Mackin' Ain't Easy"
  - "Love Will Find a Way" by Lionel Richie
- "Money, Power and Fame (Three Thangs Thats Necessities)"
  - "I Need Love" by LL Cool J
- "Some Cut Up"
  - "Intimate Connection" by Kleeer
- "Tonight's tha Night" (Remix)
  - "Deep Cover" by Dr. Dre

== Charts ==
=== Weekly charts ===
Chart performance for Young, Rich & Dangerous
Chart (1996)	Peak position
US Billboard 200	15
US Top R&B/Hip-Hop Albums (Billboard)	2

=== Year-end charts ===
1996 year-end chart performance for Young, Rich & Dangerous
Chart (1996)	Position
US Billboard 200	149
US Top R&B/Hip-Hop Albums (Billboard)	43

== Certifications ==
Certifications for Young, Rich & Dangerous
Region	Certification	Certified units/sales
United States (RIAA)	Gold	500,000^{^}
^{^} Shipments figures based on certification alone.
