= Live and Die for Hip Hop =

Single by Kris Kross featuring Aaliyah, Da Brat, Jermaine Dupri and Mr. Black

from the album Young, Rich & Dangerous
- Released: February 8, 1996
- Recorded: 1995
- Studio: Krosswire Studio (Atlanta, Georgia)
- Length: 3:43
- Label: So So Def; Ruffhouse; Columbia; Sony
- Songwriters: Jermaine Mauldin; Shawntae Harris; Mr. Black; Narada Michael Walden; Jeffrey Cohen
- Producer: Jermaine Dupri

Kris Kross singles chronology
"Tonite's tha Night" (1995)	"Live and Die for Hip Hop" (1996)

Aaliyah singles chronology
"The Thing I Like" (1995)	"Live and Die for Hip Hop" (1996)	"If Your Girl Only Knew" (1996)

Audio video
- "Live and Die for Hip Hop" on YouTube

"Live and Die for Hip Hop" is a song by American hip-hop duo Kris Kross, released in February 1996 by So So Def, Ruffhouse, Columbia and Sony, as the second and final single from the duo's third album, Young, Rich & Dangerous (1996). It is their ninth and final single overall, and features Da Brat, Jermaine Dupri, Mr. Black, and background vocals by R&B singer Aaliyah. The song also contains a sample of "Baby Come to Me" by Regina Belle and 'I Can't Believe' by Mother's Finest. "Live and Die for Hip Hop" peaked at numbers 60 and 72 on the US Cash Box Top 100 and Billboard Hot 100 charts. The accompanying music video was directed by David Nelson and premiered on BET, MTV, MTV 2, VH-1 and Fuse.

== Promotion ==
A music video was released. Kriss Kross, Aaliyah, Da Brat, Jermaine Dupri and Mr. Black performed the single on the television programme Video Soul on January 16, 1996.

== Commercial performance ==
It was not as successful as "Tonite's tha Night", however it did gain some success, making it to numbers 60 and 72 on the US Cash Box Top 100 and Billboard Hot 100 charts, and number 11 on the Billboard Hot Rap Singles chart. A remix was made featuring DJ Clark Kent.

== Critical reception ==
Larry Flick from Billboard magazine wrote, "The new and mature Kris Kross will easily continue picking up props and credibility with this second single from the fine Young, Rich And Dangerous. Employing samples of 'Baby Come to Me' by Regina Belle and 'I Can't Believe' by Mother's Finest, producer Jermaine Dupri lays a chilled, soulful musical vibe for the lads to flex their rhyming muscles—which they do with jock-grabbin' confidence. Smooth enough to make the grade at top 40 radio. Check it out."

== Single track listing ==
1. "Live and Die for Hip Hop" featuring Da Brat, Jermaine Dupri, Mr. Black and Aaliyah (extended LP version) - 4:49
2. "Live and Die for Hip Hop" (radio extended version) - 4:49
3. "Live and Die for Hip Hop" (LP version instrumental) - 3:43
4. "Live and Die for Hip Hop" featuring DJ Clark Kent (DJ Clark Kent Mix) - 3:47
5. "Live and Die for Hip Hop" (DJ Clark Kent Mix Instrumental) - 3:47
6. "Tonite's tha Night" featuring Redman (remix) - 3:22

== Charts ==
Weekly chart performance for "Live and Die for Hip Hop"
Chart (1996)	Peak position
US Billboard Hot 100	72
US Hot Rap Songs (Billboard)	11
US Cash Box Top 100	60
