= Kris Kross =

American hip-hop group

- Smith (left) and Kelly in 1996

Background information
- Origin: Atlanta, Georgia, U.S.
- Genre: Southern hip-hop
- Years active: 1990–2002; 2007–2013
- Labels: CCO; One Life; Ruffhouse; Columbia; Judgement
- Past members: Chris "Mac Daddy" Kelly; Chris "Daddy Mac" Smith

Kris Kross was an American hip-hop duo composed of rappers Chris "Mac Daddy" Kelly and Chris "Daddy Mac" Smith and formed by record producer Jermaine Dupri. They were the youngest hip-hop group to gain commercial success, charting releases by the age of 13. Smith and Kelly were discovered by Dupri in 1990, with whom they signed as the first act on his record label So So Def Recordings.

The duo saw national recognition with their 1992 debut single, "Jump", which sat atop the Billboard Hot 100 for eight weeks and received double platinum certification by the Recording Industry Association of America (RIAA). They released three studio albums; their first, Totally Krossed Out (1992), peaked atop the US Billboard 200, while their second and third, Da Bomb (1993) and Young, Rich & Dangerous (1996), both entered the top 20. The duo were also noted for their signature fashion style of backward attire. Kelly died of a drug overdose on May 1, 2013.

== History ==
The friendship of Atlanta, Georgia, natives James Christopher Kelly (August 11, 1978 – May 1, 2013) and Christopher Smith (born January 10, 1979), began in first grade. The duo was discovered at Greenbriar Mall in Atlanta in 1990 by then-18-year-old Jermaine Dupri. According to Dupri, Kelly and Smith were not pursuing a record deal and were not rappers or musicians when he met them. He was impressed with their style, and Kris Kross became the first artists signed to Dupri's So So Def label.

=== 1992: Totally Krossed Out ===
Along with Dupri, the two signed a deal with Ruffhouse Records and recorded their debut album Totally Krossed Out. Entirely produced by Dupri, Totally Krossed Out was released on March 31, 1992, and sold four million copies in the U.S. It included the hit single "Jump", which topped the Billboard Hot 100 and held that position for eight weeks.

The music videos from the album also experienced major success. The video for "Jump", directed by filmmaker Rich Murray, went to No. 1 on MTV and sold over 100,000 copies as a VHS video single. The video for their follow-up single, "Warm It Up", also directed by Murray, won a Billboard video award for "Best New Artist", and got to No. 14 the same year as "Jump". Writes The New York Daily News' Jim Farber: "Together, that was enough to propel the duo's debut album, Totally Krossed Out, to multi-platinum status."

=== 1992–1993: Michael Jackson tour and additional media projects ===
The duo landed a spot on Michael Jackson's 1992 European Dangerous World Tour as well as a cameo appearance on Jackson's music video for his 1992 single "Jam". Additionally, they made appearances in the music videos for Run-D.M.C.'s "Down with the King" (1993) and TLC's "Hat 2 da Back" (1992), and they were featured in an episode of A Different World and as the closing musical act on the May 29, 1992, episode of In Living Color.

A video game starring the pair, titled Kris Kross: Make My Video, was released in 1992 on the Sega CD system. It consisted of the players editing together the group's music videos for a few of their hit songs using portions of the original music videos, stock footage, and general video animation effects. Players were prompted before each editing session to make sure to have certain footage compiled into the video. It was ranked 18th on Electronic Gaming Monthly's list of the "20 Worst Games of All Time". Kris Kross made a cameo appearance in Ted Demme's film Who's the Man? (1993), which starred rapper Ed Lover and radio personality Doctor Dré of Yo! MTV Raps fame.

Kris Kross were also part of the promotional campaign for Sprite in 1993 of which they recorded an exclusive rap, a promotional photoshoot, and a commercial for the brand.

=== 1993: Da Bomb ===
The duo's second album, Da Bomb (1993), was certified platinum and spawned the hits "Alright", a diss track directed at rivals Da Youngstas that featured Super Cat, and "I'm Real" and "Da Bomb", featuring Da Brat, whom Smith had discovered.

=== 1996: Young, Rich & Dangerous ===
A third album, Young, Rich & Dangerous, was released in early 1996 and was certified gold. It spawned the two hits "Tonite's tha Night" and "Live and Die for Hip Hop".

=== Education ===
Both members of Kris Kross went to Woodward Academy in College Park, Georgia. Kelly studied mix-engineering, and founded C Connection Records. Smith studied marketing and business management and founded One Life Entertainment, Inc.

=== 2013: Final show ===
Kris Kross' last performance was in their hometown at the Fox Theatre for So So Def's 20th Anniversary concert on February 23, 2013.

== Death of Chris Kelly ==
On April 29, 2013, Chris Kelly was found unconscious in his Atlanta home and taken to the hospital. Two days later, on May 1, 2013, Kelly was pronounced dead at Atlanta Medical Center. He was 34 years old. According to the police report documents, Kelly had been brought home to recover from his drug use, as he had done several times in the past. His uncle told police that Kelly "had an extensive history of drug abuse."

The following day, producer Jermaine Dupri tweeted a "letter to fans", in which he referred to Kelly as "a son that I never had", and praised Kelly as an artist. Chris Smith wrote, "Chris Kelly was my Best Friend. He was like a brother. I love him and will miss him dearly. Our friendship began as little boys in first grade. We grew up together. It was a blessing to achieve the success, travel the world and entertain Kris Kross fans all around the world with my best friend. It is what we wanted to do and what brought us happiness. I will always cherish the memories of the C-Connection."

Numerous other artists and fans publicly acknowledged Kelly's death, some citing Kris Kross or Kelly as their inspiration or their reason for entering the music industry. On July 1, a toxicology report was released stating that Kelly died from a drug overdose. According to the Fulton County Medical Examiner Office, the toxicology screening showed that Kelly had a mixture of drugs in his system, including heroin and cocaine.

== Discography ==
=== Studio albums ===
| Year | Album detail | Peak chart positions | | | | | | Certifications (sales threshold) |
| Year | Album detail | US | US R&B | AUS | AUT | SWE | UK | Certifications (sales threshold) |
|---|---|---|---|---|---|---|---|---|
| 1992 | Totally Krossed Out: First studio album; Release date: March 31, 1992; Label: Ruffhouse/Columbia Records | 1 | 1 | 7 | 33 | 30 | 31 | AUS: Gold; CAN: 3× Platinum; US: 4× Platinum |
| 1993 | Da Bomb: Second studio album; Release date: August 3, 1993; Label: Ruffhouse/Columbia Records | 13 | 2 | 133 | — | — | — | CAN: Gold; US: Platinum |
| 1996 | Young, Rich & Dangerous: Third studio album; Release date: January 9, 1996; Label: Ruffhouse/Columbia Records | 15 | 2 | — | — | — | — | US: Gold |
"—" denotes releases that did not chart

=== Remix albums ===
| Year | Album details |
|---|---|
| 1996 | Best of Kris Kross Remixed '92 '94 '96: First remix album; Release date: November 26, 1996; Label: Ruffhouse/Columbia Records |

=== Compilation albums ===
| Year | Album details |
|---|---|
| 1998 | Gonna Make U Jump: First compilation album; Release date: April 28, 1998; Label: Sony Music |

=== Singles ===
| Year | Title | Peak chart positions | | | | | | | | | | Certifications (sales threshold) | Album |
| Year | Title | US | AUS | BEL (Fl) | CAN | FRA | IRE | NZ | SWI | SWE | UK | Certifications (sales threshold) | Album |
|---|---|---|---|---|---|---|---|---|---|---|---|---|---|
| 1992 | "Jump" | 1 | 1 | 3 | 11 | 5 | 1 | 1 | 1 | 2 | 2 | RIAA: 2× Platinum; ARIA: Platinum; BPI: Silver; SNEP: Silver | Totally Krossed Out |
| 1992 | "Warm It Up" | 13 | 21 | 21 | — | 44 | 16 | 3 | 34 | 34 | 16 | RIAA: Gold | Totally Krossed Out |
| 1992 | "I Missed the Bus" | 63 | 95 | — | — | — | — | 28 | — | — | 57 | | Totally Krossed Out |
| 1992 | "It's a Shame" | — | — | 35 | — | — | 27 | 19 | — | — | 31 | | Totally Krossed Out |
| 1993 | "Alright" (with Super Cat) | 19 | 97 | — | — | — | — | 8 | — | — | 47 | RIAA: Gold | Da Bomb |
| 1993 | "I'm Real" | 84 | — | — | — | — | — | — | — | — | — | | Da Bomb |
| 1994 | "Da Bomb" (with Da Brat) | — | — | — | — | — | — | — | — | — | — | | Da Bomb |
| 1995 | "Tonite's tha Night" | 12 | 123 | — | — | — | — | 11 | 48 | — | — | RIAA: Gold | Young, Rich, & Dangerous |
| 1996 | "Live and Die for Hip Hop" | 72 | — | — | — | — | — | 30 | — | — | — | | Young, Rich, & Dangerous |
"—" denotes releases that did not chart

== Awards and nominations ==
=== Grammy Awards ===
| Year | Nominated work | Award | Result |
|---|---|---|---|
| 1993 | Kris Kross | Best New Artist | Nominated |
| 1993 | "Jump" | Best Rap Performance by a Duo or Group | Nominated |
