= Warm It Up =

Single by Kris Kross

from the album Totally Krossed Out
- B-side: "Remix"
- Released: June 4, 1992
- Recorded: 1991
- Genre: Hip-hop
- Length: 4:09
- Label: Ruffhouse; Columbia
- Songwriter: Jermaine Mauldin
- Producer: Jermaine Dupri

Kris Kross singles chronology
"Jump" (1992)	"Warm It Up" (1992)	"I Missed the Bus" (1992)

Music video
- "Warm It Up" on YouTube

"Warm It Up" is a song by American hip-hop duo Kris Kross, released in June 1992 by Ruffhouse and Columbia Records as the second single from their debut album, Totally Krossed Out (1992). Written and produced by Jermaine Dupri, the song was released as the follow-up to the duo's multi-platinum chart topping hit, "Jump" on June 4. The song became the second consecutive top 15 hit released from the album, reaching number 13 on the US Billboard Hot 100, and number four in Canada, as well as their second consecutive single to reach number one on the Billboard Rap charts. "Warm It Up" was certified gold on August 8, 1992. The accompanying music video was directed by Rich Murray and was awarded Best Rap Video by a new artist by Billboard magazine in 1992.

== Critical reception ==
Steve Huey from AllMusic stated that the song "is nearly as good" as their debut single. Larry Flick from Billboard magazine wrote, "While it's difficult to imagine anything coming close to matching the astonishing success of 'Jump', this chunky pop/hip-hopper has a decent shot—mostly because it bears a remarkable resemblance to its predecessor. Attitudinal rhymes are matched with fist-waving chorus chants." People Magazine commented, "And cheek the speed at which they spin out their ragamuffin rhymes". They added, "Obviously the tongue matures before the rest of the body." Johnny Dee from Smash Hits noted the "snappy, perky rhymes with plenty of that speedy tongue-twisting rrrrrrapping".

== Track listings ==
- CD maxi
1. "Warm It Up" (Dupri's Mix) (3:53)
2. "Warm It Up" (LP Version) (4:04)
3. "Warm It Up" (Extended Mix) (5:56)
4. "Warm It Up" (Butcher Mix) (3:49)
5. "Warm It Up" (Instrumental) (3:51)
- 12" maxi
1. "Warm It Up" (Butcher Mix) (3:49)
2. "Warm It Up" (Instrumental) (3:51)
3. "Warm It Up" (LP Version) (4:04)
4. "Warm It Up" (Dupri's Mix) (3:53)
5. "Warm It Up" (Extended Mix) (5:56)
- 7" single
1. "Warm It Up" (Dupri's Mix) (3:53)
2. "Warm It Up" (LP Version) (4:04)
- Cassette
1. "Warm It Up" (Dupri's Mix) (3:53)
2. "Warm It Up" (LP Version) (4:04)
3. "Warm It Up" (Butcher's Mix) (3:49)

== Charts ==
=== Weekly charts ===
Chart (1992–93)	Peak position
Australia (ARIA)	21
Belgium (Ultratop 50 Flanders)	21
Canada (The Record)	4
Europe (European Dance Radio)	3
Finland (Suomen virallinen lista)	19
France (SNEP)	44
Germany (GfK)	22
Ireland (IRMA)	16
Netherlands (Dutch Top 40)	21
Netherlands (Single Top 100)	20
New Zealand (Recorded Music NZ)	3
Sweden (Sverigetopplistan)	34
Switzerland (Schweizer Hitparade)	34
UK Singles (Official Charts)	16
UK Dance (Music Week)	8
UK Club Chart (Music Week)	38
US Cash Box Top 100	13
US Billboard Hot 100	13
US Dance Club Songs (Billboard)	23
US Dance Singles Sales (Billboard)	4
US Hot R&B/Hip-Hop Songs (Billboard)	3

=== Year-end charts ===
Chart (1992)	Position
New Zealand (Recorded Music NZ)	36
US Billboard Hot 100	65
US Hot R&B/Hip-Hop Songs (Billboard)	54

=== Certifications ===
Region	Certification	Certified units/sales
United States (RIAA)	Gold	500,000^{^}
^{^} Shipments figures based on certification alone.

== Use of song ==
Former Chicago Cubs player Kris Bryant used Warm It Up as his walk-up music.

The music video was also in season 2, episode 16 of Beavis and Butt-Head titled "Lawn and Garden".
