= Jump (Kris Kross song) =

1992 single by Kris Kross

Single by Kris Kross

from the album Totally Krossed Out
- B-side: "Lil' Boys in Da Hood"
- Released: February 6, 1992
- Recorded: 1991
- Genre: Pop, hip-hop, pop rap
- Length: 3:17 (radio edit); 5:09 (extended mix)
- Label: Ruffhouse; Columbia
- Songwriters: Jermaine Mauldin; Joe Nicolo; Larry Mizell; Alphonso Mizell; Roy Hammond; Berry Gordy; Freddie Perren; Deke Richards; Leroy Bonner; Marshall Jones; Walter Morrison; Ralph Middlebrooks; Bruce Napier; Marvin Pierce; Gregory Webster; Clarence Satchell; Walter Morris; Marvin Pierre; Senen Reyes; Louis Freese; Lawrence Muggerud; Lowell Fulson; Jimmy McCracklin; James Brown; Anthony Criss; Kier Gist; Vincent Brown; Herb Rooney
- Producer: Jermaine Dupri

Kris Kross singles chronology
"Jump" (1992)	"Warm It Up" (1992)

Music video
- "Jump" on YouTube

"Jump" is a song by American hip-hop duo Kris Kross, released on February 6, 1992 by Ruffhouse and Columbia Records, as their first single from their debut studio album, Totally Krossed Out (1992). It was produced by Jermaine Dupri and Joe "The Butcher" Nicolo, and achieved international success, topping charts in Switzerland, Australia, and the United States. Additionally, it was the third-best-selling song of 1992 in the United States, with sales of 2,079,000 physical copies that year. The song's accompanying music video was directed by Rich Murray and filmed in Atlanta. Billboard magazine featured "Jump" in their lists of "Billboard's Top Songs of the '90s" in 2019 and "500 Best Pop Songs of All Time" in 2023.

== Chart performance ==
"Jump" was very successful on the charts all over the world and remains the duo's biggest hit. In Europe, the song reached number-one in Finland, Ireland and Switzerland, as well as on the Eurochart Hot 100. It peaked at number two in Denmark, Germany, Norway, the Netherlands, Sweden and the United Kingdom. Additionally, the single entered the top 10 also in Austria (7), Belgium (3), France (5), Greece (6) and Italy (5). In the UK, it peaked in its second week at the UK Singles Chart, on May 31, 1992. It was held off the top by KWS' cover song "Please Don't Go". Outside Europe, "Jump" went to number-one in Australia, Canada, New Zealand, Zimbabwe and on both the Billboard Hot 100 and the Billboard Hot Rap Songs chart in the United States. The song kept Queen's "Bohemian Rhapsody", En Vogue's "My Lovin' (You're Never Gonna Get It)" and the Red Hot Chili Peppers' "Under the Bridge" from the top spot on the Billboard Hot 100, in which all three songs peaked at number two. It was the fastest-selling single in fifteen years and stayed on top of the Hot 100 for eight weeks. In West Asia, "Jump" became a top-10 hit also in Israel, peaking at number nine on June 2, 1992.

It was awarded with a silver record in France and both a platinum record and a 2× platinum record in the US. Kris Kross's debut album Totally Krossed Out, which features "Jump", sold over four million copies. At the time of its eight-week run, it was the longest running No. 1 since The Police's "Every Breath You Take" spent eight weeks at No. 1 in the summer of 1983. On July 23, 2021 the single was certified Silver by the British Phonographic Industry in the UK.

== Reception ==
Steve Huey from AllMusic called the song "irresistible", adding, "actually, the miggeda-miggeda-mack bit proves they're not bad rappers". J.D. Considine from The Baltimore Sun felt "it's the musical maturity they show that makes them seem dope beyond their years", noting the "reggae-inflected cadences" of "Jump". Larry Flick from Billboard magazine wrote that this "energetic pop/hip-hopper showcases fast-talking, baby-voiced male rappers that may initially draw comparisons to Another Bad Creation." He also described the song as "radio-friendly" and "melodic". Clark and DeVaney from Cashbox commented, "For such young guys, they deliver some pretty impressive lyrics and have a slammin' music track on their debut single. You can be sure to hear more from this group in the near future." James Bernard from Entertainment Weekly noted, "Play the group’s hyperactive platinum single ”Jump” at any party and watch the floors quake. To their credit, the two rappers don’t rely on their production team’s musical prowess. Smith (who calls himself Daddy Mack) and Kelly (Mack Daddy) grip their microphones with so much confidence that if they didn’t sound so youthful, you might forget they’re just barely out of grade school." Dave Sholin from the Gavin Report stated, "These two twelve year-olds from Atlanta are about to bounce in only one direction—to the top of the chart." Bruce Britt from Los Angeles Daily News described the song as "bubble gum rap".

Dennis Hunt from Los Angeles Times said it "is high quality--like just about everything on the album." Another Los Angeles Times editor, Robert Hilburn, wrote, "A classic slice of teen exuberance, also dressed up in today’s dance-minded hip-hop sparkle." Pan-European magazine Music & Media remarked that "these 12-year-old boys have formed a real rap posse. They sound as determined as Michael Jackson at that age." Alan Jones from Music Week stated that "against an unusually fresh and eclectic backdrop, the two 13-year-old rappers make a highly infectious noise incorporating some ragga influences". A reviewer from People Magazine felt that "their best trick is inserting catchily melodic refrains in the middle of their free-stylin' raps. That should help them kross over to pop. And cheek the speed at which they spin out their ragamuffin rhymes on "Jump" and "Warm It Up". Obviously the tongue matures before the rest of the body." James Hamilton from the Record Mirror Dance Update deemed it a "jaunty "jump, jump" prodded jiggly lurcher". Hannah Ford from Select wrote that it is "a beautiful hip hop track that gets your goose bumps quacking. It's Public Enemy's wailing sax break with Naughty By Nature's b-line." Bunny Sawyer from Smash Hits gave it five out of five, commenting, "Their tune's a work of hip-hop genius that comes complete with easy-peasy dance steps to make us all look as cross as them." An editor of Sunday Tribune described it as a "infectious rallying cry".

== Music video ==
A music video was produced to promote the single, directed by Rich Murray. It featured the duo's unique hip hop fashion style and was heavily rotated on Music Television channels. Murray shot the video in Atlanta for a fee of $21,000. At the time of filming, it snowed in Atlanta for the first time in 20 years and they experienced significant snowfall. Murray would also be directing the video for the duo's next single, "Warm It Up". "Jump" was later made available by Vevo on YouTube in 2010, and it had generated more than 157 million views as of early 2024. The video also appeared in the Sega video game Make My Video: Kris Kross.

== Impact and legacy ==
"Jump" ranked number 75 on "VH1's 100 Greatest Songs of the 90's", and number two on their "Child Stars" Top 10 list. In 2004, Q magazine featured the song in their list of "The 1010 Songs You Must Own". In 2010, Blender listed it number 373 on its list of "Greatest Songs Since You Were Born". The same year, the song (mislabeled as "Jump, Jump") was ranked at No. 34 on the list of the 100 Worst Songs Ever by Matthew Wilkening of AOL Radio, who tells the reader not to blame the kids of Kris Kross, but to look behind the curtain for Treach and Dupri, whom he labeled as "true villains". In 2019, Billboard placed it at number 97 in their ranking of "Billboard's Top Songs of the '90s". Four years later, the magazine ranked it number 347 in their "500 Best Pop Songs of All Time". In February 2024, Billboard ranked "Jump" number 34 in their "The 100 Greatest Jock Jams of All Time".

== Track listings ==
- 7" single Columbia
1. "Jump" – 3:17
2. "Lil' Boys in Da Hood" – 3:04
- CD single
1. "Jump" – 3:17
2. "Lil' Boys in Da Hood" – 3:04
- 12" maxi – US
1. "Jump" (radio edit) – 3:17
2. "Jump" (extended mix) – 5:09
3. "Jump" (instrumental mix) – 3:17
4. "Lil Boys in Da Hood" – 3:04
- 12" maxi – US
1. "Jump" (super cat mix) – 4:35
2. "Jump" (instrumental) – 3:32
3. "Jump" (extended dance mix) – 6:47
4. "Jump" (super cat dessork mix) – 3:52
- CD maxi – US
1. "Jump" (extended dance mix) – 6:52
2. "Jump" (super cat dessork mix) – 3:54
3. "Jump" (super cat mix) – 4:37
4. "Jump" (instrumental) – 3:33
- CD maxi – Germany
1. "Jump" (radio edit) – 3:17
2. "Jump" (extended mix) – 5:09
3. "Jump" (instrumental mix) – 3:17
4. "Lil Boys in Da Hood" – 3:04
- Cassette
1. "Jump" (radio edit) – 3:17
2. "Lil' Boys in Da Hood" – 3:04
3. "Jump" (radio edit) – 3:17
4. "Lil' Boys in Da Hood" – 3:04

== Charts ==
=== Weekly charts ===
Chart (1992)	Peak position
Australia (ARIA)	1
Austria (Ö3 Austria Top 40)	7
Belgium (Ultratop 50 Flanders)	3
Canada Retail Singles (The Record)	1
Canada Top Singles (RPM)	11
Canada Dance/Urban (RPM)	1
Denmark (IFPI)	2
Ecuador (UPI)	2
Europe (Eurochart Hot 100 Singles)	1
Europe (European Dance Radio)	1
Finland (Suomen virallinen lista)	1
France (SNEP)	5
Germany (GfK)	2
Greece (IFPI)	6
Ireland (IRMA)	1
Israel (Israeli Singles Chart)	9
Italy (Musica e dischi)	5
Netherlands (Dutch Top 40)	2
Netherlands (Single Top 100)	2
New Zealand (Recorded Music NZ)	1
Norway (VG-lista)	2
Sweden (Sverigetopplistan)	2
Switzerland (Schweizer Hitparade)	1
UK Singles (Official Charts)	2
UK Airplay (Music Week)	16
UK Dance (Music Week)	2
UK Club Chart (Music Week)	11
US Billboard Hot 100	1
US Dance Club Songs (Billboard)	13
US Dance Singles Sales (Billboard)	2
US Hot R&B/Hip-Hop Songs (Billboard)	2
US Hot Rap Songs (Billboard)	1
US Cash Box Top 100	1
Zimbabwe (ZIMA)	1

2004 weekly chart performance for Jump
Chart (2004)	Peak position
UK Dance (Official Charts)	20

2013 weekly chart performance for Jump
Chart (2013)	Peak position
UK Hip Hop/R&B (Official Charts)	39

=== Year-end charts ===
Chart (1992)	Rank
Australia (ARIA)	12
Brazil (Crowley)	45
Europe (European Dance Radio)	22
Germany (Media Control)	18
Israel (Israeli Singles Chart)	41
Netherlands (Dutch Top 40)	20
Netherlands (Single Top 100)	14
New Zealand (RIANZ)	8
Sweden (Topplistan)	17
Switzerland (Schweizer Hitparade)	28
UK Singles (OCC)	25
US Billboard Hot 100	3
US Hot R&B Singles (Billboard)	23
US Cash Box Top 100	4

=== Decade-end charts ===
Decade-end chart performance for "Jump" by Kris Kross
Chart (1990–1999)	Position
Canada (Nielsen SoundScan)	34
US Billboard Hot 100	23

== Certifications ==
Region	Certification	Certified units/sales
France (SNEP)	Silver	125,000^{*}
New Zealand (RMNZ)	Gold	5,000^{*}
United Kingdom (BPI)	Silver	200,000^{‡}
United States (RIAA)	2× Platinum	2,000,000^{^}
United States (RIAA) video single	2× Platinum	100,000^{^}
^{*} Sales figures based on certification alone.^{^} Shipments figures based on certification alone.^{‡} Sales+streaming figures based on certification alone.
