= Jermaine Dupri =

American record producer (born 1972)

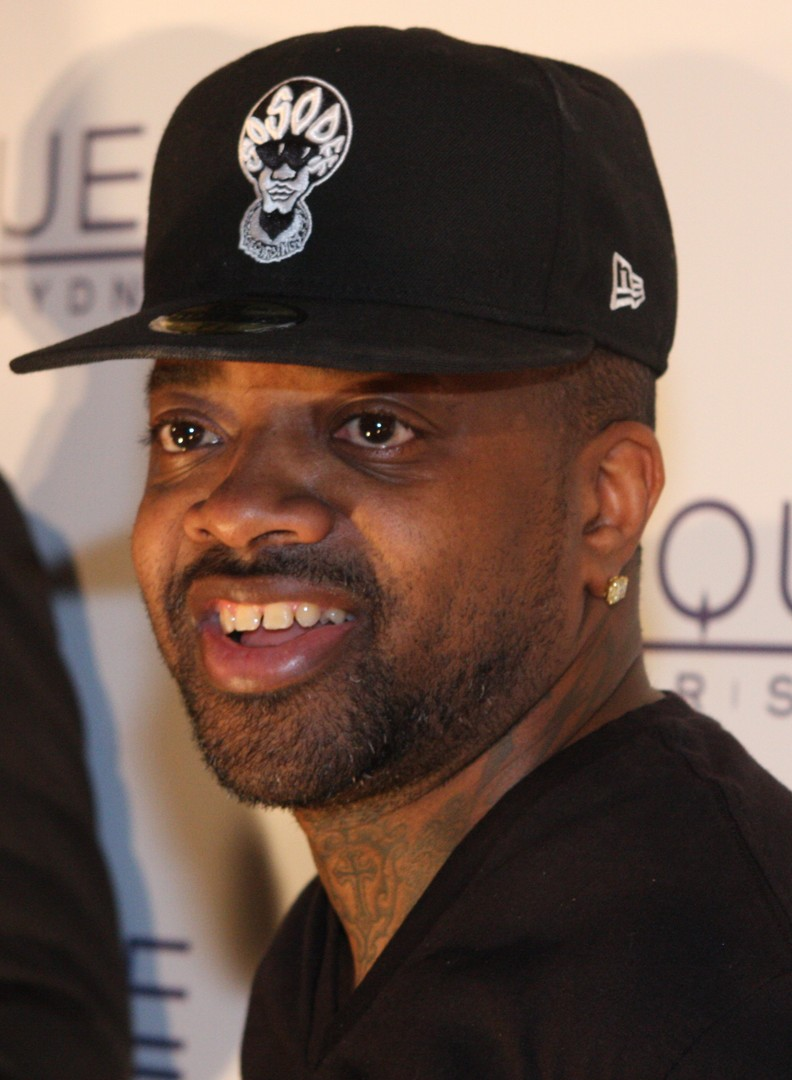
- Dupri in 2012
- Born: Jermaine Dupri Mauldin; September 23, 1972 (age 54); Asheville, North Carolina, U.S.
- Other names: JD; Don Chi Chi
- Occupations: Record producer; rapper; songwriter; disc jockey; record executive; entrepreneur
- Years active: 1984–present
- Works: Discography; production; videography
- Partner: Janet Jackson (2002–2009)
- Children: 2
- Father: Michael Mauldin
- Awards: Full list
- Musical career
- Origin: Atlanta, Georgia, U.S.
- Genres: Hip-hop; R&B
- Labels: So So Def; Columbia; Arista; Def Jam; Island Urban Music; Virgin
- Member of: Ocean's 7
- Website: global14.com

Jermaine Dupri Mauldin (born September 23, 1972) is an American record producer, rapper, songwriter and record executive. Raised in Atlanta, Georgia, as the son of Columbia Records executive Michael Mauldin, he began his musical career at the age of 9. He discovered the teen hip-hop duo Kris Kross in 1991; Dupri wrote and produced their 1992 single "Jump", which peaked atop the Billboard Hot 100 and was named the 23rd most successful song of that decade. He established his own record label, So So Def Recordings, in a joint venture with Columbia the following year. The label has since signed acts including Xscape, Bow Wow, Da Brat, Jagged Edge, Dem Franchize Boyz, YoungBloodZ, and Anthony Hamilton, among others.

In his R&B and hip-hop production career, Dupri worked with Mariah Carey, Usher, Monica, and Nelly to produce a total of 11 number-one singles on the Billboard Hot 100. As a solo recording artist, his debut studio album, Life in 1472 (1998), peaked at number three on the Billboard 200 and was supported by the top 40 single "The Party Continues" (featuring Da Brat and Usher) and the Grammy Award-nominated "Money Ain't a Thang" (featuring Jay-Z). His second album, Instructions (2001), peaked at number 15 on the Billboard 200 and spawned his second top 40 single, "Welcome to Atlanta" (featuring Ludacris).

In 2013, Dupri replaced Randy Jackson as Mariah Carey's talent manager. He co-created the reality television series The Rap Game with Queen Latifah in 2015. He has won a Grammy Award from 12 nominations.

== Early life ==
Jermaine Dupri Mauldin was born on September 23, 1972, in Asheville, North Carolina, the son of Tina (née Mosley) and Michael Mauldin, a Columbia Records executive, and grew up in College Park, Georgia. Dupri's artistic career began when he was 9 years old. His father, an Atlanta talent manager, had coordinated a Diana Ross concert in 1982; to the delight of concertgoers, Dupri managed to get on-stage and dance along with Ross. Dupri got his start as a dancer for the hip-hop group Whodini when he was 12. He made an appearance in their music video for the song "Freaks Come Out at Night". He began performing around the country, appearing with Herbie Hancock and Cameo before he opened the New York Fresh Festival with Run-DMC, Whodini, and Grandmaster Flash.

== Career ==
=== 1990–1996: Early career and breakthrough ===
In 1990, he produced his first act, the female hip-hop trio Silk Tymes Leather. He later formed the teen duo Kris Kross (Chris "Mac Daddy" Kelly and Chris "Daddy Mac" Smith) after meeting the boys at a local mall in 1991. The group's first album, Totally Krossed Out, was released in 1992 and went multi-platinum due to the success of their singles "Jump" and "Warm It Up", both written and produced by Dupri. He established his own record label, So So Def Recordings, in 1993. Shortly after, he discovered R&B girl group Xscape at a festival in Atlanta and signed them to the label. Their debut album, Hummin' Comin' at 'Cha, produced entirely by Dupri, went platinum with the support of the singles "Understanding", "Love on My Mind", "Tonight", and "Just Kickin' It", with the latter peaking at number 2 on the Billboard Hot 100. During the same year, on Yo! MTV Raps, he met Da Brat through Kris Kross and signed her to So So Def, releasing her debut album Funkdafied (1994), which went platinum. So So Def entered into a distribution partnership with Columbia Records in 1993. In 1995, he collaborated with Mariah Carey for the first time on the number one hit single "Always Be My Baby". He contributed to Lil' Kim's 1996 album Hard Core on the track "Not Tonight". That same year, he produced and co-wrote singles for MC Lyte ("Keep On Keepin' On"), the Braxtons ("So Many Ways"), and Whodini ("Keep Running Back"). Also in 1996, Dupri linked up with Kris Kross one last time for their third and final studio album Young, Rich & Dangerous, producing the entire album, as well as its moderately successful singles, "Tonite's tha Night" and "Live and Die for Hip Hop".

=== 1997–2003: Columbia and Arista Records ===
In 1997, Dupri co-wrote and produced several tracks on Usher's second album, My Way. The lead single, "You Make Me Wanna...", reached number one on the Rhythmic Top 40 and Hot R&B/Hip-Hop Songs charts. The follow-up single, "Nice & Slow", went to number one on the Billboard Hot 100 and Hot R&B/Hip-Hop Songs charts, and the last single, "My Way", peaked at number two on Billboard Hot 100. All three singles have been certified Platinum by Recording Industry Association of America (RIAA). A featured guest on the album, Monica, would also later become a protégé of Dupri, with her second album, The Boy Is Mine, dropping in July 1998. Dupri produced the single of the album, "The First Night", which peaked atop the U.S. Billboard charts, with the album receiving triple platinum certification and universal acclaim from critics.

In 1998, Dupri was involved in the release of Destiny's Child's eponymous debut album, producing and co-writing the track "With Me Part I". Dupri renewed the focus on his own music career, which proved successful with release of the singles "Sweetheart" (featuring Mariah Carey), "The Party Continues" (featuring Da Brat and Usher), and "Money Ain't a Thang" (featuring Jay-Z), the three singles from his debut studio album Life in 1472. The album was certified platinum by the RIAA a month and a half after release. Also, that year he met soon-to-be frequent collaborator and production partner Bryan-Michael Cox, as well as 11-year-old rapper, known then as Lil' Bow Wow and signed him to So So Def. The two would later part ways after only two albums but continued to frequently collaborate on later projects. The distribution deal with Columbia was terminated in 2002, with Dupri switching to Arista Records in 2003. Dupri worked on Tamar Braxton's debut album Tamar on the track "Get None", as well as with Weezer and Lil Wayne on the song "Can't Stop Partying". He also collaborated with DJ Chuckie and Lil Jon to make a vocal version of the song "Let the Bass Kick". He soon released his sophomore studio album Instructions in October 2001, featuring the single "Welcome to Atlanta" (featuring Ludacris), and containing a myriad of features (similar to his debut).

=== 2004–2009: Confessions and The Emancipation of Mimi ===
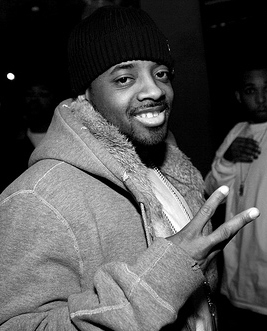
Dupri in 2005

In 2004, Dupri connected again with Usher contributing to Confessions co-writing and co-producing three consecutive singles Billboard Hot 100 number one songs "Burn", "Confessions Part II", and "My Boo". Confessions won a Grammy Award for Best Contemporary R&B Album and "My Boo" won for Best R&B Performance by a Duo or Group with Vocals. The album has been certified diamond by the RIAA and, as of 2012, has sold 10 million copies in the US and over 20 million copies worldwide.

In early 2005, Dupri reunited with Mariah Carey on her tenth studio album The Emancipation of Mimi, which features the hit "We Belong Together". The album also featured the hit singles "It's Like That", "Shake It Off", and "Don't Forget About Us". "We Belong Together" stayed at number one for fourteen non-consecutive weeks, becoming the second longest running number one song in US chart history, behind Carey's 1996 collaboration with Boyz II Men, "One Sweet Day". "We Belong Together" won two Grammy Awards for Best Female R&B Vocal Performance and Best R&B Song. Later in 2005, when he worked on Bow Wow's album Wanted, he co-produced and co-wrote the Hot 100 top 5 singles "Let Me Hold You" and "Like You". That December, Dupri produced and co-wrote Nelly's single "Grillz", which struck atop the Billboard charts yet again.

In early 2006, Dupri signed both Dem Franchize Boyz and Daz Dillinger to So So Def after transferring it from Arista to Virgin Records. The latter's album, So So Gangsta, was released in September of that year, while the former's label debut was released the following year with the album On Top of Our Game which topped the US Top Rap Albums chart with the hit songs "I Think They Like Me" and "Lean wit It, Rock wit It." The group also featured alongside Dupri on Monica's single "Everytime tha Beat Drop" off her fifth album The Makings of Me. In late 2006, Dupri executive produced the album 20 Y.O. by his then-partner Janet Jackson, co-producing and co-writing half the tracklist and all of the singles. He returned for her tenth album Discipline in 2008, producing the single "Rock with U".

In 2007, Dupri produced singles for Paul Wall ("I'm Throwed"), Donell Jones ("Better Start Talking"), and Bone Thugs-n-Harmony ("Lil' L.O.V.E."), as well as multiple tracks for labelmate Jagged Edge. In October 2007, he published his memoir, Young, Rich and Dangerous: The Making of a Music Mogul via Atria Books. In November 2007, he co-produced and co-wrote with So So Def intern No I.D. on Jay-Z's tenth studio album American Gangster, contributing to the songs "Success" and "Fallin'".

In 2008, Dupri reunited with Usher, Mariah Carey, and then-girlfriend Janet Jackson for their studio albums, Here I Stand, E=MC², and Discipline, respectively, producing multiple tracks on each. He also produced singles for Ashanti ("Good Good") and Nelly ("Stepped on My J'z").

In 2009, Dupri produced singles for Fabolous ("Money Goes, Honey Stay (When the Money Goes Remix)") and Bow Wow ("Roc the Mic").

=== 2010–present: The Rap Game ===
On October 7, 2013, he replaced Randy Jackson as Mariah Carey's talent manager. He later parted ways with Carey in August 2014, though they still maintain a professional relationship, as he was a producer on nearly all of her albums since Daydream (1995).

In 2014, Dupri produced multiple tracks for Mariah Carey and Jagged Edge on their respective albums, Me. I Am Mariah... The Elusive Chanteuse and J.E. Heartbreak 2.

In 2015, Dupri and Queen Latifah created the reality television series The Rap Game. The eight-episode series premiered on Lifetime on January 1, 2016. It followed five emerging artists, ages 11 to 16, who were immersed in the Atlanta hip-hop scene in a quest to become a rap star. Dupri was joined by guests including Usher, Ludacris, Da Brat, T.I., and Silentó; they gave the competitors advice on what it takes to be in the industry.

In 2018, he was inducted into the Songwriters Hall of Fame. This made Dupri the second musician from the hip-hop genre to be inducted, with only Jay-Z being inducted prior.

Also in 2018, Dupri and So So Def celebrated an exhibit at the Grammy Museum in Los Angeles, California, Jermaine Dupri & So So Def, 25 Years of Elevating Culture.

In 2022, Dupri produced "If I Get Caught" by R&B duo Dvsn. On February 9, 2024, Dupri released the single "This Lil' Game We Play" (featuring Nelly, Ashanti and Juicy J).

== Personal life ==
He has two daughters; his elder daughter, Shaniah Mauldin, with Pam Sweat, appeared on the reality television series Growing Up Hip Hop: Atlanta.

From September 2002 to 2009, Dupri was involved in a romantic relationship with singer Janet Jackson, which resulted in a brief musical connection.

Dupri is vegan and promoted the lifestyle through a PETA advertisement, encouraging fans to "Feel the beets. Lose the meats."

Dupri endorsed Kamala Harris in the 2024 United States presidential election.

== Discography ==
Studio albums

- Life in 1472 (1998)
- Instructions (2001)
- Magic City (2025)

== Awards and nominations ==
Grammy Awards

Year	Nominated work	Award	Result
1996	Daydream (as producer)	Album of the Year	Nominated
1999	Life in 1472	Best Rap Album	Nominated
1999	"Money Ain't a Thang"	Best Rap Performance by a Duo or Group	Nominated
2000	FanMail (as producer)	Album of the Year	Nominated
2005	Confessions (as producer)	Album of the Year	Nominated
2005	"My Boo"	Best R&B Song	Nominated
2005	"Burn"	Best R&B Song	Nominated
2006	The Emancipation of Mimi (as producer)	Album of the Year	Nominated
2006	"We Belong Together" (as producer and songwriter)	Record of the Year	Nominated
2006	"We Belong Together" (as producer and songwriter)	Song of the Year	Nominated
2006	"We Belong Together" (as producer and songwriter)	Best R&B Song	Won
2007	"Don't Forget About Us"	Best R&B Song	Nominated
