= Dem Franchize Boyz discography =

- Studio albums: 3
- Singles: 6

This is the discography of hip-hop group Dem Franchize Boyz. It consists of three studio albums and six singles.

The group released their debut album, Dem Franchize Boyz, in September 2004. It failed to reach success in the U.S., failing to enter the Top 100 of the Billboard 200. The albums lone single, "White Tee", reached #79 on the Billboard Hot 100.

It was their second album that saw mainstream success. In 2005 they released "I Think They Like Me", the first single from their second album, On Top of Our Game. The single became a top 15 hit on the Hot 100 and a number-one single on the Hot R&B/Hip-Hop Songs and Hot Rap Tracks charts. The single was also certified Gold by the Recording Industry Association of America. On Top of Our Game was released in February 2006, charted within the top 5 of the pop charts and debuted at number one on the Top Rap Albums chart. "Lean wit It, Rock wit It", the album's second single, became their highest charting single on the Hot 100, where it reached a peak of number seven. It was certified Platinum in the United States. A third and final single from the album, "Ridin' Rims", failed to chart in the top 40.

Their third and final album, Our World, Our Way, was released in September 2008, and failed to match the success of its precedesser. It failed to make the top 100 of the Billboard 200, and no single released made the Hot 100. The group eventually went into hiatus in 2008, after being dropped from E1 Music.

== Albums ==
=== Studio albums ===
List of albums, with selected chart positions and certifications
Title	Album details	Peak chart positions			Certifications
Title	Album details	US	US R&B	US Rap	Certifications
Dem Franchize Boyz	Released: September 14, 2004; Label: Universal; Format: CD, digital download	106	18	—	
On Top of Our Game	Released: February 7, 2006; Label: So So Def, Virgin; Format: CD, digital download	5	2	1	RIAA: Gold
Our World, Our Way	Released: September 30, 2008; Label: E1; Format: CD, digital download	118	19	10	
"—" denotes a recording that did not chart.

== Singles ==
=== As lead artist ===
List of singles, with selected chart positions, showing year released and album name
Title	Year	Peak chart positions							Certifications	Album
Title	Year	US	US R&B	US Rap	AUS	FIN	NZ	UK	Certifications	Album
"White Tee"	2004	79	25	23	—	—	—	—		Dem Franchize Boyz
"I Think They Like Me" (featuring Jermaine Dupri, Da Brat and Bow Wow)	2005	15	1	1	—	5	27	66	RIAA: Gold	On Top of Our Game
"Lean wit It, Rock wit It" (featuring Lil Peanut and Charlay)	2006	7	2	1	52	—	12	158	RIAA: Platinum	On Top of Our Game
"Ridin' Rims"	2006	80	40	22	—	—	—	—		On Top of Our Game
"Talkin' Out da Side of Ya Neck!"	2008	—	71	—	—	—	—	—		Our World, Our Way
"Turn Heads" (featuring Lloyd)	2008	—	75	—	—	—	—	—	RMNZ: Gold	Our World, Our Way
"—" denotes a recording that did not chart or was not released in that territory.

=== As featured performer ===
List of singles, with selected chart positions, showing year released and album name
Title	Year	Peak chart positions		Album
Title	Year	US	US R&B	Album
"Everytime tha Beat Drop" (Monica featuring Dem Franchize Boyz)	2006	48	11	The Makings of Me
"Pimped Out" (Brooke Valentine featuring Dem Franchize Boyz)	2006	—	87	Physical Education: The Mixtape
"—" denotes a recording that did not chart.
