= Ocean's 7 =

Rap group

- Also known as: Ocean's 5 (1989–present)
- Genres: Hip hop; hip hop soul; R&B; pop
- Occupations: Record producers, vocalists, songwriters
- Years active: 1989–present
- Labels: So Do Def; Columbia; Noontime
- Members: Jermaine Dupri; Bryan-Michael Cox; Johntá Austin; Tyrone Davis; Trey Songz; Usher; Nelly

Ocean's 7 is an American musical collective composed of singer-songwriters, record producers, and rappers consisted of Jermaine Dupri, Bryan Michael-Cox, Johntá Austin, Usher, Nelly, Trey Songz, and Dupri's assistant Tyrone. The group released the mixtape 3000 And 9 Shit, on May 5, 2009. Formed by Dupri in 1989, the group was modeled after the Rat Pack in the film Ocean's 11. Like the Rat Pack, the group's initial members, Dupri, Michael-Cox, and Austin are all associates and have teamed up to write and produce various hit singles for several artists in their careers.

Often the team works together or just in a pairing. Their most notable productions are "U Got It Bad", "Burn" "Confessions Part II" by fellow member Usher, "Be Without You" by Mary J. Blige, "Everytime tha Beat Drop", "Love All Over Me" by Monica, "Like You", "Outta My System" and "Shorty Like Mine" by Bow Wow, and "We Belong Together", "Don't Forget About Us", "It's Like That", "Shake It Off", "I Stay in Love" and "You Don't Know What to Do" for Mariah Carey.

== History ==
The group was assembled by Jermaine Durpi. In an interview with the Boombox "As far as the name of the group it was something that we just accidentally [started] doing by hanging out and working together. Together Dupri and Michael-Cox were in Las Vegas working on the Here I Stand album for Usher and after they would record they would get dressed up often wearing Tom Ford and going to clubs. Dupri noticed restaurants began treating them differently because they were all dressed up. Dupri on his video blog Living The Life on Youtube he would record and release episodes of the group in the studio often going out on the town, being in the recording studio and other times talking about life topics. The group started as the Ocean's 5 eventually adding Nelly and Trey Songz to the group they became the Ocean's 7. A visiting member of the group included rapper Bow Wow.

== Members ==
- Jermaine Dupri – Executive Producer, Writing Production, Rapper, Arrangement
- Johnta Austin – Executive Producer, Writing, Production, Vocals, Arrangement
- Bryan Michael-Cox – Production, Song Writing, Vocals, Arrangement
- Usher – Vocals, Executive Producer, Song Writing, Arrangement
- Trey Songz – Vocals, Song Writing
- Nelly – Rapper, Song Writing
- Tyrone – Assistant

== Discography ==
=== Mixtapes ===
- 3000 and 9 Shit (2009)

== Production discography ==
=== Singles ===
- 1999: "Keys to the Range" (featuring Jermaine Dupri) by Jagged Edge
- 1999: "He Can't Love U" by Jagged Edge
- 1999: "Let's Get Married" by Jagged Edge
- 1999: "What'chu Like" by Da Brat
- 2000: Goodbye by Jagged Edge
- 2000: I Got it 2 by Jagged Edge
- 2000: "Promise" by Jagged Edge
- 2000: "Just Be a Man About It" by Toni Braxton
- 2000: "Puppy Love" by Lil' Bow Wow
- 2001: "U Got it Bad" by Usher
- 2001: "U-Turn" by Usher
- 2001: "Where the Party At?" by Jagged Edge
- 2002: "Take Ya Home" by Bow Wow
- 2002: Don't Mess with My Man by Nivea
- 2004: "Burn" by Usher
- 2004: "Confessions Part II" by Usher
- 2004: "My Boo" by Usher featuring Alicia Keys
- 2005: "It's Like That" by Mariah Carey
- 2005: "We Belong Together" by Mariah Carey
- 2005: "Shake It Off" by Mariah Carey
- 2005: "Be Without You" by Mary J. Blige
- 2005: "Get Your Number" by Mariah Carey
- 2005: "Don't Forget About Us" by Mariah Carey
- 2006: "Everytime The Beat Drops" by Monica
- 2006: "Call on Me" by Janet Jackson featuring Nelly
- 2006: "So Excited" by Janet Jackson featuring Khia
- 2007: "Outta My System" by Bow Wow
- 2007: "Shortie Like Mine" by Bow Wow featuring Chris Brown and Johntá Austin
- 2007: "Put a Little Umph in It" by Jagged Edge featuring Ashanti
- 2009: "I Need a Girl" by Trey Songz
- 2010: "Love All Over Me" by Monica
- 2010: "Oh Santa!" by Mariah Carey
- 2017: "I Don't" by Mariah Carey featuring YG
- 2020: "Don't Waste My Time" by Usher featuring Ella Mai
- 2021: "Pressure" by Ari Lennox
- 2022: "If I Get Caught" by Dvsn
