= The Makings of Me =

Studio album by Monica
- Released: October 3, 2006
- Recorded: 2003–2006
- Genre: R&B
- Length: 40:01
- Labels: Worldwide; J; Arista
- Producers: Jermaine Dupri; Craig Brockman; Miguel Castro; Bryan Michael Cox; Anthony Dent; Missy Elliott; Sean Garrett; Cliff Jones; Lamb; Harold Lilly; David Lindsey; LRoc; The Runners; Manuel Seal; Swizz Beatz; Steve Russell; Tank; The Underdogs

Monica chronology
After the Storm (2003)	The Makings of Me (2006)	Still Standing (2010)

Singles from The Makings of Me
- 1. "Everytime tha Beat Drop" Released: July 24, 2006; 2. "A Dozen Roses (You Remind Me)" Released: September 5, 2006; 3. "Sideline Ho" Released: September 19, 2006; 4. "Hell No (Leave Home)" Released: May 14, 2007

The Makings of Me is the fifth studio album by American singer Monica. It was released by Worldwide Entertainment, J Records and Arista Records on October 3, 2006, in the United States. Built upon the hip hop, gospel and modern quiet storm styles of its predecessor, After the Storm (2003), Monica envisioned her follow-up project to sound as close knit and intimate as her previous project. Consequently, she enlisted frequent collaborators Missy Elliott, Bryan Michael Cox, and Jermaine Dupri to work with her on the album, with the latter serving as its executive producer, as well as new partners such as The Underdogs, Tank, The Runners, LRoc, Swizz Beatz, and Sean Garrett.

The album was released to mostly positive reception from music critics, who applauded Monicas's vocal performances and cited the album a solid addition to her catalogue. Criticism mainly targeted the trendchasing character of snap-influenced lead single "Everytime tha Beat Drop", as well as the album's occasionally unremarkable production. The Makings of Me debuted at number eight on the US Billboard 200 and topped the Billboard's Top R&B/Hip-Hop Albums chart—becoming her first album to do so, with first week sales of 93,000 copies. As of 2010 the album has sold 328,000 copies, according to Billboard.

The Makings of Me produced four commercial singles, with "Everytime tha Beat Drop", a collaboration with rap group Dem Franchize Boyz, becoming the album's only entry on the Billboard Hot 100. Subsequent singles such as "A Dozen Roses (You Remind Me)" and "Sideline Ho" failed to chart on the Hot 100 or sell noticeably on any other chart. Disappointed by its performance, Monica later expressed her discontent of the album's promotional campaign. The Makings of Me earned a Soul Train Music Award nomination in the Best R&B/Soul Album – Female category and was reissued in April 2007, featuring free ringtones for "The First Night", a free cellphone wallpaper, and a blow-in card was sold by Walmart.

== Background ==
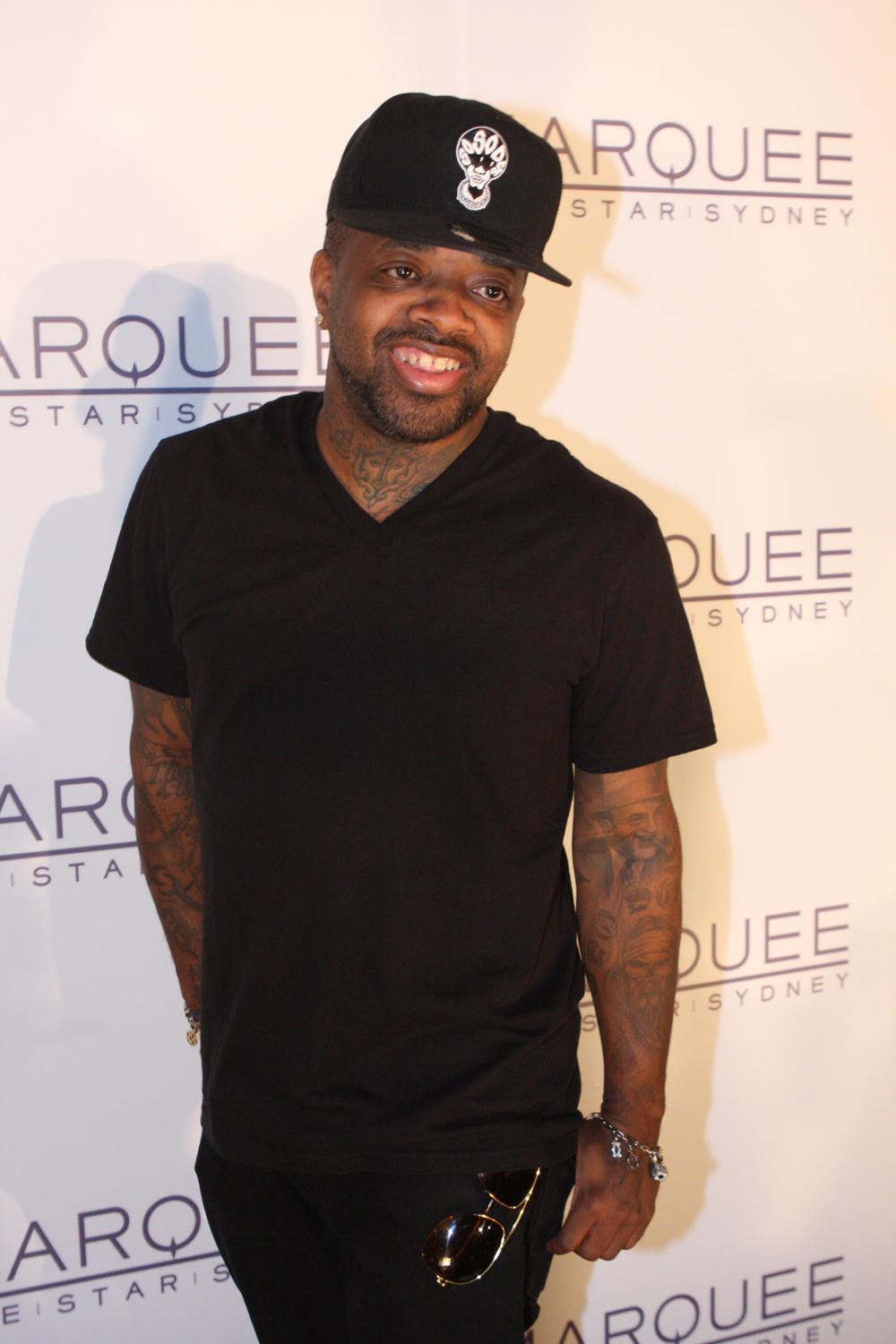
Jermaine Dupri reteamed with Monica to executive produce The Makings of Me.

In June 2003, following several revamps and numerous delays, J Records released Monica's fourth studio album After the Storm in the United States. It debuted at number one on the US Billboard 200, her first album to do so, and produced three singles that attained Billboard chart success, including chart topper "So Gone". The following year, she announced that she was expecting her first child. While most of her fifth album was not recorded before the birth of her son Rocko in May 2005, the singer met several producers and songwriters in preparation of her album during her pregnancy, involving Missy Elliott and her regular co-producers Cainon Lamb and Craig Brockman as well as Bryan Michael Cox and Jermaine Dupri, with Dupri again taking over executive production duties alongside Monica after Elliott had replaced him in this position on After the Storm following the retooling of original album All Eyez on Me (2002).

While both Elliott and Dupri contributed most to the album, Monica was anxious to keep the number of collaborators close knit and intimate and thus, settled on working with a small amount of additional producers, including Sean Garrett, Harold Lilly, Swizz Beatz, Tank and The Underdogs. In total, their sessions resulted in forty finished records. At different times, Monica also recorded with duo Dre & Vidal as well as Tricky Stewart, Scott Storch, Jazze Pha, No I.D., and rappers Mannie Fresh, Akon and Young Jeezy, though none of the songs produced with them eventually made the final track listing. Some of them, however, such as "Ain't Nothing", "So in Love", and "Why Lie", appeared on her 2007 mixtape Greg Street Present......Monica Made: The Mixtape or were later leaked onto the internet.

Although the project was tentatively titled Street Butterfly, Raw, or A Dozen Roses at one time or another, the album was eventually named after Curtis Mayfield's song "The Makings of You" from his solo debut album Curtis (1970), which is sampled in the Elliott-produced song "A Dozen Roses (You Remind Me)": "With a dozen roses / Such will astound you / The joy of children laughing around you / These are the makings of you." When asked about the meaning of the title, Monica elaborated in a 2006 interview with Billboard that "this album is really the makings of me because it talks about so many different scenarios, both good and bad, that have pretty much brought me to the point where I'm at mentally," she said, comparing it with a "musical diary where people can really see me in a lot of different lights for once."

== Lyrical themes ==
Although Monica received neither a producing nor a songwriting credit on The Makings of Me, the album was widely addressed as her most personal effort yet. The singer attributed the personal sound of the album to the words of her self-written poetries, she has started writing in the late 1990s and of which about half of the songs on the album are based on. Having used the writings before to inspire the themes of the tracks for previous albums All Eyez on Me (2002) and After the Storm (2003), it was actually the first time she handed the poems over to her songwriters. "That was kind of private [to hand over]," Monica said in an interview with Deseret News. "It was going into the hands of about seven or eight people. It was difficult to do something like that the first time around." Feeling obligated to unveil her true thoughts about past relationships, writers Tank, Manuel Seal and others crafted songs such as "Sideline Ho" and "Why Her", which were inspired by the poems or their backstories.

The album contains several references to Atlanta, Georgia and alludes to contemporary fashion labels such as Gucci, and automobile manufacturers Bentley and Mercedes-Benz. On "A Dozen Roses (You Remind Me)", singers R. Kelly and Gladys Knight are mentioned. Although Monica intended for the album to include some light recordings, she stated that The Makings of Me "is not an album for kids". "This album is very, very different from the other ones, because of me personally. Now, at 26, the way I look at things, even relationships, I was really able to involve more of my life experiences in the album," Monica said to MTV News, adding: "I had to tell my story [...] There are too many people who have been in the same situation as me and really don't know their way out. Hopefully through my words, what I say can open a door."

== Music ==
"Everytime tha Beat Drop", one of the last songs recorded for The Makings of Me, was chosen as the lead single to show "something that appears on the outside to be different from" Monica and, in addition, represents her hometown Atlanta. Greatly influenced by snap music, the track incorporates beats of Nelly's 2005 single "Grillz" and a sample of the 2006 single "Lean wit It, Rock wit It", as performed by Dem Franchize Boyz. The song received lukewarm reviews, noted as "a decent but ultimately forgettable [...] obligatory club track", and was a mediocre success, reaching the top twenty on the U.S. Billboard Hot R&B/Hip-Hop Songs chart only. The second single, Elliott-penned "A Dozen Roses (You Remind Me)", underperformed. The song, a modern rework of Curtis Mayfield's 1972 single "The Makings of You", was the last music video-accompanied release from the album.

"Everytime tha Beat Drop"
Monica's top-twenty hit, influenced by snap music with R&B-driven hip hop.

"A Dozen Roses (You Remind Me)"
Monica's second single which contains an "oversung downer".

"Sideline Ho", the third track, was written and produced by fellow R&B musician Tank. Based upon a self-written poem by Monica, the lyrics of the song were inspired by an ex who cheated on her with a video model. It was released as the album's third single, and although the song saw a comparatively successful debut on the charts, J Records refused to agree on producing a music video for the song, with ideas for a video treatment being eventually scrapped. The fourth track, Jermaine Dupri-produced "Why Her", serves as a direct follow-up to "Sideline Ho" and was also inspired by a poem. "After all the anger and the smoke cleared, the next one that I wrote was Why Her. And I thought it was really clever [...] to create songs off of my poems like that," Monica said. The song received a generally positive reception from music critics, and was compared to Mariah Carey's 2005 recording "We Belong Together". "Hell No (Leave Home)", the fifth track, has Monica trading verses with fast-paced rapper Twista. The singer commented the recording of the rhymes as comical: "He [Twista] had so much patience with me and allowed me to learn his way of rapping. Of course, rapping isn't what I do, but I did enjoy the experience. The way I learned best was with him in the booth." Released as the final single from the album, it was released to no commercial success.

"Doin' Me Right", built around a sample of The Whispers' 1976 "Chocolate Girl", was noted as one of the "few songs about good men" on The Makings of Me, alongside Underdogs-crafted "My Everything". Considered as this album's "Knock Knock" (the second single from 2003's After the Storm), it was praised by critics who called the track "another sweet twist on a soft-soul classic." The seventh track, "Raw", features production and guest vocals by Swizz Beatz and was noted the only upbeat track on the album next to "Everytime tha Beat Drop". It chronicles the protagonist's lament on so-called "playas" over a speaker-jarring 808 beat, and received mixed reviews. "Gotta Move On", the ninth track, incorporates minor elements of oriental music. Featuring backing vocals by singer Tweet, it was declared "a kiss-off dipped in honey" by Allmusic. The closing track, "Getaway", is an all-piano song, except for a few accents from a snare drum briefly throughout the tune. It discusses the witnessing of Monica's former boyfriend Jarvis Weems' death in 2000.

== Singles and promotion ==
Altogether The Makings of Me spawned four singles: The lead album's first single, Dupri-produced "Everytime tha Beat Drop" barely made it to top fifty on the US Billboard Hot 100 chart with a peak position of number forty-eight only, becoming Monica's least successful lead single since 2002's "All Eyez on Me". It, however, reached number eleven on the Hot R&B/Hip-Hop Songs chart, and number seven on the World R&B Top 30 Singles chart. The second and third singles from the album, "A Dozen Roses (You Remind Me)" and "Sideline Ho", underquoted this success with peak positions of number forty-eight and forty-five respectively on the Hot R&B/Hip-Hop Songs, never making it to the official Billboard Hot 100. A fourth single, "Hell No (Leave Home)" was serviced to U.S. radios on May 14, 2007, achieving similar success. In support of the singles releases, Monica appeared on BET's 106 & Park and Blueprint, and performed on The Ellen DeGeneres Show.

== Critical reception ==
Professional ratings
Review scores
Source	Rating
About.com	3.5/5 stars
AllMusic	4/5 stars
Entertainment Weekly	B
New York Post	3/4 stars
People	3/4 stars
Prefix	7/10
USA Today	3/4 stars

The Makings of Me received generally positive reviews from most music critics. Andy Kellman of AllMusic gave the album four stars out of five and called it a "concise and mostly sweet (if occasionally unremarkable) set of songs", especially praising Elliott's input on the album. Ryan Dombal of Entertainment Weekly declared it "a solid addition" to Monica's discography, and although he saw her faltering on ballads such as "My Everything", he added: "the singer hints at mature contentment on her fourth CD — while retaining some angry edge, [...] scoring tough-talking venom." USA Today writer Steve Jones, on the other hand, wrote: "Sweet ballads like "My Everything" and the Curtis Mayfield-laced "A Dozen Roses (You Remind Me)" find her nicely contented having found the one. But do her wrong or play her soft and she'll unleash a torrent of scorn [...] In the mid-90s, she was the sassy 14-year-old Miss Thang. Now she's full grown and not to be fooled with. Still, she can get the dancefloor popping."

People magazine gave the album three stars out of four. It found that "her fourth disc, demonstrates why the singer has been able to outlast many an R&B ingenue." In a mixed review, Clover Hope of Billboard magazine wrote that "while The Makings of Me has its needless trendchasing moments, her rich voice and prime subject are the main draw". He criticized the album for its "avoidable" lead single "Everytime tha Beat Drop", writing that "Monica is good enough without the fluff." In his review for About.com, Mark Edward Nero noted The Makings of Me "a very personal album that listening to it is almost like reading a diary", and while he applauded the songwriting and song production as "excellent", he cited a "lack of emotion" in Monica's voice: "She cuts loose, but for the most part, Monica seems more concerned with pitch-perfect singing than singing with genuine emotion. In addition, he also criticised the shortness of the album. USA Today gave the album three stars out of four and called Monica "full grown and not to be fooled with," while Ebony hailed the album as "full of variety, depth, and maturity." New York Post's Dan Aquilante wrote: "After a three-year hiatus, she revives her career with a well-balanced disc of hard raps, dance beats and smooth groove coos."

== Commercial performance ==
During the week of October 21, 2006, The Makings of Me debuted and peaked at number eight on the Billboard 200 chart, with first week sales of 93,000 copies. On the Top R&B/Hip-Hop Albums chart, the album, debuted at number-one, becoming Monica's first album to reach the top spot on the R&B/Hip-Hop Albums chart. By December 2008, the album had sold 314,000 copies, and as of 2010 it has sold over 328,000 copies domestically. This album marks the first album by Monica to not receive a certification by the Recording Industry Association of America (RIAA) to date. Outside of the United States, the album debuted at number seventy-five on the Japanese Albums Chart.

With The Makings of Me comprising an outweighing slower set of mid-tempo recording and ballads, J Records's decision to release up-tempo record "Everytime tha Beat Drop", an eleventh-hour addition to the album that had originally been recorded for a different project, to lead it, was met with mixed reaction from Monica's team. While she considered the song a not unwelcome breakaway from her sound, Monica later blamed the selection on the album's overall performance since she felt that "Everytime tha Beat Drop" did not speak to her core audience and was a poor representation of the album as a whole. After The Makings of Me's commercial underperformance, she felt obliged to follow a more authentic approach on her next project Still Standing which abandoned "all the different gimmicks and trends" in favor of a record that lived up to the sound her previous hits, particularly those from the 1990s.

== Track listing ==
The Making of Me – Standard edition
No.	Title	Writer(s)	Producer(s)	Length
1.	"Everytime tha Beat Drop" (featuring Dem Franchize Boyz)	Jamal Willingham; Jermaine Dupri; James Phillips; Johnta Austin; Gerald Tiller; Bernard Leverette; Maurice Gleaton; Charles Hammond; Robert Hill; D'Angelo Hunt	Dupri; LRoc^{[A]}	3:43
2.	"A Dozen Roses (You Remind Me)"	Curtis Mayfield; Missy Elliott; Corte Ellis	Elliott; Cliff Jones^{[A]}; David Lindsey^{[A]}	3:51
3.	"Sideline Ho"	Harvey Mason, Jr.; Damon Thomas; Antonio Dixon; Eric Dawkins; Steve Russell; Tank	The Underdogs; Tank	3:45
4.	"Why Her"	Dupri; Manuel Seal; Harold Lilly	Dupri; Seal^{[A]}	4:08
5.	"Hell No (Leave Home)" (featuring Twista)	Carl Mitchell; Bryan-Michael Cox; Sean Garrett	Cox; Garrett	4:44
6.	"Doin' Me Right"	Cainon Lamb; Miguel Castro; Craig Brockman; Elliott; Wayne Bell; Ellis	Elliott; Lamb^{[A]}; Castro^{[A]}	3:19
7.	"Raw" (featuring Swizz Beatz)	Kasseem Dean; Lilly	Swizz Beatz; Lilly^{[A]}	3:43
8.	"My Everything"	Tank; Thomas; Dixon; Dawkins; Russell; Mason, Jr.	The Underdogs; Russell^{[A]}	3:40
9.	"Gotta Move On"	Elliott; Brockman	Elliott; Brockman^{[A]}	3:44
10.	"Getaway"	Paul Morton, Jr.	Dupri	3:36

The Making of Me – US Best Buy edition (bonus track)
No.	Title	Writer(s)	Producer(s)	Length
11.	"Thanks for the Misery"	Garret; Anthony Dent	Dent	3:42

The Making of Me – Japanese edition (bonus video)
No.	Title	Length
12.	"Everytime tha Beat Drop" (featuring Dem Franchize Boyz; music video)

Notes

- ^{^[A]} denotes co-producer

Sample credits

- "Everytime tha Beat Drop" contains a samples of Dem Franchize Boyz' 2006 "Lean wit It, Rock wit It".
- "A Dozen Roses (You Remind Me)" contains a samples of Curtis Mayfield's 1972 "The Makings of Me".
- "Doin' Me Right" contains a samples of The Whispers' 1976 "Chocolate Girl".

== Personnel ==
Credits are taken from The Makings of Me liner notes.

Managerial

- Monica Arnold – album producer, executive producer
- Clive Davis – album producer
- Melinda Dancil – associate executive producer
- Jermaine Dupri – executive producer
- Lary Jackson – album producer

Performance credits

- Monica Arnold – lead vocals (tracks 1–2, 5–7, 9), background vocals (2, 5–6), All vocals (3–4, 8, 10)
- Swizz Beatz – vocal assistance (track 7)
- Dem Franchize Boyz – vocal assistance, sampled background vocals (track 1)
- Missy Elliott – background and additional lead vocals (tracks 2, 6, 9)
- Tweet – background vocals (track 9)
- Twista – vocal assistance (track 5)

Visuals and imagery

- Jane Morledge – design
- Chris Lebeau – art direction
- Markus Klinko and Indrani – photography
- GK Reid – styling

Technical and production

- Angel Aponte – recording engineer (track 7)
- Corte Ellis – recording engineer (tracks 6, 9)
- Paul J. Falcone – recording engineer (tracks 2, 6, 9), audio mixing (6)
- John Horesco IV – recording engineer (tracks 1, 4, 10)
- David Kutch – mastering
- Samuel "Vaughan" Merrick – vocal recording engineer (track 5)
- Tadd "Rowdy Rik" Mingo – recording engineer (tracks 1, 4, 10)
- Vernon Mungo – recording engineer (track 7)
- Sam Thomas – additional instrumental recording engineer, additional music editing (track 5)

Musicians

- Adelaide Federici – violin (track 10)
- Karen Freer – cello (track 10)
- P. David Hancock – cello (track 10)
- Helen Kim – violin (track 10)
- Tom Knight – live drums (track 10)
- Alice Lord – viola (track 10)
- PJ Morton – live piano, keyboards (track 10)
- Tania Maxwell Clements – viola (track 10)
- Jackie Pickett – double bass (track 10)

== Charts ==
=== Weekly charts ===
Weekly chart performance for The Makings of Me
Chart (2006)	Peak position
Japanese Albums (Oricon)	75
US Billboard 200	8
US Digital Albums (Billboard)	23
US Top R&B/Hip-Hop Albums (Billboard)	1

=== Year-end charts ===
2006 year-end chart performance for The Makings of Me
Chart (2006)	Position
US Top R&B/Hip-Hop Albums (Billboard)	78

2007 year-end chart performance for The Makings of Me
Chart (2007)	Position
US Top R&B/Hip-Hop Albums (Billboard)	85

== Release history ==
Release dates and formats for The Makings of Me
Region	Date	Format(s)	Label	Edition(s)	Ref
United States	October 3, 2006	CD; digital download	J Records	Standard	
Canada	October 10, 2006	CD; digital download	J Records	Standard	
United Kingdom	December 9, 2006	CD; digital download	J Records	Standard	
