= Gotta Getcha =

Single by Jermaine Dupri featuring Johntá Austin

from the album Young, Fly & Flashy, Vol. 1
- Released: June 14, 2005
- Recorded: 2005
- Genre: Hip-hop
- Length: 4:23
- Label: So So Def; Virgin
- Songwriters: Jermaine Mauldin; James Phillips; Melissa Elliott
- Producers: Jermaine Dupri; LRoc

Jermaine Dupri singles chronology
"It's Like That" (2005)	"Gotta Getcha" (2005)	"I Think They Like Me (Remix)" (2005)

Johntá Austin singles chronology
"Gotta Getcha" (2005)	"Shortie Like Mine" (2006)

"Gotta Getcha" is a song by the American rapper Jermaine Dupri, released as the first single from his compilation album Young, Fly & Flashy, Vol. 1 (2005). The album version features vocals by Johntá Austin, and uncredited vocals from Janet Jackson and Missy Elliott, the latter of whom helped write the song alongside Dupri and LRoc. The original version featured Elliott rapping and singing the chorus. The remix features Usher, Austin and Rico Love. Another remix featuring Usher, Austin and Missy Elliott was released via mixtapes.

== Music video ==
Janet Jackson makes a cameo in the song's music video as an exotic dancer portraying a school teacher.

== Charts ==
Chart (2005)	Peak position
Australian Urban (ARIA)	25
US Billboard Hot 100	60
US Hot R&B/Hip-Hop Songs (Billboard)	31
US Pop 100 (Billboard)	72
US Hot Rap Songs (Billboard)	15
