= Pimped Out =

Single by Brooke Valentine featuring Dem Franchize Boyz

from the album Physical Education Mixtape Album
- Released: November 21, 2006 (Airplay)
- Genre: R&B; snap; southern hip hop
- Length: 4:44
- Label: Virgin
- Songwriters: James "Chip" Bunton; Erica Dymakkus; Kanesha Brookes; Bernard "Jizzal Man" Leverette; Jamal "Pimpin" Willingham
- Producer: C. Carroll Cole

Brooke Valentine singles chronology
"D-Girl (DopeGirl)" (2006)	"Pimped Out" (2006)	"Forever" (2012)

Dem Franchize Boyz singles chronology
"Everytime tha Beat Drop" (2006)	"Pimped Out" (2006)	"Talkin' Out da Side of Ya Neck!" (2008)

"Pimped Out" is a song recorded by American R&B singer Brooke Valentine. It was released as the second single from her sophomore album, Physical Education. The song features the southern hip hop group Dem Franchize Boyz. The single was released in 2006 and peaked at #87 on the Billboard Hot R&B/Hip-Hop Songs chart.

In 2007, it had been announced that the album had been shelved. A mixtape titled Physical Education: The Mixtape was released in April 2009, and it featured the track.

The song was mixed by Kevin "KD" Davis.

== Track listing ==
12" vinyl Side A

1. "Pimped Out" (Radio Edit) - 4:17
2. "Pimped Out" (Radio Edit (No Rap) - 3:28
3. "Pimped Out" (Album version - Edited) - 4:40

Side B

1. "Pimped Out" (Album version - Explicit) - 4:40
2. "Pimped Out" (Instrumental) - 4:39
3. "Pimped Out" (A Cappella - Explicit With Rap) - 4:36

CD single

1. "Pimped Out"
2. "Pimped Out" (Radio edit)
3. "Pimped Out" (Edited Album version)
4. "Pimped Out" (Instrumental)

== Charts ==
Chart (2006)	Peak position
U.S. Billboard Hot R&B/Hip-Hop Songs	87

== Personnel ==
Credits for Pimped Out adapted from Allmusic.

- Composers: James "Chip" Bunton, Erica Dymakkus, Bernard "Jizzal Man" Leverette, Brooke Valentine, Jamall "Pimpin" Willingham - Composer
- Producer: C. Carroll Cole
- Mixer: Kevin KD Davis
- Primary Artist: Brooke Valentine, Dem Franchize Boyz
