= So So Gangsta =

Studio album by Daz Dillinger
- Released: September 12, 2006
- Recorded: 2006
- Studios: Studio Atlantis (Los Angeles, CA); The Hit Factory Criteria (Miami, FL); Poe Boy Studios (Miami, FL); Crippin Kitchen (Hollywood, CA); SouthSide Studios (Atlanta, GA)
- Genre: West Coast hip hop
- Length: 48:55
- Labels: So So Def; Virgin
- Producers: Jermaine Dupri (also exec.); Daz Dillinger; No I.D.; Scott Storch

Daz Dillinger chronology
Gangsta Crunk (2005)	So So Gangsta (2006)	Gangsta Party (2007)

Singles from So So Gangsta
- 1. "On Some Real Shit" Released: July 18, 2006; 2. "Weekend" Released: November 13, 2006; 3. "All I Need" Released: 2006; 4. "Daz Thang" Released: 2006

So So Gangsta is the eighth solo studio album by American rapper Daz Dillinger. It was released on September 12, 2006, via So So Def and Virgin Records simultaneously with an instrumental album entitled So So Gangsta - The Album Sampler. Recording sessions took place at Studio Atlantis and at the Crippin Kitchen in Los Angeles, at the Hit Factory Criteria and at Poe Boy Studios in Miami, and at SouthSide Studios in Atlanta. Production was handled by Jermaine Dupri, No I.D., Scott Storch and Daz himself, with LRoc, Ivan Johnson and Soopafly serving as co-producers. It features guest appearances from Avery Storm, Ice Cube, Jagged Edge, Johntá Austin, Kurupt, Rick Ross, Snoop Dogg, Soopafly and The Kid Slim. The album debuted at number 35 on the Billboard 200 with just over 23,000 albums sold its first week. It has reached 150,000 moved units according to SoundScan on October 10, 2007.

The album spawned two singles: "On Some Real Shit" and "Weekend". The accompanying music video for "On Some Real Shit" was directed by Juwan Lee, while the single made it to number 90 on the Hot R&B/Hip-Hop Songs. The video for "All I Need" was directed by D. Baker, and the one for "Thang on My Hip" was directed by Daz and Todd 1.

== Critical reception ==
Professional ratings
Review scores
Source	Rating
AllMusic	3.5/5 stars
HipHopDX	3.5/5
Prefix	6.5/10
RapReviews	8/10
USA Today	2.5/4 stars
XXL	3/5 (L)

AllMusic's David Jeffries wrote: "While some redundancy towards the end and a couple of unnecessary guest stars keep this from being vital, it's generally a well-built effort, and just like Cube's 2006 release, So So Gangsta offers a veteran Left Coaster sounding as hungry as he did in the WC's heyday." William Ketchum III of HipHopDX praised Daz for maintaining his "California strut" by delivering "hardcore rhymes" over "equally tough soundscapes" with his West Coast friends, and was surprised by his "natural chemistry" with Dupri when swapping his "gangsterisms for light-hearted rhymes" alongside Rick Ross and Jagged Edge, concluding that: "So So Gangsta swiftly delivers the best of both worlds: satisfying doses of both JD's trademark So So Def production and Daz's signature gangsta flow." Steve 'Flash' Juon of RapReviews wrote: "If you're looking for some certified fly West coast shit it's hard to go wrong with "So So Gangsta," easily one of Daz's best solo albums of the past 10 years." Paul Cantor of XXL wrote: "Lyrically, Daz is still dat nigga, but he rarely expounds upon anything other than clichéd themes here. Although Gangsta's a welcome return for the OG, a little less gun talk and more substance would have broken up the monotony and saved the CD from just being so so."

== Track listing ==
No.	Title	Writer(s)	Producer(s)	Length
1.	"Thang on My Hip"	Delmar Arnaud; Jermaine Dupri; Raeford Gerald	No I.D.	3:28
2.	"On Some Real" (featuring Rick Ross)	Arnaud; William Roberts; Dupri; James Phillips	Jermaine Dupri; LRoc (co.)	3:57
3.	"Rat a Tat Tat"	Arnaud; Priest Brooks	Daz Dillinger; Soopafly (co.)	4:27
4.	"Weekend" (featuring Johntá Austin)	Arnaud; Dupri; Phillips	Jermaine Dupri; LRoc (co.)	2:58
5.	"DPG fo' Life" (featuring Snoop Dogg and Soopafly)	Arnaud; Calvin Broadus; Brooks	Daz Dillinger; Soopafly (co.)	4:57
6.	"Badder Than a Mutha" (featuring Avery Storm)	Arnaud; Dupri; Phillips	Jermaine Dupri; LRoc (co.)	2:52
7.	"Daz Thing" (featuring Kurupt)	Arnaud; Dupri; Phillips	Jermaine Dupri; LRoc (co.)	4:11
8.	"Money on My Mind" (featuring Kurupt)	Arnaud; David Brown; Scott Storch	Scott Storch	4:16
9.	"Strizap" (featuring Ice Cube)	Arnaud; O'Shea Jackson; Ivan Johnson; Michael Jordan	Daz Dillinger; Ivan Johnson (co.)	4:27
10.	"Dangerous" (featuring The Kid Slim)	Arnaud; Jaron Alston; Walter Guathier	Daz Dillinger; Ivan Johnson (co.)	4:44
11.	"All I Need"	Arnaud; Alston; Dupri	Jermaine Dupri	3:12
12.	"The One" (featuring Jagged Edge)	Arnaud; Brian Casey; Brandon Casey; Dupri; Phillips	Jermaine Dupri; LRoc (co.)	5:46
13.	"Dat's Dat Nigga"	Arnaud; Johnson	Daz Dillinger; Ivan Johnson (co.)	3:54
Total length:				53:06

Sample credits

- Track 1 contains samples from the composition "Friends or Lovers" written by Raeford Gerald and performed by Act One

== Personnel ==
- Delmar "Daz Dillinger" Arnaud – main artist, producer (tracks: 3, 5, 8, 9, 12), recording (tracks: 3, 5, 9, 12)
- William "Rick Ross" Roberts II – featured artist (track 2)
- Johntá Austin – featured artist (track 4)
- Calvin "Snoop Dogg" Broadus – featured artist (track 5)
- Priest "Soopafly" Brooks – featured artist (track 5), co-producer (tracks: 3, 5)
- Ralph "Avery Storm" Di Stasio – featured artist (track 6)
- Ricardo "Kurupt" Brown – featured artist (track 7)
- O'Shea "Ice Cube" Jackson – featured artist (track 8)
- Jaron "The Kid Slim" Alston – featured artist (track 9)
- Jagged Edge – featured artists (track 11)
- Ernest "No I.D." Wilson – producer (track 1)
- Jermaine Dupri – producer (tracks: 2, 4, 6, 10, 11), mixing (tracks: 1–6, 8, 10–12), executive producer
- Scott Storch – producer (track 7)
- James "LRoc" Phillips – co-producer (tracks: 2, 4, 6, 11)
- Ivan Johnson – co-producer (tracks: 8, 9, 12)
- John Horesco IV – recording (tracks: 1, 2, 4, 6, 10, 11)
- Tadd "Rowdy Rik" Mingo – recording (tracks: 2, 3, 5, 6, 8–10, 12)
- Elvin "Big Chuck" Prince – recording (track 2)
- Conrad Golding – recording (track 7)
- Wayne Allison – recording (track 7)
- Phil Tan – mixing (tracks: 1–6, 8, 10–12)
- Doug Wilson – mixing (track 7)
- Rufus Morgan – assistant recording (track 8)
- Josh Houghkirk – assistant mixing (tracks: 3, 5, 8, 12)
- Reed Taylor – assistant mixing (track 7)
- Vlado Meller – mastering
- Will Ragland – art direction, design
- Kate McGregor – art coordinator
- Kai Regan – photography
- Sterling J. Carroll III – A&R
- Ronette Bowie – A&R
- Eddie "Skeeter Rock" Weathers – A&R
- Bret D. Lewis – legal

== Charts ==
Chart (2006)	Peak position
US Billboard 200	35
US Top R&B/Hip-Hop Albums (Billboard)	6
US Top Rap Albums (Billboard)	2
