= 3000 and 9 Shit =

Mixtape by Ocean's 7
- Released: May 9, 2009
- Recorded: 2009
- Studio: Atlanta
- Genres: Hip hop; R&B
- Length: 37:10
- Producers: Jermaine Dupri; Bryan Michael-Cox; Johnta Austin

3000 and 9 Shit is a collaborative mixtape by American recording artists Ocean's 7. Including Jermaine Dupri, Usher, Trey Songz, Nelly, Bryan Michael-Cox, Tyrone and Johnta Austin. The mixtape was released on May 9, 2009.

== Background ==
Jermaine Dupri's composed an interview on his Global 14 website, Ocean's 7. The recording process went by whoever was in the studio each night instead of setting up a recording schedule. In an interview Durpi said "We made one song, one song turned into the next song. Whoever showed up in the studio was who got on the songs. A lot of people [are] saying 'why isn't this person on this song,' or 'why isn't that person on that song,' you know? Usher's not on the mixtape because he started going through his divorce at that point in time so we let him do what he had to do."

== Track listing ==
No.	Title	Length
1.	"Intro"	3:26
2.	"Ain't I"	4:36
3.	"Diddy Skit"	0:18
4.	"So Much Swag" (featuring Bow Wow)	4:35
5.	"Where's The Love"	3:24
6.	"Owe Me Sex"	4:31
7.	"It's Amazin"	3:26
8.	"Day N Nite"	0:23
9.	"Outro" (Day N Nite)	3:39
10.	"Vegas is our Town"	3:39
11.	"Vegas Baby"	3:44
Total length:		37:10
