= White Tee =

2004 single by Dem Franchize Boyz

Single by Dem Franchize Boyz

from the album Dem Franchize Boyz
- Released: August 10, 2004 (US)
- Recorded: 2003
- Genre: Crunk; gangsta rap; hardcore hip hop; snap
- Length: 4:38
- Label: So So Def; Universal
- Songwriters: M. Gleaton; G. Tiller; J. Willingham; B Leverette

Dem Franchize Boyz singles chronology
"White Tee" (2004)	"I Think They Like Me" (2005)

"White Tee" is a 2004 song by Dem Franchize Boyz, which appeared on their debut album Dem Franchize Boyz, released on So So Def Records and Universal Records.

Playboi Carti sampled the song on his single "Wokeuplikethis". In 2020, Travis Scott released the song "Franchise", which interpolates and pays homage to "White Tee" in its chorus.

== Controversy ==
An article in the Pittsburgh Post-Gazette, which mentions the song, and the fashion statement, stated that after the release of the song, many clubs and schools began to ban the use of white T-shirts on the basis that the shirts were associated with gangs.

== Music video ==
The video for the song begins with a faux news report by "Robert Watson" from Atlanta, who is holding a microphone with "DFB" on it. He is talking about waiting from a call from the governor, when his phone rings. He then tells the camera that he "just saved a bunch of money on wardrobe by switching to White Tee's", in reference to Geico commercials. The video then progresses into the song, where everyone is shown wearing white T-shirts as they perform numerous activities such as riding "quads", dancing on cars, skateboarding and riding bikes.

== Remix ==
The official remix features So So Def labelmates Jermaine Dupri and The Kid Slim. The remix is the last track (hidden track) off the group's next album, On Top of Our Game.

== Charts ==
Chart (2004)	Peak position
U.S. Billboard Hot 100	79
U.S. Billboard Hot R&B/Hip-Hop Songs	25
U.S. Billboard Hot Rap Tracks	23

== Release history ==
Region	Date	Format(s)	Label(s)	Ref.
United States	July 26, 2004	Rhythmic contemporary · Urban contemporary radio	Universal	
