= Weekend (Daz song) =

Single by Daz Dillinger featuring Johnta Austin

from the album So So Gangsta
- Released: 2006
- Genre: R&B
- Length: 2:58
- Label: So So Def; Virgin
- Songwriters: Delmar Arnaud; Jermaine Dupri; James Phillips
- Producer: Jermaine Dupri

Daz singles chronology
"On Some Real Shit" (2006)	"Weekend" (2006)	"Dip, Drop, Stop, Dip" (2008)

Weekend is the second single from Daz Dillinger's eighth studio album So So Gangsta. The song premiered on the DJ playlists on November 13, 2006, according to Radio & Records Rhythmic and Urban charts .

== Song information ==
The song features fellow labelmate Johnta Austin, and was produced by Jermaine Dupri. It samples Los Angeles Negros' version of Murio La Flor.

== Chart Awards ==
Chart	Position
Billboard Radio & Records - Urban	# 1
