= Talkin' Out da Side of Ya Neck! =

Single by Dem Franchize Boyz

from the album Our World, Our Way
- Released: January 22, 2008
- Recorded: 2007
- Genre: Southern hip hop; snap
- Length: 3:57
- Label: Virgin; Capitol; EMI
- Songwriter(s): Shondrae Crawford, Maurice Gleaton, Bernard Leverette, Gerald Tiller, Jamal Willingham
- Producer(s): Bangladesh

Dem Franchize Boyz singles chronology
"Pimped Out" (2006)	"Talkin' Out da Side of Ya Neck!" (2008)	"Turn Heads" (2008)

"Talkin' Out da Side of Ya Neck!" is the first single from Dem Franchize Boyz's third studio album Our World, Our Way. It is produced by Bangladesh.

== Charts ==
Chart (2007)	Peak Position
U.S. Billboard Hot R&B/Hip-Hop Songs	71
