= Franchise (song) =

Single by Travis Scott featuring Young Thug and M.I.A.
- Released: September 25, 2020
- Recorded: 2020 in Houston, Texas
- Genre: Trap
- Length: 3:22
- Label: Epic; Cactus Jack
- Songwriters: Jacques Webster II; Jeffery Williams; Mathangi Arulpragasam; Travis "Teddy" Walton; Chase Benjamin; Aaron Booe; Jamal Willingham; Bernard Leverette; Maurice Gleaton; Gerald Tiller
- Producers: Scott; Walton

Travis Scott singles chronology
"The Plan" (2020)	"Franchise" (2020)	"Goosebumps (Remix)" (2021)

Young Thug singles chronology
"Mismatch (The Remix)" (2020)	"Franchise" (2020)	"Say You Love Me" (2020)

M.I.A. singles chronology
"CTRL" (2020)	"Franchise" (2020)	"The One" (2022)

Music video
- "Franchise" on YouTube

"Franchise" (stylized in all caps) is a song by American rapper Travis Scott featuring fellow American rapper Young Thug and British rapper M.I.A. Originally titled "White Tee", the song interpolates Dem Franchize Boyz's song of the same name. The bass-heavy track finds the rappers boasting about their commercial successes. The song was released on September 25, 2020, alongside a video shot partly in England and at Michael Jordan's Chicago mansion. The video won the 2021 MTV Video Music Award for Best Hip Hop Video.

The song debuted atop the U.S. Billboard Hot 100, for the chart dated October 10, 2020, becoming Scott's fourth number-one (third number-one debut), Young Thug's second, and M.I.A.'s first. By doing so, Scott became the first artist in Billboard chart history to have three songs debut at number one in less than a year, and M.I.A. became the first British hip hop act to top the Billboard Hot 100. It also debuted at number seven on the Billboard Global 200 chart.

== Background ==
The song was first previewed by Scott and his DJ Chase B on July 20, 2020, during the tenth episode of .WAV Radio. That version featured only Young Thug and was known under the title "White Tee". On September 16, it was made available for pre-order on Scott's website.

Speaking to Apple Music, Scott said he recruited M.I.A. for the song after she reached out to him to appear on her next album, explaining, "When I finished the song, I couldn't think of nobody else that I could probably just maybe like, body this shit. You know what I'm saying? Body this shit like as hard as like anyone else, any other rapper, any other artists. And just that presence, man. We ain't felt this presence in a long time. [...] Like all of this, the energy man, music, beats, raps, God! Everything, she's the illest of all time". An in-studio look of the song's creation was released by Scott following the song's release.

== Composition ==
The song interpolates and pays homage to American rap group Dem Franchize Boyz's 2004 single "White Tee" in its chorus. Lyrically, the rappers boasts about their successes, over a "booming" bass. Scott makes references to Spike Lee, Zootopia, and director Jeff Pollack, while Young Thug "recaptures the energy" of his song, "The London", rapping about flying private jets to France and about Pop Smoke, among other things. Soundigest's Sam Gibbs noted that the lyrics "also seem to play off of [Scott's] partnership with McDonald's, which is actually a franchise".

== Critical reception ==
Hypebeast's Sophie Caraan said the song "utilizes an interesting fusion of contrasting yet complementing flows from Scott, M.I.A. and Thugger". Deeming the song "hazy", Complex's Jessica McKinney listed it among the best music of the week, noting Young Thug's and M.I.A.'s "pulsating" and "high energy" verses, respectively. Spin's Brenton Blanchet called it a "gnarly musical concoction" and said "the dynamic team-up, while unexpected, proves Scott is a real franchise player and knows a thing or two about assembling the right musical team". Billboard's Jason Lipshutz named it an essential release, praising M.I.A. for being "the real surprise here, trading boasts with Scott midway through the song in a way that smacks of a 'Swagga Like Us' for a new generation of hip-hop". NME's Caleb Triscari called it "a quintessential Scott track, with earth-shattering bass". Matt Melis of Consequence of Sound opined: "Scott's as prolific a songwriter as he is a savvy businessman, and he flaunts that business acumen on 'Franchise' in much the same way emcees used to brag about ice and their tricked-out whips". In a negative review, Sam Gibbs of Soundigest said "the song is not anything special", however complementing M.I.A., Gibbs deemed her "a real treat in this otherwise lackluster single", for her "character and spirit bring a special sort of flair".

== Music video ==
The music video premiered at select IMAX theatres prior to the film Tenet (for which Scott recorded the song "The Plan"). It was released on YouTube at midnight the same day. The video was directed by Scott and White Trash Tyler and was filmed in the UK and at Michael Jordan's mansion in Highland Park, Illinois. Jordan granted permission to film the video "without hesitation" after receiving a call from Scott.

The visual opens with vintage footage of Jordan leaving the mansion in a bright-red second generation Range Rover, a scene taken from the Netflix basketball documentary series The Last Dance. It then cuts to luxury cars arriving at Jordan's house. Inside the mansion, Scott is seen with women, playing on the basketball court and partying on the lawn. He and Young Thug play a round of golf and poker, while M.I.A. dances in a field surrounded with mirrors and a herd of sheep. M.I.A.'s scenes were shot in Rye, England, and she wears a suit made of nearly 600 fresh flowers, which were built onto her body. The camera pans in on Young Thug's face as he raps his verse, before zooming out, revealing, as noted by CNET's Daniel Golson, a heavily modified, floating X80 Toyota Cressida. The scene features cameos from YSL signees Gunna and Lil Duke. The video showcases big backdrops, with Scott delivering product-related lines that is reflected in the video. The artists and producer Chase B are seen in white T-shirts, a reference to the song's refrain.

=== Reception ===
NME's Caleb Triscari deemed it "a fever dream of a visual". It was noted for having elements reminiscent of Kendrick Lamar's "Humble" video and the 2019 film Midsommar, and for incorporating references to the work of Chilean–French filmmaker Alejandro Jodorowsky. Complex's Eric Skelton named it "a video of the year contender".

== Commercial performance ==
"Franchise" debuted at number one on the U.S. Billboard Hot 100 with 19.4 million streams and 98,000 sold, of which 58,000 were cassette and CD, and 40,000 digital downloads. The song was available for purchase via two CD single options, with an instrumental version also available for download. The physical and instrumental versions were available exclusively on Scott's website, with the digital versions discounted to 69 cents and certain physical options discounted to $1 during the opening week. The single dropped to number 25 in its second week, marking the second-steepest drop from number one to another position in the chart's history at the time, behind the record-holder at that time 6ix9ine and Nicki Minaj's "Trollz", which fell 33 positions to number 34.

"Franchise" debuted and peaked at number seven on the Billboard Global 200 chart.

== Performances ==
Scott and Young Thug delivered the debut performance of the song in a pre-recorded video shown at the end of Rihanna's Savage X Fenty Show Part 2 on October 2, 2020; they were shown performing on vehicles, including a forklift. Also on October 2, the rappers reunited with M.I.A. on Jimmy Kimmel Live!, although Scott appeared on his own. He was shown alternating from a white-covered room and in the backseat of a self-driven car.

== Cover artwork ==
The single artwork was designed by American visual artist George Condo, who also created the cover for Kanye West's My Beautiful Dark Twisted Fantasy and its singles.

== Accolades ==
Awards and nominations for "Franchise"
Year	Organization	Award	Result
2021	MTV Video Music Awards	MTV Video Music Award for Best Hip Hop Video	Won

== Remix ==
A remix with an additional feature from American rapper Future and a different outro from Scott was released on October 7, 2020. However, it also received criticism for removing the majority of M.I.A.'s contributions.

== Charts ==
=== Weekly charts ===
Chart (2020)	Peak position
Australia (ARIA)	31
Austria (Ö3 Austria Top 40)	25
Belgium (Ultratip Bubbling Under Flanders)	12
Canada Hot 100 (Billboard)	16
Czech Republic Singles Digital (ČNS IFPI)	32
Germany (GfK)	35
Global 200 (Billboard)	7
Hungary (Stream Top 40)	18
Iceland (Tónlistinn)	20
Ireland (IRMA)	23
Italy (FIMI)	60
Netherlands (Single Top 100)	80
New Zealand (Recorded Music NZ)	37
Norway (VG-lista)	30
Portugal (AFP)	22
Slovakia Singles Digital (ČNS IFPI)	8
Sweden (Sverigetopplistan)	57
Switzerland (Schweizer Hitparade)	14
UK Singles (OCC)	26
US Billboard Hot 100	1
US Hot R&B/Hip-Hop Songs (Billboard)	1
US Pop Airplay (Billboard)	27
US Rhythmic Airplay (Billboard)	4

=== Year-end charts ===
Chart (2020)	Position
US Hot R&B/Hip-Hop Songs (Billboard)	87

== Certifications ==
Region	Certification	Certified units/sales
Brazil (Pro-Música Brasil)	2× Platinum	80,000^{‡}
Canada (Music Canada)	Gold	40,000^{‡}
New Zealand (RMNZ)	Gold	15,000^{‡}
Poland (ZPAV)	Platinum	50,000^{‡}
United Kingdom (BPI)	Silver	200,000^{‡}
United States (RIAA)	2× Platinum	2,000,000^{‡}
^{‡} Sales+streaming figures based on certification alone.

== See also ==
- List of Billboard Hot 100 number ones of 2020
