= Dem Franchize Boyz (album) =

Studio album by Dem Franchize Boyz
- Released: September 14, 2004
- Studios: Rocky Road Studios (Atlanta, GA); Temp Town Studio (Atlanta, GA)
- Genres: Southern hip-hop; snap; crunk
- Length: 54:16
- Label: Universal
- Producers: Hard Knard; Parlae; Pimpin; P-No The Matrikks Productions

Dem Franchize Boyz chronology
Dem Franchize Boyz (2004)	On Top of Our Game (2006)

Singles from Dem Franchise Boyz
- 1. "White Tee" Released: August 10, 2004

Dem Franchize Boyz is the self-titled debut full-length studio album by American Southern hip-hop quartet Dem Franchize Boyz. It was released on September 14, 2004 via Universal Records. Recording sessions took place at Rocky Road Studios and Temp Town Studio in Atlanta. Production was handled by P-No, Hard Knard, and members Pimpin and Parlae. It features guest appearances from Meat and Peanut. In the United States, the album debuted at number 106 on the Billboard 200, number 18 on the Top R&B/Hip-Hop Albums and topped the Heatseekers Albums charts. Its lead single, "White Tee", peaked at number 79 on the Billboard Hot 100, number 25 on the Hot R&B/Hip-Hop Songs and number 23 on the Hot Rap Songs charts in the US. The song "Oh I Think Dey Like Me" off of the album was retitled as "I Think They Like Me" and remixed for Jermaine Dupri's 2005 compilation Young, Fly & Flashy, Vol. 1 and the group's follow-up 2006 studio album On Top of Our Game.

== Critical reception ==
Professional ratings
Review scores
Source	Rating
AllMusic	3/5 stars
RapReviews	3.5/10

A writer for AllMusic gave note of the "sparse, understated, and undeniably absorbing" beats throughout the album and the straightforward lyrical topics the rappers go through, concluding with: "That's the spirit of the group's debut, a self-produced album featuring no celebrity guest-stars that, nevertheless, hangs with the big boys of rap." Steve 'Flash' Juon of RapReviews criticized the album for utilizing "the "White Tee" concept extended ad nauseum", pointing out the group's lyrical deficiency by repeating and stretching out words in their songs, concluding that: "At a time when even the crunkest of rappers are making surprisingly profound songs, these 'Boyz' have proven even stupidity can be taken to a whole new level."

== Track listing ==
No.	Title	Writer(s)	Producer(s)	Length
1.	"Where I'm From"	Jamall Willingham; Maurice Gleaton; Bernard Leverette; Gerald Tiller; Delarmon Harold	P-No	5:13
2.	"Fight"	Willingham; Gleaton; Leverette; Tiller; Harold	P-No	4:46
3.	"White Tee"	Willingham; Gleaton; Leverette; Tiller	Pimpin	4:38
4.	"When Can We Date"	Willingham; Gleaton; Leverette; Tiller; Harold	P-No	4:39
5.	"Dat's da Way Dey Roll"	Willingham; Gleaton; Leverette; Tiller; Harold	P-No	4:27
6.	"Do Ya Dance Girl"	Willingham; Gleaton; Leverette; Tiller; F. Cloud	Hard Knard	4:29
7.	"Bitch Nigga"	Willingham; Gleaton; Leverette; Tiller; Harold	P-No	4:49
8.	"Play No Games"	Willingham; Gleaton; Leverette; Tiller; Harold	P-No	4:17
9.	"Slap Ya Witta Bank"	Willingham; Gleaton; Leverette; Tiller; F. Cloud	Hard Knard	4:47
10.	"Oh I Think Dey Like Me"	Willingham; Gleaton; Leverette; Tiller; D'Angelo Hunt	Pimpin	4:33
11.	"Hit da Dirt" (featuring Meat)	Willingham; Gleaton; Leverette; Tiller; D. Holt	Parlae	3:36
12.	"45's Choppaz & 9's" (featuring Peanut and Meat)	Willingham; Gleaton; Leverette; Tiller; Hunt; Holt	Pimpin	4:02
Total length:				54:16

== Charts ==
Chart (2004)	Peak position
US Billboard 200	106
US Top R&B/Hip-Hop Albums (Billboard)	18
US Heatseekers Albums (Billboard)	1
