= Hell No =

Hell No can refer to:

== Music ==
- "Hell No!", a 2005 single by Australian pop singer Ricki Lee Coulter
- "Hell No (Leave Home)", a 2007 single by American R&B singer Monica
- "Hell No", a bonus track by The Hives on The Black and White Album, 2007
- "Hell No", a song by Ingrid Michaelson from her 2016 album It Doesn't Have to Make Sense
- "Hell No", a song by Toby Keith from his 2006 album White Trash with Money
- "Hell No", a song by Bruce Dickinson from Balls to Picasso, 1994
- "Hell No", a song by Kayan9896, 2022

== Other uses ==
- Hell, Norway
- Team Hell No, a WWE Tag Team formed by Kane and Daniel Bryan
