= Money on My Mind (disambiguation) =

"Money on My Mind" is a 2014 song by Sam Smith.

Money on My Mind may also refer to:

- "Money on My Mind", a 2006 song by Daz Dillinger from the album So So Gangsta
- "Money on My Mind", a 2005 song by Lil Wayne from the album Tha Carter II
- "MoneyOnMyMind", a 2020 song by Upsahl
- "Mind on My Money (Money on My Mind)", a 2013 song by Cashis
