= The Price of Fame =

Studio album by Bow Wow
- Released: December 19, 2006
- Genre: Hip-hop
- Length: 43:38
- Labels: LBW; Sony Urban; Columbia

Bow Wow chronology
Wanted (2005)	The Price of Fame (2006)	Face Off (2007)

Singles from The Price of Fame
- 1. "Shortie Like Mine" Released: April 15, 2006; 2. "Outta My System" Released: December 7, 2006; 3. "I'm a Flirt" Released: March 2, 2007

The Price of Fame is the fifth album by American rapper Bow Wow. It was released on December 19, 2006, by Bow Wow's LBW Entertainment and Sony Urban Music. Guest features include appearances from Lil Wayne, Pimp C, Chris Brown and more. Jermaine Dupri supplied beats and was the executive producer. The song "I'm a Flirt", a collaboration with R. Kelly, was included as a hidden track on the CD release.

The Price of Fame received negative reviews from music critics but was a commercial success. The album debuted at number 6 on the US Billboard 200 chart, selling 262,000 copies in the first week. A month later the album was certified Gold by the Recording Industry Association of America (RIAA) in January 2007.

== Singles ==
The first single from the album was "Shortie Like Mine" featuring Chris Brown and Johntá Austin; released on October 3, 2006; it peaked at number 9 on the US Billboard Hot 100 chart. The second single was "Outta My System" featuring T-Pain; released on February 13, 2007, it peaked at number 22 on the chart. The third single "I Don't Know About That".

== Critical reception ==
Professional ratings
Review scores
Source	Rating
AllMusic	2.5/5 stars
RapReviews	4/10
USA Today	2.5/4 stars

AllMusic's David Jeffries critiqued that Bow Wow's attempts to mature as a rapper were diminished by "pulled punches and editing of the cuss words" throughout the album, along with Dupri's middling beats and an insubstantial guest list, concluding that "if you don't have a poster of Bow Wow in your locker, check the singles and skip the album." Matt Tomer of RapReviews commended Dupri's "club-worthy" production but criticized Bow Wow's slow delivery and "pitiful lyrics" that recycle "a limited number of rehashed and reoccurring themes."

== Commercial performance ==
The Price of Fame debuted at number 6 on the US Billboard 200 chart, selling 262,000 copies in its first week. It became Bow Wow's fourth US top-ten album. On January 23, 2007, the album was certified Gold by the Recording Industry Association of America (RIAA) for sales of over 500,000 copies in the United States.

== Track listing ==
No.	Title	Length
1.	"Intro"	0:21
2.	"Price of Fame"	2:38
3.	"4 Corners" (featuring Lil Scrappy, Pimp C, Short Dawg and Lil Wayne)	5:28
4.	"Outta My System" (featuring T-Pain and Johntá Austin)	3:58
5.	"How You Move It"	3:53
6.	"Shortie Like Mine" (featuring Chris Brown and Johntá Austin)	4:28
7.	"Don't Know About That" (featuring Coke J and Young Capone)	3:50
8.	"Tell Me"	3:34
9.	"Damn Thing" (featuring Da Brat)	2:43
10.	"Bet That" (featuring Khleo Thomas)	3:45
11.	"On Fiya"	3:52
12.	"Give It to You"	3:10

Bonus track
No.	Title	Length
13.	"I'm a Flirt" (featuring R. Kelly)	4:36

== Charts ==
=== Weekly charts ===
Chart (2006–2007)	Peak position
US Billboard 200	6
US Top R&B/Hip-Hop Albums (Billboard)	2
US Top Rap Albums (Billboard)	2

=== Year-end charts ===
Chart (2007)	Position
US Billboard 200	91
US Top R&B/Hip-Hop Albums (Billboard)	35
US Top Rap Albums (Billboard)	15

== Certifications ==
Region	Certification	Certified units/sales
United States (RIAA)	Gold	500,000^{^}
^{^} Shipments figures based on certification alone.
