= Young, Fly & Flashy, Vol. 1 =

Jermaine Dupri Presents... Young, Fly & Flashy Vol. 1

Compilation album by Jermaine Dupri
- Released: July 19, 2005
- Recorded: 2004–2005
- Genre: Southern hip-hop
- Length: 44:38
- Labels: So So Def; Virgin; EMI
- Producers: DJ Squeeky; Don Vito; Free Agentz; H; Jamall "Pimpin" Willingham; Jermaine Dupri; Joe The Ceo; Mike The Track Blazer; Nitti

Jermaine Dupri chronology
12 Soulful Nights of Christmas (1998)	Jermaine Dupri Presents... Young, Fly & Flashy Vol. 1 (2005)

Singles from Jermaine Dupri Presents... Young, Fly & Flashy Vol. 1
- 1. "Gotta Getcha" Released: June 14, 2005; 2. "I Think They Like Me (Remix)" Released: August 13, 2005

Professional ratings
Review scores
Source	Rating
AllMusic	2.5/5 stars
Entertainment Weekly	D+
HipHopDX	3/5
RapReviews	5.5/10
Vibe	2.5/5

Young Fly and Flashy Vol. 1 is the second compilation album presented by American rapper and record producer Jermaine Dupri. It was released on July 19, 2005, via So So Def/Virgin Records. Production was handled by Nitti, DJ Squeeky, Don Vito, Free Agentz, H, Joe The Ceo, Mike the Track Blazer, Pimpin', and Dupri himself, with co-producers Cheese, LRoc, Plutonium and Rob Z. It features contributions from Daz Dillinger, Pastor Troy, Young Capone, Bun B, Cato, Da Brat, Dem Franchize Boyz, J-Kwon, Kavious, K. P. & Envyi, Lil' Bow Wow, Ms. B'havin, Stat Quo, the Kid Slim, Torica, T-Roc, T. Waters, Johntá Austin, C-Dirt, Champagne Shawty, and Midnight. The album debuted at number 43 on the Billboard 200 and number 12 on the Top R&B/Hip-Hop Albums charts in the United States. Its lead single, "Gotta Getcha", peaked at number 60 on the Billboard Hot 100 and number 31 on the Hot R&B/Hip-Hop Songs charts. The second single off of the album, "I Think They Like Me (Remix)", made it to number 15 on the Billboard Hot 100 and topped the Hot R&B/Hip-Hop Songs charts.

== Track listing ==
No.	Title	Writer(s)	Producer(s)	Length
1.	"I'm Hot" (featuring Young Capone, Daz Dillinger and T-Rock)	Rodriguez Vashaun Smith; Delmar Arnaud; Tenarius Lamar Richardson; Michael Armour; Brandon Taylor	Mike The Track Blazer; Nitti	3:54
2.	"Gotta Getcha" (featuring Johntá Austin)	Jermaine Dupri Mauldin; James Elbert Phillips; Melissa A. Elliott	Jermaine Dupri; LRoc (co.)	2:50
3.	"Kodak Moment (RMX)" (featuring Kavious, Bun B and Pastor Troy)	Kavious Johnson; Bernard Freeman; Micah Troy; Joseph Dewayne Collins; Mario Mims	Joe The Ceo; Rob Z (co.); Plutonium (co.)	4:19
4.	"I Think They Like Me (RMX)" (featuring Dem Franchize Boyz, Da Brat and Lil' Bow Wow)	Bernard Leverette; Jamall Willingham; Mauldin; Shawntae Harris; Jaron C. Alston; D'Angelo Hunt	Jamall "Pimpin" Willingham	4:43
5.	"So What" (featuring Cato)	Corey Treyon Cato	Free Agentz	3:53
6.	"Throw'd Off" (featuring T. Waters)	Anthony David Waters; Harry Ballestero	H	3:49
7.	"Just to Fight" (featuring Pastor Troy)	Troy; Tevin Hatchett	DJ Squeaky	3:41
8.	"Grown Man" (featuring Miss B and Torica)	Brandy Ladavion Hambrick; Torica Unisha Cornelius; Chadron S. Moore; Douglas B. Gibbs; R. Johnson	Nitti	3:47
9.	"10 Toes" (featuring the Kid Slim, Daz Dillinger, J-Kwon and Stat Quo)	Mauldin; Alston; Arnaud; Jerrell C. Jones; Stanley Bernard Benton; Moore	Nitti	3:38
10.	"Put Cha Hands Up" (featuring K. P. & Envyi)	Susan Hedgepeth; Kia Rosetta Phillips; Rodney Richards	Don Vito; Cheese (co.)	3:06
11.	"Young, Fly & Flashy" (featuring Young Capone, Midnight, Champagne Shawty and C Dirt)		Nitti; Young Capone	6:58
Total length:				44:38

Notes

- Track 11 is a bonus track.

== Personnel ==
- Jermaine Dupri – performer (tracks: 2, 4, 9), producer (track 2), mixing (track 9), executive producer
- Rodriquez "Young Capone" Smith – performer (tracks: 1, 11), producer & recording (track 11)
- Delmar "Daz Dillinger" Arnaud – performer (tracks: 1, 9)
- Tenarius "T-Rock" Richardson – performer (track 1)
- Johntá Austin – additional vocals (track 2)
- Kavious Johnson – performer (track 3)
- Bernard "Bun B" Freeman – performer (track 3)
- Micah "Pastor" Troy – performer (tracks: 3, 7)
- Jamall "Pimpin" Willingham – performer & producer (track 4)
- Maurice "Parlae" Gleaton – performer (track 4)
- Bernard "Jizzal Man" Leverette – performer (track 4)
- Gerald "Buddie" Tiller – performer (track 4)
- Shawntae "Da Brat" Harris – performer (track 4)
- Shad "Lil' Bow Wow" Moss – performer (track 4)
- Corey Treyon Cato – performer (track 5)
- Anthony Waters – performer (track 6)
- Hayward "DJ Squeeky" Ivy – backing vocals, producer, recording & mixing (track 7)
- Brandy "Ms. B'Havin" Hambrick – performer (track 8)
- Torica Cornelius – performer (track 8)
- DeeJay – additional keyboards (track 8)
- Jaron "Slim" Alston – performer (track 9)
- Jerrell "J-Kwon" Jones – performer (track 9)
- Stanley "Stat Quo" Benton – performer (track 9)
- Khia Phillips – performer (track 10)
- Susan Hedgepeth – performer (track 10)
- McArthur "Midnight" Robbins Jr. – performer (track 11)
- Champagne Shawty – performer (track 11)
- C Dirt – performer (track 11)
- Chadron "Nitti" Moore – producer (tracks: 1, 8, 9, 11), mixing (tracks: 1, 8, 11), recording (track 8)
- Michael "Mike The Track Blazer" Armour – producer (track 1)
- James "LRoc" Phillips – co-producer (track 2)
- Joseph "Joe Blow CEO" Collins – producer (track 3)
- Rob Z – co-producer (track 3)
- Barry "Plutonium" Walker – co-producer (track 3)
- Free Agentz – producer & recording (track 5)
- Harry "H" Ballestero – producer & recording (track 6)
- Rodney "Don Vito" Richard – producer & recording (track 10)
- Cheese – co-producer (track 10)
- Brandon Taylor – recording (track 1)
- John Frye – mixing (tracks: 1, 4, 5, 8, 10), recording (track 2)
- Phil Tan – mixing (tracks: 2, 9)
- Tadd Mingo – recording assistant (track 2)
- Colin Leonard – recording (track 3)
- Ray C – mixing (track 3)
- Ben Zales – recording (track 4)
- John Horesco IV – recording (track 4), mixing assistant (track 9)
- Scott Robertson – recording & mixing (track 4)
- Ken "Duro" Ifill – mixing (track 6)
- Brian Frye – recording (track 9)
- Michael Barrett – mixing (track 11)
- Vlado Meller – mastering
- Eddie "Skeeter Rock" Weathers – co-executive producer
- Sterling J. Carroll III – production coordinator
- Mark Mann – photography
- Jonathan Mannion – photography

== Charts ==
Chart (2005)	Peak position
US Billboard 200	43
US Top R&B/Hip-Hop Albums (Billboard)	12
