= A Dozen Roses (You Remind Me) =

Single by Monica

from the album The Makings of Me
- Released: September 5, 2006
- Studio: Goldmind Studios, Hit Factory Criteria (Miami, Florida)
- Length: 3:52
- Label: J
- Songwriters: Missy Elliott; Corte Ellis; Curtis Mayfield
- Producers: Missy Elliot; Cliff Jones; David "Davey Boy" Lindsey

Monica singles chronology
"Everytime tha Beat Drop" (2006)	"A Dozen Roses (You Remind Me)" (2006)	"Sideline Ho" (2007)

Audio sample
- file; help

"A Dozen Roses (You Remind Me)" is a song by American singer Monica taken from her fifth studio album The Makings of Me (2006). It was written by rapper-producer Missy Elliott and Corte Ellis, with production helmed by the former along with David "Davey Boy" Lindsey and Cliff Jones. Similar to songs that Monica used to record with Elliott for her previous album, After the Storm (2003), the mid-tempo love song draws from the genres from R&B, hip hop, neo soul, as well as quiet storm and contains elements of 1960s Motown soul music. Built around a sample of the 1972 recording "The Makings of You" as written and performed by Curtis Mayfield, its lyrics detail a woman's admiration for a man.

The song was released as the album's second single in the United States on September 5, 2006. It garnered generally positive reviews by music critics who compared it to R. Kelly's "You Remind Me of Something" (1995) and praised Elliott's nostalgic, cozy and unpretentious production. "A Dozen Roses (You Remind Me)" peaked at number 48 on the US Billboard Hot R&B/Hip-Hop Songs chart, on which it became the singer's lowest-charting singles since 1999's "Street Symphony". The music video for "A Dozen Roses (You Remind Me)", directed Chris Robinson, was filmed in October 2006 and depicts a meet cute between two lovers.

== Background ==
"A Dozen Roses (You Remind Me)" was composed by rapper Missy Elliott and singer-songwriter Corte Ellis and is one out of three songs the former contributed to The Makings of Me. Production was handled by Elliott along with Cliff Jones, and David "Davey Boy" Lindsey. The song samples Curtis Mayfield's 1970 record "The Makings of You". Due to the sample, he received co-writing credits on the track. Lyrically, it has the female protagonist singing about finding love and passion with her man. She compares him to a pair of Gucci shoes, a Bentley Coupe, and Abercrombie jeans, among other household objects, borrowing from R. Kelly's 2003 song “Ignition (Remix)” (“You remind of these things; something like R. Kelly singing ’bout a Jeep.”).

Speaking of her work with Elliott, Monica described "A Dozen Roses (You Remind Me)" as a prime example of Elliott's ability to "bring the old side of music [...] to the new side of things", referring to the rapper's idea to combinate music by the likes "of Gladys Knight, and Curtis Mayfield" with contemporary beats. Monica called the track one of her personal favorites on the album, and added: "I think the honesty of the record is what will hopefully help people gravitate to it. I don't want to do anything contrived. I want people to know I've been through the same situations as them and that's why I share so many of my personal experiences. In the process, I've still been able to live my dreams, and I want people to see that side of it."

== Reception ==
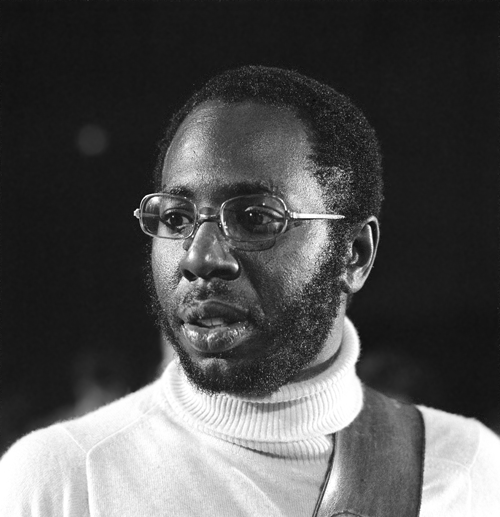
The song is built around Curtis Mayfield's record "The Makings of You".

On May 26, 2006, an early version of "A Dozen Roses (You Remind Me)", featuring a significantly different beginning from the one on The Makings of Me, was leaked onto the internet via Rate the Music, a website that asks people's opinions on new tracks from various artists. Upon its release, "A Dozen Roses (You Remind Me)" received generally mixed to positive reviews by music critics. Mark Edward Nero from About.com called it "one of the best songs" off The Makings of Me and described it as "a lush, feel-good, midtempo track." He felt it problematic, however, that the song was "a direct thematic clone of R. Kelly's 'You Remind Me of Something'." Allmusic's Andy Kellman ranked the song among the standout tracks on the album and called it "practically a replay of the similarly nostalgia-tinted 'So Gone,' albeit a welcomed one." Ryan Dombal of Entertainment Weekly praised the song's "hints at mature contentment" and "cozy" nature. Boise magazine's Michael Butler declared it "sentimental without being pretentious."

The single was serviced on September 28, 2006 to urban radios in the United States. "A Dozen Roses" debuted at number 73 on the Billboard Hot R&B/Hip-Hop Songs chart. The song charted only on the Billboard's Hot R&B/Hip-Hop Songs chart at number 48, missing the Billboard Hot 100.

== Music video ==
The music video for "A Dozen Roses (You Remind Me)" was filmed by American director Chris Robinson, who also shot Monica's videos to "All Eyez on Me", "So Gone" and "Knock Knock". It was recorded in Los Angeles, California in October 2006 amid a promotional tour in support of the album's release. Actor Jamie Hector appeared as Monica's love interest in the video. Tracked by BET's documentary series Access Granted, it premiered on November 15, 2006 following its making of episode.

== Formats and track listings ==
Promo CD single

1. "A Dozen Roses (You Remind Me)" (Radio Edit) – 3:56
2. "A Dozen Roses (You Remind Me)" (Instrumental) – 3:56
3. "A Dozen Roses (You Remind Me)" (Call Out Hook) – 0:16
4. "Everytime tha Beat Drop" (Photo Gallery)

Vinyl single

1. "A Dozen Roses (You Remind Me)" (Radio Mix) – 3:52
2. "A Dozen Roses (You Remind Me)" (Instrumental) – 3:53
3. "A Dozen Roses (You Remind Me)" (Radio Mix) – 3:53
4. "A Dozen Roses (You Remind Me)" (Radio Mix Acapella) – 3:45

== Credits and personnel ==
Credits adapted from the liner notes of The Makings of Me.

- Monica Arnold — vocals
- Missy Elliott — production, additional vocals
- Cliff Jones — co-production
- Dave Kutch — mastering
- David "Davey Box" Lindsey — co-production
- Paul J. Falcone — audio mixing

== Charts ==
Chart performance for "A Dozen Roses"
Chart (2006)	Peak position
US Adult R&B Songs (Billboard)	37
US Hot R&B/Hip-Hop Songs (Billboard)	48
