= Our World, Our Way =

Studio album by Dem Franchize Boyz
- Released: September 30, 2008
- Genres: Crunk; snap; Southern hip hop
- Length: 59:17
- Label: Koch
- Producers: Maestro; Jermaine Dupri; T-Pain; Mannie Fresh; Marvelous J; Parlae; Jim Jonsin; Nitty; Young Juvie; TracKings LLC.; Trabeats; Bangladesh

Dem Franchize Boyz chronology
On Top of Our Game (2006)	Our World, Our Way (2008)

Singles from Our World, Our Way
- 1. "Talkin' Out da Side of Ya Neck!" Released: January 22, 2008; 2. "Turn Heads" Released: August 12, 2008

Professional ratings
Review scores
Source	Rating
RapReviews	4/10

Our World, Our Way is the third and final studio album by Dem Franchize Boyz. It was their only album on Koch Records, and was released September 30, 2008.

The album's first single is "Talkin' Out da Side of Ya Neck!." Other tracks on the album "Mr. Feel Good" (featuring Mannie Fresh) and "Turn Heads" (featuring Lloyd). Bangladesh, the producer of "Bossy" by Kelis, produced "Talkin' Out da Side of Ya Neck," released as a single in January.

Others involved in the project include members of the group Pretty Ricky and producer Maestro.

Recently it was announced that the group has been released from capitol and has signed to Koch Records, where the album will have a new name and a new release date. The current single from the album is "Turn Heads", a collaboration with R&B singer Lloyd. The song premiered on August 12, 2008 and the video premiered on Yahoo! Music on August 28.

== Track listing ==
1. "Get Cha Hustle On" (produced by Nitti)
2. "Put U On" (produced by Maestro)
3. "Mr. Feel Good" (featuring Mannie Fresh)
4. "Come Come" (featuring Blaze) (produced by Marvelous J)
5. "Shawty Foreal" (featuring JR Get Money)
6. "Talkin' Out da Side of Ya Neck!" (produced by Bangladesh)
7. "Turn Heads" (featuring Lloyd) (produced by L.T. Moe)
8. "Roll Ya Arms" (featuring Peanut and Joe Blow) (produced by TracKings LLC.)
9. "#1 Girl" (featuring J Que) (produced by Maestro)
10. "Make Ya Mad" (produced by Trabeats)
11. "The Life" (featuring City Black)
12. "I'm Fresh"
13. "The Killers, The Dealers"
14. "It's a Go" (iTunes bonus track) (produced by Maestro)
15. "Choosin'" (iTunes Bonus Track) (produced by Parlae and Maestro)

== Charts ==
Weekly chart performance for Our World, Our Way
Chart (2008)	Peak position
US Billboard 200	115
US Top R&B/Hip-Hop Albums (Billboard)	19
US Top Rap Albums (Billboard)	10
