= I'm a Flirt =

2007 single by Bow Wow featuring R. Kelly

Single by Bow Wow featuring R. Kelly

from the album The Price of Fame
- Released: March 2, 2007 (US)
- Recorded: 2006
- Genre: Hip hop; R&B
- Length: 4:36
- Label: So So Def Recordings; LBW Entertainment; Sony Urban Music; Columbia
- Songwriters: Shad Moss; Robert Kelly; Ronnie Jackson
- Producer: Lil' Ronnie

Bow Wow singles chronology
"Outta My System" (2007)	"I'm a Flirt" (2007)	"Don't Know About That" (2007)

R. Kelly singles chronology
"Go Getta" (2007)	"I'm a Flirt" (2007)	"Make It Rain (Remix)" (2007)

"I'm a Flirt (Remix)"

Single by R. Kelly featuring T.I. and T-Pain

from the album Double Up
- Released: March 2, 2007 (US)
- Recorded: 2006
- Genre: R&B; hip hop
- Length: 5:32 (album version); 5:09 (clean radio edit)
- Label: Jive
- Songwriters: Robert Kelly; Shad Moss; Ronnie Jackson; Clifford Harris Jr.; Faheem Najm
- Producer: Lil' Ronnie

R. Kelly singles chronology
"Go Getta" (2007)	"I'm a Flirt (Remix)" (2007)	"Make It Rain (Remix)" (2007)

T-Pain singles chronology
"Outta My System" (2007)	"I'm a Flirt (Remix)" (2007)	"Buy U a Drank (Shawty Snappin')" (2007)

T.I. singles chronology
"We Fly High (Remix)" (2006)	"I'm a Flirt (Remix)" (2007)	"Make It Rain (Remix)" (2007)

"I'm a Flirt" is a song by American rapper Bow Wow featuring American singer R. Kelly. The song was scheduled to be the second single released from Bow Wow's fifth album The Price of Fame but the decision was changed to "Outta My System". Instead, it appears as a bonus track on the album. The remix of "I'm a Flirt" became the first single from R. Kelly's album Double Up and peaked at number 12 on the Billboard Hot 100. This video was premiered on BET'S Access Granted on March 7, 2007.

== Music video ==
The music video is directed by Benny Boom.

== Unique chart methodology ==
For the song's chart run in the United States, Billboard magazine listed both versions of the song at one position on its music charts, even though R. Kelly's version received more radio play and downloads. This was explained in Michael Paoletta's "Inside Track" column in the March 3, 2007, print edition of the magazine:

Versions of the song have been recorded by both Bow Wow and R. Kelly. Bow Wow's version features Kelly, who co-penned the track, while Kelly's version features T.I. and T-Pain. Due to the similar characteristics of each song, the plays for both versions will be totalled under one chart listing. "I'm a Flirt" first appeared on Bow Wow's Columbia/Sony Music album 'The Price of Fame' as a bonus hidden track. iTunes shoppers, though, can purchase the track as a single, as Columbia has download rights—but not the singles rights to promote it to radio. Kelly's 2007 album 'Double Up' includes his version of the song.

== Charts ==
=== Weekly charts ===
Chart (2007)	Peak position
Australia (ARIA)	59
Australian Urban (ARIA)	16
Germany (GfK)	55
Ireland (IRMA)	37
New Zealand (Recorded Music NZ)	20
Switzerland (Schweizer Hitparade)	78
UK Singles (OCC)	18
US Billboard Hot 100	12
US Hot R&B/Hip-Hop Songs (Billboard)	2
US Pop Airplay (Billboard)	38
US Hot Rap Songs (Billboard)	1
US Rhythmic Airplay (Billboard)	5

=== Year-end charts ===
Chart (2007)	Position
US Billboard Hot 100	49
US Hot R&B/Hip-Hop Songs (Billboard)	15

== Certifications ==
Region	Certification	Certified units/sales
New Zealand (RMNZ) For remix version	Platinum	30,000^{‡}
United States (RIAA) Mastertone, for remix version	Platinum	1,000,000^{*}
^{*} Sales figures based on certification alone.^{‡} Sales+streaming figures based on certification alone.
