= Sideline Ho =

Single by Monica

from the album The Makings of Me
- Released: September 19, 2006
- Studio: Doppler Studios (Atlanta, Georgia)
- Genre: R&B
- Length: 3:47
- Label: J
- Songwriters: Durrell Babbs; Eric Dawkins; Antonio Dixon; Harvey Mason, Jr.; Steve Russell; Damon Thomas
- Producers: The Underdogs; Tank (co.)

Monica singles chronology
"A Dozen Roses (You Remind Me)" (2006)	"Sideline Ho" (2006)	"Hell No (Leave Home)" (2007)

"Sideline Ho" is a song by American singer Monica. It was written by Harvey Mason, Jr., Damon Thomas, Antonio Dixon, Eric Dawkins, Steve Russell, and Durrell "Tank" Babbs for her fourth studio album, The Makings of Me (2006). Production was helmed by Mason and Thomas under their production moniker The Underdogs, with Tank credited as co-producer of the song. "Sideline Ho" was released as the album's third single in the third quarter of 2006. It opened at number 77 on US Billboard's Hot R&B/Hip-Hop Songs chart on early airplay alone, and achieved a peak of number 45 on that chart.

Although "Sideline Ho" had a successful debut on the R&B charts, J Records refused to agree on producing a music video for the song at first, and on January 19, 2007, a video clip of Monica asking fans to sign an online petition to help convince her record company to release a video for the single was leaked onto the internet. While several sources reported that the singer and her team "had started writing treatments for the 'Sideline Ho' video" by late February 2007, ideas for a video were eventually scrapped.

== Background ==
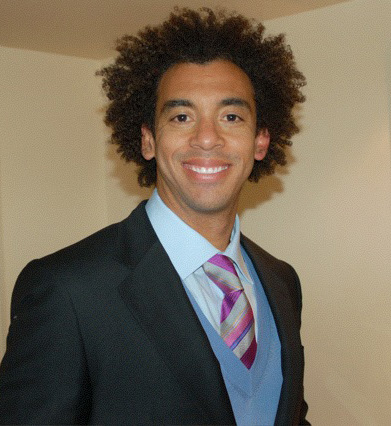
Producer Harvey Mason, Jr. of The Underdogs produced "Sideline Ho".

"Sideline Ho" is one out of two songs on The Makings of Me Monica worked on with production team The Underdogs and singer-songwriter Tank at Doppler Studios in Atlanta, Georgia. The concept of the song came up while Monica was brainstorming ideas with several musicians and was inspired by an ex who cheated on her with a video model. Speaking of how the song came about, Monica stated in an interview with Billboard in August 2008, that the record was about "me being in a relationship years ago and somebody just disrespected to the fullest." During the process, she told Tank about a situation where an ex of hers "blatantly, openly cheated – as if people didn't know who his girlfriend was! And just the sound of her name would make my flesh crawl. So he was like, 'Well what did you call her?' I said, 'She has no name. She has no importance [...] I always referred to her as the 'sideline ho,' because she was too comfortable with her position." While Monica remarked that she "never would've thought he would come back in the room, like 'that's the title of the song', she went on to "give him play by play details", which she had previously documented in a self-written poem and "that really stood out in my mind and they created a song around it."

== Critical reception ==
"Sideline Ho" garnered positive reviews from music critics. People magazine called the song a "bittersweet ballad, on which Monica puts the other woman precisely in her place", while Rap-Up magazine noted that "though she may be as laid back as ever on this track, Monica really digs her nails into girls’ weaves." Blog network Blogcritics declared "Sideline Ho" a "blistering song where Monica takes the other woman in her man's life to task", and added: "This song is a bit rougher than what we're used to hearing from Monica but she somehow keeps herself from crossing the line between angry and over the top." Prefix magazine writer Norman Mayers noted that the track "combines her bitchy attitude and ghetto persona with bass-heavy mid- to slow-tempo grooves to joyous effect," while Ryan Dombal of Entertainment Weekly wrote that it "scores with tough-talking venom." In her album review for Vibe, Laura Checkoway ranked the song among the best on The Makings of Me along with "Hell No (Leave Home)" and "Gotta Move On".

== Release and performance ==
On July 25, 2006, AOL Music was the first entertainment website to preview a full version of the song. By July 26, 2006, the entire track had leaked onto the internet. A more up-tempo remix of "Sidelino Ho," co-produced by Greg Street and Carl Moe, later appeared on the singer's 2007 mixtape Monica: Made; and though a few sources confirmed that a more radio-friendly version called "Sideline Chick" had also been recorded, a so-called "Squeaky Clean version" was finally included on the song's limited CD single, released on February 5, 2007, in the United States. Upon its release, the singer described the song as both her "actual favorite" on the album and one of her "most personal records ever" yet.

The single was not officially released to U.S. radio until mid-February 2007, but appeared a few weeks early on the Billboard Hot R&B/Hip-Hop Songs chart, opening up at number 77 due to early airplay in the week of January 22, 2007. After weeks of minor to moderate radio support the song eventually reached number 45 on particular chart, only slightly surpassing the peak position of previous single, "A Dozen Roses (You Remind Me)."

== Track listings ==
CD single

1. "Sideline Ho" (Album Version) – 3:47
2. "Sideline Ho" (Squeaky Clean Version) – 3:47
3. "Sideline Ho" (Instrumental) – 3:44
4. "Sideline Ho" (Call Out Hook) – 0:10
5. "Sideline Ho" (Squeaky Clean Version Call Out Hook) – 0:10

Promotional CD single

1. "Sideline Ho" (Album Version) – 3:47
2. "Sideline Ho" (Radio Version) – 3:52

== Credits and personnel ==
Credits adapted from the liner notes of The Makings of Me.

- Production – The Underdogs
- Co–Production – Tank
- Recording – Dabling "Hobby Boy" Howard
- Recording assistant – Aaron Renner
- Mixing – The Underdogs
- Instrumentation – The Underdogs, Tank

== Charts ==
Weekly chart performance for "Sideline Ho"
Chart (2007)	Peak position
US Hot R&B/Hip-Hop Songs (Billboard)	45

== Release history ==
Release dates and formats for "Sideline Ho"
Region	Format	Date	Label
United States	Digital download	February 5, 2007	J
United States	Mainstream radio	February 5, 2007	J
