= Outta My System =

Single by Bow Wow featuring T-Pain and Johntá Austin

from the album The Price of Fame
- Released: February 13, 2007
- Recorded: 2006
- Genre: Hip-hop; R&B
- Length: 3:58
- Label: Columbia
- Songwriters: Jermaine Mauldin; Faheem Najm; Johntá Austin; Jaron Alston; Rick James
- Producers: Jermaine Dupri; LRoc; No I.D.

Bow Wow singles chronology
| "Shortie Like Mine" (2006) | "Outta My System" (2007) | "I'm a Flirt" (2007) |

T-Pain singles chronology
| "U and Dat" (2006) | "Outta My System" (2007) | "I'm a Flirt" (remix) (2007) |

Johntá Austin singles chronology
| "Shortie Like Mine" (2006) | "Outta My System" (2007) | "Video" (2008) |

"Outta My System" is a song by American rapper Bow Wow. It is the second and final single off his fifth studio album The Price of Fame. It features American singers T-Pain and Johntá Austin. The original next single was supposed to be "I'm a Flirt" but was cancelled in favor of "Outta My System". R. Kelly being preoccupied on the charts with Snoop Dogg's "That's That Shit" and Young Jeezy's "Go Getta" is what led "I'm a Flirt" being delayed.

The song peaked at number 22 on the Billboard Hot 100, his eighth top 40 hit and T-Pain's sixth top 40 hit on that chart. It also peaked at number 2 and 12 on the Hot Rap Songs and Hot R&B/Hip-Hop Songs charts respectively and number 7 in New Zealand. The video premiered on Valentine's Day on BET's Access Granted.

The song was written by Jaron Alston (an in-house ghostwriter for So So Def Recordings, known then as "Kid Slim") and Jermaine Dupri, with a sample credit from Rick James (from the song "Hollywood"). It was produced by Dupri along with LRoc and No I.D.

== Song and video information ==
The song uses a sample of Rick James' "Hollywood".

In late December 2006, Bow Wow confirmed in an appearance on 106 & Park that this song is about his breakup with Ciara, his former girlfriend.

In a July 2016 interview with DJ Vlad, Bow Wow admitted that his relationship with Ciara not working out was mostly his own fault. Stating that when he and Ciara first starting dating, he would spend as much time with her as he could (even if this meant just staying at home) and he hardly went out with his other friends. This caused Bow Wow's friends to scold him for not living his youth to the fullest and telling him "You're acting like a grandpa at age 19. You can sit down when you're older. This is the time you need to be out and enjoying life". Due to this scrutiny, Bow Wow started to focus more on staying out all night, clubbing, partying, and not wanting to be at home (much to dismay of Ciara).

The music video hit number 1 on "106 and Park" in just 7 days, but afterwards went down to number 8 and then fell off the countdown. Whereas, the music video for the previous single "Shortie Like Mine" went number 1 and stayed on the countdown for 43+ days.

== Commercial performance ==
"Outta My System" debuted at number 76 on the Billboard Hot 100 the week of March 10, 2007. Ten weeks later, it peaked at number 22 the week of May 26, 2007. It stayed on the chart for twenty weeks.

== Charts ==
=== Weekly charts ===
| Chart (2007) | Peak position |
|---|---|
| New Zealand (Recorded Music NZ) | 7 |
| US Billboard Hot 100 | 22 |
| US Hot R&B/Hip-Hop Songs (Billboard) | 12 |
| US Hot Rap Songs (Billboard) | 2 |
| US Pop Airplay (Billboard) | 27 |
| US Rhythmic Airplay (Billboard) | 2 |

=== Year-end charts ===
| Chart (2007) | Position |
|---|---|
| New Zealand (Recorded Music NZ) | 40 |
| US Billboard Hot 100 | 88 |
| US Hot R&B/Hip-Hop Songs (Billboard) | 59 |
| US Rhythmic (Billboard) | 23 |

== Certifications ==
| Region | Certification | Certified units/sales |
|---|---|---|
| New Zealand (RMNZ) | Gold | 7,500^{*} |
| United States (RIAA) Mastertone | Platinum | 1,000,000^{*} |
^{*} Sales figures based on certification alone.
