= On Top of Our Game =

Studio album by Dem Franchize Boyz
- Released: February 7, 2006
- Genres: Crunk; snap; southern hip hop
- Length: 59:28
- Labels: Virgin America; So So Def
- Producers: Jamall "Pimpin" Willingham; Delarmon “P-NO” Harold; Maurice "Parlae" Gleaton; Jermaine Dupri; Vaushaun "Maestro" Brooks; Jim Jonsin; DJ Montay; Young Juvie; Michael "5000" Watts

Dem Franchize Boyz chronology
Dem Franchize Boyz (2004)	On Top of Our Game (2006)	Our World, Our Way (2008)

Singles from On Top of Our Game
- 1. "I Think They Like Me" Released: September 27, 2005; 2. "Lean wit It, Rock wit It" Released: November 17, 2005; 3. "Ridin' Rims" Released: February 28, 2006

Professional ratings
Review scores
Source	Rating
About.com	2.5/5 stars
AllMusic	3.5/5 stars
Blender	3/5 stars
HipHopDX	0.5/5 stars
Los Angeles Times	3/4 stars
RapReviews	4.5/10
Rolling Stone	2/5 stars
Virgin Media	3/5 stars

On Top of Our Game is the second studio album by Atlanta-based rap group Dem Franchize Boyz. It was released on February 7, 2006, by Virgin Records America and Jermaine Dupri's So So Def.

== Commercial performance ==
On Top of Our Game debuted and peaked at number 5 on the Billboard 200, with 106,000 copies sold in its first week. It also reached the top of Billboard's Top Rap Albums and number two on the magazine's Top R&B/Hip-Hop Albums chart. On March 16, 2006, the album was certified gold by the Recording Industry Association of America (RIAA).

== Track listing ==
On Top of Our Game track listing
No.	Title	Writer(s)	Producer(s)	Length
1.	"My Music" (featuring Bun B)	Jamall Willingham; Maurice Gleaton; Bernard Leverette; Gerald Tiller; Jermaine Dupri; James Phillips; Bernard Freeman; Chad Butler; Leroy Williams	Jermaine Dupri; LRoc	3:45
2.	"I Think They Like Me (Remix)" (featuring Jermaine Dupri, Da Brat, and Bow Wow)	Willingham; Leverette; D'Angelo Hunt; Dupri; Shawntae Harris; Jaron Alston	Jamall "Pimpin" Willingham	4:42
3.	"Ridin' Rims"	Willingham; Gleaton; Leverette; Tiller; Courtney Travis	Young Juve	5:23
4.	"Bricks 4 the High" (featuring Jim Jones and Damon Dash)	Willingham; Gleaton; Leverette; Tiller; Joseph Jones	Delarmon "P-NO" Harold	4:54
5.	"You Know What It Is"	Willingham; Gleaton; Leverette; Tiller; Vashaun Brooks	Maestro	3:57
6.	"Lean wit It, Rock wit It" (featuring Peanut and Charlay)	Willingham; Tiller; Leverette; Gleaton; Hunt; Robert Hill; Charles Hammond; Rodney Hill	Parlae; Buck	3:49
7.	"Freaky as She Wanna Be" (featuring Trey Songz)	Willingham; Gleaton; Leverette; Tiller; Travis; Tremaine Neverson	Young Juve	6:14
8.	"Stop Callin' Me"	Willingham; Gleaton; Leverette; Tiller; Kendall Jackson	Kenny Kold	4:18
9.	"Give Props"	Willingham; Gleaton; Leverette; Tiller; Brooks	Maestro	4:52
10.	"Suckas Come 'n' Try Me" (featuring Unk)	Willingham; Gleaton; Leverette; Tiller; Anthony Platt; Montay Humphrey	DJ Montay	4:26
11.	"Don't Play with Me" (featuring Three 6 Mafia)	Willingham; Gleaton; Leverette; Tiller; Brooks; Darnell Carlton; Jordan Houston; Paul Beauregard	Maestro	4:31
12.	"They Don't Like That"	Willingham; Gleaton; Leverette; Tiller; Jackson	Kenny Kold	3:57
Total length:				59:28

=== Chopped and screwed version ===
There is a deluxe version of the album with a bonus DVD, and there is also another version of this album which was chopped and screwed by Michael 5000 Watts for the Swishahouse label.

1. "My Music" (featuring Bun B) – 4:49
2. "I Think They Like Me" (So So Def Remix; featuring Jermaine Dupri, Da Brat and Bow Wow) – 6:04
3. "Ridin' Rims" – 6:20
4. "Don't Play with Me" (featuring Three 6 Mafia) – 5:18
5. "You Know What It Is" – 4:39
6. "Suckas Come 'n' Try Me" – 4:31
7. "Lean wit It, Rock wit It" (featuring Peanut and Charlay) – 4:57
8. "Freaky as She Wanna Be" (featuring Trey Songz) – 7:15
9. "Bricks 4 the High" (featuring Jim Jones and Damon Dash) – 6:13
10. "They Don't Like That" – 4:47
11. "Stop Callin' Me" – 5:30
12. "Give Props" – 6:48

== Charts ==
=== Weekly charts ===
Weekly chart performance for On Top of Our Game
Chart (2006)	Peak position
US Billboard 200	5
US Top R&B/Hip-Hop Albums (Billboard)	2
US Top Rap Albums (Billboard)	1

=== Year-end charts ===
Year-end chart performance for On Top of Our Game
Chart (2006)	Position
US Billboard 200	102
US Top R&B/Hip-Hop Albums (Billboard)	24

== Certifications ==
Certifications for On Top of Our Game
Region	Certification	Certified units/sales
United States (RIAA)	Gold	500,000^{^}
^{^} Shipments figures based on certification alone.
