= Ridin' Rims =

Single by Dem Franchize Boyz

from the album On Top of Our Game
- Released: February 28, 2006
- Recorded: 2006
- Genre: Southern hip hop
- Length: 5:23
- Label: So So Def Recordings; Virgin
- Songwriter(s): Maurice Gleaton, Bernard Leverette, Gerald Tiller, Courtney Travis, Jamal Willingham
- Producer(s): Jermaine Dupri

Dem Franchize Boyz singles chronology
"Lean wit It, Rock wit It" (2006)	"Ridin' Rims" (2006)	"Everytime tha Beat Drop" (2008)

"Ridin' Rims" is the third single off Dem Franchize Boyz second album On Top of Our Game.

== Charts ==
The song reached #80 on the Billboard Hot 100, #40 on the Hot R&B/Hip-Hop Songs chart and #22 on the Rap Songs chart.
