= I Think They Like Me =

2005 single by Dem Franchize Boyz

Single by Dem Franchize Boyz featuring Jermaine Dupri, Da Brat and Bow Wow

from the album Young, Fly & Flashy, Vol. 1 and On Top of Our Game
- Released: September 13, 2005
- Length: 4:42
- Label: So So Def; Virgin
- Songwriters: Maurice Gleaton; Jamal Willingham; Bernard Leverette; Gerald Tiller; Jermaine Mauldin; Shad Moss
- Producer: Pimpin'

Dem Franchize Boyz singles chronology
"White Tee" (2004)	"I Think They Like Me" (2005)	"Lean wit It, Rock wit It" (2006)

Jermaine Dupri singles chronology
"Gotta Getcha" (2005)	"I Think They Like Me (Remix)" (2005)	"Get Your Number" (2005)

Da Brat singles chronology
"Girlfight (Remix)" (2005)	"I Think They Like Me (Remix)" (2005)	"Is It Chu?" (2013)

Bow Wow singles chronology
"Like You" (2005)	"I Think They Like Me (Remix)" (2005)	"Fresh Azimiz" (2005)

"I Think They Like Me" is a song by American hip-hop group Dem Franchize Boyz. It was released in August 2005 as a single from their self-titled debut album Dem Franchize Boyz. The song's chorus is sampled from their debut single "White Tee". The single version of the song is the remix version, the "So So Def Remix" featuring Jermaine Dupri, Da Brat and Bow Wow. The remix is featured on their 2006 album On Top of Our Game and was released as the first single from the album. Another remix of the song features the Atlanta-based R&B singer Nivea and rapper Da Brat.

"I Think They Like Me" topped the US Billboard Hot R&B/Hip-Hop Songs chart for three weeks and the Hot Rap Songs chart for two weeks. On the Billboard Hot 100, it reached number 15, giving the group their highest-charting single. Outside the United States, the song became a top-five hit in Finland, reaching number five, and entered the top 30 in New Zealand, peaking at number 27.

== Charts ==
=== Weekly charts ===
Chart (2005–2006)	Peak position
Finland (Suomen virallinen lista)	5
New Zealand (Recorded Music NZ)	27
Scottish Singles Sales (Official Charts)	75
UK Singles (Official Charts)	66
UK Hip Hop/R&B (Official Charts)	14
US Billboard Hot 100	15
US Hot R&B/Hip-Hop Songs (Billboard)	1
US Hot Rap Songs (Billboard)	1
US Pop Airplay (Billboard)	39
US Rhythmic Airplay (Billboard)	7

=== Year-end charts ===
Chart (2005)	Position
US Hot R&B/Hip-Hop Songs (Billboard)	54

Chart (2006)	Position
US Billboard Hot 100	85
US Hot R&B/Hip-Hop Songs (Billboard)	24

== Release history ==
Region	Date	Format(s)	Label	Ref.
United States	September 13, 2005	Rhythmic contemporary radio	So So Def; Virgin	
United States	December 6, 2005	Contemporary hit radio	So So Def; Virgin	
