= Shortie Like Mine =

Single by Bow Wow featuring Chris Brown and Johntá Austin

from the album The Price of Fame
- Released: October 3, 2006
- Recorded: 2006
- Genre: Pop rap; snap; R&B
- Length: 4:28
- Label: Columbia
- Songwriters: Shawntae Harris; Johntá Austin; Jermaine Mauldin; Bryan-Michael Cox
- Producers: Jermaine Dupri; Bryan-Michael Cox

Bow Wow singles chronology
"Fresh Azimiz" (2005)	"Shortie Like Mine" (2006)	"Outta My System" (2007)

Chris Brown singles chronology
"Say Goodbye" (2006)	"Shortie Like Mine" (2006)	"Poppin'" (2006)

Johntá Austin singles chronology
"Turn It Up" (2006)	"Shortie Like Mine" (2006)	"Outta My System" (2007)

Music video
- "Shortie Like Mine" on YouTube

"Shortie like Mine" is a song by rapper Bow Wow. Released on October 3, 2006, it is the first single from his fifth studio album, The Price of Fame (2006). This song features American R&B singers Chris Brown and Johntá Austin. The video ranked at number 19 on BET's Notarized: Top 100 Videos of 2006 countdown. The video also received a BET Award nomination for Viewer's Choice in 2007.

== Critical reception ==
Allmusic's David Jeffries praised the song by highlighting and stated: "Saving the album from being a disaster is perfectly acceptable single; 'Shortie Like Mine' which swaggers with a great hook."

== Music video ==
The music video was filmed in September, 2006, and premiered on BET's Access Granted on October 23, 2006. It was the New Joint on BET's 106 & Park a day later on October 24, 2006. The video for "Shortie Like Mine" has a MySpace theme and was earlier made as a praise record to Ciara. The video features Canadian singer-actress Keshia Chanté and Angela Simmons, the daughter of Rev Run, as well as Rev Run himself. Chris Brown appears in the video, but Johntá Austin does not. The song's producer, Jermaine Dupri, also makes an appearance.

== Chart performance ==
The single debuted at number eighty on the Billboard Hot 100 on October 21, 2006, being the top debut of that week. The song later peaked at number nine on the week of December 16, 2006. It also peaked at number two on the Billboard Hot R&B/Hip-Hop Songs and number one on the Billboard Hot Rap Tracks. The single debuted on BET's 106 & Park chart at number ten on October 17, 2006, just two days after its premiere (excluding weekends). The song was Bow Wow's third to reach the top ten on the Hot 100. It was Brown's fourth. It also peaked at number two in New Zealand and was certified Gold on August 23, 2009, selling over 7,500 copies.

== Charts ==
=== Weekly charts ===
Chart (2006–2007)	Peak position
Australia (ARIA)	36
Australian Urban (ARIA)	4
New Zealand (Recorded Music NZ)	2
US Billboard Hot 100	9
US Hot R&B/Hip-Hop Songs (Billboard)	2
US Hot Rap Songs (Billboard)	1
US Latin Rhythm Airplay (Billboard)	23
US Pop Airplay (Billboard)	18
US Rhythmic Airplay (Billboard)	4

=== Year-end charts ===
Chart (2006)	Position
US Hot R&B/Hip-Hop Songs (Billboard)	95

Chart (2007)	Position
US Billboard Hot 100	54
US Hot R&B/Hip-Hop Songs (Billboard)	44
US Rhythmic (Billboard)	30

== Certifications ==
Region	Certification	Certified units/sales
New Zealand (RMNZ)	2× Platinum	60,000^{‡}
United States (RIAA)	Gold	500,000^{^}
United States (RIAA) (Mastertone)	Platinum	1,000,000^{^}
^{^} Shipments figures based on certification alone.^{‡} Sales+streaming figures based on certification alone.

== See also ==
- List of Billboard number-one rap singles of the 2000s
