= Hell No (Leave Home) =

Single by Monica featuring Twista

from the album The Makings of Me and The Day After (International edition)
- Released: May 14, 2007
- Recorded: October 2005–June 2006; The Black Room (Atlanta, Georgia) at Quad Recording Studios (New York City, New York)
- Length: 4:45
- Label: J
- Songwriters: Bryan Michael Cox; Sean Garrett; Carl Mitchell
- Producers: Bryan Michael Cox; Sean Garrett (co.)

Monica singles chronology
"Sideline Ho" (2007)	"Hell No (Leave Home)" (2007)	"Trust" (2008)

Twista singles chronology
"Don't Get It Twisted" (2006)	"Hell No (Leave Home)" (2007)	"Give It Up" (2007)

"Hell No (Leave Home)" is a song by American singer Monica featuring guest vocals by rapper Twista. It was written by Bryan Michael Cox, Sean Garrett, and Carl Mitchell and produced by former for her fifth studio album, The Makings of Me (2006), with additional production from Garrett, the song was also featured on Twista's fifth studio album The Day After (2005) as an international bonus track. The song was released as the album's fourth and final single on May 14, 2007 in the United States, where it peaked at number 14 on the US Billboard Bubbling Under R&B/Hip-Hop Songs.

== Background ==
"Hell No (Leave Home)" was written by Bryan Michael Cox, Sean Garrett, and Carl "Twista" Mitchell, while production was helmed by the former. Garrett received co-producer credit on the song. "Hell No (Leave Home)" has Monica trading verses with fast-paced rapper Twista. The singer called the recording of the rhymes "comical," telling Ballerstatus in an interview: "He [Twista] had so much patience with me and allowed me to learn his way of rapping. Of course, rapping isn't what I do, but I did enjoy the experience. The way I learned best was with him in the booth."

== Track listings ==
Promo CD single
No.	Title	Length
1.	"Hell No (Leave Home)" (radio edit)	4:13
2.	"Hell No (Leave Home)" (radio edit no rap)	3:13
3.	"Hell No (Leave Home)" (instrumental)	4:45
4.	"Hell No (Leave Home)" (call out hook)	0:10

== Credits and personnel ==
Credits lifted from the liner notes of The Makings of Me.

- Monica Arnold – background vocals, vocals
- Candice Childress – production coordination
- Bryan Michael Cox – instruments, producer, writer
- Sean Garrett – co-producer, writer
- S. Vaughn Merrick – vocal recording
- Carl Mitchell – vocals, writer
- Phil Tan – mixing
- Sam Thomas – additional re-recording, editing

== Charts ==
Chart performance for "Hell No (Leave Home)"
Chart (2008)	Peak position
US Bubbling Under R&B/Hip-Hop Songs (Billboard)	14

== Release history ==
Release dates and formats for "Hell No (Leave Home)"
Country	Date	Format	Label	Ref.
United States	May 14, 2007	radio	J Records	
