= Everytime tha Beat Drop =

Single by Monica featuring Dem Franchize Boyz

from the album The Makings of Me
- Released: July 24, 2006
- Recorded: Southside Studios (Atlanta, Georgia)
- Genre: R&B; snap; crunk&B
- Length: 3:43
- Label: J
- Songwriters: Johntá Austin; Maurice Gleaton; Jamal Willingham; Bernard Leverette; Gerald Tiller; Jermaine Mauldin; James Phillips; D'Angelo Hunt; Charles Hammond; Robert Hill
- Producers: Jermaine Dupri; LRoc

Monica singles chronology
"U Should've Known Better" (2004)	"Everytime tha Beat Drop" (2006)	"A Dozen Roses" (2006)

Dem Franchize Boyz singles chronology
"Ridin' Rims" (2006)	"Everytime tha Beat Drop" (2006)	"Pimped Out" (2006)

Audio sample
- file; help

"Everytime tha Beat Drop" is a song by American singer Monica from her fifth studio album The Makings of Me (2006). It was written by Johnta Austin, Jermaine Dupri, Robert Hill, Charles Hammond, D'Angelo Hunt, LRoc, and rap group Dem Franchize Boyz, while production was hemled by Dupri, with additional credits by LRoc. Musically, the downbeat uptempo track was greatly influenced by crunk and snap music, incorporating a vocal sample of Dem Franchize Boyz's "Lean wit It, Rock wit It" (2005).

A lyrical and musical departure from Monica's previous singles, "Everytime tha Beat Drop" was released as the album's leading single in the United States in July 2006, gaining generally mixed to negative reviews by music critics who called it "untypical" and "avoidable." A moderate success on the charts, it became Monica's tenth top twenty entry on Billboard's Hot R&B/Hip-Hop Songs chart, but failed to reach the top forty on the official Hot 100, becoming her least successful lead single since 2002's "All Eyez on Me."

"Everytime tha Beat Drop" was performed along with Dem Franchize Boyz on several television, such as The Ellen DeGeneres Show, Late Show with David Letterman, MTV's Total Request Live, and BET's 106 & Park. An accompanying music video for the song, directed by Ray Kay, was filmed in Monica's hometown Atlanta, Georgia. The singer later voiced her remorse towards her record company bosses for subsequently deciding to release "Everytime the Beat Drops" as a single, wishing for a more typical record to be released as the first single instead, and dismissed the song as a wrong interpretation of her artistical status.

== Background ==
"Everytime tha Beat Drop" was written by Johnta Austin, producer Jermaine Dupri, and rap group Dem Franchize Boyz members Maurice "Parlae" Gleaton, Jamal "Pimpin'" Willingham, Bernard "Jizzal Man" Leverette, and Gerald "Buddie" Tiller. The song samples a line from Dem Franchize Boyz's 2006 song "Lean wit It, Rock wit It": "Rock, then bend my knees everytime the beat drops." Due to the inclusion of the sample, Robert Hill, James Phillips, D'Angelo "Lil' Peanut" Hunt, and Charles "Charlay" Hammond are also credited as songwriters.

One out of three Dupri-produced songs on The Makings of Me, "Everytime tha Beat Drop" was initially recorded for a shelved mixtape on Dupri's label, So So Def Recordings, but later included on Monica's fifth studio album. Monica has described song as a pure fun record without any special lyrical message but with the attempt to show "something that appears on the outside to be different from" her and that is "a real good representation" of where she is coming from and what she listened and danced to in private throughout the making of the album. "Everytime tha Beat Drop" contains elements of the crunk subgenre snap which, according to Monica, "originated on the West Side of Atlanta [...] If you listen to the sound, you'll always hear a snap somewhere in it." A remix version featuring rappers T.I. and Young Jeezy was released in July 2006.

== Chart performance ==
The song was released on July 24, 2006 to US radios and instantly debuted at number 68 on the US Hot R&B/Hip-Hop Songs chart after only four days of airplay. It eventually peaked at number eleven, becoming Monica's tenth top twenty entry on the chart. On August 3, 2006, "Everytime tha Beat Drop" also debuted at number six on the Billboard Bubbling Under Hot 100 Singles. While it entered the Billboard Hot 100 at number ninety-four in the following week, the song failed to enter the top 50 until its tenth week on particular chart – the same week The Makings of Me became available via digital download. The single eventually reached a peak position of number 48 on the official Hot 100, becoming Monica's least successful lead single since 2002's "All Eyez on Me."

Monica later dismissed the song as a "poor representation of the album." In 2007, she admitted she would have re-worked the promotional strategy for The Makings of Me following the mediocre commercial success of "Everytime tha Beat Drop." Instead of allowing her label to influence the selection of her singles, the singer would have looked more to her fans for opinions, telling hip hop news website SOHH in June 2007: "If I had to do something over again, I'd probably release more than one single and let the audience choose which one they would have wanted to hear [...] I don’t regret doing the song, I regret not fighting with them about making it the first single. We told the label don’t put that out as a first single [...]."

== Music video ==
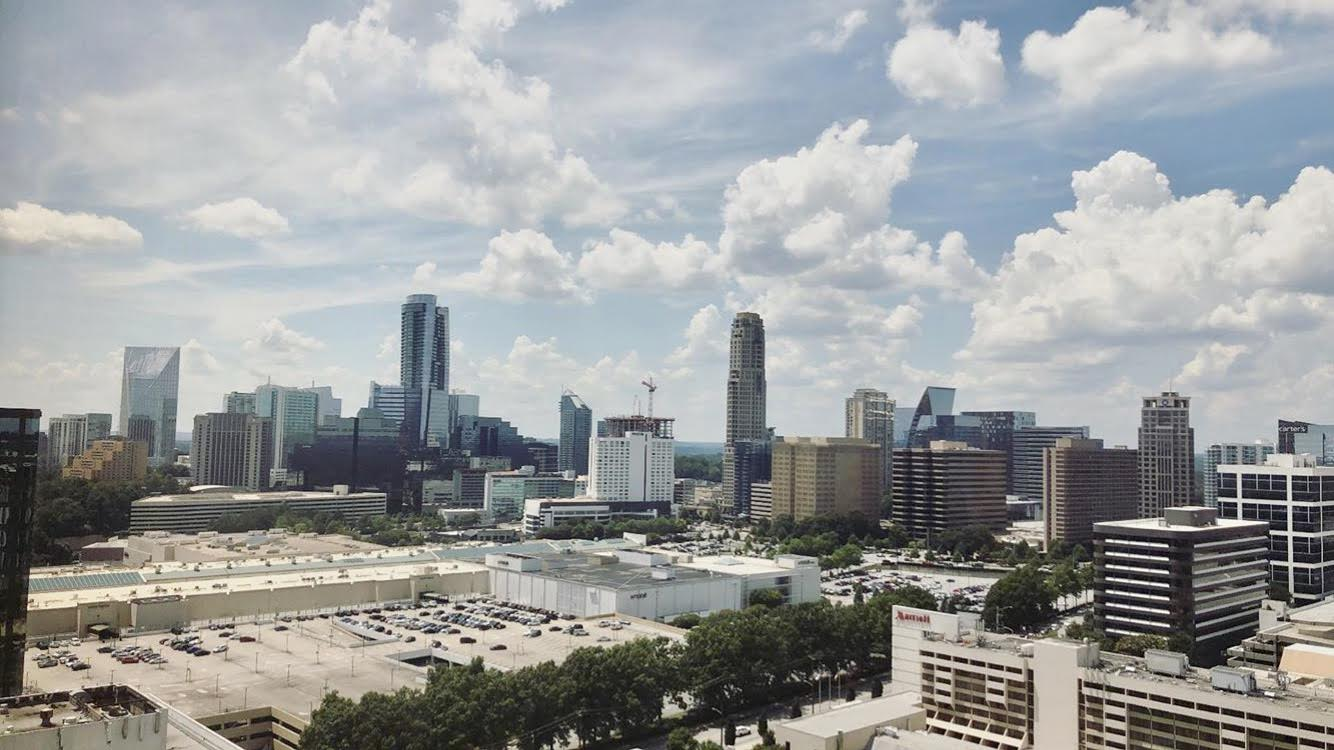
The music video for "Everytime tha Beat Drop" was filmed in the Underwood Hills neighborhood in Buckhead, Atlanta (pictured).

The music video for "Everytime tha Beat Drop" was directed by Norwegian director Ray Kay and film at the PC&E Sound Stage in the Underwood Hills neighborhood in Buckhead, Atlanta, Georgia on July 7 and 8, 2006. It was Monica's first video to be shot in her home town since her very first video for "Don't Take It Personal (Just One of Dem Days)" in 1995, and features appearances by guest rappers Gerald Tiller, Maurice Gleaton, Jamal Willingham, and Bernard Leverette from Dem Franchize Boyz, as well as producer Jermaine Dupri, Chyna Whyte and Monica's younger brother Montez Arnold.

The video does not have a substantial plot but portrays the singer while performing and dancing in front of grey and black colours. Monica and Dem Franchize Boys' scenes are incut by several computer animations and single dance sequences. The clip world premiered at the end of BET's Access Granted and Yahoo! Music on August 2, 2006. It debuted at number sixteen on the U S Billboard Hot Videoclip Tracks chart on the September 6, 2006 edition of the Billboard charts, before falling to number twenty-two on the chart the next week, and leaving it completely off in its third week of release.

== Track listings ==
12-inch single
No.	Title	Length
1.	"Everytime tha Beat Drop" (Main Edit)	3:42
2.	"Everytime tha Beat Drop" (Clean Mix)	3:42
3.	"Everytime tha Beat Drop" (Instrumental)	3:34
4.	"Everytime tha Beat Drop" (Acappella)	3:58

CD single
No.	Title	Length
1.	"Everytime tha Beat Drop" (Clean)	3:42
2.	"Everytime tha Beat Drop" (Dirty)	3:42
3.	"Everytime tha Beat Drop" (Call Out Hook)	0:10

Sample credits

- "Everytime tha Beat Drop" contains a sample of "Lean wit It, Rock wit It" (2006) by Dem Franchize Boyz.

== Credits and personnel ==
Credits lifted from the liner notes of The Makings of Me.

- Monica Arnold – vocals
- Dem Franchize Boyz – vocals
- Jermaine Dupri – mixing, producer
- John Horesco IV – engineer
- Josh Houghkirk – mixing assistance
- Dave Kutch – mastering
- LRoc – additional producer
- Tad "Rowdy" Rik – engineer
- Phil Tan – mixing

== Charts ==
=== Weekly charts ===
Weekly chart performance for "Everytime tha Beat Drop"
Chart (2006)	Peak position
US Billboard Hot 100	48
US Hot R&B/Hip-Hop Songs (Billboard)	11
US Pop 100 (Billboard)	84
US Rhythmic Airplay (Billboard)	20

=== Year-end charts ===
Year-end chart performance for "Everytime tha Beat Drop"
Chart (2006)	Position
US Hot R&B/Hip Hop Songs (Billboard)	68

== Release history ==
Release dates and formats for "Everytime tha Beat Drop"
Region	Date	Format	Label	Ref.
Various	June 6, 2006	Internet leak	J Records	
Various	July 24, 2006	Digital download	J Records	
United States	September 5, 2006	Mainstream radio	J Records	
