= Lean wit It, Rock wit It =

Single by Dem Franchize Boyz featuring Peanut and Charlay

from the album On Top of Our Game
- Released: December 13, 2005
- Recorded: 2005
- Genre: Snap
- Length: 3:51
- Label: So So Def; EMI America
- Songwriters: Carlos A. Valente; Jamall Willingham; Gerald Tiller; Bernard Leverette; Maurice Gleaton; D'Angelo Hunt; Charles Hammond; Robert Hill
- Producers: Classic Buck$ a.k.a. Buck; Maurice "Parlae" Gleaton

Dem Franchize Boyz singles chronology
"I Think They Like Me" (2005)	"Lean wit It, Rock wit It" (2005)	"Ridin' Rims" (2006)

"Lean wit It, Rock wit It" is a song by the hip-hop group Dem Franchize Boyz from their album On Top of Our Game. The recording features Peanut and Charlay and was produced by Classic Buck$ a.k.a. Buck and Maurice "Parlae" Gleaton.

The song peaked at number seven on the Billboard Hot 100 and number one on the Hot Rap Tracks chart. Classic Buck$ a.k.a. Buck and Maurice "Parlae" Gleaton produced the recording. The music video shows them snap dancing. The song is considered to be the turning point in Dem Franchize Boyz's career as it brought them into mainstream hip hop scene and also wide spread the subgenre of snap music during the mid-2000s. Vocals and lyrics from the bridge of the song were sampled in the Twenty One Pilots song "Holding On to You", "Do It to It" by R&B girl group Cherish, "Everytime tha Beat Drop" by R&B singer Monica, as well as rapper Juice Wrld's "Lean wit Me".

== Remixes ==
Korn and Dem Franchize Boyz did a mashup of their respective hit singles at the time, "Coming Undone" and "Lean wit It, Rock wit It", titled "Coming Undone wit It". The mashup was produced by Jermaine Dupri and Scott Spock from the Matrix, and was first released on AOL in April 2006. The mashup has new parts by both groups exclusively for the song. A video for "Coming Undone wit It" was released on the DVD portion of Korn's Chopped, Screwed, Live and Unglued. This is the official remix to "Coming Undone" and "Lean wit It, Rock wit It".

== Charts ==
=== Weekly charts ===
Chart (2006)	Peak position
Australia (ARIA)	52
US Billboard Hot 100	7
US Hot R&B/Hip-Hop Songs (Billboard)	2
US Hot Rap Songs (Billboard)	1
US Pop Airplay (Billboard)	26
US Pop 100 (Billboard)	21
US Rhythmic Airplay (Billboard)	1

=== Year-end charts ===
Chart (2006)	Position
US Billboard Hot 100	25
US Hot R&B/Hip-Hop Songs (Billboard)	6
US Rhythmic (Billboard)	10

== Release history ==
Region	Date	Format(s)	Label(s)	Ref.
United States	December 20, 2005	Rhythmic contemporary radio	So So Def; Virgin	
