= Johntá Austin =

American singer-songwriter (born 1980)

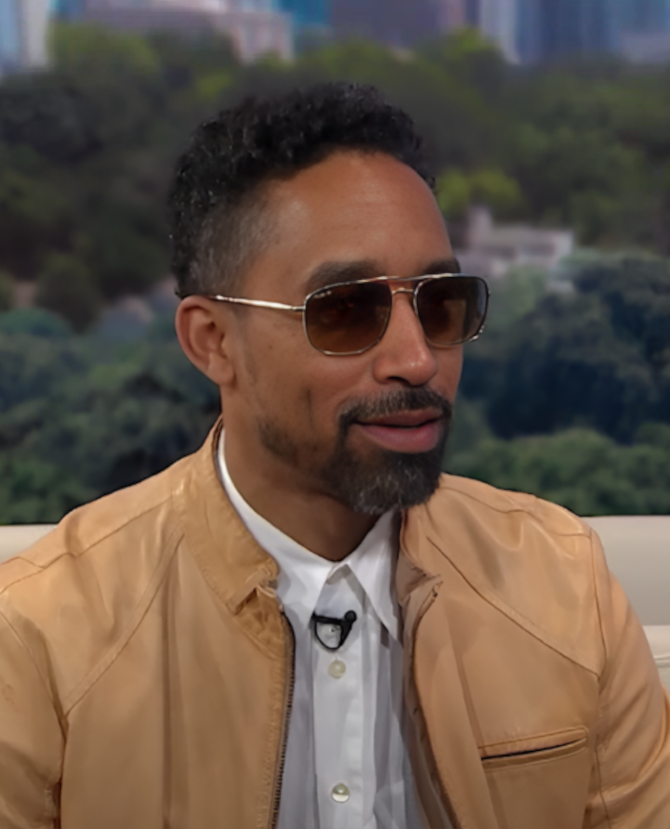
- Austin in 2019

Background information
- Born: Johntá Marice Austin; June 28, 1980 (age 46); Atlanta, Georgia, U.S.
- Genre: R&B
- Occupations: Singer-songwriter; record producer
- Years active: 1995–present
- Labels: So So Def; Island Urban Music; Island; Def Jam
- Formerly of: Ocean's 7; the Characters
- Website: johntaaustin.com

Johntá Moore Austin (/dʒɒnˈteɪ/ jon-TAY; born June 28, 1980) is an American singer-songwriter. He is best known for his production and songwriting work on hometown native Jermaine Dupri's record label, So So Def Recordings during the mid-2000s.

As a recording artist, Austin signed with the label prior to his guest appearance on Dupri's 2005 single "Gotta Getcha", which entered the Billboard Hot 100. The following year, his guest performance alongside Chris Brown on labelmate Bow Wow's 2006 single "Shortie Like Mine" peaked within the top ten of the chart; the following year, his appearance alongside T-Pain on Bow Wow's single, "Outta My System" peaked within its top 40. As a lead artist, Austin released several singles—including "Turn It Up" in 2005—in promotion for his debut studio album Ocean Drive, which was never released.

Austin's songwriting credits often accompanies Dupri's productions, though he also collaborates frequently with producer Bryan-Michael Cox and the duo StarGate. He won two Grammy Awards for his work on the songs "We Belong Together" by Mariah Carey and "Be Without You" by Mary J. Blige.

== Early life and career ==
Austin grew up in Atlanta. In 1989 at the age of 8, Austin hosted the daily television show, Kid's Beat on TBS. Covering current events, sports and the entertainment world, Austin went on to become the Atlanta Bureau Chief for the CNN weekly news program, Real News for Kids and the reporter for the TBS half-hour weekly, Feed Your Mind. As a child actor, he appeared in a 1994 episode of In the Heat of the Night. Austin is also related to Dreamville Records signee J.i.D.

Austin grew up singing in church choirs and wanted to become an actor. He interviewed celebrities including Michael Jackson and Michael Jordan, among others, and in 1993 he made his television debut on The Arsenio Hall Show. On the show he said he loved singing and was asked to sing with Arsenio Hall's band.

== Songwriting ==
=== 1996–2004 ===
Austin's first professional credit as a songwriter was the 1996 single "Can't Be Wasting My Time" for singer Mona Lisa.

Austin was signed in the mid-late 1990s to RCA Records before being dropped in favor of R&B singer Tyrese Gibson. However, he ended up writing a few songs for him (including the hit "Sweet Lady") as well as writing for other artists.

In 1998, Austin co-wrote the single "Miss You", which was originally intended for release on Aaliyah's self-titled third studio album (2001). However, following the singer’s untimely death in August of 2001, the track was ultimately included on the posthumously released compilation album, I Care 4 U (2002) alongside other Austin-penned songs "All I Need", "Come Over", and "Don't Worry". Austin co-wrote "Just Be a Man About It" for The Heat, the third studio album for Toni Braxton.

=== 2005–2009 ===
Austin co-wrote Mariah Carey's hit 2005 singles, "We Belong Together", "Don't Forget About Us", "It's Like That", and "Shake It Off" from her album The Emancipation of Mimi.

"We Belong Together" stayed at number one for fourteen non-consecutive weeks, becoming the second longest-running number one song in US chart history at the time, behind Carey's 1996 collaboration with Boyz II Men on "One Sweet Day" (both songs have since been surpassed by Lil Nas X and Billy Ray Cyrus' 2019 hit single "Old Town Road", which spent 19 weeks in the number one position at its peak). "We Belong Together" won Grammys for Best Female R&B Vocal Performance and Best R&B Song.

In that same year, Austin also co-wrote Mary J. Blige's single "Be Without You" from her No. 1 selling CD The Breakthrough and Monica's single "Everytime Tha Beat Drop" from her album The Makings of Me. He is also featured as a guest artist on Jermaine Dupri's 2005 song, "Gotta Getcha" and is credited as co-writer on several songs on Chris Brown's self-titled debut album in 2005, such as "Yo (Excuse Me Miss)" and "Poppin'". He also co-wrote "With You" for Chris Brown and "Can I Call You" from Marques Houston's debut album MH in 2003.

Austin produced and was featured on the songs "Shortie Like Mine" and "Outta My System", both singles by rapper Bow Wow off his album The Price of Fame. Both of the songs were successful, "Shortie Like Mine" reaching number nine, and "Outta My System" reaching number 14 on the Billboard Hot 100.

Austin co-wrote "Still" by Canadian singer Tamia, found on her 2004 release, More, "This Song" by LeToya Luckett, found on her 2006 debut, LeToya, He also co-wrote "My Heart" on Jennifer Hudson's self-titled debut album Jennifer Hudson (2008).

In 2007, Austin co-wrote "Can't Help but Wait" by Trey Songz for his second studio album, Trey Day. The song was nominated for Best Male R&B Vocal Performance at the 51st Annual Grammy Awards. Austin continuing his work with Trey Songz in 2009 and would go on to executive produce and write on his next album Ready. Austin wrote "One Love" with his musical partner Bryan Michael-Cox. Austin also co-wrote "I Need A Girl" which saw radio success reaching No. 6 on the US Hot R&B/Hip-Hop Song chart.

=== 2010–present ===
In 2010, Austin co-wrote the song "Foolin Around" with Jermaine Dupri and Bryan Michael-Cox for Usher's Grammy award-winning album Raymond v. Raymond. Also, he co-wrote the song "Never Let You Go" for Justin Bieber's debut album My World 2.0. He executive produced and sang background vocal on Passion, Pain & Pleasure, the fourth studio album of Trey Songz.

On June 25, 2010, in Los Angeles, California, at the ASCAP 23rd annual Rhythm & Soul music awards, Austin received the prestigious “Song of the Decade” award for his work on "We Belong Together" by Mariah Carey, alongside fellow producer Jermaine Dupri and songwriter Manuel Seal. He is currently a recurring character on the Fox show Star (2016) alongside hip hop legend Queen Latifah.

== Solo career ==
After achieving success writing for other artists, Austin began work on his full-length debut album Ocean Drive on So So Def/Virgin Records. His first single "Lil' More Love" was released on June 7, 2005. It was followed by the release of "Dope Fiend" on November 29 later that year. While the album's first two singles failed to achieve radio/chart success, the label released a third single "Turn It Up" on July 11, 2006 along with a Jadakiss-added version in November.

A fourth single, "Video" featuring Unk was released a year later on July 31, 2007. Following the departure of So So Def Recordings from Virgin Records for Island Def Jam in 2007, the album was pushed back from a February 6, 2007, release to a September 4 release. A final single, the ballad "The One That Got Away" was released in 2008, before the album was eventually shelved.

In 2010, Austin released a digital single "Close Your Eyes".

In 2012, Austin announced the upcoming release of the "Love" EP, part 1 of a three-part release with the subsequent "Sex" and "Religion" EPs to follow. "Love" EP was released on December 12 preceded by the buzz single "What a Feeling" featuring Jermaine Dupri.

== Discography ==
=== Studio albums ===
- 2008: Ocean Drive (Shelved)
- 2019: Love, Sex, & Religion

=== EPs ===
- 2012: Love

=== Singles ===
Year	Single	Peak charts		Album
Year	Single	US	US R&B	Album
2005	"Lil' More Love"	—	—	Ocean Drive (Shelved)
2005	"Dope Fiend"	—	—	Ocean Drive (Shelved)
2006	"Turn It Up" (featuring Jermaine Dupri)	—	48	Ocean Drive (Shelved)
2007	"Video" (featuring DJ Unk)	—	—	Ocean Drive (Shelved)
2008	"The One That Got Away"	—	94	Ocean Drive (Shelved)
2011	"Close Your Eyes"	—	—	Love, Sex, & Religion

=== Featured singles ===
Year	Single	Artist	Chart positions			Album
Year	Single	Artist	US	US R&B	US Rap	Album
2005	"Gotta Getcha"	Jermaine Dupri	60	31	15	Young, Fly & Flashy, Vol. 1
2006	"Shortie Like Mine"	Bow Wow (also feat. Chris Brown)	9	9	1	The Price of Fame
2006	"Outta My System"	Bow Wow (also feat. T-Pain)	22	12	2	The Price of Fame
2009	"You Can Get It All"	Bow Wow	55	30	9	New Jack City II
2010	"Shawty Wus Up"	Dondria (also feat. Diamond)	—	66	—	Dondria vs. Phatfffat
2022	"Better Days"	JID	–	–	–	The Forever Story
