= Dem Franchize Boyz =

American hip-hop group

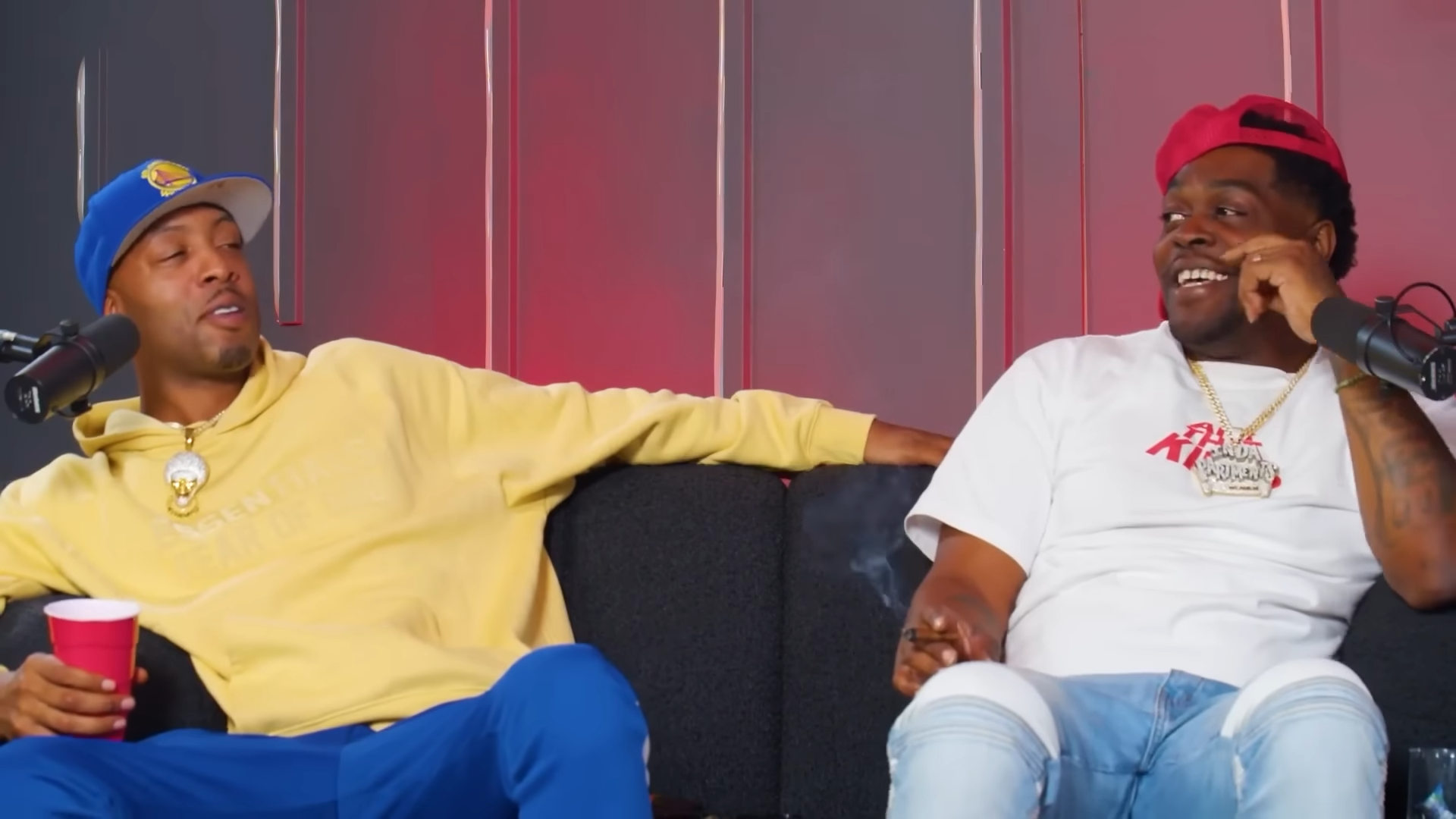
- Pimpin' (left) and Parlae (right) of Dem Franchize Boyz in 2023

Background information
- Also known as: DFB
- Origin: Bankhead, Atlanta, Georgia, U.S.
- Genre: Southern hip-hop
- Years active: 2002–2012
- Labels: Universal; So So Def; Virgin America; Capitol; E1; Wash House
- Past members: Parlae; Buddie (deceased); Pimpin'; Jizzal Man

Dem Franchize Boyz was an American hip-hop group from Atlanta, signed to E1 Music. The group had four members: Parlae (born Maurice Gleaton), Pimpin' (Jamal Willingham), Jizzal Man (Bernard Leverette), and Buddie (Gerald Tiller). They were best known for their hit singles "I Think They Like Me", "Lean wit It, Rock wit It", and "White Tee".

== History ==
The origin of the group dates back to when all four members were high school and college schoolmates, making music for fun while furthering their education. In regards to the group name, Parlae stated that "We are a franchise, a business. We're homeboys, but we're business partners too. We all do different things and have different roles. That's how we got the name." One day while pursuing their business degrees in North Carolina, the four recorded a song in a dorm room that would become their future debut and hit single "White Tee", before moving back to Atlanta.

The group signed to Universal Records in 2004 after performing unsigned. Universal released the group's self-titled debut album in September of that year with the hit single "White Tee", which BET featured for some time. In 2005, record producer Jermaine Dupri signed Dem Franchize Boyz to his label So So Def after transferring it from Arista Records to Virgin Records. Dem Franchize Boyz' remix of their earlier track "Oh I Think They Like Me" was retitled simply "I Think They Like Me" and featured Dupri, Bow Wow, and Da Brat and topped the Billboard R&B chart. In regards to the contract signing, Parlae stated:

We knew JD--we met JD through... a car show in Dallas. You know... we had a song "White Tee"? When JD got on the "White Tee" remix it got real popular, so we ended up doing a show with him...in Dallas at the car show there. That was our first time meeting JD, and it was like, it was real responsive, real crazy, so JD was like, "I wanna do something else wit y'all." So we had a song "Oh I Think Dey Like Me," [and] JD said let's do an official remix, put it on his Young, Fly & Flashy album, and then a song turned into a contract.

So So Def released On Top of Our Game in 2006, and the single "Lean wit It, Rock wit It" followed. "Lean wit It" was among several "snap music" singles popular in early 2006, such as "Laffy Taffy" by D4L and "Play" by David Banner.

Parlae (Maurice Gleaton) was arrested on June 13, 2006, after police raided a studio and found drugs, weapons, and money. All charges were later dropped. He was also arrested as the prime suspect in the murder of Kenneth Kemp that same year. The case was dismissed on a technicality. Another member, Pimpin' (Jamall Willingham), was also arrested for a DUI in October 2007.

Dem Franchize Boyz collaborated with Korn to produce a mash-up of "Lean wit It, Rock wit It" and "Coming Undone" called "Coming Undone wit It". They are also featured in Monica's single "Everytime tha Beat Drop". They released their third album, Our World, Our Way, on Koch Records on September 30, 2008.

Gerald "Buddie" Tiller (born Gerald Hernandez Tiller on October 26, 1982) died of cancer on August 25, 2019, at age 36.

== Discography ==
Studio albums

- Dem Franchize Boyz (2004)
- On Top of Our Game (2006)
- Our World, Our Way (2008)

Mixtapes

- Voltron (2011)
