= LRoc =

American songwriter

- Also known as: LRoc
- Born: James Elbert Phillips
- Origin: Monrovia, Liberia
- Genre: Hip hop
- Occupations: Record producer; songwriter
- Years active: 1995–present

James Elbert Phillips, known professionally as LRoc, is an American record producer who has served as in-house talent for Jermaine Dupri's So So Def Recordings since 1997. His credits include the singles "Call on Me" by Janet Jackson, "Everytime Tha Beat Drop" by Monica, "Get Your Number" by Mariah Carey, "Yeah!" by Usher, "Grillz" by Nelly, and "Sponsor" by Teairra Marí.
