= Snap music =

Hip hop music subgenre

- Other names: Snap; snap rap; ringtone rap
- Stylistic origins: Crunk; Southern hip-hop
- Cultural origins: Early 2000s, Bankhead, Atlanta, United States
- Typical instruments: Drum machine (TR-808); finger snapping; sampler; synthesizer; keyboards; vocals
- Derivative forms: Trap

Snap music (also known as snap, ringtone rap or snap rap) is a subgenre of hip hop music derived from crunk that originated in southern United States in the 2000s, in Bankhead, West Atlanta, United States. It achieved mainstream popularity throughout the mid-late 2000s, but declined shortly thereafter. Popular snap artists include D4L, Ramage, Dem Franchize Boyz and K-Rab.

Tracks commonly consist of an 808 bass drum, hi-hat, bass, snapping, a main groove and a vocal track. Snap songs may also incorporate whistling. Hit snap songs include "Lean wit It, Rock wit It" by Dem Franchize Boyz, "Snap Yo Fingers" by Lil Jon, "Laffy Taffy" by D4L, "Ya Lil (Al Anisa Farah)" by Ramage, "It's Goin' Down" by Yung Joc and "Crank That (Soulja Boy)" by Soulja Boy Tell 'Em, and "Look at Her" by One Chance.

Crunk has been called the "predecessor of snap". Hip Hop DX magazine described snap music as a "laid back version of its forbearer [sic], crunk music".

== History ==
It is suggested that snap music appeared around 2000 in a crime-infested neighborhood of Bankhead, Atlanta, Georgia. Bankhead was a place where the difference between poor and rich was striking, and, as it has been described, "a lighter sound" of snap was born "in the midst of all the aggression." Very soon after its creation, snap music took on another type of music of Atlanta - crunk. In 2005, Dem Franchize Boys, who had already produced some snap hits for local clubs by the time, got signed to Universal Music Group. It has been said that weak promotion and the decision of Universal Music to put out the debut album of Dem Franchize Boys and Nelly's "Sweat and Suit" the same day were reasons why their first album wasn't a success. In 2005, they got the attention of Jermaine Dupri, who remixed their single "I Think They Like Me" and signed them to So So Def. The remix of "I Think They Like Me" topped the Hot Rap/R&B songs chart and reached #15 on the Billboard Hot 100. Jermaine Dupri was later described as the key figure in bringing snap music into the mainstream.

Another Atlanta based group, D4L, were performing at Atlanta's Vision Nightclub and Lounge alongside 8Ball, Keyshia Cole and Slim Thug at the time. In 2005, they produced "Laffy Taffy", which occupied the number one position on the Billboard Hot 100 chart. Their debut album, Down for Life, was certified gold by RIAA. D4L and Dem Franchize Boys started a rivalry over who started snap. As Fabo of D4L mentioned, Dem Franchize Boys were looked down upon by members of the community, and were referred to as "label prostitutes" there. However, The New York Times stated that lyric-oriented producers like T.I. and Young Jeezy get way more respect in Atlanta, than acts like D4L, where snap music is seen as light club music as opposed to "heavy street" music of ones like T.I.

As this rivalry continued, the resident DJ of Atlanta's Pool Palace, DJ T-Roc claimed that K-Rab was making snap long before Dem Franchize Boys and D4L. There are other facts telling that K-Rab could be the original creator of snap - he produced "Laffy Taffy" and his voice can be heard on the early snap hits, like "Do the Pool Palace" and "Bubble Gum".

Snap music rise to mainstream popularity in 2005 and 2006. On January 12, 2006, The New York Times reviewed "Laffy Taffy". While analyzing the song's structure, the author noted that "On the hip-hop prestige scale, goofy dance songs like 'Laffy Taffy' don't rate very high." The review also touched the broader topic of snap music with a conclusion, that it's hardly possible that major record label catches on this sound, as they, in the opinion of the author, needed something "more serious" than snap. It was also noted that snap does very well with the digital download system, as "cheap" snap and cheap cost of digital tracks (99 cents for "Laffy Taffy") fit well. There was another hit with the popping sound in the place of the snare drum that reached the number 3 position on the Billboard Hot 100 in 2006, Yung Joc's "It's Goin' Down". Billboard magazine claimed that the popping sounds of "It's Going Down", however, weren't fingersnapping. Crunk producer Lil Jon also increased exposure of the snap genre to the mainstream by releasing his single "Snap Yo Fingers", which peaked at number 7 on the Billboard Hot 100.

Snap continued to maintain a strong presence on the mainstream Billboard charts in 2007. In late 2007, then 17-year-old American rapper Soulja Boy released his hit "Crank That", which enjoyed the number one position on the Billboard Hot 100 for 7 weeks, and was nominated for a Grammy and became one of the biggest hits of the year, advancing the influence of snap music on the Billboard charts, as well as furthering delving into the crunk genre. During the same year, a number of websites specializing in crunk mixtapes opened, increasing exposure to the genre. R&B singer T-Pain's snap song "Buy U a Drank (Shawty Snappin')" ranks #63 on Rolling Stone's list of the 100 Best Songs of 2007. It was also a number-one on the Hot 100 and was number 68 in Rolling Stone's "Best Songs of 2007" list. In February 2008, Atlanta rapper V.I.C. released his hit snap single "Get Silly" which peaked at #29 on the Billboard Hot 100 and garnered single sales of 500,000 copies sold.

=== Snap&B ===
In 2006, Vibe magazine mentioned the subgenre of snap, "snap&B" in connection to the Cherish album Unappreciated. Vibe stated a concern whether snap&B could take on crunk&B, which was too popular at the time. Vibe also pointed to one characteristic trait of snap&B, saying that, unlike slow jams which may feature snapping, a track should be "pop" as well to be called "snap&B".

== See also ==
- Crunk
- Trap music
- Drill music
- Bounce music
- Gangsta rap
- G-funk
