= Vanessa Williams discography =

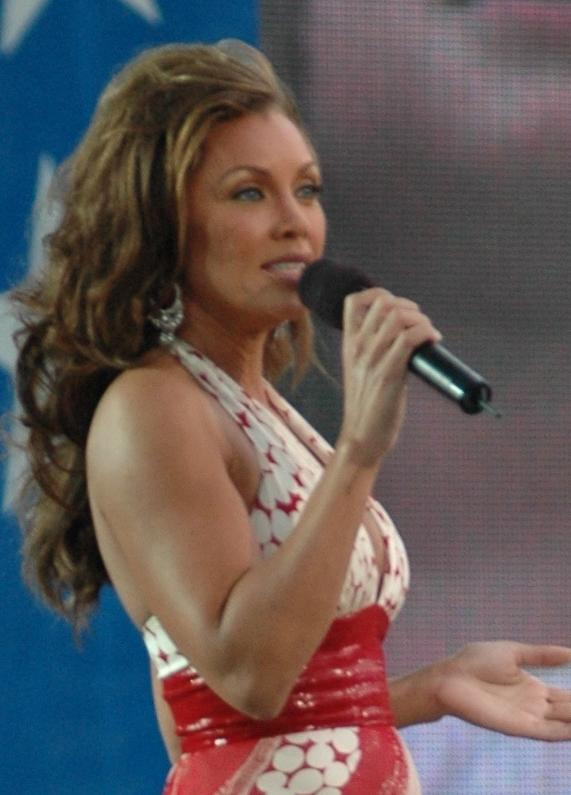
- Vanessa Williams on July 4, 2006
- Studio albums: 9
- Live albums: 1
- Compilation albums: 4
- Singles: 31
- Music videos: 23
- Other appearances: 2

Vanessa Williams (born March 18, 1963) is an American actress and singer. In 1987, Williams released her debut album, The Right Stuff. The first single, "The Right Stuff", found success on the R&B chart, while the second single, "He's Got the Look", found similar success on the same chart. The third single, "Dreamin'", was a pop hit, becoming Williams's first top 10 hit on the Billboard Hot 100, peaking at No. 8, and her first number one single on the Hot R&B/Hip-Hop Songs chart. The album reached gold status in the US and earned her an NAACP Image Award and three Grammy Award nominations, including one for Best New Artist.

Her second album The Comfort Zone became the biggest success in her music career. The lead single "Running Back to You" reached top twenty on the Hot 100, and the top position of Hot R&B/Hip-Hop Songs chart on October 5, 1991. Other singles included "The Comfort Zone" (#2 R&B), "Just for Tonight" (#26 Pop), a cover of The Isley Brothers' "Work to Do" (#3 R&B), and the club-only hit "Freedom Dance (Get Free!)". The most successful single from the album, as well as her biggest hit to date, is "Save the Best for Last". It reached No. 1 in the United States, where it remained for five weeks, as well as No. 1 in Australia, the Netherlands, and Canada, and was in the top 5 in Japan, Ireland and the United Kingdom. The album sold 2.2 million copies in the US at its time of release and has since been certified triple platinum in the United States by the RIAA, gold in Canada by the CRIA, and platinum in the United Kingdom by the BPI. The Comfort Zone earned Williams five Grammy Award nominations.

The Sweetest Days, her third album, was released in 1994 to highly-favorable reviews. The album saw Williams branch out and sample other styles of music that included jazz, hip hop, rock, and Latin-themed recordings such as "Betcha Never" and "You Can't Run", both written and produced by Babyface. Other singles from the album included the adult-contemporary and dance hit "The Way That You Love" and the title track "The Sweetest Days". The album was certified platinum in the US by the RIAA and earned her two Grammy Award nominations.

Other releases include two Christmas albums, Star Bright, released in 1996, and Silver & Gold in 2004; Next in 1997, and Everlasting Love in 2005, along with a greatest-hits compilation released in 1998, and a host of other compilations released over the years. Notable chart performances from subsequent albums, motion picture and television soundtracks have included the songs "Love Is", which was a duet with Brian McKnight, the Golden Globe- and Academy Award-winning "Colors of the Wind", "Where Do We Go from Here?", and "Oh How the Years Go By".

On June 2, 2009, she released her eighth studio album on Concord Records titled The Real Thing. It features songs written and/or produced by Babyface, Stevie Wonder, Bill Withers, Bebel Gilberto, and Rex Rideout. Williams described the album as "a hybrid of samba, bossa nova, some salsa and also some pop and R&B". The title song "The Real Thing", the fourth single released from the album, peaked at No. 6 on the Billboard Hot Dance Club Songs chart.

She received a number of Grammy nominations for her work in the music industry, including hits such as "The Right Stuff", "Save the Best for Last", "Colors of the Wind", and "Oh How the Years Go By".

== Albums ==
=== Studio albums ===
Year	Album details	Peak chart positions							Sales	Certifications
Year	Album details	US	US R&B	AUS	CAN	GER	NLD	UK	Sales	Certifications
1988	The Right Stuff: Release date: February 2, 1988; Label: Wing, Mercury	38	18	—	—	—	45	—		RIAA: Gold
1991	The Comfort Zone: Release date: August 20, 1991; Label: Wing, Mercury	17	1	29	24	52	28	24		RIAA: 3× Platinum; MC: Gold
1994	The Sweetest Days: Release date: December 6, 1994; Label: Wing, Mercury	57	25	72	—	74	—	—		RIAA: Platinum
1996	Star Bright: Release date: November 5, 1996; Label: Mercury	36	24	—	—	—	—	—		RIAA: Gold
1997	Next: Release date: August 26, 1997; Label: Mercury	53	28	—	—	—	—	—	US: 220,000	
2004	Silver & Gold ^{[A]}: Release date: October 12, 2004; Label: Lava, Atlantic	120	46	—	—	—	—	—	US: 100,000	
2005	Everlasting Love: Release date: January 25, 2005; Label: Lava, Atlantic	159	57	—	—	—	—	—	US: 60,000	
2009	The Real Thing ^{[B]}: Release date: June 2, 2009; Label: Concord	91	36	—	—	—	—	—	US: 62,000	
2024	Survivor: Release date: August 23, 2024; Label: Mellian Music, WMG	—	—	—	—	—	—	—		
"—" denotes a recording that did not chart or was not released in that territory.

- ^{A} Peaked at No. 2 on the Billboard Gospel Albums chart and at No. 6 on the ARIA R&B Albums chart.
- ^{B} Peaked at No. 1 on the Billboard Top Contemporary Jazz Albums chart and at No. 2 on the Billboard Top Jazz Albums chart.

=== Live albums ===
Year	Album details	Peak chart positions		
Year	Album details	US	AUT	GER
2001	Our Favorite Things (with Tony Bennett, Charlotte Church, & Plácido Domingo) ^{[C]}: First live album; Release date: October 16, 2001; Label: Sony Classical	102	48	79

- ^{C} Peaked at No. 2 on the Billboard Top Classical Crossover chart and at No. 25 on the Billboard Top Internet Albums chart.

=== Compilation albums ===
Year	Album details
1998	Greatest Hits: The First Ten Years: First compilation album; Released: November 17, 1998; Label: Mercury
2003	20th Century Masters - The Millennium Collection: The Best of Vanessa Williams: Second compilation album; Released: September 23, 2003; Label: Mercury
2004	Love Songs: Third compilation album; Released: January 13, 2004; Label: Mercury
2021	The Best: Fourth compilation album; Released: May 14, 2021; Label: Mercury

== Singles ==
Year	Single	Peak chart positions										Certifications	Album
Year	Single	US	US Dan	US A/C	AUS	CAN	GER	IRE	NLD	NZ	UK	Certifications	Album
1988	"The Right Stuff" ^{[F]}	44	1	—	—	—	—	—	21	—	71		The Right Stuff
1988	"(He's Got) The Look"	—	—	—	—	—	—	—	—	—	—		The Right Stuff
1988	"Dreamin'"	8	—	2	108	16	—	—	40	19	74		The Right Stuff
1989	"Darlin' I"	88	—	10	—	—	—	—	—	—	—		The Right Stuff
1991	"Running Back to You"	18	2	—	102	86	—	—	—	—	82		The Comfort Zone
1991	"The Comfort Zone"	62	25	—	—	—	—	—	—	—	—		The Comfort Zone
1992	"Save the Best for Last"	1	—	1	1	1	19	2	4	15	3	RIAA: Gold; BPI: Silver; ARIA: Platinum; RMNZ: Gold	The Comfort Zone
1992	"Just for Tonight"	26	—	2	—	10	—	—	46	45	83		The Comfort Zone
1992	"Work to Do"	52	8	—	—	—	—	—	—	—	—		The Comfort Zone
1993	"Love Is" (with Brian McKnight)	3	—	1	49	3	—	—	—	—	92		Beverly Hills 90210: The Soundtrack
1994	"The Sweetest Days"	18	—	3	47	6	—	—	—	—	41		The Sweetest Days
1995	"The Way That You Love"	67	6	—	—	39	—	—	—	—	52		The Sweetest Days
1995	"Colors of the Wind"	4	—	2	16	11	—	16	8	25	21	RIAA: Gold	Pocahontas: An Original Walt Disney Records Soundtrack
1995	"You Can't Run"	—	—	—	—	—	—	—	—	—	—		The Sweetest Days
1996	"Where Do We Go from Here?"	71	—	5	—	29	87	—	—	—	—		Greatest Hits: The First Ten Years
1996	"Do You Hear What I Hear?"	—	—	15	—	—	—	—	—	—	—		Star Bright
1997	"Happiness"	—	—	—	—	70	—	—	—	49	—		Next
1997	"First Thing on Your Mind"	—	—	—	—	—	—	—	—	—	—		Next
1997	"Oh How the Years Go By"	—	—	6	—	—	—	—	—	—	—		Next
1998	"Who Were You Thinkin' 'Bout?"	—	—	—	—	—	—	—	—	—	—		Next
1998	"Refugio de Amor (You Are My Home)" (with Chayanne) ^{[G]}	—	—	—	—	—	—	—	—	—	—		Dance with Me: Music from the Motion Picture
2004	"Silver and Gold"	—	—	4	—	—	—	—	—	—	—		Silver & Gold
2004	"Merry Christmas Darling"	—	—	18	—	—	—	—	—	—	—		Silver & Gold
2005	"You Are Everything"	—	5	16	—	—	—	—	—	—	—		Everlasting Love
2009	"Breathless"	—	—	—	—	—	—	—	—	—	—		The Real Thing
2009	"Just Friends" ^{[H]}	—	—	—	—	—	—	—	—	—	—		The Real Thing
2009	"Close to You"	—	—	—	—	—	—	—	—	—	—		The Real Thing
2009	"The Real Thing"	—	6	—	—	—	—	—	—	—	—		The Real Thing
2024	"Legs (Keep Dancing)"	—	3^{[I]}	—	—	—	—	—	—	—	(Note: "Legs (Keep Dancing)" did not enter the UK Singles Chart but peaked at number 76 on the UK Singles Downloads Chart.)		Survivor
2024	"Bop!" (with Trixie Mattel and Lion Babe)	—	—	—	—	—	—	—	—	—	—		Survivor
2024	"iLike Moonlight"	—	—	—	—	—	—	—	—	—	—		Survivor
2024	"Survivor"	—	—	—	—	—	—	—	—	—	—		Survivor
2024	"—" denotes a recording that did not chart or was not released in that territory.												

- ^{F} A 1989 remix of the song charted at number 62 in the UK.
- ^{G} Peaked at No. 3 on the Billboard Hot Latin Tracks chart and at No. 5 on the Billboard Tropical/Salsa Songs chart.
- ^{H} Peaked at No. 10 on the Billboard Smooth Jazz Songs chart.
- ^{I} Peaked at No. 3 on the Dance/Electronic Digital Songs Sales chart. The Dance Club Songs chart is no longer published.
    - The title track ”survivor” has been used as a promotional single for the album, including a lyrics video release.

=== Featured singles ===
Year	Single	Artist	Peak positions		Album
Year	Single	Artist	US	US R&B	Album
1995	"Freedom (Theme from Panther)"	Various artists	45	18	Panther
2020	Twerking 5 to 9: The Rusical	As part of the Cast of RuPaul's Secret Celebrity Drag Race featuring Christina Bianco & April Malina	-	-	non-album single

== Other appearances ==
Year	Song	Album
1994	"Save the Best for Last" (Live)	Grammy's Greatest Moments: Volume II
1994	"You Would Be My Baby"	The Mask: Music from the Motion Picture

== Video releases ==
=== Video albums ===
Year	Title
1989	The Right Stuff: Released: 1989; Label: PolyGram
1992	The Comfort Zone Collection: Released: 1992; Label: Polydor

=== Concert videos ===
Year	Video details	Notes
1996	Vanessa Williams & Friends: Christmas in New York	
1997	Vanessa Williams live in Japan	
1998	Pavarotti & Friends for the Children of Liberia	
2000	Our Favorite Things: Christmas in Vienna	With Tony Bennett and Plácido Domingo
2004	Vanessa Williams Christmas: Live by Request	

=== Music videos ===
Year	Title	Director
1988	"The Right Stuff"	Rebecca Blake
1988	"(He's Got) The Look"	Alek Keshishian
1988	"Dreamin'"	Alek Keshishian
1989	"Darlin' I"	Alek Keshishian
1991	"Running Back to You"	Ralph Ziman
1991	"The Comfort Zone"	Ralph Ziman
1992	"Save the Best for Last"	Ralph Ziman
1992	"Just for Tonight"	David Cameron
1992	"Work to Do"	Pam Thomas
1992	"What Will I Tell My Heart"	Ralph Ziman
1992	"Save the Best for Last" (Holiday Version)	Kevin Bray
1992	"What Child Is This?"	
1993	"Love Is" (with Brian McKnight)	Ralph Ziman
1994	"The Sweetest Days"	Kevin Bray
1995	"The Way That You Love"	Matthew Rolston
1995	"Freedom (Theme from Panther)" (with Various Artists)	Antoine Fuqua
1995	"Colors of the Wind"	Dominic Orlando
1996	"Where Do We Go from Here?"	Andy Morahan
1997	"Happiness"	Francis Lawrence
1998	"Refugio de Amor (You Are My Home)" (with Chayanne)	Gustavo Garzón
2009	"Breathless"	Mike Ruiz
2009	"Just Friends"	Mike Ruiz
2009	"Close to You"	Mike Ruiz
2024	"Legs (Keep Dancing)"	
2024	"Bop!" (with Lion Babe)	

== See also ==
- List of awards and nominations received by Vanessa L. Williams
