= Greatest Hits: The First Ten Years =

Greatest hits album by Vanessa Williams
- Released: November 17, 1998
- Recorded: 1988–1998
- Genres: Club; R&B
- Length: 58:01
- Label: Mercury
- Producers: Vanessa Williams, Rex Salas, Donald Robinson, Kenni Hairston, Trevor Gale, Gerry Brown, Kipper Jones, Keith Thomas, Babyface, Nick Moroch, Brian McKnight, David Foster, Gary Taylor

Vanessa Williams chronology
Next (1997)	Greatest Hits: The First Ten Years (1998)	20th Century Masters – The Millennium Collection: The Best of Vanessa Williams (2003)

Professional ratings
Review scores
Source	Rating
AllMusic	4.5/5 stars
Robert Christgau	(dud)

Greatest Hits: The First Ten Years is the first greatest hits album (sixth overall) by American singer and actress Vanessa Williams, released in the US on November 17, 1998, on Mercury Records. It features eleven of her previous recordings from the ten years starting from 1988, plus a new recording, a cover of Bobby Caldwell's "My Flame". The album also features her soundtrack contributions "Love Is", "Colors of the Wind" and "Where Do We Go From Here?".

The compilation includes all of Williams' singles to have charted on the Billboard Hot 100 in the US, except for four: "Darlin' I", "Just For Tonight", "Work to Do" and "The Way That You Love".

The only older tracks included on the album that did not chart on the Billboard Hot 100 are "Betcha Never" (from The Sweetest Days) and Williams's covers of Flora Purim's "Open Your Eyes, You Can Fly" and Simon Climie's "Oh How the Years Go By". Both these covers were originally released only on multi-artist compilations (although "Oh How The Years Go By" was subsequently included on Next).

== Chart performance ==
The album failed to chart on the Billboard 200. "My Flame" was released as a single and gained airplay on mostly jazz and adult contemporary radio stations, but failed to chart on the Billboard Hot 100.

== Track listing ==
No.	Title	Writer(s)	Producer(s)	Length
1.	"The Right Stuff (from The Right Stuff)"	Kipper Jones, Rex Salas	Salas	4:18
2.	"Dreamin' (from The Right Stuff)"	Michael Forte, Lisa Montgomery, Geneva Paschal	Donald Robinson	5:25
3.	"Running Back to You (from The Comfort Zone)"	Trevor Gale, Kenni Hairston, John Davis, Craig Snydeder	Gale, Hairston	4:39
4.	"The Comfort Zone (from The Comfort Zone)"	Jones, Reggie Stewart	Gerry Brown, Jones	3:58
5.	"Save the Best for Last (from The Comfort Zone)"	Phil Galdston, Jon Lind, Wendy Waldman	Keith Thomas	3:40
6.	"The Sweetest Days (from The Sweetest Days)"	Galdston, Lind, Waldman	Thomas	3:31
7.	"Betcha Never (from The Sweetest Days)"	Babyface	Babyface	3:55
8.	"Open Your Eyes, You Can Fly (from the compilation Ain't Nuthin' But A She Thing)"	Chick Corea, Neville Potter	Brown, Nick Moroch, Williams	4:57
9.	"Oh How the Years Go By (from the compilation NBA at 50 - A Musical Celebration and the album Next)"	Simon Climie, Will Jennings	Thomas	5:11
10.	"Love Is (with Brian McKnight) (from the soundtrack to Beverly Hills 90210)"	Michael Caruso, Tonio K, John Keller	McKnight, Brown, Williams	4:45
11.	"Colors of the Wind (from the Pocahontas soundtrack)"	Alan Menken, Stephen Schwartz	Thomas	4:18
12.	"Where Do We Go from Here? (featured in the film Eraser but previously unreleased on an album)"	David Foster, Douglas Pashley, Linda Thompson, Evan Kopelson	Foster	4:19
13.	"My Flame (previously unreleased)"	Bobby Caldwell	Gary Taylor	5:05

- Track information and credits verified from the album's liner notes. Some information was adapted from AllMusic.

== Charts ==
Chart (1999)	Peak position
Taiwanese International Albums (IFPI)	2
