= List of awards and nominations received by Vanessa Williams =

Awards and nominations of Vanessa Williams
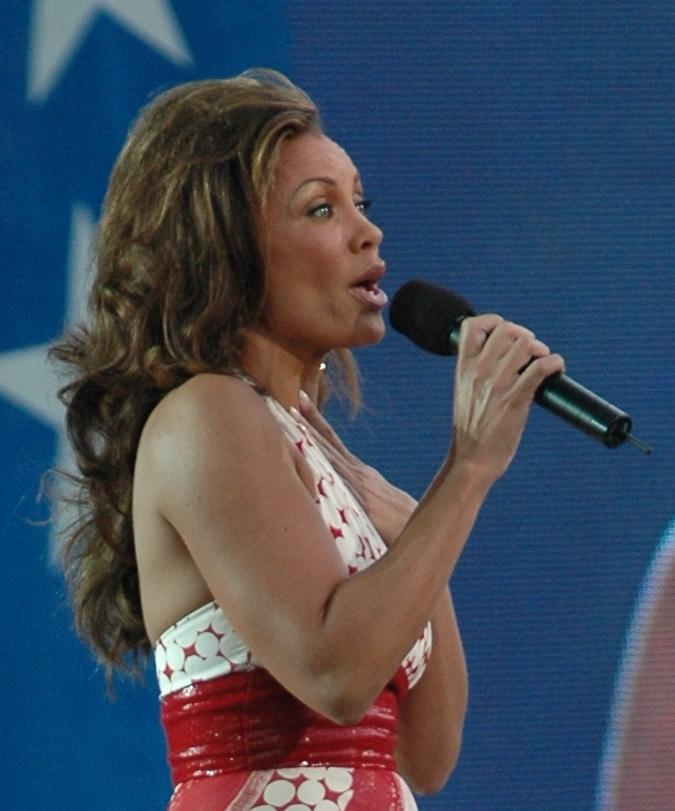
Major Honors & Awards	Wins	Nominations
American Music Awards	0	3
Emmy Awards	0	3
Grammy Awards	0	11
Hollywood Walk of Fame	1	NA
MTV Video Music Awards	0	2
Miss America 1984	1	1
NAACP Image Award	7	8
Satellite Awards	4	2
Screen Actors Guild Awards	0	3
Soul Train Music Award	1	1
Tony Awards	0	1
- Totals
Awards won	27
Nominations	58

Vanessa Williams (born March 18, 1963) is an American actress and singer. In 1983, she became the first African–American woman to win the title of Miss America (Miss America 1984). Williams was forced to resign a few weeks prior to the end of her reign on July 22, 1984 due to a scandal surrounding the publication of unauthorized nude photographs in Penthouse magazine. After her resignation as Miss America in 1984, Williams rebounded with a successful career in the entertainment industry. She is the recipient of a number of awards and nominations including Grammy nominations for hits such as "The Right Stuff," "Save the Best for Last," and "Colors of the Wind." In addition, she has earned multiple Emmy nominations, a Tony Award nomination, 7 NAACP Image Awards, and 4 Satellite Awards.

She received a star on the Hollywood Walk of Fame on March 19, 2007.

== Music ==
=== Grammy Awards ===
Williams has received eleven Grammy nominations without a win.

Year	Category	Track/album	Result
1989	Best New Artist	Vanessa L. Williams	Nominated
1989	Best Female R&B Vocal Performance	"The Right Stuff"	Nominated
1990	Best Female R&B Vocal Performance	"Dreamin'"	Nominated
1992	Best Female R&B Vocal Performance	"Runnin' Back to You"	Nominated
1993	Record of the Year	"Save the Best for Last"	Nominated
1993	Best Female Pop Vocal Performance	"Save the Best for Last"	Nominated
1993	Best Female R&B Vocal Performance	"The Comfort Zone"	Nominated
1994	Best Pop Performance by a Duo or Group with Vocals	"Love Is"	Nominated
1996	Best Female Pop Vocal Performance	"Colors of the Wind"	Nominated
1996	Best Female R&B Vocal Performance	"The Way That You Love"	Nominated
1998	Best Pop/Contemporary Gospel Album	Star Bright	Nominated

- Williams has featured on three albums nominated for the Grammy for Best Musical Show Album, these nominations being credited to the respective producers, engineers and composers and not to the artists.
- "Save the Best for Last" was also nominated for Song of the Year. As this award only goes to the songwriters, Williams was not nominated. The composers were Wendy Waldman, Jon Lind and Phil Galdstone.
- Williams' recording of "You Can't Run" was nominated for the Grammy for Best R&B Song. As this is a songwriters award the nomination went to the song's composer, Babyface.
- "Colors of the Wind" won Best Song Written for Visual Media. As this award only goes to the songwriters, Williams was not nominated. The composers were Alan Menken and Stephen Schwartz.

=== Additional awards and nominations ===
Year	Award body	Category	Awarded for	Result
1989	NAACP Image Award	Outstanding New Artist	"The Right Stuff"	Won
1993	American Music Award	Favorite Female Artist – Pop / Rock	"The Comfort Zone"	Nominated
1993	American Music Award	Favorite Female Artist – Soul / R&B	"The Comfort Zone"	Nominated
1993	American Music Award	Favorite Album – Adult Contemporary	"The Comfort Zone"	Nominated
1993	MTV Video Music Awards	Best Female Video	"Save the Best for Last"	Nominated
1993	MTV Video Music Awards	Best Cinematography	"Runnin' Back to You"	Nominated
1993	Billboard Music Award	No. 1 Adult Contemporary Single	"Love Is"	Won
1993	Playboy Magazine	Best Female R&B Vocalist	"The Comfort Zone"	Won
1994
1994	NAACP Image Award	Outstanding Female Artist	"The Sweetest Days"	Won
1994	Soul Train Music Award	Best R&B Single by Group, Band or Duo	"Love Is"	Nominated
1996	Soul Train Music Award	"Lady of Soul" Award	Career Achievement	Won
1996	NAACP Image Award	Outstanding Female Artist	"Where Do We Go From Here"	Nominated
1996	Lena Horne Award	For Outstanding Artistic Contribution to the Entertainment		Won
1997	NAACP Image Award for Outstanding Album	Outstanding Album	"Next"	Nominated
1999	ALMA Award	Best Song from A Movie	"You Are My Home"	Nominated
2010	41st NAACP Image Awards	Outstanding Jazz Album	The Real Thing	Nominated

- The song "Colors of the Wind", performed by Vanessa Williams at the end of the film Pocahontas, won the Academy Award for Best Original Song. This award goes to the song's composers (Alan Menken and Stephen Schwartz). The song was performed in the film by Judy Kuhn as the singing voice of the title character.

== Pageants and acting ==
=== Miss America 1984 ===
Year	Award body	Category	Awarded for	Result
1983	Miss America Organization	Miss America 1984 Pageant	* Miss America 1984; *Preliminary Talent (Voice), "Happy Days Are Here Again"; *Preliminary Swimsuit	Won

=== Primetime Emmy Awards ===
Year	Category	Nominated work	Result	Ref.
2007	Outstanding Supporting Actress in a Comedy Series	"Ugly Betty"	Nominated	
2008	Outstanding Supporting Actress in a Comedy Series	"Ugly Betty"	Nominated	
2009	Outstanding Supporting Actress in a Comedy Series	"Ugly Betty"	Nominated	

=== Tony Awards ===
Year	Category	Nominated work	Result	Ref.
2002	Best Actress in a Musical	"Into the Woods"	Nominated	

=== Satellite Awards ===
Year	Category	Nominated work	Result	Ref.
2003	Best Actress Miniseries or Television Film	"Keep the Faith, Baby"	Won	
2006	Best Supporting Actress – Series, Miniseries or Television Film	"Ugly Betty"	Nominated	
2007	Best Supporting Actress – Series, Miniseries or Television Film	"Ugly Betty"	Won	
2009	Best Supporting Actress – Series, Miniseries or Television Film	"Ugly Betty"	Nominated	
2010	Mary Pickford Award	—N/a	Won	
2011	Best Supporting Actress – Series, Miniseries or Television Film	"Desperate Housewives"	Won	

=== Screen Actors Guild Awards ===
Year	Category	Nominated work	Result	Ref.
2007	Outstanding Performance by an Ensemble in a Comedy Series	"Ugly Betty"	Nominated	
2008	Outstanding Performance by an Ensemble in a Comedy Series	"Ugly Betty"	Nominated	
2008	Outstanding Performance by a Female Actor in a Comedy Series	"Ugly Betty"	Nominated	

=== Additional awards and nominations ===
Year	Award body	Category	Awarded for	Result
1994	Theatre World Award	Best Debut Performance	"Kiss of the Spider Woman"	Won
1996	Blockbuster Entertainment Award	Favorite Actress – Action	Eraser	Nominated
1997	NAACP Image Award	Outstanding Actress in a Motion Picture	Soul Food	Won
1997	NAACP Image Award	Outstanding Actress in Mini-Series	The Odyssey	Nominated
1997	Online Television Academy Awards	Best Guest Actress – Syndicated Series	Star Trek: Deep Space Nine	Nominated
1997	Black Film Awards	Best Actress – Motion Picture	Soul Food	Nominated
2000	Blockbuster Entertainment Award	Favorite Actress – Action	Shaft	Nominated
2000	NAACP Image Award	Outstanding Supporting Actress in a Motion Picture	Light It Up	Nominated
2001	NAACP Image Award	Outstanding Supporting Actress in a Motion Picture	Shaft	Nominated
2001	Drama League Award	Distinguished Performance	Into the Woods	Nominated
2002	Satellite Awards	Best Actress – Miniseries or Movie	Keep the Faith, Baby	Won
2002	NAACP Image Award	Outstanding Actress in Mini-Series	Keep the Faith, Baby	Nominated
2002	Black Reel Awards	Best Actress	Keep the Faith, Baby	Nominated
2002	Tony Award	Best Performance by a Leading Actress in a Musical	Into the Woods	Nominated
2004	BET Comedy Awards	Outstanding Lead Actress in a Box Office Movie	Johnson Family Vacation	Nominated
2006	Satellite Awards	Best Supporting Actress in a Series	Ugly Betty	Nominated
2007	Screen Actors Guild Awards	Best Performance – Ensemble in a Comedy Series	Ugly Betty	Nominated
2007	NAACP Image Award	Outstanding Supporting Actress in a Comedy Series	Ugly Betty	Won
2007	Emmy Award	Outstanding Supporting Actress in a Comedy Series	Ugly Betty	Nominated
2007	Teen Choice Awards	Choice TV Villain	Ugly Betty	Won
2007	Hollywood Walk of Fame	Recording	Career Achievement	Won
2008	Human Rights Campaign	"Ally for Equality" Award	Humanitarian Work	Won
2008	Jacobi Children's Arts Award	"Humanitarian/Charitable"	Humanitarian Work	Won
2008	Satellite Awards	Best Supporting Actress in a Series	Ugly Betty	Won
2008	Screen Actors Guild Awards	Best Performance – Ensemble in a Comedy Series	Ugly Betty	Nominated
2008	Screen Actors Guild Awards	Best Performance – Lead Actress in a Comedy Series	Ugly Betty	Nominated
2008	NAACP Image Award	Outstanding Supporting Actress in a Comedy Series	Ugly Betty	Won
2008	Teen Choice Awards	Choice TV Villain	Ugly Betty	Nominated
2008	Emmy Award	Outstanding Supporting Actress in a Comedy Series	Ugly Betty	Nominated
2009	NAACP Image Award	Outstanding Supporting Actress in a Comedy Series	Ugly Betty	Nominated
2009	Daytime Emmy Award	Outstanding Performer in an Animated Program	Mama Mirabelle's Home Movies	Nominated
2009	Emmy Award	Outstanding Supporting Actress in a Comedy Series	Ugly Betty	Nominated
2009	Satellite Awards	Best Supporting Actress in a Series	Ugly Betty	Nominated
2010	NAACP Image Award	Outstanding Supporting Actress in a Comedy Series	Ugly Betty	Nominated
2010	NAACP Image Award	Outstanding Jazz Album	The Real Thing	Nominated
2010	Mary Pickford Award	For Outstanding Artistic Contribution to the Entertainment Industry		Won
2011	NAACP Image Award	Outstanding Actress in a Comedy Series	Desperate Housewives	Won
2011	Satellite Awards	Best Supporting Actress in a TV Series, Mini Series or TV Movie	Desperate Housewives	Won
2012	NAACP Image Award	Outstanding Actress in a Comedy Series	Desperate Housewives	Nominated
2012	Ride of Fame	N/A	Life's Work	Won
2013	NAACP Image Award	Outstanding Supporting Actress in a Comedy Series	Desperate Housewives	Won
2013	Drama League Award	Distinguished Performance	The Trip to Bountiful	Nominated
2014	NAACP Image Award	Outstanding Supporting Actress in a Drama Series	666 Park Avenue	Nominated
2015	NAACP Image Award	Outstanding Actress in a Television Movie, Mini-Series or Dramatic Special	The Trip To Bountiful (2014 TV movie based on the 2013 Broadway Revival)	Nominated

Awards and achievements
Preceded by Debra Maffett	Miss America; 1984	Succeeded by Suzette Charles
Preceded by Eileen Clark	Miss New York; 1983	Succeeded by Melissa Manning
