= Alek Keshishian =

American film director and screenwriter

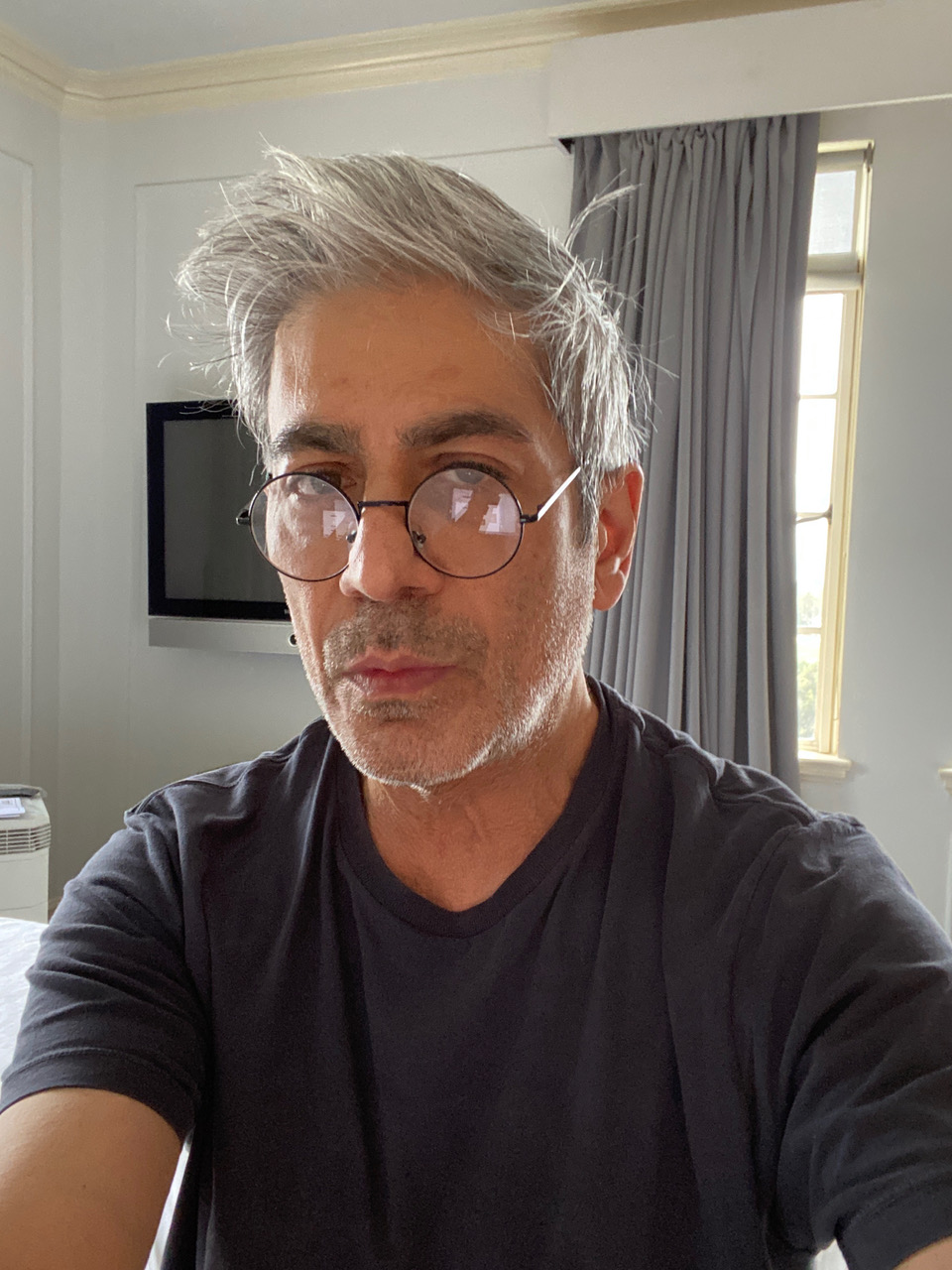
- Keshishian in 2022
- Born: July 30, 1964 (age 62); Beirut, Lebanon
- Education: Harvard University
- Occupations: Film director; film producer; commercial director; writer
- Years active: 1988–present
- Notable work: Madonna: Truth or Dare; Selena Gomez: My Mind & Me
- Website: www.alekkeshishian.com

Alek Keshishian (Armenian: Ալեք Գոորգի Քեշիշեան, born 30 July 1964) is an Armenian-American film and commercial director, writer, producer and music video director. His 1991 documentary, Madonna: Truth or Dare was the highest-grossing documentary of all time until 2002; it "changed the way filmmakers explored the world of celebrity" and had a "profound impact on LGBTQ representation in film".

== Early life and education ==
Keshishian was born in Beirut to Cecile Keshishian (née Simonian), and Kevork Keshishian, a pediatrician. The family immigrated to the United States in 1969. They lived briefly in Brookline, Massachusetts, and then moved to Manchester, New Hampshire. Immersed in the Armenian community, the Keshishians often housed Armenian refugees, and Keshishian and his younger sister, Aleen Keshishian, grew up speaking English and Armenian. Both siblings acted as children and toured with the New Hampshire Children's Theatre, American Children's Theatre, and the "I Like the U.S. of A" national touring company.

Keshishian attended St. Paul's School and Harvard University, graduating with honors in 1986. His senior thesis was a pop-opera adaptation of Wuthering Heights. The production, which included music by Kate Bush and Madonna, received significant attention.

== Career ==
=== Music videos, Truth or Dare, With Honors ===
Keshishian moved to Los Angeles following his graduation, where he directed music videos for artists including Bobby Brown, Run-DMC and Elton John. In 1991, when he was 26, Madonna called him; she had seen Wuthering Heights on VHS and followed his career. Four hours after they spoke, Keshishian went to a rehearsal for the Blond Ambition World Tour.

Initially commissioned by HBO to shoot backstage footage of Madonna at the start of the Blond Ambition tour in Japan, Keshishian filmed "everything, off and on stage." The strength of the Japanese footage, as well as the rapport between Keshishian and Madonna, led to making Truth or Dare, which became the biggest grossing documentary of its time. In an article that marked the 30th anniversary of the film's release, the Guardian reported that Keshishian was "less fascinated by Madonna's admittedly impressive onstage show than by the freewheeling circus of her backstage life, surrounded by her self-described "family" of assistants, adjuncts and predominantly queer backup dancers...Keshishian likened the crew to the bawdy ensemble of a Federico Fellini film; Truth or Dare, in turn, fashioned itself as the La Dolce Vita of rockumentaries, chaotically freeform and in thrall to sensuality and decadence, and shot largely in limber, grainy black-and-white for maximum vérité cred."

In 1994 Keshishian directed the feature film With Honors, which starred Joe Pesci, Brendan Fraser, and Patrick Dempsey. While it topped the box office the week of its release, the critical response to the film was lukewarm.

=== Commercial work, Love and Other Disasters, My Mind & Me ===
At age 29, Keshishian moved to London, where he focused on photography and commercials. He produced work for clients including Coca-Cola, Peugeot, Volkswagen, Brut by Fabergé, Aprilia, Baileys, and Max Factor. He also wrote, directed, and produced the independent film Love and Other Disasters. The film premiered at the Toronto International Film Festival and was shown as the gala screening for the London Lesbian and Gay Film Festival. Outfest also screened the film.

After returning to the US in 2006, he directed commercials and special projects including Jennifer Aniston's two Smartwater campaigns. He also directed the comedic shower shorts that featured Chelsea Handler with Sandra Bullock and Conan O'Brien.

In 2011, with Madonna, he co-wrote the screenplay for the film W.E..

In 2015 Keshishian directed the music video for Selena Gomez' song "Hands to Myself". Gomez, managed by Keshishian's sister Aleen, was a fan of Truth or Dare. In 2016, with the intention of making a documentary, Keshishian shot live and behind-the-scenes footage of Gomez during her Revival Tour. The documentary project was eventually shelved; Keshishian said in a later interview that Gomez was not in a "great place" at that time.

In 2019 Gomez asked him to shoot a trip she was making to Kenya on behalf of a charity and the documentary was reintroduced. Keshishian shot more than 200 hours of verite footage for the film. Titled My Mind & Me, it was released in 2022. In a review in the New York Times, Chris Azzopardi wrote that the film was "sincere and soul-baring" and that Keshishian "worked the same kind of magic on Madonna for Truth or Dare," noting that My Mind & Me "looks outward, framing struggle as the human condition."

== Films ==
- Madonna: Truth or Dare (1991) – documentary
- With Honors (1994)
- Love and Other Disasters (2006)
- W.E. (2011) – co-writer with Madonna
- Selena Gomez: My Mind & Me (2022) – documentary

== Music videos (partial list) ==
- "(He's Got) The Look" (1988) – Vanessa Williams
- "Dreamin'" (1988) – Vanessa Williams
- "Don't Be Cruel" (1988) – Bobby Brown
- "My Prerogative" (1988) – Bobby Brown
- "Don't Rush Me" (1988) – Taylor Dayne
- "Darlin' I" (1989) – Vanessa Williams
- "Every Little Step" (1989) – Bobby Brown
- "On Our Own" (1989) – Bobby Brown
- "Sacrifice" (1989) – Elton John
- "Like a Virgin (Truth or Dare version)" (1991) – Madonna
- "Holiday (Truth or Dare version)" (1991) – Madonna
- "This Used to Be My Playground" (1992) – Madonna
- "I'll Remember" (1994) – Madonna
- "Hold Me" (2000) – Savage Garden
- "Insatiable" (2002) – Darren Hayes
- "Hands to Myself" (2015) – Selena Gomez
- "Save It Til Morning" (2017) – Fergie
