= Just for Tonight (Vanessa Williams song) =

"Just For Tonight"

Single by Vanessa Williams

from the album The Comfort Zone
- B-side: "Love Like This"
- Released: April 21, 1992
- Recorded: 1990–1992
- Studio: The Bennett House (Franklin, TN); Nightingale Recording Studios (Nashville, TN); Digital Recorders (Nashville, TN)
- Genre: R&B
- Length: 4:14 (single remix); 4:28 (album version)
- Label: Wing
- Songwriters: Keith Thomas; Cynthia Weil
- Producer: Keith Thomas

Vanessa Williams singles chronology
"Save the Best for Last" (1992)	"Just For Tonight" (1992)	"Work to Do" (1992)

Audio video
- "Just For Tonight" on YouTube

"Just For Tonight" is the fourth single from Vanessa Williams' second studio album, The Comfort Zone (1991). The song was slightly remixed for the single and reached No. 2 on the US Adult Contemporary Charts. The single's B-side is "Whatever Happens", a song from her 1988 debut album The Right Stuff, while the CD single contains the previously unreleased song "Love Like This", which was later also to be included on the compilation album Love Songs (2004). The song is an R&B ballad and tells about a woman who wants to share one more night with her lover before their relationship ends.

== Track listings and formats ==
CD single

1. "Just For Tonight" (Single Remix) – 4:14
2. "Love Like This" (previously unreleased) – 5:10
3. "Whatever Happens" – 3:26

== Charts ==
=== Weekly charts ===
Chart (1992)	Peak position
Canada Top Singles (RPM)	10
Canada Adult Contemporary (RPM)	5
Netherlands (Dutch Top 40 Tipparade)	13
Netherlands (Single Top 100)	46
New Zealand (Recorded Music NZ)	45
US Billboard Hot 100	26
US Adult Contemporary (Billboard)	2
US Hot R&B/Hip-Hop Songs (Billboard)	11
US Cash Box Top 100	21

=== Year-end charts ===
Chart (1992)	Position
US Adult Contemporary (Billboard)	29
