= Save the Best for Last =

1992 single by Vanessa Williams

Single by Vanessa Williams

from the album The Comfort Zone
- B-side: "Freedom Dance"
- Released: January 14, 1992
- Genre: Pop; pop-soul; R&B
- Length: 3:40
- Label: Wing; Mercury
- Composers: Phil Galdston; Jon Lind
- Lyricists: Galdston; Wendy Waldman
- Producer: Keith Thomas

Vanessa Williams singles chronology
"The Comfort Zone" (1991)	"Save the Best for Last" (1992)	"Just for Tonight" (1992)

Music video
- "Save the Best for Last" on YouTube

"Save the Best for Last" is a song by American singer and actress Vanessa Williams from her second studio album, The Comfort Zone (1991). Written by Phil Galdston, Jon Lind, and Wendy Waldman, the song had been rejected by several female singers until Williams' record label secured it on her behalf. Produced by Keith Thomas, Wing and Mercury Records released it as The Comfort Zone's third single on January 14, 1992.

A pop ballad, the song is performed by a woman whose love interest overlooks her while pursuing several unsuccessful relationships, before ultimately realizing his feelings for her. Galdston originally conceived the song as an ironic story about romantic partners who conceal their worst traits until a relationship is ending, but Waldman suggested rewriting it into a more uplifting message. Some commentators have interpreted the song's themes of timing and patience as mirroring Williams' music career, which gained momentum in the 1990s following the 1984 nude photo scandal that forced her to resign as Miss America.

Music critics praised the song's production, radio-friendliness, and Williams' vocal performance. A major commercial success, it topped the Billboard Hot 100 for five weeks and became Williams' first number-one song on the chart. It was also successful internationally, reaching number-one in Australia and Canada, and entering the top-ten in five other countries. In 1993, it received three Grammy Award nominations: Song of the Year, Record of the Year, and Best Female Pop Vocal Performance. Two music videos were produced to promote the single; the original version was directed by Ralph Ziman. Williams has performed the song live on several occasions throughout her career, notably at the 35th Grammy Awards while she was visibly pregnant.

"Save the Best for Last" is considered to be Williams' signature song. Although Williams had achieved moderate success on the pop charts prior to the song's release, "Save the Best for Last" is widely credited with facilitating her crossover from urban to pop radio, establishing a signature sound for her musical output, helping rehabilitate her career following the Miss America scandal, and solidifying her status as a viable entertainer.

== Background ==
In 1983, Vanessa Williams was crowned the first Black winner of the Miss America pageant. The win proved controversial, and Williams received racist backlash and death threats from those who opposed her selection. Less than a year into her reign, the contest's organizers forced her to relinquish the title after Penthouse magazine announced plans to publish nude photographs she had posed for prior to participating in the pageant, without Williams' consent.

Following her resignation, Williams distanced herself from the public eye and focused on reinventing herself as an entertainer, pivoting towards a music career. After securing a record deal with Wing Records general manager Ed Eckstine, she released her debut album, The Right Stuff, in 1988. The album and its up-tempo title track were moderately successful, but the ballad "Dreamin'" ultimately became its breakthrough single. Although her team was pleased with the album's performance within the dance and R&B communities, Williams' follow-up album was positioned to further expand her reach into the mainstream pop market.

== Writing and recording ==
"Save the Best for Last" was written by Phil Galdston, Jon Lind, and Wendy Waldman. Galdston and Lind began working on the song during a March 1989 writing session in New York, USA, where they had originally intended to write a song for Steve Perry. Lind began singing over a motif Galdston had been playing on the keyboard, which became its melody. Galdston suggested the title "Save the Best for Last", a phrase he had rediscovered in his notebook, and they incorporated it into the song's melody. The title guided the song's evolution without a predetermined chorus nor structure. At the time, Galdston envisioned the title ironically, intending it to reflect someone hurt by their partner leaving at the end of their relationship. He later described the early concept as rooted in a pessimistic view of relationships, in which people reserve their worst efforts for the final moments, often when the relationship is already failing. Perry's song ultimately remained unfinished, and the pair wrote most of the music for "Save the Best for Last" in approximately 30 minutes during a single sitting. Galdston described the writing process as "organic", emphasizing heartfelt ideas over formula.

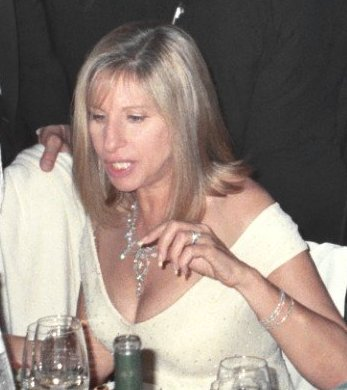
Singer Barbra Streisand (pictured in 1993) is one of the artists believed to have turned down "Save the Best for Last".

Once the melody was finalized, Lind encouraged Galdston to collaborate with Waldman on its lyrics. Nearly a month later, Galdston traveled to Nashville to work with Waldman. The tape he played for Waldman featured Lind singing "dummy lyrics". Although she liked the melody, Waldman felt the song's bitter, cynical premise did not compliment its uplifting melody, despite Galdston's explanations. She suggested reworking it into a hopeful song about a relationship's surprising turn of events. As the lyrics evolved, lines such as "Sometimes the sun goes 'round the moon" and "Sometimes the sun goes down in June" emerged, although Galdston initially protested that this line makes little sense. Once the lyrics were completed, Galdston and Waldman sent their writing tape to Lind. The following month, the three reunited in Los Angeles to record a demo. Lind and Galdston deliberately kept the demo's production simple and underproduced, omitting a drum machine in favor of electric piano, bass, synthesizer, synthesized strings, shaker, and Waldman's vocals.

After finishing the demo, the songwriters pitched "Save the Best for Last" to at least three high-profile female singers, all of whom rejected it. Barbra Streisand and Bette Midler are believed to have been among them. Around the same time, Williams had been sourcing material for her second studio album, The Comfort Zone (1991), and explicitly told Eckstine she was not interested in ballads about pining after men. Windswept Pacific Music publishing executive John Anderson played the demo for Eckstine, now President of Mercury Records, who sent it to Williams. Eckstine felt the song was a guaranteed hit for his artist and predicted it "would be a pivotal point in her career unless we f—ed it up in the studio". The singer first received the demo on cassette, sometime during the late-1980s. Williams thoroughly enjoyed and felt confident about delivering "Save the Best for Last", although she claims its songwriters doubted her despite having previously recorded and released successful ballads. Williams described its melody as an earworm, and recorded the track in one take. Eckstine doubted producer David Foster would have been interested in producing it at the time; he enlisted Keith Thomas, whose production style he considered similar to.

Both labels Wing Records and Mercury Records release "Save the Best for Last" as the third single from The Comfort Zone, on January 14, 1992. In the United Kingdom, it was distributed by Polydor Records. Although she considered "Save the Best for Last" her favorite of the album's 14 tracks, Williams stated that by the time the song was released as a single, she had essentially forgotten about it.

== Music and lyrics ==
"Save the Best for Last" has been characterized as a pop and pop-soul ballad. Although some critics have described it as R&B, Tom Breihan of Stereogum argued that the song "doesn't sound all that R&B". It is performed in the key of E♭ major with a tempo of 96 beats per minute in common time. Williams' vocals span from F_{3} to C_{5} in the song. Peter Piatkowski of PopMatters described it as a "lush, orchestrated ballad", while Eric Snider of the Tampa Bay Times classified it as middle-of-the-road. As a ballad, the song was a notable stylistic shift from the album's first two up-tempo singles and most of The Comfort Zone's tracks. Williams sings with a combination of innocence and wonder, and uses nuanced, rueful phrasing on some of the song's lyrics, such as "Isn't this world a crazy place?". Instrumentation includes strings, piano, and acoustic guitars.

"Save the Best for Last" addresses themes of unrequited love and the idea that patience can eventually lead to fulfillment. The song describes two friends eventually entering a romantic relationship that one of them had long considered destiny. Lyrically, the singer observes a platonic partner pursue a series of ill-fated relationships before he eventually falls in love with her, ultimately realizing he has been overlooking what had been in front of him. Music journalist Jason Lamphier observed that "Save the Best for Last" is lyrical anomaly among other ballads released that year, most of which were about rejection and heartache, whereas "Save the Best for Last" is about being friend zoned. According to Songfacts, the song's overall message "is that life is full of unexpected events that often lead to what's ultimately for the best". Its opening lyrics "Sometimes the snow comes down in June / sometimes the sun goes 'round the moon" have drawn particular attention. Journalist Drew Magary said the lyrics make no sense, and ShortList's Dave Fawbert ranked them among the "worst rhyming couplets in songs". Galdston himself joked about getting away with rhyming the word "June" with "moon", and explained that they are intended to invoke surprise. Morgan Enos of Grammy.com said the singer equates such images of cosmological reversals to "capricious love", continuing, "I see the passion in your eyes / Sometimes it's all a big surprise". Singer-songwriter Eric Hutchinson admitted that while the lyric originally confused him, he eventually learned to interpret it to mean longing, patience, and "holding out hope for true love until the last possible second, against all odds, and without a promise of the future".

Some music writers have described the song as topical and poignant within the context of Williams' career, particularly following the Miss America scandal that prompted her pivot into music and acting. Beviglia felt that "the song's message of happiness after a long period of trials and tribulations dovetailed with her story". According to the writer, some of the lines directly "speak to the vagaries of fate and how it takes a special kind of perseverance to withstand them", making it easy to find parallels to the song's own career trajectory.

== Reception ==
=== Critical response ===
Upon release, "Save the Best for Last" received positive reviews from music critics, who described it as an ideal combination of sexuality, softness and sophistication for Williams. The Orlando Sentinel called it "A sophisticated ballad", while Lynn Norment of Jet called it "wonderful". Larry Flick of Billboard magazine stated its production and orchestration "Proves that [Williams] is possibly best suited to such soothing fare, as her crystalline voice is caressed by soft and wafting strings". Mike Joyce of The Washington Post named it the album's most radio-friendly track, and Arion Berger of Entertainment Weekly declared it a show-stopper. Dave Sholin of the Gavin Report opined, "while Vanessa is by now accustomed to chart success, this effort takes her to a whole new level" and "deserves to become her biggest hit to-date". For the same publication, John Martinucci said the singer "Gives this beautiful ballad a simple and delicate presentation that'll lift any romantic spirit". C.J. of The Minnesota Star Tribune described it as "the most beautifully constructed, lyrically perfect love song to a stupid man ever recorded".

Other reviewers focused on Williams' vocal performance. While deeming "Save the Best for Last" the album's centerpiece, R. LaMont Jones Jr. from The Pittsburgh Press called it a song where Streisand would envy but "hard to imagine anyone doing it better" than Williams. Steve Pick from St. Louis Post-Dispatch described Williams' phrasing and dynamics as on par with experienced jazz singers. Randy Clark and Bryan DeVaney of Cashbox said the ballad is "Beautifully sung by Williams and tastefully produced and arranged by Keith Thomas". AllMusic's Michael Gallucci wrote that "Save the Best for Last" corrected the early decision to mask Williams' perceived vocal limitations with heavy production on The Right Stuff, demonstrating that, when given suitable material, she was capable of delivering a confident and effective vocal performance. Chris Rizik of SoulTracks said her "slight but tonally beautiful voice was perfect for the song, and her standout performance made 'Save the Best' one of the year's best and biggest singles". Some critics suggested that the song contributed to Williams' recovery from her Miss America abdication. In December 1992, Entertainment Weekly named Williams one of its "Entertainers of the Year", with writer Mark Harris noting that the success of "Save the Best for Last" helped render the Miss America controversy irrelevant. Jonathan Bernstein of Spin declared Williams the "Most triumphant of all the year's late bloomers", and said "Save the Best for Last" continues to bring him to tears.

Some critics offered more lukewarm assessments, describing the song as serviceable but largely generic. In 2021, Peter Piatkowski of PopMatters said the song's "overproduced yet still perfect" production is balanced by Williams' vocals. Chris Randle of Hazlitt wrote that while Williams' voice is relatively indistinct, it ultimately suits the song's material. Stephen Holden called it "mostly generic" despite being well-made. For AllMusic, Tim Sendra called it a "smooth and somewhat saccharine" ballad. Scott Shetler of Total Music Awards called it "a fairly plain song with a decently warm melody and one of the better performances of Vanessa Williams' career". Music historian David Freeland labeled it "plush, if unchallenging, pop music" which camouflaged with but was more restrained than the work of her peers, Mariah Carey and the late Whitney Houston.

=== Accolades ===
Music organization group ASCAP named it as its "Song of the Year", meaning it was performed more than any other song in 1992. It was nominated for three Grammy Awards at the 35th Annual Grammy Awards in 1993: Grammy Award for Song of the Year, Record of the Year, and Best Pop Vocal Performance, Female. That same year, at the Soul Train Music Awards, the song was nominated for Best R&B Song of the Year and Best R&B/Soul Single – Female. For recording "Save the Best for Last", Williams won the NAACP Image Award for Outstanding Female Artist at the 25th NAACP Image Awards in 1993.

Insider featured "Save the Best for Last" in their list of the "Best Songs from the '90s" in 2019, declaring it as "a gorgeous ballad", that "has stood the test of time." Elle ranked it among "the Best Love Songs of All Time".

== Commercial performance ==
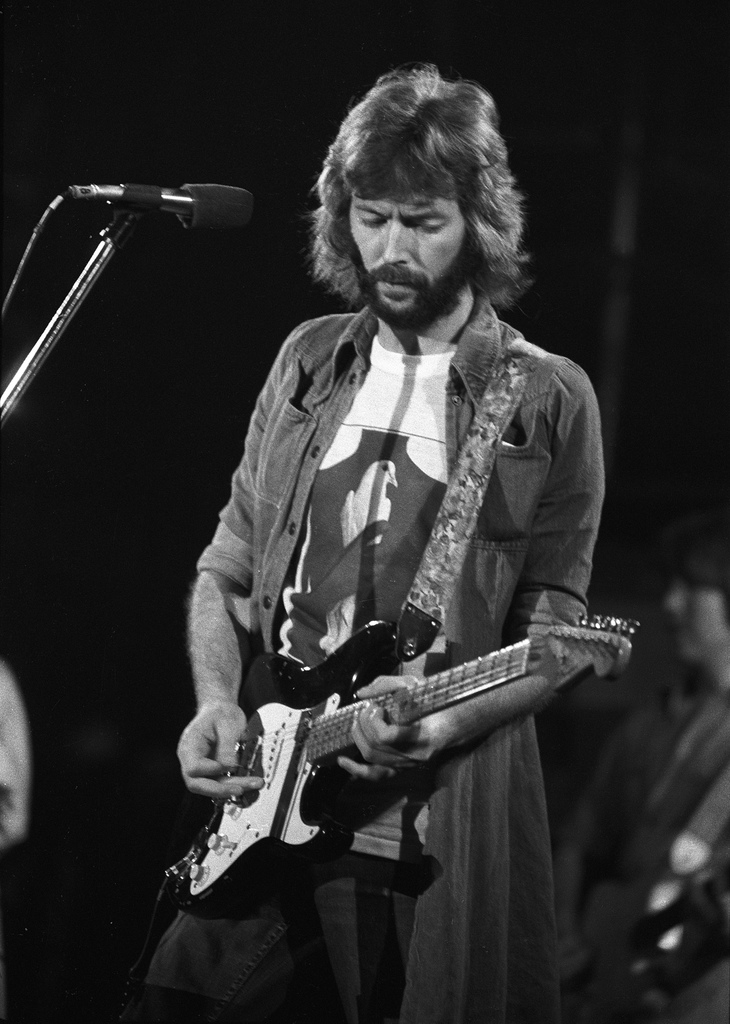
During its run on the Billboard Hot 100, "Save the Best for Last" prevented Eric Clapton's "Tears in Heaven" from reaching number one, but later lost two Grammy Awards to Clapton's song.

The single was Williams' third number-one on the R&B singles chart and topped both the US Billboard Hot 100 and the US Cash Box Top 100. It climbed from 20th to 11th the week of February 29, 1992, and was predicted to become her first top-five hit on the Hot 100, surpassing 1989's "Dreamin'" which had peaked at number eight. It reached the pole position on March 21, 1992, unseating "To Be with You" by Mr. Big. The song remained at number one on the Hot 100 for five consecutive weeks, tying Paula Abdul's "Rush Rush" (1991) as the longest-running number-one by a female artist of the previous seven years. It prevented "Tears in Heaven" by Eric Clapton from reaching number-one for several weeks, although it eventually lost two shared Grammy nominations to Clapton's song.

On March 28, it replaced "Diamonds and Pearls" by Prince & the New Power Generation at the top of the Hot R&B Singles chart. The song also went to number one on the US Adult Contemporary chart. The ballad became the first single to simultaneously top the Billboard Hot 100, Hot R&B Singles and Adult Contemporary charts since Whitney Houston's "All the Man That I Need". Its simultaneous Billboard run lasted three weeks from March 28 through April 11, falling short of the record set by Ray Charles, whose hit "I Can't Stop Loving You" spent four weeks simultaneously on all three charts in June 1962, and tying with Diana Ross and Lionel Richie's "Endless Love". Williams' three week simultaneous run was, however, a record set by a female artist at the time. Whitney Houston's "I Will Always Love You" would eventually break both Williams' record as well as the all-time record by Charles in January 1993.

Internationally, the single reached number one in Australia and Canada, number two in Ireland, and number three in the United Kingdom and the Netherlands. The strong performance of the single helped The Comfort Zone climb to the top-20 of the Billboard 200, by which month the album had already been ten months old. It remains the biggest hit of Williams' career, and her only Hot 100 number-one to-date.

== Music videos ==
There were two versions of the music video produced to promote the single. The original version of the music video, which primarily aired on MTV, was directed by Kevin Bray and South African Ralph Ziman in two separate scenes (holiday and B&W), and features Williams singing in a winter setting, intercut with closeups projected onto a screen in front of an orchestra. It begins with Williams walking around in a winter landscape for the first few seconds, then intercuts between black-and-white footage of partially-nude Williams singing in front of a dark curtain, an orchestra (with composer) playing along to the blue-tinted footage as it is being projected on a screen, and Williams singing in a living room with candles, a fireplace and a sofa. A "behind-the-scenes" cut was also later made of the video, which primarily aired on VH1, predominantly zooming on the orchestra scenes and the blue-tinted footage of Williams as well as showcasing footage from the making of the video. Drew Magary said the video cemented Williams as one of the most attractive women of the 1990s. At the 1992 MTV Video Music Awards, the video was nominated for Best Female Video.

== Live performances ==
Williams performed "Save the Best for Last" at the 35th Annual Grammy Awards in 1993, where the song had been nominated for three Grammy Awards. At the time, Williams was eight months pregnant, with her third child. Williams stated that, during the performance, she experienced visions of going into labor and was worried she would struggle to maintain breath support. She wore a loose-fitting black dress and performed while seated, with the broadcast relying largely on close-up shots of her face to minimize attention to her pregnancy. In retrospect, both journalists and Williams herself have noted how society has since become more accepting of visible pregnancies at award shows and performances, as seen with artists such as Beyoncé and Cardi B. She sang it on the May 16, 1992 episode of Saturday Night Live, where she had been the episode's musical guest.

Since the 1990s, Williams has performed "Save the Best for Last" live on several occasions. In February 2014, Williams sang "Save the Best for Last" during a "Love Day" concert at the Caesars Hotel and Casino, which received a standing ovation. In 2016, she included the song in her setlist for the Lincoln Center's American Songbook series. In 2016, she sang it at the VH1 Divas Holiday: Unsilent Night Christmas special, for which she was introduced by her real-life daughter, Jillian Hervey. Entertainment Weekly's Joey Nolfi called her performance "a gorgeous version". In 2017, she received positive reviews for performing it for Seth Rudetsky's interview-concert series Broadway Up Close at the Kimmel Center for the Performing Arts. In 2018, she included it in her set for the Pacific Symphony's Pops Series at the Segerstrom Concert Hall. In December 2020, Williams concluded her segment of the livestream concert series Live from the West Side: Women of Broadway with a performance of "Save the Best for Last". The concert was presented remotely due to the COVID-19 pandemic and was held to benefit participating theaters.

== Covers and usage in media ==
Waldman has performed the song live, both solo and as a member of the folk rock trio The Refugees. In 1996, Pam Sheyne recorded a dance cover version under the alias "Laura Blake". Alexandra Shipp covered the song in the television film Aaliyah: The Princess of R&B (2014), a biographical film about the singer Aaliyah, whom Shipp portrays. Aaliyah never recorded the song; her family declined to license most of her music for the film, requiring the production to rely largely on cover versions of songs by other artists. In the film, Aaliyah performs the song to audition for R. Kelly (portrayed by Clé Bennett). In a 2021 episode of her talk show, singer Kelly Clarkson covered "Save the Best for Last" during the "Kellyoke" segment. Clarkson had previously performed the song in 2002 while competing on the first season of the reality television singing competition American Idol, which she ultimately won. Actor Noah Reid covered the song in a 2022 episode of the television series Outer Range. In 2024, Reid performed the song live at the Winnipeg Folk Festival.

The song was used in the United Kingdom in a series of television advertisements for Bisto Best gravy granules during the 1990s. The commercials featured slow motion footage of gravy being poured over a roasted dinner while the song played in the background. Williams has confirmed that, despite her entertainment career, she is best known in the United Kingdom as the performer of the song used in the advertisements. An October 1992 episode of the sketch comedy series In Living Color, titled "Black People Awards", featured a parody of the song in which Williams, portrayed by Kim Wayans, confronts those who did not support her during the Miss America scandal while flaunting her successful music career. The track is used during the closing credits of the LGBTQ+ Down Under film The Adventures of Priscilla, Queen of the Desert (1994), showing a drag queen lip-synching to Williams' recording. It is also included on the film's original soundtrack album.

== Legacy ==
"Save the Best for Last" is considered to be Williams' signature song. The ballad is regarded as an "adult contemporary staple", becoming a popular selection for occasions and events such as weddings, graduations and proms, has frequently appeared on romance-themed compilation albums, and is widely performed at karaoke. In 2011, Billboard ranked "Save the Best for Last" the 58th most impactful song on their US Adult Contemporary chart, out of 100. Singer-songwriter Eric Hutchinson named "Save the Best for Last" the song he most closely associates with school dances, especially during fall 1992 when "Williams reigned supreme". The song's success drew the attention of songwriters eager to have their own work featured on Williams' follow-up album. Piatkowski believes its popularity established a trademark sound for Williams, which would inform the musical direction of her most successful songs throughout the rest of the decade, namely the Hot 100 hits "Love Is" (1993), "The Sweetest Days" (1994), and "Colors of the Wind" (1995). In addition to pivoting away from the dance and urban-pop singer when she had been marketed as for her debut album, Piatkowski said the track also defined her career, establishing her as both a superstar and a pop icon. In the book Baker's Biographical Dictionary of Popular Musicians Since 1990, historian David Freeland asserted that "Save the Best for Last" is the moment Williams "became a pop star".

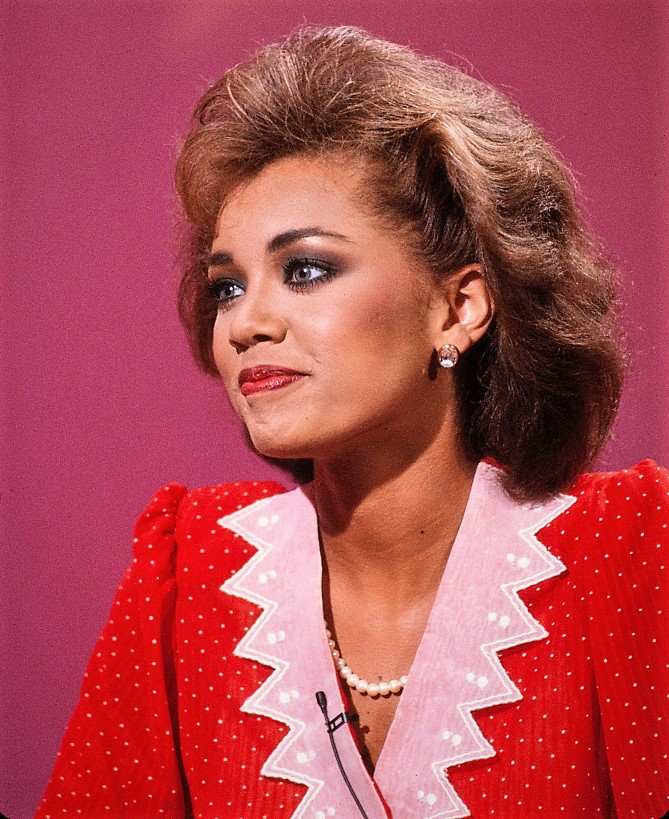
Music critics have noted that the success of "Save the Best for Last" finalized Williams' transition from former Miss America to established pop star, with the song's popularity often overshadowing her earlier pageant career.

“Save the Best for Last” became one of the most commercially successful singles of the early 1990s, which AllMusic biographer Andy Kellman described as "a ubiquitous across-the-board smash". Prior to its release, Williams had achieved some crossover success on pop radio, although much of her airplay remained concentrated on urban contemporary stations. While Black radio stations supported Williams' music, other formats appeared hesitant to grant her consistent airplay, even as contemporaries with similar-sounding records found success. Amit Vaidya of Rolling Stone India credits "Save the Best for Last" with completing Williams' crossover into mainstream pop and adult contemporary music, describing it as "a ballad too strong for any radio programmer to not play". Songwriter Kipper Jones, who had previously worked with Williams on The Right Stuff, stated that "Save the Best for Last" changed the artistic trajectory of Williams' career, shifting her focus from R&B toward a more mainstream pop audience. In 2021, Williams selected "Save the Best for Last" as the defining song of her music career, stating that its success demonstrated to critics that she could be taken seriously as a recording artist. While reviewing her first greatest hits album, Greatest Hits: The First Ten Years (1998), Michael Gallucci ranked it among the strongest songs in her discography and credited it with helping "certify Williams is more than just a pretty face". For the same publication, Tim Sendra stated that while "big ballads" are a specialty of Williams, few similar ballads in her career have experienced the same success or longevity.

Journalists have suggested that the song aided Williams in reforming her public image following the Miss America controversy. Vaidya summarized "Save the Best for Last" as the culmination of Williams' prolonged effort to regain public acceptance, writing, "1983 may have been the year she first wore the crown, 1992 is the year she truly reigned supreme". Entertainment Weekly's Marl Harris reported that, by 1992, much of Williams' newer fans were already unaware that she had ever been Miss America. Tom Breihan of Stereogum said the song essentially relegated the pageant to "a career footnote". In April 1993, following the song's Grammy nomination and a decade after Williams won Miss America, Penthouse published an article claiming that the release of the unauthorized photographs had been the key catalyst for her international fame. The author referenced the song's title, writing, "given her talent and determination, we've yet to hear the best or the last of this extraordinary woman". In 2023, music journalist Jason Lamphier said that, with the song, Williams had staged "one of the most memorable comebacks in entertainment history".

According to Williams, following the success of "Save the Best for Last", figures within the music industry questioned why they had not previously received nor heard the song, with few acknowledging that they had initially failed to recognize its potential. "Save the Best for Last" also influenced the songwriters' careers. They frequently received requests for similar songs, but those they submitted were often regarded as lacking the memorable hooks of the original, even though Galdston has said the song itself succeeded without relying heavily on a hook. "Save the Best for Last" proved particularly significant in Waldman's career, becoming her most successful song as a songwriter following her transition from a solo recording artist in the 1980s, after previously achieving most of her songwriting success within the country music genre. A year later, Galdston, Waldman, and Lind reunited to write another song for Williams, "The Sweetest Days", which became the title track and lead single from the singer's 1994 follow-up album of the same name.

== Track listings ==
- UK vinyl, 7-inch

A: "Save the Best for Last" – 3:39
B: "2 of a Kind" – 5:15

- Netherlands 12-inch, promo

A: "Save the Best for Last" – 3:39
B1: "2 of a Kind" – 5:15
B2: "Dreamin'" – 5:25

- Europe single
1. "Save the Best for Last" – 3:39
2. "2 of a Kind" – 5:15
3. "Dreamin'" – 5:25
- US maxi-CD
1. "Save the Best for Last" – 3:39
2. "Freedom Dance (Get Free!)" (LP Version) – 4:13
3. "Freedom Dance (Get Free!)" (Free Your Body Club Mix) – 6:59
4. "Freedom Dance (Get Free!)" (Vanessa's Sweat Mix) – 5:21
5. "The Right Stuff" (UK Mix) – 6:18

== Credits and personnel ==
Adapted from Apple Music

- Vanessa Williams – vocals, vocal arranger
- Keith Thomas – production, songwriting, arrangement, string arrangement, keyboards, programming, bass, drum programming
- Phil Galdston – songwriting, composing
- Wendy Waldman – songwriting, composing
- Jon Lind – songwriting
- Ronn Huff – orchestration, string conducting
- The Nashville String Machine – strings
- Jerry McPherson – acoustic guitar
- Bill Whittington – mixing engineer
- Herb Powers – mastering engineer
- Charles Puls – assistant recording engineer
- Gary Paczosa – assistant recording engineer
- Roy Gamble – assistant recording engineer
- Shawn McLean – assistant recording engineer
- Steve Charles – assistant recording engineer
- Todd Moore – assistant recording engineer
- Jeff Giedt – assistant mixing engineer
- John Kunz – assistant mixing engineer

== Charts ==
=== Weekly charts ===
Chart (1992)	Peak position
Australia (ARIA)	1
Belgium (Ultratop 50 Flanders)	7
Canada Retail Singles (The Record)	1
Canada Top Singles (RPM)	1
Canada Adult Contemporary (RPM)	1
Europe (Eurochart Hot 100)	6
Europe (European Dance Radio)	4
Germany (GfK)	19
Ireland (IRMA)	2
Netherlands (Dutch Top 40)	3
Netherlands (Single Top 100)	4
New Zealand (Recorded Music NZ)	15
Panama (UPI)	9
Sweden (Sverigetopplistan)	26
Switzerland (Schweizer Hitparade)	6
UK Singles (Official Charts)	3
UK Airplay (Music Week)	1
US Billboard Hot 100	1
US Adult Contemporary (Billboard)	1
US Hot R&B/Hip-Hop Songs (Billboard)	1
US Cash Box Top 100	1

=== Year-end charts ===
Chart (1992)	Position
Australia (ARIA)	11
Belgium (Ultratop)	65
Brazil (Crowley)	4
Canada Top Singles (RPM)	26
Canada Adult Contemporary (RPM)	12
Europe (Eurochart Hot 100)	69
Germany (Media Control)	96
Netherlands (Dutch Top 40)	30
Netherlands (Single Top 100)	42
Switzerland (Schweizer Hitparade)	36
UK Singles (OCC)	53
UK Airplay (Music Week)	18
US Billboard Hot 100	4
US Adult Contemporary (Billboard)	1
US Hot R&B Singles (Billboard)	21
US Cash Box Top 100	7

=== Decade-end charts ===
Chart (1990–1999)	Position
Canada (Nielsen SoundScan)	84
US Billboard Hot 100	47

== Certifications ==
Region	Certification	Certified units/sales
Australia (ARIA)	Platinum	70,000^{^}
New Zealand (RMNZ)	Gold	15,000^{‡}
United Kingdom (BPI)	Silver	200,000^{‡}
United States (RIAA)	Gold	500,000^{^}
^{^} Shipments figures based on certification alone.^{‡} Sales+streaming figures based on certification alone.

== Release history ==
Region	Date	Format(s)	Label(s)	Ref.
United States	January 14, 1992	7-inch vinyl; CD; cassette	Wing; Mercury	
Japan	February 26, 1992	Mini-CD	Polydor	
United Kingdom	March 9, 1992	7-inch vinyl; 12-inch vinyl; CD; cassette	Polydor	
Australia	March 16, 1992	CD; cassette	Polydor	

== Other-language versions ==
The tune is the basis of the German-language song "Märchenland Gefühl" (literal translation: fairy tale-land feeling) and the Dutch-language song "Iets Heeft je Zachtjes Aangeraakt" (literal translation: something touched you softly), both by Belgian artist Dana Winner. Hong Kong cantopop singer Shirley Kwan also has a Cantonese cover version entitled "Why Us." (為何是我們).

== See also ==
- List of Billboard Hot 100 number ones of 1992
- List of Hot Adult Contemporary number ones of 1992
- List of Hot R&B Singles number ones of 1992
