= Darlin' I =

1989 single by Vanessa Williams

Single by Vanessa Williams

from the album The Right Stuff
- Released: January 20, 1989
- Studio: Ocean Way Recording (Los Angeles)
- Genre: R&B
- Length: 4:07
- Label: Wing
- Songwriters: Rex Salas; Kenny Harris
- Producer: Rex Salas

Vanessa Williams singles chronology
"Dreamin'" (1988)	"Darlin' I" (1989)	"Running Back to You" (1991)

Music video
- "Vanessa Williams - Darlin' I (Official Music Video)" on YouTube

"Darlin' I" is a song by American singer Vanessa Williams, released as the fourth and final single from her debut studio album, The Right Stuff (1988).

== Music video ==
The music video for the song is filmed in black and white based on the series I Love Lucy, directed by Alek Keshishian.

== Charts ==
Chart performance for "Darlin' I"
Chart (1989)	Peak position
US Billboard Hot 100	88
US Adult Contemporary (Billboard)	10
US Hot R&B/Hip-Hop Songs (Billboard)	10
US Cash Box Top 100 Singles	82
US Top R&B Singles (Cash Box)	13
