= Where Do We Go from Here (Vanessa Williams song) =

1996 single by Vanessa Williams

Single by Vanessa Williams

from the album Greatest Hits: The First Ten Years
- Released: June 11, 1996
- Length: 4:19
- Label: Mercury
- Songwriters: David Foster; Evan Kopelson; Douglas Pashley; Linda Thompson
- Producer: David Foster

Vanessa Williams singles chronology
"You Can't Run" (1995)	"Where Do We Go from Here" (1996)	"Do You Hear What I Hear?" (1996)

Audio video
- "Where Do We Go from Here" on YouTube

"Where Do We Go from Here" is a song by American actress and singer Vanessa Williams. Produced by David Foster, it was featured in the 1996 film Eraser, in which Williams co-stars with Arnold Schwarzenegger, though not included on its soundtrack album. The song would later appear on Williams' 1998 greatest hits album Greatest Hits: The First Ten Years. In the United States, the single peaked at number 71 on the Billboard Hot 100 and climbed to number five on the Billboard Adult Contemporary chart.

== Critical reception ==
Larry Flick from Billboard magazine wrote, "It's always a pleasure to hear Williams work her smooth style in a ballad setting. Time continues to treat her voice well, as evidenced by this theme song". He also noted, "She displays a warm and worldly quality within a wonderfully theatrical arrangement by David Foster. The song has over brassy horn flourishes and a sweet undercurrent of orchestral strings." Alan Jones from Music Week described the song as "a lushly-orchestrated ballad". He added, "Williams sings it immaculately and deserves to have another hit to sit alongside 'Save the Best for Last' but, while something of an emotional maelstrom, the song is also rather subtle and failed to garnish the same response."

== Music video ==
The official music video for the song was directed by British director Andy Morahan.

== Charts ==
Chart (1996)	Peak position
Canada Top Singles (RPM)	29
Canada Adult Contemporary (RPM)	8
Germany (Media Control)	87
Netherlands (Dutch Top 40 Tipparade)	13
Netherlands (Dutch Single Tip)	7
Sweden (Topplistan)	30
US Billboard Hot 100	71
US Adult Contemporary (Billboard)	5
US Hot R&B Singles (Billboard)	90
US Cash Box Top 100	66
