= The Sweetest Days (song) =

Single by Vanessa Williams

from the album The Sweetest Days
- B-side: "Dreamin'"
- Released: October 18, 1994
- Genre: Pop; R&B; soul
- Length: 3:31
- Label: Wing; Mercury
- Songwriters: Jon Lind; Wendy Waldman; Phil Galdston
- Producer: Keith Thomas

Vanessa Williams singles chronology
| "Love Is" (1993) | "The Sweetest Days" (1994) | "The Way That You Love" (1995) |

Music video
- "Vanessa Williams - The Sweetest Days (Official Music Video)" on YouTube

"The Sweetest Days" is a song by American singer and actress Vanessa Williams, released on October 18, 1994, by Wing Records, as the first single from her third studio album of the same name (1994). The song was written by the same team who previously penned her 1992 hit "Save the Best for Last" for Williams and was produced by Keith Thomas. The single reached No. 18 on the US Billboard Hot 100 and No. 3 on the Billboard Adult Contemporary chart.

== Critical reception ==
Upon the release, Larry Flick from Billboard magazine described it as a "glorious pop ballad that has a slight resemblance to her Grammy-nominated hit 'Save the Best for Last'." He added, "The song has a lilting and thoroughly engaging melody and a lovely, if somewhat melancholy, lyric that glistens with universal appeal. Williams is in excellent vocal form, offering a well-shaded performance amid a plush arrangement of warm strings and horns."

== Music video ==
The accompanying music video for "The Sweetest Days" is shot in two different ways. The "romantic version" was shot in an apartment overlooking a city skyline while the "urban version" shows Williams walking in a park and through streets. There are a few clips that they both share in the same spots but for the 3-minute and 31-second video, they give the song a different feel.

== Track listings and formats ==
- CD single 851 110-2
1. "The Sweetest Days"
2. "Love Is"
- CD maxi-single 851 113-2
1. "The Sweetest Days"
2. "What Child Is This"
3. "Have Yourself a Merry Little Christmas"
4. "Whatever Happens"
- Special Collector's Edition CD maxi-single 851 111-2
1. "The Sweetest Days" – 3:31
2. "Love Is" – 4:44
3. "Save the Best for Last" – 3:39
4. "Dreamin'" – 5:26

== Charts ==
=== Weekly charts ===
| Chart (1994) | Peak position |
|---|---|
| Australia (ARIA) | 47 |
| Canada Retail Singles (The Record) | 14 |
| Canada Top Singles (RPM) | 6 |
| Canada Adult Contemporary (RPM) | 1 |
| Europe (European Hit Radio) | 40 |
| Israel (Israeli Singles Chart) | 3 |
| Netherlands (Dutch Top 40 Tipparade) | 18 |
| Netherlands (Single Top 100 Tipparade) | 7 |
| Scottish Singles Sales (Official Charts) | 49 |
| UK Singles (Official Charts) | 41 |
| UK Hip Hop/R&B (Official Charts) | 10 |
| US Billboard Hot 100 | 18 |
| US Adult Contemporary (Billboard) | 3 |
| US Hot R&B/Hip-Hop Songs (Billboard) | 40 |
| US Pop Airplay (Billboard) | 22 |
| US Rhythmic Airplay (Billboard) | 22 |
| US Cash Box Top 100 | 16 |

=== Year-end charts ===
| Chart (1995) | Position |
|---|---|
| Canada Top Singles (RPM) | 44 |
| Canada Adult Contemporary (RPM) | 14 |
| US Billboard Hot 100 | 75 |
| US Adult Contemporary (Billboard) | 21 |

== Release history ==
| Region | Date | Format(s) | Label(s) | Ref. |
|---|---|---|---|---|
| United States | October 18, 1994 | 7-inch vinyl; CD; cassette | Wing; Mercury | |
| Japan | December 1, 1994 | Mini-CD | Wing; Mercury | |
| Australia | February 13, 1995 | CD; cassette | Wing; Mercury | |
| United Kingdom | March 27, 1995 | CD; cassette | Wing; Mercury | |
