= Silver & Gold (Vanessa Williams album) =

Studio album by Vanessa Williams
- Released: October 12, 2004
- Recorded: 2003–2004
- Studio: Abbey Road Studios (London, England) link; Angel Recording Studios (London, England) link; Sound on Sound Studios (New York, NY) link
- Genre: Christmas; R&B
- Label: YMC Universal
- Producer: Rob Mathes

Vanessa Williams chronology
| Next (1997) | Silver & Gold (2004) | Everlasting Love (2005) |

Singles from Silver & Gold
- 1. "Silver and Gold" Released: September 21, 2004; 2. "Merry Christmas Darling" Released: December 7, 2004

Silver & Gold is the sixth studio album and second Christmas album by American singer and actress Vanessa Williams, originally released in the United States on October 12, 2004, by Lava Records and purchased by YMC Records in 2005. It gained critical acclaim like its predecessor, Star Bright, did in 1996, although not a major success, selling only 100,000 copies to date. The album peaked at number 120 on the Billboard 200, number 46 on the Top R&B/Hip-Hop Albums, number 24 on the Top Holiday Albums, and number two on the Top Gospel Albums. "Merry Christmas Darling" and the title track became decent hits that holiday season due to airplay, the former reaching number 18 and the latter reaching number four on the Hot Adult Contemporary Tracks chart.

Since its initial release, the album has been reissued twice in the United States. In 2006, YMC re-released it under the 20th Century Masters: The Christmas Collection line with the subtitle The Best of Vanessa Williams, Vol. 2. This release was distributed by Universal (Volume 1 being their re-issue of Star Bright). Its second reissue came in 2016, once again under YMC Records, but this time distributed by the budget line, Sony Music Commercial Music Group, removing most of the album's liner notes and leaving only the production credits intact.

Professional ratings
Review scores
| Source | Rating |
|---|---|
| AllMusic | link |
| Blender | 3/5 stars |

== Track listing ==
1. "Silver and Gold" – 3:29
2. "Joy to the World" (featuring Brian McKnight) – 4:52
3. "Mary's Little Boy Child" – 6:33
4. "Silent Night" – 4:28
5. "Winter Weather" – 3:01
6. "The Little Drummer Boy" – 5:13
7. "Merry Christmas Darling" – 3:50
8. "Rise Up, Shepherd and Follow" – 4:53
9. "Prelude: I Dream a World" – 1:20
10. "December Lullaby" – 4:34
11. "The Holly and the Ivy" – 3:33
12. "Christmas Is" – 4:47
13. "Have Yourself a Merry Little Christmas" – 4:01

== Charts ==
Chart performance for Silver & Gold
| Chart (2004–2005) | Peak position |
|---|---|
| US Billboard 200 | 120 |
| US Top Gospel Albums (Billboard) | 2 |
| US Top Holiday Albums (Billboard) | 24 |
| US Top R&B/Hip-Hop Albums (Billboard) | 46 |

== Release history ==
Release history for Silver & Gold
| Region | Date | Label | Ref. |
|---|---|---|---|
| Japan | October 27, 2004 | Warner Music Japan | |
