= (He's Got) The Look =

1988 single by Vanessa Williams

Single by Vanessa Williams

from the album The Right Stuff
- Released: April 12, 1988
- Studio: The Music Palace (West Hempstead, New York); Westlake (West Hollywood, California) (Note: Vanessa Williams' vocals and trombone solo)
- Genre: R&B
- Length: 4:20
- Label: Wing
- Songwriters: Adil Bayyan; Amir Bayyan; Wesley Thomas Jr.
- Producer: Amir Bayyan

Vanessa Williams singles chronology
"The Right Stuff" (1988)	"(He's Got) The Look" (1988)	"Dreamin'" (1989)

Audio video
- "[He's Got] That Look" on YouTube

"(He's Got) The Look" is a song by American singer Vanessa Williams, released as the second single from her debut studio album, The Right Stuff (1988). The single peaked at number 10 on Billboard's Hot Black Singles chart. The song was co-written and produced by Amir Bayyan.

== Track listings ==
- US 7-inch single
1. "(He's Got) The Look" – 4:20
2. "The Right Stuff" (Rex's Mix - LA Style) – 4:32
- CD single
1. "(He's Got) The Look" (Dance Version) – 6:38
2. "(He's Got) The Look" (Dub Version) – 5:26
3. "The Right Stuff" (Rex's Mix - LA Style) – 4:32
- 12-inch maxi single
1. "(He's Got) The Look" (Radio Version) – 4:20
2. "(He's Got) The Look" (Dance Version) – 6:38
3. "(He's Got) The Look" (Dub Version) – 5:26
4. "(He's Got) The Look" (Album Version) – 5:07

== Charts ==
Chart performance for "(He's Got) The Look"
Chart (1988)	Peak position
US Dance Singles Sales (Billboard)	49
US Hot R&B/Hip-Hop Songs (Billboard)	10
US Top Black Contemporary Singles (Cash Box)	10
