= Running Back to You =

Single by Vanessa Williams

from the album The Comfort Zone
- B-side: "Better Off Now"
- Released: July 18, 1991
- Recorded: 1991
- Studio: D&D Recording Studios (New York, NY); Marathon Studios (New York, NY); Home Base Recording (New York, NY)
- Genre: Dance-pop; R&B
- Length: 4:39
- Label: Wing
- Songwriters: Trevor Gale; Kenni Hairston
- Producers: Bob Rosa; Kenni Hairston; DJ L.A. Jay; Rob Von Arx; Trevor Gale

Vanessa Williams singles chronology
"Darlin' I" (1989)	"Running Back to You" (1991)	"The Comfort Zone" (1991)

Music video
- "Vanessa Williams - Running Back To You" on YouTube

"Running Back to You" is a song by American singer and actress Vanessa Williams, released in July 1991 by Wing Records as the lead single from her second studio album, The Comfort Zone (1991). It features samples from The J.B.'s "The Grunt" (1970) and John Davis and the Monster Orchestra's "I Can't Stop" (1976). The single became one of the biggest hits of her career; it topped the US Billboard Hot R&B/Hip-Hop Songs chart for two weeks from October 5 to October 12, 1991, and reached number eighteen on the Billboard Hot 100. A colorful music video, directed by Ralph Ziman, was shot for the single. Williams performed the song on The Arsenio Hall Show in 1991. At the Grammy Awards in 1992, the song received a Grammy Award nomination for Best Female R&B Vocal Performance.

== Track listings and formats ==
- US CD single
1. "Running Back to You" (Vanessa's Club Mix) – 7:56
2. "Running Back to You" (Vanessa's Sweat Mix) – 5:09
3. "Running Back to You" (DNA Extended) – 5:02
4. "Running Back to You" (Flip Hop Mix) – 7:01
- US 12" single
1. "Running Back to You" (The Mix) – 4:41
2. "Running Back to You" (Edit) – 4:04
3. "Running Back to You (Flip Hop Extended Version) – 7:01
4. "Running Back to You (Flip Hop Edit) – 4:29
- US cassette single
1. "Running Back to You" (Edit) – 4:04

Special previews:

2. "The Comfort Zone" – 1:00
3. "Save the Best for Last" – 1:00
4. "Still in Love" – 1:00
5. "Better Off Now" – 3:57

Special previews:

2. "The Comfort Zone" – 1:00
3. "Save the Best for Last – 1:00
4. "Still in Love – 1:00
- UK 7" single
1. "Running Back to You" (DNA 7")
2. "Running Back to You" (U.S. 7")
- UK 12" single
1. "Running Back to You" (DNA 12")
2. "Running Back to You" (Vanessa's Club Mix) – 7:56
3. "Better Off Now"

== Charts ==
Chart (1991)	Peak position
Australia (ARIA)	102
Canada Top Singles (RPM)	86
Canada Dance/Urban (RPM)	1
UK Dance (Music Week)	54
UK Club Chart (Record Mirror)	25
US Billboard Hot 100	18
US Hot R&B/Hip-Hop Songs (Billboard)	1
US Dance Club Songs (Billboard)	2
US Dance Singles Sales (Billboard)	1

== See also ==
- List of Hot R&B Singles number ones of 1991
