= Oh How the Years Go By =

"Oh How the Years Go By" is a song written by Simon Climie and Will Jennings. It was originally included on Climie's debut solo album Soul Inspiration in 1992 and released as a single in 1993 but failed to chart.

== Cover versions ==
=== John Miles cover ===
English musician John Miles recorded a cover version of the song for his 1993 studio album Upfront.

=== Amy Grant cover ===
"Oh How the Years Go By"

Single by Amy Grant

from the album House of Love
- Released: 1994
- Studio: Tejas Recorders (Franklin, TN)
- Genre: CCM, Adult Contemporary, Pop
- Length: 5:15
- Label: A&M, Word
- Songwriters: Simon Climie, Will Jennings
- Producer: Michael Omartian

Amy Grant singles chronology
"Big Yellow Taxi" (1995)	"Oh How the Years Go By" (1994)	"Takes a Little Time" (1997)

Singer-songwriter Amy Grant covered the song and included it on her 1994 album House of Love. It was the sixth release from that album.

- Original album version (5:15), available on the House of Love album
- Radio edit, available on the single with an audio introduction
- Original album version with audio introduction, available on the single
- Live version (4:35), available on the Time Again... Amy Grant Live album

=== Vanessa Williams cover ===
"Oh How the Years Go By"

Single by Vanessa Williams

from the album Next
- Released: 1997
- Recorded: 1996
- Studio: The Bennett House (Franklin, TN)
- Genre: R&B; pop
- Length: 5:10
- Songwriters: Simon Climie; Will Jennings
- Producer: Keith Thomas

Vanessa Williams singles chronology
"First Thing on Your Mind" (1997)	"Oh How the Years Go By" (1997)	"Who Were You Thinkin' 'Bout?" (1998)

Audio video
- "Oh How The Years Go By" on YouTube

In 1996, the song was covered by actress-singer Vanessa Williams and included on the Polygram various artist compilation album NBA at 50 - A Musical Celebration. It was later included on her 1997 studio album Next and released as a single. Her version went to number 6 on the Billboard Adult Contemporary chart.

==== Charts ====
===== Weekly charts =====
Chart (1997–1998)	Peak position
US Adult Contemporary (Billboard)	6

===== Year-end charts =====
Chart (1998)	Position
US Adult Contemporary (Billboard)	24
