= Rex Salas =

American record producer (born 1962)

- Born: March 16, 1962 (age 63); Maryland, United States
- Origin: Prince George's County, Maryland, United States
- Occupations: Record producer; songwriter; musical director; music arranger
- Years active: 1980s–present
- Spouse: Stacee Brown (m. 1996)

Rex Salas (born March 16, 1962) is a Grammy and Emmy Award nominated American record producer, songwriter, musical director, and music arranger. Best known in recent years for his work as the musical director for Janet Jackson on several of her tours, Salas has worked with many other notable artists.

== Early years ==
Salas was born on March 16, 1962, in Prince George's County, Maryland, to parents Tomas and Mary. He left Maryland as a young child and moved to California, where he studied the guitar, bass, drums, and keyboards, eventually focusing on piano and keyboards as his main instruments.

Salas attended Carson High School in Carson, California, Salas was a cofounder of the band Tease, which recorded three albums on the RCA and CBS/Epic labels between 1983 and 1988.

Salas left Tease after the release of its first album, although several of his compositions were used in subsequent albums, and he was reunited with the band for a 1987 tour.

== Songwriting and music production ==
As a member of Tease, Salas developed songwriting and arranging skills that would later aid him in producing recordings for multi-platinum artists including Vanessa Williams (for “The Right Stuff,” which earned Salas a Grammy nomination), and Boyz II Men (for “It’s So Hard To Say Goodbye to Yesterday”, the 1991 song that was featured on the soundtrack to Lethal Weapon 3 and that at the time was the group's biggest-selling single).

Salas has also recorded and produced other legendary artists through his company Racer-Ex Productions, including Earth Wind and Fire, The Isley Brothers, The Jacksons, and the late Robert Palmer (see Artists Worked With).

== Music direction and performance ==
Through the years Salas has continued to use his expertise in musical direction and as a keyboardist, and playing keyboards on two of singer Robert Palmer's major tours in the late 1980s as well as music-directing three Janet Jackson world tours, including Jackson's 1998 HBO TV special: The Velvet Rope: Live in Madison Square Garden, for which Salas was nominated for an Emmy award in the category Outstanding Music Direction for a TV show. Salas was also the musical director for TLC's final “Fanmail Tour” as well as director for headlining tours with Maxwell, Brandy, Sheena Easton and Brian McKnight.

In 2009, Salas worked with The New York Symphonic Ensemble's 37 piece orchestra on a live tour with Boyz II Men in Japan. In 2010 the show was released on CD via iTunes Japan.

== Charity work ==
In 2009, Rex musical-directed a show for Justin Timberlake at Elton John's Aids Charity benefit in London, England, and he also worked with Timberlake on his first Shriners Hospitals for Children benefit in Las Vegas, Nevada, in 2008, at which Salas was musical director for guest artists Lionel Richie, Rihanna, will.i.am, Leona Lewis, 50 Cent, Boyz II Men and Adam Levine, the lead singer of Maroon 5.

On July 25, 2005, Rex and wife Stacee Brown (daughter of Rebbie Jackson) welcomed their son, London Blue Salas.

== Other interests ==
Salas is on the Faculty of the California College of Music in Pasadena, California.

== Discography ==
=== Albums ===
1983 : Tease – Tease (keyboards and songwriting on various songs)
1986 : Tease (second album) – Tease (songwriting on various songs)
1988 : Remember – Tease (songwriting on various songs including the title track)
1988 : Heavy Nova – Robert Palmer (keyboards on Simply Irresistible)
1988 : The Right Stuff – Vanessa Williams (producer on six songs

=== Singles/Tracks ===
1984: Fine Fine Fella – Patti Austin (keyboards)
1985 : If Your Heart Isn't In It – Atlantic Starr (keyboards)
1985 : You Never Know When You're Gonna Fall in Love – The Isley Brothers (songwriter)
1989 : You Only Come Out at Night – George Howard (keyboards/producer/songwriter)
1989 : All of My Love – The Gap Band (keyboards)
1990: Finishing Touch – Klymaxx (producer)
1990 : Just Want to Hold You – Jasmine Guy (producer)
1991 : The Comfort Zone – Vanessa Williams (keyboards)
1993 : It's So Hard to Say Goodbye to Yesterday – Boyz II Men (co-producer)
1993 : Al Final Del Camino (End of the Road) – Boyz II Men
1993 : Two Hearts – Earth, Wind and Fire (bass, keyboards, drum programming)
1994 : Separate Ways – Lalah Hathaway (keyboards)
1995 : Misused – The Mac Band (co-writer)
1996 : If Your Heart Isn't In It – Atlantic Starr (keyboards)

== Artists worked with ==
Salas has produced, written, arranged, played on albums and tracks by or performed with the following singers and groups:

- 50 Cent
- Tatyana Ali
- All-4-One
- Boyz II Men
- Mariah Carey
- JC Chasez
- Cher
- Dazz Band
- Taylor Dayne
- Earth, Wind & Fire
- The Gap Band
- Johnny Gill
- Jasmine Guy
- George Howard (jazz)
- Miki Howard
- The Isley Brothers
- The Jackson 5
- Janet Jackson
- 3T
- Paul Jackson Jr.
- Rebbie Jackson
- Joyce Kennedy
- Klymaxx
- Gladys Knight
- Lakeside (band)
- Adam Levine
- Leona Lewis
- Chandy Madd
- Brian McKnight
- Maxwell (musician)
- The Mac Band
- Robert Palmer (singer)
- Lionel Richie
- Patrice Rushen
- Atlantic Starr
- Jessica Simpson
- Nicole Scherzinger
- Robin Thicke
- Justin Timberlake
- UB40
- Will.i.am
- Vanessa Williams
- Stevie Wonder
- Lenny Williams
- Barbara Weathers
- Aly & AJ
- Durell Coleman
- Brian Simpson
- Vesta Williams
- Level 42
- Sheena Easton
