= The Right Stuff (Vanessa Williams song) =

1988 single by Vanessa Williams

Single by Vanessa Williams

from the album The Right Stuff
- Released: January 27, 1988
- Recorded: 1987
- Studio: Jam Power (Los Angeles) (Note: Basic tracks and overdubs); O'Henry Sound (Burbank, California) (Note: Overdubs)
- Genre: Dance-pop; new jack swing; R&B
- Length: 4:18
- Label: Wing
- Songwriters: Rex Salas; Kipper Jones
- Producer: Rex Salas

Vanessa Williams singles chronology
"The Right Stuff" (1988)	"(He's Got) The Look" (1988)

Music video
- "The Right Stuff" on YouTube

"The Right Stuff" is a song by American singer and actress Vanessa Williams, released as the first single from her 1988 debut studio album of the same name. The crossover single was very successful and became a top-five hit on the US Billboard Hot R&B/Hip-Hop Songs chart, as well as making the Billboard Hot 100. "The Right Stuff" also went to number one on the Billboard Dance Club Songs chart for one week. It peaked at number 71 on the UK Singles Chart and re-entered the charts in 1989, this time peaking at number 62 with a remixed version. At the 31st Grammy Awards in 1989, the song received a Grammy Award nomination for Best Female R&B Vocal Performance but lost to Anita Baker's "Giving You The Best That I Got".

== Critical reception ==
Pan-European magazine Music & Media picked "The Right Stuff" as Single of the Week. They wrote, "Excellent dance-pop/new jack swing/R&B mixture from this hot new artist, or Miss America in 1983. The groove has a definite Jam/Lewis much, but with the dry synthesized percussion and the effective use of vocals and sampling, the overall atmosphere is irresistible and bound for the clubs."

== Music video ==
The accompanying video for "The Right Stuff" was filmed in Baton Rouge and New Orleans.

== Track listing and formats ==
- CD single
1. "The Right Stuff" (Extended Version) – 5:37
2. "The Right Stuff" (Radio Version) – 4:15
3. "The Right Stuff" (Dub-A-Delic) – 5:43
- 12" vinyl maxi

A1. "The Right Stuff" (Radio Version) – 4:15
A2. "The Right Stuff" (Extended Version) – 5:37
B1. "The Right Stuff" (Edited Version) – 3:51
B2. "The Right Stuff" (Dub-A-Delic) – 5:43

== Usage in media ==
The song was featured in "The Queen Who Mopped Christmas", the premiere of the third season of RuPaul's Drag Race, being performed by contestants Venus D-Lite and Shangela in a "lipsync for your life". It was featured again in the eighth episode of the fifteenth season in the second round of the "Lip Sync LaLaPaRuZa Smackdown" episode, being performed by contestants Luxx Noir London, Anetra and Jax.

== Charts ==
=== Weekly charts ===
1988 weekly chart performance for "The Right Stuff"
Chart (1988)	Peak position
Belgium (Ultratop 50 Flanders)	15
Netherlands (Dutch Top 40)	11
Netherlands (Single Top 100)	21
UK Singles (OCC)	71
US Billboard Hot 100	44
US Dance Club Songs (Billboard)	1
US Dance Singles Sales (Billboard)	1
US Hot R&B/Hip-Hop Songs (Billboard)	4
US Cash Box Top 100 Singles	59
US Top Black Contemporary Singles (Cash Box)	3

1989 weekly chart performance for "The Right Stuff"
Chart (1989)	Peak position
UK Singles (OCC)	62

=== Year-end charts ===
Year-end chart performance for "The Right Stuff"
Chart (1988)	Position
Netherlands (Dutch Top 40)	87
US Dance Club Songs (Billboard)	41
US Dance Singles Sales (Billboard)	19
US Hot R&B/Hip-Hop Songs (Billboard)	69
