= Vanessa Williams =

American singer, actress and 1984 Miss America (born 1963)

- Williams in 2026
- Born: Vanessa Lynn Williams; March 18, 1963 (age 63); Tarrytown, New York, U.S.
- Education: Syracuse University (BFA)
- Occupations: Singer; actress; model; producer; dancer
- Years active: 1979–present
- Title: Miss Syracuse 1983; Miss New York 1983; Miss America 1984 (Winner; resigned)
- Term: Miss America: September 17, 1983 – July 23, 1984 (resigned)
- Predecessor: Debra Maffett
- Successor: Suzette Charles
- Spouses: Ramon Hervey II (m. 1987; div. 1997) Rick Fox (m. 1999; div. 2004) Jim Skrip (m. 2015; div. 2021)
- Children: 4, including Jillian Hervey
- Relatives: Chris Williams (brother)
- Awards: Full list
- Musical career
- Genres: R&B; pop; soul; jazz; dance; gospel
- Labels: Wing; Polydor; Mercury; Mellian Music; Lava; Concord
- Website: vanessawilliams.com

Vanessa Lynn Williams (born March 18, 1963) is an American singer, actress, model, producer and dancer. She gained recognition as the first Black woman to win the Miss America title when she was crowned Miss America 1984. She would later resign her title amid a media controversy surrounding nude photographs published in Penthouse magazine. Thirty-two years later, Williams was offered a public apology during the Miss America 2016 pageant for the events.

Williams rebounded from the scandal with a successful career as a singer and actress. In 1988, she released her debut studio album The Right Stuff, whose title single saw moderate success as well as "Dreamin'", which peaked at number 8 on the Billboard Hot 100 in the United States in 1989. With her second and third studio albums, The Comfort Zone (1991) and The Sweetest Days (1994), she saw continued commercial success and received multiple Grammy Award nominations, including her number-one single and signature song, "Save the Best for Last", which she performed live at the 1993 Grammy Awards ceremonies. Her later studio albums include Everlasting Love (2005), The Real Thing (2009), and Survivor (2024).

As an actress, Williams enjoyed success on stage and screen. She made her Broadway debut in 1994 with Kiss of the Spider Woman. In 2002, she starred as The Witch in the revival of Stephen Sondheim's Into the Woods that earned her a nomination for the Tony Award for Best Actress in a Musical at the 56th Tony Awards. She starred in the revival of Horton Foote's The Trip to Bountiful in 2013, and the ensemble political farce POTUS: Or, Behind Every Great Dumbass Are Seven Women Trying to Keep Him Alive in 2022. In television, Williams has played Wilhelmina Slater on Ugly Betty (2006–2010) for which she was nominated three times for the Primetime Emmy Award for Outstanding Supporting Actress in a Comedy Series; and Renee Perry on Desperate Housewives (2010–2012). From 2024 to 2026, she starred as Miranda Priestly in the musical The Devil Wears Prada at the Dominion Theatre, London.

== Early life and education ==
Vanessa Lynn Williams was born on March 18, 1963, in Tarrytown, New York, a suburb of New York City. She had a birth announcement that read: "Here she is: Miss America". She was raised nearby in Millwood, New York. A paternal great-great-grandfather was William Feilds, an African-American legislator in the Tennessee House of Representatives. Williams is also of English, Welsh, Irish, Finnish, Italian, and Portuguese descent. Her mother Helen Tinch (1939–2024) met her father Milton Augustine Williams Jr. (1934–2006) while both were music education students at Fredonia State Teachers College in the late 1950s. They became elementary school music teachers in separate districts after marriage. Milton also served as the assistant principal of his school for an extended period of time.

Williams was raised Catholic, the religion of her father. Her mother, who had been raised Baptist, converted to Catholicism when she married. Williams was baptized at Our Lady of Grace Church in the Bronx. Her mother played the organ at St. Theresa's Church in Briarcliff Manor for weddings and at Mass, and Williams used to assist her mother by turning the pages of sheet music.

Williams and her younger brother Chris Williams, who later became an actor, grew up in Westchester County, a predominantly white middle-to-upper-class suburb of New York City. Williams believes she may have been the first African-American student to go from the first grade to the 12th grade in the Chappaqua Central School District. She attended Robert E. Bell Middle School, as did her children years later. Williams revealed that the shop and home economics teachers, Mr. and Mrs. Fink, were still there when her children attended.

A child of music teachers, Williams grew up in a musical household, studying classical and jazz dance, French horn, piano, and violin. She was offered the Presidential Scholarship for Drama to attend Carnegie Mellon University during the college application period, one of 12 students to receive it, but decided instead to attend Syracuse University on a different scholarship. In 1981, Williams joined Syracuse's College of Visual and Performing Arts, Department of Drama as a musical theater major. She stayed at Syracuse through her second year until she was crowned Miss America 1984 in September 1983.

In May 2008, Syracuse granted Williams a Bachelor of Fine Arts degree. According to Syracuse News, "Williams earned the remaining credits for her degree through industry experience and her substantial performances on stage and screen." Williams delivered the 2008 convocation address, telling Syracuse seniors to "treasure this moment. These days are irreplaceable and are the beginning of the rest of your life."

== Name misattribution ==
Williams is most often publicly recognized simply as "Vanessa Williams." There is occasional confusion with the similarly named actress Vanessa E. Williams. It has been reported that Vanessa L. became aware of Vanessa E. in the 1980s when the New York University registrar told her that another, similarly aged student with the same name and from the same state had applied. When Williams appeared as Miss America in a Macy's Thanksgiving Day Parade, Vanessa E. accidentally received her cheque for the appearance, which she returned.

In the area of acting, the two ran into name conflict when Screen Actors Guild rules prohibited duplicate stage naming. Vanessa E. had registered the name "Vanessa Williams" first, so as a compromise, Williams was occasionally credited as "Vanessa L. Williams" in acting credits. To compound the confusion, both actresses starred in versions of the drama Soul Food, Williams in the film version, and Vanessa E. in its TV series adaptation. The Screen Actors Guild eventually took the issue to arbitration, and decided both actresses could use the professional name "Vanessa Williams".

== Miss America ==
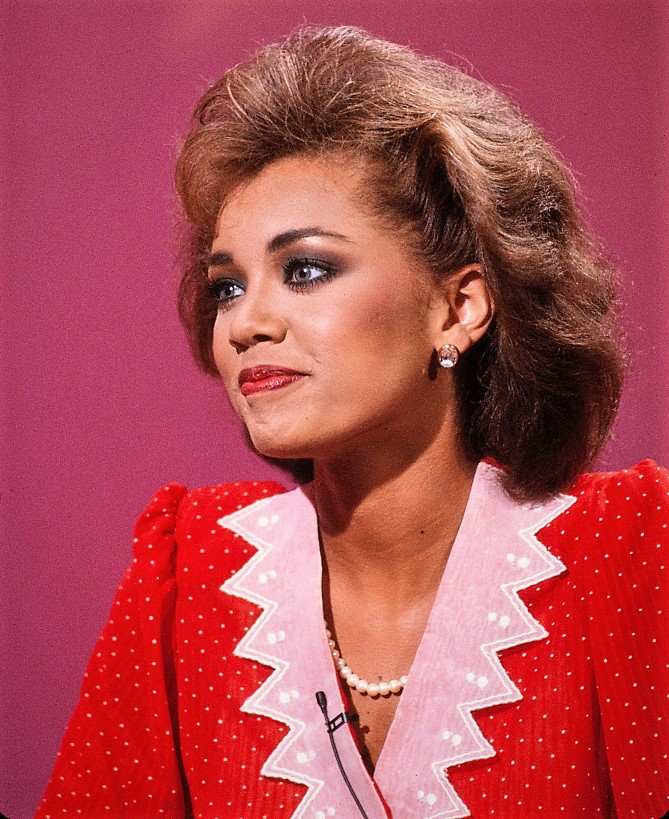
Williams in 1984

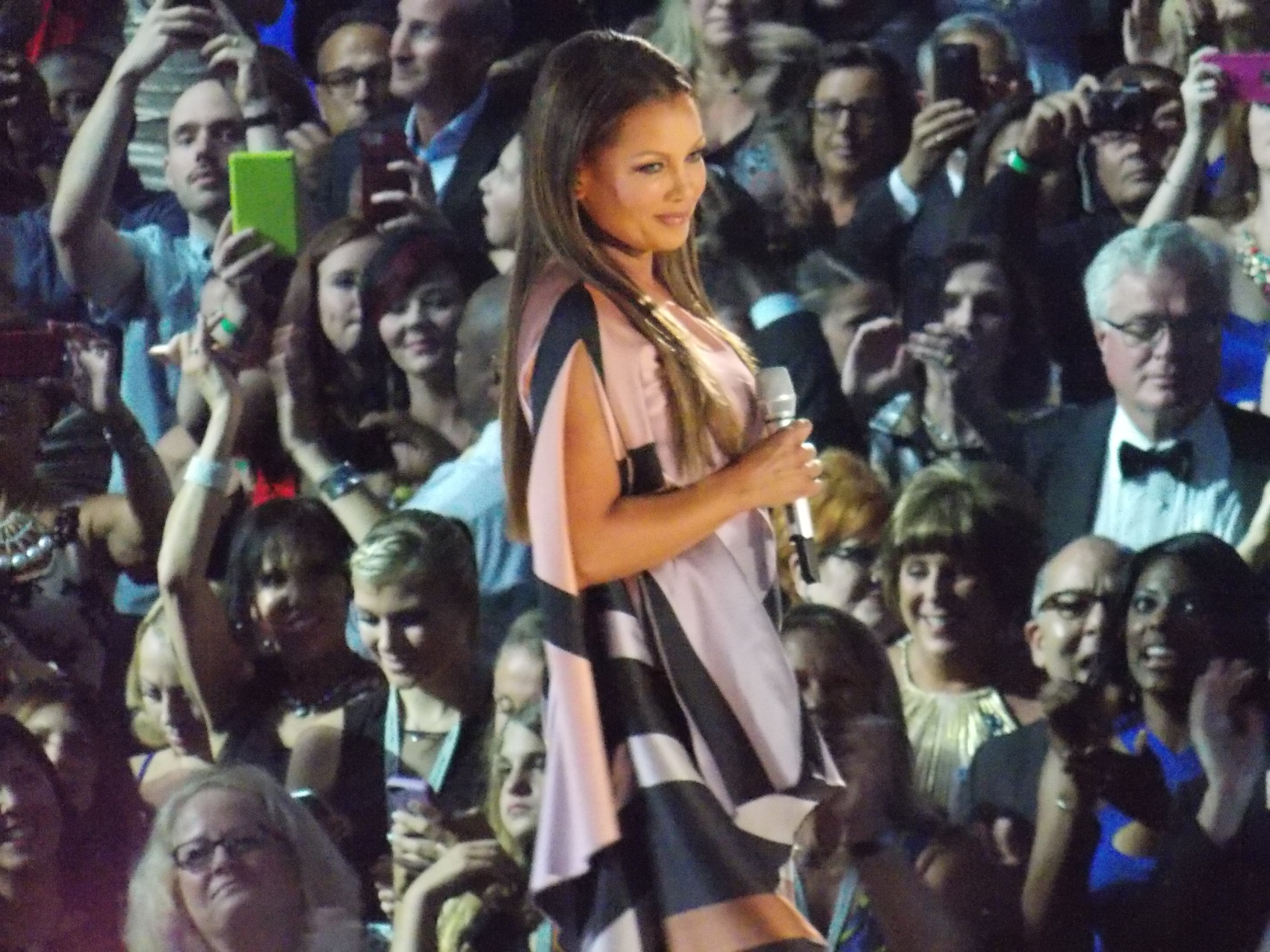
Williams at the conclusion of her performance of "Oh how the Years Go By" at Miss America 2016

Williams was the first African-American recipient of the Miss America title when she was crowned Miss America 1984 on September 17, 1983. Several weeks before the end of her reign, a scandal arose when Penthouse magazine bought nude photographs of her and published them without Williams' consent. In the summer of '82 she also posed for another photographer, Greg Whitman, who sent a telegram to Bob Guccione offering more nude photographs of Williams, after he heard photographer Tom Chiapel's pictures had been sold to Penthouse. The photographer said in an interview that she signed a release on the pictures. Williams claimed, ''people wouldn't forgive a second mistake.'' Williams was pressured to relinquish her title in July 1984 and was succeeded by the first runner-up: Miss New Jersey 1983 Suzette Charles.

Thirty-two years later in September 2015, when Williams served as head judge for the Miss America 2016 pageant, former Miss America CEO Sam Haskell made a public apology to her for the events of 1984.

== Career ==
=== Music ===
Williams first received public recognition for her musical abilities when she won the preliminary talent portion of the Miss America pageant with her rendition of "Happy Days Are Here Again" (Williams would later be crowned Miss America 1984). Four years later in 1988, Williams released her debut album, The Right Stuff. The first single, "The Right Stuff", found success on the R&B chart, while the second single, "He's Got the Look", found similar success on the same chart. The third single, "Dreamin'", was a pop hit, becoming Williams' first top 10 hit on the 1989 Billboard Hot 100, peaking at No. 8, and her first number one single on the Hot R&B/Hip-Hop Songs chart. The album reached gold status in the U.S. and earned her an NAACP Image Award for Outstanding New Artist and three Grammy Award nominations, including one for Best New Artist at the 31st Grammy Awards.

Her 1991 second album The Comfort Zone became the biggest success in her music career. The lead single "Running Back to You" reached top twenty on the Hot 100, and the top position of Hot R&B/Hip-Hop Songs chart on October 5, 1991. Other singles included "The Comfort Zone" (number 2 R&B), "Just for Tonight" (number 26 Pop), a cover of The Isley Brothers' "Work to Do" (number 3 R&B), and the club-only hit "Freedom Dance (Get Free!)".

The most successful single from the album, as well as her biggest hit to date, is "Save the Best for Last". It reached No. 1 in the United States, where it remained for five weeks, as well as No. 1 in Australia, the Netherlands, and Canada, and was in the top 5 in Japan, on the Irish Singles Chart and the UK singles chart. The album sold 2.2 million copies in the U.S. at its time of release and has since been certified triple platinum in the United States by the RIAA, gold in Canada by the CRIA, and platinum in the United Kingdom by the BPI. Williams performed the song live at the 1993 Grammy Awards. The Comfort Zone earned Williams five Grammy Award nominations.

The Sweetest Days, her third album, was released in 1994 to highly favorable reviews. The album saw Williams branch out and sample other styles of music that included jazz, hip hop, rock, and Latin-themed recordings such as "Betcha Never" and "You Can't Run", both written and produced by Babyface. Other singles from the album included the adult-contemporary and dance hit "The Way That You Love" and the title track. The album was certified platinum in the U.S. by the RIAA and earned her two Grammy Award nominations.

Other releases include two Christmas albums, Star Bright in 1996, and Silver & Gold in 2004, as well as Next in 1997, Everlasting Love in 2005, and The Real Thing in 2009, along with Greatest Hits: The First Ten Years, a greatest hits compilation released in 1998, and a number of other compilations released over the years. Chart performances from subsequent albums, motion picture and television soundtracks have included the songs "Love Is", which was a duet with Brian McKnight, the Golden Globe- and Academy Award-winning "Colors of the Wind", "Where Do We Go from Here?", and "Oh How the Years Go By".

In 1996, Williams performed the national anthem at Super Bowl XXX.

In April 2018, she announced she was working on a new studio album due in the fall that would incorporate her R&B, pop, & Broadway influences.

On April 26, 2024, Williams released a new single, "Legs (Keep Dancing)", the first from her ninth studio album, Survivor, which was released on August 23, 2024. Williams launched her own record label, Mellian Music, for the release. On May 13, 2024, the digital single "Legs (Keep Dancing)" debuted on the US Dance/Electronic Digital Song Sales (Billboard) chart in the number 3 position. The single's success marks Williams' first hit on the Dance/Electronic Digital Song Sales chart. In July 2024, Williams released the single "Bop!", a collaboration with Trixie Mattel and Lion Babe.

Vanessa Williams has surpassed 250 million total streams on Spotify across all credits. She averages nearly 190K daily listeners on the platform.

=== Television and film ===
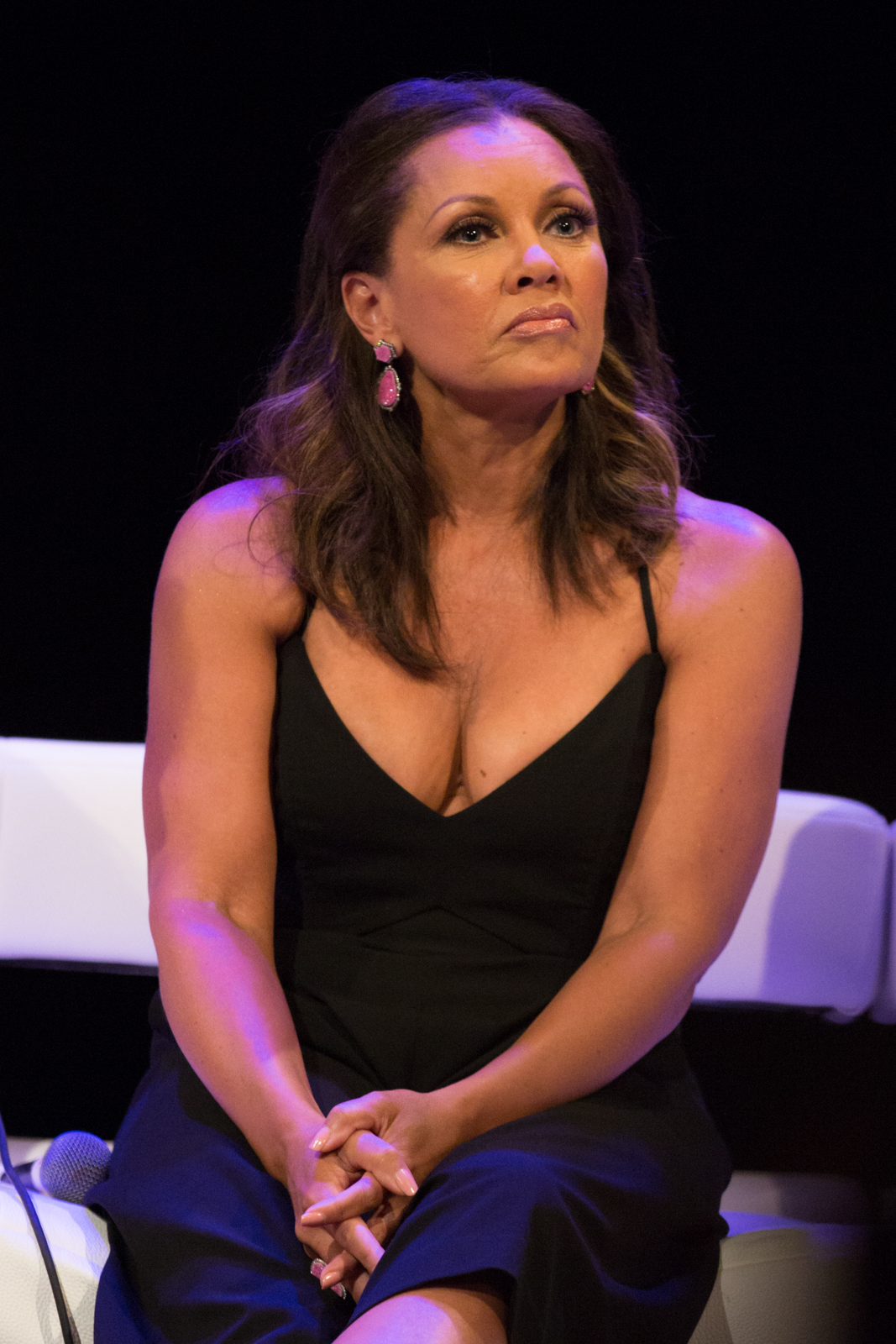
Williams in 2016

Williams has had a successful career in television. Her first television appearance was on a 1984 episode of The Love Boat followed by guest appearances in a number of popular shows. In 1995, Williams starred as Rose Alvarez in a television adaptation of the 1960 Broadway musical Bye Bye Birdie and portrayed the nymph Calypso in the 1997 Hallmark Entertainment miniseries The Odyssey. In 2000, Williams starred in the Lifetime film about the life of Henriette DeLille, The Courage to Love and in 2003, Williams read the narrative of Tempie Herndon Durham from the WPA slave narratives in the HBO documentary Unchained Memories: Readings from the Slave Narratives.

In 2006, Williams received considerable media attention for her comic/villainess role as former model/magazine creative director turned editor-in-chief Wilhelmina Slater in the ABC comedy series Ugly Betty. Her performance on the series resulted in a nomination for the Primetime Emmy Award for Outstanding Supporting Actress in a Comedy Series at the 59th Primetime Emmy Awards with additional nominations in 2008 and 2009. Williams next joined the cast of Desperate Housewives for its seventh season, where she portrayed Renee Perry, an old college "frenemy" of Lynette Scavo (Felicity Huffman). In 2016, she joined the cast of The Librarians, as recurring villainess General Cynthia Rockwell. She starred as Maxine Robinson in the VH1 television series Daytime Divas during its one season in 2017.

Williams has appeared in a number of feature films. She received an NAACP Image Award for Outstanding Actress in a Motion Picture for her portrayal of Teri Joseph for the 1997 feature film Soul Food. In 2007, she starred in the independent film My Brother, for which she won Best Actress honors at the Harlem International Film Festival, the African-American Women in Cinema Film Festival, and at the Santa Barbara African Heritage Film Festival. She also notably co-starred with Arnold Schwarzenegger in the 1996 film Eraser, Samuel L. Jackson in the 2000 soft reboot of Shaft, the characters from Sesame Street in the 1999 film The Adventures of Elmo in Grouchland, as the Queen of Trash, and with Miley Cyrus in the 2009 film Hannah Montana: The Movie.

=== Theatre ===
Williams began her career on stage in the 1985 production, One Man Band, as one of "the women". She followed it in 1989 as Laura in Ron Milner's Checkmates.

In 1994, she broadened her ascendant music career into a theatrical role when she replaced Chita Rivera as Aurora in the Broadway production of Kiss of the Spider Woman. In 1998, she portrayed Della Green in the revival of St. Louis Woman, and Carmen Jones in the 2002 Kennedy Center Special Performance of Carmen Jones. In the same year, she was also featured in the Tony and Drama Desk Award-winning revival production of Stephen Sondheim's Into the Woods, for which she was nominated for a Tony Award for Best Actress in a Musical at the 56th Tony Awards and a Drama Desk Award for Outstanding Actress in a Musical for her performance as the Witch. This production included songs revised for her.

In 2010, Vanessa starred in a new Broadway musical revue entitled Sondheim on Sondheim, a look at Stephen Sondheim through his music, film and videotaped interviews. Sondheim ran from March 19 to June 13 at Studio 54 in New York City. In 2013, she starred as Jessie Mae Watts in the Horton Foote play The Trip to Bountiful, which was later turned into a 2014 television film. In 2014, she starred in the Broadway musical, After Midnight and in 2015, she appeared in a PBS production of Show Boat as Julie La Verne. Williams starred as Margaret in POTUS: Or, Behind Every Great Dumbass Are Seven Women Trying to Keep Him Alive on Broadway, with performances that began on April 14, 2022, at the Shubert Theatre. Wi

In February, 2024 Williams was cast to play the role of Miranda Priestly, in a stage production of the Devil Wears Prada at the Dominion Theatre in London's West End.

=== Additional roles ===
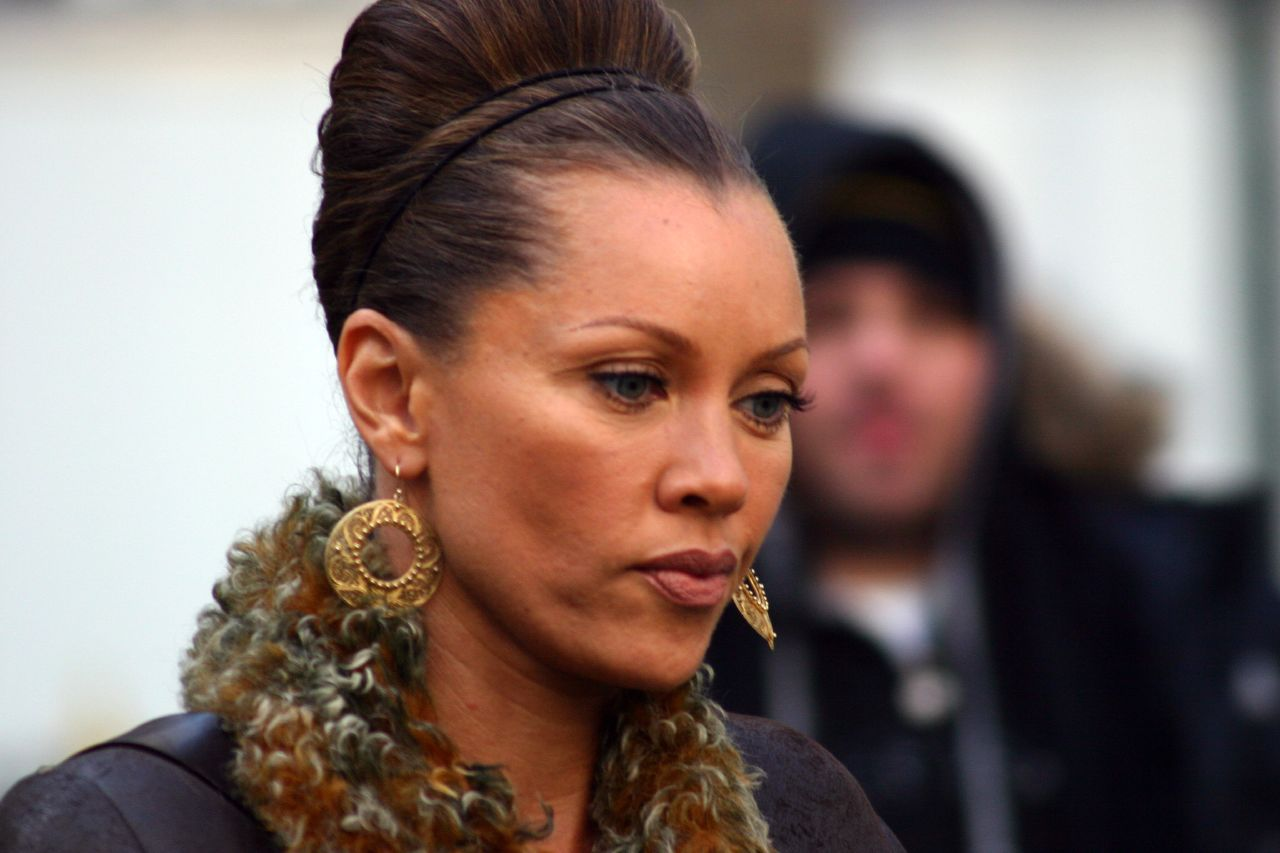
Williams at the 2007 Mercedes-Benz Fashion Week in New York City

Williams served as the host of the 1994 Essence Awards, co-host of Carnegie Hall Salutes the Jazz Masters: Verve Records at 50, host of the 1998 NAACP Image Awards, host of the 2002 documentary, It's Black Entertainment, host of The 6th Annual TV Land Awards in 2007, host of the 36th Annual Daytime Emmy Awards in 2009, and host of the documentary Dreams Come True: A Celebration of Disney Animation in 2009.

Williams is a spokesmodel for Proactiv Solution, and was the first African-American spokesmodel for L'Oréal cosmetics in the 1990s. In 2018, Williams returned as a spokesmodel for L'Oréal as part of their "Age Perfect" campaign alongside fellow ambassadors Helen Mirren, Julianne Moore, and Jane Fonda. In 2000, she appeared on Who Wants to Be a Millionaire as a contestant, and again in August 2009, as a celebrity guest during the show's tenth anniversary prime-time special editions, winning $50,000 for her charity.

In a commercial that began running during Super Bowl XLVI in 2012, Williams voiced the new character Ms. Brown, a brown M&M.

In 2020, Williams was the winner of season 1, episode 2 of RuPaul's Secret Celebrity Drag Race, and donated her prize of $20,000 to the LGBTQ charity The Trevor Project.

=== Fashion ===
In March 2016, Williams launched her own clothing line, V. by Vanessa Williams, for EVINE Live.

== Personal life ==
Williams and her mother Helen co-authored a memoir titled You Have No Idea, published in April 2012. In the book, Williams discusses her childhood, rise to fame, and personal struggles, including life with type 1 diabetes and that she was sexually molested by a woman when she was ten years old. She spoke candidly about having an abortion while she was in high school.

Williams is a practicing Catholic, something she spoke about on the ABC News program Focus on Faith with Father Edward L. Beck.

Williams has been married three times. She married Ramon Hervey II at St. Francis Xavier Catholic Church in 1987, just a few years after giving up her Miss America crown and gave birth to her first child at that time. Hervey was a public relations specialist who was hired to resuscitate her career after her resignation. They had three children, including Jillian. They divorced in 1997.

She married NBA basketball player Rick Fox in 1999. They had one daughter, Sasha Gabriella Fox. They divorced in 2004. In 2015, she married Jim Skrip, a businessman from Buffalo, New York, at St. Stanislaus Catholic Church, after receiving a Church annulment of her first marriage. The couple divorced in 2021.

In 2013, she was in an episode of Who Do You Think You Are? to learn about her background. According to the DNA test results, she is 23% Ghanaian, 17% British, 15% Cameroonian, 12% Finnish, 11% Southern European, 7% Togolese, 6% Beninese, 5% Senegalese and 4% Portuguese.

== Activism ==
Williams is involved with several humanitarian causes. In 2011, participated in the human rights campaign New Yorkers for Marriage Equality. She currently sits on the board of The Sheen Center for Thought and Culture, a creative arts space run by the Catholic Archdiocese. She is partnered with Dress For Success, an organization that provides professional attire for low-income women seeking employment. Williams is also involved with The San Miquel Academy of Newburgh, a school for boys at risk.

== Honors and awards ==
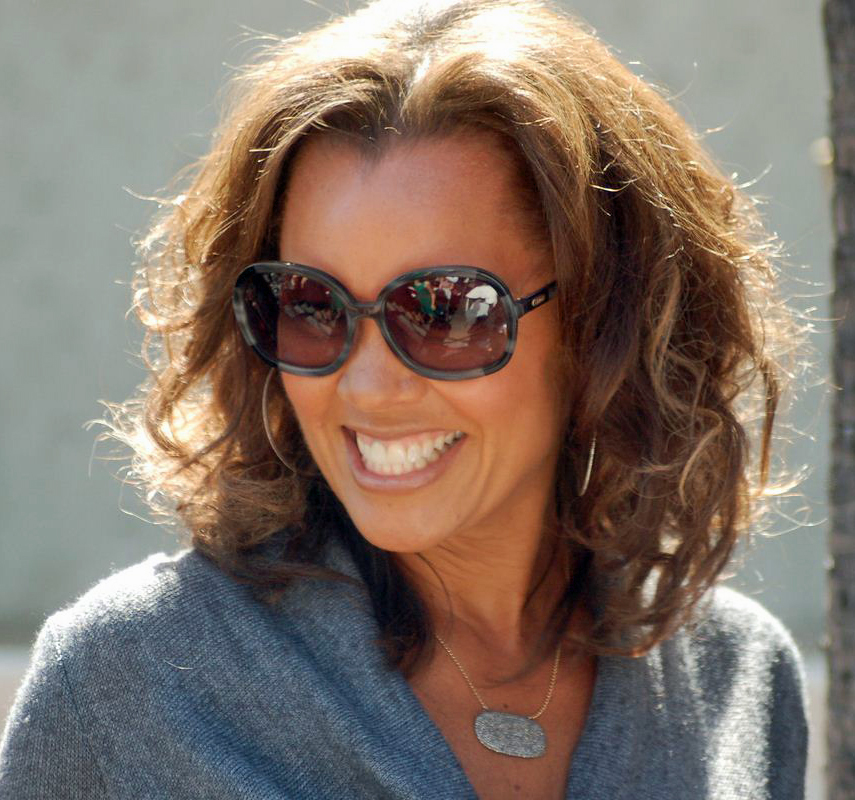
Williams in 2012

Williams is the recipient of many awards and nominations including eleven Grammy nominations for hits such as "The Right Stuff", "Save the Best for Last", and "Colors of the Wind". In addition, she has earned three Emmy nominations, a Tony Award nomination, seven NAACP Image Awards, and four Satellite Awards.

She received a star on the Hollywood Walk of Fame on March 19, 2007.

In December 2017, Vanessa L. Williams participated at COAF Gala fundraising event, delivering a special performance of her Golden Globe and Academy Award-winning song "Colors of the Wind" and paid tribute to Patricia Field, with whom she worked on the set of the TV series Ugly Betty.

== Discography ==
=== Studio albums ===
- The Right Stuff (1988)
- The Comfort Zone (1991)
- The Sweetest Days (1994)
- Star Bright (1996)
- Next (1997)
- Silver & Gold (2004)
- Everlasting Love (2005)
- The Real Thing (2009)
- Survivor (2024)

== Filmography ==
=== Film ===
Year	Title	Role	Notes
1987	The Pick-up Artist	Rae	
1988	Under the Gun	Samantha Richards	
1989	Full Exposure: The Sex Tapes Scandal	Valentine Hayward	Television film
1990	Perry Mason: The Case of the Silenced Singer	Terri Knight	Television film
1990	Seriously...Phil Collins	Rachel	Television film
1990	The Kid Who Loved Christmas	Lynette Parks	Television film
1991	Another You	Gloria	
1991	Harley Davidson and the Marlboro Man	Lulu Daniels	
1992	Stompin' at the Savoy	Pauline	Television film
1995	Nothing Lasts Forever	Dr. Kathy "Kat" Hunter	Television film
1995	Bye Bye Birdie	Rose Alvarez	Television film
1996	Eraser	Dr. Lee Cullen	
1997	Soul Food	Teri Joseph	
1997	Hoodlum	Francine Hughes	
1997	Odyssey	Calypso	
1998	Dance with Me	Ruby Sinclair	
1998	Futuresport	Alejandra "Alex" Torres	Television film
1999	The Adventures of Elmo in Grouchland	Queen of Trash	
1999	Light It Up	Detective Audrey McDonald	
2000	The Courage to Love	Mother Henriette DeLille	Television film
2000	Don Quixote	Dulcinea del Toboso/Aldonza Lorenzo	Television film
2000	Shaft	Carmen Vasquez	
2000	A Diva's Christmas Carol	Ebony Scrooge	Television film
2001	WW3	M.J. Blake	Television film
2001	Santa, Baby!	Alicia	Voice, television film
2002	Keep the Faith, Baby	Hazel Scott	Television film
2004	Johnson Family Vacation	Dorothy Johnson	
2004	Beck and Call	Zoe	Short film
2006	Rehearsing a Dream	Herself	Short film
2006	My Brother	L'Tisha Morton	
2007	And Then Came Love	Julie Davidson	Also executive producer
2009	Hannah Montana: The Movie	Vita	
2011	Delhi Safari	Beggum	Voice
2013	He's Way More Famous Than You	Herself	
2013	Temptation: Confessions of a Marriage Counselor	Janice	
2014	The Trip to Bountiful	Jessie Mae Watts	Television film
2014	When Marnie Was There	Hisako	Voice
2017	The Man from Earth: Holocene	Carolyn	
2018	Suicide Squad: Hell to Pay	Amanda Waller	Voice
2018	The Legend of Hallowaiian	Fire Goddess	Voice
2018	False Profits	Suzanne	Television film
2019	Batman: Hush	Amanda Waller	Voice
2019	Miss Virginia	Sally Ray	
2020	Bad Hair	Zora Choice	
2023	Tripped Up	Patty	

=== Television ===
Year	Title	Role	Notes
1979	Live from Lincoln Center	Graduates/Off Stage Voices	Episode: "New York City Opera: Street Scene"
1984	Partners in Crime	Roselle Robins	Episode: "Celebrity"
1984–1986	The Love Boat	Miss America/Pearl	2 episodes
1986	He's the Mayor	Herself	Episode: "An Officer and the Mayor"
1986	The Redd Foxx Show	Jessica	Episode: "The Prodigal Son"
1986	T.J. Hooker	Officer Pat Williamson	Episode: "Partners in Death"
1992	The Jacksons: An American Dream	Suzanne de Passe	2 episodes
1992	The Fresh Prince of Bel-Air	Danny Mitchell	Episode: "A Funny Thing Happened on the Way Home from the Forum"
1992–1998	Saturday Night Live	Herself	2 episodes
1994	Great Performances	Herself/Host	Episode: "Carnegie Hall Salutes the Jazz Masters: Verve Records at 50"
1995	Happily Ever After: Fairy Tales for Every Child	Beauty	Voice, episode: "Beauty and the Beast"
1996	Star Trek: Deep Space Nine	Arandis	Episode: "Let He Who Is Without Sin..."
1997	The Odyssey	Calypso	2 episodes
1999	I'll Make Me a World	Herself/Narrator	6 episodes
1999	L.A. Doctors	Dr. Leanne Barrows	3 episodes
2000	Sesame Street	Herself	Episode: "Dancing on Sesame Street"
2002	Ally McBeal	Sheila Hunt	Episode: "Another One Bites the Dust"
2002	The Proud Family	Debra Williams	Voice, episode: "Ain't Nothing Like the Real Thingy, Baby"
2003	Boomtown	Detective Katherine Pierce	6 episodes
2004	Mad TV	Herself	Episode: "Episode 9.20"
2006	South Beach	Elizabeth Bauer	Main cast (8 episodes)
2006–2010	Ugly Betty	Wilhelmina Slater	Main cast (85 episodes)
2007	Shear Genius	Herself/Celebrity Judge	2 episodes
2007–2008	Mama Mirabelle's Home Movies	Mama Mirabelle	US voice, main role (33 episodes)
2010	The A-List: New York	Herself	Episode: "To the Sky"
2010–2012	Desperate Housewives	Renee Perry	Main role (46 episodes)
2011–2023	RuPaul's Drag Race	Herself/Guest Judge	3 episodes
2012	Kitchen Cousins	Herself	Episode: "Vanessa Williams Kitchen Surprise"
2012	Phineas and Ferb	Flight Attendant	Voice, episode: "Where's Perry? Part I"
2012–2013	666 Park Avenue	Olivia Doran	Main role (13 episodes)
2014	The Haunting Of...	Herself	Episode: "Vanessa Williams"
2015	The Mindy Project	Dr. Philips	Episode: "Danny Castellano Is My Nutritionist"
2015	Royal Pains	Olympia Houston	2 episodes
2015	The Good Wife	Courtney Paige	4 episodes
2015	Live from Lincoln Center	Julie La Verne	Episode: "Kern and Hammerstein's Show Boat"
2016	Broad City	Elizabeth Carlton	Episode: "Game Over"
2016–2017	The Librarians	General Cynthia Rockwell	4 episodes
2016–2018	Milo Murphy's Law	Dr. Eileen Underwood	Voice, 4 episodes
2017	Daytime Divas	Maxine Robinson	Main role (10 episodes)
2017	Difficult People	Trish	Episode: "Strike Rat"
2017	Modern Family	Rhonda	Episode: "The Long Goodbye"
2018	RuPaul's Drag Race: All Stars	Herself/Guest Judge	Episode: "Divas Lip Sync Live"
2018	Me, Myself & I	Kelly Frasier	3 episodes
2019	Project Runway All Stars	Herself/Guest Judge	Episode: "Penneys From Heaven"
2019	Doc McStuffins	Delilah	Voice, episode: "Adventures in Baby Land"
2019	First Wives Club	Nancy	Episode: "Something Blue"
2019–2022	T.O.T.S.	Captain Candace Beakman	Voice, main role (64 episodes)
2020	RuPaul's Secret Celebrity Drag Race	Herself/Vanqueisha De House	Episode: "Secret Celebrity Edition #102"
2020–2021	Twenties	Angela	3 episodes
2021	Kenan	Tasha Noble	Episode: "Hair Show"
2021	Marvel's Wastelanders: Star-Lord	Emma Frost	Voice, main role (10 episodes)
2021–2023	Queen of the Universe	Herself/Judge	Main role (14 episodes)
2021–2024	Girls5eva	Nance Trace	3 episodes
2022	Carpool Karaoke	Herself	Episode: "Hillary Clinton, Chelsea Clinton & Amber Ruffin"
2022	A Black Lady Sketch Show	Delilah	Episode: "It's a New Day, Africa America!"
2023	American Experience	Herself/Narrator	Episode: "Zora Neale Hurston: Claiming a Space"
2023	Great Performances	Herself	Episode: "Celebrating 50 Years of Broadway's Best"
2024	Velma	Dr. Perdue	Voice, 6 episodes
2024	Elsbeth	Rosalyn Bridwell	Episode: "Diamonds are for Elsbeth"

=== Theater ===
Year	Title	Role	Venue
1985	One Man Band	The Women	South Street Theatre, Off-Broadway
1988	Checkmates	Laura McClellan-Williams	Westwood Playhouse
1994	The Jazz Masters, Live from Carnegie Hall	Host/Performer	Carnegie Hall
1994	Kiss of the Spider Woman	Spider Woman/Aurora Replacement	Broadhurst Theatre, Broadway debut
1998	St. Louis Woman	Della Green	New York City Center, Off-Broadway
2001	Broadway Bash	Performer	New York City Center, Off-Broadway
2002	Into the Woods	The Witch	Ahmanson Theatre
2002	Into the Woods	The Witch	Broadhurst Theatre, Broadway
2002	Carmen Jones	Carmen Jones	Kennedy Center for the Performing Arts
2004	Silver & Gold	Herself/Performer	Palace Theatre, Broadway
2010	Sondheim on Sondheim	Performer	Studio 54, Broadway
2013	The Trip to Bountiful	Jessie Mae Watts	Stephen Sondheim Theatre, Broadway
2013	After Midnight	Special Guest Star	Brooks Atkinson Theatre, Broadway
2014	Show Boat	Julie La Verne	New York Philharmonic, Avery Fisher Hall
2018	Hey Look Me Over	Performer	New York City Center, Off-Broadway
2020	City of Angels	Carla Haywood/Alaura Kingsley	Garrick Theatre, West End
2022	Seth Rudetsky's Broadway Concert Series	Herself/Performer	Town Hall, Broadway
2022	Anyone Can Whistle	Cora Hoover Hooper	Carnegie Hall
2022	POTUS: Or, Behind Every Great Dumbass Are Seven Women Trying to Keep Him Alive	Margaret	Shubert Theatre, Broadway
2022	50 Years of Broadway at the Kennedy Center	Performer	Kennedy Center for the Performing Arts
2023	Gutenberg! The Musical!	Producer	James Earl Jones Theatre, Broadway
2024	KRISTIN: An Evening with Friends for Todd	Performer	Stephen Sondheim Theatre, Broadway
2024–2025	A Wonderful World	(Producer only)	Studio 54, Broadway
2024–2026	The Devil Wears Prada	Miranda Priestly	Theatre Royal, Plymouth (July–August 2024) and Dominion Theatre, West End (from October 2024)

=== Video games ===
Year	Title	Voice
1996	You Don't Know Jack Volume 2	Herself

== Books written ==
- Williams, Vanessa; Williams, Helen (2012). You Have No Idea: A Famous Daughter, Her No-Nonsense Mother, and How They Survived Pageants, Hollywood, Love, Loss (and Each Other). New York: Gotham Books. ISBN 978-1-5924-0759-0.
- Williams, Vanessa (2020). Bubble Kisses. New York: Sterling Children's Books. ISBN 978-1-4549-3834-7.

== See also ==
- List of artists who reached number one in the United States
- List of artists who reached number one on the U.S. Dance Club Songs chart
- Children of Armenia Fund

Awards and achievements
Preceded by Debra Maffett	Miss America; 1984	Succeeded by Suzette Charles
Preceded by Eileen Clark	Miss New York; 1983	Succeeded by Melissa Manning
