= The Right Stuff (album) =

1988 studio album by Vanessa Williams

Studio album by Vanessa Williams
- Released: June 6, 1988
- Studios: Jam Power (Los Angeles) (Note: Basic tracks and overdubs on tracks 1 and 7); O'Henry Sound (Burbank, California) (Note: Overdubs on tracks 1, 7 and 10; tracks 4 and 11); The Rock House (Los Angeles) (Note: Track 2); Westlake (West Hollywood, California) (Note: Track 2; Vanessa Williams' vocals and trombone solo on track 5); B&D (Los Angeles); Music Grinder (Hollywood, California); Sigma Sound (Philadelphia) (Note: Track 3); The Music Palace (West Hempstead, New York) (Note: Track 5); Countdown (Miami) (Note: Track 6); Ameraycan (North Hollywood, California) (Note: Overdubs on track 7); Ocean Way Recording (Los Angeles) (Note: Basic tracks on tracks 8 and 10); Smoke Tree (Chatsworth, California) (Note: Track 9); Red Zone (Burbank, California); Studio Masters (Los Angeles); WindSong Digital; Evergreen (Burbank, California) (Note: Overdubs on track 10)
- Genre: R&B
- Length: 49:54
- Label: Wing
- Producers: Amir Bayyan; David Paul Bryant; Lewis A. Martinee; Donald Robinson; Larry Robinson; Darryl Ross; Rex Salas

Vanessa Williams chronology
The Right Stuff (1988)	The Comfort Zone (1991)

Singles from The Right Stuff
- 1. "The Right Stuff" Released: February 1, 1988; 2. "(He's Got) The Look" Released: April 12, 1988; 3. "Dreamin'" Released: August 16, 1988; 4. "Darlin' I" Released: January 20, 1989

Professional ratings
Review scores
Source	Rating
AllMusic	4.5/5 stars

The Right Stuff is the debut studio album by American singer and actress Vanessa Williams. It was released on June 6, 1988 by Wing Records. It includes the singles "The Right Stuff", "(He's Got) The Look", "Dreamin'" and "Darlin' I". The album and its singles were well received by both the urban and pop markets. It was eventually certified Gold by the Recording Industry Association of America (RIAA) for sales in excess of 500,000 and earned Williams three Grammy Award nominations, including Best New Artist and Best Female R&B Vocal Performance for "The Right Stuff" at the 31st Annual Grammy Awards and Best Female R&B Vocal Performance for "Dreamin'" at the 32nd Annual Grammy Awards.

== Singles ==
The album's first and second singles, "The Right Stuff" and "(He's Got) The Look", hit the top 10 on Billboard's Hot R&B Songs chart; "The Right Stuff" peaked within the top five at number four, as well as number one on the US Dance Songs chart. The third single, "Dreamin'", was a pop hit, becoming Williams's first top 10 on the Billboard Hot 100, peaking at No. 8, and her first number one single on the Hot R&B/Hip-Hop Songs chart. "Darlin' I" was the fourth and final single, earning her a third top 10 R&B hit and top ten on the Hot Adult Contemporary chart.

== Track listing ==
No.	Title	Writer(s)	Producer(s)	Length
1.	"The Right Stuff"	Rex Salas; Kipper Jones	Salas	4:18
2.	"Be a Man"	Larry Robinson; Jones; Patrice Rushen	L. Robinson	4:57
3.	"Dreamin'"	Lisa Montgomery; Geneva Paschal	Donald Robinson	5:25
4.	"If You Really Love Him"	Salas; Chuckii Booker	Salas	5:24
5.	"(He's Got) The Look"	Adil Bayyan; Amir Bayyan; Wesley Thomas Jr.	Amir Bayyan	4:11
6.	"I'll Be the One"	Johnny Elkins; Mike Greene	Lewis A. Martineé	4:05
7.	"Security"	Salas; Jones	Salas	4:38
8.	"Darlin' I"	Salas; Kenny Harris	Salas	4:07
9.	"Am I Too Much?"	David Paul Bryant; Darryl Ross	Bryant; Ross	4:08
10.	"Can This Be Real?"	Dan Serafini	Salas	5:15
11.	"Whatever Happens"	Bill Withers; Larry Carlton	Salas	3:26

== Personnel ==
- Produced by Amir-Salaam Bayyan, David Paul Bryant, Lewis A. Martineé, Donald Robinson, Larry Robinson, Darryl Ross, Rex Salas
- Additional [background] vocals: Chuckii Booker, Johnny Gill (track 1), Niki Haris (tracks 2, 7, 10), Rachelle Ferrell (track 3), Kipper Jones (tracks 1, 2, 8)
- Engineers: Mike Bona, David Bianco, Gerry Brown, Craig Burbridge, Peter Dlugokencky, Michael Frenke, Lewis A. Martineé, Allen Scott Plotkin, Paul Scott, Steve Shepherd, Mike Tarsia, Steve Van Arden, Erik Zobler, Jared Held
- Assistant engineers: Sabrina Burchanek, Cliff Jones, Bob Loftus, Gill Morales, Adam Silverman, Dennis Stefani, John VanNest
- Mixing: Rick Alonso, David Bianco, Lewis A. Martineé, Donald Robinson, Mike Tarsia, Erik Zobler, Jared Held
- Remixing: Rod Hui
- Mix assistant: Steve Holroyd
- Editing and post-production: Ed Eckstine, Eric "Vietnam" Sadler, Christopher Shaw, Hank Shocklee, Bill Stephney

== Charts ==
=== Weekly charts ===
Weekly chart performance for The Right Stuff
Chart (1988)	Peak position
Dutch Albums (Album Top 100)	45
US Billboard 200	38
US Top R&B/Hip-Hop Albums (Billboard)	18

=== Year-end charts ===
1988 year-end chart performance for The Right Stuff
Chart (1988)	Position
US Top R&B/Hip-Hop Albums (Billboard)	66

1989 year-end chart performance for The Right Stuff
Chart (1989)	Position
US Top R&B/Hip-Hop Albums (Billboard)	32

== Certifications ==
Certifications for The Right Stuff
Region	Certification	Certified units/sales
United States (RIAA)	Gold	500,000^{^}
^{^} Shipments figures based on certification alone.
