= Dreamin' (Vanessa Williams song) =

1988 single by Vanessa Williams

Single by Vanessa Williams

from the album The Right Stuff
- B-side: "The Right Stuff (instrumental)"
- Released: August 16, 1988
- Recorded: 1986
- Studio: Sigma Sound, Philadelphia, Pennsylvania
- Genre: R&B; soul; smooth jazz
- Length: 5:25
- Label: Wing
- Songwriters: Lisa Montgomery; Geneva Paschal
- Producer: Donald Robinson

Vanessa Williams singles chronology
"(He's Got) The Look" (1988)	"Dreamin'" (1988)	"Darlin' I" (1989)

Music video
- "Dreamin'" on YouTube

"Dreamin'" is a song written by Lisa Montgomery and Geneva Paschal and originally performed by the family group Guinn for their self-titled album in 1986.

== Vanessa Williams recording ==
In 1988, American singer and actress Vanessa Williams recorded the song and released it as the third single from her debut studio album, The Right Stuff (1988). In the United States, the single was Williams' first top 40 hit and first number-one hit on the Billboard R&B chart, where it stayed at the top of the chart for two weeks. On the Billboard Hot 100 pop chart, "Dreamin'" peaked at number eight. Elsewhere, "Dreamin'" reached number 74 on the UK Singles Chart, number 40 in the Netherlands and number 19 in New Zealand.

At the 32nd Annual Grammy Awards in 1990, the song received a nomination for Grammy Award for Best Female R&B Vocal Performance.

== Track listings ==
- European CD single
1. "Dreamin'" (Album Version) – 5:25
2. "Dreamin'" (Instrumental) – 5:25
3. "The Right Stuff" (Album Version) – 4:18

== Personnel ==
- Vanessa Williams – lead and background vocals
- Rachelle Ferrell, Carol Coleman, Lori Fulton – background vocals
- Donald Robinson – producer, keyboards, mixing, arrangements
- Randy Bowland – guitar
- Jim Salamone – drum programming
- Daryl Burgee – percussion
- Ron Kerber – saxophone
- Mike Tarsia – engineering, mixing
- Adam Silverman – assistant engineer
- Ronald Distasio – assistant engineer

== Charts ==
=== Weekly charts ===
Weekly chart performance for "Dreamin'"
Chart (1989)	Peak position
Australia (ARIA)	108
Canada Top Singles (RPM)	16
Netherlands (Dutch Top 40 Tipparade)	5
Netherlands (Single Top 100)	40
New Zealand (Recorded Music NZ)	19
UK Singles (Official Charts)	74
US Billboard Hot 100	8
US Adult Contemporary (Billboard)	2
US Hot R&B/Hip-Hop Songs (Billboard)	1
US Cash Box Top 100 Singles	10
US Top R&B Singles (Cash Box)	1

=== Year-end charts ===
Year-end chart performance for "Dreamin'"
Chart (1989)	Position
US Billboard Hot 100	89
US Adult Contemporary (Billboard)	16
US Hot R&B/Hip-Hop Songs (Billboard)	13
US Top R&B Singles (Cash Box)	18
