= We Love Disney (disambiguation) =

We Love Disney is a compilation series of albums released throughout the 2010s consisting of cover versions of Disney songs.

We Love Disney may also refer to:

- We Love Disney (2013 album), France
- We Love Disney (2014 album), Australia
- We Love Disney (2015 album), United States
- We Love Disney (2016 album), Latin America
