= Wish Upon a Star: A Tribute to the Music of Walt Disney =

Studio album by Jenny Oaks Baker
- Released: August 2, 2011
- Genre: Classical, instrumental
- Label: Shadow Mountain
- Producer: Kurt Bestor

Jenny Oaks Baker chronology
Silver Screen Serenade (2008)	Wish Upon a Star: A Tribute to the Music of Walt Disney (2011)	Noel: Carols of Christmas Past (2012)

Wish Upon a Star: A Tribute to the Music of Walt Disney is the tenth studio album by American classical violinist Jenny Oaks Baker, released in 2011 through Shadow Mountain Records. Produced and arranged by Kurt Bestor, the Disney music tribute album features eleven tracks, including one medley of songs from Mary Poppins.

Wish Upon a Star reached peak positions of number six on Billboard's Classical Albums chart, thirty-five on the Top Heatseekers chart and number eighteen on the Top Kid Audio chart. Wish Upon a Star also earned her a Grammy Award nomination for Best Pop Instrumental Album.

== Development and composition ==
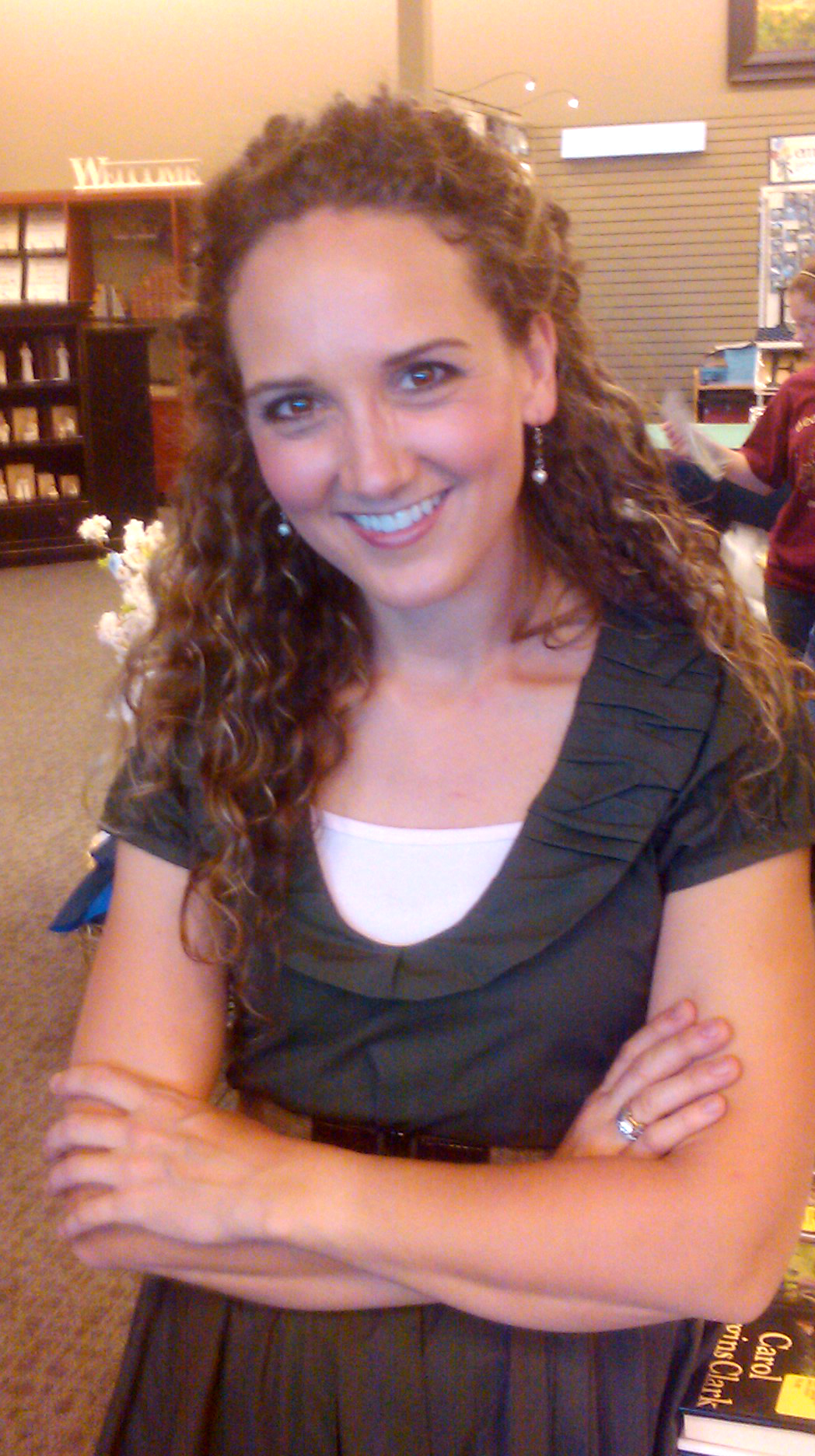
Jenny Oaks Baker in 2010

Wish Upon a Star marks Baker's tenth studio album, having previously recorded albums consisting of movie tunes, hymns and classical music.

The album contains eleven tracks, including one medley of songs from the 1964 film Mary Poppins. The opening track, "Colors of the Wind", was written by composer Alan Menken and lyricist Stephen Schwartz for the 1995 film Pocahontas. The song earned the duo an Academy Award for Best Original Song, a Golden Globe Award for Best Original Song and a Grammy Award for Best Song Written Specifically for a Motion Picture or Television. "A Spoonful of Sugar", "Chim Chim Cher-ee", "Step in Time, Feed the Birds", "Supercalifragilisticexpialidocious" and "Let's Go Fly a Kite" were each written by Robert B. Sherman and Richard M. Sherman, often credited as the Sherman Brothers.

Track three, "Beauty and the Beast" features cellist Nicole Pinnell.

== Track listing ==
1. "Colors of the Wind" (Alan Menken, Stephen Schwartz)
2. "When You Wish Upon a Star" (Leigh Harline, Ned Washington)
3. "Beauty and the Beast" (Menken, Howard Ashman)
4. "A Whole New World" (Menken, Tim Rice)
5. "God Help the Outcasts" (Menkin, Schwartz)
6. "A Dream Is a Wish Your Heart Makes" (Mack David, Al Hoffman, Jerry Livingston)
7. "Mary Poppins Fantasia: A Spoonful of Sugar / Chim Chim Cher-ee / Step in Time, Feed the Birds / Supercalifragilisticexpialidocious / Let's Go Fly a Kite" (Robert B. Sherman, Richard M. Sherman)
8. "Part of Your World" (Menken, Ashman)
9. "Once Upon a Dream" (Jack Lawrence, Sammy Fain)
10. "Can You Feel the Love Tonight?" (Elton John, Rice)
11. "Baby Mine" (Frank Churchill, Washington)

== See also ==
- List of Disney film soundtracks
