= The Best Disney Album in the World ...Ever! =

The Best Disney Album in the World...Ever!

Box set
- Released: November 27, 2006
- Recorded: 1937–2006
- Label: Walt Disney

The Best Disney Album in the World...Ever! is a three disc audio CD box set compiling popular Disney songs from films, theme park attractions, and television series, ranging from 1933 to 2006. It was released in the United Kingdom on November 27, 2006 by Walt Disney Records and EMI International.

== Track listing ==
=== Disc 1 ===
1. "Breaking Free" (High School Musical)
2. "You'll Be in My Heart" (Tarzan)
3. "Circle of Life" (The Lion King)
4. "Be Our Guest" (Beauty and the Beast)
5. "A Whole New World" (Aladdin)
6. "Part of Your World" (The Little Mermaid)
7. "The Bare Necessities" (The Jungle Book)
8. "He's a Tramp" (Lady and the Tramp)
9. "Chim Chim Cher-ee" (Mary Poppins)
10. "Cruella De Vil" (One Hundred and One Dalmatians)
11. "When I See an Elephant Fly" (Dumbo)
12. "Hakuna Matata" (The Lion King)
13. "Heigh-Ho" (Snow White and the Seven Dwarfs)
14. "Bibbidi-Bobbidi-Boo" (Cinderella)
15. "It's a Small World" (It's a Small World)
16. "The Second Star to the Right" (Peter Pan)
17. "Once Upon a Dream" (Sleeping Beauty)
18. "Little April Shower" (Bambi)
19. "Colours of the Wind" (Pocahontas)
20. "Look Through My Eyes" (Brother Bear)
21. "They Live in You" (The Lion King: Original Broadway Cast Recording)
22. "Best of Friends" (The Fox and the Hound)
23. "If I Didn't Have You" (Monsters, Inc.)
24. "When You Wish Upon a Star" (Pinocchio)

=== Disc 2 ===
1. "Mickey Mouse March" (The Mickey Mouse Club)
2. "Zip-a-Dee-Doo-Dah" (Song of the South)
3. "The Aristocats" (The Aristocats)
4. "With a Few Good Friends" (Piglet's Big Movie)
5. "Can You Feel the Love Tonight" (The Lion King)
6. "Beauty and the Beast" (Beauty and the Beast)
7. "A Dream Is a Wish Your Heart Makes" (Cinderella)
8. "Someday My Prince Will Come" (Snow White and the Seven Dwarfs)
9. "Baby Mine" (Dumbo)
10. "Reflection" (Mulan)
11. "Kiss the Girl" (The Little Mermaid)
12. "When She Loved Me" (Toy Story 2)
13. "Give a Little Whistle" (Pinocchio)
14. "Supercalifragilisticexpialidocious" (Mary Poppins)
15. "Let's Get Together" (The Parent Trap)
16. "The Monkey's Uncle" (The Monkey's Uncle)
17. "Colonel Hathi's March" (The Jungle Book)
18. "The Ballad of Davy Crockett" (Davy Crockett)
19. "Following the Leader" (Peter Pan)
20. "Yo Ho (A Pirate's Life for Me)" (Pirates of the Caribbean)
21. "The Unbirthday Song" (Alice in Wonderland)
22. "The Bells of Notre Dame" (The Hunchback of Notre Dame)
23. "What's This?" (The Nightmare Before Christmas)
24. "The Wonderful Thing About Tiggers" (Winnie the Pooh and the Blustery Day)
25. "Who's Afraid of the Big Bad Wolf?" (Three Little Pigs)
26. "Mickey Mouse Club, Alma Mater" (The Mickey Mouse Club)

=== Disc 3 ===
1. "He's a Pirate" (Pirates of the Caribbean: The Curse of the Black Pearl)
2. "On My Way" (Brother Bear)
3. "Everybody Wants to Be a Cat" (The Aristocats)
4. "I Wan'na Be Like You" (The Jungle Book)
5. "The Tiki, Tiki, Tiki Room" (Walt Disney's Enchanted Tiki Room)
6. "You've Got a Friend in Me" (Toy Story)
7. "The Ugly Bug Ball" (Summer Magic)
8. "Winnie the Pooh" (Winnie the Pooh and the Honey Tree)
9. "So This Is Love" (Cinderella)
10. "Candle on the Water" (Pete's Dragon)
11. "Just Around the Riverbend" (Pocahontas)
12. "Go the Distance" (Hercules)
13. "A Spoonful of Sugar" (Mary Poppins)
14. "The Beautiful Briny" (Bedknobs and Broomsticks)
15. "The Siamese Cat Song" (Lady and the Tramp)
16. "Under the Sea" (The Little Mermaid)
17. "Hawaiian Roller Coaster Ride" (Lilo & Stitch)
18. "I Won't Say (I'm in Love)" (Hercules)
19. "Strangers Like Me" (Tarzan)
20. "The Jungle Rhythm" (The Jungle Book 2)
21. "One Little Slip" (Chicken Little)
22. "Why Not" (The Lizzie McGuire Movie)
23. "Supernatural" (That's So Raven)
24. "Cheetah Sisters" (The Cheetah Girls)
25. "The Best of Both Worlds" (Hannah Montana)
