= We Love Disney (2016 album) =

Compilation album by Various artists
- Released: March 11, 2016
- Genre: Latin pop
- Length: 60:15
- Language: Spanish
- Label: Universal Music Mexico
- Producer: Áureo Baqueiro

We Love Disney series chronology
We Love Disney (2015)	We Love Disney (2016)	Everybody Loves Disney (2016)

We Love Disney, also titled We Love Disney (Latino) is a 2016 compilation album and seventh entry in the We Love Disney series, featuring cover versions of Disney songs by Spanish-speaking musicians from various genres. The album was released on March 11, 2016, through Universal Music Mexico, and was produced by Mexican producer Áureo Baqueiro. The cover features Mickey Mouse as characterized in the 1940 film Fantasia.

In the United States, the album peaked at number four at the Top Latin Albums chart and topped the Latin Pop Albums chart. In Chile, the album topped the chart on iTunes.

== Background ==
A 16-song album, We Love Disney (Latino) features cover versions of songs performed by various Ibero-American artists, both from Spain (Ana Torroja, David Bisbal, Alejandro Sanz and Paula Rojo), and from Latin America (Belanova, La Santa Cecilia, Luciano Pereyra and Paty Cantú, among others). All songs featured are from Disney animated films, with the exception of "Supercalifragilisticoespialidoso" from the live-action musical film Mary Poppins.

The album was supported by the single "El Ciclo Sin Fin", which is also the opening track of the album, performed by Mexican singer Alejandro Fernandez and his daughter Camila Fernandez, the latter in her recording debut. The single was released on February 19, 2016. The physical version of the album includes a DVD consisting of official music videos for seven of the songs of the album.

== Track listing ==
We Love Disney track listing
No.	Title	Writer(s)	Producer(s)	Length
1.	"El Ciclo Sin Fin" (from The Lion King)	Elton John; Tim Rice	Alejandro Fernandez featuring Camila Fernandez	4:03
2.	"Bajo el Mar" (from The Little Mermaid)	Alan Menken; Howard Ashman	Alejandro Sanz	4:10
3.	"Colores en el Viento" (from Pocahontas)	Menken; Stephen Schwartz	Ana Torroja	4:45
4.	"Cuando Ella Me Amaba" (from Toy Story 2)	Randy Newman	Belanova	3:16
5.	"Quiero Ser Como Tú" (from The Jungle Book)	Richard M. Sherman; Robert B. Sherman	Grupo Cañaveral de Humberto Pabón	3:19
6.	"No Importa la Distancia" (from Hercules)	Menken; David Zippel	David Bisbal	3:55
7.	"Busca Lo Más Vital" (from The Jungle Book)	Terry Gilkyson	Emmanuel	4:33
8.	"En Mi Corazón Vivirás" (from Tarzan)	Phil Collins	Eros Ramazzotti	3:54
9.	"Todos Quieren Ser un Gato Jazz" (from The Aristocats)	Floyd Huddleston; Al Rinker	Esteman; Caloncho; Mon Laferte	4:36
10.	"La Bella y la Bestia" (from Beauty and the Beast)	Menken; Ashman	Jencarlos Canela; Paula Rojo	3:47
11.	"Yo Soy Tu Amigo Fiel" (from Toy Story)	Newman	Julión Álvarez	2:18
12.	"Supercalifragilisticoespialidoso" (from Mary Poppins)	B. Sherman; M. Sherman	La Santa Cecilia	2:55
13.	"Un Mundo Ideal" (from Aladdin)	Menken; Rice	Luciano Pereyra	3:20
14.	"Esta Noche es Para Amar" (from The Lion King)	John; Rice	Luis Fonsi	4:00
15.	"La Estrella Azul" (from Pinocchio)	Leigh Harline; Ned Washington	Paty Cantú	3:32
16.	"Sueña" (from The Hunchback of Notre Dame)	Menken; Schwartz	Sofia Carson	3:52
Total length:				60:15

== Charts ==
Chart (2016)	Peak position
US Latin Pop Albums	1
US Top Latin Albums	4
