= The Sweetest Days =

1994 studio album by Vanessa Williams

Studio album by Vanessa Williams
- Released: December 6, 1994
- Recorded: January 1993–October 1994
- Studio: Axis Studios (New York City); Battery Studios (New York City); Electric Lady Studios (New York City); Power Station (New York City); The Hit Factory (New York City); Bass Hit (New York City); Sorcerer Studios (New York City); Right Track Recording (New York City); RPM Sound (New York City); East Wing (New York City); Sony Music Studios (New York City); Capitol Studios (Hollywood, California); Westlake Recording Studios (West Hollywood, California); Mad Hatter Studios (Los Angeles); Music Grinder Studios (Hollywood, California); Larrabee Sound Studios (North Hollywood, California); The Bennett House (Franklin, Tennessee); Javelina Recording (Nashville, Tennessee); Goodnight Studios (Dallas, Texas)
- Genre: Pop; R&B
- Length: 52:08
- Label: Wing; Mercury
- Producer: Babyface; Gerry E. Brown; Keith Thomas; Vanessa Williams

Vanessa Williams chronology
The Comfort Zone (1991)	The Sweetest Days (1994)	Star Bright (1996)

Singles from The Sweetest Days
- 1. "The Sweetest Days" Released: October 18, 1994; 2. "The Way That You Love" Released: January 24, 1995; 3. "Colors of the Wind" Released: April 25, 1995; 4. "You Can't Run" Released: July 17, 1995; 5. "Higher Ground" Released: October 10, 1995; 6. "Betcha Never" Released: January 30, 1996

Professional ratings
Review scores
Source	Rating
AllMusic	3/5 stars
Entertainment Weekly	3.5/5 stars
Muzik	4.5/5 stars
Robert Christgau	(neither)

The Sweetest Days is the third studio album by American singer and actress Vanessa Williams. It was released on December 6, 1994, by Wing Records and Mercury Records. The album peaked at number 57 on the US Billboard 200 and at number 25 on the Top R&B/Hip-Hop Albums chart, and has been certified platinum by the Recording Industry Association of America (RIAA).

The album includes the singles "You Can't Run", "Betcha Never", "The Way That You Love", and the title track. It also includes the first recording of the song "Higher Ground" later covered by Barbra Streisand as the title track from her 1997 album, as well as cover versions of songs previously recorded by Patti Austin and Sting. The album was re-released in 1995 with the additional track "Colors of the Wind", the theme from the Disney animated film Pocahontas.

"The Way That You Love" and "You Can't Run" were nominated at the 1996 Grammy Awards for Best R&B Vocal Performance, Female and Best R&B Song, respectively.

== Track listing ==
No.	Title	Writer(s)	Producer(s)	Length
1.	"Intro-Lude"	Nick Moroch; Gerry E. Brown	Brown; Vanessa Williams	0:55
2.	"The Way That You Love"	J. Dibbs; Abenaa	Brown; Williams; J. Dibbs^{[a]}	4:48
3.	"Betcha Never"	Babyface	Babyface	3:55
4.	"The Sweetest Days"	Jon Lind; Wendy Waldman; Phil Galdston	Keith Thomas	3:31
5.	"Higher Ground"	Steve Dorff; George Gree	Brown; Williams	4:19
6.	"You Don't Have to Say You're Sorry"	Patti Austin	Brown; Williams	4:10
7.	"Ellamental"	Laythan Armor; Bunny Hull	Brown; Williams	6:06
8.	"Sister Moon"	Sting	Brown; Williams	5:28
9.	"You Can't Run"	Babyface	Babyface	4:27
10.	"Moonlight Over Paris"	Peter Mayer; James Mayer; Roger Guth	Brown; Williams	5:07
11.	"Constantly"	Donald Robinson	Brown; Williams; Galdston^{[a]}	5:04
12.	"Long Way Home"	Brock Walsh; Eric Carmen; Galdston	Brown; Williams	4:18

1996 Japanese reissue bonus tracks
No.	Title	Writer(s)	Producer(s)	Length
13.	"Love Is" (duet with Brian McKnight)	Tonio K; John Keller	Brown; Williams; McKnight	4:46
14.	"Colors of the Wind" (radio mix)	Alan Menken; Stephen Schwartz	Thomas	4:20

1995 Target exclusive edition (bonus CD single)
No.	Title	Writer(s)	Producer(s)	Length
1.	"For All the Children"	Don Sebesky; Gloria Nissenson	Brown; Moroch	3:20
2.	"Colors of the Wind" (radio mix)	Menken; Schwartz	Thomas	4:18

=== Notes ===
- ^{^[a]} signifies a co-producer

== Personnel ==
Adapted from AllMusic.

=== Musicians ===
- Vanessa Williams – vocals, backing vocals (2, 7, 12), arrangements (5, 6, 10), vocal arrangements (8, 11), BGV arrangements (8, 12)
- Gerry Brown – keyboards (1), special effects (1), arrangements (5, 6, 8, 10, 11), electric piano (7)
- Leon Pendarvis – acoustic piano (2)
- J. Dibbs – programming (2), rhythm arrangements (2)
- Babyface – keyboards (3, 9), drum programming (3, 9)
- Randy Walker – MIDI programming (3, 9)
- Keith Thomas – acoustic piano (4), synthesizer programming (4), bass (4), arrangements (4)
- Joel Diamond – organ (5, 11)
- Jeff Bova – strings (5), keyboards (8, 10), programming (10), additional synthesizer programming (12), Mellotron (12)
- Greg Phillinganes – Rhodes electric piano (6)
- Laythan Armor – Rhodes electric piano (7), programming (7), rhythm arrangements (7)
- Philippe Saisse – keyboards (8), acoustic piano (8)
- Joe Mennonna – accordion (10)
- Phil Galdston – keyboards (12), synthesizer programming (12), arrangements (12), BGV arrangements (12)
- Dominic Cortese – accordion (12)
- Nick Moroch – guitars (1, 2, 5, 7, 8, 10, 11), Mellotron (5), synth bass (5), arrangements (5, 8, 10, 11), mandolin (10)
- Ricardo Silveira – guitars (3)
- Dann Huff – acoustic guitar (4), electric guitar (4)
- Larry Carlton – guitar solo (6)
- Bill Malina – guitars (6), arrangements (6)
- Ira Siegel – guitars (12)
- Ron Carter – acoustic bass (7, 8)
- Armand Sabal-Lecco – bass (8)
- Anthony Jackson – bass (10)
- Pino Palladino – bass slides (10), bass (12)
- Mark Hammond – drum programming (4)
- Kenwood Dennard – drums (8)
- Peter Erskine – drums (8)
- James Murphy – drums (12)
- Roy Ayers – vibraphone (2)
- Paulinho da Costa – percussion (3, 5, 9)
- Carol Steele – percussion (12)
- Ron Blake – saxophone (7)
- Roy Hargrove – trumpet (7)
- Toots Thielemans – harmonica (8)
- The Nashville String Machine – strings (4)
- Ronn Huff – string arrangements and conductor (4)
- Clare Fischer – string arrangements (6), string conductor (6, 12)
- Brent Fischer – string orchestration (12)
- Carl Gorodetzky – string contractor (4)
- Morris Repass – string contractor (6)
- Abenaa – backing vocals (2)
- Tabitha Fair – backing vocals (4)
- Kenny Hicks – backing vocals (7), BGV arrangements (8)
- Bunny Hull – backing vocals (7)
- Fonzi Thornton – backing vocals (7)
- Soul Man – rap (7)
- Sting – backing vocals (8)
- Brock Walsh – backing vocals (12), arrangements (12), BGV arrangements (12)

=== Production ===
- Ed Eckstine – executive producer
- Gerry Brown – producer (1, 2, 5–8, 10, 11), mixing (2, 5–7, 10)
- Vanessa Williams – producer (1, 2, 5–8, 10, 11)
- J. Dibbs – co-producer (2)
- Babyface – producer (3, 9)
- Keith Thomas – producer (4)
- Phil Galdston – producer (12)
- Bill Malina – engineer (2, 7), mixing (2, 5–7, 10, 11), recording (5, 6, 10, 11), digital editing
- Brad Gilderman – engineer (3, 9)
- Mick Guzauski – mixing (3, 9, 12)
- Bill Whittington – recording (4), mixing (4)
- Al Schmitt – engineer (6)
- Nick Moroch – mixing (11)
- Mike Scott – engineer (12)
- Tim Leitner – additional engineer (4)
- Mike Scott – assistant mix engineer (12)
- Ryan Arnold – assistant engineer
- Bryan Carrigan – assistant engineer
- Tim Conklin – assistant engineer
- Martin Czembor – assistant engineer
- Tim Donovan – assistant engineer
- Suzanne Dyer – assistant engineer
- Eric Fischer – assistant engineer
- Carl Glanville – assistant engineer
- Vaughn Merrick – assistant engineer
- Jay Militscher – assistant engineer
- Jen Monnar – assistant engineer
- Marty Ogden – assistant engineer
- Greg Parker – assistant engineer
- Jamey Perenot – assistant engineer
- Joe Pirrera – assistant engineer
- Marnie Riley – assistant engineer
- Rory Romano – assistant engineer
- Dexter Simmons – assistant engineer
- Bill Smith – assistant engineer
- Robert Smith – assistant engineer
- Brian Sperber – assistant engineer
- Casey Stone – assistant engineer
- King Williams – assistant engineer
- Dann Wojnar – assistant engineer
- Mick Corey – technical support
- Barry Duryea – technical support
- Artie Smith – technical support
- Christian "Wicked" Wicht – technical support
- Max Risenhoover – digital editing
- Herb Powers – mastering at The Hit Factory Mastering (New York City, New York)
- Victor Winograd – cartage services
- Jackie Brown – production assistant
- Derek Duffey – production assistant
- Ivy Skoff – production coordinator (3, 9)
- Todd Moore – production coordinator (4)
- Anthony Block – cover typeset
- Chris Thompson – art direction
- Marty Maidenberg – package layout design
- Peter Lindbergh – photography
- Marietta Ciriello – stylist
- Odile Gilbert – hair stylist
- Stephanie Marais – make-up
- Hervey & Company – management

== Charts ==
=== Weekly charts ===
Weekly chart performance for The Sweetest Days
Chart (1994–1995)	Peak position
Australian Albums (ARIA)	72
German Albums (Offizielle Top 100)	74
Japanese Albums (Oricon)	36
US Billboard 200	57
US Top R&B/Hip-Hop Albums (Billboard)	25

=== Year-end charts ===
Year-end chart performance for The Sweetest Days
Chart (1995)	Position
US Billboard 200	142
US Top R&B/Hip-Hop Albums (Billboard)	68

== Certifications ==
Certifications for The Sweetest Days
Region	Certification	Certified units/sales
Japan (RIAJ)	Gold	100,000^{^}
United States (RIAA)	Platinum	1,000,000^{^}
^{^} Shipments figures based on certification alone.
