= We Love Disney (2014 album) =

Compilation album by Various artists
- Released: November 14, 2014
- Recorded: 2014
- Genre: Pop
- Label: Universal Music Australia

We Love Disney series chronology
We Love Disney (2013)	We Love Disney (2014)	We Love Disney (2015)

We Love Disney is a compilation album and second entry in the We Love Disney series. It was released in Australia on November 14, 2014.

== History ==
We Love Disney is the second album in the compilation series of the same name. It was released in Australia in November 2014, debuting at 69 on the Australia Album Chart. The album includes such Disney songs as "Let It Go" (from Frozen) and "Baby Mine" (from Dumbo) and such artists as Dannii Minogue and the McClymonts.

== Track listing ==
No.	Title	Artist	Length
1.	"Do You Want to Build a Snowman?" (from Frozen)	Fatai	3:06
2.	"That's How You Know" (from Enchanted)	Dannii Minogue	3:56
3.	"I'm Wishing" (from Snow White and the Seven Dwarfs)	Kimbra	4:13
4.	"Go the Distance" (from Hercules)	Harrison Craig	4:05
5.	"Breaking Free" (from High School Musical)	Little Sea	3:15
6.	"I Wan'na Be Like You" (from The Jungle Book)	David Campbell	3:18
7.	"Circle of Life" (from The Lion King)	Mustered Courage	4:56
8.	"A Dream Is a Wish Your Heart Makes" (from Cinderella)	Anja Nissen	4:31
9.	"Let it Go" (from Frozen)	The McClymonts	4:05
10.	"You'll Be in My Heart" (from Tarzan)	Titanium	4:10
11.	"Beauty and the Beast" (from Beauty and the Beast)	Sol3 Mio	4:05
12.	"Baby Mine" (from Dumbo)	Kate Miller-Heidke	4:20

== Charts ==
Chart (2014)	Peak position
Australian Albums Chart	66
