= Main Street Country =

Compilation album by Various artists
- Released: April 3, 2026
- Studio: Various
- Genre: Country
- Length: 18:59
- Label: Walt Disney

Various artists chronology
| A Whole New Sound (2024) | Main Street Country (2026) |

Main Street Country is a compilation EP produced and released by Walt Disney Records as part of the Mickey & Friends music series, consisting of reimagined country versions of songs from Disney films. It was released on April 3, 2026.

It includes a cover of the duet "Beauty and the Beast", originally recorded by Céline Dion and Peabo Bryson and later by Ariana Grande and John Legend, by husband-and-wife duo Kane Brown and Katelyn Brown. It also features a cover of "You'll Be in My Heart", originally recorded by Phil Collins, by Maddie & Tae, which will be their final recording as a duo, and additional covers by Restless Road, Dasha, and Breland.

== Track listing ==
| No. | Title | Writer(s) | Artist | Length |
|---|---|---|---|---|
| 1. | "Beauty and the Beast" (from Beauty and the Beast) | Alan Menken, Howard Ashman | Kane Brown & Katelyn Brown | 3:48 |
| 2. | "The Climb" (from Hannah Montana: The Movie) | Jessi Alexander, Jon Mabe | Restless Road | 3:50 |
| 3. | "She's So Gone" (from Lemonade Mouth) | Matthew Tishler, Shane Stevens, Maria Christensen | Dasha | 2:45 |
| 4. | "You'll Be in My Heart" (from Tarzan) | Phil Collins | Maddie & Tae | 4:19 |
| 5. | "Go the Distance" (from Hercules) | Menken, David Zippel | Breland | 4:15 |
| Total length: | | | | 18:59 |

== Charts ==
Chart performance for Main Street Country
| Chart (2026) | Peak position |
|---|---|
| UK Album Downloads (OCC) | 85 |

== See also ==
- A Whole New Sound
- Muppets: The Green Album
- Nightmare Revisited
