= Betty Noyes =

American actress

- Betty Noyes in Cinderella (1965)
- Born: Elizabeth Noyes; October 11, 1912; Oklahoma, U.S.
- Died: December 24, 1987 (aged 75); Los Angeles, California, U.S.
- Years active: 1938–1968
- Spouse: Milton Hand
- Children: 2

Elizabeth Noyes Hand (October 11, 1912 – December 24, 1987) was an American singer and actress best known for dubbing two of Debbie Reynolds' numbers in the 1952 film Singin' in the Rain. Today, this is a well-known example of dubbing in a film musical: While Reynolds's character was the "ghost singer" dubbing for another character in the film, Reynolds's singing voice was actually dubbed by Noyes.

She is also known for singing the song "Baby Mine" in the Disney film Dumbo (1941), which was nominated for the Academy Award for Best Original Song. However, she was not given screen credit for this performance. (None of the voice actors for Dumbo were credited on screen.)

== Known career ==
Noyes began her career in 1938 in The Debutantes, a trio of young women in the Ted Fio Rito big band. They made the original recording of "My Little Grass Shack in Kealakekua, Hawaii." As a member of The Debutantes (with Marjorie Briggs, Dottie Hill and Dorothy Compton), she contributed vocals for Candy Candido and the Debutantes.

In 1947, she was in a quartet called "The Girlfriends," a regular feature on several NBC Radio programs, including The Bill Goodwin Show, The Carnation Contented Hour, and with Bing Crosby. Norma Zimmer, Lawrence Welk's "Champagne Lady," was also in the group. Noyes and other members of the quartet became "First Call" studio singers and can be heard on many movie musicals during this period, including The Wizard of Oz (1939) with Judy Garland, White Christmas (1954) with Bing Crosby, and The Sound of Music (1965) with Bill Lee.

She also appeared on camera in several movies and television series, including regular appearances on The Dinah Shore Show and an episode of I Love Lucy, titled "Lucy Goes to Scotland." She appeared as a mother who sings a brief solo in the 1965 television movie Rodgers and Hammerstein's Cinderella, along with fellow dubber Bill Lee. On-screen movie credits include I Married an Angel (1942), the Don Knotts comedy The Love God? (1969), and Abbott and Costello's Jack and the Beanstalk (1952). Other credits include recordings with Ken Darby and Jack Halloren and singing and voice work for the "Ice Follies."

== Personal life ==
Betty Noyes was married to Milton Hand, a football and PE coach at Los Angeles City College. They had two daughters, Susan and Deborah. The family lived in Studio City, California. Betty and her husband eventually retired to Balboa Island, Calif. Betty's name has sometimes been incorrectly noted as 'Betty Royce', including in Debbie Reynolds's autobiography.

Noyes died on December 24, 1987, at the age of 75, in Los Angeles, California.

== Confirmed work ==
- Dumbo (1941) uncredited as singer of "Baby Mine"
- I Married an Angel (1942) uncredited specialty bit in Paris Honeymoon sequence
- Singin' in the Rain (1952) uncredited as the singing voice of Debbie Reynolds on "Would You" and "You Are My Lucky Star."
- Seven Brides for Seven Brothers (1954) singing voice of Ruta Kilmonis (later known as Ruta Lee)
- I Love Lucy (1 episode, 1956) as Townsperson in "Lucy Goes to Scotland"
- Cinderella (1965) as Mother

== Selected list of known vocal performances ==
In film

- The Alamo
- Blue Hawaii
- Camelot
- Doctor Dolittle
- The Greatest Story Ever Told
- The Hallelujah Trail
- How the West Was Won
- The Incredible Mr. Limpet providing character voice of "Lady Fish" in animated-cartoon sequences
- King of Kings
- The Music Man
- Mutiny on the Bounty
- My Fair Lady
- The Sound of Music
- State Fair
- White Christmas
- The Wizard of Oz

In music

- That Bad Eartha (background vocalist)
