= We Love Disney (2013 album) =

Compilation album by Various artists
- Released: December 2, 2013
- Recorded: 2013
- Genre: Pop
- Label: Mercury

We Love Disney series chronology
We Love Disney (2013)	We Love Disney (2014)

We Love Disney is a French compilation album and first entry in the We Love Disney series. Containing 17 songs from Disney soundtracks, performed by French singers and artists, the album was released on December 2, 2013.

Following the commercial success of this first album, Universal released a second album on November 3, 2014, with the first single Tendre rêve, performed by Alizée.

== History ==
We Love Disney is the first album in the compilation series of the same name. It was released in France in December 2013, The project was led by Universal Music Group's Mercury Records and included collaborations from artists that included Élodie Frégé and Ben l'Oncle Soul. It became the fourteenth best selling album in France in 2013. It charted in numerous countries, including #2 in Belgium, #2 in France, and #8 in Switzerland.

This album aims to pay tribute to the musical world of Walt Disney Pictures thanks to the cover of several songs from his films by French artists. The project was initiated by Disney Music Group (under the creative impulse of Boualem Lamhene) and led by the Mercury / Universal label, which has developed its partnership with the Disney Music Group since March 20, 2013 by sharing producers and composers for contract artists and future Disney productions.

The first single from the album is Un jour mon prince viendra, performed by Élodie Frégé.

A second single Être un homme comme vous, performed by Ben l'Oncle Soul, is also published.

A last single was sent to radio stations, L'air du vent performed by Jenifer.

Following the commercial success of this first album, Universal released a second album on November 3, 2014, with the first single Tendre rêve, performed by Alizée.

In 2015, the Franchise was rolled out internationally. An American version has appeared and includes titles performed by Ne-Yo, Gwen Stefani, Ariana Grande, Jason Derulo, Fall Out Boy or Jessie J.

In 2016, a Latin version of this project was born and includes titles performed by Eros Ramazzotti, Ana Torroja, Alejandro Fernández, Alejandro Sanz or Belanova.

== Track listing ==
Digipak - CD Mercury 376 281 2 (UMG) / EAN 0602537628124

1. Élodie Frégé - "Un jour mon prince viendra"
  (from Blanche Neige)
2. Nolwenn Leroy - "Quand on prie la bonne étoile"
  (from Pinocchio)
3. Al.Hy + Arié Elmaleh - "Supercalifragilistic"
  (from Mary Poppins)
4. Ben l'Oncle Soul - "Être un homme comme vous"
  (from Le livre de la jungle)
5. Michaël Youn - "Il en faut peu pour être heureux"
  (from Le livre de la jungle)
6. Thomas Dutronc + Laura Smet - "Tout le monde veut devenir un cat"
  (from Les Aristochats)
7. Garou + Camille Lou - "La belle et la bête"
  (from La belle et la bête)
8. Alex Beaupain - "Prince Ali"
  (from Aladdin)
9. Joyce Jonathan + Olympe - "Ce rêve bleu"
  (from Aladdin)
10. Arié Elmaleh - "Je suis ton meilleur ami"
  (from Aladdin)
11. Zaho - "L'histoire de la vie"
  (from Le Roi Lion)
12. Christophe Willem - "L'amour brille sous les étoiles"
  (from Le Roi Lion)
13. Collégiale - "Hakuna Matata"
  (from Le Roi Lion)
14. Jenifer - "L'air du vent"
  (from Pocahontas)
15. Emmanuel Moire - "Rien qu'un jour"
  (from Le bossu de Notre-Dame)
16. Rose - "Au bout du rêve"
  (from La princesse et la grenouille)
17. Anaïs Delva - "Libérée, délivrée"
  (from La reine des neiges)

== Charts ==
Chart (2013 - 2014)	Peak position
Ultrapop 200 (Belgium)	2
French album	2
Swiss album	8
