= The Way That You Love =

1995 single by Vanessa Williams

Single by Vanessa Williams

from the album The Sweetest Days
- Released: January 24, 1995
- Length: 3:54
- Label: Wing; Mercury
- Songwriters: J. Dibbs; Abenaa
- Producers: Gerry E. Brown; Vanessa Williams

Vanessa Williams singles chronology
"The Sweetest Days" (1994)	"The Way That You Love" (1995)	"Colors of the Wind" (1995)

Music video
- "Vanessa Williams - The Way That You Love" on YouTube

"The Way That You Love" is a song by American singer and actress Vanessa Williams, released on January 24, 1995 by Mercury Records and Wing Records as the second single from her third album, The Sweetest Days (1994). The song was written by J. Dibbs and Abenaa and produced by Gerry E. Brown and Williams. Several remixes are available for the song, which became a top-10 hit on the US Billboard Dance/Club Play Songs chart. At the Grammy Awards in 1996, the song received a Grammy Award nomination for Best Female R&B Vocal Performance.

== Critical reception ==
Michael Eric Dyson from Rolling Stone wrote that on "The Way That You Love", "Williams pays tribute to a lover's charms with a mellow groove".

== Track listings and formats ==
European maxi CD

1. The Way That You Love (Mainstream Version) 3:54
2. The Way That You Love (Rhythm Mix) 3:47
3. The Way That You Love (20 Fingers Club Mix) 7:05
4. The Way That You Love (E. Plugg Jeep Mix) 4:39

US maxi CD

1. The Way That You Love (Rhythm Mix) 3:47
2. The Way That You Love (E. Plugg Jeep Mix) 4:39
3. The Way That You Love (Love Me Mix) 4:36
4. The Way That You Love (20 Fingers Club Mix) 7:05
5. The Way That You Love (Armand's Funky Foam Mix) 8:05
6. The Way That You Love (Late Night Mix) 5:45

UK maxi CD

1. The Way That You Love Me (Mainstream Version) 3:54
2. The Way That You Love Me (20 Fingers Club Mix) 7:05
3. The Way That You Love Me (Armand's Funky Foam Mix) 8:05
4. The Way That You Love Me (20 Fingers Dub) 5:28
5. The Way That You Love Me (Rhythm Mix) 3:47
6. The Way That You Love Me (Acappella) 3:21
7. The Way That You Love Me (Late Night Mix) 5:45

== Charts ==
=== Weekly charts ===
Chart (1995)	Peak position
Canada Top Singles (RPM)	39
Canada Adult Contemporary (RPM)	18
Scottish Singles Sales (Official Charts)	68
UK Singles (Official Charts)	52
UK Dance (Official Charts)	30
UK Hip Hop/R&B (Official Charts)	12
UK Pop Tip Club Chart (Music Week)	38
US Billboard Hot 100	67
US Dance Club Songs (Billboard)	6
US Dance Singles Sales (Billboard)	9
US Hot R&B/Hip-Hop Songs (Billboard)	23
US Cash Box Top 100	43

=== Year-end charts ===
Chart (1995)	Position
US Hot R&B/Hip-Hop Songs (Billboard)	95

== Release history ==
Region	Date	Format(s)	Label(s)	Ref.
United States	January 24, 1995	—N/a	Wing; Mercury	
United States	April 18, 1995	Contemporary hit radio; rhythmic contemporary radio	Wing; Mercury	
United Kingdom	June 26, 1995	12-inch vinyl; CD; cassette	Wing; Mercury	
