= Kurt Bestor =

American composer/performer (born 1958)

Kurt Bestor (born February 22, 1958) is an American keyboardist and composer specializing in new-age, orchestral arrangements, film scores, and jazz. He is known for his instrumental Christmas arrangements. His best-known song is "Prayer of the Children", a choral composition dedicated to child victims of war. He is also known for composing music for the 1993 movie Rigoletto, and for writing music for the 1988 Calgary Winter Olympics and 2002 Salt Lake City Olympic Games, where he composed and conducted music for the closing ceremonies.

With over 25 albums of his own, Bestor also arranges music for other notable artists, including violinists Caroline Campbell and Jenny Oaks Baker, award-winning vocalists Jennifer Warnes and Melissa Manchester, and popular classical-crossover cellist Stjepan Hauser. His arrangements have also been sung by the Mormon Tabernacle Choir, Harlem Boys Choir, and iconic rock group Three Dog Night.

A longtime Utah resident, Bestor plays concerts in Salt Lake City and throughout the Western states.

== Childhood years ==
Kurt Bestor was born in 1958 in Waukesha, Wisconsin. He took piano lessons from his mother as a child from the age of 7. His paternal grandfather played the trumpet in Western Big bands and his great uncle played the trombone in Jack Benny's band. Bestor and his family moved to Orem, Utah in 1966, where he attended Orem High School and learned to play the trumpet. When Bestor watched the 1975 film Jaws, he later recalled "I knew that’s what I wanted to do when I saw Jaws during high school. I made it a goal to score films from that moment." He was also greatly influenced by classical composers, most notably Aaron Copland, Edward Elgar, Claude Debussy, and Johann Sebastian Bach. Among living composers, Bestor cites John Williams and Dave Grusin as his biggest influences.

== College years ==
In 1976 Bestor and his family joined the Church of Jesus Christ of Latter-day Saints. He later went on a two-year religious mission in Yugoslavia, where he observed social problems such as homelessness, war, and poverty. The Yugoslav Civil War of the 1990s would later inspire his iconic song "Prayer of the Children." After his mission, Bestor married his first wife Melodie Bae.

Bestor attended Brigham Young University to write his songs for student projects, and also attended as a composing fellow, Sundance Institute's composer lab. He ultimately dropped out of Brigham Young University college to pursue a full-time musical career but was later awarded a degree in Music Composition with an emphasis is Studio Composition.

== Music career (1980-today) ==
In his early 20s, Kurt began working as a trumpet player and arranger at the Osmond TV Studios in Orem, Utah. He performed for a number of TV shows, TV specials, and early productions of the "Children's Miracle Network Telethon." He also provided arrangements for these productions. Also, during this time, Kurt and his colleague Sam Cardon were hired to compose and produce a large library of commercial jingles. This provided Kurt his first opportunity to create and arrange a large amount of music on a deadline, which would help him greatly as he later pursued his film scoring career.

Bestor was awarded an Emmy for his collaboration with Sam Cardon on the original music for ABC's coverage of the 1988 Winter Olympics. This provided his first record company "Airus Records" to encourage Kurt to produce his first Christmas album.

In the fall of 1988, Kurt Bestor released An Airus Christmas Volume 1 on cassette and CD. It was a career success for Bestor, and spawned his first live Christmas concert, held at Abravanel Hall in Salt Lake City. Kurt Bestor's Christmas music received national radio airplay in the late 1980s and early 1990s, and continues to be heard today during seasonal broadcast periods. He later went on to release Joyspring, Seasons, Evening Angels, An Airus Christmas Volume 2, and Innovators which featured Kurt's best-known composition "Prayer of the Children". He also released Noel Christmas Volume 3 and the album Sketches with the song Mama Don't You Weep. He also created film music for LDS Church videos, and composed the soundtrack for the 1993 movie Rigoletto and the 2000 cartoon movie "The Scarecrow". Kurt also composed for albums such as Innovators II and composed music for the Salt Lake City 2002 Winter Olympics.

Kurt Bestor still performs his "Kurt Bestor Christmas" Concerts, held now at the Eccles Theatre in Salt Lake City. In December 2018, Kurt completed his 31st consecutive year of these performances. He also performs a series of concerts each year over the Christmas holidays at the Egyptian Theater in Park City, Utah.

In 2014, Bestor released his first music video to accompany his song "Baroque Coco" from his album, Kurt Bestor and the Collective; Outside the Lines.

== Personal life ==
Bestor's 20-year marriage to first wife Melodie ended in 1999, and a second marriage ended in 2001 after just a few months. Balancing career obligations with family duties became difficult and created distance between Bestor and his children, Kristin and Erika, both of whom were born with spina bifida, a spinal defect that causes partial paralysis and other disabilities.

In January 2003, Bestor married Petrina, a Kenyan-born safari consultant who moved to Utah after serving as an assistant to Robert Redford on the set of Out of Africa.

== Discography ==
=== Albums ===
- 1988: Joyspring
- 1989: Seasons
- 1990: Joyspring II
- 1993: Innovators
- 1994: Evening Angels
- 1996: Timpanogos - A Prayer for Mountain Grace / Utah: 5 Sacred Lessons
- 1997: Sketches
- 1998: Fathers
- 1999: The Dance
- 2002: Innovators II
- 2005: A Life (ep)
- 2014: Outside the Lines

=== Christmas albums ===
- 1988: An Airus Christmas volume 1 (later known as Kurt Bestor Christmas volume 1 in 1996)
- 1991: An Airus Christmas volume 2 (later known as Kurt Bestor Christmas volume 2 in 1996)
- 1995: Christmas (later known as Noel in 1997)
- 1999: One Silent Night
- 2002: A Kurt Bestor Christmas - By Request
- 2016: Comes a Christmas Morning
- 2020: Christmas Time Is Here

=== Soundtracks and scores ===
- 1989: A More Perfect Union: America Becomes a Nation
- 1990: The Witching of Ben Wagner
- 1991: In Your Wildest Dreams
- 1992: Split Infinity
- 1992: The Buttercream Gang
- 1993: Rigoletto
- 1993: The Buttercream Gang in Secret of Treasure Mountain
- 1995: Behind the Waterfall
- 1995: The Seventh Brother
- 1995: Unspoken Song - A Celebration of 100 Years of Utah Spirit (with Sam Cardon)
- 1995: UTAH - Musical Spectacular (with Sam Cardon)
- 1998: Sedona - Spirit of Wonder
- 1998: No More Baths
- 1998: The Ghost of Dickens Past
- 1999: New Testament soundtrack
- 1999: Book of Mormon soundtrack
- 1999: Doctrine and Covenants soundtrack
- 2000: The Scarecrow
- 2000: The Lamb of God / Passion of the Lamb
- 2001: Saints of the Seas
- 2008: The Great American West
