= Jenny Oaks Baker =

American violinist

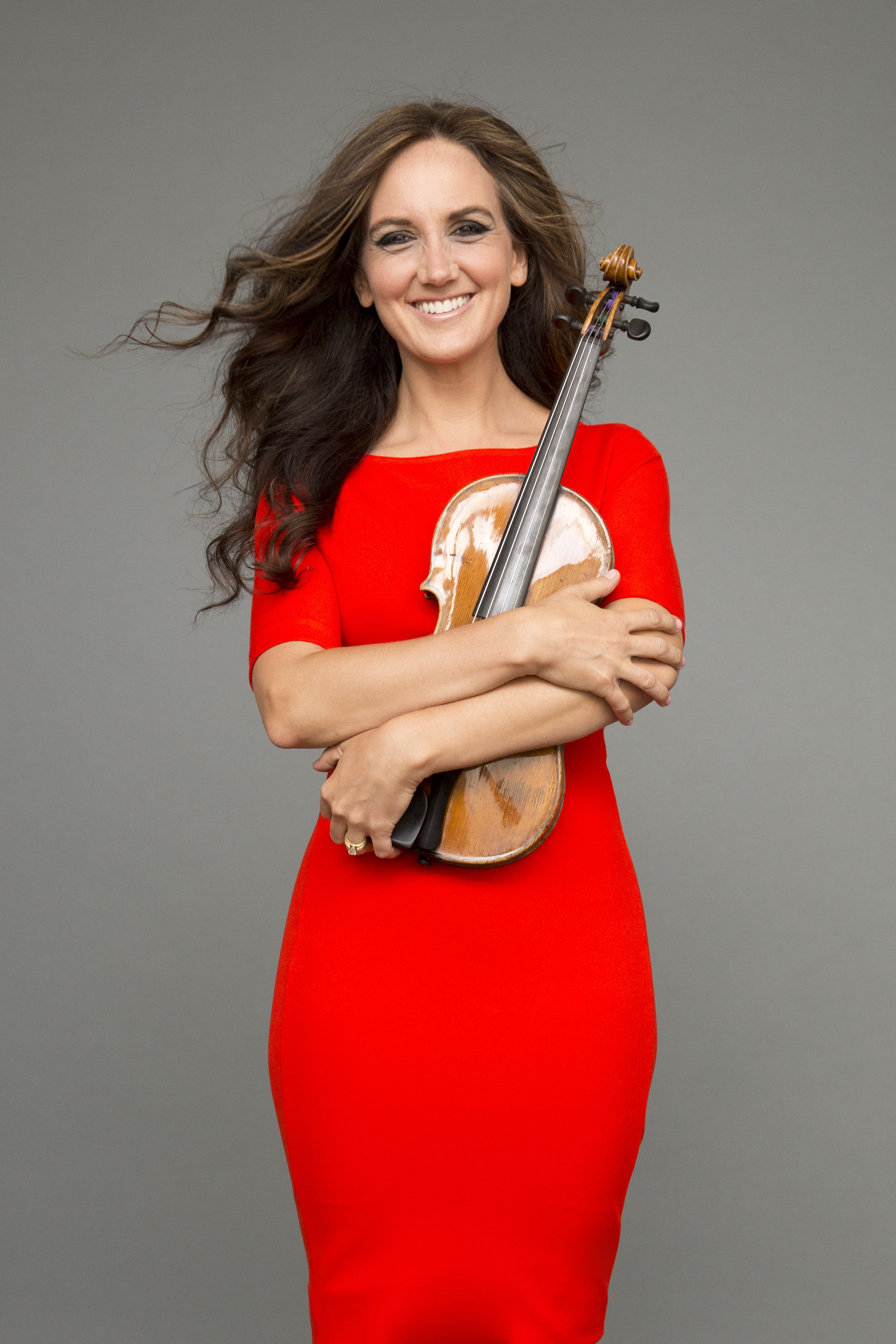
- Photo from Classic: The Rock Album in August 2013
- Born: Jenny June Oaks; May 27, 1975 (age 50); Provo, Utah, U.S.
- Education: Curtis Institute of Music (BM); Juilliard School (MM)
- Occupation: Violinist
- Years active: 1979–present
- Spouse: Matthew David Baker (m. 1998)
- Children: 4
- Parent(s): Father: Dallin H. Oaks (born 1932); Mother: June Dixon (1933–1998)
- Website: www.jennyoaksbaker.com

Jenny Oaks Baker (born Jenny June Oaks; May 27, 1975) is an American violinist. She has been nominated for a Grammy Award, and is a former member of the National Symphony Orchestra. Baker has released twenty studio albums, several of which have ranked high on the Billboard charts.

== Early life and education ==
Baker was born in Provo, Utah on May 27, 1975, to Dallin H. Oaks and June Oaks (née Dixon). She began playing the violin at age four, and made her solo orchestral debut in 1983 at the age of eight. She also won several competition awards in her youth.

She earned a Bachelor of Music degree in violin performance from Curtis Institute of Music in Philadelphia in 1997 and a Master of Music degree from Juilliard School in New York City in 1999.

== Career ==
With Shadow Mountain Records, she has released nineteen albums. Her first album, On Wings of Song (1998), was awarded two Pearl Awards from the FCMA. Her album, Wish Upon a Star: A Tribute to the Music of Walt Disney, received a Grammy Award nomination for Best Pop Instrumental Album at the 54th Grammy Awards. Several of her albums have listed on Billboard charts, including her 2010 album Then Sings My Soul; her 2012 album, Noël: Carols of Christmas Past which was produced and arranged by composer Kurt Bestor featuring vocalist Alex Sharpe; and her 2014 album Classic: The Rock Album.

She has performed as a soloist at Carnegie Hall, Lincoln Center, Strathmore Hall, the Library of Congress and as a guest soloist with the National Symphony, Jerusalem Symphony, Pittsburgh Symphony, San Diego Symphony, Utah Symphony, and the Tabernacle Choir at Temple Square. She has also been featured in television and radio broadcasts nationwide. Her BYUTV In Performance special, "Silver Screen Serenade", features Baker performing music from her 2008 album of the same name. She has collaborated with Gladys Knight, Marvin Hamlisch, Lisa Hopkins Seegmiller, Kurt Bestor, and former Secretary of State Condoleezza Rice.

Baker's music has been featured on the soundtracks of many films, including Helen Whitney's 2007 PBS documentary miniseries, The Mormons, T. C. Christensen's 2011 film, 17 Miracles and 2015 film The Cokeville Miracle, and Mitch Davis' 2015 film, Christmas Eve which also features her acting debut as the violinist character, Mandy.

Baker served as a judge for the 2007 Stradivarius International Violin Competition. In April 2008, Governor Jon M. Huntsman Jr. of Utah awarded her the Governor’s Mansion Artist Award for excellence in artistic expression.

For seven years, Baker performed as a first violinist in the National Symphony Orchestra before resigning in 2007 to devote more time to her family.

== Personal life ==
Baker is a daughter of Dallin H. Oaks and June Oaks (née Dixon). Her father is an attorney and former president of Brigham Young University, who served as a Utah Supreme Court justice, and became the president of the Church of Jesus Christ of Latter-day Saints (LDS Church) in October 2025. She is a member of the LDS Church and a 1993 alumna of East High School in Salt Lake City. On September 9, 2024, she joined pianist Jared Pierce to accompany Nathan Pacheco when he sang happy birthday to then-LDS Church president Russell M. Nelson at his 100th birthday celebration.

Baker is married to Matthew Baker. They live in Utah with their four children Laura, Hannah, Sarah, and Matthew Jr, who perform with her on two records and in concert as "Family Four".

== Discography ==
- On Wings of Song (1998)
- Songs My Mother Taught Me (1999)
- Where Love Is (2000)
- American Tapestry (2001)
- The Light Divine (2003)
- The Best of Jenny Oaks Baker (2005)
- O Holy Night (2007)
- Silver Screen Serenade (2008)
- Then Sings My Soul (2010)
- Wish Upon a Star: A Tribute to the Music of Walt Disney (2011)
- Noel: Carols of Christmas Past (2012)
- Classic: The Rock Album (2014)
- My Home Can Be a Holy Place (2015)
- Awakening (2016)
- Amazing Grace: Songs of Atonement (2016)
- The Spirit Of God: Classic Hymns and Spirituals (2018)
- Epic (2020)
- The Redeemer (2022)
- The Redeemer: Deluxe Edition (2025)

=== Jenny Oaks Baker & Family Four ===
- Jenny Oaks Baker & Family Four (2019)
- Joy to the World (2020)

== Filmography ==
Film
Year	Title	Role
2015	Christmas Eve	Mandy

== Awards and nominations ==
=== Grammy Awards ===
The Grammy Awards are awarded annually by the National Academy of Recording Arts and Sciences of the United States.

Year	Nominee / work	Award	Result
2012	Wish Upon a Star: A Tribute to the Music of Walt Disney	Best Pop Instrumental Album	Nominated

=== Other Awards ===
- Concerto Soloists National Young Artists String Competition - Winner
- National Music Camp Concerto Competition - Winner
- Utah Symphony Guild Competition - Winner
- Kingsville International String Competition - Honors
- Irving M. Klein International String Competition (1996) - Michaelian Prize
- Governor's Mansion Artist Award for Excellence in Artistic Expression (2008)
