= We Love Disney (2015 album) =

Compilation album by Various artists
- Released: October 30, 2015
- Recorded: September 2014 – August 2015
- Studios: Verve Studios, Santa Monica; Capitol Studios, Hollywood; Air Studios, London; Sunset Sound, Hollywood; Carrington House Studios, Burbank; Henson Studios, Los Angeles; The Village Studios, Los Angeles; The Grip Studio, Nashville; Red Bull Studios, London
- Genre: Pop
- Length: 46:24
- Labels: Verve; Walt Disney
- Producer: David Foster

We Love Disney series chronology
We Love Disney (2014)	We Love Disney (2015)	We Love Disney (2016)

We Love Disney is a 2015 compilation album and third entry in the We Love Disney series, featuring cover versions of Disney songs by English-speaking musicians from various genres. It was released by Verve Records and Walt Disney Records in the United States on October 30, 2015. Two editions of the album were released: a single-disc standard edition, and a digipak deluxe edition, containing two bonus tracks.

== Track listing ==
No.	Title	Artist	Length
1.	"Friend Like Me Original by: Robin Williams (1951 -2014)" (from Aladdin)	Ne-Yo	3:02
2.	"Part of Your World Original by: Jodi Benson" (from The Little Mermaid)	Jessie J	3:20
3.	"Can You Feel the Love Tonight/Nants Ingonyama Original by: Sir Elton John" (from The Lion King)	Jason Derulo	3:49
4.	"Rainbow Connection Original by: Jim Henson (1936 - 1990)" (from The Muppet Movie)	Gwen Stefani	3:24
5.	"Zero to Hero Original by: Lillias White, LaChanze, Roz Ryan and Cheryl Freeman." (from Hercules)	Ariana Grande	2:39
6.	"In a World of My Own / Very Good Advice Original by: Kathryn Beaumont" (from Alice in Wonderland)	Jhené Aiko	4:55
7.	"I Wan'na Be Like You (The Monkey Song) Original by: Louis Prima (1910 -1978) and Phil Harris (1904 - 1995)," (from The Jungle Book)	Fall Out Boy	3:19
8.	"Colors of the Wind Original by Vanessa Williams" (from Pocahontas)	Tori Kelly	4:06
9.	"A Spoonful of Sugar Original by: Julie Andrews" (from Mary Poppins)	Kacey Musgraves	3:38
10.	"Ev'rybody Wants to Be a Cat Original by: Scatman Crothers, Phil Harris, Thurl Ravenscroft, Liz English, Ruth Buzzi and Bill Thompson" (from The Aristocats)	Charles Perry	3:08
11.	"A Dream Is a Wish Your Heart Makes Original by: Ilene Woods 1929 - 2010" (from Cinderella)	Jessie Ware	3:54
12.	"Let It Go Original by: Idina Menzel and Demi Lovato" (from Frozen)	Rascal Flatts & Lucy Hale	4:07
13.	"It's a Small World the Official Team Park(from Disneyland) in Fantasyland"	Ne-Yo, Jessie J, Derulo, Stefani, Grande, Aiko, Fall Out Boy, Kelly, Musgraves, Perry, and Ware, Rascal Flatts & Hale	3:03
Total length:			46:24

Bonus tracks
No.	Title	Artist	Length
14.	"It's Not Easy Being Green" (from The Muppet Show)	Brenna Whitaker	3:55
15.	"A Whole New World Original by: Brad Kane and Lea Salonga" (from Aladdin)	Yuna	2:33
Total length:			52:52

Japan Bonus Tracks
No.	Title	Artist	Length
16.	"Colors of the Wind Cover Version Original by: Vanessa Williams" (from Pocahontas)	Sarah Àlainn	4:06

== Production ==
After a successful run with localized versions in France, Australia and Germany (titled "I Love Disney" for the latter), David Foster decided to produce a new compilation album for the United States market. During development, Foster created a wish list of American music artists for the album. Foster often choose the song he felt fit the artist's style and vocal abilities, although several artists, such as Ariana Grande, Jason Derulo, and Kacey Musgraves began with different songs before ultimately settling on their eventual selections. Lucy Hale was suggested at Disney's behest, as Hale also appears on the company's Hollywood Records roster.

We Love Disney is a co-production between Verve Records and Walt Disney Records, with Universal Music Group providing worldwide distribution and marketing from Disney Music Group, alongside Universal.

== Release ==
The album's release date was announced on August 14, 2015 at Disney's D23 Expo, where Ne-Yo performed "Friend Like Me" as part of the company's tribute to Robin Williams, who performed the original song in the film. A music video for Ne-Yo's cover was released on October 1, 2015. Later that year, Derulo, Grande, Kelly, Perry, and Aiko performed their selections from their album at the 2015 Disney Parks Christmas Day Parade.

=== Release history ===
Region	Date	Format(s)	Label
United States	October 30, 2015	CD; digital download; vinyl	Verve; Walt Disney

== Commercial performance ==
We Love Disney debuted at No. 8 on the US Billboard 200 chart with 31,000 album-equivalent units; it sold 26,000 copies in its first week, with the remainder of its unit total reflecting the album's streaming activity and track sales.

=== Charts ===
Chart (2015–16)	Peak position
Australian Albums (ARIA)	54
Austrian Albums (Ö3 Austria)	58
Belgian Albums (Ultratop Flanders)	44
Belgian Albums (Ultratop Wallonia)	74
Dutch Albums (Album Top 100)	16
French Albums (SNEP)	118
Swiss Albums (Schweizer Hitparade)	13
UK Compilation Albums (Official Charts)	15
US Billboard 200	8
