= We Love Disney =

Compilation album by various artists
- Released: 2013–2016
- Genre: Pop
- Label: Mercury; Universal Music; Verve

We Love Disney is a compilation series that features cover versions of Disney songs by contemporary artists. It is the successor to the Disneymania series of albums that were released from 2002 to 2010. The first album of the series was released in France in 2013. The second album was released in Australia in 2014 and included songs such as "Let It Go" (from Frozen) and "Baby Mine" (from Dumbo) and such artists as Dannii Minogue and The McClymonts. A 2015 release was released in the United States by Verve Records, with production by David Foster.

== History ==
The first album in the series was released in France in 2013. The project was led by Mercury/Universal and included collaborations from artists that included Élodie Frégé and Ben l'Oncle Soul. It became the fourteenth best selling album in France in 2013. It charted in numerous countries, including #2 in Belgium, #2 in France, and #8 in Switzerland.

The second album in the series was released in Australia in November 2014, debuting at number 69 on the Australia Album Chart. The album includes such Disney songs as "Let It Go" (from Frozen) and "Baby Mine" (from Dumbo) and such artists as Dannii Minogue and The McClymonts.

The third album was released in the United States in October 2015. It is produced by David Foster, current chairman of Verve Records. The album features musicians from various genres, including country, pop, rock, and R&B.

In February 2016, a Latin American version with Spanish-speaking singers was announced. The first single released was a Spanish version of "Circle of Life" from The Lion King, performed by Mexican singer Alejandro Fernandez and featuring his daughter Camila.

=== Release history ===
- 2013:
  - We Love Disney, France
- 2014:
  - We Love Disney, Australia
  - We Love Disney 2, France
- 2015:
  - We Love Disney, United States
  - We Love Disney, Indonesia
  - We Love Disney, Italy
  - We Love Disney Best-Of, France
  - I Love Disney, Germany
- 2016:
  - We Love Disney, Latin America
  - Everybody Loves Disney, United States
  - We Love Disney 3, France
  - Jazz Loves Disney, France & United States
- 2017:
  - Jazz Loves Disney 2 – A Kind of Magic, France & United States
- 2019:
  - We Love Disney, Sweden
- 2021:
  - Jazz Loves Disney (Deluxe), France

== Chart history ==
=== We Love Disney (2013 album) ===
Chart (2013 - 2014)	Peak position
Ultrapop 200 (Belgium)	2
French album	2
Swiss album	8

=== We Love Disney (2014 album) ===
Chart (2014)	Peak position
Australian Albums Chart	66

=== We Love Disney (2015 album) ===
Chart (2015)	Peak position
Australian Albums (ARIA)	54
Belgian Albums (Ultratop Flanders)	44
Belgian Albums (Ultratop Wallonia)	80
US Billboard 200	8

=== We Love Disney (2016 album) ===
Chart (2016)	Peak position
US Top Latin Albums (Billboard)	4
