= Baby Mine (song) =

Song by Betty Noyes
- Released: 1941
- Genre: Lullaby, ballad
- Length: 2:05
- Composer: Frank Churchill
- Lyricist: Ned Washington

"Baby Mine" is a song from the 1941 Disney animated feature Dumbo. The music is by Frank Churchill, with lyrics by Ned Washington. Betty Noyes recorded the vocals for the original film version. In the film, Dumbo's mother, Mrs. Jumbo, an elephant locked in a circus wagon, cradles her baby Dumbo with her trunk while this lullaby is sung. It is also the last appearance of the circus animals.

The song was nominated for an Academy Award for Best Original Song at the 14th Academy Awards in 1942. It is also listed on AFI's list of 400 nominated songs for "100 Years... 100 Songs" as one of America's greatest film songs, but did not make the cut.

== Recordings and cover versions ==
Early popular recordings include those by Les Brown, Glenn Miller, and Jane Froman, followed by several others; and decades later, the song regained attention. Bette Midler covered the song on the 1988 Beaches soundtrack. In the same year, Bonnie Raitt and Was (Not Was) recorded the song for the album, Stay Awake: Various Interpretations of Music from Vintage Disney Films.

Alison Krauss recorded the song for the 1996 album The Best of Country Sing the Best of Disney. Her version peaked at number 82 on the RPM Country Tracks chart in Canada. Krauss' cover earned her a Grammy nomination for Best Female Country Vocal Performance in 1997.

An instrumental version by violinist Jenny Oaks Baker was included in the Grammy-nominated (Note: Grammy Award for Best Pop Instrumental Album 54th Grammy Awards (Nominated; 2012)) album Wish Upon a Star, released in 2011.

Brian Wilson recorded his own arrangement of "Baby Mine" on his Disney cover album In the Key of Disney in 2011.

English singer Lily Allen credits being encouraged to perform the song in a school assembly with the beginning of her interest in becoming a professional musician.

The song is used recurrently in the AMC television drama Halt and Catch Fire as a lullaby that Donna Clark (Kerry Bishé) sings to her daughters.

Sharon Rooney and Arcade Fire covered the song for the 2019 live-action remake of Dumbo, while Norwegian singer Aurora performed the song for the teaser trailer.
