= Colors of the Wind =

Song from the Disney film Pocahontas (1995)

Song by Judy Kuhn

from the album Pocahontas: An Original Walt Disney Records Soundtrack
- Released: May 30, 1995
- Genre: Show tune
- Length: 3:34
- Label: Walt Disney
- Composer: Alan Menken
- Lyricist: Stephen Schwartz
- Producers: Alan Menken; Stephen Schwartz

Licensed clip
- "Colors of the Wind" (from Pocahontas) on YouTube

"Colors of the Wind" is a song written by composer Alan Menken and lyricist Stephen Schwartz for Walt Disney Pictures' 33rd animated feature film Pocahontas (1995). The film's theme song, "Colors of the Wind", was originally recorded by American singer and actress Judy Kuhn in her role as the singing voice of Pocahontas. A pop ballad, the song's lyrics are about animism and respecting nature, finding its roots in indigenous Native American culture, perspectives which have later been adopted in both transcendentalist literature and New Age spirituality.

"Colors of the Wind" received a mostly positive reception from critics, with several citing it as one of the best songs from a Disney film. The song would go on to win the Academy Award for Best Original Song, the Grammy Award for Best Song Written for a Motion Picture, Television or Other Visual Media, and the Golden Globe Award for Best Original Song. American actress and singer Vanessa Williams's version of the song, which plays during the end credits, was released as the lead single on June 6, 1995, by Walt Disney Records from the film's soundtrack, and became a top ten hit on the Billboard Hot 100. The song was also included on the 1995 re-release of her third studio album, The Sweetest Days (1994). "Colors of the Wind" would also be covered by other artists, including Ashanti and Brian Wilson, and was featured on an episode of Lip Sync Battle.

== Background ==
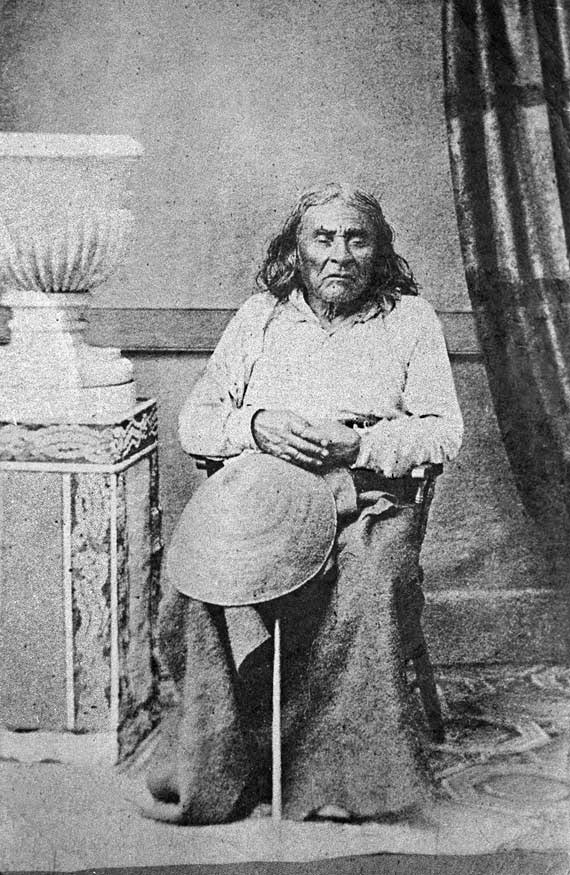
The song was inspired by the words of Chief Seattle.

Following the death of Howard Ashman, the Walt Disney Company wanted to find another musician to collaborate with Alan Menken on his scores for animated films. Stephen Schwartz, the composer behind the Broadway theater hits Godspell (1971), Pippin (1972), and The Magic Show (1974), received a call from the company asking if he would like to collaborate with Menken. Schwartz had never considered working in the film industry, but agreed to do so nonetheless. Schwartz did not feel he was well-suited to the job.

Schwartz wanted to write a song for the film wherein Pocahontas confronts the Eurocentrism of John Smith. "Colors of the Wind" was the first song written for Pocahontas. According to Schwartz, the song "influence[d] the development of the rest of the film." Schwartz said that "a story-board outline was in place before we wrote [the track]. This is often the process in animation, at least as I've experienced it, where everybody works from an outline and each succeeding piece of material, whether it is a song or drawings, influences the next." The track was inspired by Native American poetry, music and folklore, as well as a now-debunked letter that Schwartz believed was sent to the United States Congress by Chief Seattle regarding humanity's relationship with nature but was in fact a fabrication. Part of the letter reads: "The wind that gave our grandfather his first breath also received his last sigh. The wind also gives our children the spirit of life. So if we sell our land, you must keep it apart and sacred, as a place where man can go to taste the wind that is sweetened by the meadow flowers." This portion of the letter inspired the song's title, which Schwartz liked because he saw it as paradoxical and thought-provoking.

Schwartz also drew inspiration for "Colors of the Wind" from the music of Oscar Hammerstein II and Sheldon Harnick, as it deals with issues of prejudice. Menken said that while "Colors of the Wind" was "born out of the modality of Native American music...it quickly moved to its own place, which is hard to define." Menken has noted that the song lacks humor, which he and Schwartz attempted to inject into Pocahontas and failed. Initially, the final lines of the song were "For your life's an empty hull/till you get it through your skull/you can paint with all the colors of the wind." Menken disapproved of these lyrics and asked Schwartz to rewrite them; Schwartz changed the lines to "You can own the Earth, and still/all you'll own is earth until/you can paint with all the colors of the wind." Schwartz preferred the altered lyrics. Schwartz said that this incident taught him the lesson: "If your collaborator is unhappy, it's probably because [the song] needs to be better," adding that he may not have won an Academy Award if he did not change the lyrics. Menken views "Colors of the Wind" as one of the most important songs he has written. Schwartz believed that the Walt Disney Company would reject "Colors of the Wind" for being philosophical and different from previous Disney songs. Judy Kuhn sang the song to help "pitch" Schwartz's score to Disney, and the studio embraced the track. Schwartz and Menken became friends, and later wrote music for the Disney films The Hunchback of Notre Dame (1996) and Enchanted (2007) together.

== Composition and lyrics ==
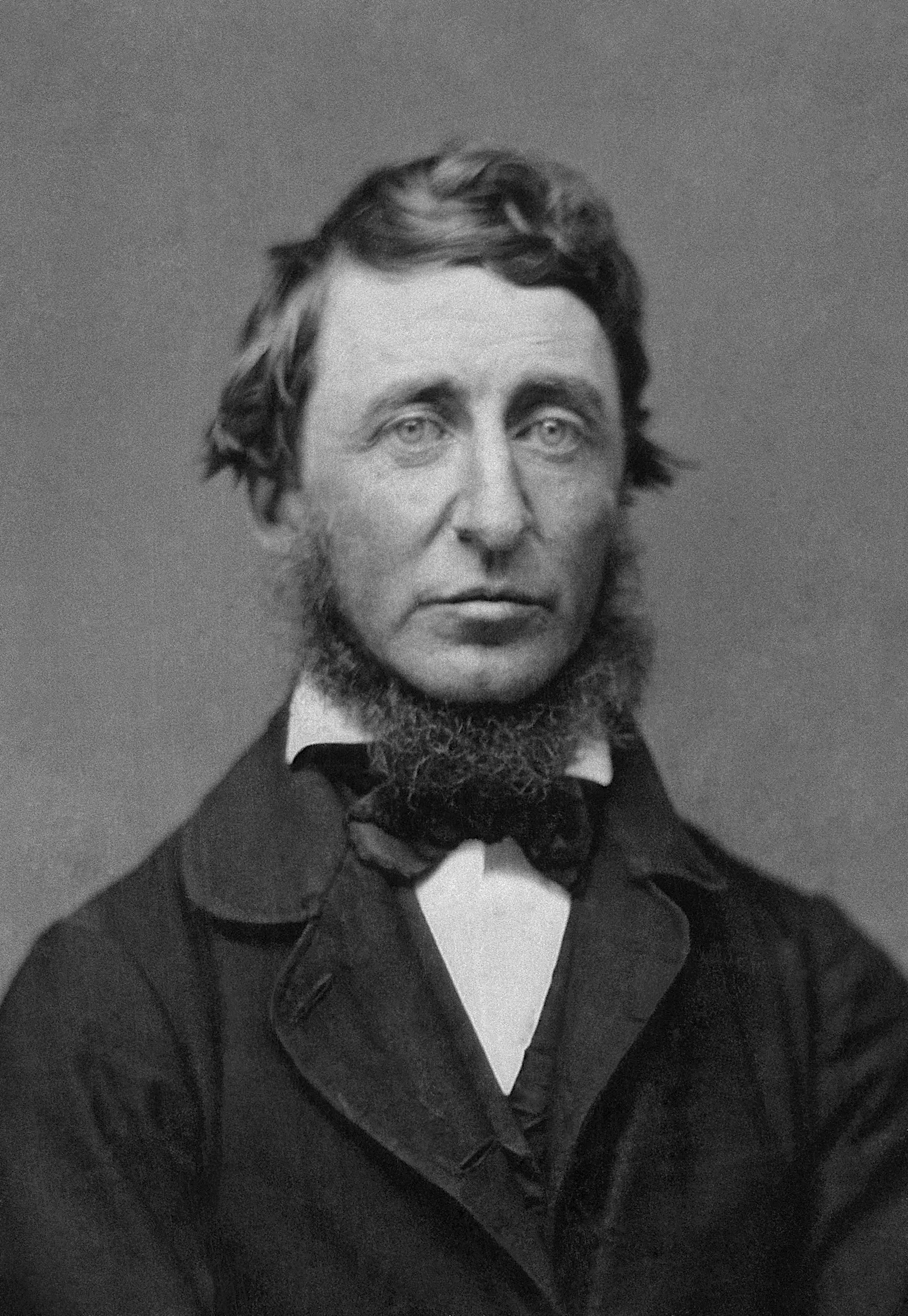
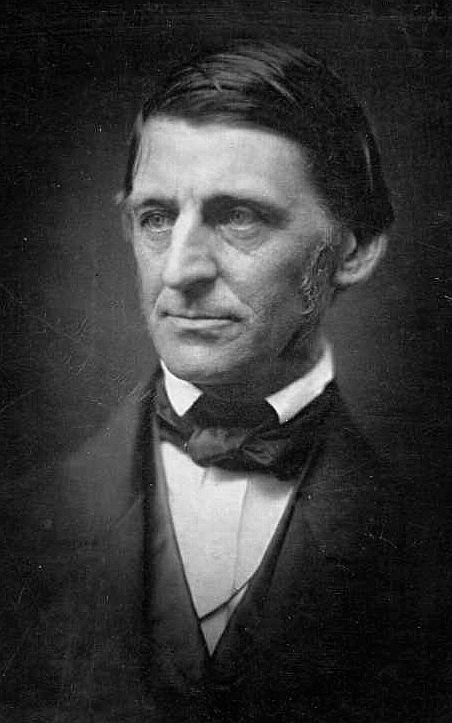
"Colors of the Wind" has been compared to the writings of transcendentalists Henry David Thoreau (left) and Ralph Waldo Emerson (right).

"Colors of the Wind" (film version) by Judy Kuhn

"Colors of the Wind" is a pop ballad written by Alan Menken and Stephen Schwartz and performed by Judy Kuhn. It has a length of three minutes and thirty-four seconds. According to the Orlando Sentinel, the song does not resemble Native American music. Nonetheless, adding a twist of creative license, the sentiment of First Nation Peoples' relationship to the land and its animals, as well as the contrast between colonialist and indigenous mindsets, are strikingly well portrayed, considering the lyricist's non-indigenous background. The song is about animism and having respect for nature. It features lyrics about painting with "all the colors of the wind" and singing with "all the voices of the mountain."

Justyna Fruzińska wrote in Emerson Goes to the Movies: Individualism in Walt Disney Company's Post-1989 Animated Films that the lyrics of "Colors of the Wind" are reminiscent of the writings of transcendentalist Ralph Waldo Emerson and New Age spirituality. The staff of Billboard likened the lyrics of "Colors of the Wind" to a public service announcement about embracing diversity. Sonically, Rita Kempley of The Washington Post found "Colors of the Wind" akin to music from Busby Berkeley films and The Little Mermaid (1989).

The song also features a mention of a "blue corn moon"; although in general the blue-green distinction is ambiguous in many languages. Responding to a fan inquiry, Schwartz admitted that he coined the phrase after reading a Native American love poem which read: "I will come to you in the moon of green corn"; Native Americans referred to months as "moons" and named them after events that happened seasonally, such as the sprouting of green corn. This system was subsequently appropriated by colonists, and a modified version appears in the Farmers' Almanac. Schwartz disliked the phrase "green corn moon" due to the sound of the word "green" and because he felt it might evoke the urban legend that the Moon is made of green cheese. Instead, Schwartz used the phrase "blue corn moon" as it reminded him of both blue moons and blue corn tortillas. Schwartz thought that the phrase might evoke the Indigenous peoples of the Southeastern Woodlands rather than the Algonquian people depicted in Pocahontas, but was satisfied with it anyway.

== International versions ==
The 10th anniversary edition DVD release of the movie features a multi-language clip reel presenting the song "Colors of the Wind" in 11 of the 28 versions originally released for the movie, with an introduction by director Mike Gabriel.

== Reception ==
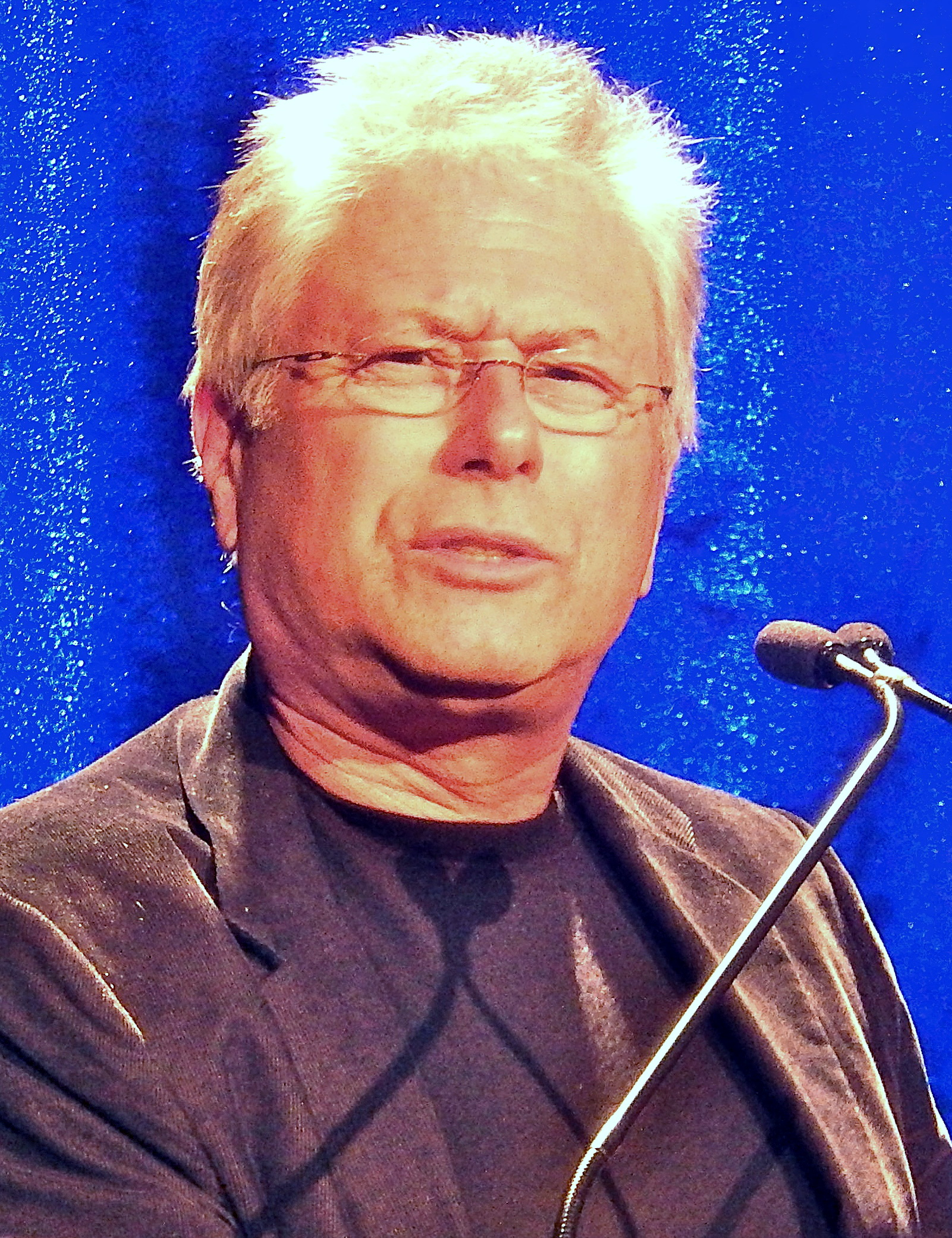
Alan Menken's songwriting received mixed reviews.

Dominick Suzanne-Mayer of Consequence of Sound praised the track for featuring "surprisingly cutting" lyrics, "pointed commentary on racism, and a dynamic, soulful performance from Judy Kuhn all in one place." Time's Raisa Bruner deemed "Colors of the Wind" one of the "powerful, uplifting theme songs" from the Disney Renaissance and a "classic". Jordan Appugliesi of Mic ranked it the sixth best song from a Disney soundtrack, saying that it is "a poignant, memorable ballad" in the vein of "Reflection" from Mulan (1998). Rita Kempler of The Washington Post felt that the "stirring anthem" is the song from Pocahontas which "comes closest to a show-stopper." The staff of Billboard called the song "artistic" and "wistful" and ranked it the ninth best song of the Disney Renaissance. Writing for The Austin Chronicle, Hollis Chacona opined "Unlike so many film composers of late, Menken knows when to keep quiet and when to let loose his powerful score. That power soars through its centerpiece (and no doubt Oscar-bound) song, 'Colors of the Wind,' performed by Judy Kuhn."

Dorkys Ramos of Time Out said that the song and "When You Wish Upon a Star" from Pinocchio (1940) are "at the top of our list when it comes to songs we don't tire of hearing again and again." Spin's Andrew Unterberger criticized the track's "patronizing" portrayal of Native American beliefs, but said that "man...Judy Kuhn's voice soars, with those little trills and sweeping highs. It makes it much easier to get behind what's ultimately an agreeable message of environmental awareness and acceptance." Aylin Zafar of BuzzFeed ranked "Colors of the Wind" the ninth best Disney song, commending it for "encourag[ing] people to appreciate the world around them and to seek to understand others before judging them." Screen Rant's Turner Minton viewed "Colors of the Wind" as the tenth best Disney song and "an anthem about the harmonious nature of the shared world which embraces all races of people."

Charles Solomon of the Los Angeles Times viewed "Colors of the Wind" and "When She Loved Me" from Toy Story 2 (1999) as the only Disney songs released since Howard Ashman's death which "approached the standards" of the music from Beauty and the Beast (1991) and Aladdin (1992). The staff of People said that the track is "performed effectively within the body of the film by Kuhn". CollegeHumor's Willie Muse wrote that "even though Pocahontas as a whole is completely forgettable, I guarantee everyone reading this knows every single lyric of ["Colors of the Wind"]. Beautiful to listen to and epic in its scope, 'Colors of the Wind' transcends the movie that birthed it to earn its place as an undeniable classic." Janet Maslin of The New York Times deemed the song "heartfelt" but less catchy than previous Disney songs. Owen Gleiberman of Entertainment Weekly stated that Pocahontas' "Alan Menken-Stephen Schwartz songs have all the flavor of uncooked dough". Peter Travers of Rolling Stone criticized the song for its "political correctness" and for "sermoniz[ing] about ecology by using pedestrian conceits". The track won the Academy Award for Best Original Song, the Golden Globe Award for Best Original Song, and the Grammy Award for Best Song Written for Visual Media.

== Certifications ==
Region	Certification	Certified units/sales
United Kingdom (BPI)	Gold	400,000^{‡}
United States (RIAA)	2× Platinum	2,000,000^{‡}
^{‡} Sales+streaming figures based on certification alone.

== Vanessa Williams version ==
"Colors of the Wind"

Single by Vanessa Williams

from the album Pocahontas: An Original Walt Disney Records Soundtrack and The Sweetest Days
- B-side: "Listen to Your Heart II"; "I'll Never See Him Again"
- Released: June 6, 1995
- Genre: Pop
- Length: 4:17
- Label: Walt Disney; Hollywood
- Composer: Alan Menken
- Lyricist: Stephen Schwartz
- Producer: Keith Thomas

Vanessa Williams singles chronology
"The Way That You Love" (1995)	"Colors of the Wind" (1995)	"You Can't Run" (1995)

Audio video
- "Colors Of The Wind - End Title" on YouTube

=== Background and composition ===
Vanessa Williams was chosen to perform "Colors of the Wind" due to the success of her Grammy Award-nominated single "Save the Best for Last". Williams' cover is a pop song which omits the opening lyrics of the original version of the track. The cover features Bill Miller playing the Native American flute. Scott Mendelson of Forbes wrote that Williams' cover "was considered an 'all is forgiven' note" following the removal of her Miss America title. The cover was produced by Keith Thomas, who also arranged it with musician Robbie Buchanan. It was a commercial success, reaching number four on the Billboard Hot 100 chart and reaching number two on the Adult Contemporary chart, almost close to become Williams' second single to top this chart. It was also included the 1995 re-release of her third studio album, The Sweetest Days (1994).

Williams performed a Spanish version of the song which was included as the single's b-side. The Spanish version of the song featured in the film was sung by Mexican singer and actress Susana Zabaleta.

At the Grammy Awards in 1996, the song received a Grammy Award nomination for Best Female Pop Vocal Performance.

=== Critical reception ===
Raisa Bruner of Time said that Williams' rendition was "performed flawlessly", adding that "The powerful Pocahontas song finds the crystal-clear voice of Vanessa Williams painting a vision of 17th-century Native American life—and the importance of the environment—that still resonates with audiences today." Bruner said that the cover stood alongside Elton John's version of "Can You Feel the Love Tonight" from The Lion King (1994) as one of "the best radio-ready versions of Disney's finest melodies". MTV's Jessica Norton felt that the cover is "even more magical" than the original and "fitting...for free-spirited 'Nessa to cover." The staff of People opined that the song is "not well served by the former Miss America’s pop diva turn. Indeed, her overblown interpretation seems directly at odds with the song’s message. Stay tuned to Kuhn."

=== Credits and personnel ===
- Vanessa Williams: lead vocals
- Alan Menken: composer
- Stephen Schwartz: lyricist
- Robbie Buchanan: arranger, keyboards
- Keith Thomas: producer, arranger, additional keyboards, synthesizers, drum programming, bass synth
- Mark Hammond: drum programming
- Jerry McPherson: guitars
- Bill Miller: flute
- Ronn Huff: orchestra arrangements
- The Nashville String Machine: orchestra

=== Charts ===
==== Weekly charts ====
Chart (1995–1996)	Peak position
Australia (ARIA)	16
Belgium (Ultratop 50 Flanders)	38
Canada Top Singles (RPM)	11
Canada Adult Contemporary (RPM)	1
Iceland (Íslenski Listinn Topp 40)	16
Ireland (IRMA)	16
Israel (Israeli Singles Chart)	1
Netherlands (Dutch Top 40)	9
Netherlands (Single Top 100)	8
New Zealand (Recorded Music NZ)	25
Panama (UPI)	8
Scottish Singles Sales (Official Charts)	21
UK Singles (Official Charts)	21
US Billboard Hot 100	4
US Adult Contemporary (Billboard)	2
US Adult Pop Airplay (Billboard)	10
US Hot R&B/Hip-Hop Songs (Billboard)	53
US Pop Airplay (Billboard)	18
US Rhythmic Airplay (Billboard)	37
US Cash Box Top 100	6

==== Year-end charts ====
Chart (1995)	Position
Israel (Israeli Singles Chart)	27
US Billboard Hot 100	31
US Adult Contemporary (Billboard)	14
US Cash Box Top 100	42

=== Certifications ===
Region	Certification	Certified units/sales
United States (RIAA)	Gold	700,000

=== Release history ===
Region	Date	Format(s)	Label(s)	Ref.
United States	May 31, 1995	Top 40; adult contemporary; R&B; Spanish; talk radio	Walt Disney; Hollywood	
United States	June 6, 1995	7-inch vinyl; CD; cassette	Walt Disney; Hollywood	
Japan	June 21, 1995	Mini-CD	Walt Disney	
United Kingdom	September 4, 1995	7-inch vinyl; CD; cassette	Walt Disney	

== Other covers ==
A French version has been recorded under the title "L'air du vent" by duo Native (1995); released as a single in November that year, it peaked at number nine in France and charted for 15 weeks in the top 50, and peaked at number five in the Walloon region of Belgium and charted for 22 weeks in the top 40. Actor and singer Michael Crawford covered "Colors of the Wind" on The Disney Album (2001). The album Disneymania (2002) includes Ashanti's version of the song. Actress Christy Carlson Romano covered the song for her debut EP Greatest Disney TV & Film Hits (2004). Actress and singer Vanessa Hudgens covered the song for Disneymania 5 (2007). Brian Wilson released a funk-influenced version of "Colors of the Wind" on his album In the Key of Disney (2011). American singer Tori Kelly's rendition of the song was included on the album We Love Disney (2015). Kelly decided to cover the song because she was obsessed with Pocahontas as a child. She also sang it for The Disney Family Singalong in 2020 due to the COVID awareness. The Chipettes covered the song for the 1995 album When You Wish Upon a Chipmunk. Australian soprano Mirusia Louwerse covered "Colors of the Wind" for This Time Tomorrow (2016), her fourth solo album. The singer's arrangement has been described as featuring "a simple and unobtrusive accompaniment on acoustic guitar." Postmodern Jukebox, a musical collective that creates vintage-style covers of popular songs, released a cover of the song in the style of 1970s soul music. German band Tokio Hotel covered the song for the Disney pop-punk cover album A Whole New Sound (2024).

== Usage in media ==
Actress Melissa McCarthy lip synced the song during an episode of Lip Sync Battle. Before lip syncing the track, McCarthy donned protective goggles. Then a high-powered wind machine blew water, stuffed animals, confetti, streamers and fake leaves at her as the song played. The performance received a standing ovation, and Jimmy Fallon deemed her the winner of the battle.

The song's opening and closing bars are used for the jingle of Steve Wright's Sunday Love Songs on BBC Radio 2.

== Bibliography ==
- Fruzińska, Justyna (2014). Emerson Goes to the Movies: Individualism in Walt Disney Company's Post-1989 Animated Films. Cambridge Scholars Publishing. ISBN 978-1-4438-6657-6.
- Laird, Paul (2014). The Musical Theater of Stephen Schwartz: From Godspell to Wicked and Beyond. Rowman & Littlefield Publishers. ISBN 978-0810891913.
