= Survivor (Vanessa Williams album) =

2024 studio album by Vanessa Williams

Studio album by Vanessa Williams
- Released: August 23, 2024
- Genre: R&B
- Length: 47:50
- Label: Mellian; WMG
- Producer: John "J-C" Carr; Bill Coleman; Liz Curtis; André Cymone; Lucas Goodman; Christopher Hall; DeValle Hayes; Jillian Hervey; Henry Hey; Mel Holder; Cyril Holland; Loris Holland; Chantry Johnson; Kipper Jones; Missael Manon; Mic Murphy; Tony Prendatt; Vanessa Williams

Vanessa Williams chronology
The Real Thing (2009)	Survivor (2024)

Singles from Survivor
- 1. "Legs (Keep Dancing)" Released: April 26, 2024; 2. "Bop!" Released: July 26, 2024; 3. "iLike Moonlight" Released: August 16, 2024

Survivor is the ninth studio album by American singer and actress Vanessa Williams. It was released under her own record label Mellian Music on August 23, 2024. It is her first studio album in over 15 years since 2009's The Real Thing (2009). The album was preceded by the singles, "Legs (Keep Dancing)", "Bop!" (featuring Trixie Mattel and Lion Babe), and "iLike Moonlight". The photo for the album cover was shot by Mike Ruiz.

== Background ==
Speaking to Deborah Evans Price of Woman's World William's opened up about the decision to release Survivor independently going on to say: “I had been in talks with a few labels on the record side and a lot of labels have disappeared, disintegrated. Everyone is consolidating, not very many people are getting signed...before COVID, I went into the studio and said, ‘You know what? I’m going to pay for it myself and just start recording. I want to do songs that matter to me for my life.’”

== Critical reception ==
Peter Piatkowski of PopMatters rated the album a 7 out of 10, noting that "despite the long absence from music, Williams has returned without missing a step." while also declaring "Williams thrives on being an old-school Entertainer with a capital E."

== Track listing ==
Survivor track listing
No.	Title	Writer(s)	Producer(s)	Length
1.	"iLike Moonlight"	DeValle Hayes; Cyril Holland; Amber Mitchell	Hayes; C. Holland	4:17
2.	"Legs (Keep Dancing)"	Vanessa Williams; Chantry Johnson; Kevin Jones; Kjersti Long	Johnson; Kipper Jones	3:07
3.	"Bop!" (featuring Trixie Mattel and Lion Babe)	Lucas Goodman; Jillian Hervey; Melvin Holder; Jones; Thurston O'Neal	Mel Holder; Kipper Jones; Hervey; Goodman; Christopher Hall; Liz Curtis	3:26
4.	"Survivor"	Hayes; C. Holland; Mitchell	Hall; Hayes; Curtis; Loris Holland	3:28
5.	"La Costa"	Natalie Cole; Linda Williams	Hall; Henry Hey; Curtis	3:58
6.	"Vuelve" (featuring Missael Manon)	V. Williams; Anthony Almonte; Anthony T. Prendatt; Missael Manon	V. Williams; Hall; Curtis; Manon; Tony Prendatt	4:14
7.	"Junk Man"	Frank Loesser; Joseph Meyer	Hall; Hey; Curtis	4:09
8.	"Zaz Zuh Zaz" (featuring Wynton Marsalis)	Cab Calloway; Harry White	Hall; Hey; Curtis	3:40
9.	"Come Dance with Me"	Sammy Cahn; Jimmy Van Heusen	Hall; Hey; Curtis	3:04
10.	"On the Other Side of the Tracks"	Cy Coleman; Carolyn Leigh	Hall; Hey; Curtis	2:24
11.	"Here's to You"	Holder; Jones	Hall; Kipper Jones; Curtis; Holder	3:10
12.	"I See You"	V. Williams; Andre Anderson; Jones; Michael Murphy	André Cymone; Hall; Kipper Jones; Curtis; Mic Murphy	2:40
13.	"Being Good Isn't Good Enough"	Betty Comden; Adolph Green; Jule Styne	Hall; Curtis	3:52
14.	"Come Dance with Me" (John "J-C" Carr & Bill Coleman 808 Beach Jukebox Remix)	Cahn; Van Heusen	Bill Coleman; Hall; Hey; John "J-C" Carr; Curtis	2:21
Total length:				47:50

== Personnel ==
Musicians

- Vanessa Williams – vocals
- Tanya Riley – vocals (tracks 1, 3, 4)
- Loris Holland – keyboards, vocals (tracks 1, 4)
- DeValle Hayes – programming (tracks 1, 4)
- Dana Harding – guitar (track 1)
- Kipper Jones – vocals (tracks 2, 3, 11, 12), programming (12)
- Chandry Johnson – keyboards, programming (track 2)
- Mel Holder – programming (tracks 3, 11); bass, keyboards, saxophone (3); all instruments (11)
- Lucas Goodman – keyboards, programming, vocals (track 3)
- John Henry Smith – guitar (track 3)
- Jillian Hervey – vocals (track 3)
- Sherie Murphy – vocals (track 3)
- Trixie Mattel – vocals (track 3)
- Cindy Mizzelle – vocals (track 4)
- J.T. Lewis – drums (tracks 5, 8–10, 13, 14), guitar (7), vocals (8), shaker (10)
- Keith Robinson – guitar (tracks 5, 8–10, 13, 14), vocals (8)
- Romero Lubambo – guitar (tracks 5, 6)
- Roger Squitero – percussion (tracks 5, 6)
- Henry Hey – piano (tracks 5, 7–10, 13, 14); Hammond organ, organ (7); vocals (8)
- Carl Carter – electric bass (track 5)
- Grégoire Maret – harmonica (track 5)
- Isaac Raz – programming (track 5)
- Darius de Haas – vocals (track 5)
- Missael Manon – programming, vocals (track 6)
- Charles Pillow – saxophone (track 6)
- John Wheeler – trombone (track 6)
- John Owens – trumpet (track 6)
- Tony Kadleck – trumpet (track 6)
- Marissa Licata – violin (track 6)
- Al Caldwell – bass (tracks 7–10, 13, 14), vocals (8)
- Wynton Marsalis – trumpet, vocals (track 8)
- The Black Bettys – vocals (tracks 11, 12)
- Johnnie Ray Kornegay III – vocals (track 11)
- Mary Lee Joshua – vocals (track 11)
- André Cymone – programming (track 12)
- Mic Murphy – programming, vocals (track 12)
- Genesis Amaris – vocals (track 12)
- Carter Brey – cello (track 13)
- Bill Coleman – remixing, programming (track 14)
- John "J-C" Carr – remixing, programming (track 14)

Technical

- Tatsuya Sato – mastering, engineering
- Tony Prendatt – mixing, engineering (tracks 1, 3–6, 12); arrangement (5, 6)
- Dave Darlington – mixing, engineering (tracks 5, 7–10, 13, 14)
- DeValle Hayes – engineering (tracks 1, 4), arrangement (1)
- Loris Holland – engineering (tracks 1, 4), arrangement (1)
- Chantry Johnson – engineering (track 2)
- Hank Kalleen – engineering (track 3)
- Lucas Goodman – engineering (track 3)
- Henry Hey – engineering (track 5), arrangement (5, 7–10)
- Kipper Jones – engineering (track 12), arrangement (3, 12)
- André Cymone – engineering, arrangement (track 12)
- Mic Murphy – engineering, arrangement (track 12)
- John "J-C" Carr – engineering (track 14)
- Vanessa Williams – arrangement (tracks 3, 6)
- Jillian Hervey – arrangement (track 3)
- Trixie Mattel – arrangement (track 3)
- John Kiehl – arrangement (track 6)
- Missael Manon – arrangement (track 6)
