= Crugie =

American singer-songwriter; guitarist; visual artist

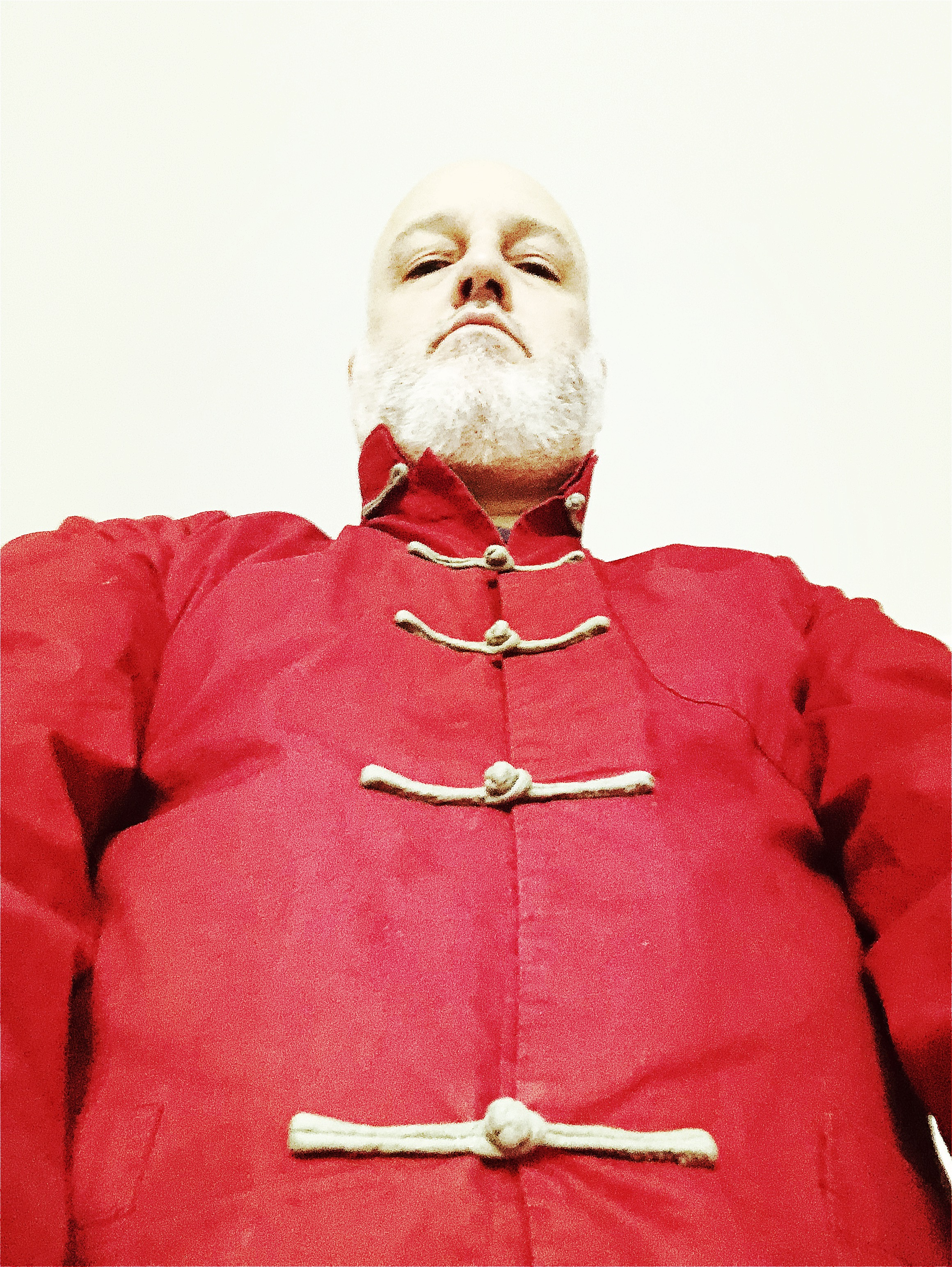

Background information
- Born: Christopher Riccio; Princeton, New Jersey
- Genres: Rock, punk, alternative rock
- Occupations: Musician, songwriter, visual artist
- Labels: Sector 2 Records, What Are Records?, Sniff These Records

Crugie (born Christopher Riccio) is a Princeton, NJ-bred guitarist, singer-songwriter, and visual artist who worked in the '90s Hoboken rock scene fronting Cycomotogoat, wrote and co-wrote songs on John Popper's solo album Zygote, and co-starred in Cory McAbee's cult sci-fi film Stingray Sam. He currently produces music as half of the NY songwriting duo Super User Friendly.

== Career ==
Crugie formed punk band The Disturbed in 1981 in Princeton, NJ with drummer "Stroller" Ben White and bass player Dave Wilder. The band played at local high schools, Princeton University eating clubs, Maxwell's in Hoboken, CBGB in New York, and the Princeton "Teen Cafe." After graduating from high school in 1986, the band moved to Providence, RI and played local clubs like Rocket. They released the 8-song EP Totalled Volvo in 1987. Kirk Dominguez of the punk fanzine Flipside said of the record "These Disturbed lads pound out inspiring pop punk-a-billy in a very unpretentious [way]." Pat Fear of the band White Flag wrote "Fun smart alec surf punk by some fun, smart ass surfy kids." In March 2022, a song from Totalled Volvo was played on the BBC Radio 6 Music program The Collection. The album was chosen for the episode by DJ and electronic musician LCY from the late BBC DJ John Peel's home music collection containing "tens of thousands of records."

In 1988, Crugie co-created the power trio the Bah Gah Brothers with drummer Sanjay Khanna and The Disturbed bass player Dave Wilder (who later co-wrote songs and played with Macy Gray). After recording initial demos, Wilder departed and was replaced on bass by Dave Ares. The Bah Gahs released Is There a Doctor in the Fish?! in 1990. The band later became known as Cycomotogoat with Khanna and Dave Maltby (later of Dog Eat Dog) sharing drumming duties until the arrival of Tom Costagliola in 1993. The band's 1992 self-titled, self-released EP features guest performances by harmonicist John Popper and violinist Emilio DiZefalo-China of Hoboken, NJ rap rock group Sweet Lizard Illtet. Cycomotogoat signed with Sector 2 Records and released Alkaline in 1994. The album Braille followed in 1996 on What Are Records? with keyboard player Rob Clores as a full-time band member. Cycomotogoat toured with the annual summer festival H.O.R.D.E. from 1993 to 1996. Cycomotogoat's home base, known as The Goat Ranch (among other names), was "a self-made studio in Hoboken, NJ. The foursome took an abandoned gas station and turned it into an apartment house, complete with a multi-track studio."

In 1999, Crugie and John Popper, friends from their high school years in Princeton, worked together on Popper's solo album Zygote. Crugie's Cycomotogoat bandmates, bassist Dave Ares and keyboardist Rob Clores, along with Dave Matthews Band drummer Carter Beauford, filled out the backing band for the recording. The group toured with a different drummer, Aubrey Dayle (from God Street Wine), as the John Popper Band. Crugie wrote the song "Tip the Domino" and the music for "Lunatic" and "Open Letter." Of Crugie's musicianship, Popper said "...there's something about the way he plays that just inspires people around him. He has a very innocent approach. He cuts right through things. He can feel things in four-and-a-half (time) that I can't feel, and I'm pretty good. So he can play in four-and-a-half, which is hard to do."

Crugie released the concept album Tinkerman Project in 2007. The album features a comedic audio tale about a space alien on Earth interspersed with songs by Crugie and his coproducer, G'nu Fuz and Poverty Hash frontman Joe Roberto. Crugie and Joe later appeared together in Cory McAbee's Stingray Sam.

In 2008, Crugie joined Cory McAbee's "cabaret-comedy rock band the Billy Nayer Show." McAbee said, "...we brought Crugie onboard, who did a tour with us years back... and decided that Crugie should be a member of the band and a musical collaborator." Crugie was cast as The Quasar Kid in McAbee's 2009 musical space Western movie serial parody Stingray Sam. Crugie sings his song "Get It Started" (from Tinkerman Project) in the movie. The song complemented McAbee's casting choice. "Crugie plays the Quasar Kid in the movie, but as a musician he’s also written his own songs, so I chose one of his songs that fit the Quasar Kid better, musically performed by us as the band."

Crugie paints and creates collage art under the name Galapagos Creation Machine. His facial collages are featured during the performance of the song "Fredward" in Stingray Sam.

Super User Friendly released Señor Gato on Sniff These Records in 2021. Kristen Eck of BumbleBee Radio called the record "a strange yet fascinating musical excursion that has hints of Zappa and The Flaming Lips." Jim Testa of Jersey Beat wrote, "It's impossible to sum up 15 tracks in one sentence, but let's start with 'weird modern lounge music' or maybe, 'Urge Overkill Meets Zappa,' with detours into instrumentals (Mariachi, Surf) and a few novelty tracks." The album includes guest performances by Rob Clores, cellist Catherine Bent, and multi-instrumentalist Mike McGinnis. A second version of Señor Gato, a book of Crugie's artwork with the music in an embedded digital audio player (called a "stereo boom book"), is "expected sometime in the near future."
