= Legs (Keep Dancing) =

2024 single by Vanessa Williams

Single by Vanessa Williams

from the album Survivor
- Released: April 26, 2024
- Recorded: 2023
- Genre: Dance-pop; nu-disco
- Length: 3:08
- Label: Mellian Music; WMG
- Songwriter(s): Chantry Johnson; Kjersti Long; Kipper Jones
- Producer(s): Chantry Johnson; Kipper Jones

Vanessa Williams singles chronology
"The Real Thing" (2009)	"Legs (Keep Dancing)" (2024)

Music video
- "Legs (Keep Dancing)" on YouTube

"Legs (Keep Dancing)" is a song by American singer and actress Vanessa Williams, released as the first single from her ninth studio album Survivor. It was released on April 26, 2024, and was her first studio recording in 15 years since The Real Thing. On May 13, 2024, "Legs (Keep Dancing)" debuted on the US Dance/Electronic Digital Song Sales chart at number 3. The single's success marks Williams's first hit on the Dance/Electronic Digital Song Sales chart.

== Overview ==
In April 2024, Vanessa Williams announced that she will release her new full-length studio album later in 2024. Williams launched her own record label, Mellian Music, for the release. She worked with songwriter Kipper Jones, who wrote her debut single "The Right Stuff", Chantry Johnson and Kjersti Long. The title was inspired by the book The Legs Are the Last to Go by Diahann Carroll. In an interview for Entertainment Tonight, Williams said: "Diahann played my mother in a movie I produced, The Courage to Love, and has always been a huge inspiration for me," she noted. "I remember seeing her talking to Oprah about her autobiography. She spoke so beautifully and confidently about her age and power and the fact that beauty fades but your legs give you strength and are the last to go."

== Music video ==
The accompanying video for "Legs (Keep Dancing)" directed by Mike Ruiz was released on YouTube on April 26, 2024. Williams has also released a sequence of Behind the Scenes mini-videos of the making of the 'Legs' music video.

== Charts ==
Chart performance for "Legs (Keep Dancing)"
Chart (2024)	Peak position
UK Singles Downloads Chart	76
UK Singles Sales Chart	85
US Dance/Electronic Digital Song Sales (Billboard)	3
