= The Real Thing =

The Real Thing or Real Thing may refer to:

== Film and television ==
- The Real Thing (film) or Livers Ain't Cheap, a 1996 American film
- The Real Thing, a 1980 television documentary by James Burke
- The Real Thing (TV series), Australian music television show (1977-78)
- "The Real Thing" (All Saints), a television episode
- "The Real Thing" (Lovejoy), a television episode

== Literature ==
- The Real Thing (play), a 1982 play by Tom Stoppard
- "The Real Thing" (story), an 1892 short story by Henry James
- The Real Thing, a 1980 collection of humorous essays by Kurt Andersen
- "The Real Thing", a 2006 short story by Alison Goodman

== Music ==
=== Performers ===
- The Real Thing (British band), a pop group
- The Real Thing (Norwegian band), a jazz quartet
- The Real Thing, an American jazz group fronted by Ray Santisi

=== Albums ===
- The Real Thing (Angela Winbush album), 1989
- The Real Thing (Bo Bice album) or the title song, 2005
- The Real Thing (Carol Sloane album), 1990
- The Real Thing (Dizzy Gillespie album), 1970
- The Real Thing (Eric Alexander album) or the title song, 2015
- The Real Thing (Faith No More album) or the title song, 1989
- The Real Thing (Houston Person album), 1973
- The Real Thing (Louis Hayes album), 1978
- The Real Thing (Midnight Oil album) or the title cover of the Russell Morris song (see below), 2000
- The Real Thing (PureNRG album) or the title song, 2009
- The Real Thing (Russell Morris album), 2002
- The Real Thing (Taj Mahal album), 1971
- The Real Thing (Vanessa Williams album) or the title song (see below), 2009
- The Real Thing: In Performance (1964–1981), a video album by Marvin Gaye, 2006
- The Real Thing: Words and Sounds Vol. 3, an album by Jill Scott, or the title song, 2007
- Real Thing (The Higgins album) or the title song, 2008

=== Songs ===
- "The Real Thing" (2 Unlimited song), 1994
- "The Real Thing" (ABC song), 1989
- "The Real Thing" (Gwen Stefani song), 2005
- "The Real Thing" (Highway song), 2016
- "The Real Thing" (Jellybean song), 1987
- "The Real Thing" (Lisa Stansfield song), 1997
- "The Real Thing" (Russell Morris song), 1969
- "The Real Thing" (Tony Di Bart song), 1993
- "The Real Thing" (Vanessa Williams song), 2009
- "Real Thing" (Ruel song), 2019
- "The Real Thing", written by Ashford & Simpson with Jo Armstead; recorded by Betty Everett (1965) and Tina Britt (1965)
- "The Real Thing", by the Brothers Johnson from Winners, 1981
- "The Real Thing", by Christina Aguilera (as Jade St. John) from the TV series Nashville, 2015
- "The Real Thing", by Client Liaison, 2019
- "The Real Thing", by FEMM from Femm-Isation, 2014
- "The Real Thing", by the Human League from Crash, 1986
- "The Real Thing", by Kenny Loggins from Leap of Faith, 1991
- "The Real Thing", by Kingston Wall from III – Tri-Logy, 1994
- "The Real Thing", by Lords of Acid from Strange Days (Music from the Motion Picture), 1995
- "The Real Thing", by Phoenix from Bankrupt!, 2013
- "The Real Thing", by Warren Haynes from Live at Bonnaroo, 2004
- "Real Thing", by Alice in Chains from Facelift, 1990
- "Real Thing", by Boys Like Girls from Love Drunk, 2009
- "Real Thing", by KMFDM from Hau Ruck, 2005
- "Real Thing", by Lights from Pep, 2022
- "Real Thing", by Pearl Jam and Cypress Hill from the Judgement Night film soundtrack, 1993
- "Real Thing", by Stars from There Is No Love in Fluorescent Light, 2017
- "Real Thing", by Sugababes from One Touch, 2000
- "Real Thing", by Tory Lanez from Memories Don't Die, 2018
- "Real Thing", by Zac Brown Band from Welcome Home, 2017

== Other uses ==
- The Real Thing (podcast), an Australian podcast (2016–2018)

== See also ==
- "Ain't Nothing Like the Real Thing", a song by Marvin Gaye and Tammi Terrell
- "Even Better Than the Real Thing", a song by U2
- "It's the Real Thing", a song by Angela Winbush
- "It's the Real Thing", a Coca-Cola slogan
- Molly: The Real Thing, a film about music critic and entrepreneur Molly Meldrum
- Real Things (disambiguation)
