= Annie Golden =

American actress and singer (born 1951)

- Born: October 19, 1951 (age 74); New York City, U.S.
- Occupations: Actress; singer
- Years active: 1975–present
- Known for: Orange Is the New Black

Annie Golden (born October 19, 1951) is an American actress and singer. She first came to prominence as the lead singer of the punk band the Shirts from 1975 to 1981 with whom she recorded three albums. She began her acting career as Mother in the 1977 Broadway revival of Hair; later taking on the role of Jeannie Ryan in the 1979 film version of the musical. Other notable film credits include Desperately Seeking Susan (1985), Baby Boom (1987), Longtime Companion (1989), Strictly Business (1991), Prelude to a Kiss (1992), 12 Monkeys (1995), The American Astronaut (2001), It Runs in the Family (2003), Adventures of Power (2008), and I Love You Phillip Morris (2009).

Golden is best known for portraying mute Norma Romano in the Netflix comedy-drama streaming television series Orange Is the New Black from 2013 to 2019. In 1985–1986 she appeared as the recurring character Tommy in Miami Vice, and from 1989 to 1992 she portrayed the recurring role of Margaret O'Keefe on the sitcom Cheers. She has appeared as a guest star on several television programs, including American Playhouse, Dear John, Father Dowling Mysteries, High Maintenance, Law & Order, and True Blue among others.

She starred as Cinderella's Mother, Granny, and the Giant's Wife in the 2022 Broadway revival of Stephen Sondheim's Into the Woods .

== Early life ==
Golden was born in Brooklyn, New York City, New York. She sang in school and church choirs as a child. Her father, a Teamster, died at age 52 and her mother died in 1974, at the age of 42. Golden on her family: "My mom never saw me do anything." She said that she "had no training." When she met Art LaMonica in 1971, he invited her to join his group called Lackeys & Schemers.

== Career ==
=== Music ===
Golden began her career as the lead singer of the Shirts. The band headlined CBGB in the late 1970s and recorded three albums for Capitol Records, The Shirts (1978), Street Light Shine (1979) and Inner Sleeve (1980). During the early 1990s she performed as part of the duo Golden Carillo with Frank Carillo. They released three albums, Fire in Newtown (1992), Toxic Emotion (1994), and Back for More (1997). She returned to the Shirts, but she has also performed solo and with a band. In 1984, her song "Hang Up the Phone" was featured on the soundtrack of the film Sixteen Candles. She performs a revue of songs from her stage career along with originals called Annie Golden's Velvet Prison. Golden appeared at Phish's New Year Eve concert on December 31, 2023, where she portrayed the grandmother of the character Jimmy from the song "Harpua" during a performance of their Gamehendge song cycle.

=== Film and TV ===
While with the Shirts, Golden was discovered by Miloš Forman, who gave her a part in Hair. She had featured roles on the television series Cheers and Miami Vice. Golden was the voice of Marina in the Don Bluth animated feature film The Pebble and the Penguin. She played a taxi driver in Terry Gilliam's 12 Monkeys (1995), wherein she had a scene with Bruce Willis and Madeline Stowe.

In recent years, she has been seen in commercials for Coinstar, in which she portrays the Tooth Fairy. She appears in the musical film Temptation with actor Adam Pascal, Tony Award winners Alice Ripley and Anika Noni Rose, and film actress Zoe Saldaña and in 2009 had a small role in I Love You Phillip Morris with actors Ewan McGregor and Jim Carrey, playing a simple woman requiring legal assistance.

In 2013, she began playing the role of the nearly mute Norma Romano in the Netflix comedy-drama series Orange Is the New Black, for which she won a 2015 Screen Actors Guild Award (along with the rest of the ensemble cast).

=== Stage ===
On Broadway, she has appeared in the 1977 revival of Hair, Leader of the Pack (1985), Ah, Wilderness! (1988), On the Town (1998), and The Full Monty (2000). She had the title role in the workshop of the short-lived adaptation of Stephen King's novel Carrie. She also played the role of Lynette "Squeaky" Fromme in Stephen Sondheim and John Weidman's musical Assassins during its world premiere at Playwrights Horizons in New York City in 1990–1991, and is featured on the cast recording of it, on the RCA label. In 2003 she joined other original off-Broadway cast members in a Reprise! (Los Angeles) concert production of Assassins. In 2007, she was stand-by for the two comic villain roles in the musical Xanadu on Broadway.

She played Lucy Schmeeler, the whiny friend with the chronic cold, in the off-Broadway Public Theater production at the Delacorte Theater of On the Town in August 1997. She also appeared in the lab production of the musical Hit the Lights! in 1993 at the Vineyard Theatre.

Golden has appeared in three separate versions of Hair: a Broadway revival in 1977, the motion picture in 1979 and a special benefit performance concert in 2004. Golden starred with Peter Scolari in the world premiere of The Nutcracker and I from November 29 to December 31, 2011, at the George Street Playhouse, New Brunswick, New Jersey. Comically playing the Sugar Rush Fairy (and three other roles) in this musical comedy featuring the music of Tchaikovsky and lyrics by Gerard Alessandrini, she and Scolari were compared in one review to the team of Imogene Coca and Sid Caesar.

Golden appeared in the musical Violet starring Sutton Foster on Broadway in 2014.

From May 4–15, 2022, Golden appeared as Cinderella's Mother/Granny/Giant's Wife in the Encores! production of Into the Woods at the New York City Center. The production transferred to the St. James Theatre on Broadway, opening on June 28, 2022. Golden stayed with the production until its closing on January 8, 2023.

Since 2005, Golden has frequently appeared in stage concerts for composer Joe Iconis. She starred in the Barrington Stage Company production of his Broadway Bounty Hunter, with the book by Iconis, Lance Rubin and Jason "Sweettooth" Williams, directed by Julianne Boyd, which opened on August 13, 2016. This role was written by Iconis for Golden; he said of Golden: "She's essentially playing a fictionalized version of herself, so she's been so helpful... Her personality has imbued the whole spirit of the show." The Variety reviewer wrote: "Golden does woebegone really well....Surprisingly, however, the show underserves its star... except for a rousing, climactic paean to “the blood... back in my veins,” the material isn't there... There's only limited chance to see her take full command of stage and story." The Boston Globe called the musical "rowdy, funny, cheerfully cockeyed." A concert version of Broadway Bounty Hunter, starring Golden, was presented at Joe's Pub in New York City on September 26, 2016. She starred in Broadway Bounty Hunter at the off-Broadway Greenwich House Theater in July 2019.

== Acting credits ==
=== Filmography ===
Year	Title	Role	Director	Notes
1979	Hair	Jeannie Ryan	Miloš Forman	
1985	Desperately Seeking Susan	Band Singer	Susan Seidelman	
1985	Key Exchange	Val	Barnet Kellman	
1985	Streetwalkin'	Phoebe	Joan Freeman	
1985	Hometown		Kim Friedman	TV series (1 episode)
1985–86	Miami Vice	Prostitute at police station (Episode The Prodigal Son). Tommy	Paul Michael Glaser, Craig Bolotin & John Nicolella	TV series (3 episodes)
1986	Class of '86		Jerry Adler	
1986	American Playhouse	Caroline	Luis Soto	TV series (1 episode)
1986	Down to Earth	Starr Gardner	Russ Petranto	TV series (1 episode)
1987	Forever, Lulu	Diana	Amos Kollek	
1987	Love at Stake	Abigail Baxter	John Moffitt	
1987	Baby Boom	Nanny	Charles Shyer	
1989	Longtime Companion	Heroin Addict	Norman René	
1989	Dear John	Sylvia	John Rich	TV series (1 episode)
1989	True Blue	Connie Tollin	William A. Graham & George Mendeluk	TV series (2 episodes)
1989–92	Cheers	Margaret O'Keefe	James Burrows	TV series (4 episodes)
1990	Father Dowling Mysteries	Florence Galthworthy	Ron Satlof	TV series (1 episode)
1991	Strictly Business	Sheila	Kevin Hooks	
1992	This Is My Life	Marianne	Nora Ephron	
1992	Prelude to a Kiss	Tin Market Musician	Norman René (2)	
1995	The Pebble and the Penguin	Marina	Don Bluth & Gary Goldman	Lead role
1995	12 Monkeys	Woman Cabbie	Terry Gilliam	
1996	One Way Out	Eve	Kevin Lynn	
1997	Arresting Gena	Sally	Hannah Weyer	
1997	My Divorce	The middle sister	Andrea Clark	
1998	Barriers	Phil	Alan Baxter	
1999	Law & Order	Frances Padden	Constantine Makris	TV series (1 episode)
1999	Third Watch	Amber Gastin	Christopher Chulack	TV series (1 episode)
2001	The American Astronaut	Cloris	Cory McAbee	
2001	Mourning Glory	Mediator	Barrett Esposito	
2001	Third Watch	Crazy Woman	Jesús Salvador Treviño	TV series (1 Episode)
2002	Delayed	Sarah	Charles Ricciardi	
2003	It Runs in the Family	Deb	Fred Schepisi	
2003	Trouble in Paradise	Dolores	Dave Coleman	Short
2004	Messengers	Alice Farmer	Philip Farha	
2004	Temptation	Nora	Mark Tarlov	
2005	Tom and Francie	Francie	Patrick Michael Denny	
2005	Live at Five	Annie	Averie Storck	Short
2006	Law & Order: Special Victims Unit	Varla	Arthur W. Forney	TV series (1 episode)
2007	Brooklyn Rules	Dottie	Michael Corrente	
2007	Sexina: Popstar P.I.	Vera's Mom	Erik Sharkey	
2008	Adventures of Power	Farrah	Ari Gold	
2009	I Love You Phillip Morris	Eudora Mixon	Glenn Ficarra & John Requa	
2009–10	Wiener & Wiener	Deena	Dante Russo	TV series (4 episodes)
2012	The Trouble with Cali	Mrs. Katie Saperstein	Paul Sorvino	
2012	NYC 22	Unmarried Woman	Martha Mitchell	TV series (1 episode)
2013–19	Orange Is the New Black	Norma Romano	Several	TV series (32 episodes); Screen Actors Guild Award for Outstanding Performance by an Ensemble in a Comedy Series
2015	American Songbook at NJPAC		David Stern	TV series
2016	Miles	Rhonda Roth	Nathan Adloff	
2017	Difficult People	Flipper	Jeffrey Walker	TV series
2018	One Dollar		Craig Zobel	TV series
2019	High Maintenance	Barbie	Katja Blichfeld	TV series (1 episode)
2020	Run	Marjorie	Kate Dennis	TV series (1 episode)
2022	New Amsterdam	Kate Carnegie	Michael Slovis	TV series (1 episode)
2022	Evil	Traci	Peter Sollett	TV series (1 episode)
2023	The Marvelous Mrs. Maisel	Marge	Daniel Palladino, Amy Sherman-Palladino & Scott Ellis	TV series (3 episodes)
2023	Best Medicine	Millicent Cloofe	Todd Holland	TV series (1 episode)

=== Theatre ===
Year	Title	Role	Notes
1977	Hair	Mom	
1982–87	Little Shop of Horrors	Audrey	
1985	Leader of the Pack	Angie	
1988	Ah, Wilderness!	Belle	
1990–91	Assassins	Lynette "Squeaky" Fromme	
1995	The Sugar Bean Sisters	Videlia Sparks	
1997	On the Town	Lucy Schmeeler	
1998–99	On the Town	Lucy Schmeeler	
2000	An Empty Plate in the Café du Grand Boeuf	Mimi	
2000–02	The Full Monty	Georgie	
2004	Mimi le Duck	Miriam	
2004	Hair		
2005	Rag and Bone	Hooker	
2005	Cinderella	Fairy Godmother	
2006	Mimi le Duck	Miriam	
2007-08	Xanadu	Calliope, Melpomene (u/s)	
2009	Citizen Ruth	Jesse Dove	
2009	Xanadu	Aphrodite/Calliope	
2010	The Bikinis	Annie	
2011	The Shaggs: Philosophy of the World	Annie Wiggin	
2011	Xanadu	Aphrodite/Calliope	
2011	The Common Swallow	Corinthia	
2011	The Nutcracker and I	Sugar Rush Fairy/Mother	
2012	Disaster, A 1970's disaster movie… musical	Shirley	
2012	We Play For The Gods	Maria	
2013	Good Person of Szechwan	1st God	
2013	Marry Harry	Debby	
2014	Violet	Old Lady 1/Hotel Hooker	
2016	Sweeney Todd: The Demon Barber of Fleet Street	Mrs. Lovett	
2019	Damn Yankees	Doris	
2022–23	Into the Woods	Cinderella's Mother/Granny/Giant's Wife	Encores!
2022–23	Into the Woods	Cinderella's Mother/Granny/Giant's Wife	Broadway
