= Stephen Root filmography =

Root in 2026

Stephen Root (born 1951) is an American film and television actor. He is for his extensive work in film and television, he gained attention for his roles as Jimmy James on the NBC sitcom NewsRadio (1995–1999), as Milton Waddams in the comedy film Office Space (1999), and voiced Bill Dauterive and Buck Strickland on the animated series King of the Hill (1997–2010, 2025–present).

He has received two Primetime Emmy Award nominations for Outstanding Supporting Actor in a Comedy Series, in 2019 for his role as Monroe Fuches in the HBO dark comedy crime series Barry (2018–2023) and in 2026 for his role as fisherman and outspoken superstitious Wyck Crawford in the Apple TV comedy horror series Widow's Bay (2026–present), which he won.

== Acting credits ==
=== Film ===
Year	Title	Role	Notes	Ref.
1988	Crocodile Dundee II	DEA Agent		
1988	Monkey Shines	Dean Burbage		
1989	Black Rain	IA Detective Berg		
1990	Stanley & Iris	Mr. Hershey		
1990	Ghost	Police Sergeant		
1991	Guilty by Suspicion	RKO Guard		
1991	V.I. Warshawski	Mickey		
1991	Bed & Breakfast	Randolph		
1992	Buffy the Vampire Slayer	Gary Murray		
1993	Dave	Don Durenberger		
1993	RoboCop 3	Coontz		
1993	Extreme Justice	Max Alvarez		
1995	Bye Bye Love	Awakened Neighbor	Uncredited	
1995	Night of the Scarecrow	Sheriff Frank Goodman		
1998	Krippendorf's Tribe	Gerald Adams		
1999	Office Space	Milton Waddams		
1999	Natural Selection	Mr. Crenshaw	a.k.a. The Monster Hunter	
1999	Bicentennial Man	Dennis Mansky		
1999	Gut Feeling	Kane Cohen		
2000	O Brother, Where Art Thou?	Mr. Lund		
2002	Ice Age	Frank, Start (voice)		
2002	The Country Bears	Zeb Zoober (voice)		
2002	White Oleander	Michael	Scenes deleted	
2003	Finding Nemo	Bubbles (voice)		
2003	Grind	Cameron		
2004	Raising Genius	Dwight Nestor		
2004	The Ladykillers	Fernand Gudge		
2004	Jersey Girl	Greenie		
2004	Dodgeball: A True Underdog Story	Gordon Pibb		
2004	Surviving Christmas	Dr. Freeman		
2004	Wake Up, Ron Burgundy: The Lost Movie	Vince Masters		
2005	Just Friends	KC		
2006	Ice Age: The Meltdown	Aardvark Dad (voice)		
2006	Gretchen	Herb		
2006	Idiocracy	Judge Hector "The Hangman" BMW		
2006	The Frank Anderson	John Simon		
2006	The Fox and the Hound 2	Talent Scout (voice)	Direct-to-video	
2007	Cook Off!	Morty Van Rookle		
2007	No Country for Old Men	Man Who Hires Wells		
2007	Have Dreams, Will Travel	Sheriff Brock		
2007	Sunny & Share Love You	Clive Anderson		
2008	Mad Money	Glover		
2008	Over Her Dead Body	Sculptor		
2008	Drillbit Taylor	Principal Doppler		
2008	Leatherheads	Suds		
2008	Tripping the Rift: The Movie	Chode (voice)		
2009	Glock	Remington	Short film	
2009	Bob Funk	Steve		
2009	The Soloist	Curt Reynolds		
2009	Dr. Dolittle: Million Dollar Mutts	Turtle (voice)	Direct-to-video	
2009	Imagine That	Fred Franklin		
2009	The Men Who Stare at Goats	Gus Lacey		
2010	Son of Mourning	Senator Lewis		
2010	Unthinkable	Charlie Thomson		
2010	The Conspirator	John M. Lloyd		
2010	Everything Must Go	Elliot		
2010	Scooby-Doo! Camp Scare	Burt (voice)	Direct-to-video	
2011	Cedar Rapids	Bill Korgstad		
2011	Rango	Doc, Merrimack, Mr. Snuggles (voice)		
2011	Red State	Sheriff Wynan		
2011	J. Edgar	Arthur Koehler		
2011	Tom and Jerry and the Wizard of Oz	Uncle Henry Gale, Crows (voice)	Direct-to-video	
2011	Batman: Year One	Lt. Branden (voice)	Direct-to-video	
2012	Big Miracle	Gov. Haskell		
2012	The Company You Keep	Billy Cusimano		
2013	Sweetwater	Hugh		
2013	I Know That Voice	Himself	Documentary	
2013	Bad Milo!	Roger		
2013	Superman: Unbound	Zor-El (voice)		
2013	The Lone Ranger	Habberman		
2014	Selma	Al Lingo		
2014	Lennon or McCartney	Himself	Short film	
2015	Hello, My Name Is Doris	Todd Miller		
2015	7 Chinese Brothers	George		
2015	Trumbo	Hymie King		
2016	Tom and Jerry: Back to Oz	Uncle Henry Gale (voice)		
2016	Finding Dory	Bubbles (voice)		
2016	Miles	Ron Walton		
2016	Mike and Dave Need Wedding Dates	Burt Stangle		
2016	Looking for the Jackalope	Jackalope (voice)		
2016	Spectral	Dr. Mindala		
2017	Get Out	Jim Hudson		
2017	Infinity Baby	Fenton		
2017	Three Christs	Dr. Bill Rogers		
2018	Life of the Party	Michael "Mike" Cook		
2018	The Ballad of Buster Scruggs	Teller	Segment: "Near Algodones"	
2018	On the Basis of Sex	Professor Ernest Brown		
2019	Seberg	Walt Breckman		
2019	Bombshell	Neil Mullen		
2020	Four Good Days	Chris Wheeler		
2020	Uncle Frank	Daddy Mac		
2020	The Empty Man	Arthur Parsons		
2020	Home	Father Browning		
2021	Happily	Mr. Goodman		
2021	Queenpins	Agent Flanagan		
2021	The Tragedy of Macbeth	The Porter		
2022	To Leslie	Dutch		
2022	Beavis and Butt-Head Do the Universe	Jail Tattoo Artist (voice)		
2023	Paint	Tony		
2023	Lousy Carter	Analyst		
2025	Dog Man	Grampa (voice)		
2025	Heads of State	Arthur Hammond		
2025	Playdate	Gordon		
2026	The Wrecking Crew	Detective Sergeant Karl Rennert		
2026	Mike & Nick & Nick & Alice	Chet		
2026	The Long Haul	CJ's friend		
2027	Slayground †	TBA	Post-production	

=== Television ===
Year	Title	Role	Notes
1989	Cross of Fire	Beggs	Television film
1990	Wiseguy	Bishop	Episode: "Dead Right"
1990	Roseanne	Peter Lundy	Episode: "Fender Bender"
1990	The Young Riders	Luke	Episode: "Bad Company"
1990	Head of the Class	Mr. Birch	Episode: "My Son the Primate"
1990–1991	Jake and the Fatman	Sgt. Moynihan, Hastings	2 episodes
1990–1992	Night Court	Mr. Willard, Spirit of Death	2 episodes
1990–1994	L.A. Law	Atty. Brandon McCafferty	4 episodes
1991	Davis Rules	Porter	Episode: "Soap"
1991	Golden Years	Major Moreland	6 episodes
1991	My Life and Times	Ross	Episode: "Our Wedding"
1991	Home Improvement	Exterminator	Episode: "Wild Kingdom"
1991	Sons and Daughters	Stevey	Episode: "Melanie"
1991	The Torkelsons	Sheriff Bobby Clinton	Episode: "I Fought the Law"
1991	Star Trek: The Next Generation	Captain K'Vada	2 episodes
1992	A Woman Scorned: The Betty Broderick Story	Kevin McDonald	Television film
1992	Eerie, Indiana	Mr. Chaney	Episode: "Mr. Chaney"
1992	Her Final Fury: Betty Broderick, the Last Chapter	Kevin McDonald	Television film
1992	Murphy Brown	John Brophy	Episode: "Till Death or Next Thursday Do We Part"
1992	Civil Wars	Mrs. Caldecott's Lawyer	2 episodes
1993	Northern Exposure	Brother Timothy	Episode: "Revelations"
1993	The Golden Palace	Mr. Tucker	Episode: "You've Lost That Livin' Feeling"
1993	Quantum Leap	John Tremaine Jr.	Episode: "Goodbye Norma Jean - April 4, 1960"
1993	Class of '61	Edwin Stanton	Television film
1993	The Blanche Taylor Moore Story	Dr. Kirby	Television film
1993	Sirens	George Bailey	Episode: "Looks Like Christmas"
1993	Blossom	Louie	4 episodes
1993	In the Heat of the Night	Raymond Mercer	Episode: "A Love Lost"
1993–1994	Harts of the West	R.O. Moon	15 episodes
1994	NYPD Blue	IAB Sgt. Fulmer	Episode: "Guns 'n Rosaries"
1994	Party of Five	Football Coach	Episode: "Good Sports"
1994	Sweet Justice	Bowles	2 episodes
1994	Diagnosis: Murder	Charlie Lane	Episode: "The Last Laugh: Part 2"
1995	Chicago Hope	Trumpet Playing Mental Patient	Episode: "Love and Hope"
1995	Cybill	Phil Asher	Episode: "Starting on the Wrong Foot"
1995	Christy	Clarence Sweetwater	Episode: "To Have and to Hold"
1995	VR.5	F.A.A. Negotiator	Episode: "Control Freak"
1995	In the Line of Duty: Hunt for Justice	Jaan Laaman	Television film
1995–1999	NewsRadio	Jimmy James	Main role; 97 episodes
1996	Seinfeld	Mr. Lager	Episode: "The Invitations"
1996	The Lottery	Graham Dunbar	Television film
1996	Pandora's Clock	Mark Hastings	2 episodes
1996	The Road to Galveston	Ed Kirkman	Television film
1997	Johnny Bravo	Timmy's Dad, Announcer (voice)	Episode: "Johnny Real Good"
1997–2010, 2025–present	King of the Hill	Bill Dauterive / Buck Strickland; Carl Moss (2026–present)	Main role
1998	From the Earth to the Moon	Chris Kraft	Main role; 5 episodes
1998	Profiler	Houston Plant Manager	2 episodes
1999	Superman: The Animated Series	Revered Amos Howell/Unity (voice)	Episode: "Unity"
1999	The Sissy Duckling	Big Ducky (voice)	Television film
1999	Big Guy and Rusty the Boy Robot	Dr. Donovan (voice)	26 episodes
1999–2001	Ladies Man	Gene	Main role; 30 episodes
2000	Buzz Lightyear of Star Command	Sheriff (voice)	3 episodes
2001	The Andy Dick Show	Manager of 98+1 Store	Episode: "Andy Land"
2001	The Norm Show	Mr. Sweeney	2 episodes
2001	DAG	Senator Culpepper	Episode: "Smoke"
2001	The Legend of Tarzan	Theodore Roosevelt (voice)	Episode: "Tarzan and the Rough Rider"
2001	Ed	George MacPherson	Episode: "Changes"
2002	Dexter Prep	Charles	Television film
2002	The Proud Family	Mr. Andrews (voice)	Episode: "I Had a Dream"
2002	Malcolm in the Middle	John Pratt	2 episodes
2002	Just Shoot Me!	Dr. Drake Kelson	Episode: "Blush Gets Some Therapy"
2002	Justice League	T. Blake / Cat Man (voice)	Episode: "Legends"
2002	Teamo Supremo	Various roles (Note: The Angler, Billy Jim Dixon, Fishmonger No. 1 (voice))	Episode: "Angler's Angle"
2002	According to Jim	Al Crannis	Episode: "The Christmas Party"
2002–2004	Grounded for Life	Tony Bustamante	3 episodes
2002–2005	Kim Possible	Various voices (Note: Pop-Pop Porter, Chester Yapsby, Memphis, Additional voices)	6 episodes
2003	CSI: Crime Scene Investigation	Michael Kirkwood	Episode: "Homebodies"
2004	Frasier	Harbin	Episode: "Detour"
2004	Brandy & Mr. Whiskers	Santa Claus (voice)	Episode: "On Whiskers, on Lola, on Cheryl, on Meryl"
2004–2007	Tripping the Rift	Chode (voice)	Main role; 39 episodes
2005	Teen Titans	Val–Yor (voice)	Episode: "Troq"
2005	Kim Possible: So the Drama	Cowboy Gambler (voice)	Television film
2005–2007	The X's	Homebase (voice)	9 episodes
2005–2007	The West Wing	Bob Mayer	9 episodes
2005–2007	American Dad!	Dick, Dentist's Father (voice)	7 episodes
2006	The Path to 9/11	Richard Clarke	2 episodes
2007	Random! Cartoons	Lance (voice)	Episode: "Squirly Town"
2008	Head Case	Pat Jennings	Episode: "Come Together"
2008	WordGirl	Professor Robert Tubing (voice)	Episode: "A Game of Cat & Mouse"
2008	Boston Legal	Ethan Melman	Episode: "Tabloid Nation"
2008	Chowder	Stilton, Dancer (voice)	Episode: "The Apprentice Games"
2008	The Sarah Silverman Program	Johnny Forrealz	Episode: "Kangamangus"
2008	Pushing Daisies	Dwight Dixon	5 episodes
2008–2009	True Blood	Eddie	4 episodes
2009	Californication	Ricardo Collini	Episode: "Slow Happy Boys"
2009	Slacker Cats	Tommy (voice)	Episode: "Buckley on the Run"
2010	24	Bill Prady	3 episodes
2010	The Defenders	Judge Taylor	Episode: "Pilot"
2010	Louie	Dr. Heppa	Episode: "Dentist/Tarese"
2010	Glenn Martin, DDS	Hoss Willicker (voice)	2 episodes
2010–2011	Batman: The Brave and the Bold	Various roles (Note: Woozy Winks, Oswald Cobblepot/Penguin, Killer Croc, Carnival Barker (voice))	Voices; 4 episodes
2010–2014	Justified	Judge Mike Reardon	Recurring role
2011	Childrens Hospital	Hank Maestro	Episode: "Party Down"
2011	The Life & Times of Tim	Lou (voice)	Episode: "The Caddy's Shack/The Sausage Salesman"
2011	Fringe	Raymond	Episode: "And Those We've Left Behind"
2011	Thundercats	Drifter (voice)	Episode: "The Duelist and the Drifter"
2011	Raising Hope	Cap Collins	Episode: "Sabrina Has Money"
2011–2016	Kung Fu Panda: Legends of Awesomeness	Master Junjie (voice)	5 episodes
2011–2017	Adventure Time	Various roles (Note: Royal Tart Toter, Grimby, Martin Mertens (voice))	9 episodes
2011, 2017	Kevin Pollak's Chat Show	Himself/Guest	Episodes: "95", "297"
2012	The Legend of Korra	Various roles (Note: Hobo, White Lotus Leader, Phonograph Vendor (voice))	2 episodes
2012	The Good Wife	Judge Murphy Wicks	2 episodes
2012	Outlaw Country	Frank	Television film
2012, 2022	Young Justice	Jack Haly (voice)	2 episodes
2012–2013	Boardwalk Empire	Gaston Means	9 episodes
2012–2013	The Cleveland Show	Neighbors Kellogg, Allister Monkarsh (voice)	2 episodes
2012–2014	Dragons: Riders of Berk	Mildew (voice)	17 episodes
2012–2016	Gravity Falls	Bud Gleeful (voice)	8 episodes
2013	Out There	Mr. Shooty (voice)	Episode: "Frosty King"
2013	The Newsroom	General Stanislao Stomtonovich	2 episodes
2013	The Arrangement	Avery Boomer	Television film
2013	Bee and PuppyCat	Farmer (voice)	Episode: "Farmer"
2014	Fargo	Burt Canton	2 episodes (Year One)
2014	The Big Bang Theory	Dan	2 episodes
2014	Mike Tyson Mysteries	Thomas J. Watson (voice)	Episode: "Ultimate Judgment Day"
2014	Hot in Cleveland	Brian	Episode: "The Bachelors"
2014–2015	Turn: Washington's Spies	Nathaniel Sackett	4 episodes
2014–2015	Brooklyn Nine-Nine	Lynn Boyle	4 episodes
2014–2015	Phineas and Ferb	Floyd (voice)	2 episodes
2014–2017	Idiotsitter	Kent Russell	Main role; 13 episodes
2015–2016	Star vs. the Forces of Evil	Brian (voice)	2 episodes
2016	Workaholics	Carty	Episode: "Gone Catfishing"
2016	All the Way	J. Edgar Hoover	Television film
2016	Masters of Sex	Harvey Toplin	Episode: "Topeka"
2016	Con Man	Pascal	Episode: "New Deal, No Deal"
2016	Guardians of the Galaxy	Neeza (voice)	Episode: "Jingle Bell Rock"
2016–2019	The Man in the High Castle	Hawthorne Abendsen	10 episodes
2017	Angie Tribeca	Mortimer Begoyle	Episode: "License to Drill"
2017	Veep	Judge Walsh	Episode: "Judge"
2017	Niko and the Sword of Light	Diggantus, Exuber-Ant (voice)	Episode: "From the Tunnels of Terror to the Den of Doom"
2018	Mr. Pickles	Mr. Montgomery (voice)	Episode: "Telemarketers Are the Devil"
2018	Dallas & Robo	Uncle Danny (voice)	8 episodes
2018	The Epic Tales of Captain Underpants	Mr. Morty Fyde (voice)	Episode: "The Squishy Predicament of Stanley Peet's Stinky Pits"
2018–2023	Barry	Monroe Fuches / The Raven	Main role
2019	BoJack Horseman	Jeremiah Whitewhale (voice)	Episode: "Feel-Good Story"
2019	Bless the Harts	Rick Ocean (voice)	Episode: "Pig Trouble in Little Greenpoint"
2019–2021	Summer Camp Island	Stuart, Additional voices	5 episodes
2019–2022	Amphibia	Frodrick Toadstool (voice)	22 episodes
2020	Harvey Girls Forever!	Fatso (voice)	Episode: "Harvey Endings"
2020	DuckTales	Junior Woodchuck Guidebook (voice)	Episode: "Challenge of the Senior Junior Woodchucks!"
2020	The Midnight Gospel	Various voices	3 episodes
2020	Adventure Time: Distant Lands	Mr. M (voice)	Episode: "BMO"
2020	Perry Mason	Maynard Barnes	7 episodes
2020–2022	The Mighty Ones	Bernard (voice)	4 episodes
2020–2022	Robot Chicken	Additional voices	4 episodes
2021	The Simpsons	Bildorf (voice)	Episode: "Wad Goals"
2021	Blindspotting	Rick	Episode: "Bride or Die"
2021–2022	Blade Runner: Black Lotus	Earl Grant (voice)	English dub 11 episodes
2021–2023	Succession	Ron Petkus	2 episodes
2021–2024	Masters of the Universe	Cringer / Battle Cat, Snout Spout (voice)	Main role; 13 episodes
2022	The Legend of Vox Machina	Professor Anders (voice)	4 episodes
2022	The Book of Boba Fett	Lortha Peel	Episode: "Chapter 3: The Streets of Mos Espa"
2022	We Baby Bears	Various voices	Episode: "Unica"
2022	Solar Opposites	Train Store Owner (voice)	Episode: "Edamame Duffle Bag"
2022	Bee and PuppyCat: Lazy in Space	Warlock G, Various (voice)	3 episodes
2023	Velma	Chief Cogburn (voice)	4 episodes
2023	Hamster & Gretel	Jeff Strawberry, Melvin Horsegobble (voice)	2 episodes
2023	Bedrock	Fred Flintstone (voice)	Pilot
2023	Beavis and Butt-Head	Gary (voice)	Episode: "Meditation Sucks/Polling Place"
2023	Fired on Mars	Mark (voice)	3 episodes
2023	Clone High	Mr Big Corporation (voice)	Episode: "Saved by the Knoll"
2023	Invincible	Dr. Elias Brandyworth (voice)	Episode: "Atom Eve"
2023	Scott Pilgrim Takes Off	Nanomachines (voice)	Episode: "The World vs. Scott Pilgrim"
2023	Praise Petey	Mr. St. Barts (voice)	Main role; 10 episodes
2023	Adventure Time: Fionna and Cake	Martin Mertens (voice)	Episode: "The Star"
2023	Beacon 23	Solomon	4 episodes
2024	Star Trek: Lower Decks	Lieutenant Gene Jakobowski (voice)	Episode: "Starbase 80?!"
2024–2025	Krapopolis	Salt (voice)	2 episodes
2024–2025	It's Florida, Man	Florida Man (voice)	12 episodes
2025	StuGo	Dr. Rostrum (voice)	Episode: "S.T.U.G.O."
2025	Bob's Burgers	Jackson Woodall (voice)	Episode: "Mr. Fischoeder's Opus"
2025	Resident Alien	Ed Vanderspeigle	Episode: "Daddy Issues"
2025–2026	Family Guy	Professor O'Callaghan / Priest (voice)	2 episodes
2025–2026	Rick and Morty	Ronkonkomus Joe / Carl (voice)	2 episodes
2026	Strip Law	Glem Blorchman (voice)	Main role; 10 episodes
2026	The Terror: Devil in Silver	Dr. Laurence Badger	Main role; 4 episodes
2026	Regular Show: The Lost Tapes	Jampft Grimpfton (voice)	Episode: "Fix That Tape"
2026–present	Widow's Bay	Wyck Crawford	Main role; 10 episodes

=== Theatre ===
Year	Title	Role	Playwright	Venue	Notes	Ref.
1980	Journey's End	2nd Lieutenant Trotter	R.C. Sheriff		Off-Broadway	
1986	So Long on Lonely Street	King Vaughnum III	Sandra Deer	Jack Lawrence Theatre	Broadway	
1987	All My Sons	Frank Lubey	Arthur Miller	John Golden Theater	Broadway	
2010	Much Ado About Nothing	Don John	William Shakespeare	Kirk Douglas Theatre	California	
2015	Marjorie Prime	Jon	Jordan Harrison	Playwrights Horizons	Off-Broadway	

=== Video games ===
Year	Title	Role	Notes
1997	Blade Runner	Early Q	
2000	Deus Ex	Mechanic	Uncredited
2000	King of the Hill	Bill Dauterive	
2003	Finding Nemo	Bubbles	
2003	Finding Nemo: Nemo's Underwater World of Fun	Bubbles	
2026	Grand Theft Auto VI	Brian Heder	

=== Theme parks ===
Year	Title	Role	Notes
2007	Finding Nemo Submarine Voyage	Bubbles	Short film
