= The American Astronaut =

2001 American musical film

- Theatrical release poster
- Directed by: Cory McAbee
- Written by: Cory McAbee
- Produced by: Bobby Lurie; William "Pinetop" Perkins; Joshua Taylor
- Starring: Cory McAbee; Rocco Sisto; Greg Russell Cook; Annie Golden
- Cinematography: W. Mott Hupfel III
- Edited by: Pete Beaudreau
- Music by: The Billy Nayer Show
- Production companies: BNS Productions; Commodore Films
- Distributed by: Artistic License Films
- Release date: October 12, 2001
- Running time: 91 minutes
- Country: United States
- Language: English

The American Astronaut is a 2001 American independent space Western musical comedy film directed by and starring Cory McAbee. The film is set in a fictitious past, in which space travel is pioneered by roughnecks. The film was released on DVD in the spring of 2005. The band Billy Nayer Show, helmed by McAbee, wrote and performed the film's soundtrack.

== Plot ==
Space travel has become a dirty way of life dominated by derelicts, grease monkeys, thieves, and hard-boiled interplanetary traders such as Samuel Curtis (Cory McAbee), an astronaut from Earth who deals in rare goods, living or otherwise.

His mission begins with the unlikely delivery of a cat to a small outer-belt asteroid saloon where he meets his former dance partner, and renowned interplanetary fruit thief, the Blueberry Pirate (Joshua Taylor). As payment for his delivery of the cat, Curtis receives a homemade cloning device already in the process of creating a creature most rare in this space quadrant – a Real Live Girl.

At the suggestion of the Blueberry Pirate, Curtis takes the Real Live Girl to Jupiter where women have long been a mystery. There, he proposes a trade with the owner of Jupiter: the Real Live Girl clone for the Boy Who Actually Saw A Woman's Breast (Gregory Russell Cook). The Boy Who Actually Saw A Woman's Breast is regarded as royalty on the all-male mining planet of Jupiter because of his unique and exotic contact with a woman. It is Curtis’ intention to take The Boy to Venus and trade him for the remains of Johnny R., a man who spent his lifetime serving as a human stud for the Southern belles of Venus, a planet populated only by women. Upon returning Johnny R's body to his bereaved family on Earth, Curtis will receive a handsome reward.

While hashing out the plan with the Blueberry Pirate, Curtis is spotted by his nemesis, Professor Hess (Rocco Sisto). Possessed by an enigmatic obsession with Curtis, Hess is capable of killing only without reason; that is, there can be no conflict nor unresolved issues with his intended victim. Hess has been pursuing Samuel Curtis throughout the Solar System in order that he might forgive him, then kill him. Along the way, Hess has executed each and every individual to come into contact with Curtis.

Unaware of this danger, Curtis sets forth on his mission. After retrieving The Boy Who Actually Saw A Woman's Breast from Jupiter, Curtis is contacted by Professor Hess, who makes his intentions known. Fearful, Curtis and The Boy look for a place to hide. They come across a primitive space station constructed by Nevada State silver miners from the late 1800s. Inside they discover a small group of miners still alive, their bodies crippled and deformed by space atrophy. Unable to return home for fear that Earth's gravity would kill them, two of the miners mated and gave birth to a boy known as Body Suit (James Ransone). He has been raised in a suit of hydraulics to simulate Earth's gravity with his parents' intention of him eventually being sent home. In trade for supplies and sanctuary, Curtis agrees to deliver Body Suit to Earth.

Aboard Curtis's ship, he and the Boy try to clean Body Suit and teach him to read before crash landing on Venus. There, Curtis negotiates with Cloris, the Queen of Venus, who will only free his ship and give him the body of Johnny R. if he first presents her with a mate. Curtis discovers that Professor Hess is on Venus, plotting to kill the Boy. Because of this, he decides to present Body Suit as the Venutians' mate. Hess is enraged by this trickery and tries to kill Body Suit, but is unable to do so because he has a reason to kill him. The film ends with Hess delivering a monologue, stating that Curtis traveled to Earth to raise the Boy as his son. Meanwhile, Hess stayed on Venus to raise Body Suit, but was never able to kill him.

== Cast ==
- Cory McAbee as Samuel Curtis / Silver Miner
- Rocco Sisto as Professor Hess
- Greg Russell Cook as The Boy Who Actually Saw A Woman's Breast
- James Ransone as Bodysuit
- Annie Golden as Cloris
- Joshua Taylor as Blueberry Pirate
- Tom Aldredge as Old Man
- Peter McRobbie as Lee Vilensky
- Bill Buell as Eddie
- Mark Manley as Henchman #1 (Hey Boy!)
- Ned Sublette as Henchman #2 (Hey Boy!)
- Joseph McKenna as Doorman
- Doug McKean as Silverminer Jake
- Bentley Wood as Young Johnny R.

== Accolades ==
- Cory McAbee won Special Jury Award at the Florida Film Festival (For original vision)
- W. Mott Hupfel III was nominated for best Cinematography at the Independent Spirit Awards
- Cory McAbee was nominated for the Grand Jury Prize at the Sundance Film Festival
