= Miles (film) =

- Directed by: Nathan Adloff
- Screenplay by: Nathan Adloff; Justin D.M. Palmer
- Produced by: Lisa G. Black; Ash Christian; Anne Clements; Stephen Israel; Devon Schneider
- Starring: Tim Boardman
- Cinematography: Hunter Robert Baker
- Edited by: Yaniv Dabach
- Music by: Justin Bell; Jonathan Levi Shanes
- Release date: May 21, 2016 (Seattle)
- Running time: 90 minutes
- Country: United States
- Language: English

Miles is a 2016 American comedy-drama film starring Tim Boardman as the titular character.

== Cast ==
- Tim Boardman as Miles Walton
- Molly Shannon as Pam Walton
- Missi Pyle as Leslie Wayne
- Paul Reiser as Lloyd Bryant
- Stephen Root as Ron Walton
- Yeardley Smith as Mrs. Armstrong
- Annie Golden as Rhonda Roth
- Ethan Phillips as Mr. Wilson
- Malcolm Gets as Timothy Schultz

== Reception ==
As of December 2022, the film holds an approval rating of 64% on Rotten Tomatoes, based on 11 reviews with an average rating of 6.6/10. Nayanika Kapoor of Common Sense Media awarded the film three stars out of five.
