= Stingray Sam =

- Original theatrical poster
- Directed by: Cory McAbee
- Written by: Cory McAbee
- Produced by: Becky Glupczynski
- Starring: Cory McAbee; Crugie; Joshua Taylor
- Release date: January 20, 2009
- Running time: 61 minutes
- Country: United States
- Language: English

Stingray Sam is a 2009 American space Western musical serial film, directed by and starring Cory McAbee. The film premiered on January 20, 2009 at the 2009 Sundance Film Festival as part of the New Frontier program. It is Cory McAbee's latest film after he was not able to secure financing for what was to be his second feature, Werewolf Hunters of the Midwest.

== Plot ==
According to the official website:

A dangerous mission reunites Stingray Sam with his long lost accomplice, The Quasar Kid. Follow these two space-convicts as they earn their freedom in exchange for the rescue of a young girl who is being held captive by the genetically designed figurehead of a very wealthy planet.

The six episodes are entitled:

- Episode 1: Factory Fugitives
- Episode 2: The Forbidden Chromosome
- Episode 3: The Famous Carpenter
- Episode 4: Corporate Mascot Rehabilitation Program
- Episode 5: Shake Your Shackles
- Episode 6: Heart of a Stingray

== Cast ==
- Cory McAbee as Stingray Sam
- Crugie as Quasar Kid
- Joshua Taylor as Fredward
- Willa Vy McAbee as Girl/The Carpenter's Daughter
- Frank Howard Swart as Barnaby
- Jessica Jelliffe as The Clerk
- Caleb Scott as The Artist
- Michael De Nola as Scientist
- Michael Wiener as Smarmy Scientist
- Ron Crawford as Old Scientist
- Bobby Lurie as Cubby
- David Hyde Pierce as Narrator
- Forrest C. "Frosty" Lawson as Scientist
- Maura Ruth Hashman as Heaven

== Production ==
As financing was not secured for Cory McAbee's film Werewolf Hunters of the Midwest, McAbee began work on a six-part serialized feature film entitled Stingray Sam that was created with the intention of being a multi-platform release or as McAbee calls it "for screens of all sizes". The trailer was made available to the public on November 11, 2008.

According to Tom Fortunato, one of the extras on the set, told The Westfield Leader (newspaper for Westfield, New Jersey) that despite not reading the script, he feels that production will be similar to Richard Elfman's 1980 cult classic The Forbidden Zone.

== Release ==
Stingray Sam premiered on January 20, 2009 at the 2009 Sundance Film Festival as part of the New Frontier program. Stingray Sam was also shown at the Sarasota Film Festival on April 5, 2009, Amsterdam Fantastic Film Festival on April 20, 2009, The Downtown Independent on April 10, 2009, Independent Film Festival of Boston on April 26, 2009, Sci-Fi-London on May 2, 2009, and has continued to screen in numerous festivals throughout the world. The film was supposed to be screened at the Icon International Sci-Fi Film Festival in Tel Aviv in October 2009, but the screening and visit of crew members were cancelled by McAbee in protest of the political situation in Israel towards Palestinians (a similar cancellation also occurred with his film The American Astronaut three years earlier).

On September 15, 2009, Stingray Sam had its theatrical premiere at The Downtown Independent where it was simultaneously broadcast live from the theater on McAbee's website. DVDs and digital downloads became available from his website on the same day as well. Stingray Sam continues to play in theaters both nationally and internationally.

== Reception ==
Dennis Harvey of Variety wrote that "Stingray Sam leaves one begging for more at one unflaggingly delightful hour."
