= Mimi le Duck =

2004 musical by Diana Hansen-Young and Brian Feinstein

Mimi le Duck is a musical with book and lyrics by Diana Hansen-Young and music by Brian Feinstein. Mimi Le Duck premiered at the Adirondack Theater Festival in 2004, followed by a run at the Fringe Festival that same year. The musical opened on November 6, 2006 Off-Broadway at New World Stages. Directed by Tom Caruso, the cast featured Tom Aldredge, Candy Buckley, Robert DuSold, Allen Fitzpatrick, Annie Golden, Ken Jennings, Marcus Neville and Eartha Kitt, with musical staging by Matt West. The production closed on December 3, 2006 after 28 previews and 30 regular performances.

The musical had scenic design by Tony Award-winner John Arnone; costume design by Tony Award-winner Ann Hould-Ward; lighting design by David Lander; and sound design by Tony Smolenski IV and Walter Trarbach.

The plot follows Miriam (Golden), a discontented Mormon housewife from Ketchum, Idaho, who, in a moment of desperate inspiration (and a visit from the ghost of Ernest Hemingway), packs her bags and moves to Paris, leaving behind her husband and her successful career as a painter of duck canvases for QVC.

== Critical reception ==
The show received some of the worst reviews of the 2006–07 season. Neil Genzlinger's review in The New York Times was dismissive, focusing on the legendary status of Eartha Kitt, who plays but a minor role, stating that she was "really [the] only one character worth mentioning". The review went on to say that:

"[a]ssorted other characters materialize, all laboriously wacky. Diana Hansen-Young, who wrote the book and lyrics (the music is by Brian Feinstein), may be the kind of person whose idea of “outrageous” doesn’t go much further than Milton Berle."

Frank Scheck of the New York Post wrote:

"As has become depressingly common lately in musicals, the score by Brian Feinstein (music) and Diana Hansen-Young (book and lyrics) is utterly generic and forgettable, failing to bring any life to the insipid scenario."

Larry Worth of The Hollywood Reporter wrote: "Accordingly, in the spirit of a show where bad puns and hoary platitudes rule, maybe it is fitting that "Mimi le Duck" brings new meaning to foul play."

Variety's was similarly unimpressed stating: "How do you say 'vanity production' in French?"
