= William A. Feilds =

American politician

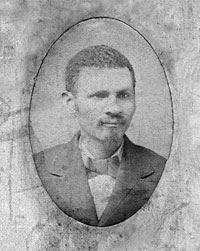

Member of the Tennessee House of Representatives
- In office 1885–1886

Personal details
- Party: Republican

William A. Feilds (Note: Historical records do not agree on the spelling of his surname; it has been alternatively spelled Field, Fields and Feild. According to the state of Tennessee, Feilds himself preferred this spelling.) (between c. 1846 and 1852 – September 9, 1898) was an American schoolteacher and principal who served one term as a Republican legislator in the Tennessee House of Representatives from 1885 to 1886. He was also elected a member of the Shelby County county court, a legislative body, and a justice of the peace. He was born an enslaved person.

The American documentary series Who Do You Think You Are? (2011) revealed that he is the paternal great-great-grandfather of actress, singer and Miss America 1984, Vanessa Williams and of actor Chris Williams and the maternal great-great-great-grandfather of Jillian Hervey.

== See also ==
- African American officeholders from the end of the Civil War until before 1900
