= Begin (Lion Babe album) =

Studio album by Lion Babe
- Released: January 22, 2016 (iTunes); February 5, 2016 (CD)
- Studio: Various: SARM Studios, London; Downtown Music Studios, New York; Quad Studios, New York; Premier Studios, New York; Point Sonic Studios, Brooklyn; LION BABE Studios, New York; South Beach Studio, Miami; Conway Recording Studios, LA; Basement 669, London; A Fine Young Hannibals, LA; Manifest Music, Santa Monica; Night Hunger Studios, Brooklyn; The Joint Recording, Brooklyn
- Genre: Neo soul; alternative R&B; electronic
- Length: 48:10
- Label: Polydor; Interscope

Lion Babe chronology
Lion Babe (2014)	Begin (2016)

Singles from Begin
- 1. "Wonder Woman" Released: March 23, 2015; 2. "Impossible" Released: July 24, 2015; 3. "Where Do We Go" Released: November 20, 2015

Begin is the debut album by American duo Lion Babe. It was released on February 5, 2016, by Interscope Records and Polydor Records.

== Singles ==
- "Wonder Woman" was released as the album's first single on March 23, 2015. It was written and produced with American singer, rapper and record producer Pharrell Williams.
- "Impossible" was released on July 24, 2015 as the second single.
- "Where Do We Go" was the third single to be released from the album on November 20, 2015.

=== Other songs ===
The album also includes "Treat Me Like Fire" and "Jump Hi", which features American actor, voice actor, rapper, songwriter, and writer Childish Gambino. They were released as singles in 2012 and 2013, respectively, from the duo's EP Lion Babe (2014).

== Critical reception ==
Professional ratings
Review scores
Source	Rating
AllMusic	3.5/5 stars
Clash	6/10
Pitchfork	6.2/10
PopMatters	5/10 stars

Andy Kellman of AllMusic said, "Hervey takes cues from forthright soul-funk greats like Chaka Khan, Betty Wright, and Betty Davis, but she has a gentler character that's her own, whether she's singing of body positivity, seducing without compromising herself, or serving up would-be skipping rhymes. Just as crucially, she and Goodman don't act as if innovations in R&B ceased before they were born; most of these songs are as modern sounding as anything aired on radio stations classified as mainstream urban." He was disappointed by some of the collaborations on the record, feeling that "Begin resonates most when Hervey and Goodman are left to themselves". Evan Rytlewski of Pitchfork criticized what he felt was a lack of experimentation, noting that Hervey and Goodman's songs "shuffle between disco, house, and neo-soul. And while they update these styles with the airy, wide-open production aesthetic of modern alternative R&B, their songs are rooted squarely in pop. There are no experimental digressions that might alienate the dance floor... Lion Babe aren't after cred. They're after hits." Dami Solebo of PopMatters said that Lion Babe "appear to play spin the bottle with sub-genres in an effort to make something stick" and that ultimately "many of Lion Babe's ditties fall short of achieving anything in particular, making it a pleasant enough album, but one that is quickly forgettable". Shahzaib Hussain of Clash said that "more often than not, it feels as if too much of the album's soundscape is reliant on retro stylings, when Lion Babe's own idiosyncratic stamp would pack more of a punch", but that "there is enough substance here to surmise Lion Babe's future promise".

== Track listing ==
No.	Title	Writer(s)	Producer(s)	Length
1.	"Whole"	Jillian Hervey; Lucas Goodman; Joel Compass; Amanda Ghost	Joel Compass; Astro Raw	3:18
2.	"Jump Hi" (featuring Childish Gambino)	Hervey; Goodman; Donald Glover; Makeba Riddick	Astro Raw	2:59
3.	"Wonder Woman"	Pharrell Williams; Hervey; Goodman	Pharrell Williams; Astro Raw^{[a]}	3:19
4.	"Impossible"	Hervey; Goodman; Compass; Linden Jay; Ghost; Lewis Jankel; Fred Cox	Astro Raw; Compass; Linden Jay	2:39
5.	"Stressed Out!"	Hervey; Goodman	Astro Raw	3:30
6.	"Satisfy My Love"	Hervey; Goodman	Astro Raw	4:28
7.	"Where Do We Go"	Robin Hannibal; Itai Shapira; Anjulie Persaud; Hervey; Goodman	Astro Raw; Robin Hannibal; Itai Shapira^{[a]}	3:15
8.	"On the Rocks"	Hervey; Goodman; Compass	Astro Raw; Compass	3:38
9.	"Hold On"	Hervey; Goodman; Alexander Shuckburgh	Al Shux; Astro Raw	3:14
10.	"Jungle Lady"	Hervey; Goodman; Joshua Tedla	Astro Raw; Paul Proteus^{[a]}	3:32
11.	"Got Body"	Hervey; Goodman	Astro Raw	3:05
12.	"Everyday Life"	Hervey; Goodman; Andrew Wyatt	Andrew Wyatt; Astro Raw	3:24
13.	"Treat Me Like Fire"	Hervey; Goodman; Eunice Collins	Astro Raw	4:11
14.	"Little Dreamer"	Hervey; Goodman	Astro Raw	3:38

Notes

- Credits adapted from album liner notes.
- ^{^[a]} signifies a co-producer
- "Jump Hi" incorporates elements of "Mr. Bojangles" by Jerry Jeff Walker.

== Release history ==
List of release dates, showing region, formats, label, editions, catalog number and reference
Region	Date	Format(s)	Label	Ref.
Various	5 February 2016	CD; Digital download	Interscope; Polydor	
