= Real Things =

Real Things may refer to:

- "Real Things" (song), a 2003 song by Javine
- Real Things (2 Unlimited album), 1994
- Real Things (Joe Nichols album), 2007 (or the title song)

== See also ==
- The Real Thing (disambiguation)
