= Zygote (album) =

Studio album by John Popper
- Released: September 7, 1999
- Recorded: April–June 1999
- Genre: Rock
- Length: 61:36
- Label: Interscope
- Producer: Terry Manning

Professional ratings
Review scores
Source	Rating
AllMusic	3/5 stars
Rolling Stone	3/5 stars

Zygote is the debut studio album by American singer-songwriter John Popper. Produced by Terry Manning, it was released on September 7, 1999, less than a month after the death of bassist Bobby Sheehan (Popper's friend and fellow member of the band Blues Traveler). Accompanying Popper on the album were drummer Carter Beauford (of the Dave Matthews Band) and guitarist Crugie Riccio, keyboardist Rob Clores and bassist Dave Ares (all three from Cycomotogoat). It peaked at No. 185 on the Billboard 200.

== Track listing ==
1. Miserable Bastard (John Popper) – 7:25
2. Once You Wake Up (Popper) – 3:28
3. Growing in Dirt (Popper) - 4:23
4. Tip the Domino (Popper, Crugie Riccio) - 5:05
5. His Own Ideas (Popper) - 6:44
6. Home (Popper) - 4:00
7. Love for Free (Popper) - 4:04
8. How About Now? (Jonny Lang, Popper) - 3:07
9. Evil in My Chair (Popper) - 4:19
10. Lunatic (Popper, Riccio) - 6:24
11. Open Letter (Popper, Riccio) - 5:15
12. Fledgling (Popper) - 7:22

== Personnel ==
- John Popper- electric (lead) guitar, harmonica, flute, lead vocals
- Crugie Riccio- electric (rhythm) guitar, backing vocals
- Rob Clores- Hammond B-3 organ, piano, synthesizer
- Dave Ares- bass guitar
- Carter Beauford- drums & percussion
