= Stephen Root =

American actor (born 1951)

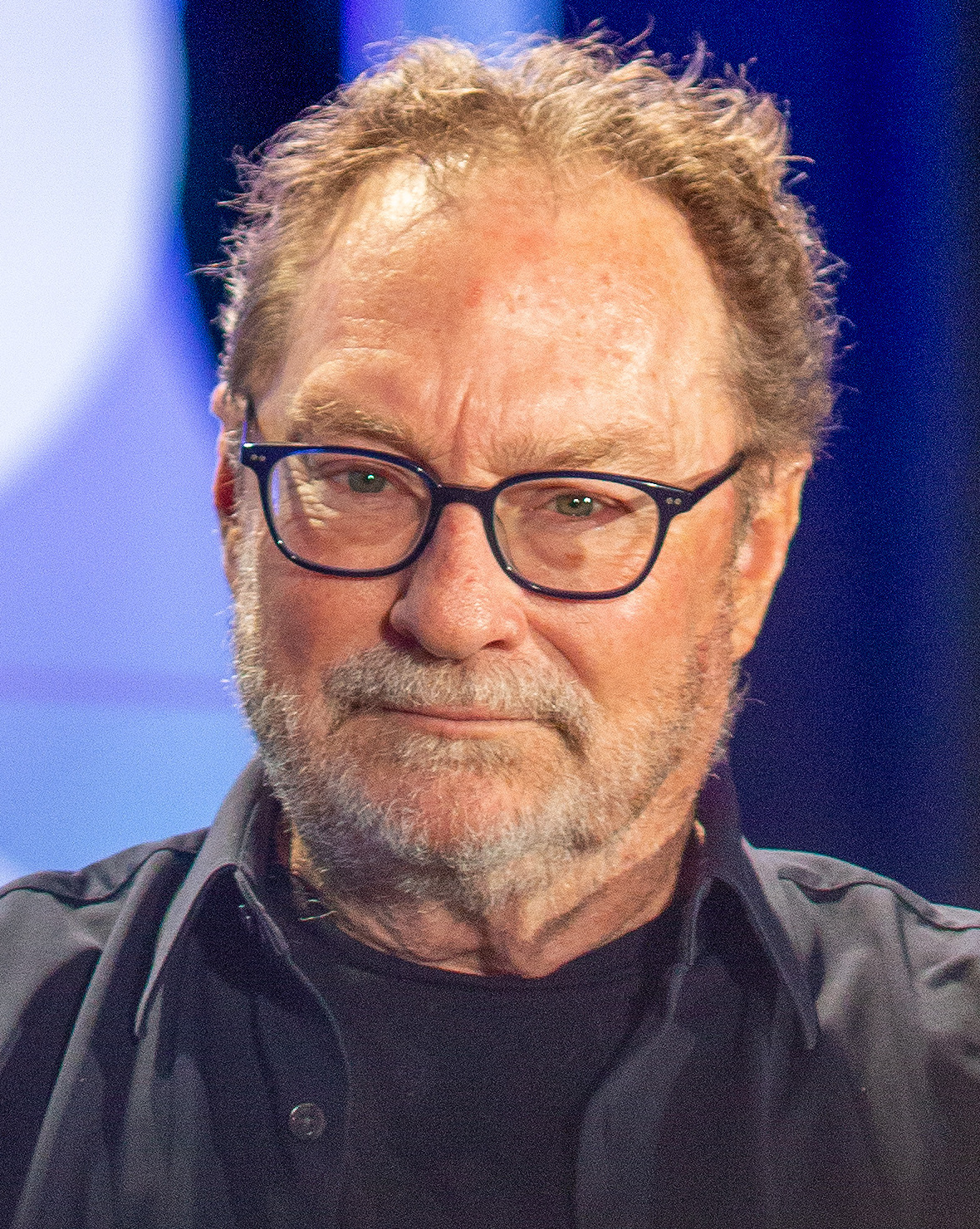
- Root in 2024
- Born: November 17, 1951 (age 75); Sarasota, Florida, U.S.
- Education: University of Florida (BFA)
- Occupation: Actor
- Years active: 1980–present
- Works: Filmography
- Spouses: Laura Joan Hase (m. 1984; div. 1997); Romy Rosemont (m. 2008)
- Children: 1

Stephen Root (born November 17, 1951) is an American actor. Known for his extensive work in film and television, he gained attention for his roles as Jimmy James on the NBC sitcom NewsRadio (1995–1999), as Milton Waddams in the comedy film Office Space (1999), and voiced Bill Dauterive and Buck Strickland on the animated series King of the Hill (1997–2010, 2025–present).

Root has appeared in numerous Coen brothers films including O Brother, Where Art Thou? (2000), The Ladykillers (2004), No Country for Old Men (2007), The Ballad of Buster Scruggs (2018), and The Tragedy of Macbeth (2021). Other film roles include Dave (1993), Bicentennial Man (1999), Dodgeball (2004), Idiocracy (2006), Cedar Rapids (2011), Selma (2014), Trumbo (2015), Get Out (2017), and On the Basis of Sex (2018), as well as his voice roles in Ice Age (2002), Finding Nemo (2003), alongside performance capture in the video game Grand Theft Auto VI (2026).

On television, he played supporting roles in Star Trek: The Next Generation (1991), True Blood (2008–2009), Boardwalk Empire (2012–2013), Fargo (2014), The Man in the High Castle (2016–2019), Perry Mason (2020), and Succession (2021–2023). He has received two Primetime Emmy Award nominations for Outstanding Supporting Actor in a Comedy Series, in 2019 for the role of manipulative hitman handler Monroe Fuches in the HBO dark comedy crime series Barry (2018–2023) and in 2026 for the role of fisherman and outspoken superstitious Wyck Crawford in the Apple TV comedy horror series Widow's Bay (2026–present), which he won.

== Early life and education ==
Root was born in Sarasota, Florida, to Leona Estelle and Rolland Clair Root, a project superintendent and site manager on major civil engineering projects throughout the US and Mexico. He has likened his childhood to that of an Army brat, as his family frequently relocated while his father supervised each construction project.

Root graduated from Vero Beach High School in Vero Beach, Florida. He received his Associate of Arts degree from the University of Florida and trained in the Bachelor in Fine Arts (BFA) acting program. The university recognized him as one of its distinguished alumni in 2008. Subsequently he was granted a BFA after completion of his final semester based on the quality and character of his acting career, having left college to pursue Broadway theater in his final semester.

== Career ==
Root began his career on stage in 1980. He made his Broadway acting debut in the play Journey's End, playing Second Lieutenant Trotter. He also appeared in All My Sons as Frank Lubey, and as Jon in the 2015 play Marjorie Prime.

Root made his feature film debut in the 1988 film Crocodile Dundee II as a DEA agent. That same year, he acted in the psychological horror film Monkey Shines as Dean Burbage. He has a small role as a detective in the movie Ghost (1990), as well as roles in Dave (1993) and RoboCop 3 (1993).

Root has also had many guest appearances in television programs across several genres. He was Klingon Captain K'Vada in the Star Trek: The Next Generation two-part episode "Unification" in 1991. He portrayed the role of an exterminator in the Home Improvement 1991 episode "Wild Kingdom." He played Raymond, a hunting store owner involved in illegal gun trading, in the 1993 In the Heat of the Night episode "A Love Lost." He guest-starred on Seinfeld as a bank manager in the 1996 episode "The Invitations", handling Kramer's hello greeting issue. In the CSI episode "Homebodies" from 2003, he played the father of a rape victim. He had a role in Frasier in the 2004 episode "Detour" as the father of the family helping Frasier when his car broke down.

In the 1993–1994 television season, Root appeared as a series regular as "R.O." on the Beau Bridges/Lloyd Bridges comedy/western series Harts of the West on CBS. He also had a regular role on the short-lived CBS series Ladies Man (1999-2000), which starred Sharon Lawrence soon after she left NYPD Blue.

Among his most recognized television roles are eccentric billionaire Jimmy James on the sitcom NewsRadio (1995–1999), and in a recurring role on the final two seasons of The West Wing (2005–2007) as Republican campaign consultant Bob Mayer. He appeared in many comedy films, particularly as the mumbling, quirky Milton Waddams in Mike Judge's Office Space (1999); head of NorthAm Robotics Dennis Mansky in Bicentennial Man (1999); the mild-mannered gym rat Gordon Pibb in Dodgeball: A True Underdog Story (2004); Judge Hector in a reunion with Mike Judge in Idiocracy (2006); the dimwitted principal in the Judd Apatow-produced comedy Drillbit Taylor (2008); and Suds, a drunk sportswriter, in Leatherheads (2008).

Root is a favorite hire of the Coen brothers. He has appeared in O Brother, Where Art Thou? (2000), The Ladykillers (2004), No Country for Old Men (2007), The Ballad of Buster Scruggs (2018), and The Tragedy of Macbeth (2021). Kevin Smith wrote a role in Jersey Girl (2004) specifically for Root. In addition, Root was cast as Burt Canton for the first installment of Noah Hawley's anthology series Fargo, which is set in the same world as the 1996 Coen brothers film of the same name and heavily inspired by it and other films by the Coen brothers; one of the reasons he was cast was because of his many appearances in their films.

Root also portrayed NASA flight director Chris Kraft in the miniseries From the Earth to the Moon (1998). He took on the biographical role of Richard A. Clarke in The Path to 9/11 (2006).

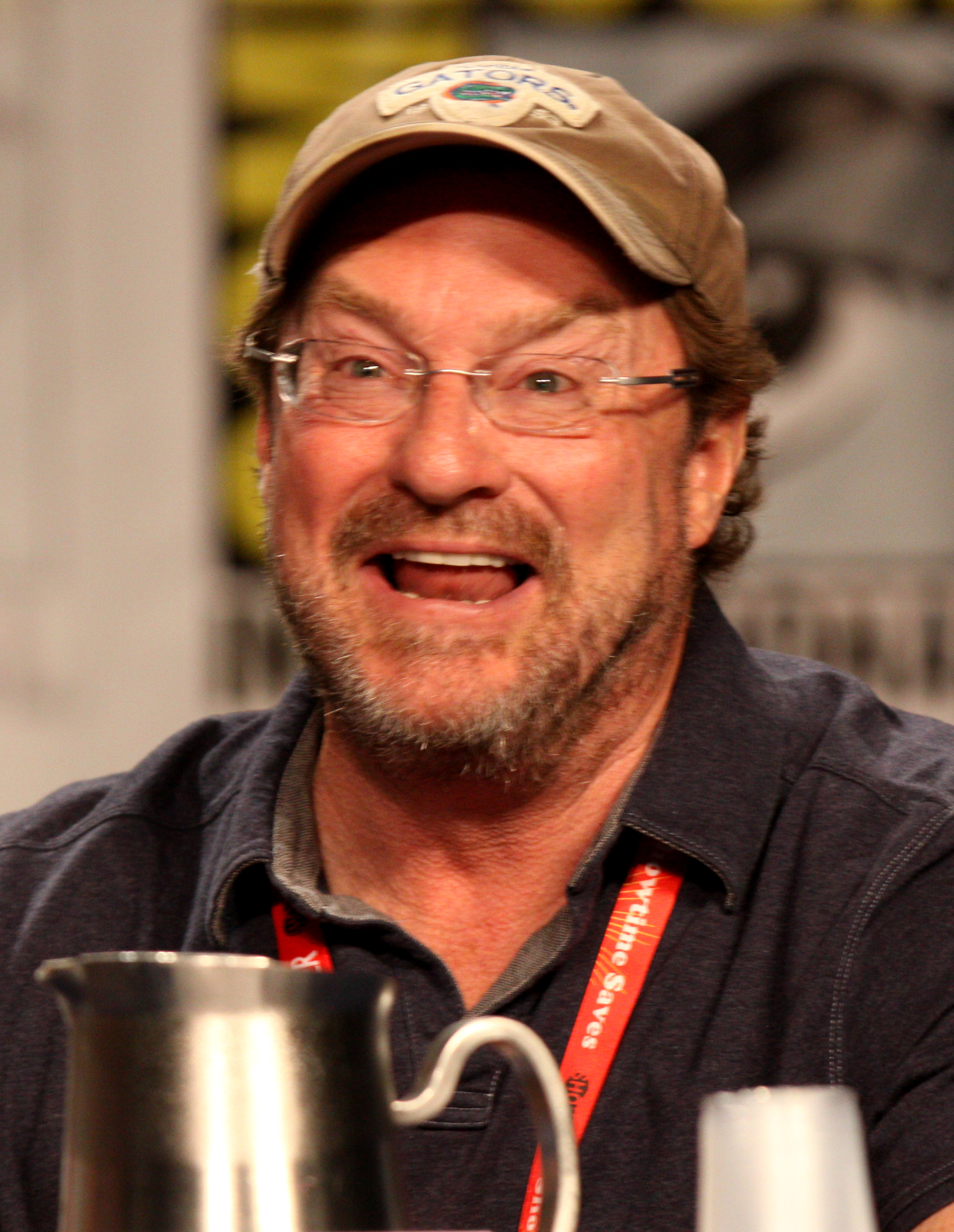
Root at the 2011 San Diego Comic-Con

Root has an active career as a voice actor, including as the voice of divorced, down-and-out Army barber Bill Dauterive, Hank Hill's hedonistic boss Buck Strickland, and various other characters on Mike Judge's animated television series King of the Hill (1997–2010, 2025–present). Root is also heard in animated films such as Ice Age (2002) and its sequel Ice Age: The Meltdown (2006), Finding Nemo (2003) and its sequel Finding Dory (2016), and Rango (2011). In other animated television series, his regular roles include Commander Chode in Tripping the Rift and Homebase in The X's. He has also provided vocal talent in animated television series such as Chowder, Batman: The Brave and the Bold, and Teen Titans. In September 2026, Root confirmed that he voices Brian Heder in the video game Grand Theft Auto VI.

Root has appeared in HBO's series True Blood as Eddie, a vampire. He had a multi-episode arc in the second season of Pushing Daisies on ABC, playing the mysterious Dwight Dixon. He appeared as Johnny Forreals, inventor of the word "boo-yah," on "Cangamangus", an episode of The Sarah Silverman Program on Comedy Central. He appeared in the 2009 comedy film The Men Who Stare at Goats as Gus Lacey. In 2010, he appeared in a multi-episode arc in season 8 of the Fox television series 24 as a probation officer named Bill Prady, and in the FX television series Justified as the eccentric Judge Mike "The Hammer" Reardon, as well as appearing in Robert Redford's The Conspirator, playing John Lloyd, a key witness in the trial of alleged Lincoln conspirator Mary Surratt. His subsequest films have included Cedar Rapids (2011), Selma (2014), Trumbo (2015), Get Out (2017), and On the Basis of Sex (2018).

In 2012, he began playing Gaston Means in season 3 of the acclaimed HBO TV series Boardwalk Empire. From 2015-2016, he portrayed Lynn Boyle, father of Charles Boyle on the show Brooklyn Nine-Nine. In 2018, Root began starring in the HBO series Barry, for which he received a Primetime Emmy Award nomination and four nominations for the Screen Actors Guild Award for Outstanding Performance by an Ensemble in a Comedy Series. In 2020, he appeared as Maynard Barnes in the HBO series Perry Mason, and from 2021 to 2023, he played Ron Petkus in HBO's Succession.

== Personal life ==
Root married his first wife, Laura Joan Hase, with whom he has a son, in 1984. They divorced in August 1997. He married actress Romy Rosemont on December 14, 2008. They co-starred together in several television shows such as Fringe and Masters of Sex. They were due to appear on-screen together in the 2011 horror film Red State, but Rosemont was forced to pull out due to a scheduling conflict with Glee.

== Awards and nominations ==
Award	Year	Category	Work	Result	Ref.
Actor Awards	2017	Outstanding Cast in a Motion Picture	Get Out	Nominated	
Actor Awards	2018	Outstanding Ensemble in a Comedy Series	Barry (season one)	Nominated	
Actor Awards	2019	Outstanding Ensemble in a Comedy Series	Barry (season two)	Nominated	
Actor Awards	2022	Outstanding Ensemble in a Comedy Series	Barry (season three)	Nominated	
Actor Awards	2023	Outstanding Ensemble in a Comedy Series	Barry (season four)	Nominated	
Primetime Emmy Awards	2019	Outstanding Supporting Actor in a Comedy Series	Barry (episode: "berkman ﹥ block")	Nominated	
Primetime Emmy Awards	2026	Outstanding Supporting Actor in a Comedy Series	Widow's Bay (season one)	Won	
MTV Movie Awards	2005	Best On-Screen Team	Dodgeball: A True Underdog Story (Note: (shared with Vince Vaughn, Christine Taylor, Justin Long, Alan Tudyk, Joel David Moore, and Chris Williams))	Nominated	
