= Diana Hansen-Young =

American dramatist

Diana Hansen-Young (born 1947) is an American artist and playwright well known of her works depicting Hawaiian women.

== Early life ==
Born Diana Hansen in Bellingham, Washington in 1947, she was the eldest of 6 children born to Audrey and Wally Hansen. Of her childhood there, she says "I was born into a community of depressed, Mormon Swedish farmers, who put away winter black on Memorial Day in favor of summer navy blue."

In 1964, in high school, she wrote a musical that had a full production. She realized then that she wanted to write musical theatre, but it was a while before she returned to her calling.

In 1966 she moved to Hawaii. Enamoured by the color and warmth of the islands, she made her home there, and was followed shortly by her parents and siblings.

== Political career ==
In 1968, ran for the State Constitutional Convention. She won a seat by 93 votes. Her campaign platform was noted for being down-to-earth; her mother Audrey stood by the highway, waving, holding a sign that read "Mothers For Diana." Diana followed up by standing by the highway with her two Great Danes, waving with a sign that read "Dogs For Diana." She went on to run for the Hawaii State House of Representatives, and won a seat there. At age 20, she was the youngest official to ever hold the title. She lost two subsequent elections for U.S. House of Representatives (District 2), after which, she says, "I was unemployable." Years later, she also lost a race for Mayor of Honolulu.

== Painting ==
Taking scraps of canvas or matting from her parents' frame shop, she started painting scenes of Diamond Head with various combinations of waves, rocks, and palm trees, and sold them on the roadside to make a living after losing her race for U.S. House of Representatives.

One day, she painted a painting of a Hawaiian woman in front of Diamond Head and the painting sold within 5 minutes. She continued painting Hawaiian women for the next 25 years, and her business grew from a roadside stand into a gallery. Her art could be found on mugs, calendars, cards, clothing, and perfume. She wrote and illustrated four art and prose coffee table books, and sold over three hundred thousand prints and 150,000 mugs (through Jack in the Box, JC Penney, Wal-Mart, and QVC). She also founded her own animation company and business that grew to include over 50 employees.

Her art supported her family and their farm. In 1979, she married Gordon Young (later divorced), and her daughters, Heidi and Thekla, were born in 1980 and 1981, respectively. The family lived on a farm in Kahalu'u on the island of Oahu, and Diana expanded her publications to include 10 children's books about the farm, known as Mango Hill, and the fictional adventures of the animals there. They had many pets (horses, dogs, cats, chickens and peacocks) and the farm became known as a home for stray or unwanted animals. Roosters who had lost fights were left at the farm, and an orphaned mongoose was lowered over the fence in a cat carrier.

== Playwright ==
During this time, despite her success as an artist, Diana had been writing plays, novels, short stories, and songs. However, she never submitted the manuscripts, focusing on the career that was providing for her family. But painting was not her calling, and in 1996, she developed severe arthritis in her right arm and hand, and could no longer hold a paint brush. She took this as a sign that painting was no longer right for her.

That same year, in a waiting room, she opened a magazine to a page with an ad for the Graduate Musical Theatre Writing Program at New York University's (NYU) Tisch School of the Arts. She applied, and despite not having a college degree, she was accepted.

She closed her business, rented her farm, and moved with her daughters to New York City. Diana met Brian Feinstein in the graduate program, where they collaborated on many songs and short musicals, finally writing the musical Mimi Le Duck, starring Eartha Kitt, which opened at the New World Stages on November 6, 2006 and closed on December 3, 2006, after 58 performances. Diana has been a published member of Mystery Writers of America since 1979 and has written numerous short mystery stories, and is currently writing and living in Brooklyn with two cats, Jaws and Smudge.
