= The Courage to Love =

- Written by: Heather Hale; Toni Ann Johnson
- Directed by: Kari Skogland
- Starring: Vanessa Williams
- Countries of origin: United States; Canada
- Original language: English

Production
- Producer: Vanessa L. Williams
- Running time: 95 min
- Production companies: Motion International; New Star Television

Original release
- Network: Lifetime
- Release: January 24, 2000

The Courage to Love is a 2000 television history film starring Vanessa L. Williams, who was also the producer. The premiere was held on 24 January 2000 on Lifetime. The film also stars Williams's children: Jillian Hervey, Melanie Hervey, Devin Hervey, and her brother Chris Williams. Filming began in August 1999 in Toronto, Ontario, Canada, and was scheduled to last two months.

== Plot ==
Henriette Delille, a free woman of color, was born in 1813 into one of New Orleans' most prominent families. Her family assumed she would follow her mother and sister's path and become a mistress for a wealthy white man. However, Henriette had different plans for her life.

== Cast ==
- Vanessa Williams as Mother Henriette Delille
- Gil Bellows as Dr. Gerard Gautier
- Karen Williams as Julie Gadin
- Lisa Bronwyn Moore as Marie Alicot
- David La Haye as Father Rousselon
- Cynda Williams as Cecelia Delille
- Diahann Carroll as Pouponne
- Stacy Keach as Jean Baptiste
- Kevin Jubinville as Frank Morgan
- Chris Williams as Master of Ceremonies
