= Chris Williams (actor) =

American actor and comedian

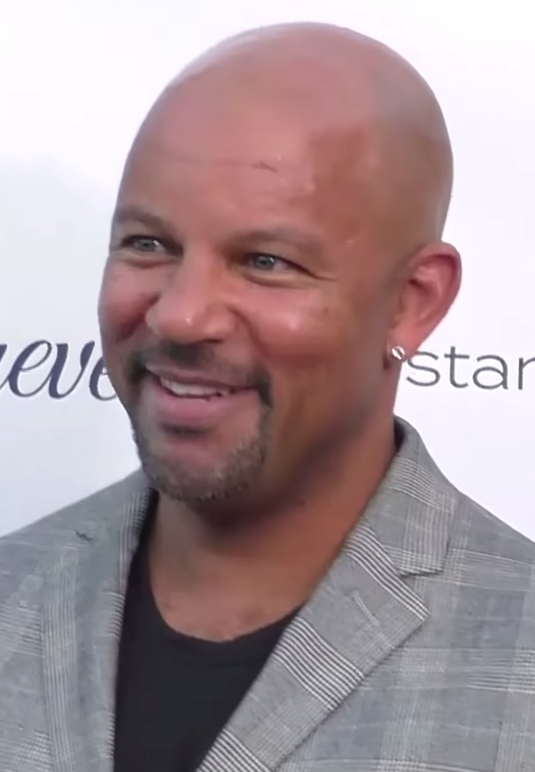
- Williams in 2016
- Born: Westchester County, New York
- Occupations: Actor; voice actor; comedian
- Years active: 1992–present
- Relatives: Vanessa Williams (sister); Jillian Hervey (niece)
- Website: www.instagram.com/chris.williams_

Chris Williams is an American actor, voice actor, and comedian. His roles include starring as "Eddie" on the CBS series The Great Indoors.

== Career ==
Williams has appeared on numerous television shows including CSI, JAG, The Shield, Weeds, Reno 911!, Californication, and popularly as fictional rap artist Krazee-Eyez Killa on Curb Your Enthusiasm.

He played Dwight Baumgarten in the 2004 comedy Dodgeball: A True Underdog Story.

He appeared as Tina in the 2005 film The World's Fastest Indian with Anthony Hopkins.

In 2007, he guest starred on Monk in the episode "Mr. Monk and the Really, Really Dead Guy". On February 3, 2010, he made an appearance on his older sister Vanessa Williams' series Ugly Betty as Wilhelldiva Hater, a female impersonator of her character.

In 2012, he was featured in an Apple commercial. In 2016, he began playing the role of the bodyguard of tech billionaire Gavin Belson on the HBO comedy series Silicon Valley.

== Personal life ==
Williams was raised Catholic and is a graduate of Georgetown University. He is the great-great-grandson of Republican politician William A. Fields, a former slave who became an African-American legislator in the Tennessee House of Representatives. He is also of English, Welsh, Irish, Finnish, Italian, and Portuguese descent.

In November 1990, Williams was a contestant on the NBC game show Classic Concentration, where he won $31,464 in cash and prizes, including a $15,000+ Jeep Wrangler.

== Filmography ==
=== Film ===
| Year | Title | Role | Notes |
|---|---|---|---|
| 1994 | Blankman | Production Manager | |
| 1995 | Major Payne | Marksman | |
| 1995 | Nothing Lasts Forever | Brother at Funeral | TV movie |
| 1999 | Nice Guys Sleep Alone | TV Testimonial #2 | |
| 1999 | Personals | Blue Eyed Man | |
| 2000 | The Courage to Love | Master of Ceremonies | TV movie |
| 2001 | A Kitty Bobo Show | Paul Dog (voice) | TV Short |
| 2001 | Octopus 2: River of Fear | Payton / X-Ray | Video |
| 2002 | Friday After Next | Broadway Bill | |
| 2003 | Max Payne: Hero | Nigel | Short |
| 2003 | Tracey Ullman in the Trailer Tales | Assistant director | TV movie |
| 2004 | Pixel Perfect | Daryl Fibbs | TV movie |
| 2004 | Mean Jadine | Boyfriend #3 | Short |
| 2004 | Dodgeball: A True Underdog Story | Dwight | |
| 2005 | The World's Fastest Indian | Tina | |
| 2005 | Bam Bam and Celeste | Malik | |
| 2006 | Scary Movie 4 | Marcus | |
| 2006 | Swedish Auto | Bobby | |
| 2007 | Look | George Higgins | |
| 2007 | Urban Decay | 2-Much | |
| 2008 | A Line in the Sand | Sammy | |
| 2008 | The Dark Horse | The Chaser | Short |
| 2009 | Still Waiting... | Chuck | Video |
| 2009 | The Joneses | Billy | |
| 2010 | Lottery Ticket | Doug | |
| 2010 | The Confidant | Ozzie | |
| 2013 | Dealin' with Idiots | Bengal Bob | |
| 2013 | The Best Man Holiday | Dr. Nelson (voice) | |
| 2014 | Squatters | Detective | Video |
| 2014 | Sex Ed | Rev. Hamilton | |
| 2014 | Grumpy Cat's Worst Christmas Ever | Lance the Hamster (voice) | TV movie |
| 2015 | Her First Black Guy | Chris | Short |
| 2015 | Human | Boyfriend (voice) | Short |
| 2016 | Tri | Max | |
| 2016 | Jimmy Vestvood: Amerikan Hero | ICE Agent | |
| 2016 | She's Got a Plan | Roger | |
| 2016 | Diani & Devine Meet the Apocalypse | Brad | |
| 2017 | Graham: A Dog's Story | Graham | Short |
| 2019 | Adopt a Highway | - | |
| 2022 | Hollywood Stargirl | George | |

=== Television ===
| Year | Title | Role | Notes |
|---|---|---|---|
| 1990 | Classic Concentration | Himself / contestant | Episodes dated November 7–8, 1990 |
| 1992 | The Fresh Prince of Bel-Air | Paramedic #1 | Episode: "A Funny Thing Happened on the Way Home from the Forum" |
| 1993 | Where I Live | Boyfriend | Episode: "Opposites Attack" |
| 1994 | All-American Girl | Waiter | Episode: "Loveless in San Francisco" |
| 1995 | JAG | Helmsman | Episode: "Shadow" |
| 1995 | Cybill | Piano Bar Waiter | Episode: "Nice Work If You Can Get It" |
| 1996 | Intimate Portrait | Himself | Episode: "Vanessa Williams" |
| 1996 | Martin | Donnie | Episode: "The Bodyguard" |
| 1996 | Buddies | Eddie | Episode: "John, I've Been Thinking" |
| 1997 | The Pretender | Derek Kobey | Episode: "Ranger Jarod" |
| 1997 | Profiler | Attendant | Episode: "Shadow of Angels: Part 2" |
| 1997 | Beverly Hills, 90210 | Car Washer | Episode: "Comic Relief" |
| 2000–01 | Hype | Various | Main Cast |
| 2002 | Curb Your Enthusiasm | Krazee-Eyez Killa | Episode: "Krazee-Eyez Killa" |
| 2003 | Hey Monie! | Raekwon | Episode: "Getta Life" |
| 2004 | The Shield | Agent Quigley | Episode: "Playing Tight" |
| 2004 | Reno 911! | Blind Witness | Episode: "Security for Kenny Rogers" |
| 2004 | Listen Up | Willie | Episode: "Cool Jerk" |
| 2005 | CSI: Crime Scene Investigation | Lt. Reed Owens | Episode: "Committed" |
| 2006 | Weeds | Tyrell | Episode: "Cooking with Jesus" |
| 2007 | E! True Hollywood Story | Himself | Episode: "Vanessa Williams" |
| 2007 | Monk | Agent Thorpe | Episode: "Mr. Monk and the Really, Really Dead Guy" |
| 2007 | The Wedding Bells | Ralph Snow | Main Cast |
| 2007–11 | Californication | Todd Carr | Recurring Cast: Season 1, Guest: Season 4 |
| 2008 | The Boondocks | Homo D (voice) | Episode: "The Story of Gangstalicious: Part 2" |
| 2008 | CSI: Miami | Peter Cullen | Episode: "Down to the Wire" |
| 2009 | WordGirl | Judge (voice) | Episode: "Granny Mayor/Tobey Goes Good" |
| 2009 | 24 | Phil | Episode: "Day 7: 8:00 a.m.-9:00 a.m." & "Day 7: 9:00 a.m.-10:00 a.m." |
| 2009 | Sherri | Doug Davis | Episode: "All in the Timing" |
| 2010 | Biography | Himself | Episode: "Vanessa Williams" |
| 2010 | Ugly Betty | Wilhediva Hater Robert | Episode: "Chica and the Man" |
| 2012 | Kitchen Cousins | Himself | Episode: "Vanessa Williams Kitchen Surprise" |
| 2012 | Bones | Mike Grassley | Episode: "The Suit on the Set" |
| 2012 | Animal Practice | Hubert Queel | Episode: "The Two George Colemans" |
| 2012 | Happy Endings | Officer Sommers | Episode: "Boys II Menorah" |
| 2012–14 | Family Time | Todd Stallworth | Guest: Season 1, Recurring Cast: Season 2 |
| 2013 | Hot in Cleveland | Dr. Greenly | Episode: "Corpse Bride" |
| 2014 | Satisfaction | Lawrence | Recurring Cast: Season 1 |
| 2015 | One Big Happy | Roy | Main Cast |
| 2016 | 2 Broke Girls | Perry Tyler | Episode: "And the Lost Baggage" |
| 2016 | The Soul Man | Mervin | Episode: "Hangin' with Mr. Cupper" |
| 2016 | Dice | Marvin | Recurring Cast: Season 1 |
| 2016 | Better Things | Modi | Recurring Cast: Season 1 |
| 2016–17 | The Great Indoors | Eddie | Main Cast |
| 2016–19 | Silicon Valley | Hoover | Recurring Cast: Season 3–6 |
| 2017 | Curb Your Enthusiasm | Krazee-Eyez Killa | Episode: "Never Wait for Seconds!" |
| 2018 | Legends & Lies | Bill Baker | Episode: "The Civil War: Brother vs. Brother" |
| 2018 | Young & Hungry | Captain | Episode: "Young & Yacht'in" |
| 2018 | Fortune Rookie | Chris | Episode: "Business Is Booming" |
| 2019 | Florida Girls | Harold | Recurring Cast |
| 2019 | A Black Lady Sketch Show | Kwame | Episode: "3rd & Bonaparte Is Always in the Shade" |
| 2020 | Extraction | Dr. Prince | Recurring Cast |
| 2020–22 | Upload | Dave Antony | Recurring Cast |
| 2022 | Real Comedians Challenge Show | Dwight | Episode: "Dodgeball Challenge" |
| 2022 | Dollface | Andre | Episode: "Homecoming Queen" |
| 2022–23 | The Upshaws | Larry | Guest: Season 2 & 4, Recurring Cast: Season 3 |
| 2023 | CSI: Vegas | Ken Yacoob | Episode: "When the Dust Settles" |
| 2023 | Animal Control | Oak | Episode: "Hellhounds and Sturgeons" |
| 2026 | The Varnell Hill Show | Trey | Main Cast |

=== Video Games ===
| Year | Title | Role |
|---|---|---|
| 2002 | Minority Report: Everybody Runs | Ben Moseley |
| 2005 | NBA '06 | Assistant coach |
| 2005 | Crash Tag Team Racing | Crunch Bandicoot |
| 2005 | Need for Speed: Most Wanted | Sergeant Cross |
| 2006 | Saints Row | Marshall Winslow, Radio Voice |
| 2006 | Open Season | Boog, Duck #3, Security Guard |
| 2006 | Pimp My Ride | Various |
| 2006 | Need for Speed Carbon | Sergeant Cross |
| 2007 | Spider-Man 3 | Additional Voices |
| 2007 | Surf's Up | Boog |
| 2007 | Crash of the Titans | Crunch Bandicoot, Tiny Tiger |
| 2008 | Crash: Mind Over Mutant | Crunch Bandicoot |
| 2012 | Syndicate | Additional Voices |
| 2017 | Need for Speed: Payback | Sergeant Cross |
| 2022 | River City Girls 2 | Paul/Yakuza Baller (voice) |
