= The Real Thing (Vanessa Williams song) =

Single by Soul Seekerz vs. Vanessa Williams

from the album The Real Thing
- Released: June 2, 2009
- Recorded: 2009
- Studio: Legacy Recording Studios (New York, NY); Peaceful Waters Music (New York, USA)
- Genre: R&B
- Length: 5:12
- Label: Concord
- Songwriter: Stevie Wonder
- Producer: Soul Seekerz

Soul Seekerz singles chronology
"Reach for the Love" (2008)	"The Real Thing" (2009)	"Dancing On The Ceiling" (2010)

Vanessa Williams singles chronology
"Close to You" (2009)	"The Real Thing" (2009)	"Legs (Keep Dancing)" (2024)

Audio video
- "The Real Thing" on YouTube

"The Real Thing" is a song by American recording artist Vanessa Williams. It was written by Stevie Wonder and was released with a Soul Seekerz dance remix. The song appears on "The Real Thing", Williams' eighth studio album. It was released on June 2, 2009, by Concord Records, as the fourth single from the album.

The song was originally recorded by Sergio Mendes & Brasil '77 in 1977 and released as a single, charting on Billboard at #51 on the R&B chart and #50 on the Adult Contemporary chart. It has also been covered by Brazilian vocalist Bebel Gilberto.

== Track listing ==
- CD single
1. "The Real Thing" (Soul Seekerz Ibiza Radio Edit) — 3:20
2. "The Real Thing" (Soul Seekerz Ibiza Club Mix) — 7:00
3. "The Real Thing" (Soul Seekerz Ibiza Dub Mix) — 7:00
4. "The Real Thing" — 5:12
- Dance Remixes
1. "The Real Thing" (Ralphi Rosario Club Mix) — 9:04
2. "The Real Thing" (Maurice Joshua Nu Soul Mix) — 8:25
3. "The Real Thing" (Soul Seekerz Ibiza Club Mix) — 7:00
4. "The Real Thing" (Ralphi Rosario Radio Edit) — 3:59
5. "The Real Thing" (Maurice Joshua Nu Soul Mix Radio Edit) — 4:34
6. "The Real Thing" (Soul Seekerz Ibiza Radio Edit) — 3:19
7. "The Real Thing" (Ralphi Rosario Dub Mix) — 6:50
8. "The Real Thing" (Maurice Joshua Nu Soul Dub Mix) — 7:39
9. "The Real Thing" (Soul Seekerz Ibiza Dub Mix) — 7:00
10. "The Real Thing" (Maurice Joshua Nu Soul Vocal Dub Mix) — 7:39
11. "The Real Thing" (Maurice Joshua Nu Soul Instrumental Mix) — 8:25

== Charts ==
Chart (2009)	Peak position
US Dance Club Songs (Billboard)	6
