= Lion Babe =

American contemporary R&B duo

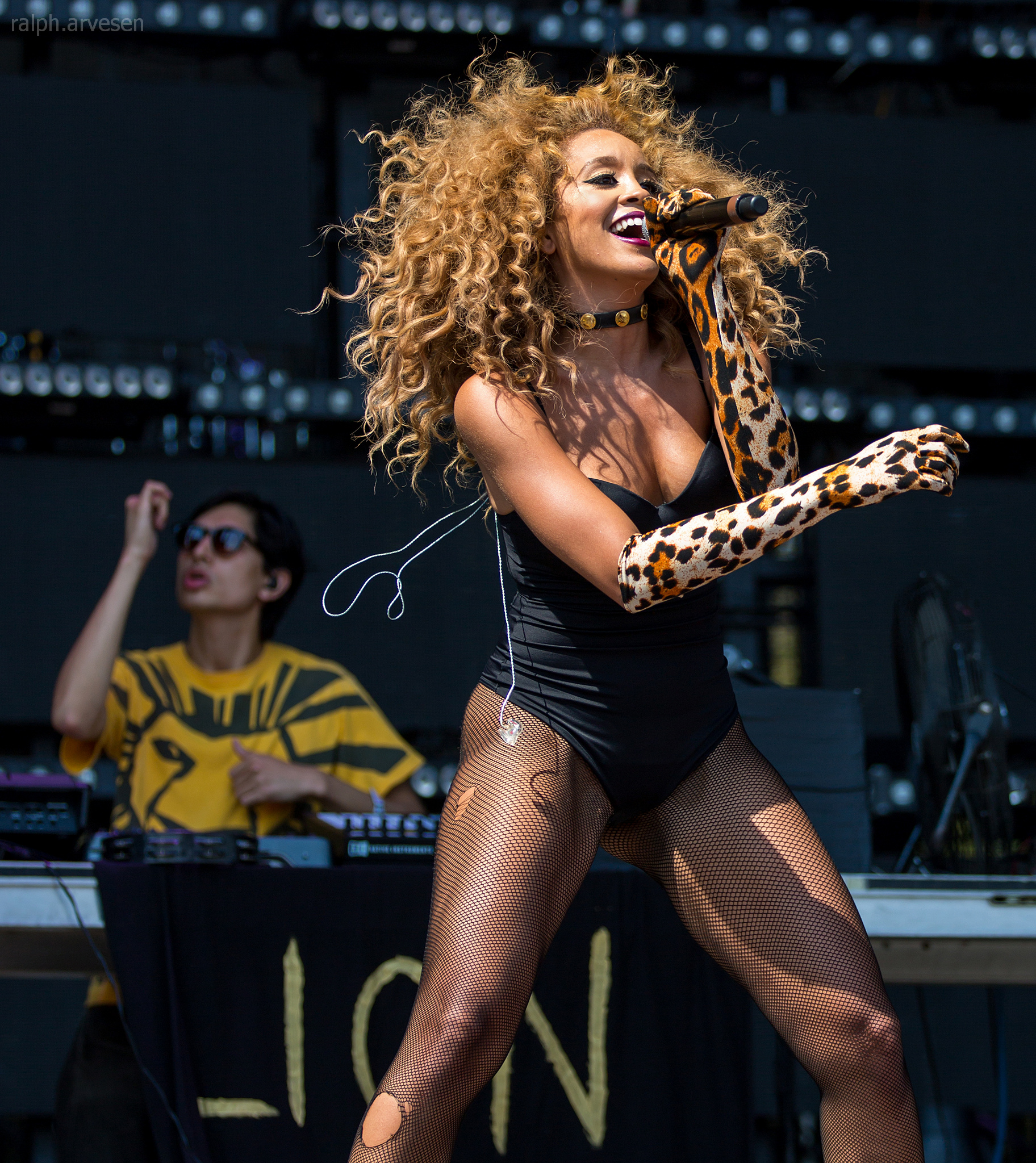
- Lion Babe performing at the Austin City Limits Music Festival in October 2015

Background information
- Origin: New York City, New York, US
- Genres: Alternative R&B; neo soul
- Years active: 2012–present
- Label: Interscope
- Members: Jillian Hervey; Lucas Goodman
- Website: lionbabe.com

Lion Babe is an American R&B duo from New York City, consisting of singer Jillian Hervey and record producer Lucas Goodman. Following their meeting through a mutual friend, the pair released the single "Treat Me Like Fire" in 2012, which raised their profile and led them to sign a record deal with Interscope Records. Following the signing, the duo released their self-titled debut EP in 2014, and their first studio album in 2016. Their second album was not released until 2019, on their own label.

== Career ==
=== 2012–2014: Career beginnings ===
Jillian Hervey, the daughter of actress Vanessa Williams and Ramon Hervey II, initially planned to pursue a career in dancing. Lucas Goodman began producing in his dorm room at Northeastern University before moving back to New York and interning at retro-minded Truth & Soul Records. During this time he found a vinyl version of Eunice Collins' "At the Hotel 1974" and would go on to sample it for "Treat Me Like Fire." The pair met through a mutual friend at a party where Hervey heard Goodman's music, during this time she introduced herself to Goodman but the pair failed to stay connected, however did follow each other on the social networking website MySpace. Hervey then moved to New York for college, where she attended The New School. For a dance assignment, she then contacted Lucas for original music. This led to Hervey discussing her interest in singing and Goodman encouraged Hervey to try a soulful style of singing similar to that of Lauryn Hill and Erykah Badu.

We wanted there to be a certain duality, like there is with Blondie, with me as the frontwoman, you might think I'm Lion Babe, but it's like, no, we're Lion Babe. We liked that. It's about embracing your uniqueness and rocking it.

—Jillian Hervey, speaking to Billboard magazine about the duo's stage name.

The duo went on to name themselves "Lion Babe" which they described as taking on further meaning over time, the name stemmed from Lucas' horoscope sign a Leo and Hervey's hairstyle. The duo released "Treat Me Like Fire" in December 2012. During SXSW the following March, rapper Childish Gambino (Donald Glover) contacted Lion Babe and asked them to open for him. The duo subsequently acquired a US record deal with Interscope and a UK deal with Polydor that summer, and kept in touch with Glover who would go to guest on the lead single, "Jump Hi," from their self-titled debut extended play.

On November 18, 2014, "Treat Me Like Fire" surfaced among the new songs in Rockstar Games' PlayStation 4 and Xbox One releases of Grand Theft Auto V's in-game radio station, Worldwide FM. On December 15, Lion Babe released their debut self-titled extended play digitally alongside the digital release the duo released vinyl and stream versions of the project with two extra songs. The EP was written and produced by Hervey and Goodman, under his production name "Astro Raw" and received positive reviews from music critics who described it as "a warm-blooded blend of soul, R&B and electronica" and noted similarities between Hervey and Erykah Badu. Rapper Childish Gambino was the only other artist who made an appearance on the EP, appearing on the song "Jump Hi' making the collaboration the trio's second. The song "Jump Hi" featuring Gambino would later go on to peak at number nine on Billboard's interactive chart Billboard Twitter Emerging Artists.

=== 2015: Begin ===
The duo began work on their debut album, which was released in February 2016. Besides Goodman, the album features production input from Pharrell Williams and Dave Sitek, among others. Lion Babe announced that they would be producing their debut with friends and working with Mark Ronson, and that they had recorded another song with rapper Childish Gambino. Hervey described the album's sound as being eclectic with influences of soul, dance, hip-hop and pop, and with "positive" lyrical content comprising messages of empowerment.

In 2015, Lion Babe released the song "Wonder Woman" which went on to peak at number one on Billboard's interactive chart Billboard Twitter Emerging Artists. Lion Babe were featured on Disclosure's "Hourglass", from their studio album Caracal (2015), the single was released on 11 September 2015, as the third promotional from the album.

In October 2016, the duo was picked as Elvis Duran's Artist of the Month appearing on NBC's show Today with Hoda Kotb and Kathie Lee Gifford performing a cover of Tom Jones' "She's a Lady".

== Artistry ==
Lucas Goodman is inspired by and studied the work of producers J Dilla, Flying Lotus and Timbaland. Speaking on his influences Goodman stated "Their techniques were like magic to me," during his production Goodman tries to bring funk and soul into a modern context, with the goal to create an iconic performance and a music brand similar to Prince and Iggy Pop. Goodman also takes production influence from rappers RZA and Kanye West, as well as Just Blaze. Throughout high school, Goodman began playing the guitar and cited Jimi Hendrix and Led Zeppelin as influences. Goodman also states that he is influenced by the city of New York describing it as a "melting pot" for "all sorts of other things".

Hervey states she is inspired by "classic vocalists" including Marvin Gaye, Al Green, Tina Turner, Chaka Khan as well as Erykah Badu. Throughout their childhood the pair both grew up listening to artists such as Curtis Mayfield and Sly Stone, whilst Goodman stated that music that touched up on the early 2000s was as influence such as The Neptunes as well as The Strokes and the White Stripes. As a duo they stated that The Beatles are a huge influence on their musical style and also listen to various other artists from various genres including Lee Scratch Perry, Sergio Mendes in Brazil, and Fela Kuti. Both Hervey and Goodman stated they were inspired by singer and producer Pharrell Williams, stating they grew up listening to his music and his production.

== Members ==
Current members

- Jillian Hervey – vocals
- Lucas Goodman – production

== Discography ==
=== Studio albums ===
List of albums, with selected details
Title	Details
Begin	Released: February 5, 2016; Label: Interscope, Polydor; Format: CD, digital download
Cosmic Wind	Released: March 29, 2019; Label: Lion Babe; Format: CD, digital download, streaming, vinyl
Rainbow Child	Released: August 6, 2021; Label: Lion Babe; Format: Digital download, streaming, vinyl
House of LION BABE	Released: September 20, 2024; Label: Lion Babe; Format: Digital download, streaming

=== Extended plays ===
List of extended plays with selected details
Title	Album details
Lion Babe	Released: January 1, 2014; Label: Interscope, Polydor; Format: Digital download, vinyl

=== Singles ===
Title	Year	Peak chart positions	Album
Title	Year	FRA	Album
"Treat Me Like Fire"	2012	—	Begin
"Jump Hi" (featuring Childish Gambino)	2013	—	Begin
"Wonder Woman"	2015	—	Begin
"Impossible"	2015	—	Begin
"Where Do We Go"	2015	—	Begin
"Endless Summer"	2016	—	Non-album singles
"She's a Lady"	2016	65	Non-album singles
"Rockets" (featuring Moe Moks)	2017	—	Non-album singles
"Got Body"	2017	—	Begin
"Honey Dew"	2018	—	Cosmic Wind
"The Wave" (featuring Leikeli47)	2018	—	Cosmic Wind
"Western World" (featuring Raekwon)	2019	—	Cosmic Wind
"Sexy Please"	2020	—	Cosmic Wind
"Different Planet"	2020	—	Cosmic Wind
"Cosmic Wind"	2020	—	Cosmic Wind
"Hot in Herre"	2020	—	Non-album singles
"Can't Get Enough"	2020	—	Non-album singles
"Umi Says"	2020	—	Non-album singles
"Native New Yorker"	2021	—	Non-album singles
"Frida Kahlo"	2021	—	Rainbow Child
"Signs" (with Siimbiie Lakew)	2021	—	Rainbow Child
"Get Up" (with Trinidad James)	2021	—	Rainbow Child
"Rainbows" (with Ghostface Killah)	2021	—	Rainbow Child
"It's Okay" (with Oshun)	2021	—	Rainbow Child

=== As featured artist ===
List of singles as featured artist, with selected chart positions and certifications, showing year released and album name
Title	Year	Peak chart positions		Album
Title	Year	FRA	UK	Album
"Hourglass" Disclosure (featuring Lion Babe)	2015	148	80	Caracal
