= Jillian Hervey =

American musical artist (born 1989)

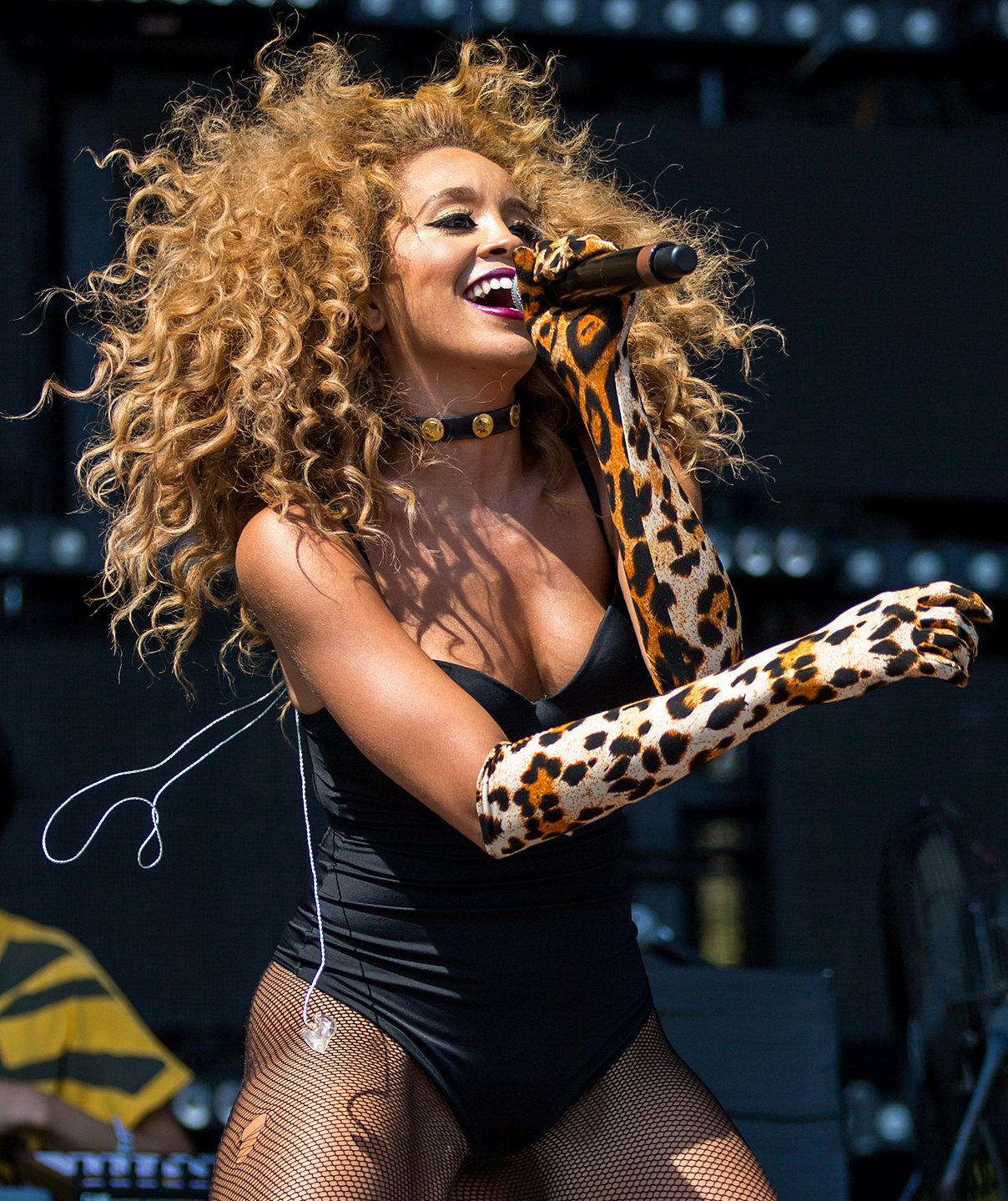
- Hervey performing at 2015 Austin City Limits Music Festival

Background information
- Born: Jillian Kristin Hervey; June 19, 1989 (age 37); Los Angeles, California, U.S.
- Genres: Neo soul; alternative R&B; electronic
- Occupations: Dancer; singer
- Member of: Lion Babe

Jillian Kristin Williams (née Hervey; born June 19, 1989) is an American dancer, singer, and vocalist for the musical duo Lion Babe. She is the daughter of Ramon Hervey II and singer, actress, and former Miss America Vanessa Williams.

== Early life ==
In addition to parents Ramon Hervey II and Vanessa Williams, Jillian Hervey is the niece of actor Chris Williams and the great-great-great-granddaughter of William A. Feilds, a formerly enslaved African-American who was elected to the Tennessee House of Representatives during Reconstruction; the latter connection was uncovered when the television show Who Do You Think You Are? traced the family's genealogy. In addition to having African-American heritage, Hervey is also of English, Welsh, Irish, Finnish, Italian, French and Portuguese descent.

Hervey was raised Catholic.

Hervey grew up in Chappaqua, New York, dividing time between the homes of her parents who divorced when she was eight. She has remarked on her experience of being, in her words, "the only black girl, ever, in any capacity" growing up, as well as her awareness of the harassment her mother faced after she was the first African-American woman to be crowned Miss America. Hervey told the Telegraph, "Even when I was a child, I knew...When my mom would go on her tours, and she was in Alabama and there were snipers on rooftops trying to kill her, or people would send her envelopes with pubic hair inside."

Hervey took up guitar at age 11 and studied dance at the New School, where she also became interested in performance art. During her time at the New School, Hervey began working with eventual Lion Babe collaborator Lucas Goodman. The two had met years earlier at a party, and Hervey reached out to him when a dance assignment at school required original music.

In 2022, Hervey announced on Lion Babe’s instagram that on December 28, 2021 she gave birth to her and Goodman’s first child together.

== Career ==
=== Film and television ===
In 2000, Hervey appeared in the Lifetime television movie The Courage to Love. The film was an historical drama starring Hervey's mother Vanessa Williams as Henriette Delille, a free woman of color who was born into a prominent New Orleans family in 1813.

Reportedly Hervey was also offered a role on Gossip Girl when she was 19, but declined in favor of pursuing music.

In 2012, Hervey appeared in an episode of RuPaul's Drag Race, performing the song "Glamazon" with contestants.

=== Music ===
In December 2012, Hervey and Lucas Goodman released "Treat Me Like Fire", their first song as the duo Lion Babe, putting Hervey's "towering cloud of golden curls and honeyed voice...in near-instant demand," according to Vogue Magazine. The duo has subsequently collaborated with Pharrell Williams, Mark Ronson, and Childish Gambino. In 2014 they released another new single, "Jungle Lady," with Essence saying "Talent must run in the family. Vanessa William's daughter, singer Jillian Hervey, just released a new single, Jungle Lady, and we can't stop listening to the sultry song."

In July 2015 Lion Babe played Lollapalooza. In 2016, Lion Babe released their first album, Begin.

Considering Hervey in terms of a "carefree black girl ecosystem" with Willow Smith, Zoe Kravitz and FKA twigs, Safy-Hallan Farah said in Pitchfork that Hervey's "appeal is a throwback to Erykah [Badu] and Corinne Bailey Rae at the same damn time, which is quite a feat."

The San Francisco Chronicle also compared Hervey to Badu: "Channeling Erykah Badu's style and approach, Hervey makes tracks such as 'Whole' and 'Satisfy My Love' her own, calling forth a flittering, jazzy tenor. Other times, Hervey reveals a smoky timbre that glides across the beat, as in 'Hold On.'"

=== Beauty and fashion ===
In early 2016, Hervey became a spokeswoman for MAC Cosmetics as part of a campaign called "Future Forward" focused on up-and-coming musicians, including Dej Loaf and Tinashe, also women of color. Already noted for "her signature cat-eye flick coated in gold glitter," Situating Hervey's role at MAC alongside Taraji P. Henson's own MAC campaign and Kerry Washington's role at Neutrogena, The Observer describes their work as a significant departure from the way "historically, people of color have been absent from the campaigns and offerings of major beauty brands" in the U.S.

In June 2016, Hervey also became a representative for Pantene hair products, drawing press coverage for the selection's departure from major hair care brands' historical focus on long, straight hair and the encouragement, as US Weekly put it, to "fellow curly girls to celebrate their texture." Hervey has expressed excitement at becoming "a voice for girls with curls"; in a Glamour article called "How Lion Babe's Jillian Hervey Learned to Love Her Curly Hair", Hervey described facing taunts from schoolmates for her curly hair and how important it was to her that she also had a "bunch of my girlfriends at the time [who] were like, 'You should wear your hair natural and curly it looks so good.'" She also said that moving to New York and the diversity she encountered there "led me to feel more free, take more risks, and go back into my natural hair." Speaking at Essence Festival in 2016, Hervey said this shift also affected her art: "Once I [went natural], everything started to change. I started feeling very comfortable in my skin and really confident about who I was. I started to look to a bunch of black artists who inspired me, that were kind of in my house. My mom had this Josephine Baker painting, and I always knew of her, but I didn't know much about her legacy and how much I was drawn to it. From there, I wanted to embellish it."

Hervey has also drawn notice in the fashion press on topics like her '70s-inflected taste, fashion shoots with her mother Williams and Williams's influence on Hervey's style, as well as Hervey's other fashion influences, like Naomi Campbell and Chaka Khan. In 2016, Vogue described one of Hervey's "signature outfits" as "a thigh-skimming, waist-whittling, flared minidress straight from G-Star's Spring 2016 collection with Kurt Geiger over-the-knee, platform velvet boots."
