= Cory McAbee =

American writer, director, and musician

Cory McAbee (born August 29, 1961, Santa Venetia, California, US) is an American writer, director, singer and songwriter.

== Biography ==
Cory McAbee was born in Northern California as the youngest of three children. His father was an auto mechanic and his mother was a preschool teacher. McAbee spent his summers living with his grandparents in the Nevada desert. McAbee's formal education ended with high school.

At the age of twenty, Cory McAbee learned how to write and perform music by forming a band. The band was never well received. It broke up after the first year.

For the next twelve years, McAbee worked as the head of security in bars and nightclubs throughout San Francisco. In 1989 he formed the musical group, The Billy Nayer Show. In 1990 McAbee completed his first animated short, Billy Nayer. The film premiered in its final form at the 1992 Sundance Film Festival.

Over the next couple of years, McAbee wrote and directed short films including The Ketchup and Mustard Man and The Man on the Moon. As a means of self-distribution, McAbee developed live musical performances that incorporated his short films. The show was called The Billy Nayer Chronicles. It was presented at the 1995 Sundance Film Festival as the festival's first multi-media event.

In 1996 McAbee wrote his first feature film, The American Astronaut. The screenplay was accepted to the 1998 Sundance screenwriters lab. The film premiered at the 2001 Sundance Film Festival.

In 2007 he wrote Stingray Sam with the intention of self-distribution on multiple platforms. Stingray Sam premiered at the 2009 Sundance Film Festival.

In 2011 The Billy Nayer Show released its final album and disbanded.

In 2012 McAbee released a non-budget experimental feature, Crazy and Thief, described by The New York Times as "a fitful sidewalk daydream."

In 2012 McAbee founded the international arts collaborative Captain Ahab's Motorcycle Club, with the goal of creating international solidarity between artists through the creation of a globally generated feature film, called Deep Astronomy. Beginning in 2012 and extending into 2017, McAbee performed concerts in support of this project throughout the US, Europe, and Australia. In 2015, McAbee recorded and produced his first solo album, Small Star Seminar, which become a catalyst for the film's narrative.

In 2017 McAbee developed a live performance entitled Deep Astronomy and the Romantic Sciences. The performances were created for the purpose of live entertainment and as events to be documented by collaborators for use in this feature film, and premiered at the 2018 Sundance Film Festival. Deep Astronomy was due to be completed in 2018 for festival release in 2019, but is now due in 2022.

== Filmography ==
Year	Title	Director	Writer	Composer	Actor	Role	Notes
1992	Billy Nayer	Yes	Yes	Yes	Yes	Man in a bar	
1993	The Man on the Moon	Yes	Yes	Yes	Yes	Dejected husband	
1994	The Ketchup and Mustard Man	Yes	Yes	Yes	Yes	The Ketchup and Mustard Man	
2001	The American Astronaut	Yes	Yes	Yes	Yes	Samuel Curtis	
2006	The Guatemalan Handshake				Yes	Spank Williams	
2006	Land of the Blind				Yes	Torturer / Mister Salty	
2008	The Onion Movie				Yes	Man in suit	
2009	It Came from Kuchar				Yes	himself	
2009	Stingray Sam	Yes	Yes	Yes	Yes	Stingray Sam	
2012	Crazy & Thief	Yes	Yes	Yes			Cinematographer
2012	Butterfly Stories				Yes	himself	
2019	Deep Astronomy	Yes	Yes	Yes	Yes	Cory McAbee	Filming / Post-production
2022	Deep Astronomy and the Romantic Sciences	Yes	Yes	Yes	Yes	Cory McAbee	Filming / Post-production
