= The Real Thing (Vanessa Williams album) =

Studio album by Vanessa Williams
- Released: May 27, 2009
- Studio: Capitol Studios (Hollywood, California); NRG Recording Studios (North Hollywood, California); Brandon's Way Recording (Los Angeles, California); G Studio Digital (Studio City, California); KAR Studio (Sherman Oaks, California); Willowbrooke Studios (Franklin, Tennessee); Legacy Recording Studios (New York City, New York); Peaceful Waters Music (Pound Ridge, New York)
- Genre: Pop; Latin; R&B
- Length: 48:15
- Label: Concord
- Producer: Keith Thomas; Babyface; Rob Mathes; Rex Rideout

Vanessa Williams chronology
Everlasting Love (2005)	The Real Thing (2009)	Survivor (2024)

Singles from The Real Thing
- 1. "Breathless" Released: February 24, 2009; 2. "Just Friends" Released: May 19, 2009; 3. "Close to You" Released: August 11, 2009; 4. "The Real Thing" Released: September 28, 2009

The Real Thing is the eighth studio album by American singer and actress Vanessa Williams. It was released by Concord Records on May 27, 2009. The album features productions by Keith Thomas, Kenneth "Babyface" Edmonds, Rob Mathes, and Rex Rideout. The Real Thing peaked at number 91 on the US Billboard 200. It also reached number one on the Top Contemporary Jazz Albums chart, number two on the Top Jazz Albums chart, and number 36 on the Top R&B/Hip-Hop Albums chart.

== Background and composition ==
The Real Thing was originally intended to be a "Brazilian-type" record. However, when Williams contacted Babyface for the album production, it was revealed the album would have a more R&B sound. She considered the album a combination of different influences, such as classical, jazz, and Latin music. The Real Thing was also produced by Keith Thomas, Rob Mathes and Rex Rideout, and features songs written by Stevie Wonder, Bill Withers, Bebel Gilberto, Phil Galdston, and Babyface. When asked about the album style, Williams said:

"Yes, for me this is kind of a reflective record. [...] You know, I'm in my mid-forties; I've been divorced twice; I've raised four children; I'm a career woman... So it is a kind of look at love from all those different female perspectives. [...] 'The Real Thing' represents the promise of being back with a lover; 'October Sky' is a break-up song… Plus, with me being an actor who's also a singer, my favourite songs to sing are always those that tell a story. Because, when I go into the studio, I do kind of approach everything as an actor. [...] So, in that way, I do think all the songs on 'The Real Thing' either have some deep storyline, or can give an effect of a character at a particular time in a particular place."

== Singles ==
- "Breathless" was released as the lead single from the album on February 24, 2009. It failed to chart, but Williams has stated that it is one of her favorite songs on the album.
- "Just Friends" was released as the second single on May 19, 2009. It reached #10 on the Billboard Jazz Songs chart.
- "Close to You" was released as the third worldwide single on August 11, 2009. The single also failed to chart.
- "The Real Thing" was released as the fourth single on September 28, 2009. It was written by Stevie Wonder and was released with a Soul Seekerz dance remix.

== Critical reception ==
Professional ratings
Review scores
Source	Rating
AllMusic	3/5 stars
Slant Magazine	1/5 stars

AllMusic editor Andy Kellman found that the album "carries a relaxed, serene feel, even when it is at its most active and spirited. The highlights tend to come with the Latin material [...] which Williams pulls off with natural ease. It's not likely to raise anyone's body temperature, but it's too welcoming to ignore." Slant Magazine's Jonathan Keefe described The Real Thing as "unfashionable, irrelevant material. With the moment for albums of pop standards from veteran artists like Rod Stewart, Michael McDonald, and Cyndi Lauper having passed, and with crooners like Michael Bublé and Norah Jones no longer selling as well as they once did, it's impossible to imagine that there’s a market for Real Thing."

== Chart performance ==
The Real Thing debuted and peaked at number 91 on the US Billboard 200. By May 2010, the album had sold 62,000 copies in United States.

== Track listing ==
The Real Thing track listing
No.	Title	Writer(s)	Producer(s)	Length
1.	"Breathless"	Lauren Evans; Phillip "Taj" Jackson; Rex Rideout	Rideout	4:50
2.	"Hello Like Before"	John Collins; Bill Withers	Keith Thomas	4:28
3.	"Loving You"	Carole Bayer Sager; Kenneth Edmonds	Babyface	3:33
4.	"Just Friends"	Edmonds	Babyface	3:27
5.	"The Real Thing"	Stevie Wonder	Rob Mathes; Ricky Gonzalez^{[a]}	5:12
6.	"Lazy Afternoon"	John Latouche; Jerome Moross	Rideout	4:56
7.	"Close to You"	Bebel Gilberto; Guy Sigsworth	Mathes; Gonzalez^{[a]}	4:36
8.	"I Fell In"	Shelea Frazier; Galdston	Thomas	4:47
9.	"October Sky" (featuring Javier Colon)	Colon; Evan Rogers; Carl Sturken	Thomas	4:28
10.	"Come On Strong"	Sammy Cahn; Jimmy Van Heusen	Thomas	2:39
11.	"If There Were No Song"	Stephanie Lewis; Rob Mathes	Mathes; Gonzalez^{[a]}	4:29
12.	"Let’s Make the Most of a Beautiful Thing" (Japan Bonus Track)	Mike Corda; Jacques Wilson	Keith Thomas	4:09

Notes

- ^{^[a]} signifies associate producer(s)

== Personnel ==
- Vanessa Williams – vocals, backing vocals (1, 6–8)
- Rex Rideout – keyboards (1, 6), programming (1, 6), arrangements (6)
- Keith Thomas – acoustic piano (2, 8, 9), Rhodes electric piano (2), programming (2, 8, 9), arrangements (2, 8, 9)
- Babyface – keyboards (4), drum programming (4), backing vocals (4)
- Greg Phillinganes – acoustic piano (4)
- Ricky Gonzalez – acoustic piano (5, 11), keyboards (5, 7, 11), programming (5, 7, 11)
- Rob Mathes – Rhodes electric piano (5, 7, 11), acoustic guitar (5, 7), arrangements and conductor (5, 7, 11), acoustic piano (7, 11)
- Michael Lang – Rhodes electric piano (6), acoustic piano (10)
- Dean Parks – electric guitar, acoustic guitar (1, 6), classical guitar (2, 8)
- Michael Ripoll – additional acoustic guitar (1, 6), guitars (3, 4), acoustic guitar solo (6)
- Agape Jerry – guitars (3)
- Jonathan Crone – electric guitar (9)
- Abraham Laboriel – bass (1, 2, 6, 8)
- Ethan Farmer – bass (3)
- Reggie Hamilton – bass (4)
- Carlos Henriquez – bass (5, 11), acoustic bass (7), electric bass (7)
- Craig Nelson – bass (9)
- Dave Carpenter – bass (10)
- Abe Laboriel Jr. – drums (1, 2, 6, 8)
- Derrek Phillips – drums (9)
- Gregg Field – drums (10)
- Michael White – percussion (1, 6)
- Eric Darken – percussion (2, 8, 9)
- Luisito Quintero – percussion (5, 7, 11)
- Dan Higgins – alto saxophone (10)
- Joel Peskin – baritone saxophone (10)
- Pete Christlieb – tenor saxophone (10)
- Ozzie Melendez – trombone (5), horn and rhythm contractor (5)
- Alan Kaplan – trombone (10)
- Mike Haynes – trumpet solo (2)
- Raul Agraz – trumpet (5)
- Rick Baptist – trumpet (10)
- Gary Grant – trumpet (10)
- The Movement Orchestra Horns (3)
  - Miguel Gandelman – saxophones
  - Garrett Smith – trombone
  - Ray Monteiro – trumpet
- Richard Locker – cello (7)
- Vincent Lionti – viola (7)
- Elena Barere – violin (7)
- Katherine Livolsi-Stern – violin (7)
- Rob Lewis – horn arrangements (3)
- Darrell Crooks – co-arrangements (6)
- Jill Dell'Abate – string contractor (7)
- Tom Scott – track and horn arrangements (10)
- Lauren Evans – backing vocals (1)
- Kimberly Brewer – backing vocals (6)
- Javier Colon – vocals (9)

String Section (Tracks 1, 2, 6 & 8–10)

- Nick Lane – arrangements and conductor (1, 6)
- Jorge Calandrelli – arrangements and conductor (2, 8, 9), conductor (10)
- Tom Scott – arrangements (10)
- Brian Benson, Junko Tamura and Peter Tomasheck – music preparation arrangements (2, 8, 9)
- Joe Soldo – contractor
- Bruce Dukov – concertmaster

String Players

- Steve Erdody, Armen Ksajikian, Trevor Handy and Christina Soule – cello
- Gayle Levant – harp
- Brian Dembow, Roland Kato, Vicki Miskolczy, Irina Voloshina and David Walther – viola
- Rebecca Bunnell, Darius Campo, Roberto Cani, Bruce Dukov, Raymond Kobler, Johana Krejci, Natalie Leggett, Phillip Levy, Robin Olson, Alyssa Park, Katia Popov, Anatoly Rosinsky, and Margaret Wooten – violin

== Production ==
- John Burk – executive producer
- Jill Dell'Abate – production coordinator (5, 11)
- Daryl Bush – production manager (8, 9)
- Jonathan Crone – production manager (8, 9)
- Mary Hogan – A&R administration
- Abbey Anna – art direction
- Michael Gassel – package design
- Gilles Toucas – photography
- Chuck Amos – hair stylist
- Sam Fine – make-up
- Money Management Group – management

Technical

- Mick Guzauski – mixing at Barking Doctor Recording (Mount Kisco, New York)
- Robert Friedrich – mastering at Telaric International (Cleveland, Ohio)
- Nathaniel Kunkel – recording (1, 2, 8–10)
- Seth Presant – recording (1, 2, 6, 10)
- Rex Rideout – recording (1, 6)
- Bill Smith – string recording (1, 2, 6, 8–10), horn recording
- Paul Smith – Pro Tools string recording (1, 6, 8, 10)
- Paul Boutin – recording (3, 4)
- Alex Venguer – recording (5, 7, 11)
- Wayne Warnecke – recording (5, 7, 11)
- Bill Whittington – recording (9)
- Tom Bender – assistant engineer
- Bruce Monical – assistant engineer (1, 2, 6, 8–10)
- Jonathan Crone – assistant engineer (2, 8, 10), recording (9)
- Casey Lewis – assistant engineer (2, 8, 10)
- Don Goodrick – assistant engineer (5, 7, 11)

== Charts ==
=== Weekly charts ===
Weekly chart performance for The Real Thing
Chart (2009)	Peak position
US Billboard 200	91
US Top Contemporary Jazz Albums (Billboard)	1
US Top Jazz Albums (Billboard)	2
US Top R&B/Hip-Hop Albums (Billboard)	36

=== Year-end charts ===
Year-end chart performance for The Real Thing
Chart (2009)	Position
US Top Contemporary Jazz Albums (Billboard)	5
US Top Jazz Albums (Billboard)	22

== Release history ==
Release history for The Real Thing
Region	Date	Label	Ref.
Japan	May 27, 2009	Universal	
Canada	June 2, 2009	Universal	
United States	June 2, 2009	Concord	
Germany	June 12, 2009	Universal	
