= Billy Nayer Show =

Billy Nayer Show is a New York based musical group of questionable genre. The band consists of lead singer and songwriter Cory McAbee, drummer Bobby Lurie and bassist Frank Howard Swart .

== Discography ==
- Meet the Bunny King (1990)
- Married to the Sea (1993)
- The Billy Nayer Show (1994)
- Must Be Santa (1995)
- The Ketchup & Mustard Man (1995)
- The Villain That Love Built (1998)
- Return to Brigadoon (1999)
- The American Astronaut Soundtrack (2002)
- Goodbye Straplight Sarentino, I Will Miss You (2003)
- Rabbit (2004)
- BNS Presents The Billy Nayer Show (2010)

== Films ==
=== Billy Nayer (1993) ===
This short film is a scene from a bar, with a man being asked to sing a quick song by his sweetheart. Approximately 2 minutes.

=== The Man On The Moon (1994) ===
This piece recounts an entire year of a man's life who has exiled himself to the moon and sends transmissions back to earth. Approximately 20 minutes.

=== The Ketchup & Mustard Man (1995) ===
This work has no real plot, it is more a loose collection of songs and jokes. Approximately 25 minutes.

=== The American Astronaut (2001) ===
The first full-length motion picture written, starring and directed by Cory McAbee. The Billy Nayer Show has writing or performance credits for most, if not all, of the music in the movie.

=== The Billy Nayer Show: The Early Years (2003) ===
Includes the above-mentioned "Billy Nayer", "The Man On The Moon" and "The Ketchup and Mustard Man". Also includes rarities, "Must be Santa" and "The Explanation" and some live footage.

=== Stingray Sam (2009) ===
Stingray Sam is a six-episode musical-western mini-series that takes place in outer space. A dangerous mission reunites Stingray Sam with his long lost accomplice, The Quasar Kid. The story follows the two space convicts as they earn their freedom in exchange for the rescue of a young girl who is being held captive by the genetically designed figurehead of a very wealthy planet. Running time 61 minutes. All members of the Billy Nayer Show have a (shorter or longer) role in the movie.
