= Color Me Badd discography =

Discography of American R&B group Color Me Badd

The following is the discography of American R&B group Color Me Badd.

== Albums ==
=== Studio albums ===
Year	Details	Peak chart positions										Certifications
Year	Details	US	US R&B	AUS	AUT	CAN	GER	NLD	NZ	SWE	UK	Certifications
1991	C.M.B.: Release date: July 23, 1991; Label: Giant	3	10	17	32	6	23	9	15	30	3	RIAA: 5× Platinum; ARIA: Gold; BPI: Gold; MC: 2× Platinum
1993	Time and Chance: Release date: November 16, 1993; Label: Giant	56	20	110	—	—	—	—	—	—	—	RIAA: Gold
1996	Now & Forever: Release date: May 14, 1996; Label: Giant	113	39	139	—	—	—	—	—	—	—	_ =
1998	Awakening: Release date: July 28, 1998; Label: Epic	110	—	—	—	—	—	—	—	—	—	
"—" denotes a recording that did not chart or was not released in that territory.

=== Compilation albums ===
Year	Details
2000	The Best of Color Me Badd: Released: August 22, 2000; Label: Giant

=== Remix albums ===
Year	Details	Peak position	
Year	Details	US	AUS
1992	Young, Gifted & Badd: The Remixes: Released: November 24, 1992; Label: Giant	189	126

== Singles ==
Year	Title	Peak chart positions										Certifications	Album
Year	Title	US	US R&B	AUS	AUT	CAN	GER	NLD	NZ	SWE	UK	Certifications	Album
1991	"I Wanna Sex You Up"	2	1	4	11	18	4	2	1	5	1	RIAA: 2× Platinum; ARIA: Gold; BPI: Silver	New Jack City (soundtrack); C.M.B.
1991	"I Adore Mi Amor"	1	1	27	—	8	44	11	8	—	44	RIAA: Gold	C.M.B.
1991	"All 4 Love"	1	—	9	—	8	23	3	1	25	5	RIAA: Gold; ARIA: Gold	C.M.B.
1991	"Color Me Badd"	—	56	—	—	—	—	—	—	—	—		C.M.B.
1992	"Thinkin' Back"	16	31	—	—	35	—	—	—	—	—		C.M.B.
1992	"Heartbreaker"	—	—	101	—	—	—	61	32	—	58		C.M.B.
1992	"Slow Motion"	18	—	—	—	40	—	—	—	—	—		C.M.B.
1992	"Forever Love"	15	—	91	—	41	—	—	—	—	—		Mo' Money (soundtrack); Young, Gifted & Badd: The Remixes
1993	"Time and Chance"	23	9	170	—	58	—	—	—	—	62		Time and Chance
1994	"Choose"	23	—	56	—	31	—	—	45	—	65		Time and Chance
1994	"In the Sunshine"	—	—	—	—	—	—	—	—	—	—		Time and Chance
1994	"The Bells"	—	73	—	—	—	—	—	—	—	—		Time and Chance
1994	"Let's Start with Forever"	— (Note: "Let's Start with Forever" did not enter the Billboard Hot 100, but peaked at number 15 on the Bubbling Under Hot 100 chart.)	—	—	—	—	—	—	—	—	—		Time and Chance
1996	"The Earth, the Sun, the Rain"	21	69	—	—	12	69	—	30	—	—		Now & Forever
1996	"Sexual Capacity"	— (Note: "Sexual Capacity" did not enter the Billboard Hot 100, but peaked at number 21 on the Bubbling Under Hot 100 chart.)	—	—	—	—	—	—	—	—	—		Now & Forever
1998	"Remember When"	48	—	—	—	—	—	—	—	—	—		Awakening
2022	"California Dreamin"	—	—	—	—	—	—	—	—	—	—		
"—" denotes a recording that did not chart or was not released in that territory.
