= American Music Awards of 1992 =

US television program

19th Annual American Music Awards
- Date: January 27, 1992
- Location: Shrine Auditorium, Los Angeles, California
- Country: United States
- Hosted by: MC Hammer
- Most awards: C+C Music Factory (5)
- Most nominations: C+C Music Factory (6)

Television/radio coverage
- Network: ABC
- Runtime: 180 min.
- Produced by: Dick Clark Productions

The 19th Annual American Music Awards were held on January 27, 1992, at the Shrine Auditorium, in Los Angeles, California. The awards recognized the most popular artists and albums from the year 1991.

C+C Music Factory were the most nominated and the big winners of the night, winning five out of the 6 trophies they were up to. Pop star Michael Bolton, soul's Luther Vandross and Natalie Cole each garnered two awards.

== Performances ==
Artist(s)	Song(s)
MC Hammer	"Do Not Pass Me By"
Color Me Badd	Medley: "I Adore Mi Amor" "I Wanna Sex You Up" "All 4 Love"
Reba McEntire	"The Night the Lights Went Out in Georgia"
Guns N' Roses	"Yesterdays"^{[a]}
Whitney Houston	Medley: "I'm Your Baby Tonight" "My Name Is Not Susan" "Who Do You Love"
Celine Dion; Peabo Bryson	"Beauty and the Beast"
Wynonna Judd	"She Is His Only Need"
James Brown	Medley: "Please, Please, Please" "Papa's Got a Brand New Bag" "Sex Machine" "It's Time To Love" "Out of Sight"
Boyz II Men	"It's So Hard to Say Goodbye to Yesterday"
Travis Tritt	"Anymore"
MC Hammer	"2 Legit 2 Quit" "Pump It Up"

Notes

- ^{^[a]} Pre-taped in Las Vegas, Nevada.

== Winners and nominees ==
Subcategory	Winner	Nominees
Pop/Rock Category
Favorite Pop/Rock Male Artist	Michael Bolton	Bryan Adams; Rod Stewart
Favorite Pop/Rock Female Artist	Paula Abdul	Mariah Carey; Whitney Houston
Favorite Pop/Rock Band/Duo/Group	C+C Music Factory	Color Me Badd; Guns N' Roses
Favorite Pop/Rock Album	Time, Love & Tenderness – Michael Bolton	Gonna Make You Sweat – C+C Music Factory; Unforgettable... with Love – Natalie Cole; Out of Time – R.E.M.
Favorite Pop/Rock Song	"(Everything I Do) I Do It for You" – Bryan Adams	"I Wanna Sex You Up" – Color Me Badd "More Than Words" – Extreme
Favorite Pop/Rock New Artist	C+C Music Factory	Boyz II Men; Color Me Badd
Soul/R&B Category
Favorite Soul/R&B Male Artist	Luther Vandross	LL Cool J Prince
Favorite Soul/R&B Female Artist	Mariah Carey	Natalie Cole; Whitney Houston
Favorite Soul/R&B Band/Duo/Group	Bell Biv DeVoe	Boyz II Men; DJ Jazzy Jeff & The Fresh Prince
Favorite Soul/R&B Album	Power of Love – Luther Vandross	Cooleyhighharmony – Boyz II Men; I'm Your Baby Tonight – Whitney Houston; New Jack City – soundtrack
Favorite Soul/R&B Song	"I Wanna Sex You Up" – Color Me Badd	"I Adore Mi Amor" – Color Me Badd "Motownphilly" – Boyz II Men
Favorite Soul/R&B New Artist	Boyz II Men	Color Me Badd; Hi-Five
Country Category
Favorite Country Male Artist	Garth Brooks	Clint Black; Ricky Van Shelton
Favorite Country Female Artist	Reba McEntire	Kathy Mattea; Dolly Parton
Favorite Country Band/Duo/Group	Alabama	The Judds; Kentucky Headhunters
Favorite Country Album	No Fences – Garth Brooks	Put Yourself in My Shoes – Clint Black; Ropin' the Wind – Garth Brooks; Don't Rock the Jukebox – Alan Jackson; Rumor Has It – Reba McEntire; It's All About to Change – Travis Tritt
Favorite Country Song	"The Thunder Rolls" – Garth Brooks	"Here's a Quarter (Call Someone Who Cares)" – Travis Tritt "She's in Love with the Boy" – Trisha Yearwood
Favorite Country New Artist	Trisha Yearwood	Billy Dean; Pam Tillis
Adult Contemporary Category
Favorite Adult Contemporary Artist	Natalie Cole	Paula Abdul; Whitney Houston
Favorite Adult Contemporary Album	Unforgettable... with Love – Natalie Cole	Spellbound – Paula Abdul; I'm Your Baby Tonight – Whitney Houston
Favorite Adult Contemporary New Artist	Michael W. Smith	Marc Cohn; The Triplets
Dance Category
Favorite Dance Artist	C+C Music Factory	Madonna; Crystal Waters
Favorite Dance Song	"Gonna Make You Sweat (Everybody Dance Now)" – C+C Music Factory	"Gypsy Woman (She's Homeless)" – Crystal Waters "Someday" – Mariah Carey
Favorite Dance New Artist	C+C Music Factory	The KLF; Crystal Waters
Heavy Metal/Hard Rock Category
Favorite Heavy Metal/Hard Rock Artist	Guns N' Roses	Metallica; Van Halen
Favorite Heavy Metal/Hard Rock Album	For Unlawful Carnal Knowledge – Van Halen	Use Your Illusion I – Guns N' Roses; Metallica – Metallica
Favorite Heavy Metal/Hard Rock New Artist	Firehouse	Alice in Chains; Nirvana
Rap/Hip-Hop Category
Favorite Rap/Hip-Hop Artist	MC Hammer	DJ Jazzy Jeff & the Fresh Prince; N.W.A.
Favorite Rap/Hip-Hop Album	Homebase – DJ Jazzy Jeff & the Fresh Prince	Mama Said Knock You Out – LL Cool J Apocalypse 91... The Enemy Strikes Black – Public Enemy
Favorite Rap/Hip-Hop New Artist	Naughty by Nature	DJ Quik; Marky Mark and the Funky Bunch
Merit
James Brown
