= Young, Gifted & Badd: The Remixes =

Young, Gifted, & Badd: The Remixes

Remix album by Color Me Badd
- Released: November 24, 1992
- Length: 44:06
- Label: Giant; Reprise
- Producer: Color Me Badd; Nick Mundy; Royal Bayyan; Dr. Freeze; Michael Fossenkemper

Color Me Badd chronology
C.M.B. (1991)	Young, Gifted, & Badd: The Remixes (1992)	Time and Chance (1993)

Professional ratings
Review scores
Source	Rating
AllMusic	2/5 stars

Young, Gifted, & Badd: The Remixes is the first remix album by American group Color Me Badd. It also featured another hit single "Forever Love" (U.S. number 15), featured on the Mo' Money soundtrack.

== Track listing ==
1. "Color Me Badd [Mark Murray Remix]" (Straite, Elliot) - 5:03
2. "I Wanna Sex You Up [Howie Tee Remix]" (Wright, Betty/Straite, Elliot/Clarke, Willie) - 4:23
3. "Forever Love" (Color Me Badd/Lewis, Terry/Harris, James Producer) - 5:12
4. "Slow Motion [Howie Tee Remix]" (Color Me Badd/Thompson, Howard) - 4:35
5. "Thinkin' Back [D.C. Go Mix]" (Color Me Badd/Taylor, Troy/Lee, Hamza) - 5:28
6. "Your da One I Onena Love [T-Bone & Mr. Woody Remix]" (Color Me Badd/Thompson, Howard) - 4:09
7. "I Adore Mi Amor [Prelude]" - :57
8. "I Adore Mi Amor [Hamza's Mix]" (Color Me Badd/Lee, Hamza) - 5:17
9. "Roll the Dice [Nick Mundy Remix]" (Mundy, Nick/Gomez, Gina) - 5:08
10. "All 4 Love [Howie Tee Remix]" (Color Me Badd/Cropper, Steve/Hayes, Isaac/Thompson, Howard) - 4:19
11. "C.M.B. [Postlude]" (Color Me Badd/Murray, Mark) - :55

== Singles ==
- Forever Love - September 24, 1992
