= It's Done =

Studio album by Overground
- Released: November 17, 2003
- Length: 43:33
- Label: Cheyenne; Polydor; Zeitgeist
- Producer: Triple-M

Overground chronology
It's Done (2003)	2. OG; (2004)

It's Done is the debut studio album by German boy band Overground, formed through the ProSieben television series Popstars – Das Duell, the third season of the reality talent contest Popstars in late 2003. Chiefly produced by Mike Michaels, MM Dollar, and Sammy Naja from production team Triple-M, it reached number one in Germany and Switzerland.

== Critical reception ==
Professional ratings
Review scores
Source	Rating
laut.de	1/5 stars

Michael Schuh from laut.de rated the album one out of five stars. He found that "instead of convincing all the critics who felt that after Bro'Sis the Popstars concept had finally worn out, Overground only deliver rancid boy band fare that – surprise – despite the bilingual approach, is simply a Bro'Sis copy."

== Chart performance ==
It's Done debuted at number one on the German Albums Chart in the week of 1 December 2003. It would remain two further weeks inside the top ten and was eventually certified Platinum by the Bundesverband Musikindustrie (BVMI) for shipments figures in excess of 200,000 units. In Switzerland, the album debuted at number 13 on the Swiss Albums Chart and eventually reached number one in its second week of release. In Austra, It's Done debuted and peaked at number 13 on the Austrian Albums Chart.

== Track listing ==
It's Done track listing
No.	Title	Writer(s)	Producer(s)	Length
1.	"One for da Money"	Mike Michaels; MM Dollar; Sammy Naja; O.K.A.N.; TK-Roxx	Michaels; Dollar; Naja	3:45
2.	"Schick mir 'nen Engel"	Michaels; Dollar; Mark Tabak; Naja; O.K.A.N.; Deema; TK-Roxx	Michaels; Dollar; Naja	3:42
3.	"Gib mir deine Nähe"	Michaels; Dollar; Naja; O.K.A.N.; Senad Behljuljevic; TK-Roxx	Michaels; Dollar; Naja	3:25
4.	"Blätter"	Michaels; Dollar; Tabak; Deema	Michaels; Dollar; Tabak	3:36
5.	"I Wanna Sex You Up"	Sam Watters; Betty Wright; Mark Calderon; Kevin Thornton; Bryan Abrams; Elliot T. Straite	Michaels; Dollar; Naja	3:24
6.	"Heut' Nacht"	Michaels; Dollar; Tabak; Deema	Michaels; Dollar; Naja	4:19
7.	"Tanz' mit mir"	Michaels; Dollar; Naja; O.K.A.N.; Behljuljevic	Michaels; Dollar; Naja	3:48
8.	"Solang' ich am Leben bin"	A&R Chartbreaker; Rayman	Michaels; Dollar; Naja	4:04
9.	"Nur du"	Michaels; Dollar; Naja; O.K.A.N.; TK-Roxx	Michaels; Dollar; Naja	3:09
10.	"Hello?!"	Michaels; Dollar; Naja; O.K.A.N.; Behljuljevic; TK-Roxx	Michaels; Dollar; Naja	3:33
11.	"Sieben Tage"	Michaels; Dollar; Naja; O.K.A.N.; Deema; TK-Roxx	Michaels; Dollar; Naja	3:20
12.	"Wie viele Male"	Mihalj Kekenj; Ramsi Aliani	Michaels; Dollar; Naja	3:22
Total length:				43:33

== Charts ==
=== Weekly charts ===
Weekly chart performance for It's Done
Chart (2003)	Peak position
Austrian Albums (Ö3 Austria)	13
German Albums (Offizielle Top 100)	1
Swiss Albums (Schweizer Hitparade)	1

=== Year-end charts ===
Year-end chart performance for It's Done
Chart (2003)	Position
German Albums (Offizielle Top 100)	72
Swiss Albums (Schweizer Hitparade)	58

== Certifications and sales ==
Certifications for It's Done
Region	Certification	Certified units/sales
Germany (BVMI)	Platinum	200,000^{^}
^{^} Shipments figures based on certification alone.
