= Thinkin' Back =

1992 single by Color Me Badd

Single by Color Me Badd

from the album C.M.B.
- Released: January 22, 1992
- Recorded: 1991
- Genre: Contemporary R&B; pop
- Length: 5:21
- Label: Giant; Reprise
- Songwriters: Bryan Abrams; Mark Calderon; Troy Taylor Lee; Kevin Thornton; Sam Watters
- Producers: Royal Bayyan; Hamza Lee

Color Me Badd singles chronology
"All 4 Love" (1991)	"Thinkin' Back" (1992)	"Slow Motion" (1992)

"Thinkin' Back" is an R&B and pop song by American music group Color Me Badd from their debut album, C.M.B. (1991). It was released as the fifth single (fourth in North America) in January 1992. The song is about a deteriorating relationship, and while the protagonist's partner did them wrong, they are still lonely, and want to turn back time to go back to when their relationship was in a good place.

On the Billboard Hot 100 in the United States, the song reached number 16 on April 4, 1992, and lasted 20 weeks on the chart. It peaked at number 31 on the Hot R&B Singles chart during 9-week run on the chart, and number 35 in Canada.

== Music video ==
The music video was directed by Marcus Nispel, and was filmed/produced by Portfolio Artists Network. It was shot in black and white, and was edited to coincide with the conceptual theme in the video regarding the passage of time, as each edit aligned with the beats of the music. It received strong recurring play and support on MTV, and to a lesser extent BET, which helped the performance of the song.

== Critical reception ==
Larry Flick from Billboard wrote, "Those Badd boys show no sign of cooling off, thanks to this lush, R&B-powered ballad. Spotlight is on group's tightly woven harmonies and song's romantic lyrics. Another multiformat hit from the "C.M.B." album."

== Track listings ==
- US vinyl, 12", promo
- A1 Thinkin' Back (Radio Edit) 3:49
- A2 Thinkin' Back (XXX Version) 4:39
- B1 Thinkin' Back (Album Version) 5:22
- B2 Thinkin' Back (A Cappella) 5:22
- US vinyl, 7"
- 1 Thinkin' Back (Album Version) 5:23
- 2 Thinkin' Back (XXX Version) 4:39
- US CD, single, promo
- 1 Thinkin' Back (Radio Edit) 3:49
- 2 Thinkin' Back (XXX Version) 4:39
- 3 Thinkin' Back (More Radio Edit) 3:44
- US CD, single, promo
- 1 Thinkin' Back (Edited Master) 3:56
- 2 Thinkin' Back (A Cappella) 4:08
- 3 Thinkin' Back (Album Version) 5:26
- 4 Thinkin' Back (Pop Mix With Piano) 6:54
- US cassette, single
- A Thinkin' Back (Album Version) 5:22
- B Thinkin' Back (XXX Version) 4:39

== Personnel ==
- Producer – Hamza Lee, Royal Bayyan
- Written by Color Me Badd, Hamza Lee, Troy Taylor (9)(10)

== Charts ==
=== Weekly charts ===
Chart (1992)	Peak position
Canada Top Singles (RPM)	35
US Billboard Hot 100	16
US Hot R&B/Hip-Hop Songs (Billboard)	31
US Cash Box Top 100	7

=== Year-end charts ===
Chart (1992)	Position
US Billboard Hot 100	89
