= Overground (band) =

German boy band

- Origin: Germany
- Genres: Pop; R&B
- Years active: 2003–2008
- Labels: Cheyenne; Velvet M-Pire
- Members: Ahmet "Akay" Kayed; Ken Miyao; Marq Porciuncula; Meiko Reißmann
- Past members: Fabrizio Levita

Overground was a boy band from Germany. The original group comprised singers Akay Kayed, Ken Miyao, Marq Porciuncula and Meiko Reißmann. Created through the ProSieben talent show Popstars – Das Duell (2003) in which pop groups of both genders competed against each other, Overground won over girl band Preluders in a public vote. Their debut single "Schick mir 'nen Engel" became a number-one hit in Austria, Germany and Switzerland, while parent album It's Done (2003) reached the top spot in Germany and Switzerland and was eventually certified platinum by the Bundesverband Musikindustrie (BVMI).

In 2004, Overground competed in the national final with "Der letzte Stern" for a chance to represent Germany at the Eurovision Song Contest 2004. In fall, they released their second album 2. OG which underperformed on the charts, leading to their departure from Cheyenne Records. Their final single "Hass mich" was released on Velvet M-Pire Records in October 2005. After a relatively unsuccessful period, the quartet disbanded in 2008.

== History ==
=== Formation ===
Overground were formed in September 2003 in front of millions of viewers on the ProSieben programme Popstars – Das Duell ("The Duel"). The concept of the programme was to form a boy group and a girl group who would be rivals and compete for winning the third installment of the reality television program. Following the success of No Angels and Bro'Sis, 12,000 applicants attended auditions in five German megacities in hopes of being selected for the show. Judged by rapper Sabrina Setlur, choreographer Detlef "D!" Soost and producer Uwe Fahrenkrog-Petersen, 27 out of 46 contestants made it from the local recall shows to Orlando, Florida to get trained in singing, dancing and fitness.

The judges continued eliminating two or three boys and girls each week, until a small group of finalists remained. In the end the four boys Ahmet "Akay" Kayed, Ken Miyao, Marq Porciuncula and Meiko Reißmann were chosen to form the group Overground.

While the show continued tracking the development and struggles of the new boy group and the final four members of the similarly formed girl group Preluders, the judges decided to add a fifth member to both groups after failed recording sessions. Selecting from the semi-finalists, they chose Italian Fabrizio to 'complete' Overground.

Their promotional debut single was a remake of Color Me Badd's 1991 hit I Wanna Sex You Up. After three weeks of touring and promotional appearances across Germany, the season's finale was held on Wednesday, 3 November 2003, where the boys polled enough votes to win "the duel" against the girl group Preluders.

=== Career ===
After weeks of recording Overground released their debut single, German-sung Schick mir 'nen Engel on 10 November 2003. Produced by Triple M, the song entered the charts at number one on the German, Austrian and Swiss singles charts and became one of the most successful (German-speaking) songs of 2003. Their debut album It's Done saw similar success, eventually receiving two platinum certifications.

In 2004, the group followed-up with Der letzte Stern and Aus und vorbei, two further top-10 single releases. They also began recording their second album 2. OG, which spawned a collaboration with Montell Jordan and a remake of his 1995 hit This Is How We Do It. Both, the single and the album, failed to continue from the previous chart successes and the group was released from its label Cheyenne Records, which reserved the possibility to release another single.

After a longer absence the group returned in autumn of 2005 with their fifth single Hass mich.

After disbanding, Ken Miyao released a single Talk 2 Me with American rapper Fatman Scoop. This was regarded as a commercial failure, peaking at only #89 of the German charts.

== Discography ==
=== Studio albums ===
| Title | Album details | Peak chart positions | | | Sales | Certifications |
| Title | Album details | GER | AUT | SWI | Sales | Certifications |
|---|---|---|---|---|---|---|
| It's Done | Released: 17 November 2003; Label: Cheyenne, Polydor, Zeitgeist; Formats: CD, digital download | 1 | 13 | 1 | GER: 200,000 | BVMI: Platinum |
| 2. OG | Released: 8 November 2004; Label: Cheyenne, Polydor, Zeitgeist; Formats: CD, digital download | 41 | – | – | | |

=== Singles ===
| Title | Year | Peak positions | | | Sales | Certifications | Album |
| Title | Year | GER | AUT | SWI | Sales | Certifications | Album |
|---|---|---|---|---|---|---|---|
| "I Wanna Sex You Up" | 2003 | — | — | — | EU: 400,000 | | It's Done |
| "Schick mir 'nen Engel" | 2003 | 1 | 1 | 1 | GER: 150,000 | BVMI: Gold | It's Done |
| "Der letzte Stern" | 2004 | 9 | 30 | 27 | | | Non-album release |
| "Aus und vorbei" | 2004 | 10 | 39 | — | | | 2. OG |
| "This Is How We Do It" | 2004 | 19 | 53 | — | | | 2. OG |
| "Hass mich" | 2005 | 35 | — | — | | | Non-album release |
"—" denotes a recording that did not chart or was not released in that territory.

As featured artist

| Title | Year | Peak positions | | | Sales | Certifications | Album |
| Title | Year | GER | AUT | SWI | Sales | Certifications | Album |
|---|---|---|---|---|---|---|---|
| "Do They Know It's Christmas?" (with TV All Stars) | 2003 | 3 | 28 | 32 | GER: 150,000 | BVMI: Gold | Ultimate Christmas Album |
"—" denotes a recording that did not chart or was not released in that territory.

== Awards ==
=== 2003 ===
- Bravo Otto (Gold) – "Best Newcomer Band"

=== 2004 ===
- Bravo Otto (Silver) – "Best Band National"
- Goldene Stimmgabel – "Shooting Star 2004"
- Goldener Pinguin – "Best Newcomer 2004"
