= Comfort zone (disambiguation) =

Comfort zone is a behavioural state within which a person operates in an anxiety-neutral condition.

Comfort zone or Comfort Zone may also refer to:

== Zones ==
- Thermal comfort, a term used in association with comfort zones in building construction
- Circumstellar habitable zone, the region in a star system where an Earth-like planet can maintain liquid water on its surface

== Books ==
- Comfort Zone, a novel by Brian W. Aldiss
- The Comfort Zone, a novel by Jeremy Sheldon

== Music ==
- Comfort Zone, a 1980 album by Steven Halpern
- Comfort Zone (album), a 1999 album by Sector Seven
- The Comfort Zone (album), a 1991 album by Vanessa L. Williams
- "The Comfort Zone" (song), a 1991 Vanessa Williams single from the album
- "Comfort Zone" by the Answer from Everyday Demons
- ComfortZone, a 2014 mixtape by Saba

== Places ==
- The Comfort Zone (nightclub), a Toronto, Canada dance club venue

== See also ==
- Goldilocks principle
