= Time and Chance (song) =

Single by Color Me Badd

from the album Time and Chance
- Released: October 23, 1993
- Recorded: 1993
- Genre: R&B; funk; hip hop
- Length: 4:23
- Label: Giant; Reprise
- Songwriters: Bryan Abrams; Mark Calderon; DJ Pooh; Kevin Thornton; Sam Watters
- Producer: DJ Pooh

Color Me Badd singles chronology
"Forever Love" (1992)	"Time and Chance" (1993)	"Choose" (1994)

"Time and Chance" is a contemporary R&B, funk, and hip hop song performed by American group Color Me Badd and the lead single and title track from their second album (1993). It was released in October 1993, by Giant and Reprise Records. The song is about how life is about time and chance, with it determining whether good or bad people thrive, or falter in life, and how everyone deals with their own hurt and pain. It was meant to introduce the group to a new "street" audience as hip hop and gangsta rap were becoming more popular.

The song peaked at No. 23 on the US Billboard Hot 100 on December 11, 1993, and spent 19 weeks on the chart. It also reached No. 23 on the Cash Box Top 100 and No. 9 on the Billboard R&B singles chart. The song was their final top-ten R&B hit and the video was played extensively on BET, which helped the performance of the single. The video peaked at No. 1 on BET for the week of November 28, 1993.

== Critical reception ==
Larry Flick from Billboard magazine commented, "One of the originators of the doo-hop movement returns with wildly infectious pop/hip-hop number that weaves deeply soulful vocals into a smoldering, sexy groove. Watch for producer DJ Pooh to become the red-hot studio entity of 1994; he has crafted a hip but accessible musical foundation that showcases CMB perfectly. First taste of act's new album of the same name should do wonders in establishing a comfy niche at top 40 for a long time to come. Single of the week."

Alex Kadis from Smash Hits gave the song a score of three out of five, writing, "It's quite good — a spare and simple harmonised funk-a-long ballad that Prince ought to listen to.".

Troy J. Augusto from "Cash Box" commented, "Soulful, young, hip-hop outfit returns with this smoldering, sensual number that's sure to light up top 40 request lines. Kudos to track producer D.J. Pooh, whose smart touch gives 'Time & Chance," the title cut from the group's soon-to-be-issued new album, a warm, quite accessible vibe. Understated vocal delivery, lilting guitar stings and bluesy atmosphere all point this one towards chart heaven,a place that this group should get used to visiting.".

Dave Sholin from "Gavin Picks" reviewed the song, "Only a handful of groups have made a debut as spectacular as this quartet did. Adding more of a street feel to their sound, CMB proves their success is long-term with this totally hot follow-up."

== Music video ==
The accompanying music video for "Time and Chance" was directed by Ice Cube, who was recruited by the executives and A&R in Giant Records, in order to give the group more street credibility. The video opens with narration by actor Ossie Davis, as the guys are driving around Los Angeles filming footage for a video, their camcorder gets stolen, and two female LAPD officers rough them up and frame them for drug possession. Sam is driving them around in a black Jeep.

== Track listings ==
- US vinyl, 12, promo"

A1. "Time and Chance" (Funk On A Skunk Mix) – 5:22
A2. "Time and Chance" (Straight Up Mix) – 4:03
B1. "Time and Chance" (Allstar's Six Feet Deep Mix) – 4:33
B2. "Time and Chance" (Album Mix) – 4:20

- US vinyl, 7"

A. "Time and Chance" (Album Version) – 4:20
B. "Time and Chance" (Instrumental) – 4:20

- US CD, single"

A. "Time and Chance" (Album Version) – 4:20
B. "Time and Chance" (Instrumental) – 4:20

- US CD, maxi-single"
1. "Time and Chance" (Album Mix) – 4:09
2. "Time and Chance" (Allstar's Six Feet deep Mix) – 4:33
3. "Time and Chance" (Funk On A Skunk Mix) – 5:21
4. "Time and Chance" (Allstar's Beat Down Mix) – 4:34
5. "Time and Chance" (CMB New York Mix) – 5:50

== Personnel ==
Credits and personnel adapted from Time and Chance album liner notes.

- Engineer – Warren Woods
- Engineer [Assistant] – Josh Achziger
- Producer – DJ Pooh
- Written-By – Mark Jordan (2)
- Written-By, Arranged By [Vocal Arrangements] – Color Me Badd, Mark Denard

== Charts ==
=== Weekly charts ===
Chart (1993–1994)	Peak position
Australia (ARIA)	170
Canada Retail Singles (The Record)	4
Canada Top Singles (RPM)	58
Europe (European Dance Radio)	17
UK Singles (Official Charts)	62
US Billboard Hot 100	23
US Dance Singles Sales (Billboard)	7
US Hot R&B/Hip-Hop Songs (Billboard)	9
US Rhythmic Airplay (Billboard)	18
US Cash Box Top 100	23

=== Year-end charts ===
Chart (1994)	Position
US Hot R&B/Hip-Hop Songs (Billboard)	51
