= Now & Forever (Color Me Badd album) =

Studio album by Color Me Badd
- Released: May 14, 1996
- Recorded: 1995–1996
- Genres: R&B; pop
- Length: 43:30
- Label: Giant Records
- Producers: Aaron Zigman, Babyface (musician), Chucky Thompson, Color Me Badd, Jon B, Narada Michael Walden, Nathan Morris,Sean Hall, Shawn Stockman, Christopher Stewart, Wanya Morris

Color Me Badd chronology
Time and Chance (1993)	Now & Forever (1996)

Professional ratings
Review scores
Source	Rating
Los Angeles Times	.
Entertainment Weekly	D
AllMusic	2/5 stars

Now & Forever is the third studio album by American R&B group Color Me Badd. Released in 1996, the album peaked at No. 113 on the Billboard albums chart.

== Background ==
Their record label Giant Records ended up becoming "Revolution Records" before they went to work on the project. This change included the company being restructured in a new direction (focusing on rock), only 50% of the staff remaining, new A&R, marketing personnel, and executives, with a changing roster, though the group remained.

The goal entering the production of the album was to "make people feel good", and "This time, the idea was to make an album that reflected what's going on today musically, while still showcasing our vocal harmonies,' according to Sam Watters. The grouped worked with producers Christopher "Tricky" Stewart and Sean "Sep" Hall, Jon B., Babyface, Narada Michael Walden, Chucky Thompson, and Boyz II Men's Nathan Morris, Wanya Morris, and Shawn Stockman. Color Me Badd co-produced the Mello Kings' 1957 doo wop hit "Tonite, Tonite", and co-wrote on Ain't Nobody Going Home" and "Soft N'Easy" with longtime musical associate Hamza Lee.

After the disappointment of their last album, according to Kevin Thornton (retrospectively), "By the third album, then the record company's basically saying, 'You don't know what you're talking about. We're going to take over. We're gonna pick the songs.". Mark Calderon also commented on the label interference after their disappointing sales of their last album, "When you haven't produced or had the big song or written the big record, the record company decides to take over. They end up choosing the single and what songs they want you to do once you don't have the golden ear anymore.".

According to Revolution marketing manager Connie Young, the album had a mass marketing retail campaign. The group also went on a three week promotional tour in Asia during the summer of 1996, consisting of television, radio, and showcasing performances amongst seven countries in the continent. Overall, the album "failed to ignite", and were released from their Giant recording contract. Regarding their depature from Giant/Revolution, the R&B an Pop divisions (which they were under) was diminished

== Track listing ==
No.	Title	Writer(s)	Producer	Length
1.	"Sexual Capacity"	(Robin Thicke, Sean K. Hall, Christopher A. Stewart)	(Robin Thicke)	4:11
2.	"Ooh Tonight"	(Jon B)	(Jon B)	4:39
3.	"The Earth, The Sun, The Rain"	(Elliot Wilff, Stacey Piersa)	(Narada Michael Walden)	4:16
4.	"The Last To Know"	(Dane DeViller, Sean Hosein, Stephen A. Kipner)	(Narada Michael Walden)	5:00
5.	"For All Eternity"	(Nathan Morris, Shawn Stockman, Wanya Morris)	(Nathan Morris, Shawn Stockman, Wanya Morris)	3:38
6.	"From The Back"	(Jon B)	(Jon B)	4:53
7.	"Ain't Nobody Goin' Home"	(Color Me Badd, Hamza Lee)	(Color Me Badd, Hamza Lee)	5:13
8.	"On My Mind"	(Color Me Badd, Faith Evans)	(Color Me Badd, Faith Evans)	3:50
9.	"Soft N' Easy"	(Color Me Badd, Hamza Lee)	(Color Me Badd, Hamza Lee)	4:57
10.	"Tonite, Tonite"	(William Nobles)	(William Nobles)	2:56

== Singles ==
1. "The Earth, the Sun, the Rain" – April 19, 1996
2. Sexual Capacity – August 27, 1996

== Personnel ==
Credits for Now&Forever adapted from Discogs.

1. Artwork [Art Direction] – Gabrielle Raumberger
2. Artwork [Design] – Dylan Tran
3. Backing Vocals – Color Me Badd (tracks: 1 to 7, 9, 10)
4. Engineer – Brad Gilderman (tracks: 2, 6), Branden Abein* (tracks: 1, 7), Darren Klein* (tracks: 11), Jim "Jiff" Hirger* (tracks: 5), Ken Schubert (tracks: 8), Mark Abetz (tracks: 1), Tim "Flash" Mariner* (tracks: 9), Tony "The Tiger" Flores* (tracks: 1, 7, 9)
5. Executive-Producer – Royal Bayyan
6. Lead Vocals – Bryan Abrams (tracks: 5, 6, 10), Color Me Badd (tracks: 1 to 4, 7, 9)
7. Mastered By – Herb Powers, Jr.*
8. Mixed By – Darren Klein* (tracks: 10), Dave Way (tracks: 8), David "Frazeman" Frazer* (tracks: 3, 4), Jon Gass (tracks: 2, 6), Kevin "K.D." Davis* (tracks: 7, 9), Neil Pogue* (tracks: 1)
9. Photography By [Band] – Jon Ragel (2)
10. Photography By [Wall Texture] – David Skernick
11. Producer – Aaron Zigman (tracks: 10), Babyface (tracks: 6), Chucky Thompson (tracks: 8), Color Me Badd (tracks: 10), Jonathan B.* (tracks: 2, 6), Narada Michael Walden (tracks: 3, 4), Nathan Morris (tracks: 5), Sean "Sep" Hall* (tracks: 1, 7, 9), Shawn Stockman (tracks: 5), Christopher "Tricky" Stewart* (tracks: 1, 7, 9), Wanya Morris (tracks: 5)

== Charts ==
=== Weekly charts ===
Chart (1996)	Peak position
Australian Albums (ARIA)	139
US Billboard 200	113
US Top R&B/Hip-Hop Albums (Billboard)	39
