= American Music Award for Favorite Adult Contemporary New Artist =

American music award

American Music Awards for Favorite Adult Contemporary New Artist
- Country: United States
- Presented by: American Music Awards
- First award: 1992
- Final award: 1994
- Currently held by: Toni Braxton
- Website: theamas.com

The American Music Award for Favorite Adult Contemporary New Artist was first awarded in 1992, but discontinued since 1994. Years reflect the year during which the awards were presented, for works released in the previous year. New Artists are still recognized, but the prize is awarded without regard to music genre.

== Winners and nominees ==
=== 1990s ===
| Year | Artist | Ref |
1992 (19th)
| 1992 (19th) | Michael W. Smith | |
| 1992 (19th) | Marc Cohn | |
| 1992 (19th) | The Triplets | |
1993 (20th)
| 1993 (20th) | k.d. lang | |
| 1993 (20th) | Jon Secada | |
| 1993 (20th) | Patty Smyth | |
1994 (21st)
| 1994 (21st) | Toni Braxton | |
| 1994 (21st) | Lauren Christy | |
| 1994 (21st) | Lisa Keith | |
