= Hass mich =

Single by Overground

from the album 2. OG
- Released: October 7, 2005
- Recorded: 2005
- Genre: Pop
- Length: 2:58
- Label: Velvet M-Pire; Edel
- Songwriter(s): Steve van Velvet
- Producer(s): Steve van Velvet

Overground singles chronology
"This Is How We Do It" (2004)	"Hass mich" (2005)

"Hass mich" (German: Hate Me) is a song by German boy band Overground. Written by Steve van Velvet, it was released on October 7, 2005 as a single, marking the band's first and only release with Velvet M-Pire Records following their departure from Cheyenne Records. While not as successful as previous singles, the ballad reached number 35 on the German Singles Chart.

== Formats and track listings ==
Maxi single
No.	Title	Length
1.	"Hass mich" (Radio/Single Version)
2.	"Es endet in Tränen" (Album Version)

== Charts ==
Chart (2005)	Peak position
Austria (Ö3 Austria Top 40)	35
