= Marq Porciuncula =

- Birth name: Marq Porciuncula
- Born: January 29, 1987 (age 38)
- Origin: Hamburg, Germany
- Genres: R&B, pop
- Occupation(s): Singer, songwriter, dancer, entertainer, choreographer, actor
- Years active: 2003–present

Marq Porciuncula (born January 29, 1987, in Hamburg, Germany) is a German singer, songwriter and occasional actor of Filipino descent.

== Biography ==
Marq Porciuncula was a prodigy in music and dance throughout his childhood. His growing interest in performing arts eventually led him to a casting for the German televised singing competition, Popstars, in July 2003. With over 13,000 participants, Marq was unexpectedly chosen and his life as a superstar unfolded.

On November 3, 2003, Meiko, Akay, Ken and Marq were launched as Overground and their first single "Schick mir nen Engel" simultaneously claimed the number one spot on the Media Control Charts in Germany, Austria and Switzerland and received a Gold record. Inevitably, their debut album "It's Done" eventually achieved a Platinum record. Within a few months, Overground succeeded in becoming the most popular and successful boy band within the territory.

After their last single "Hass Mich" Overground decided to take a break and Marq is now flying solo as he records his own songs and prepares himself to take a step further.

== Discography ==
=== Albums ===
- It's Done (2003) #1 GER
- 2. OG (2004) #41 GER

=== Singles ===
Year	Song	GER	AT	CH	Album
2003	"I Wanna Sex You Up" ¹	-	-	-	It's Done
2003	"Schick mir 'nen Engel"	1	1	1	It's Done
2004	"Der letzte Stern"	9	30	27	It's Done
2004	"Aus und vorbei"	10	39	–	2. OG
2004	"This Is How We Do It"(featuring Montell Jordan)	19	53	-	2. OG
2005	"Hass mich"	35	-	-	-
Notes: 1. Used as a promotion single; sold at McDonald's restaurants only.

== Awards ==
=== 2003 ===
- Bravo Otto (Gold) - "Best Newcomer Band"

=== 2004 ===
- Bravo Otto (Silver) - "Best Band National"
- Goldene Stimmgabel - "Best Newcomer Band"
- Goldener Pinguin - "Best Newcomer Band"
- Goldene Schallplatte - "TV Allstars"
- Goldene Schallplatte - "Schick mir 'nen Engel"
- Platin Schallplatte - "It's Done"

== Nomination ==
=== 2003 ===
- Goldene Schallplatte

=== 2004 ===
- Comet
- New Faces Award
- Echo
- Jetix Kids Award
- Goldene Schallplatte
