= Schick mir 'nen Engel =

Single by Overground

from the album It's Done
- Released: 10 November 2003
- Length: 3:42
- Label: Cheyenne; Polydor
- Songwriters: Deema; Mike Michaels; MM Dollar; Sammy Naja; O.K.A.N.; TK-Roxx
- Producers: Michaels; Dollar; Tabak; Naja

Overground singles chronology
"I Wanna Sex You Up" (2003)	"Schick mir 'nen Engel" (2003)	"Der letzte Stern" (2004)

"Schick mir 'nen Engel" ("Send Me an Angel") is a song by German boy band Overground. Composed by the Triple–M collective, it was written by Mike Michaels, MM Dollar, Sammy Naja, O.K.A.N., and TK-Roxx and produced by Michaels, Dollar, Mark Tabak, and Naja for their debut studio album It's Done (2003). Following Overground's formation on the ProSieben reality television show Popstars – Das Duell, the song was released just one week later as the album's leading single on 10 November 2003.

Upon release, "Schick mir 'nen Engel" reached number one in Austria, Germany, and Switzerland, becoming the third Popstars winner singles to debut atop the charts in all three territories. It spent two non-consecutive weeks at number one in Germany, achieving a gold certification from the Bundesverband Musikindustrie (BVMI).

== Background ==
"Schick mir 'nen Engel" was written by Mike Michaels, Mark "MM" Dollar, Mark Tabak, Sammy Naja, Jay "TK-Roxx" Khan and produced by Michaels, Dollar, Mark Tabak, and Naja for Overground's debut studio album It's Done (2003). Written late in the album's production process, when the majority of the record had already been completed, the song was composed only days before the album sessions concluded. It ultimately replaced "One for da Money" as the album's lead single.

== Track listings ==
Maxi single
No.	Title	Length
1.	"Schick mir 'nen Engel" (Single Version)	3:43
2.	"Schick mir 'nen Engel" (Orchester Version)	3:41
3.	"Wonderful Christmas Time" (Overground Single Version)	3:35
4.	"Schick mir 'nen Engel" (Instrumental)	3:42

== Charts ==
=== Weekly charts ===
Weekly chart performance for "Schick mir 'nen Engel"
Chart (2003)	Peak position
Austria (Ö3 Austria Top 40)	1
Germany (GfK)	1
Switzerland (Schweizer Hitparade)	1

=== Year-end charts ===
2003 year-end chart performance for "Schick mir 'nen Engel"
Chart (2003)	Position
Austria (Ö3 Austria Top 40)	39
Germany (Official German Charts)	28
Switzerland (Schweizer Hitparade)	22

2004 year-end chart performance for "Schick mir 'nen Engel"
Chart (2004)	Position
Austria (Ö3 Austria Top 40)	69
Switzerland (Schweizer Hitparade)	73

== Certifications and sales ==
Certifications for "Schick mir 'nen Engel"
Region	Certification	Certified units/sales
Germany (BVMI)	Gold	150,000^{^}
^{^} Shipments figures based on certification alone.
