= American Music Award for Favorite Adult Contemporary Album =

American music award

American Music Awards for Favorite Adult Contemporary Album
- Country: United States
- Presented by: American Music Awards
- First award: 1992
- Final award: 1994
- Currently held by: Whitney Houston – The Bodyguard
- Website: theamas.com

The American Music Award for Favorite Adult Contemporary Album was first awarded in 1992, but discontinued since 1994.

== 1990s ==
Year	Artist	Album	Ref
1992 (19th)
1992 (19th)	Natalie Cole	Unforgettable... with Love	
1992 (19th)	Paula Abdul	Spellbound	
1992 (19th)	Whitney Houston	I'm Your Baby Tonight	
1993 (20th)
1993 (20th)	Mariah Carey	MTV Unplugged	
1993 (20th)	Genesis	We Can't Dance	
1993 (20th)	Vanessa Williams	The Comfort Zone	
1994 (21st)
1994 (21st)	Whitney Houston	The Bodyguard	
1994 (21st)	Billy Joel	River of Dreams	
1994 (21st)	Kenny G	Breathless	
1994 (21st)	Rod Stewart	Unplugged...and Seated	
