= Choose (Color Me Badd song) =

Single by Color Me Badd

from the album Time and Chance
- Released: February 3, 1994
- Recorded: 1993
- Genre: R&B; pop
- Length: 4:23
- Label: Giant; Reprise
- Songwriters: Bryan Abrams; Mark Calderon; DJ Pooh; Kevin Thornton; Sam Watters; James Harris III, Terry Lewis
- Producer: James Harris III, Terry Lewis

Color Me Badd singles chronology
"Time and Chance" (1993)	"Choose" (1994)	"The Bells" (1994)

"Choose" is a song performed by American contemporary R&B group Color Me Badd, released in February 1994, by Giant and Reprise Records, as the second single from their second album, Time and Chance (1993). The song was co-written and produced by Jimmy Jam and Terry Lewis. It is about being so in love with someone, to the point that they will do what they don't want to do because of their love, and will do anything for that person, even it means dying for them, despite being heartbroken. The song peaked at No. 23 on the US Billboard Hot 100 on February 19, 1994 (their second consecutive song to peak at the spot) as well as No. 62 on the UK Singles Chart. The group would later admit that they felt the song should have been the lead single from the album and regret not making it such.

== Critical reception ==
Pan-European magazine Music & Media wrote, "And the swingbeat goes on! The rhythm may be very upfront, but is only there to support the harmony vocals, continuing a long American pop tradition which dates from '50s doo wop."

== Track listings ==
- US vinyl, 12, promo"

A1. "Choose" (Dem Kidz' Extended Radio Mix) – 4:18
A2. "Choose" (Dem Kidz' Street 3!@&) – 4:17
A3. "Choose" (Just The Beat Mix) – 4:17
A4. "Choose" (CMB Cool Mix) – 4:22
B1. "Choose" (Dave's Extended Radio Mix) – 3:51
B2. "Choose" (Dave's Extended Beat Mix) – 6:15
B3. "Choose" (Dem Kidz' Extended Mix Instrumental) – 4:18
B4. "Choose" (Album Version) – 3:51

- US vinyl, 7"

A. "Choose" (Radio Edit) – 4:00
B. "Choose" (Album Version) – 4:23

- US CD, single, promo"
1. "Choose" (Radio Edit) – 4:00
2. "Choose" (Version #1) – 3:54
3. "Choose" (Version #2) – 3:34
4. "Choose" (Version #3) – 3:54
5. "Choose" (Version #4) – 4:23
- US CD, maxi-single"
1. "Choose" – 4:22
2. "Choose" (Dem Kidz' Radio Edit)
3. "Choose" (Dave's Radio Edit)
4. "Choose" (CMB Cool Mix)
5. "Choose" (Dem Kidz' Street #!@&)
6. "Choose" (Dave's Beat Mix Edit)
7. "Choose" (Dave's Guitar Mix Edit)
- US cassette, single, Dol"

A. "Choose" (Radio Edit) – 4:00
B. "Choose" (Album Version) – 4:23

== Personnel ==
Credits and personnel adapted from Time and Chance album liner notes.

- Arranged By [Vocal Arrangements] – Color Me Badd
- Engineer – Steve Hodge
- Instruments [All], Arranged By [Rhythm Arrangements] – Jimmy Jam And Terry Lewis*
- Producer – Jimmy Jam And Terry Lewis*
- Written-By – Color Me Badd, James Harris III, Terry Lewis

== Charts ==
Chart (1994)	Peak position
Australia (ARIA)	56
Canada Retail Singles (The Record)	16
Canada Top Singles (RPM)	31
Europe (European Dance Radio)	24
Iceland (Íslenski Listinn Topp 40)	33
New Zealand (Recorded Music NZ)	45
UK Singles (Official Charts)	62
UK Club Chart (Music Week)	36
US Billboard Hot 100	23
US Top 40/Mainstream (Billboard)	5
US Top 40/Rhythm-Crossover (Billboard)	24
US Cash Box Top 100	20
