= Geoffrey Williams =

- Born: Geoffrey Williams; 1963 (age 62–63)
- Origin: London, England
- Genres: Soul, funk, pop
- Occupations: Singer, songwriter, musician, producer
- Instruments: Vocals, keyboards, guitar
- Years active: 1984–present
- Labels: Atlantic, Polydor, Giant, EMI, Hands On Records, Movement Records, Oyster Music, Kobalt Music
- Website: geoffreywilliams.wordpress.com

Geoffrey Williams is an English singer and songwriter. Five of his singles charted on the UK Singles Chart in the 1990s. In the U.S., "It's Not a Love Thing", from his third album Bare (1992), reached No. 70 on the Billboard Hot 100.

== Discography ==
=== Albums ===
- Heroes, Spies and Gypsies (1988, Atlantic Records)
- Prisoner of Love (1989, Atlantic)
- Bare (1992, Giant Records/Reprise Records)
- The Drop (1996, Hands On Records)
- Move into Soul (2008, Oyster Music)
- Yes Is the Answer! (2012, Kobalt Music)

=== Singles ===
- "I Want You to Stop (Calling Me Up)" (1984, Code Records)
- "There's a Need in Me" (1987, Polydor) UK No.166
- "Cinderella" (1988, Polydor), Germany, No. 9
- "Lipstick" (1988, Atlantic) UK No.155
- "Prisoner of Love" (1989, Atlantic)
- "Blue" (1989, Atlantic) UK No.134
- "Blue (Remix)" (1990, Atlantic) UK No.123
- "It's Not a Love Thing" (1992, EMI, UK; Giant/Reprise, U.S.) — UK, No. 63; U.S., No. 70
- "Summer Breeze" (1992, EMI) — UK, No. 56
- "Deliver Me Up" (1992, Giant/Reprise)
- "Sex Life" (1995, Hands On) — UK, No. 83
- "I Don't Want to Talk About It" (1995, Hands On)
- "I Guess I Will Always Love You/Free Your Mind" (1995, Hands On) — UK, No. 91
- "I Guess I Will Always Love You" (1996, Hands On) — UK, No. 79
- "Drive" (1996, Hands On) — UK, No. 52
- "Sex Life" (1997, Hands On) — UK, No. 71
- "Somewhere on a Beach" (2005, Oyster Music)

=== As songwriter ===
- "Born This Way" (cowritten by Simon Stirling; from Dusty Springfield's Reputation, 1990)
- "I'll Be There" (cowritten by Simon Stirling; from Eternal's Always & Forever, 1993)
- "Rosanna's Little Sister" (cowritten by Chuck Norman; from Color Me Badd's Time and Chance, 1993)
- "Whatever Happens" (cowritten by Gil Cang, Michael Jackson, Jasmine Quay, and Teddy Riley; from Jackson's Invincible, 2001)

== Current work ==
Williams currently teaches at the University of Melbourne.

He still releases music on his Bandcamp page. The most recent releases were The Sidewinder Project, which was a collection of collaborations in 1997/1998 and Cosmic Love EP.
