= American Music Awards of 1994 =

US television program

21st Annual American Music Awards
- Date: February 7, 1994
- Location: Shrine Auditorium, Los Angeles, California
- Country: United States
- Hosted by: Meat Loaf; Reba McEntire; Will Smith
- Most awards: Whitney Houston (7 + 1 special award)
- Most nominations: Whitney Houston (8)

Television/radio coverage
- Network: ABC
- Runtime: 180 min.
- Produced by: Dick Clark Productions

The 21st Annual American Music Awards were held on February 7, 1994, at the Shrine Auditorium, in Los Angeles, California. The awards recognized the most popular artists and albums from the year 1993.

Whitney Houston was the big winner of the night, winning seven out of the eight awards she was nominated for. She also won the Award of Merit that night. Houston's wins that night tied her with Michael Jackson for the most award wins in a single night and is also a record number of wins for a female artist in the show's history.

== Performances ==
Artist(s)	Song(s)
Toni Braxton	"Another Sad Love Song"
Brooks & Dunn	"Hard Workin' Man"
Michael Bolton	"Said I Loved You...But I Lied"
Snoop Doggy Dogg; Dr. Dre	"Gin and Juice"
DJ Jazzy Jeff & The Fresh Prince	"I Wanna Rock"
Kenny G	"Forever in Love"
Gloria Estefan	"Mi Tierra"
Vince Gill; Gladys Knight	"Ain't Nothing Like The Real Thing"
Gin Blossoms	"Hey Jealousy"
Whitney Houston	"I Loves You, Porgy" "And I Am Telling You I'm Not Going" "I Have Nothing"
Meat Loaf	"Rock and Roll Dreams Come Through"
Rod Stewart	"Maggie May" "Having a Party"

== Winners and nominees ==
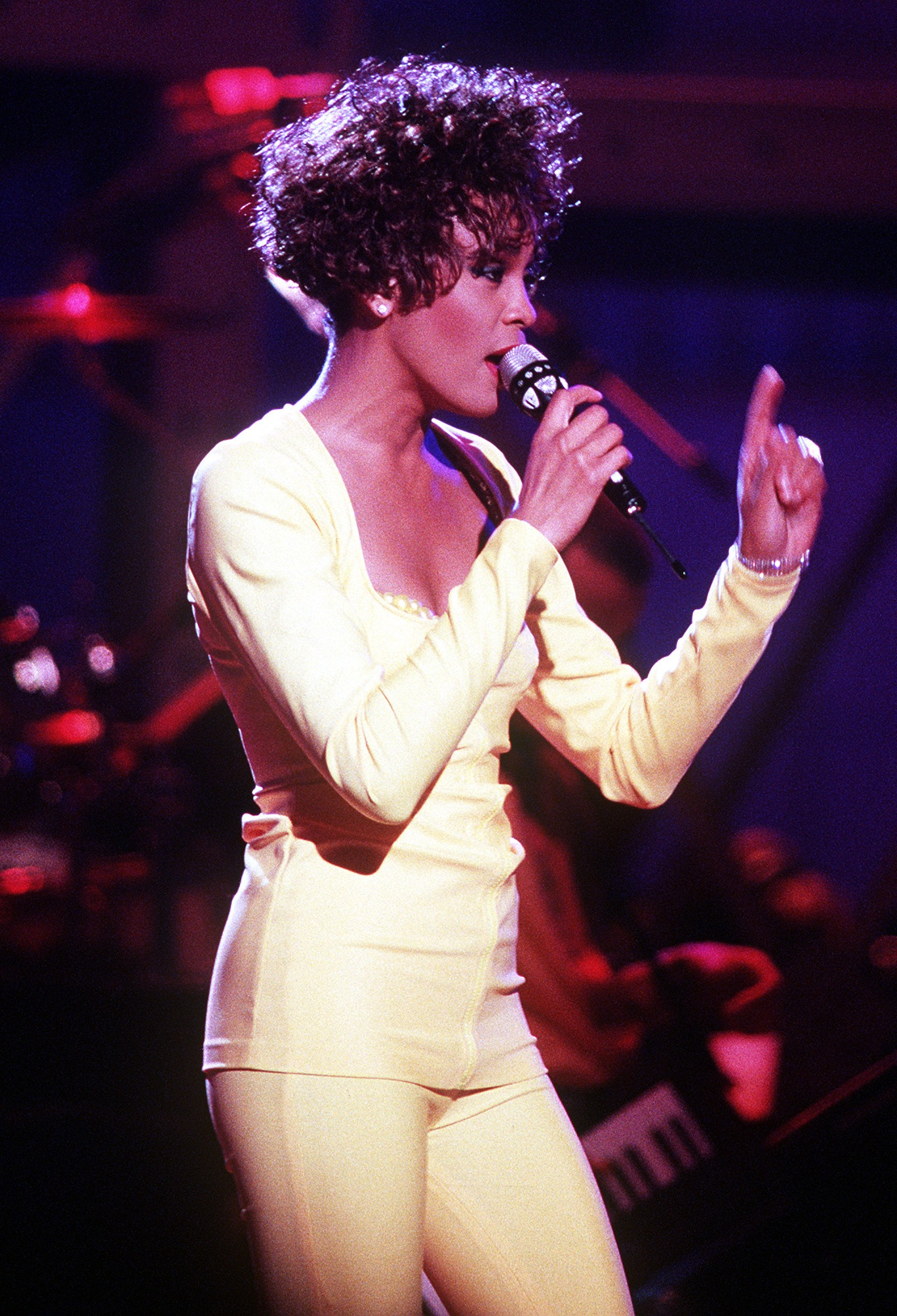
Whitney Houston was the biggest winner of the night with eight awards.

Subcategory	Winner	Nominees
Pop/Rock Category
Favorite Pop/Rock Male Artist	Eric Clapton	Michael Bolton; Michael Jackson; Rod Stewart
Favorite Pop/Rock Female Artist	Whitney Houston	Mariah Carey; Gloria Estefan; Janet Jackson
Favorite Pop/Rock Band/Duo/Group	Aerosmith	Pearl Jam; U2
Favorite Pop/Rock Album	The Bodyguard Soundtrack - Whitney Houston	janet. - Janet Jackson; Pocket Full of Kryptonite - Spin Doctors; Unplugged - Eric Clapton
Favorite Pop/Rock Song	"I Will Always Love You" - Whitney Houston	"Can't Help Falling in Love" - UB40 "Whoomp! (There It Is)" - Tag Team
Favorite Pop/Rock New Artist	Stone Temple Pilots	Blind Melon; SWV
Soul/R&B Category
Favorite Soul/R&B Male Artist	Luther Vandross	Babyface; Bobby Brown; Michael Jackson
Favorite Soul/R&B Female Artist	Whitney Houston	Toni Braxton; Mariah Carey; Janet Jackson
Favorite Soul/R&B Band/Duo/Group	En Vogue	Arrested Development; SWV
Favorite Soul/R&B Album	The Bodyguard Soundtrack - Whitney Houston	janet. - Janet Jackson; It's About Time - SWV; Lose Control - Silk
Favorite Soul/R&B Song	"I Will Always Love You" - Whitney Houston	"Dreamlover" - Mariah Carey "That's the Way Love Goes" - Janet Jackson
Favorite Soul/R&B New Artist	Toni Braxton	Silk; SWV
Country Category
Favorite Country Male Artist	Garth Brooks	Vince Gill; Alan Jackson; George Strait
Favorite Country Female Artist	Reba McEntire	Mary Chapin Carpenter; Dolly Parton; Wynonna
Favorite Country Band/Duo/Group	Alabama	Brooks & Dunn; Little Texas
Favorite Country Album	A Lot About Livin' (And a Little 'Bout Love) - Alan Jackson	Hard Workin' Man - Brooks & Dunn; In Pieces - Garth Brooks; It's Your Call - Reba McEntire
Favorite Country Song	"Chattahoochee" - Alan Jackson	"A Bad Goodbye" - Clint Black & Wynonna "Romeo" - Dolly Parton & Friends
Favorite Country New Artist	John Michael Montgomery	Tracy Byrd; Clay Walker
Adult Contemporary Category
Favorite Adult Contemporary Artist	Kenny G	Michael Bolton; Whitney Houston
Favorite Adult Contemporary Album	The Bodyguard Soundtrack - Whitney Houston	Breathless - Kenny G River of Dreams - Billy Joel; Unplugged...and Seated - Rod Stewart
Favorite Adult Contemporary New Artist	Toni Braxton	Lauren Christy; Lisa Keith
Heavy Metal/Hard Rock Category
Favorite Heavy Metal/Hard Rock Artist	Aerosmith	Metallica; Pearl Jam
Favorite Heavy Metal/Hard Rock New Artist	Stone Temple Pilots	Blind Melon; The Smashing Pumpkins
Rap/Hip-Hop Category
Favorite Rap/Hip-Hop Artist	Dr. Dre	Arrested Development; Naughty by Nature
Favorite Rap/Hip-Hop New Artist	Dr. Dre	Onyx; 2Pac
Merit
Whitney Houston
International Artist Award
Rod Stewart
