= Der letzte Stern =

Single by Overground

from the album It's Done
- Released: March 1, 2004
- Recorded: 2004
- Genre: Pop
- Length: 3:34
- Label: Cheyenne; Polydor; Zeitgeist
- Songwriter(s): Mike Michaels; MM Dollar; Mark Tabak; Deema
- Producer(s): Michaels; Dollar; Tabak

Overground singles chronology
"Schick mir 'nen Engel" (2003)	"Der letzte Stern" (2004)	"Aus und vorbei" (2004)

"Der letzte Stern" (German: The Final Star) is a song by German boy band Overground. Composed by the Triple–M collective, it is a partially rewritten variation of the song "Wenn Die Blätter", which was written by Mike Michaels, MM Dollar, Mark Tabak, and Deema and produced by Michaels, Dollar, and Mark Tabak for Overground's debut studio album It's Done (2003). It was released as the band's second single on March 1, 2004, reaching number nine on the German Singles Chart and the top thirty in Austria and Switzerland.

In January 2004, it was revealed that Overground would compete in the national final Germany 12 Points! with "Der letzte Stern" for a chance to represent Germany at the Eurovision Song Contest 2004. On March 19, 2004, they lost to Max Mutzke and his song "Can't Wait Until Tonight".

== Formats and track listings ==
Maxi single
No.	Title	Length
1.	"Der letzte Stern" (Single Version)	3:34
2.	"Frei sein"	3:41
3.	"The Rain" (English Version)	3:34
4.	"Der letzte Stern" (Instrumental)	3:34

== Charts ==
Chart (2004)	Peak position
Austria (Ö3 Austria Top 40)	30
Germany (GfK)	9
Switzerland (Schweizer Hitparade)	27
