= American Music Award for Favorite Adult Contemporary Artist =

American music award

American Music Awards for Favorite Adult Contemporary Artist
- Country: United States
- Presented by: American Music Awards
- First award: 1992
- Final award: 2020
- Currently held by: Jonas Brothers

Highlights
- Most wins: Celine Dion (4)
- Most nominations: Celine Dion (6)
- Website: theamas.com

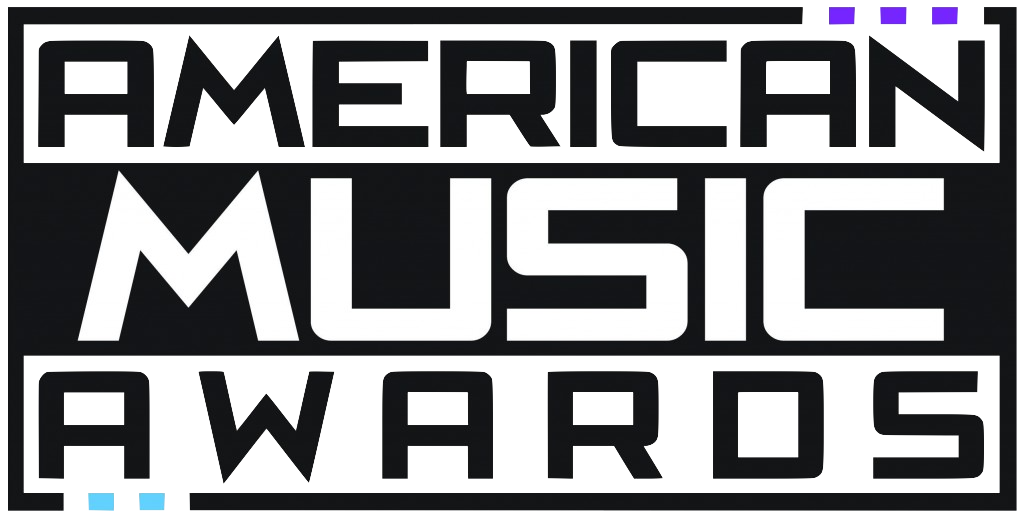
The AMA Logo

The American Music Awards for Favorite Artist – Adult Contemporary has been awarded since 1992. Years reflect the year during which the awards were presented, for works released in the previous year (until 2003 onward, when awards were handed out on November of the same year). The all-time winner in this category is Celine Dion with 4 wins, she is also the most nominated artist with 6 nominations.

== Winners and nominees ==
=== 1990s ===
Year	Artist	Ref
1992 (19th)
1992 (19th)	Natalie Cole	
1992 (19th)	Paula Abdul	
1992 (19th)	Whitney Houston	
1993 (20th)
1993 (20th)	Michael Bolton	
1993 (20th)	Mariah Carey	
1993 (20th)	Genesis	
1994 (21st)
1994 (21st)	Kenny G	
1994 (21st)	Michael Bolton	
1994 (21st)	Whitney Houston	
1995 (22nd)
1995 (22nd)	Michael Bolton	
1995 (22nd)	Boyz II Men	
1995 (22nd)	Mariah Carey	
1996 (23rd)
1996 (23rd)	Eagles	
1996 (23rd)	Hootie & the Blowfish	
1996 (23rd)	Michael Jackson	
1997 (24th)
1997 (24th)	Whitney Houston	
1997 (24th)	Mariah Carey	
1997 (24th)	Celine Dion	
1998 (25th)
1998 (25th)	Elton John	
1998 (25th)	Michael Bolton	
1998 (25th)	Celine Dion	
1999 (26th)
1999 (26th)	Celine Dion	
1999 (26th)	Backstreet Boys	
1999 (26th)	Shania Twain	

=== 2000s ===
Year	Artist	Ref
2000 (27th)
2000 (27th)	Phil Collins	
2000 (27th)	Cher	
2000 (27th)	Shania Twain	
2001 (28th)
2001 (28th)	Celine Dion	
2001 (28th)	Marc Anthony	
2001 (28th)	Faith Hill	
2002 (29th)
2002 (29th)	Sade	
2002 (29th)	Enya	
2002 (29th)	LeAnn Rimes	
2003 (30th)
2003 (30th)	Celine Dion	
2003 (30th)	Vanessa Carlton	
2003 (30th)	Five for Fighting	
2003 (31st)
2003 (31st)	Celine Dion	
2003 (31st)	Cher	
2003 (31st)	Norah Jones	
2004 (32nd)
2004 (32nd)	Sheryl Crow	
2004 (32nd)	Harry Connick Jr.	
2004 (32nd)	Norah Jones	
2005 (33rd)
2005 (33rd)	Kelly Clarkson	
2005 (33rd)	Maroon 5	
2005 (33rd)	John Mayer	
2006 (34th)
2006 (34th)	Kelly Clarkson	
2006 (34th)	Michael Bublé	
2006 (34th)	Rob Thomas	
2007 (35th)
2007 (35th)	Daughtry	
2007 (35th)	Norah Jones	
2007 (35th)	John Mayer	
2008 (36th)
2008 (36th)	Jordin Sparks	
2008 (36th)	Daughtry	
2008 (36th)	Eagles	
2009 (37th)
2009 (37th)	Taylor Swift	
2009 (37th)	Daughtry	
2009 (37th)	Jason Mraz	

=== 2010s ===
Year	Artist	Ref
2010 (38th)
2010 (38th)	Michael Bublé	
2010 (38th)	Lady Antebellum	
2010 (38th)	Train	
2011 (39th)
2011 (39th)	Adele	
2011 (39th)	Bruno Mars	
2011 (39th)	Katy Perry	
2012 (40th)
2012 (40th)	Adele	
2012 (40th)	Kelly Clarkson	
2012 (40th)	Train	
2013 (41st)
2013 (41st)	Maroon 5	
2013 (41st)	Bruno Mars	
2013 (41st)	P!nk	
2014 (42nd)
2014 (42nd)	Katy Perry	
2014 (42nd)	Sara Bareilles	
2014 (42nd)	OneRepublic	
2015 (43rd)
2015 (43rd)	Taylor Swift	
2015 (43rd)	Ed Sheeran	
2015 (43rd)	Meghan Trainor	
2016 (44th)
2016 (44th)	Adele	
2016 (44th)	Rachel Platten	
2016 (44th)	Meghan Trainor	
2017 (45th)
2017 (45th)	Shawn Mendes	
2017 (45th)	Bruno Mars	
2017 (45th)	Ed Sheeran	
2018 (46th)
2018 (46th)	Shawn Mendes	
2018 (46th)	Pink	
2018 (46th)	Ed Sheeran	
2019 (47th)
2019 (47th)	Taylor Swift	
2019 (47th)	Pink	
2019 (47th)	Maroon 5	

=== 2020s ===
Year	Artist	Ref
2020 (48th)
2020 (48th)	Jonas Brothers	
2020 (48th)	Lewis Capaldi	
2020 (48th)	Maroon 5	

== Category facts ==
=== Multiple wins ===
4 wins

- Celine Dion

3 wins

- Adele
- Taylor Swift

2 wins

- Michael Bolton
- Kelly Clarkson
- Shawn Mendes

=== Multiple nominations ===
6 nominations

- Celine Dion

4 nominations

- Michael Bolton
- Maroon 5

3 nominations

- Adele
- Mariah Carey
- Kelly Clarkson
- Daughtry
- Whitney Houston
- Norah Jones
- Bruno Mars
- P!nk
- Ed Sheeran
- Taylor Swift

2 nominations

- Michael Bublé
- Cher
- Eagles
- John Mayer
- Shawn Mendes
- Katy Perry
- Train
- Meghan Trainor
- Shania Twain
- Phil Collins (once as a solo artist and once as a member of Genesis)
