= Slow Motion (Color Me Badd song) =

1992 single by Color Me Badd

Single by Color Me Badd

from the album C.M.B.
- Released: May 7, 1992
- Recorded: 1991
- Genre: R&B; new jack swing
- Length: 4:36
- Label: Giant; Reprise
- Songwriters: Bryan Abrams; Mark Calderon; Howard Thompson; Kevin Thornton; Sam Watters
- Producer: Howie Tee

Color Me Badd singles chronology
| "Heartbreaker" (1992) | "Slow Motion" (1992) | "Forever Love" (1992) |

"Slow Motion" is an R&B and new jack swing song by American music group Color Me Badd from their debut album, C.M.B. (1991). It was released as the fifth single (fourth in North America) in May 1992 by Giant and Reprise Records. The song was remixed from the album version (which is more nuanced, and typical new jack swing) to add more funky elements to the music, and added a feature by Bootsy Collins for the single release. The song is about having sexual intercourse with a partner, and wanting to continue make love to them slowly all night long. It peaked at No. 18 on the Billboard Hot 100 on June 13, 1992, and lasted 20 weeks on the chart. It also reached No. 40 on the Canadian charts. The accompanying music video received support on MTV, The Box, Friday Night Videos, and BET.

== Critical reception ==
Larry Flick from Billboard magazine wrote, "Color Me Badd gets down and dirty in this sexy midtempo romp, in which graphic lyrics read like an anthem for the sexually sensitive male. Sultry, provocative love song describes the ideal mate who wants to love you slow, so morning don't come before I do. Sounds like yet another pop radio smash."

== Track listings ==
- US vinyl, 12, promo"

A1. "Slow Motion" (Freeze Frame Mix) — 4:36
A2. "Slow Motion" (Main Mix 2) — 4:36
A3. "Slow Motion" (Simplicity) — 4:25
B1. "Slow Motion" (Originality) — 4:25
B2. "Slow Motion" (No Drumplicity) — 4:25
B3. "Slow Motion" (Instrumental) — 4:36

- US vinyl, 7"

A. "Slow Motion" (Freeze Frame Mix) — 4:36
B. "Slow Motion" (Main Mix 2) — 4:36

- US CD, maxi"
1. "Slow Motion" (Freeze Frame Mix) — 4:36
2. "Slow Motion" (Main Mix 2) — 4:36
3. "Slow Motion" (Simplicity) — 4:25
4. "Slow Motion" (Originality) — 4:25
5. "Slow Motion" (No Drumplicity) — 4:25
6. "Slow Motion" (Instrumental) — 4:33
7. "Slow Motion" (Album Mix) — 4:24
- US CD, maxi, promo"'
1. "Slow Motion" (Freeze Frame Mix) — 4:36
2. "Slow Motion" (Main Mix 2) — 4:36
3. "Slow Motion" (Simplicity) — 4:25
4. "Slow Motion" (Originality) — 4:25
5. "Slow Motion" (No Drumplicity) — 4:25
6. "Slow Motion" (Instrumental) — 4:36
7. "Slow Motion" (LP Mix) — 4:25
- US cassette, single"

A. "Slow Motion" (Freeze Frame Mix) — 4:36
B. "Slow Motion" (Main Mix 2) — 4:36

== Personnel ==
- Engineer – Howie Tee, Michael Fossenkemper
- Producer, Mixed By – Howie Tee
- Written-By – Color Me Badd, Howard Thompson (6)

== Charts ==
=== Weekly charts ===
| Chart (1992) | Peak position |
|---|---|
| Canada Top Singles (RPM) | 40 |
| Israel (Israeli Singles Chart) | 26 |
| US Billboard Hot 100 | 18 |
| US Cash Box Top 100 | 10 |

=== Year-end charts ===
| Chart (1992) | Position |
|---|---|
| US Billboard Hot 100 | 87 |
