= Aus und vorbei =

Single by Overground

from the album 2. OG
- Released: July 5, 2004
- Recorded: 2004
- Genre: Pop
- Length: 3:33
- Label: Cheyenne; Polydor; Zeitgeist
- Songwriter(s): Mark Tabak; Deema; Gena Wernik; Akay Kayed; Mark Joker; O.K.A.N.
- Producer(s): Wernik; Tabak

Overground singles chronology
| "Der letzte Stern" (2004) | "Aus und vorbei" (2004) | "This Is How We Do It" (2004) |

"Aus und vorbei" (German: Over and Done) is a song by German boy band Overground. It was written by Mark Tabak, Deema, Gena Wernik, Mark Joker, O.K.A.N., and band member Akay Kayed for the group's second studio album 2. OG (2004), while production was helmed by Tabak and Wernik. Released as the album's lead single on July 5, 2004, the ballad reached number ten on the German Singles Chart and made it to the top forty in Austria.

== Formats and track listings ==
Maxi single
| No. | Title | Length |
|---|---|---|
| 1. | "Aus und vorbei" (Radio Edit) | 3:33 |
| 2. | "Aus und vorbei" (Remix) | 3:30 |
| 3. | "Aus und vorbei" (Karaoke) | 4:01 |
| 4. | "Tanz mit dir" (Live Tour-Video) | 6:05 |

== Charts ==
| Chart (2004) | Peak position |
|---|---|
| Austria (Ö3 Austria Top 40) | 39 |
| Germany (GfK) | 10 |
