= C.M.B. =

Studio album by Color Me Badd
- Released: July 23, 1991
- Recorded: 1990–1991
- Studios: Unique Recording Studios, New York City; Homeboy Recording, New York City
- Genres: New jack swing, R&B
- Length: 44:11
- Labels: Giant; Reprise
- Producers: Royal Bayyan; Tarik Bayyan; Dr. Freeze; Hamza Lee; Nick Mundy; Spyderman; Howie Tee

Color Me Badd chronology
C.M.B. (1991)	Time and Chance (1993)

Singles from C.M.B.
- 1. "I Wanna Sex You Up" Released: March 2, 1991; 2. "I Adore Mi Amor" Released: July 17, 1991; 3. "All 4 Love" Released: November 7, 1991; 4. "Color Me Badd" Released: 1991; 5. "Thinkin' Back" Released: 1992; 6. "Heartbreaker" Released: 1992; 7. "Slow Motion" Released: 1992

Professional ratings
Review scores
Source	Rating
AllMusic	4/5 stars
Encyclopedia of Popular Music	4/5 stars
Entertainment Weekly	C+
Los Angeles Times	2/4 stars
The Village Voice	(1-star Honorable Mention)

C.M.B. is the debut studio album by American R&B group Color Me Badd, released on July 23, 1991, by Giant Records. It was produced by several record producers, including Dr. Freeze, Nick Mundy, and Howie Tee.

The album received mixed reviews from critics, who found the production and lyrics generic despite some decent vocal work. C.M.B. peaked at number 3 on the US Billboard 200 and spawned seven singles: "I Wanna Sex You Up", "I Adore Mi Amor", "All 4 Love", "Color Me Badd", "Thinkin' Back", "Heartbreaker", and "Slow Motion". The album was certified triple platinum by the Recording Industry Association of America (RIAA), denoting shipments of three million copies in the country.

== Commercial performance ==
The album reached number three on the US Billboard 200, spending 77 weeks on the chart, and shipped one million copies within its first two months of release in the United States. It also charted at number three in the United Kingdom, and was certified gold by the British Phonographic Industry on September 1, 1991, having shipped 100,000 copies in the UK.

It produced five US hit singles: "I Wanna Sex You Up" (US No. 2), "I Adore Mi Amor" (US No. 1), "All 4 Love" (US No. 1), "Thinkin' Back" (US No. 16), and "Slow Motion" (US No. 18). On July 15, 1992, C.M.B. was certified triple platinum by the Recording Industry Association of America (RIAA), for shipments of three million copies in the US.

== Critical reception ==
Arion Berger of Entertainment Weekly gave the album a "C+" and criticized its content: "However decent C.M.B.'s intentions of turning street-corner harmonies into dance-floor grooves, nothing on their debut — not their four fine voices, glossy production, or titillating youthful smut — sounds honest." In his consumer guide for The Village Voice, critic Robert Christgau gave it a one-star honorable mention, indicating "a worthy effort consumers attuned to its overriding aesthetic or individual vision may well like." In a retrospective review of the album, AllMusic editor Alex Henderson gave C.M.B. four out of five stars and said that "most of the songs are pedestrian and generic," but wrote that it "does have its moments, including the hit slow jams 'I Adore Mi Amor' and 'I Wanna Sex You Up' (which samples rapper Slick Rick in a rather clever fashion)."

== Track listing ==
No.	Title	Writer(s)	Producer	Length
1.	"I Wanna Sex You Up"	Elliot Straite	Dr. Freeze	4:06
2.	"All 4 Love"	Color Me Badd; Howard Thompson	Howie Tee	3:30
3.	"Heartbreaker"	Color Me Badd; Thompson; Tarik Bayyan	Tee	3:58
4.	"I Adore Mi Amor"	Color Me Badd; Hamza Lee	Royal Bayyan; Hamza Lee	4:49
5.	"Groove My Mind"	Royal Bayyan	Royal Bayyan	5:06
6.	"I Wanna Sex You Up (Reprise)"	Straite		1:09
7.	"Roll the Dice"	Nick Mundy; Gina Gomez	Nick Mundy	4:47
8.	"Slow Motion"	Color Me Badd; Thompson	Tee	4:24
9.	"Thinkin' Back"	Color Me Badd; Troy Taylor; Lee	Royal Bayyan; Lee	5:21
10.	"I Adore Mi Amor (Interlude)"	Color Me Badd; Lee		0:48
11.	"Color Me Badd"	Straite	Dr. Freeze; Spydermann^{[a]}	4:05
12.	"Your da One I Onena Love"	Color Me Badd; Thompson	Tee	4:08

Notes

- ^{^[a]} signifies a co-producer

== Personnel ==
Credits for C.M.B. adapted from AllMusic.

- Bryan Abrams – vocals
- Royal Bayyan – producer, mixing
- Tarik Bayyan – producer, writer
- Mark Calderon – vocals
- Steve Casper – assistant engineer
- Acar Key – engineer
- Pavel DeJesus – assistant engineer
- Buck Dewit – assistant engineer
- D'La Vance – keyboards
- Dr. Freeze – producer, mixing
- Michael Fossenkemper – engineer
- Nat Foster – engineer, assistant engineer
- Michael Lavine – photography
- Hamza Lee – keyboards, producer, mixing
- Josh Melville – engineer
- Cassandra Mills – executive producer
- Nick Mundy – arranger, programming, producer, engineer
- Angela Piva – engineer
- James Pollock – engineer, mixing
- Johnny Potoker – mixing
- Donna Roth – assistant engineer
- Doug Schwartz – engineer
- Donnell Spencer – drum programming
- Spyderman – producer, mixing
- Howie Tee – producer, engineer, mixing
- Kevin Thornton – vocals
- Dirk Walter – design
- Sam Watters – vocals
- Warren Woods – engineer, mixing

== Charts ==
=== Weekly charts ===
Chart (1991)	Peak position
Australian Albums (ARIA)	17
Austrian Albums (Ö3 Austria)	32
Canadian Albums (RPM)	6
Dutch Albums (Album Top 100)	9
European Albums Chart	8
German Albums (Offizielle Top 100)	23
New Zealand Albums (RMNZ)	15
Swedish Albums (Sverigetopplistan)	30
Swiss Albums (Schweizer Hitparade)	27
UK Albums (Official Charts)	3
US Billboard 200	3
US Top R&B/Hip-Hop Albums (Billboard)	3
Zimbabwean Albums (ZIMA)	4

=== Year-end charts ===
Chart (1991)	Position
Dutch Albums (Album Top 100)	33
UK Albums (OCC)	62
US Billboard 200	58
US Top R&B/Hip-Hop Albums (Billboard)	80
Chart (1992)	Position
US Billboard 200	19
US Top R&B/Hip-Hop Albums (Billboard)	90

== Certifications ==
Region	Certification	Certified units/sales
Australia (ARIA)	Gold	35,000^{^}
Canada (Music Canada)	2× Platinum	200,000^{^}
Singapore (SPVA)	—	18,000
United Kingdom (BPI)	Gold	100,000^{^}
United States (RIAA)	3× Platinum	3,000,000^{^}
^{^} Shipments figures based on certification alone.
