= The Comfort Zone (album) =

Studio album by Vanessa Williams
- Released: August 20, 1991
- Studios: Bennett House, Nashville, TN; Blondahl Studio, Copenhagen, Denmark; Creative Source Studios, Studio City, CA; D&D Recording Studios, New York, NY; Digital Recorders, Nashville, TN; Hollywood Sound, Los Angeles, CA; Home Base Recording, New York, NY; Marathon Studios, New York, NY; Nightingale Recording Studio, Nashville, TN; Ocean Way Recording, Hollywood, CA; Right Track Recording Studios, New York, NY; Summa Music Group, Los Angeles, CA; Sunset Sound Studios, Los Angeles, CA; Teen Town Studio, Copenhagen, Denmark; Westlake Audio, Los Angeles, CA
- Genre: R&B
- Length: 66:27
- Labels: Wing; Mercury
- Producers: Derek Bramble; Gerry Brown; Bruce Carbone; Dave Darlington; DJ L.A. Jay; Kenni Hairston; Kipper Jones; Brian McKnight; Phase 5; Mark Stevens; Reggie Stewart; Keith Thomas; Vanessa Williams

Vanessa Williams chronology
The Right Stuff (1988)	The Comfort Zone (1991)	The Sweetest Days (1994)

Singles from The Comfort Zone
- 1. "Running Back to You" Released: July 16, 1991; 2. "The Comfort Zone" Released: October 29, 1991; 3. "Save the Best for Last" Released: January 14, 1992; 4. "Just for Tonight" Released: April 21, 1992; 5. "Work to Do" Released: July 21, 1992

Professional ratings
Review scores
Source	Rating
AllMusic	4/5 stars
Entertainment Weekly	A
Chicago Tribune	3/4 stars
PopMatters	8/10
Encyclopedia of Popular Music	4/5 stars
The Rolling Stone Album Guide	4/5 stars

The Comfort Zone is the second studio album by American singer and actress Vanessa Williams. It was released on August 20, 1991, by Mercury's Wing Records Label.

== Singles ==
The first single from the album, called "Running Back to You", was released on July 16, 1991. For an uptempo song, the track peaked at number one on the Billboard Hot R&B/Hip-Hop Songs chart and number 18 on the Billboard Hot 100 chart.

The second single from the album, called "The Comfort Zone", was released on October 29. Upon its release, the song peaked at number 62 on the Hot 100, and number two on the Hot R&B/Hip-Hop Songs chart.

The third single from the album, "Save the Best for Last", was released on January 14, 1992. Upon its release, the song reached number one on the US Billboard Hot 100 for five consecutive weeks.

"Just for Tonight" was released as the fourth single from the album on April 21. Upon its release, that song reached at number 26 on the Hot 100, followed by the fifth and final single from the album, "Work to Do", in which was released on July 21 and achieved a moderate success.

== Critical reception ==
Arion Berger from Entertainment Weekly gave the album an A, writing, "With 14 longish songs, beautifully sequenced and warmly sung, The Comfort Zone is less a pop record than the soundtrack to a giddy, heartfelt R&B stage musical about love — minus the man."

He highlighted "The Comfort Zone", "Running Back to You", "Save the Best for Last", "What Will I Tell My Heart", "Freedom Dance" and "Goodbye", and concluded, "Through it all, the keyboard romps, the drums get busy, and a flute adds occasional breathy punctuation. Give the lady a great big hand."

== Commercial performance ==
The album peaked at number 17 on the US Billboard 200 and reached number one on the Billboard Top R&B/Hip-Hop Albums chart. In the United Kingdom, it peaked at number 24 upon its release in April 1992 before quickly falling out of the top 50.

The album has since been certified triple platinum by the Recording Industry Association of America (RIAA) and gold by the Canadian Recording Industry Association (CRIA).

== Awards ==
The Comfort Zone received five Grammy Award nominations: Best R&B Vocal Performance, Female for "Runnin' Back to You" in 1992; Best Pop Vocal Performance, Female, Record of the Year and "Song of the Year" for "Save the Best for Last" and Best R&B Vocal Performance, Female for "The Comfort Zone" in 1993. The album received three nominations at the 1993 American Music Awards, including Favorite Female Artist – Pop/Rock, Favorite Female Artist – Soul/R&B, and Favorite Adult Contemporary Album. Additionally, Williams received two nominations at the 1993 MTV Video Music Awards, including Best Female Video for "Save the Best for Last" and Best Cinematography for "Runnin' Back to You."

Year	Award	Category	Track/album	Result
1992	Grammy Awards	Best Female R&B Vocal Performance	"Runnin' Back to You"	Nominated
1993	Grammy Awards	Record of the Year	"Save the Best for Last"	Nominated
1993	Grammy Awards	Song of the Year	"Save the Best for Last"	Nominated
1993	Grammy Awards	Best Female Pop Vocal Performance	"Save the Best for Last"	Nominated
1993	Grammy Awards	Best Female R&B Vocal Performance	"The Comfort Zone"	Nominated
1993	American Music Awards	Favorite Female Artist – Pop/Rock	"The Comfort Zone"	Nominated
1993	American Music Awards	Favorite Female Artist – Soul/R&B	"The Comfort Zone"	Nominated
1993	American Music Awards	Favorite Adult Contemporary Album	"The Comfort Zone"	Nominated
1993	MTV Video Music Awards	Best Female Video	"Save the Best for Last"	Nominated
1993	MTV Video Music Awards	Best Cinematography	"Running Back to You"	Nominated

== Track listing ==
No.	Title	Writer(s)	Producer(s)	Length
1.	"The Comfort Zone"	Kipper Jones; Reggie Stewart	Gerry Brown; Jones	3:59
2.	"Running Back to You"	Trevor Gale; Kenni Hairston	Bob Rosa; Hairston; DJ L.A. Jay; Rob Von Arx; Gale	4:39
3.	"Work to Do" (featuring Dres)	O'Kelly Isley, Jr.; Ronald Isley; Rudolph Isley; Andres "Dres" Titus	Dr. Jam; Brown; Phase 5; Vanessa Williams	4:36
4.	"You Gotta Go" (featuring Brian McKnight)	Dr. Jam; McKnight; Mark Stevens	McKnight; Dr. Jam; Brown	6:21
5.	"Still in Love"	Derek Bramble	Bramble	5:22
6.	"Save the Best for Last"	Phil Galdston; Jon Lind; Wendy Waldman	Keith Thomas	3:38
7.	"What Will I Tell My Heart?"	Irving Gordon; Jack Lawrence; Peter Tinturin	Brown; Williams	4:17
8.	"Strangers Eyes"	Dr. Jam; Brown; Stevens	Dr. Jam; Brown; Stevens	6:16
9.	"2 of a Kind"	Dr. Jam; Williams	Dr. Jam; Brown; Williams	5:16
10.	"Freedom Dance (Get Free!)"	Jones; Stewart	Bruce Carbone; Dave Darlington; Brown; Jones	4:14
11.	"Just for Tonight"	Thomas; Cynthia Weil	Thomas	4:28
12.	"One Reason"	Thomas; Weil	Thomas	4:52
13.	"Better off Now"	Thomas; Waldman	Thomas	4:14
14.	"Goodbye"	Gary Chapman; Thomas	Thomas	4:21

European edition bonus track
No.	Title	Writer(s)	Producer(s)	Length
15.	"The Right Stuff" (Norman Cook 12″ remix)	Rex Salas; Kipper Jones	Salas; Norman Cook	6:18

Japanese edition bonus track
No.	Title	Writer(s)	Producer(s)	Length
16.	"Running Back to You" (DNA 7″ mix)	Gale; Kenni Hairston	Rosa; Hairston; Jay; Von Arx; Gale; DNA	3:25

The tracks "Work to Do" and "What Will I Tell My Heart?" both appeared in the film Harley Davidson and the Marlboro Man; the latter also appeared on the film's soundtrack album.

== Personnel ==
=== Musicians ===
- Vanessa Williams - vocals
- DJ L.A. Jay, Dr. Jam, Mark Hammond, Harvey Mason - drums
- Dave Darlington, DJ L.A. Jay, Trevor Gale, Kenni Hairston, Mark Hammond, Reggie Stewart, Keith Thomas - drum programming
- D.J. LA Jay, Bob Rosa, Rob Von Arx - "beats"
- Phase 5, Bob Rosa, Rob Von Arx - samples
- Greg Arnold, Derek Bramble, Merv DePyere, DJ L.A. Jay, Dr. Jam, David Frank, Alan Friedman, Trevor Gale, Kenni Hairston, Fred McFarlane, Monty Seward, Keith Thomas - keyboards
- Jorgen Kaufman, Brian McKnight, Randy Waldman - piano
- Stanley Clarke, Fred McFarlane, Cornelius Mims, Jimmie Lee Sloas, Keith Thomas - bass
- David Frank - synthesized bass
- Dann Huff, Paul Jackson, Jr., Jerry McPherson, Wah Wah Watson, Peter "Depete" Meldgaard - guitar
- Jerry McPherson - mandolin
- Gerald Albright, Pete Christlieb, Mark Douthit, Thomas Haas, Scott Mayo - saxophone
- Fernando Pullum - trumpet
- Duane Benjamin - trombone
- Hubert Laws - flute
- The Nashville String Machine - strings
- Horns arranged by Scott Mayo
- Strings arranged by Keith Thomas
- Debbie Cole, Lori Fulton, Vicki Hampton, Kipper Jones, Donna McElroy, Rick Nelson, Valerie Pinkston-Mayo, Angel Rogers, Rocq-E Harrell, Andres "Dres" Vargas-Titus, Tata Vega - backing vocals
- Vocals arranged by Gerry Brown, Kipper Jones, Brian McKnight, Mark Stevens, Keith Thomas and Vanessa Williams

=== Technical ===
- Produced by Vanessa Williams (also executive), Ed Eckstine (executive), Keith Thomas, Brian McKnight, Kenni Hairston, Derek Bramble, Gerry Brown, Bruce Carbone, Dave Darlington, DJ L.A. Jay, Kipper Jones, Phase 5, Mark Stevens and Reggie Stewart
- Engineers – Derek Bramble, Claude Demers, Joe Schiff, Will Schillinger, Allen Sides, Kieran Walsh, Matt Wells, Gerry Brown
- Assistant engineers – Steve Charles, Foley, Roy Gamble, Marty Lester, Todd Moore, Gary Paczosa, Mike Piersante, Brian Soucey
- Mixing – Gerry Brown, Bruce Carbone, Dave Darlington, Humberto Gatica, Bill Whittington, Vanessa L. Williams
- Mix assistants – Jeff Gledt, John Kunz, John David Parker, Brian Soucey
- Mastering – Herb Powers

== Charts ==
=== Weekly charts ===
Weekly chart performance for The Comfort Zone
Chart (1992)	Peak position
Australian Albums (ARIA)	29
Canada Top Albums/CDs (RPM)	24
Dutch Albums (Album Top 100)	28
German Albums (Offizielle Top 100)	52
Japanese Albums (Oricon)	11
Swiss Albums (Schweizer Hitparade)	29
UK Albums (Official Charts)	24
US Billboard 200	17
US Top R&B/Hip-Hop Albums (Billboard)	1

=== Year-end charts ===
1991 year-end chart performance for The Comfort Zone
Chart (1991)	Position
US Top R&B/Hip-Hop Albums (Billboard)	85

1992 year-end chart performance for The Comfort Zone
Chart (1992)	Position
US Billboard 200	45
US Top R&B/Hip-Hop Albums (Billboard)	6

== Certifications ==
Certifications for The Comfort Zone
Region	Certification	Certified units/sales
Canada (Music Canada)	Gold	50,000^{^}
Japan (RIAJ)	Gold	100,000^{^}
United States (RIAA)	3× Platinum	3,000,000^{^}
^{^} Shipments figures based on certification alone.

== See also ==
- List of Billboard number-one R&B albums of 1992
