= 2. OG =

It's Done

Studio album by Overground
- Released: November 8, 2004
- Recorded: 2004
- Genres: Pop; R&B
- Labels: Cheyenne; Polydor; Zeitgeist

Overground chronology
It's Done (2003)	It's Done (2004)

2. OG is the second and last studio album by German boy band Overground. It was released on November 8, 2004, by Cheyenne, Polydor and Zeitgeist.

== Track listing ==
No.	Title	Writer(s)	Producer(s)	Length
1.	"This Is How We Do It" (featuring Montell Jordan)	Oji Pierce; Mark Tabak; Montell Du'Sean Barnett; Ricky Walters	Mark Tabak; Jan van der Toorn; Ismail Boulaghmal
2.	"Freaky"	Tabak; van der Toorn; Boulaghmal	Tabak; van der Toorn; Boulaghmal
3.	"Sex"	Tabak; Boulaghmal; Issa Moussa	Michaels; Dollar; Naja	3:25
4.	"Get Up"	Ismail Boulaghmal; René el Khazraje; Akay Kayed	Tabak; van der Toorn; Boulaghmal
5.	"Aus und vorbei"	Mark Tabak; Deema; Gena Wernik; Kayed; Mark Joker; Okan	Tabak; Wernik
6.	"Never an Easy Way"	Diane Warren	Jonas Jeberg
7.	"Alles"	Tabak; van der Toorn; Lars Severin; Deema; Sven Severin; Boulaghmal	Tabak; van der Toorn; Boulaghmal
8.	"Siesta"	Per Kalenius; Jens Bjurman; Daniel Debourg	Jeberg
9.	"Heute ist dein Tag"	Tabak; Wernik
10.	"Es ist gut so"	Ina Wolf; Martin Frainer; Petra Bonmassar	Frainer; Bonmassar
11.	"Ich frag' mich wie"	Tabak; Deema; Wernik; Kayed; Okan	Tabak; Wernik
12.	"Es tut mir leid"	Tabak; van der Toorn; Lars Severin; Deema; Boulaghmal	Tabak; van der Toorn; Boulaghmal
13.	"Bin für dich da"	Aliani; Boulaghmal; Kayed	Tabak; van der Toorn; Boulaghmal
14.	"This Is How We Do It" (Club Mix)	Pierce; Tabak; Barnett; Walters	Tabak; van der Toorn; Boulaghmal

== Charts ==
Chart (2004)	Peak position
German Albums (Offizielle Top 100)	41
