= The Comfort Zone (song) =

- U.S. 12-inch vinyl single

Single by Vanessa Williams

from the album The Comfort Zone
- Released: October 29, 1991
- Recorded: 1989/1990/1991
- Studio: Sunset Sound Studios (Los Angeles, CA); Hollywood Sound (Los Angeles, CA)
- Genre: R&B
- Length: 3:57
- Label: Wing
- Songwriter(s): Kipper Jones; Reggie Stewart
- Producer(s): Kipper Jones; Gerry Brown

Vanessa Williams singles chronology
"Running Back to You" (1991)	"The Comfort Zone" (1991)	"Save the Best for Last" (1992)

Music video
- "The Comfort Zone" on YouTube

"The Comfort Zone" is a song by American singer and actress Vanessa Williams, released in October 1991 as the second single from her second studio album of the same name (1991). The song peaked at number two on the US Billboard Hot R&B/Hip-Hop Songs chart (behind Shanice's "I Love Your Smile") and was nominated for the 1993 Grammy Award for Best Female R&B Vocal Performance.

In interviews, Williams has stated that she had wanted this to be the lead single from her album but her record company chose "Running Back to You" since it was summer and they wanted an energetic song.

== Critical reception ==
Mike Joyce from The Washington Post described the song as "punchy", viewing it as one of the "more likely candidates for radio exposure".

== Track listing ==
- US 12" single

A1. "The Comfort Zone" (Vanessa's Vibe Mix) (7:33)
A2. "The Comfort Zone" (Comfortable Percapella It's a Late Nite Thing!) (5:29)
B1. "The Comfort Zone" (Frankie's Comfortable Mix) (6:35)
B2. "The Comfort Zone" (Frankie's Comfortable Dub) (6:46)

== Charts ==
=== Weekly charts ===
Chart (1991–1992)	Peak position
US Billboard Hot 100	62
US Dance Club Songs (Billboard)	25
US Dance Singles Sales (Billboard)	1
US Hot R&B/Hip-Hop Songs (Billboard)	2

=== Year-end charts ===
Chart (1992)	Position
US Hot R&B/Hip-Hop Songs (Billboard)	59
