= Sam Watters =

American record producer

- Born: Samuel Joshua Watters; July 23, 1970 (age 56); Camp Springs, Maryland, U.S.
- Origin: San Francisco, California, U.S.
- Genres: Hip hop, R&B, dance, new jack swing, soul
- Occupations: Record producer, songwriter, singer, record executive
- Years active: 1984–present
- Label: Fresh Laundry
- Member of: Color Me Badd

Samuel Joshua Watters (born July 23, 1970) is an American singer, songwriter, record producer and record executive. Watters is a member of the multi-platinum selling 1990s R&B group Color Me Badd and co-authored many of their hits including "I Adore Mi Amor", and "All 4 Love". Watters has also written and produced songs for Grammy-winning and nominated artists such as American Idol winners Fantasia, Kelly Clarkson and Jordin Sparks, and other superstars such as Céline Dion, Whitney Houston, Leona Lewis, and Anastacia. Watters is a member of the production/songwriting team The Runaways including fellow hitmakers Rico Love, Wayne Wilkins, Ryan Tedder, and Louis Biancaniello.

== Music career ==
=== Color Me Badd ===
Watters formed what later would be known as the R&B singing group Color Me Badd in high school along with fellow members Mark Calderon, Kevin Thornton, and Bryan Abrams. After forming, the group was soon discovered by Robert "Kool" Bell of Kool and the Gang fame. Bell introduced them to his management team and the group were soon signed to Giant Records in 1990.

As part of Color Me Badd, Watters and his band mates sold 8.8 million records over their career and had nine Top 40 Hits on the Billboard Hot 100 including three number ones with "I Wanna Sex You Up" (No. 1 Billboard R&B and No. 2 Billboard Hot 100), I Adore Mi Amor" and "All 4 Love". Once Color Me Badd disbanded in 1998, Watters pursued a career in music production and songwriting.

=== Production and songwriting ===
Watters met record producer and songwriter Louis Biancaniello in 1996 while working on Color Me Badd's third album Now and Forever. Watters and Biancaniello soon became production partners and have been writing songs and producing together ever since.

The partners wrote and produced Jessica Simpson's hit "I Wanna Love You Forever," released in September 1999. The platinum single was Simpson's first top ten hit which reached No. 3 on the Billboard Hot 100 chart.

Released in February 1999, the partners produced and co-wrote with Anastacia her debut single "I'm Outta Love," from her album Not That Kind which went on to platinum and multiplatinum status in 10 countries. The single was a hit internationally going Top 5 in 10 countries.

In 2001, Watters produced, co-wrote (with Biancaniello) and sang background vocals (with Mary Griffin) on "What About Love" for the album Bad Girls from Spanish singer Mónica Naranjo.

Watters and Biancaniello produced and co-wrote another single with Anastacia, "One Day in Your Life", released in March 2002. The top ten single charted in 8 other countries. Also released in March 2002 was Celine Dion's multi-platinum album A New Day Has Come. Watters and Biancaniello co-wrote the song "I Surrender" on the album that debuted at No. 1 in over 20 countries. The album went on to sell 12 million copies worldwide.

In June 2004, Watters and Biancaniello co-wrote with Watters' wife and fellow American Idol contestant Tamyra Gray, "I Believe" released by American Idol Season 3 winner Fantasia. The song debuted at the top of the Billboard Hot 100 chart. The single went platinum and won the Billboard Top Selling Single of the Year and Top Selling R&B/Hip-Hop Single of the Year for 2004 and the Billboard American Urban Radio Networks Top Selling R&B/Hip-Hop Single of the Year for 2005.

In 2007, Watters formed the production/songwriting team The Runaways along with Biancaniello, Wayne Wilkins, Rico Love, and Ryan Tedder. Some of the team's hits have included, Natasha Bedingfield's "Love Like This", and Keri Hilson's "Energy".

In April 2007, Watters and Biancaniello wrote and produced another hit single for Fantasia, "When I See U", which spent 8 weeks at No. 1 on the Billboard Hot R&B/Hip-Hop Songs chart. It became the No. 8 song of the decade on the chart, went gold, and was nominated for two Grammy Awards (Best Female R&B Vocal Performance and Best R&B Song).

The Watters and Biancaniello duo also worked on the British singer's Leona Lewis' 2007 debut album, Spirit, which sold 7 million units worldwide. The duo co-wrote and co-produced two songs, "Yesterday" and "Take a Bow" and produced a third, "The First Time Ever I Saw Your Face".

Watters and Biancaniello wrote three songs for Kelly Clarkson's March 2009 studio album All I Ever Wanted: "Whyyawannabringmedown", "The Day We Fell Apart" and the title track "All I Ever Wanted". They also produced a fourth song entitled "I Want You." The album sold over 900,000 copies in the US, debuted at No. 1 on Billboard 200 album chart, and was nominated for a Grammy for Best Pop Vocal Album.

In May 2009, former American Idol winner Jordin Sparks released the single "Battlefield". Watters co-wrote and co-produced the song that reached the top ten of the Billboard Hot 100. Outside of the US, it reached number five in Canada and reached the top ten in Australia, Ireland and New Zealand, and the top twenty in the United Kingdom. With this song Watters assisted the platinum singer in achieving her third top ten Billboard Hot 100 single.

Watters had chart success overseas with the multi-platinum British girl group The Saturdays' "Forever Is Over" which was a No. 2 single on the UK Singles chart. The song was released in October 2009, with Watters co-writing and co-producing the song, along with Biancaniello and others.

Watters followed the success he had overseas with the multi-million selling Irish pop group Westlife in November 2009. Westlife's album Where We Are contained two titles co-produced and co-written by Watters. The album went double platinum in the United Kingdom, triple platinum in Ireland, and gold in New Zealand and Sweden.

From 2014–2016, Watters was VP of Island Records under David Massey where he worked on artists such as Shawn Mendes, Iggy Azalea, Keke Palmer and Luke James.

After leaving Island in 2016, Watters began to manage the artist Lucky Daye, who was nominated for four Grammy Awards in 2020. Watters also manages Bobi Andonov.

== Awards and nominations ==
- Grammy nomination for Best R&B Song for Fantasia's "When I See U" (2008)
- Grammy nomination for Best R&B Vocal Performance – Duo or Group for Color Me Badd's "I Wanna Sex You Up" (1992)
- Grammy nomination for Best New Artist for Color Me Badd (1992)
- American Music Award for Favorite Single – Soul/R&B for Color Me Badd's "I Wanna Sex You Up" (1991)
- Soul Train Music Award for Best RB/Urban Contemporary Single – Group, Band or Duo for Color Me Badd's "I Wanna Sex You Up" (1991)
- Soul Train Music Award for Best RB/Urban Contemporary Song of the Year for Color Me Badd's "I Wanna Sex You Up" (1991)
- American Music Award nomination for Favorite New Artist – Pop / Rock for Color Me Badd (1991)
- American Music Award nomination for Favorite New Artist – Soul / Rhythm & Blues for Color Me Badd (1991)
- American Music Award nomination for Favorite Single – Pop / Rock for Color Me Badd's "I Wanna Sex You Up" (1991)
- American Music Award nomination for Favorite Single – Soul / Rhythm & Blues for Color Me Badd's "I Adore Mi Amor" (1991)
- American Music Award nomination for Favorite Band, Duo or Group – Pop / Rock for Color Me Badd (1991)

== Singles ==
Year	Single	Chart positions										Album
Year	Single	US Hot 100	US Pop	US Dance Club	US R&B	CAN	UK	AUS	EU Hot 100	NZ	IRA	Album
1991	"I Wanna Sex You Up" (Color Me Badd)	2	–	–	1	20	1	4	–	1	9	C.M.B.
1991	"I Adore Mi Amor" (Color Me Badd)	1	–	–	1	–	–	–	–	–	–	C.M.B.
1991	"All 4 Love" (Color Me Badd)	1	–	–	–	–	5	9	–	1	8	C.M.B.
1993	"Time and Chance" (Color Me Badd)	–	–	–	2	–	–	–	–	–	–	Time and Chance
1999	"I Wanna Love You Forever" (Jessica Simpson)	3	–	–	–	9	7	9	6	16	13	Sweet Kisses
1999	"I'm Outta Love" (Anastacia)	92	–	2	–	11	6	1	1	1	2	Not That Kind
2002	"One Day in Your Life" (Anastacia)	–	–	1	–	–	11	6	19	15	15	Freak Of Nature
2004	"I Believe" (Fantasia)	1	12	–	–	1	–	4	–	20	–	Free Yourself
2007	"When I See U" (Fantasia)	32	–	–	1	–	–	–	–	–	–	Fantasia
2009	"Battlefield" (Jordin Sparks)	10	11	–	–	5	11	4	23	3	9	Battlefield
2009	"Forever Is Over" (The Saturdays)	–	–	–	–	–	2	–	8	–	9	Wordshaker
2010	"All Night Long" (Alexandra Burke)	–	–	–	–	–	4	48	14	–	1	Overcome

== Discography ==
Color Me Badd albums

- C.M.B. (1991)
- Time and Chance (1993)
- Now & Forever (1996)
- Awakening (1998)

== Musical Influences ==
Watters has cited diverse singer, songwriter, and producer influences such as Ronald Bell, Narada Michael Walden, Jimmy Jam and Terry Lewis, L.A. Reid & Babyface, David Foster, Miles Foster, Billy Joel, Celine Dion, Bootsy Collins, Howie Tee, and Diane Warren.

== Ventures ==
=== London Police ===
Watters and Biancaniello formed their own record label, London Police, in 2010.
