= Time and Chance (Color Me Badd album) =

Studio album by Color Me Badd
- Released: November 16, 1993
- Recorded: 1992–1993
- Genres: R&B; new jack swing; pop
- Length: 55:30
- Label: Giant Records
- Producers: Color Me Badd, Howie Tee, DJ Pooh, Hamza Lee, Amir Bayyan, Mark Murray, Geoffrey Williams, Jimmy Jam and Terry Lewis, David Foster

Color Me Badd chronology
Young, Gifted & Badd: The Remixes (1992)	Time and Chance (1993)	Now & Forever (1996)

Professional ratings
Review scores
Source	Rating
AllMusic	3/5 stars
Calgary Herald	B
Entertainment Weekly	A−
Billboard	(favorable)
Vibe	Favorable
Los Angeles Times	3/4 stars

Time and Chance is the second studio album by American R&B group Color Me Badd. Released in 1993, the album peaked at No. 56 on the Billboard albums chart. It was released after high-profile appearances on the Beverly Hills 90210 and Mo' Money soundtracks, the latter producing the top 20 single "Forever Love". While eventually reaching gold status, the album was initially considered a disappointment due to the success of their first album. The album received praise from critics and contains two hits in both the lead title track single and the Jimmy Jam & Terry Lewis-produced "Choose". The former's music video was directed by rapper Ice Cube.

== Background ==
The group wanted to make an album tied to more retro genres, that would show their vocal prowess and growth as producers and songwriters, co-writing 11 of the 14 songs, and co-producing 6 songs. The album's production started in late 1992, and before meeting with Giant executives, they started working on the songs, where the first songs that were completed were "Trust Me" and "God Is Love", since the group wanted to go for a more adult sound.

After choosing new producers like David Foster, and the duo Jimmy Jam and Terry Lewis to work on the album, the execs at Giant Records brought in DJ Pooh to have someone "close to the streets" work on the project. They also had some of their prior collaborators like Howie Tee, and Hamza Lee work on the album. Ice Cube was enlisted to direct the music video for the first single, since their A&R team "didn't want the group to come across as too slick. We wanted to send a signal that Color Me Badd is very much a part of the street".

The head of marketing at Giant Records named Steve Backer stated that the label "didn't want to overhype the record. Our approach was to capture a new audience while reclaiming the audience who bought the first album. Our set-up campaign has had a heavy emphasis on retail and press. We've been geared to taking the group back to the street, where the first album took off.".

Listening parties were held in the beginning of October 1993 for key retailers and press, and Giant also did extensive sniping of 15 markets nation-wide, two weeks before the album release. Promotion overseas in Europe and Asia also started in October, where they did television appearances and press for the album. The launch party for the album took place in New York on November 15, 1993, and an appearance on "The Arsenio Hall" to perform the title track took place on November 18, 1993. There were plans for a December 22, 1993, appearance on "The Tonight Show", but it was rescheduled for February 8, 1994.

Despite the promotion of the record, the album would end up underperforming, and not living up to the financial expectations they had, especially compared to the sales of their first album. The group later surmised that the record underperformed due to the mixed signals of the marketing and imagery of the album, as the imagery and photos promoted the group as "hard" and "street", but most of the songs in the album did not reflect what was being marketed. Label founder Irving Azoff commented in 1995 (after the rollout for "Time and Chance" completed) about the poor performance of the urban music division, specifically mentioning "I can't say I'm happy with Color Me Badd's sophomore effort. That's the biggest disappointment."

== Track listing ==
1. "Intro (Ecclesiastes 9:11)" [read by Ossie Davis] – 0:21
2. "Time and Chance" (Color Me Badd, DJ Pooh, Mark Denard) – 4:22
3. "Groovy Now" (Color Me Badd, DJ Pooh) – 4:09
4. "Let Me Have It All" (Sylvester Stewart) – 4:21
5. "Rosanna's Little Sister" (Geoffrey Williams, Chuck Norman) – 3:53
6. "How Deep" (Color Me Badd, Prince, Hamza Lee, Mark Murray) – 4:58
7. "La Tremenda (Intro)" – 0:27
8. "In the Sunshine" (Color Me Badd, Hamza Lee, Howie Tee, Bootsy Collins) – 4:50
9. "Choose" (Color Me Badd, Jimmy Jam & Terry Lewis) – 4:23
10. "The Bells" (Marvin Gaye, Anna Gordy Gaye, Iris Gordy, Elgie Stover) – 3:31
11. "Wildflower" (David Richardson, Douglas Edwards) – 4:35
12. "Livin' Without Her" (Color Me Badd, Hamza Lee) – 4:56
13. "Close to Heaven" (Color Me Badd) – 4:17
14. "Trust Me" (Color Me Badd, Hamza Lee) – 3:57
15. "Let's Start With Forever" (Diane Warren) – 4:26
16. "God Is Love" (Color Me Badd, Ernie Calderon) – 5:12
17. "Let Love Rule" (God Is Love Outro) – 1:38

"Let Me Have It All" is a remake of the Sly & the Family Stone song featured on the 1973 album Fresh.

"The Bells" is a remake of The Originals' song featured on the 1970 album The Portrait of the Originals, written, in part, by Marvin Gaye and his wife Anna Gordy Gaye.

"Wildflower" is a remake of the Skylark song originally released in 1973.

== Singles ==
1. "Time and Chance" – December 9, 1993
2. "Choose" – February 3, 1994
3. "The Bells" – April 7, 1994
4. "Let's Start with Forever" – April 14, 1994

First single "Time and Chance" spent 19 weeks on the US Billboard Hot 100 with a peak position of 23. Second single "Choose" spent 17 weeks on the Hot 100 with a peak position of 23 as well. The third and fourth singles failed to make the chart.

== Charts ==
=== Weekly charts ===
Chart (1993)	Peak position
Australian Albums (ARIA)	110
US Billboard 200	56
US Top R&B/Hip-Hop Albums (Billboard)	20

=== Year-end charts ===
Chart (1994)	Position
US Top R&B/Hip-Hop Albums (Billboard)	94

== Certifications ==
Region	Certification	Certified units/sales
United States (RIAA)	Gold	500,000^{^}
^{^} Shipments figures based on certification alone.
