= The Triplets (band) =

Latin pop group

- Genres: Adult contemporary; Latin
- Years active: 1984–present
- Labels: Elektra Records, independent
- Members: Diana Villegas; Sylvia Villegas; Vicky Villegas
- Website: www.thetripletsband.com

The Triplets are a pop rock band that crossed over musical boundaries from the U.S. through Latin America. Composed of the triplets Diana, Sylvia, and Vicky Villegas (all born April 18, 1965) of an American mother and a Mexican father, the group recorded in both English and Spanish. They first gained recognition after winning the finals of the third edition of MTV's Basement Tapes competition in November 1984 for the song "Boys", and were awarded a contract with Elektra Records and released their first EP "Break the Silence" in January 1986.

They scored a hit single on the U.S. Billboard Hot 100 chart in 1991 with "You Don't Have to Go Home Tonight" as well as on the Adult Contemporary Chart with "Sunrise". They released a VHS tape in 1991 as well. Subsequent hits followed on the Billboard Latin charts. On September 9, 2015, the band announced they were reuniting and releasing a new CD entitled "Independence Road." The album was released in September 2016 with Sylvia and Vicky performing and Diana writing songs.

Musical awards and nominations included a Grammy Award nomination for Best Latin Performance (1993), an American Music Award nomination for best new group (1991), a New York Music Award for best new group (1991), and the Desy Award for best new Latin group (1991).

== Discography ==
=== Albums ===
- Break the Silence (Elektra Records, 1986)
- Thicker Than Water (Mercury, 1991; Billboard 200 peak #125)
- Fuerza del Parentesco (Mercury Records, 1991 - Spanish version of Thicker Than Water)
- Algo Mas Que Amor (Capitol/EMI Latin, 1993)
- Independence Road (Various Artists Records, September 26, 2016)

=== Singles ===
List of singles, with selected chart positions
Title	Year	Peak chart positions			
Title	Year	US	US AC	US Latin	AUS
"Boys"	1986	—	—	—	—
"Translate"	1986	—	—	—	—
"You Don't Have to Go Home Tonight"	1991	14	25	—	45
"Sunrise"	1991	—	16	—	—
"Light a Candle"	1991	—	35	—	—
"Sombras y Silencios"	1991	—	—	—	—
"Algo Mas Que Amor (I've Been Waiting for You)"	1993	—	—	2	—
"Mi Mundo Entero (Everything I Own)"	1994	—	—	27	—
"Las Llaves de Mi Corazon"	1994	—	—	14	—
"Independence Road"	2016	—	—	—	—
