= Forever Love (Color Me Badd song) =

Single by Color Me Badd

from the album Mo' Money and Young, Gifted & Badd: The Remixes
- B-side: "Roll the Dice"
- Released: November 24, 1992
- Genre: R&B, pop, soul
- Length: 5:10 (album version); 4:29 (radio edit)
- Label: Giant/Perspective
- Songwriters: Color Me Badd, James Harris III, Terry Lewis
- Producers: Color Me Badd, James Harris III, Terry Lewis

Color Me Badd singles chronology
"Slow Motion" (1992)	"Forever Love" (1992)	"Time and Chance" (1993)

"Forever Love" is a song performed by American R&B group Color Me Badd. The song was written and produced by the group along with Jimmy Jam and Terry Lewis, and it appears on the soundtrack to the film Mo' Money. The song was released on November 24, 1992, as the soundtrack's seventh and final single by Perspective Records. It is also included on the group's remix album Young, Gifted & Badd and peaked at number 15 on the US Billboard Hot 100 in 1992. It was their final top 20 single on the Hot 100.

== Music video ==
The official music video for the song was directed by German director Marcus Nispel., who also directed the video for "Thinkin' Back". Like the latter, the video is also filmed in black and white.

== Critical reception ==
Larry Flick from Billboard magazine wrote, "This tender-hearted pop ballad, laced with lush harmonies and soft percussion, should net high marks at adult-leaning top 40, urban, and AC outlets. Easy-listening, melodic fare is tailor-made for quartet's increasingly ardent audience.

== Charts ==
Chart (1992)	Peak position
Australia (ARIA)	91
Israel (Israeli Singles Chart)	29
US Billboard Hot 100	15
US Rhythmic Top 40 (Billboard)	8
US Top 40 Mainstream (Billboard)	16
US Cash Box Top 100	14
Zimbabwe (ZIMA)	14
