= All 4 Love =

1991 single by Color Me Badd

Single by Color Me Badd

from the album C.M.B.
- B-side: "Color Me Badd"
- Released: July 22, 1991
- Length: 3:30
- Label: Giant; Reprise
- Songwriters: Bryan Abrams; Mark Calderon; Steve Cropper; Isaac Hayes; Howard Thompson; Kevin Thornton; Sam Watters
- Producer: Howie Tee

Color Me Badd singles chronology
"I Adore Mi Amor" (1991)	"All 4 Love" (1991)	"Color Me Badd" (1991)

"All 4 Love" is a song by American music group Color Me Badd. Outside North America, it was released as second single from their debut album, C.M.B. (1991), while in the United States and Canada, it served as the third single. The recording was produced by Howie Tee and contains elements from the 1966 song "Patch My Heart" by the Mad Lads.

On the US Billboard Hot 100, the song reached number one on January 25, 1992; it was the band's second and final number-one single in the US. The song also reached number two on the US Cash Box Top 100 and topped the New Zealand Singles Chart. It additionally became a top-10 hit in several other countries.

== Track listings ==
- Single
1. "All 4 Love" (album version) – 3:30
2. "Color Me Badd" – 4:05
- Maxi-CD
1. "All 4 Love" (album mix) – 3:29
2. "All 4 Love" (All 4 Street Mix with rap) – 3:47
3. "All 4 Love" (Red Hot mix) – 3:48
4. "All 4 Love" (All 4 Street Mix without rap) – 3:47

== Charts ==
=== Weekly charts ===
Chart (1991–1992)	Peak position
Australia (ARIA)	9
Belgium (Ultratop 50 Flanders)	6
Canada Top Singles (RPM)	8
Europe (Eurochart Hot 100)	10
Europe (European Dance Radio)	18
Europe (European Hit Radio)	4
Finland (Suomen virallinen lista)	12
Germany (GfK)	23
Ireland (IRMA)	8
Israel (Israeli Singles Chart)	6
Luxembourg (Radio Luxembourg)	4
Netherlands (Dutch Top 40)	2
Netherlands (Single Top 100)	3
New Zealand (Recorded Music NZ)	1
Spain Airplay (Top 40 Radio)	38
Sweden (Sverigetopplistan)	25
UK Singles (Official Charts)	5
UK Airplay (Music Week)	5
UK Dance (Music Week)	17
UK Club Chart (Record Mirror)	46
US Billboard Hot 100	1
US Cash Box Top 100	2
Zimbabwe (ZIMA)	1

=== Year-end charts ===
Chart (1991)	Position
Australia (ARIA)	79
Belgium (Ultratop)	73
Europe (Eurochart Hot 100)	92
Europe (European Hit Radio)	51
Netherlands (Dutch Top 40)	28
Netherlands (Single Top 100)	31
New Zealand (RIANZ)	16
UK Singles (OCC)	45

Chart (1992)	Position
Canada Top Singles (RPM)	76
US Billboard Hot 100	9
US Cash Box Top 100	24

=== Decade-end charts ===
Chart (1990–1999)	Position
US Billboard Hot 100	94

== Certifications ==
Region	Certification	Certified units/sales
Australia (ARIA)	Gold	35,000^{^}
New Zealand (RMNZ)	Gold	15,000^{‡}
United States (RIAA)	Gold	500,000^{^}
^{^} Shipments figures based on certification alone.^{‡} Sales+streaming figures based on certification alone.

== Release history ==
Region	Date	Format(s)	Label(s)	Ref.
United Kingdom	July 22, 1991	7-inch vinyl; 12-inch vinyl; CD; cassette	Giant; Reprise	
Australia	September 16, 1991	Cassette	Reprise	
Australia	September 30, 1991	12-inch vinyl; CD	Reprise	
United States	November 7, 1991	Cassette	Giant; Reprise	

== See also ==
- List of number-one singles in 1991 (NZ)
- Hot 100 number-one hits of 1992 (United States)
