= I Adore Mi Amor =

1991 single by Color Me Badd

Single by Color Me Badd

from the album C.M.B.
- B-side: "I Wanna Sex You Up"
- Released: July 11, 1991
- Genre: R&B
- Length: 4:49
- Label: Giant; Reprise
- Songwriters: Hamza Lee; Color Me Badd
- Producers: Hamza Lee; Royal Bayyan

Color Me Badd singles chronology
"I Wanna Sex You Up" (1991)	"I Adore Mi Amor" (1991)	"All 4 Love" (1991)

Music video
- "I Adore Mi Amor" on YouTube

"I Adore Mi Amor" is a song by American R&B group Color Me Badd, released by Giant Records as the second single (third outside North America) from their debut album, C.M.B. (1991). The song peaked at number one on the US Billboard Hot 100 chart for two weeks and spent 20 weeks on the listing, finishing 1991 at number 18 on the Billboard year-end chart. Worldwide, the track entered the top 20 in Canada, the Netherlands, and New Zealand. In 1992, saxophonist Najee covered the song from the album Just an Illusion.

== Track listing ==
- US 12-inch single
1. "I Adore Mi Amor" (U.S.A. mix) – 4:52
2. "I Adore Mi Amor" (Round the Way mix) – 4:27
3. "I Adore Mi Amor" (international mix) – 4:49
4. "I Adore Mi Amor" (T.V. mix) – 4:26

== Charts ==
=== Weekly charts ===
Chart (1991)	Peak position
Australia (ARIA)	27
Belgium (Ultratop 50 Flanders)	25
Canada Top Singles (RPM)	8
Europe (Eurochart Hot 100)	69
Europe (European Hit Radio)	13
France Airplay (SNEP)	22
Germany (GfK)	44
Ireland (IRMA)	14
Israel (IBA)	22
Luxembourg (Radio Luxembourg)	4
Netherlands (Dutch Top 40)	10
Netherlands (Single Top 100)	11
New Zealand (Recorded Music NZ)	8
Spain Airplay (Top 40 Radio)	25
UK Singles (Official Charts)	44
UK Airplay (Music Week)	17
UK Dance (Music Week)	56
US Billboard Hot 100	1
US 12-inch Singles Sales (Billboard)	21
US Hot R&B Singles (Billboard)	1
US Cash Box Top 100	1
Zimbabwe (ZIMA)	6

=== Year-end charts ===
Chart (1991)	Position
Brazil (Crowley)	48
Canada Top Singles (RPM)	83
US Billboard Hot 100	18
US Cash Box Top 100	12

== Certifications ==
Region	Certification	Certified units/sales
United States (RIAA)	Gold	500,000^{^}
^{^} Shipments figures based on certification alone.

== Release history ==
Region	Date	Format(s)	Label(s)	Ref.
United States	July 11, 1991	7-inch vinyl; 12-inch vinyl; CD; cassette	Giant; Reprise	
United Kingdom	September 30, 1991	7-inch vinyl; 12-inch vinyl; CD; cassette	Giant; Reprise	
Australia	January 13, 1992	12-inch vinyl; CD; cassette	Reprise	

== See also ==
- Hot 100 number-one hits of 1991 (United States)
- List of number-one R&B singles of 1991 (U.S.)
