= Color Me Badd =

American R&B group

Background information
- Also known as: C.M.B.
- Origin: Oklahoma City, Oklahoma, U.S.
- Genres: R&B; pop; new jack swing
- Years active: 1985–1998; 2010–2019; 2022–present
- Labels: Epic, Giant
- Members: Mark Calderon; Kris "$iyaStylz" Campbell; Erick "Eion" Footman
- Past members: Sam Watters; Kevin "K.T." Thornton; Bryan Abrams; Adam Emil; Martin Kember
- Website: colormebadd.com

Color Me Badd is an American R&B group formed in 1985 in Oklahoma City, Oklahoma, by Bryan Abrams, Mark Calderon, Sam Watters and Kevin Thornton. Color Me Badd broke up in 1998 before reuniting in 2010, with various lineups since.

Best known for their singles "I Wanna Sex You Up", "I Adore Mi Amor", "All 4 Love", "Choose", and "The Earth, The Sun", The Rain; the group has sold over 15 million records worldwide, had two number one hit singles, nine top 40 hits, 12 top 100 hits and three platinum or better albums. They were nominated for two Grammy Awards, won two Soul Train Music Awards and one American Music Award, and were nominated for five others. Their songs have been featured in films and television programs including New Jack City, Mo' Money, No Strings Attached, and Glee. They made a cameo appearance as themselves on a 1992 episode of Beverly Hills, 90210.

== History ==
=== 1985–1990: Formation ===
Thornton and Abrams became friends in junior high school, and Watters and Calderon became friends in grade school. The four met in the mid-1980s while attending Northwest Classen High School in Oklahoma City. They were all members of the school choir. The group originally formed in 1985 as Take One but changed their name to Color Me Badd to avoid confusion with an a cappella band named Take 6. Watters selected the name after a horse at the racetrack named Color Me Bad. They aimed to be a vocal group in the vein of New Edition and New Kids on the Block. They first performed together in a school talent show, influenced by doo-wop a cappella groups of the past, such as Sam Cooke, The Temptations, and the Four Tops.

The group came up with a plan to spontaneously audition for any big-name acts playing in Oklahoma City. They met Robert Bell of Kool & the Gang on May 27, 1987, when he was in Oklahoma City for a performance. They auditioned for him, and he introduced them to his then-road manager, Adil Bayyan, who would become Color Me Badd's manager and convince them to move to New York City to pursue a record deal. They also sang for Huey Lewis and the News, Sheila E., and Ronnie Milsap, and opened for Tony! Toni! Toné! in Oklahoma City in 1988. One afternoon in 1989, Thornton saw Jon Bon Jovi in a movie theater and called the other band members to join him. They waited for Bon Jovi to leave the theater and then sang the 1961 doo-wop hit "Daddy's Home" a cappella for him. Bon Jovi invited them to be his band's opening act the following night, performing in front of 20,000 audience members.

They moved to New York City on September 23, 1989. In 1990, they bumped into Tony! Toni! Toné!, who got them into the ASCAP Music Awards. There, Color Me Badd approached producers Jimmy Jam and Terry Lewis and started singing for them. The producers advised that, being a multicultural group, they write a half-English, half-Spanish song. They wrote "I Adore Mi Amor" back in Oklahoma City with their producer and friend Hamza Lee. Giant Records executive Cassandra Mills heard a tape of the band singing the song, and they signed with Giant on August 11, 1990.

=== 1991–1992: C.M.B. ===
After signing with the group, Mills asked producer Dr. Freeze for a song for Color Me Badd to record for the New Jack City soundtrack, similar to "Do Me!" by Bell Biv DeVoe. Freeze offered "I Wanna Sex You Up," which would become Color Me Badd's debut single, released on March 2, 1991. The song was not originally intended to be a single and had been turned down by other acts including Bell Biv DeVoe, Keith Sweat, and Christopher Williams. The biggest hit on the New Jack City soundtrack, it peaked at number 2 on the Billboard Hot 100 and hit number 1 on the Hot R&B/Hip-Hop Songs chart. Due to the song's popularity, Giant Records wanted Color Me Badd to quickly record an album. At the time, they only had four or five finished songs. They were flown out to Los Angeles to work in the studio, recording the album in two or three weeks.

Their debut album, C.M.B., was released on July 23, 1991. It went on to sell over 9 million copies worldwide and became certified triple platinum (6x Platinum as of 2025) in the U.S., spending 77 weeks on the Billboard 200, peaking at number 3. "I Wanna Sex You Up" was included on the album. The follow-up single "I Adore Mi Amor" hit number 1 on the Hot 100 and on the Hot R&B/Hip-Hop Songs charts, "All 4 Love" hit number 1 on the Hot 100, "Thinkin Back" reached number 16 on the Hot 100 and number 31 on the Hot R&B/Hip-Hop Songs chart, and "Slow Motion" reached number 18 on the Hot 100.

Color Me Badd performed at the 1991 Smash Hits Poll Winners' Awards in the United Kingdom, winning the Best New Group trophy. They won Best R&B/Soul Single and R&B/Soul Song of the Year in the Group, Band, or Duo categories for “I Wanna Sex You Up” at the sixth annual Soul Train Music Awards. They were nominated for Best New Artist and Best R&B Performance by a Duo or Group with Vocal ("I Wanna Sex You Up") at the 1992 Grammy Awards. They won Favorite Soul/R&B Single at the 1992 American Music Awards for "I Wanna Sex You Up" and were also nominated in that category for "I Adore Mi Amor." They were additionally nominated for Favorite Pop/Rock Band/Duo/Group, Favorite Pop/Rock Single, Favorite Pop/Rock New Artist, and Favorite Soul/R&B New Artist at the 1992 American Music Awards. Color Me Badd opened for Paula Abdul on her 1991 tour, performing some of their set a cappella. The New York Times described the group as "somewhere between George Michael's pop-soul and the group dynamics of The Temptations." At halftime of Super Bowl XXVI between the Washington Redskins and Buffalo Bills on January 26, 1992, the group performed "I Wanna Sex You Up" on In Living Color as part of Fox's counterprogramming special live-from-Hollywood football-themed edition of the show.

The group made a cameo appearance on a 1992 episode of Beverly Hills, 90210 (season two, episode 26). The episode revolved around Color Me Badd, beginning with a clip from the "I Adore Mi Amor" music video. Later in the episode, the 90210 gang stakes out the Bel Age Hotel in hopes of meeting the group, and Kelly visits their penthouse suite. She invites them to join her at the Peach Pit, where they serenade the gang a cappella.

On November 24, 1992, Color Me Badd released a remix album entitled Young, Gifted & Badd: The Remixes. It contained the single "Forever Love," which reached number 15 on the Hot 100 and was also featured on the Mo' Money soundtrack. The remix album peaked at number 189 on the Billboard 200.

=== 1993–1995: Time and Chance ===
Color Me Badd's second studio album, Time and Chance, was released in November 1993. An ambitious project featuring 19 new tracks, the album marked a shift in musical style for the group. Working with producers including David Foster, DJ Pooh, and Jimmy Jam and Terry Lewis, it was more soulful and funky than their previous work but lacked a cohesive sound. With the music industry at the time embracing grunge music and West Coast hip hop, it was difficult for Color Me Badd to achieve the same success on the singles charts as before, and the group began to lose momentum.

The album peaked at number 56 on the Billboard 200, spending 17 weeks on the chart and eventually going double platinum. Ice Cube directed the music video for the lead single, the title track "Time and Chance," which peaked at number 23 on the Hot 100 and number 9 on the Hot R&B/Hip-Hop Songs charts. The follow-up single, "Choose," also peaked at number 23 on the Hot 100.

=== 1996–1998: Later albums and breakup ===
The group re-emerged in 1996 with their third studio album, Now & Forever. Producers included Narada Michael Walden, Babyface, Jon B., and Boyz II Men's Nathan Morris. Now & Forever reached number 113 on the Billboard 200, spending 14 weeks on the chart and eventually going platinum. It reached number 1 in Japan. The album produced one hit single, "The Earth, the Sun, the Rain," which peaked at number 21 on the Hot 100, remaining on the chart for 22 weeks, and reached number 69 on the Hot R&B/Hip-Hop Songs chart. The second single, "Sexual Capacity," produced and co-written by Robin Thicke under the name Rob Thicke, was a minor hit, getting heavy radio airplay on Urban AC stations such as WAMO in Pittsburgh and WHUR in Washington D.C. throughout 1996 and appearing on the soundtrack to the Demi Moore film Striptease. Album sales for Now & Forever were not as strong as their previous albums, and the group was released from their contract with Giant to sign with Epic Records.

After moving to Epic (under Sony Music Entertainment), Color Me Badd's fourth studio album, Awakening, was released on July 28, 1998. Under Sony head Tommy Mottola, the label chose "Remember When" as the album's lead single, which Abrams and Calderon objected to. The song peaked at number 48 on the Hot 100. Around this time, Abrams had developed an alcohol problem, and the group was beginning to fall apart. The newly married Thornton decided to leave the band to pursue a religious ministry, and Watters wanted to go off on his own to write and produce. With Abrams and Calderon the only remaining members, the group split up.

=== 1998–2010: Solo years ===
Kevin Thornton left the group in October 1998 to pursue a Christian ministry. He became a licensed minister and has since served as an evangelist, youth pastor, and worship leader at his home church, Without Walls Church, in Fort Worth, Texas. He operates Kevin Thornton Ministries in Texas. In 2008, he released a solo album, Conversions, blending contemporary hip-hop/rap with gospel and soul music.

Sam Watters pursued a career as a record producer, achieving success producing for Jessica Simpson, Celine Dion, Fantasia, Anastacia, Natasha Bedingfield, Kelly Clarkson, 98 Degrees, Blake Lewis, and others. Watters is a member of the production/songwriting team The Runaways, which also includes Rico Love, Wayne Wilkins, Ryan Tedder, and Louis Biancaniello. He married R&B singer and former American Idol contestant Tamyra Gray in 2006.

Mark Calderon worked with artists such as Stevie Brock, whose 2002 remake of "All 4 Love" reached number 1 on the Disney charts; and with IPV, who is signed with Wright Entertainment and had songs played on the television series House and Knight Rider. Calderon married Color Me Badd’s former stylist Lisa Smedley in 1992. They have two children.

In 2001, Bryan Abrams released a solo album entitled Welcome to Me. In 2007, he co-starred on the VH1 reality TV series Mission: Man Band, which also included former boy band members Jeff Timmons of 98 Degrees, Chris Kirkpatrick of *NSYNC, and Rich Cronin of LFO. The show documented the former boy band members' attempt to create a new group while living together. Mission: Man Band was ultimately canceled after seven episodes. In 2007, after being approached by Violent J and Shaggy 2 Dope, Abrams co-wrote and recorded an appearance on the Insane Clown Posse song "Truth Dare," which was released on the compilations Psychopathics from Outer Space 3 (2007) and Featuring Freshness (2011). In 2010, Abrams wrote three songs for Kool & the Gang, singing lead on all three tracks.

On August 22, 2000, Giant Records released the compilation album The Best of Color Me Badd.

=== 2010–present: Reunion ===
In July 2010, Color Me Badd re-emerged as a duo consisting of Bryan Abrams and Mark Calderon. They headlined a concert in Hawaii, which also featured All-4-One and Shai. Later that year, Kevin Thornton rejoined Color Me Badd. In early 2012, Calderon and Abrams collaborated with the Insane Clown Posse on the song "Ghetto Rainbows (Soft Ass R-N-B Remix)" on The Mighty Death Pop! bonus CD called Mike E. Clark's Extra Pop Emporium. Credited to Insane Clown Posse and Color Me Badd, the song features Abrams and Calderon and was also co-written by the duo. In June 2013, the group released "Skywalkin'," their first new song in nearly 15 years. On August 16, 2013, Abrams announced his departure from Color Me Badd through a post on his website. The group continued with Calderon and Thornton. Abrams was replaced by Martin Kember. Color Me Badd performed with the lineup of Calderon, Thornton, and Kember at the 2014 BET Awards.

In 2015, Abrams and Calderon reunited as Color Me Badd, without Thornton and Kember, and began a tour in Singapore. Thornton briefly rejoined Color Me Badd in 2015 before leaving the group that same year. In the winter of 2015, Adam Emil joined the group, and they went on a US tour with Bell Biv DeVoe. By 2016, the group was officially a trio, consisting of Calderon, Abrams, and Emil. That year, they recorded a new song, "In Case You Didn't Know". On April 30, 2016, Color Me Badd played a concert for the U.S. Armed Forces at Okuma Beach, Okinawa, Japan. In the fall and winter of 2016, Color Me Badd was on the inaugural I Love the ‘90s Tour, a year-long tour across the US that also featured Vanilla Ice, Salt-N-Pepa, Tone Loc, and Young MC.

On July 22, 2018, Abrams was arrested for assaulting Calderon on stage during a concert in Waterloo, New York. A video shows Abrams walking across the stage at the completion of the song "I Wanna Sex You Up" and firmly shoving Calderon to the floor. Abrams allegedly screamed, “I’m motherfucking Color Me Badd!” as he pushed Calderon to the floor. Officers stated that alcohol may have been a factor. In 2019, Abrams, along with his wife Kim and bandmate Calderon, appeared on The Dr. Phil talk show to discuss the events surrounding the incident, as well as Abrams's past addictions, arrests, and relationship issues. The two were interviewed separately due to the restraining order filed after the event, even though Abrams admitted that contractually they still performed together after the fact but stated that it felt painful that they never exchanged words other than sharing the stage professionally.

On August 31, 2019, Color Me Badd performed at a Beverly Hills, 90210 charity event to benefit Generosity Water, organized by Brian Austin Green and his podcast cohost Derek Russell.

== Legacy ==
Along with Boyz II Men, Hi-Five, Shai, Silk, and All-4-One, Color Me Badd were considered the leaders of a resurgence of post-doo-wop harmony group singing in the early 1990s. Color Me Badd invented the term "hip-hop doo-wop" to describe their sound, which combines four-part pop-soul harmonies with a hip-hop influence. In the 1990s, they were known for wearing bright-colored suits and for their choreography, as well as for being a racially diverse group, which was rare at the time. Calderon is Latino, Abrams is white and Native American, Watters is white, and Thornton is black. The group was inducted into the Oklahoma Music Hall of Fame in 2000.

Color Me Badd has had a lasting influence on R&B music. The Justin Timberlake and Andy Samberg Saturday Night Live Digital Short "Dick in a Box", which debuted on December 16, 2006, is a parody of early 1990s R&B and is considered a spoof of the style of Color Me Badd in particular. "I Wanna Sex You Up" was performed by cast members on an episode of the first season of Glee in 2009. The music video for "I Wanna Sex You Up" was featured on an episode of Beavis and Butthead on MTV. The song has appeared in numerous films and television shows, including New Jack City, You Don't Mess with the Zohan, and No Strings Attached. On a November 2015 episode of Jimmy Kimmel Live!, Color Me Badd's Abrams, Calderon, and Watters joined country singer Brad Paisley in a performance of "I Wanna Sex You Up" for Kimmel's "Mash-Up Monday" series. The artists were renamed Color Me Bradd for the occasion.

== Discography ==
Studio albums

- C.M.B. (1991)
- Time and Chance (1993)
- Now & Forever (1996)
- Awakening (1998)

== Awards ==
Year	Nominee / work	Award	Result
1992	Color Me Badd	Grammy Award for Best New Artist	Nominated
1992	"I Wanna Sex You Up"	Grammy Award for Best R&B Performance by a Duo or Group with Vocal	Nominated
1992	"I Wanna Sex You Up"	Soul Train Music Award for Best R&B/Soul Single – Group, Band or Duo	Won
1992	"I Wanna Sex You Up"	Soul Train Music Award for R&B/Soul Song of the Year	Won
1992	"I Wanna Sex You Up"	American Music Award for Favorite Soul/R&B Single	Won
1992	"I Adore Mi Amor"	American Music Award for Favorite Soul/R&B Single	Nominated
1992	Color Me Badd	American Music Award for Favorite Soul/R&B New Artist	Nominated
1992	Color Me Badd	American Music Award for Favorite Pop/Rock Band/Duo/Group	Nominated
1992	"I Wanna Sex You Up"	American Music Award for Favorite Pop/Rock Single	Nominated
1992	Color Me Badd	American Music Award for Favorite Pop/Rock New Artist	Nominated
