= I Wanna Sex You Up =

1991 single by Color Me Badd

Single by Color Me Badd

from the album C.M.B. and New Jack City (soundtrack)
- Released: March 7, 1991
- Genre: New jack swing; R&B; doo-wop; hip hop
- Length: 4:06
- Label: Giant; Reprise
- Songwriters: Elliot Straite; Color Me Badd
- Producer: Dr. Freeze

Color Me Badd singles chronology
"I Wanna Sex You Up" (1991)	"I Adore Mi Amor" (1991)

Music video
- "I Wanna Sex You Up" on YouTube

"I Wanna Sex You Up" is a song by American R&B group Color Me Badd, released in March 1991 as the lead single from their debut album, C.M.B. (1991). The song was produced by Dr. Freeze and was also featured on the soundtrack to the 1991 film New Jack City, starring Wesley Snipes, Ice-T, Chris Rock and Judd Nelson. The song heavily samples "Tonight Is the Night" by Betty Wright.

The single, released by Giant and Reprise Records, achieved commercial success in the United States, spending four weeks at number two on the Billboard Hot 100 and topping both the Billboard Hot R&B Singles and 12-inch Singles Sales charts. "I Wanna Sex You Up" also experienced international success, peaking atop the charts of New Zealand and the United Kingdom. The accompanying music video was directed by American director Lionel C. Martin.

== Critical reception ==
A reviewer from Cash Box magazine described the song as "naughty and suggestive yet not particularly explicit R&B/pop". Arion Berger from Entertainment Weekly complimented it as "irresistible". Dennis Hunt from Los Angeles Times found that all it "has going for it is sexy lyrics." James Hamilton from Music Week's RM Dance Update called it a "sweetly cooing young guys crooned gorgeous sineous sexy swayer" in his weekly dance column. Stephen Holden from New York Times wrote, "'I Wanna Sex You Up' has a loping pop Latin beat that is similar to the Young Rascals' 'Groovin'' and Laura Nyro's 'Stoned Soul Picnic', and a piercing lead vocal by Bryan Abrams, whose voice resembles that of the late-1960's Stevie Wonder." David Fricke from Rolling Stone declared it as "a crafty blend of doo-wop doo-wah and hip-hop clatter so irresistible it makes you willing to forgive the utter banality of the lyrics." Mark Frith from Smash Hits felt that Color Me Badd "sound excellent" when "they do manage to break into a sweat", like on "I Wanna Sex You Up".

=== Retrospective response ===
Alex Henderson from AllMusic named the song as one of the "moments" on the C.M.B. album, describing it as a slow jam which samples rapper Slick Rick "in a rather clever fashion". "I Wanna Sex You Up" was ranked number 40 on Blender's list of the "50 Worst Songs Ever" and VH1's "100 Greatest Songs of the '90s". In a 2017 retrospective review, Pop Rescue commented, "This song stood out from the rest of the charts when it was released in the UK, and that along with the boys’ breathy sexy promises and the inclusion of ‘sex’ in the song title made this track a sure-fire hit. Musically it's quite a simple song, allowing the vocals to really shine here – and to their credit, their vocals worth together really well." In 2026, Billboard magazine ranked "I Wanna Sex You Up" number 19 in their list of "The Biggest No. 2 Hot 100 Hits of All Time", noting that the song had peaked at number two, just behind Extreme's "More Than Words" and Paula Abdul's "Rush Rush".

== Chart performance ==
The song spent three weeks at number one on the UK Singles Chart and reached number two for four consecutive weeks on the US Billboard Hot 100. It was the 10th-best-selling single of 1991 in the UK and the second-best-selling single of the year in the US. In 1992 the song won the group a Soul Train Music Award for Best R&B/Soul Single, Group, Band or Duo and Soul Train Music Award for Best R&B/Soul Song of the Year.

== Track listings ==
- 7-inch single
1. "I Wanna Sex You Up" (Master mix) – 4:05
2. "I Wanna Sex You Up" (Smoothed Out mix) – 3:38
- 12-inch maxi
1. "I Wanna Sex You Up" (Smoothed Out mix) – 3:38
2. "I Wanna Sex You Up" (Smoothed Out—long version) – 5:13
3. "I Wanna Sex You Up" (instrumental) – 4:04
4. "I Wanna Sex You Up" (Master mix) – 4:05
5. "I Wanna Sex You Up" (Freeze mix) – 4:06
- CD single
1. "I Wanna Sex You Up" (Master mix) – 4:06
2. "I Wanna Sex You Up" (Smoothed Out mix / long version) – 5:13
3. "I Wanna Sex You Up" (Freeze mix) – 4:07
4. "I Wanna Sex You Up" (instrumental) – 4:04
- CD maxi
1. "I Wanna Sex You Up" (Smoothed Out mix) – 3:39
2. "I Wanna Sex You Up" (Smoothed Out mix—long version) – 5:14
3. "I Wanna Sex You Up" (instrumental) – 4:04
4. "I Wanna Sex You Up" (Master mix) – 4:05
5. "I Wanna Sex You Up" (Freeze mix) – 4:07
- Cassette
1. "I Wanna Sex You Up" (Master mix)
2. "I Wanna Sex You Up" (Smoothed Out mix)
3. "I Wanna Sex You Up" (Master mix)
4. "I Wanna Sex You Up" (Smoothed Out mix)

== Personnel ==
- Co-production : Howie Tee, Spyderman
- Engineering : Angela Piva, Warren Woods
- Mastering: Eddy Schreyer
- Mixing: Dr. Freeze, Howie Tee
- Production : Dr. Freeze

== Charts ==
=== Weekly charts ===
Chart (1991)	Peak position
Australia (ARIA)	4
Austria (Ö3 Austria Top 40)	11
Belgium (Ultratop 50 Flanders)	4
Canada Top Singles (RPM)	18
Canada Dance/Urban (RPM)	3
Denmark (IFPI)	4
Europe (Eurochart Hot 100)	5
Europe (European Hit Radio)	4
Finland (Suomen virallinen lista)	27
France (SNEP)	20
France Airplay (SNEP)	3
Germany (GfK)	4
Ireland (IRMA)	9
Israel (Israeli Singles Chart)	8
Luxembourg (Radio Luxembourg)	2
Netherlands (Dutch Top 40)	2
Netherlands (Single Top 100)	2
New Zealand (Recorded Music NZ)	1
Norway (VG-lista)	5
Spain Airplay (Top 40 Radio)	38
Sweden (Sverigetopplistan)	5
Switzerland (Schweizer Hitparade)	7
UK Singles (Official Charts)	1
UK Airplay (Music Week)	7
UK Dance (Music Week)	1
UK Club Chart (Record Mirror)	1
US Billboard Hot 100	2
US 12-inch Singles Sales (Billboard)	1
US Hot R&B Singles (Billboard)	1
US Cash Box Top 100	2
Zimbabwe (ZIMA)	3

=== Year-end charts ===
Chart (1991)	Position
Australia (ARIA)	21
Belgium (Ultratop)	36
Brazil (Crowley)	25
Canada Dance/Urban (RPM)	38
Europe (Eurochart Hot 100)	18
Europe (European Hit Radio)	24
France Airplay (SNEP)	20
Germany (Media Control)	23
Netherlands (Dutch Top 40)	18
Netherlands (Single Top 100)	18
New Zealand (RIANZ)	5
Sweden (Topplistan)	29
UK Singles (OCC)	10
UK Club Chart (Record Mirror)	30
US Billboard Hot 100	2
US 12-inch Singles Sales (Billboard)	3
US Hot R&B Singles (Billboard)	35
US Cash Box Top 100	15

== Certifications ==
Region	Certification	Certified units/sales
Australia (ARIA)	Gold	35,000^{^}
New Zealand (RMNZ)	Platinum	30,000^{‡}
United Kingdom (BPI)	Silver	200,000^{^}
United States (RIAA)	2× Platinum	2,000,000^{^}
^{^} Shipments figures based on certification alone.^{‡} Sales+streaming figures based on certification alone.

== Release history ==
Region	Date	Label(s)	Ref.
United States	March 7, 1991	Giant; Reprise	
United Kingdom	May 6, 1991	Giant; Reprise	
Australia	June 24, 1991	Reprise	
Japan	December 21, 1991	Giant; Reprise	

== Covers, remixes and samples ==
A sample of "I Wanna Sex You Up" was used in the Kardinal Beats remix of "Tick Tock" by Lemar.

== See also ==
- R&B number-one hits of 1991 (USA)
- List of number-one singles from the 1990s (UK)
- List of number-one singles in 1991 (NZ)
