= The Isley Brothers discography =

- Studio albums: 33
- Live albums: 4
- Compilation albums: 15
- Singles: 110
- Other albums: 1

This is the discography documenting albums and singles released by American family musical group The Isley Brothers.

Formed initially as a gospel sibling quartet with brothers Kelly, Rudy, Ron and Vernon Isley, the group became a trio after Vernon was tragically killed in 1955 accidentally being hit by a car while riding his bicycle. In 1957, the teenage siblings moved to New York from Ohio to start their career in R&B music. They struggled with initial recordings in the doo-wop subgenre until the release of the gospel-inflected "Shout" in 1959 on RCA Victor Records. The song peaked at number 47 on the Billboard Hot 100, later selling over a million copies. In 1962, they entered the top 20 on the same chart with Bert Berns' "Twist and Shout", followed by their 1966 Motown hit, "This Old Heart of Mine (Is Weak for You)".

After forming their own record label, T-Neck Records, the group wrote and produced their career-defining hit "It's Your Thing" in 1969, which peaked at number two on the Billboard Hot 100 and number one on the Top Selling Soul Singles chart, which won them the Grammy Award for Best R&B Vocal Performance by a Duo or Group. The group eventually became a sextet with younger brothers Ernie and Marvin and brother-in-law Chris Jasper and recorded primarily funk, rock and soul music. Between 1969 and 1981, the group recorded 28 chart singles on the Billboard Hot 100, including nine Top 40 singles and three Top 10 singles including "That Lady" (1973) and "Fight the Power" (1975).

After several group members deflected from the group due to monetary reasons, illness, death and religion, the Isleys - now just a duo of Ron and Ernie - returned to the Billboard Hot 100 in 1996, after a 15-year drought, with three charting singles "Let's Lay Together", "Floatin' On Your Love" and "Tears". In doing so, they surpassed the Spinners as the longest-charting musical act in Hot 100 history, as well as the first act to enter the Hot 100 in five decades. In 2001, the top 20 hit "Contagious" made them the first act to have a chart hit in six.

Their Hot 100 chart span lasted 44 years with 40 total chart entries between 1959 and 2003, with 12 Top 40 singles, 7 Top 20 singles and three Top 10 singles. On the R&B charts, the act recorded 71 total chart entries between 1962 and 2006, with 58 Top 40 singles, 41 Top 20 singles, 27 Top 10 singles and 6 number one singles. In addition, they charted 32 albums on the Billboard 200 between 1962 and 2017, including 16 Top 40 albums, 9 Top 10 Albums and two number one albums while on the R&B albums chart, they charted 38 albums between 1966 and 2007, including 34 Top 40 albums, 26 Top 20 albums, 20 Top 10 albums and 10 number one albums. Of those albums, fifteen of them have been certified gold, platinum and/or multi-platinum in the United States.

== Albums ==
=== Studio albums ===
Year	Title	Peak chart positions						Certifications	Record label
Year	Title	US	US R&B	AUS	CAN	NLD	UK	Certifications	Record label
1959	Shout!	—	—	—	—	—	—		RCA Victor
1962	Twist & Shout	61	—	—	—	—	—		Wand
1963	Twisting and Shouting	—	—	—	—	—	—		United Artists
1966	This Old Heart of Mine	140	15	—	—	—	23		Tamla
1967	Soul on the Rocks	—	—	—	—	—	—		Tamla
1969	It's Our Thing	22	2	—	24	—	—		T-Neck
1969	The Brothers: Isley	180	20	—	—	—	—		T-Neck
1970	Get into Something	—	—	—	—	—	—		T-Neck
1971	Givin' It Back	71	13	—	—	—	—		T-Neck
1972	Brother, Brother, Brother	29	5	—	—	—	—		T-Neck
1973	3 + 3	8	2	—	66	—	—	RIAA: Platinum; BPI: Silver	T-Neck
1974	Live It Up	14	1	—	17	—	—	RIAA: Platinum	T-Neck
1975	The Heat Is On	1	1	99	25	—	—	RIAA: 2× Platinum	T-Neck
1976	Harvest for the World	9	1	—	32	—	50	RIAA: Platinum	T-Neck
1977	Go for Your Guns	6	1	—	39	—	46	RIAA: 2× Platinum	T-Neck
1978	Showdown	4	1	—	68	—	50	RIAA: Platinum	T-Neck
1979	Winner Takes All	14	3	—	—	—	—	RIAA: Gold	T-Neck
1980	Go All the Way	8	1	—	—	—	—	RIAA: Platinum	T-Neck
1981	Grand Slam	28	3	—	—	—	—	RIAA: Gold	T-Neck
1981	Inside You	45	8	—	—	—	—		T-Neck
1982	The Real Deal	87	9	—	—	—	—		T-Neck
1983	Between the Sheets	19	1	—	—	—	—	RIAA: Platinum	T-Neck
1985	Masterpiece	140	19	—	—	—	—		Warner Bros.
1987	Smooth Sailin'	64	5	—	—	—	—		Warner Bros.
1989	Spend the Night	89	4	—	—	—	—		Warner Bros.
1992	Tracks of Life	140	19	—	—	—	—		Warner Bros.
1996	Mission to Please	31	2	—	—	—	—	RIAA: Platinum	Island
2001	Eternal	3	1	—	—	50	—	RIAA: Platinum	DreamWorks
2003	Body Kiss	1	1	—	—	—	—	RIAA: Gold	DreamWorks
2006	Baby Makin' Music	5	1	—	—	—	—		Def Soul
2007	I'll Be Home for Christmas	—	38	—	—	—	—		Def Soul
2017	Power of Peace (with Santana)	64	32	—	—	—	—		Sony Legacy
2022	Make Me Say It Again, Girl	—	—	—	—	—	—		BFD/BSMF
"—" denotes a recording that did not chart or was not released in that territory.

=== Live albums ===
Year	Title	Peak chart positions		Record label
Year	Title	US	US R&B	Record label
1969	Live at Yankee Stadium	169	34	T-Neck
1973	The Isleys Live	139	14	T-Neck
1993	Live!	—	34	Elektra
"—" denotes a releases that did not chart.

=== Compilation albums ===
Year	Title	Peak chart positions			Certifications (sales thresholds)	Record label
Year	Title	US	US R&B	UK	Certifications (sales thresholds)	Record label
1966	Take Some Time Out for the Isley Brothers	—	—	—		Scepter
1969	The Best of the Isley Brothers [819-552]	—	—	—		Scepter
1969	Doin' Their Thing: Best of the Isley Brothers	—	—	—		Tamla
1971	In the Beginning... (with Jimi Hendrix)	—	—	—		T-Neck
1973	Isleys' Greatest Hits	195	24	—		T-Neck
1976	The Best...	—	49	—		Buddah
1977	Forever Gold	58	40	—		T-Neck
1978	Timeless	—	70	—		T-Neck
1984	Greatest Hits, Vol. 1	—	—	41	RIAA: 2× Platinum	T-Neck
1991	The Isley Brothers Story, Vol. 1: Rockin' Soul (1959-68)	—	—	—		Rhino
1991	The Isley Brothers Story, Vol. 2: The T-Neck Years (1969-85)	—	—	—		Rhino
1994	Beautiful Ballads	—	67	—	RIAA: Gold	Legacy
1997	Greatest Hits	—	—	—	BPI: Silver	Epic
1999	It's Your Thing: The Story of the Isley Brothers	—	—	—		Legacy
2000	Ultimate Isley Brothers	—	—	—		Legacy
2001	Love Songs	—	91	—		Legacy
2004	The Essential Isley Brothers	—	—	—		Sony Music
2004	Taken to the Next Phase	135	26	—		Sony Music
2005	Summer Breeze: Greatest Hits	—	—	69		Sony Music
2006	Brotherhood	—	—	—		Starbucks
2006	Beautiful Ballads, Vol. 2	—	—	—		Sony Music
2007	The Definitive Collection	—	29	—		Hip-O
2015	RCA Victor and T-Neck Album Masters (1959-1983) (Note: Released August 21, 2015: 23 disc remastered box set in mini-LP slip cases.)	—	—	—		Legacy
"—" denotes a recording that did not chart or was not released in that territory.

== Singles ==
=== The early years (1957–66) ===
Year	Title (A-side, B-side) Both sides from same album except where indicated	Peak chart positions					Record label	Album
Year	Title (A-side, B-side) Both sides from same album except where indicated	US	US R&B	AUS	CAN	UK	Record label	Album
1957	"The Cow Jumped Over the Moon" b/w "Angels Cried"	—	—	—	—	—	Teenage	Non-album tracks
1957	"Don't Be Jealous" b/w "Rockin' MacDonald"	—	—	—	—	—	Mark X	Non-album tracks
1958	"I Wanna Know" b/w "Everybody's Gonna Rock and Roll"	—	—	—	—	—	Gone	Non-album tracks
1958	"This Is the End" b/w "Don't Be Jealous"	—	—	—	—	—	Cindy	Non-album tracks
1958	"My Love" b/w "The Drag"	—	—	—	—	—	Gone	Non-album tracks
1959	"I'm Gonna Knock on Your Door" b/w "Turn to Me"	—	—	—	—	—	RCA Victor	Non-album tracks
1959	"Shout"—Part 1 b/w Part 2	47	—	2	44	—	RCA Victor	Shout!
1959	"Respectable" b/w "Without a Song"	—	—	—	—	—	RCA Victor	Shout!
1960	"How Deep Is the Ocean" b/w "He's Got the Whole World in His Hands"	—	—	—	—	—	RCA Victor	Shout!
1960	"Gypsy Love Song" b/w "Open Up Your Heart"	—	—	—	—	—	RCA Victor	Non-album tracks
1960	"Say You Love Me Too" b/w "Tell Me Who"	—	—	—	—	—	RCA Victor	Non-album tracks
1961	"Teach Me How to Shimmy" b/w "Jeepers Creepers"	—	—	—	—	—	Atlantic	Non-album tracks
1961	"Standing on the Dance Floor" b/w "Shine on Harvest Moon"	—	—	—	—	—	Atlantic	Non-album tracks
1961	"Your Old Lady" b/w "Write to Me"	—	—	—	—	—	Atlantic	Non-album tracks
1961	"A Fool for You" b/w "Just One More Time"	—	—	—	—	—	Atlantic	Non-album tracks
1962	"Right Now" b/w "The Snake"	—	—	—	—	—	Wand	Twist & Shout
1962	"Shout!"—Part 1 b/w Part 2 Chart re-entry	94	—	—	—	—	RCA Victor	Shout!
1962	"Twist and Shout" b/w "Spanish Twist"	17	2	—	—	42	Wand	Twist & Shout
1962	"Twistin' with Linda" b/w "You Better Come Home" (from Twist & Shout)	54	—	—	—	—	Wand	Non-album tracks
1963	"Nobody but Me" b/w "I'm Laughing to Keep from Crying"	106	—	—	—	—	Wand	Non-album tracks
1963	"I Say Love" b/w "Hold On Baby"	—	—	—	—	—	Wand	Twist & Shout
1963	"Tango" b/w "She's Gone"	—	—	—	—	—	United Artists	Twisting and Shouting
1963	"Surf and Shout" b/w "Whatcha' Gonna Do"	—	—	—	—	—	United Artists	Twisting and Shouting
1964	"You'll Never Leave Him" b/w "Please, Please, Please"	—	—	—	—	—	United Artists	Twisting and Shouting
1964	"Who's That Lady" b/w "My Little Girl"	—	—	—	—	—	United Artists	Non-album tracks
1964	"Testify"—Part 1 b/w Part 2	—	—	—	—	—	T-Neck	In the Beginning
1964	"The Last Girl" b/w "Looking for a Love"	—	—	—	—	—	Atlantic	In the Beginning
1965	"Simon Says" b/w "Wild as a Tiger"	131	—	—	44	—	Atlantic	In the Beginning
1965	"Move Over and Let Me Dance" b/w "Have You Ever Been Disappointed"	—	—	—	—	—	Atlantic	In the Beginning
1966	"Love Is a Wonderful Thing" b/w "Open Up Her Eyes"	110	—	—	—	—	Veep	Non-album tracks
"—" denotes a recording that did not chart or was not released in that territory.

=== The Tamla (Motown) era (1966–69) ===
Year	Titles (A-side, B-side) Both sides from same album except where indicated	Peak chart positions								Certifications	Album
Year	Titles (A-side, B-side) Both sides from same album except where indicated	US	US R&B	AUS	CAN	GER	IRE	NLD	UK	Certifications	Album
1966	"This Old Heart of Mine (Is Weak for You)" b/w "There's No Love Left"	12	6	—	54	—	—	—	3	BPI: Platinum	This Old Heart of Mine
1966	"Take Some Time Out for Love" b/w "Who Could Ever Doubt My Love"	66	—	—	80	—	—	—	—		This Old Heart of Mine
1966	"I Guess I'll Always Love You" b/w "I Hear a Symphony"	61	31	—	74	—	—	—	11		This Old Heart of Mine
1967	"Got to Have You Back" b/w "Just Ain't Enough Love" (from This Old Heart of Mine)	93	47	—	—	—	—	—	—		Soul on the Rocks
1967	"That's the Way Love Is" b/w "One Too Many Heartaches"	—	—	—	—	—	—	—	—		Soul on the Rocks
1968	"Take Me in Your Arms (Rock Me a Little While)" b/w "Why When Love Is Gone" (from Soul on the Rocks)	121	22	—	—	—	—	—	52 (Note: Chart position is from the official UK "Breakers List".)		Doin' Their Thing
1968	"Behind a Painted Smile" b/w "All Because I Love You" (from Isley Brothers)	—	—	89	—	35	17	20	5		Soul on the Rocks
1969	"Put Yourself in My Place" b/w "Little Miss Sweetness" (from Soul on the Rocks)	—	—	—	—	—	—	—	13		This Old Heart of Mine
"—" denotes a recording that did not chart or was not released in that territory.

=== The T-Neck era (1969–84) ===
Year	Titles (A-side, B-side) Both sides from same album except where indicated	Peak chart positions					Certifications	Album
Year	Titles (A-side, B-side) Both sides from same album except where indicated	US	US R&B	CAN	NLD	UK	Certifications	Album
1969	"It's Your Thing" b/w "Don't Give It Away"	2	1	3	—	30	RIAA: Gold	It's Our Thing
1969	"I Turned You On" b/w "I Know Who You Been Socking It To" (from It's Our Thing)	23	6	12	—	—		The Brothers: Isley
1969	"Black Berries"—Part 1 b/w Part 2	79	43	42	—	—		The Brothers: Isley
1969	"Was It Good to You" b/w "I Got to Get Myself Together"	83	33	49	—	—		The Brothers: Isley
1969	"Bless Your Heart" b/w "Give the Women What They Want" (from It's Our Thing)	—	29	—	—	—		Get Into Something
1970	"Keep on Doin'" b/w "Save Me" (from It's Our Thing)	75	17	49	—	—		Get Into Something
1970	"If He Can, You Can" b/w "Holdin' On" (from The Brothers: Isley)	—	21	—	—	—		Get Into Something
1970	"Girls Will Be Girls, Boys Will Be Boys" b/w "Get Down Off the Train" (from The Brothers: Isley)	75	21	—	—	—		Get Into Something
1970	"Get into Something" b/w Part 2	89	25	—	—	—		Get Into Something
1970	"Freedom" b/w "I Need You So"	72	16	—	—	—		Get Into Something
1971	"Warpath" b/w "I Got to Find Me One" (from Get Into Something)	111	17	—	—	—		Non-album track
1971	"Love the One You're With" b/w "He's Got Your Love" (from It's Our Thing)	18	3	41	—	—		Givin' It Back
1971	"Spill the Wine" b/w "Take Inventory" (from Get Into Something)	49	14	—	—	—		Givin' It Back
1971	"Lay Lady Lay" b/w "Vacuum Cleaner" (from The Brothers: Isley)	71	29	—	—	—		Givin' It Back
1972	"Lay-Away" b/w "Feel Like the World" (from It's Our Thing)	54	6	—	—	—		Brother, Brother, Brother
1972	"Pop That Thang" b/w "I Got to Find Me One" (from Get Into Something)	24	3	—	—	—		Brother, Brother, Brother
1972	"Work to Do" b/w "Beautiful" (from Get Into Something)	51	11	74	—	—		Brother, Brother, Brother
1973	"It's Too Late" b/w "Nothing to Do But Today" (from Givin' It Back)	—	39	—	—	—		Brother, Brother, Brother
1973	"That Lady"—Part 1 b/w Part 2	6	2	20	20	14	RIAA: Gold	3 + 3
1973	"What It Comes Down To" /	55	5	—	—	—		3 + 3
1973	"The Highways of My Life"	—	—	—	—	25		3 + 3
1974	"Summer Breeze"—Part 1 b/w Part 2	60	10	84	—	16	BPI: Silver	3 + 3
1974	"Live It Up"—Part 1 b/w Part 2	52	4	65	—	54		Live It Up
1974	"Midnight Sky"—Part 1 b/w Part 2	73	8	72	—	—		Live It Up
1975	"Fight the Power"—Part 1 b/w Part 2	4	1	31	—	—	RIAA: Gold	The Heat Is On
1975	"For the Love of You"—Parts 1 & 2 b/w "You Walk Your Way" (from 3+3)	22	10	35	—	—		The Heat Is On
1976	"Who Loves You Better"—Part 1 b/w Part 2	47	3	—	—	—		Harvest for the World
1976	"Harvest for the World" b/w Instrumental version of A-side	63	9	88	—	10		Harvest for the World
1977	"The Pride"—Part 1 b/w Part 2	63	1	—	—	52		Go for Your Guns
1977	"Livin' in the Life" b/w "Go for Your Guns"	40	4	—	—	—		Go for Your Guns
1977	"Voyage to Atlantis" b/w "So You Wanna Stay Down" (from Harvest for the World)	—	50	—	—	—		Go for Your Guns
1978	"Take Me to the Next Phase"—Part 1 b/w Part 2	—	1	92	—	50		Showdown
1978	"Groove with You" b/w "Footsteps in the Dark"—Parts 1 & 2 (from Go for Your Guns)	—	16	—	—	—		Showdown
1978	"Showdown"—Part 1 b/w Part 2	—	—	—	—	—		Showdown
1979	"I Wanna Be with You"—Part 1 b/w Part 2	—	1	—	—	—		Winner Takes All
1979	"Winner Takes All" b/w "Fun and Games" (from Showdown)	—	38	—	—	—		Winner Takes All
1979	"It's a Disco Night (Rock Don't Stop)" b/w "Ain't Givin' Up No Love" (from Showdown)	90	27	—	—	14		Winner Takes All
1980	"Don't Say Goodnight (It's Time for Love)"—Parts 1 & 2 b/w Instrumental version of A-side	39	1	—	—	—		Go All the Way
1980	"Here We Go Again"—Part 1 b/w Part 2	—	11	—	—	—		Go All the Way
1980	"Say You Will"—Part 1 b/w Part 2	—	—	—	—	—		Go All the Way
1981	"Who Said?" b/w "(Can't You See) What You Do to Me" (from Winner Takes All)	—	20	—	—	—		Grand Slam
1981	"Hurry Up and Wait" b/w Instrumental version of A-side	58	17	—	—	—		Grand Slam
1981	"I Once Had Your Love (And I Can't Let Go)" b/w Instrumental version of A-side	—	57	—	—	—		Grand Slam
1981	"Inside You"—Part 1 b/w Part 2	—	10	—	—	—		Inside You
1982	"Welcome into My Heart" b/w "Party Night" (from Grand Slam)	—	45	—	—	—		Inside You
1982	"The Real Deal" b/w Instrumental version of A-side	—	14	—	—	—		The Real Deal
1982	"It's Alright with Me" b/w Instrumental version of A-side	—	59	—	—	—		The Real Deal
1983	"All in My Lover's Eyes" b/w "I'll Do It All for You"	—	67	—	—	—		The Real Deal
1983	"Between the Sheets" b/w Instrumental version of A-side	101	3	—	—	52	RIAA: Gold	Between the Sheets
1983	"Choosey Lover" b/w Instrumental version of A-side	—	6	—	—	—		Between the Sheets
1984	"Let's Make Love Tonight" b/w Instrumental version of A-side	—	—	—	—	—		Between the Sheets
"—" denotes a recording that did not chart or was not released in that territory.

=== The later years (1985–present) ===
Year	Titles (A-side, B-side)	Peak chart positions					Album
Year	Titles (A-side, B-side)	US	US R&B	NLD	NZ	UK	Album
1985	"Colder Are My Nights" b/w Instrumental version of A-side	—	12	—	—	—	Masterpiece
1986	"May I?" b/w Instrumental version of A-side	—	42	—	—	—	Masterpiece
1987	"Smooth Sailin' Tonight" b/w Instrumental version of A-side	—	3	—	—	—	Smooth Sailin'
1987	"Come My Way" b/w Instrumental version of A-side	—	71	—	—	—	Smooth Sailin'
1987	"I Wish" b/w Instrumental version of A-side	—	74	—	—	—	Smooth Sailin'
1988	"It Takes a Good Woman" b/w Instrumental version of A-side	—	—	—	—	—	Smooth Sailin'
1989	"Spend the Night (Ce Soir)" b/w Instrumental version of A-side	—	3	—	—	—	Spend the Night
1989	"You'll Never Walk Alone" /	—	25	—	—	—	Spend the Night
1990	"One of a Kind"	—	38	—	—	—	Spend the Night
1992	"Sensitive Lover"; CD single with four different mixes	—	24	—	—	—	Tracks of Life
1992	"Whatever Turns You On"; CD single with three different mixes	—	46	—	—	—	Tracks of Life
1994	"I'm So Proud"; Cassette single	—	66	—	—	—	Non-album tracks
1996	"Let's Lay Together" c/w Instrumental version CD single	93	24	—	—	—	Mission to Please
1996	"Floatin' on Your Love" (featuring Angela Winbush); CD single with three different mixes	47	14	—	—	79	Mission to Please
1996	"Tears"; CD single with two different mixes c/w "Make Your Body Sing"	55	12	—	—	—	Mission to Please
1999	"Speechless" single	—	—	—	—	—	Non-album tracks
2001	"Contagious" (featuring R. Kelly & Chanté Moore); CD single with seven different mixes	19	3	2	—	—	Eternal
2001	"Secret Lover"; CD single with three different mixes	—	60	—	—	—	Eternal
2003	"What Would You Do?" (featuring R. Kelly); CD single with three different mixes	49	14	—	—	—	Body Kiss
2003	"Busted" (featuring JS); CD single with four different mixes	—	35	—	—	—	Body Kiss
2003	"Keep It Flowin'" c/w "Prize Possession"; CD single with three different mixes of each track	—	—	—	—	—	Body Kiss
2003	"Prize Possession"; CD single with four different mixes	—	—	—	—	—	Body Kiss
2005	"You Help Me Write This Song"; CD single with three different mixes	—	—	—	—	—	Baby Makin' Music
2006	"Just Came Here to Chill"; CD single with three different mixes	—	25	—	—	—	Baby Makin' Music
2006	"Blast Off" (featuring R. Kelly); CD single with three different mixes	—	—	—	—	—	Baby Makin' Music
2021	"Friends and Family" (featuring Snoop Dogg)	—	45	—	—	—	Make Me Say It Again, Girl
2022	"Make Me Say It Again, Girl" (featuring Beyoncé)	—	9	—	—	—	Make Me Say It Again, Girl
2022	"The Plug"	—	24	—	—	—	Make Me Say It Again, Girl
2022	"Last Time"	—	42	—	—	—	Make Me Say It Again, Girl
"—" denotes a recording that did not chart or was not released in that territory.

== Other appearances ==
Year	Song	Album
1996	"Special Gift"	Special Gift
2011	"That Lady (Part 1)" (live December 14, 1974)	The Best of Soul Train Live
