= The Isleys Live =

1973 album by The Isley Brothers

Live album by The Isley Brothers
- Released: March 24, 1973
- Recorded: 1972 (The Bitter End) Later re-released with 3 additional tracks recorded in 1969 (Yankee Stadium)
- Genre: Funk/soul
- Length: 54:49 (original 2-LP set) 74:29 (CD with bonus tracks)
- Label: T-Neck/Rhino Records
- Producer: The Isley Brothers

The Isley Brothers chronology
Brother, Brother, Brother (1972)	The Isleys Live (1973)	Isleys' Greatest Hits (1973)

Professional ratings
Review scores
Source	Rating
Allmusic	4.5/5 stars
Christgau's Record Guide	B−

The Isleys Live is a live album released by The Isley Brothers on March 24, 1973 on T-Neck Records as a double album with the catalog number TNS 3010-2. Recorded at the Bitter End in New York City, the band are introduced as T-Neck recording artists before they take the stage. Two decades later, Rhino Records re-issued the album including three live dates from the brothers' 1969 show at Yankee Stadium. This album is the only T-Neck recording not reissued by Sony Music Entertainment; instead, it was reissued by Rhino Records.

The album was remastered and expanded for inclusion in the 2015 released CD box set The RCA Victor & T-Neck Album Masters, 1959-1983.

== Track listing ==
All tracks are written by The Isley Brothers except where noted.

Side A
No.	Title	Writer(s)	Length
1.	"Work to Do"		4:18
2.	"It's Too Late"	Carole King, Toni Stern	13:34

Side B
No.	Title	Writer(s)	Length
1.	"It's Your Thing"		3:15
2.	"Pop That Thang"		2:43
3.	"Love the One You're With"	Stephen Stills	6:42

Side C
No.	Title	Writer(s)	Length
1.	"Lay Lady Lay"	Bob Dylan	7:18
2.	"Lay Away"		3:47

Side D
No.	Title	Writer(s)	Length
1.	"Ohio/Machine Gun"	Neil Young/Jimi Hendrix	13:36

Rhino reissue bonus tracks
No.	Title	Length
9.	"I Know Who You Been Socking It To" (Recorded live at Yankee Stadium, 1969)	5:01
10.	"I Turned You On / It's Your Thing" (Recorded live at Yankee Stadium, 1969)	8:24
11.	"Shout" (Recorded live at Yankee Stadium, 1969)	7:39

== Personnel ==
- O'Kelly Isley - backing vocals
- Ronald Isley - lead and backing vocals
- Rudolph Isley - backing vocals
- Ernie Isley - electric guitar
- Marvin Isley - bass
- Chris Jasper - piano
- Neil Bathe - drums
- Karl Potter - congas

Technical

- Michael DeLugg - engineer
