= JS (band) =

American female R&B duo

- Also known as: Johnson Sisters
- Origin: Los Angeles, California, United States
- Genres: R&B; soul
- Years active: 1996–1998; 2001–2004
- Label: DreamWorks
- Members: Kim Johnson; Kandy Johnson
- Past members: Krystal Johnson

JS was an American female R&B duo. The duo consisted of members and sisters Kim Johnson and Kandy Johnson-Isley. After releasing their debut album, Ice Cream, in 2003 to subpar commercial performance, they disbanded a year later.

== History ==
Born in Hollywood, Los Angeles County, California, the Johnson sisters, Kim, Kandy and Krystal co-formed JS as a gospel trio, singing first in church and then with touring gospel artists such as Andrae Crouch and Shirley Caesar. Krystal soon left after engaging in a relationship with Earth, Wind & Fire member Philip Bailey.

Now a duo, the group later appeared on television; Appearances included Ally McBeal and The Oprah Winfrey Show. In 2001, the group signed to DreamWorks Records, a former DreamWorks Pictures division and later a subsidiary of Universal Music Group. They later came under the management of The Isley Brothers lead singer Ronald Isley, having appeared on the band's albums, Eternal (2001) and Body Kiss (2003). Only one-half of JS, Kim, was featured on the Isley Brothers' single "Busted" (US #113) from the latter album. It was nominated for a 2004 Grammy Award for Best R&B Performance by a Duo or Group with Vocals.

On July 29, 2003, they released their debut and only album to date, Ice Cream, which spawned the singles, "Ice Cream" (US #124) and "Love Angel". It debuted at number thirty-three on the Billboard 200. Following the album's imminent performance on Billboard, JS blamed the label, DreamWorks, for its moderate commercial performance, claiming the label failed to properly promote the album and support the group. At the time, DreamWorks Records was at the verge of merging with its Universal Music counterpart, Geffen Records, which the process was completed in December 2003.

After DreamWorks' absorption into Geffen, JS was soon dropped from the label.

Following the 46th Annual Grammy Awards, JS quietly disbanded to focus on personal and solo careers. Kim Johnson performed background vocals for artists like Nelly, Rod Stewart, Jamie Foxx and others. Kandy Johnson later married her mentor, Ronald Isley, in 2005 after supporting him physically throughout their partnership; she performed background vocals on the Isley Brothers' Baby Makin' Music, their only album released on Def Jam Recordings' Def Soul division, and Isley's solo debut, Mr. I, released in late 2010. She was fully supportive of her husband following his conviction of tax evasion charges and three-year prison sentence in 2006. Johnson also gave birth to her and Isley's son, Ronald Isley, Jr., alone due to the situation.

Both sisters reside in Los Angeles, California with Isley and their children. In 2020, the two former JS members, Kim Johnson and Kandy Johnson-Isley, reunited to form their own duo, Kim & Kandy, after being inspired by the success of fellow sibling girl group, duo Chloe x Halle. Later that year, under the Kim & Kandy duo alias, they released a single called "Free" and later, a holiday music extended play, titled Christmas with Kim & Kandy.

== Discography ==
- Ice Cream (2003)
