= Live! (Isley Brothers album) =

Live album by The Isley Brothers
- Released: 1993
- Recorded: 1993
- Genre: Funk, soul
- Length: 1:16.29
- Label: Elektra
- Producer: Ronald Isley, Angela Winbush

The Isley Brothers chronology
Tracks of Life (1992)	Live! (1993)	Mission to Please (1996)

Live! is a 1993 live album by The Isley Brothers on Elektra Records. Their final Warner album, the Isleys sung all of their classic hits including "It's Your Thing", "That Lady", "Between the Sheets", "Voyage to Atlantis", "Shout", "Take Me to the Next Phase", "Fight the Power" and "For the Love of You".

== Critical reception ==
Professional ratings
Review scores
Source	Rating
Allmusic	4/5 stars
USA Today	3/4 stars

== Track listing ==
1. "Here We Go Again"
2. "Between the Sheets"
3. "Smooth Sailin' Tonight"
4. "Voyage to Atlantis"
5. "Take Me to the Next Phase"
6. "Medley - Choosey Lover/Footsteps in the Dark/Groove With You/Hello It's Me/Don't Say Goodnight (It's Time for Love)/Spend the Night (Ce Soir)"
7. "That Lady"
8. "It's Your Thing"
9. "Shout"
10. "For the Love of You"
11. "Fight the Power"
12. "Make Me Say It Again"

== Personnel ==
- Ronald Isley - lead vocals, backing vocals, executive producer
- Ernie Isley - lead guitar
- Tony Maiden - electric guitar
- Marvin Isley, Sekou Bunch - bass guitar
- Rodney Franklin - keyboards
- Roman Johnson - keyboards, synthesizer
- Herman Matthews - drums
- Marina Bambino - percussion
