= Busted (Isley Brothers song) =

Single by The Isley Brothers featuring JS

from the album Body Kiss
- Released: April 24, 2003
- Genre: R&B
- Length: 3:58
- Label: DreamWorks
- Songwriter: R. Kelly
- Producer: R. Kelly

The Isley Brothers singles chronology
"What Would You Do?" (2003)	"Busted" (2003)	"Keep It Flowin'" (2003)

Busted is a song by American duo The Isley Brothers. It was released as a single from their 2003 album Body Kiss. The song was written and produced by R. Kelly. The song, features one member of R&B group JS, Kim Johnson singing background vocals.

In this song played as a mini soap opera, Mr. Biggs (played by Ron Isley), confronts his girlfriend, Asia (played by Kim Johnson) after she gets dropped off by Kellz (played by R.Kelly). Suspecting her of cheating, he demands she leave while Asia desperately pleads to stay while twisting and shifting her story of where she was.

== Music video ==
The music video was directed by Bille Woodruff and was filmed in Beverly Hills, California, USA. The video featured an appearance by half-member of the Isley Brothers Ernie Isley. The video was uploaded on music video site VEVO. The music video follows the storyline of the song's lyrics.

It opens with Asia, played by Kim Johnson, being dropped off on Mr. Biggs's driveway by her alleged boyfriend, played by R Kelly. She then creeps into the house at 2am. Mid-way through the video, Asia and Mr. Biggs (played by Ron Isley) are seen arguing and her making up lies about where she's been all night. Then Mr. Biggs tells Asia to go upstairs and pack her bags and she keeps begging and promising to tell the truth. The video concludes with Mr. Biggs telling his brother to watch surveillance from that night, and they find Asia creeping with R. Kelly in the car. After saying she's "innocent", Asia gets kicked out of the house.

== Charts ==
Chart (2003)	Peak position
US Adult R&B Songs (Billboard)	32
US Bubbling Under R&B/Hip-Hop Songs (Billboard)	3
US Hot R&B Songs (Billboard)	15
US R&B/Hip-Hop Digital Song Sales (Billboard)	9
