= Let's Lay Together =

Single by The Isley Brothers

from the album Don't Be a Menace to South Central While Drinking Your Juice in the Hood: The Soundtrack and Mission to Please
- Released: March 19, 1996
- Recorded: 1995
- Genre: R&B
- Length: 4:42 (Soundtrack Version) 4:32 (Album Version)
- Label: T-Neck Records/Island Records
- Songwriter: R. Kelly
- Producer: R. Kelly

The Isley Brothers singles chronology
"Down Low (Nobody Has to Know)" (1995)	"Let's Lay Together" (1996)	"Floatin' on Your Love" (1996)

"Let's Lay Together" is a single by American soul group The Isley Brothers, released on March 19, 1996 for the soundtrack to the 1996 motion picture Don't Be a Menace to South Central While Drinking Your Juice in the Hood as well as the group's 27th album, Mission to Please. The song was written and produced by R. Kelly (who appeared in his music video for "Down Low (Nobody Has to Know)", with Ron Isley, who also appeared as his alter-ego, Mr. Frank Biggs). "Let's Lay Together" charted at numbers 89 and 93 on the US Cash Box Top 100 and Billboard Hot 100 charts, and number 24 on the Billboard R&B chart.

== Charts ==
=== Weekly charts ===
Chart (1996)	Peak position
US Billboard Hot 100	93
US Hot R&B/Hip-Hop Songs (Billboard)	24
US Cash Box Top 100	89

=== Year-end charts ===
Chart (1996)	Position
US Hot R&B/Hip-Hop Songs (Billboard)	79
