= I Wanna Be with You =

I Wanna Be with You may refer to:

- I Wanna Be with You (album), a 2000 album by Mandy Moore
  - "I Wanna Be with You" (Mandy Moore song), 2000
- "I Wanna Be with You" (Raspberries song), 1972
- "I Wanna Be with You" (Isley Brothers song), 1979
- "I Wanna Be with You" (DJ Khaled song), 2013
- "I Wanna Be with You", a song by Backstreet Boys from their self titled 1996 album
- "I Wanna B with U", a 1995 song by Fun Factory
- "I Wanna Be With You", a song by Bruce Springsteen from Tracks

== See also ==
- "Everywhere" (Fleetwood Mac song), a 1987 song prominently featuring the chorus "I wanna be with you everywhere"
