= Work to Do =

1972 single by the Isley Brothers

- Label of the 1972 US single

Single by The Isley Brothers

from the album Brother, Brother, Brother
- B-side: "Beautiful"
- Released: October 15, 1972
- Genre: Funk; soul
- Length: 3:11
- Label: T-Neck
- Songwriter: The Isley Brothers
- Producer: The Isley Brothers

The Isley Brothers singles chronology
"Pop That Thang" (1972)	"Work to Do" (1972)	"It's Too Late" (1973)

"Work to Do" is a 1972 funk song by the Isley Brothers, released on their T-Neck imprint. The song, written and produced by the group, was issued on their 1972 album, Brother, Brother, Brother, and charted at #51 pop and #11 R&B upon its initial charting.

Lyrically, the song explicates a troubled situation between a man and his girlfriend/wife, concerning the lack of quality time spent with each other. The man pleads that as much as he cannot wait to get home and spend time with her, he has a more pressing obligation/commitment to attend to work.

== Charts ==
=== Weekly charts ===
Chart (1972)	Peak position
US Billboard Hot 100	51
US Hot R&B/Hip-Hop Songs (Billboard)	11

== Credits ==
- Lead vocals – Ronald Isley
- Backing vocals – O'Kelly Isley, Jr., Rudolph Isley
- Percussion, guitars – Ernie Isley
- Bass, percussion – Marvin Isley
- Piano, keyboards – Chris Jasper
- Drums – George Moreland
- Congas – Karl Potter

== Vanessa Williams version ==
"Work to Do"

Single by Vanessa Williams

from the album The Comfort Zone
- Released: July 22, 1992
- Recorded: 1991
- Studio: Blondahl Studios (Copenhagen, Denmark); Creative Source Studios (Studio City, CA); Westlake Audio (Los Angeles, CA)
- Genre: Soul; R&B
- Length: 4:36
- Label: Wing; Mercury
- Songwriters: O'Kelly Isley, Jr.; Ronald Isley; Rudolph Isley; Andres Titus
- Producers: Dr. Jam; Gerry Brown; Phase 5; Vanessa Williams

Vanessa Williams singles chronology
"Just for Tonight" (1992)	"Work to Do" (1992)	"Love Is" (1993)

Music video
- "Vanessa Williams - Work To Do" on YouTube

Vanessa Williams recorded the song for her 1991 album The Comfort Zone. In 1992, her version became a Top 5 US Billboard R&B hit at No. 3 and Top 10 US Billboard Dance hit at No. 8. It was her fifth and final single from the album.

=== Track listings ===
- US CD maxi-single
1. "Work to Do" (Radio Mix w/Rap) – 3:54
2. "Work to Do" (Super Dope Remix w/Rap) – 4:52
3. "Work to Do" (Ken Lou Radio Mix)" – 3:07
4. "Work to Do" (Choice Club) – 6:02
5. "Work to Do" (Choice Dub) – 2:30
6. "Work to Do" (5-Oh Beats w/Rap) – 2:53
- UK CD maxi-single
1. "Work to Do" (7" Mix) – 3:54
2. "Work to Do" (Ken Lou 7" Mix With Rap) – 3:54
3. "Work to Do" (Choice Club)" – 6:02

Remixed by Kenny "Dope" Gonzales and "Little" Louie Vega

=== Charts ===
==== Weekly charts ====
Chart (1992)	Peak position
US Billboard Hot 100	52
US Hot R&B/Hip-Hop Songs (Billboard)	3
US Dance Club Songs (Billboard)	8
US Dance Singles Sales (Billboard)	4
US Rhythmic Airplay (Billboard)	24
US Cash Box Top 100	43

=== Credits ===
- Lead vocals – Vanessa Williams
- Guitar – Ira Siege
- Backing Vocals – Táta Vega
- Rap vocals – Dres
- Piano – Jorgen Kaufma
- Producer – Dr. Jam, Gerry Brown, Phase 5
- Remix producer – Kenny "Dope" Gonzalez, "Little" Louie Vega
