= I'll Be Home for Christmas (Isley Brothers album) =

Studio album by The Isley Brothers
- Released: October 9, 2007
- Length: 40:51
- Labels: Def Soul Classics; Def Jam
- Producer: Jimmy Jam & Terry Lewis

The Isley Brothers chronology
Baby Makin' Music (2006)	I'll Be Home for Christmas (2007)	Power of Peace (2017)

I'll Be Home for Christmas is a studio album and the first christmas album by the American musical group The Isley Brothers. It was released on October 9, 2007, through Def Soul Classics, a division of Island Def Jam Music Group. Their first holiday album, it was produced by Jimmy Jam & Terry Lewis and includes a mix of contemporary Christmas songs and traditional tracks as well as two original songs, "I'm in Love" and "What Can I Buy You," both of which were co-written by Jam and Lewis.

The album earned largely positive reviews from music critics. I'll Be Home for Christmas debuted and peaked at number 38 on the US Top R&B/Hip-Hop Albums chart. Following its release, The Isley Brothers ended up on a temporary hiatus following lead singer Ronald Isley's conviction on tax evasion charges, having served three years in federal prison before being released in 2010 and releasing a solo album.

== Background ==
In May 2006, the Isley Brothers released their thirtieth studio album Baby Makin' Music. It marked their debut release with Def Soul Classics, a division of Island Def Jam Music Group. The album debuted and peaked at number five on the US Billboard 200, while also debuting at number one on the Top R&B/Hip-Hop Albums chart. In September 2007, it was announced that the group would release their first holiday album I'll Be Home for Christmas with the label. Chiefly produced by Jimmy Jam & Terry Lewis, it – along with Patti LaBelle's Miss Patti's Christmas – was one out of the holiday albums that the duo produced for Def Soul Classics that year. Jazz guitarist Doc Powell was consulted to appear on Isley Brothers' rendition of "The Christmas Song (Chestnuts Roasting on an Open Fire)."

== Critical reception ==
Professional ratings
Review scores
Source	Rating
About.com	3.5/5 stars
AllMusic	3/5 stars

AllMusic editor Andy Kellman rated the album three ouf of five stars and wrote: "There's a good balance between secular and spiritual material, so the disc should appeal to just about any Isley Brothers fan who doesn't want to hear the same tired holiday music year in, year out." Ben Ratliff from The New York Times wrote: "Here, on their first Christmas album, it has Ronald on every track; Ernie forsook the traditional Christmas songs ("Winter Wonderland," "I'll Be Home for Christmas") and appears only on the album's one new Isleys-qua-Isleys song, the typically luscious, moody stalemate-of-the-sexes "What Can I Buy You?" ("I’ll buy you anything you want, but you don't care/I never felt this broke being a millionaire.")"

== Commercial performance ==
I'll Be Home for Christmas debuted and peaked at number 38 on the US Billboard Top R&B/Hip-Hop Albums chart. It also reached number 41 on the Top Holiday Albums chart.

== Track listing ==
I'll Be Home for Christmas track listing
No.	Title	Writer(s)	Length
1.	"Winter Wonderland"	Richard Smith; Felix Bernard	4:20
2.	"I'll Be Home for Christmas"	Kim Gannon; Walter Kent	3:04
3.	"I'm in Love"	Bobby Ross Avila; Carla Carter; Issiah J. Avila; James Q. Wright; James Harris III; Terry Lewis	4:10
4.	"Have Yourself a Merry Little Christmas"	Hugh Martin; Ralph Blane	4:17
5.	"Santa Claus Is Coming to Town"	Haven Gillespie; J. Fred Coots	5:01
6.	"Isley Christmas Medley"	Traditional; Isaac Watts; William Chatterton Dix	5:51
7.	"What Can I Buy You"	Wright; Harris; Lewis	4:26
8.	"The Christmas Song"	Mel Tormé; Robert Wells	4:27
9.	"White Christmas"	Irving Berlin	3:33
10.	"Silent Night"	Franz X. Gruber; Josef Mohr	4:12
Total length:			40:51

Notes

- "I'm in Love" co-produced by The Avila Brothers
- "Isley Christmas Medley" consisting of "The First Noel", "What Child Is This?", "Gloria in excelsis Deo" and "Joy to the World"

== Charts ==
Weekly chart performance for I'll Be Home for Christmas
Chart (2007)	Peak position
US Top R&B/Hip-Hop Albums (Billboard)	38
