= This Old Heart of Mine (album) =

Studio album by the Isley Brothers
- Released: May 17, 1966
- Recorded: 1965–1966
- Studio: Studio A, Hitsville U.S.A., Detroit, Michigan
- Genre: R&B; soul
- Length: 33:50
- Label: Motown
- Producer: Brian Holland, Lamont Dozier, William "Mickey" Stevenson, Robert Gordy

The Isley Brothers chronology
Twisting and Shouting (1963)	This Old Heart of Mine (1966)	Soul on the Rocks (1967)

Professional ratings
Review scores
Source	Rating
AllMusic	4/5 stars

This Old Heart of Mine is the fourth studio album released by the Isley Brothers in 1966, on the Motown label. The album, their first with the seminal Detroit-based music label, yielded the Isleys' biggest hit in their early period with the title track, "This Old Heart of Mine (Is Weak for You)". Other charted singles including "Take Some Time Out for Love" and "I Guess I'll Always Love You".

Despite the early success of their Motown debut, the Isley Brothers would be alienated from the label because it treated them as a second-string group. They soon left for Buddah Records and reforming their own T-Neck label in 1969, finding long-lasting success soon afterwards.

The album cover featuring white models was satirized in a scene from the 1991 film The Five Heartbeats, a musical drama chronicling the career of a fictional rhythm and blues vocal group.

== Track listing ==
All tracks are written by Holland-Dozier-Holland, except where noted.

Side one
No.	Title	Writer(s)	Length
1.	"Nowhere to Run"		2:48
2.	"Stop! In the Name of Love"		2:58
3.	"This Old Heart of Mine (Is Weak for You)"	Holland-Dozier-Holland, Sylvia Moy	2:46
4.	"Take Some Time Out for Love"	Thomas Kemp, Robert Gordy	2:26
5.	"I Guess I'll Always Love You"		2:45
6.	"Baby Don't You Do It"		2:32

Side two
No.	Title	Writer(s)	Length
7.	"Who Could Ever Doubt My Love"		2:40
8.	"Put Yourself in My Place"	Holland-Dozier-Holland, John Thornton	2:42
9.	"I Hear a Symphony"		3:13
10.	"Just Ain't Enough Love"		2:15
11.	"There's No Love Left"	Holland-Dozier-Holland, James Dean	2:57
12.	"Seek and You Shall Find"	Ivy Jo Hunter, William "Mickey" Stevenson	3:33

== Personnel ==
The Isley Brothers

- Ronald Isley – lead vocals
- O'Kelly Isley, Jr. and Rudolph Isley – background vocals (except on "I Hear a Symphony")

With

- The Andantes (Jackie Hicks, Marlene Barrow and Louvain Demps) – background vocals on "This Old Heart of Mine (Is Weak for You)" and "There's No Love Left"
- The Funk Brothers – instruments
