= I Wanna Be with You (Isley Brothers song) =

"I Wanna Be with You (Part 1)"

Single by The Isley Brothers

from the album Winner Takes All
- B-side: "I Wanna Be with You (Part 2)"
- Released: 1979
- Genre: R&B, funk
- Length: 6:21 (album version); 4:12 (single version)
- Label: T-Neck; 2279
- Songwriter(s): The Isley Brothers and Chris Jasper
- Producer(s): The Isley Brothers

The Isley Brothers singles chronology
"Groove with You" (1978)	"I Wanna Be with You (Part 1)" (1979)	"It's a Disco Night (Rock Don't Stop)" (1979)

"I Wanna Be with You (Part 1)" is a hit song by R&B/funk group The Isley Brothers. Released from the 1979 double LP, Winner Takes All, it reached number #1 on the U.S. R&B singles chart during the spring of that year. However, the single did not manage to chart on the Billboard Hot 100.
