= Power of Peace =

Studio album by the Isley Brothers and Santana
- Released: July 28, 2017
- Recorded: 2016
- Studios: Audio Mix/The Hideout, Las Vegas, Nevada, United States; Tarpan Studios, Rafael, California, United States
- Length: 66:01
- Language: English
- Label: Legacy Recordings
- Producers: Carlos Santana; Cindy Blackman Santana ("Higher Ground")

The Isley Brothers chronology
I'll Be Home for Christmas (2007)	Power of Peace (2017)	Make Me Say It Again, Girl (2022)

Santana chronology
Berkeley Community Center 1970 Broadcasts (2016)	Power of Peace (2017)	Splendiferous Santana (2021)

The theme is spiritual divine medicine to counter the fever-pitch fear that's permeating this planet right now... Every era has its song ... to help alleviate the condition of brutality and war.

— Carlos Santana on the themes of Power of Peace

Power of Peace is a 2017 studio album made by American rhythm and blues group the Isley Brothers and American Latino rock band Santana.

== Reception ==
Editors at AllMusic rated this album 3 out of 5 stars, with critic Thom Jurek writing that the music is "loose, but everybody brought their chops to the party" and is the sound of great musicians enjoying one another's company. Writing for The Arts Desk, Thomas H. Green gave this album 2 out of 5 stars, writing that there are "passable moments" on the album, but the music "slump[s] into a bland string of slowies". The Independent, Andy Gill rated this album 3 out of 5 stars, calling it "not entirely successful", but noting strong performances on particular tracks. At Louder Sound, Julian Marszalek gave this collaboration 3 out of 5 stars, characterizing it as "not quite a harvest for the world but no spoilt crops either".

Paste's Douge Heselgrave gave this album a 5.8 out of 10, writing "With so much common ground and shared history, having high expectations of such a collaboration is fairly reasonable. And plenty of their fans will probably enjoy Power of Peace quite a lot. It's an impressively produced piece of work. The songs are well-arranged, creatively charted and, for the most part, beautifully performed.", but calling it "a lot less captivating than it should be" and "predictable". Tristan Kneschke of PopMatters scored Power of Peace a 6 out of 10, stating that there are "rough edges" to the music, but that "the album connects us with the expression of love across 20th century songwriting, a sentiment that often seems to have vanished". Daryl Easlea of Record Collector scored this album 4 out of 5 stars, writing that it "is exactly what it is; people old enough to have long packed up this business, getting down to it, having enormous enjoyment doing it". Rolling Stone's Will Hermes rated Power of Peace 3 out of 5 stars, praising Ronald Isley's vocals and Carlos Santana's guitar work. In Spill Magazine, Aaron Badgley gave this work 3.5 out of 5 stars, writing that it is "exactly as you would expect, slickly produced, full of amazing playing and some of the sweetest vocals this side of Heaven".

== Track listing ==
1. "Are You Ready?" (Julian Chambers) – 3:26
2. "Total Destruction to Your Mind" (Jerry Williams Jr.) – 4:23
3. "Higher Ground" (Stevie Wonder) – 5:13
4. "God Bless the Child" (Billie Holiday and Arthur Herzog Jr.) – 7:09
5. "I Remember" (Cindy Blackman Santana) – 5:34
6. "Body Talk" (Kathy Wakefield and Frank Edward Wilson) – 5:22
7. "Gypsy Woman" (Curtis Mayfield) – 7:03
8. "I Just Want to Make Love to You" (Willie Dixon) – 4:04
9. "Love, Peace, Happiness" (George E. Chambers, Joseph Chambers, Lester Chambers, and Willie Chambers) – 3:12
10. "What the World Needs Now Is Love, Sweet Love" (Burt Bacharach and Hal David) – 5:29
11. "Mercy Mercy Me (The Ecology)" (Marvin Gaye) – 4:02
12. "Let the Rain Fall on Me" (Aaron Bell and Houston Person) – 6:27
13. "Let There Be Peace on Earth" (Jill Jackson Miller and Sy Miller) – 4:37

== Personnel ==
The Isley Brothers

- Ernie Isley – rhythm guitar, lead guitar, backing vocals on "God Bless the Child"
- Ronald Isley – lead vocals

Santana

- David K. Mathews – keyboards, Hammond B3 organ
- Karl Perazzo – percussion
- Benny Rietveld – bass guitar
- Carlos Santana – lead guitar, rhythm guitar, guitar, percussion, backing vocals, arrangement, mixing, production, executive production
- Cindy Blackman Santana – drums, lead vocals on "I Remember", backing vocals on "God Bless the Child", arrangement on "Higher Ground", production on "Higher Ground"
- Andy Vargas – rapping on "Higher Ground"

Additional personnel

- Tony Anthony – rhythm guitar
- Maryanne Bilham-Knight – photography
- Charles Boomer – choir vocals
- Jimmy Bruch – photography
- Cornell Carter – choir vocals
- Josh Connolly – engineering, mixing on "I Remember", "Total Destruction to Your Mind", and "Let the Rain Fall On Me"
- Heather Griffin-Vine – artwork, design
- Sandy Griffith – choir vocals
- Kandy Isley – backing vocals
- Tracy Isley – backing vocals, photography
- Kimberly Johnson – backing vocals
- Eddie Levert – backing vocals
- Hal Miller – liner notes
- Greg Phillinganes – keyboards, backing vocals on "Gypsy Woman"
- Maranatha Pryor – choir vocals
- Jim Reitzel – bass guitar, rhythm guitar, keyboards, engineering, mixing, mastering
- Danesha Simon – choir vocals

== Charts ==
Chart performance for Power of Peace
Chart (2017)	Peak position
Austrian Albums (Ö3 Austria)	60
Belgian Albums (Ultratop Flanders)	104
Belgian Albums (Ultratop Wallonia)	108
Dutch Albums (Album Top 100)	128
German Albums (Offizielle Top 100)	28
Scottish Albums (Official Charts)	66
Swiss Albums (Schweizer Hitparade)	60
US Billboard 200	64
US Top R&B/Hip-Hop Albums (Billboard)	32

== See also ==
- 2017 in American music
- List of 2017 albums
