= Behind a Painted Smile =

Single by The Isley Brothers

from the album Soul on the Rocks
- B-side: "One Too Many Heartaches"
- Released: May 1969
- Recorded: 1967
- Genre: Funk, Soul
- Length: 2:45
- Label: Tamla Motown
- Songwriters: Ivy Jo Hunter, Beatrice Verdi
- Producer: Ivy Jo Hunter

The Isley Brothers singles chronology
"Take Me in Your Arms (Rock Me a Little While)" (1968)	"Behind a Painted Smile" (1969)	"Put Yourself in My Place" (1969)

"Behind a Painted Smile" is a song written by Ivy Jo Hunter and Beatrice Verdi. It was recorded in 1967 by The Isley Brothers, appearing on the Soul on the Rocks album, and released as a single that reached number five in the UK charts in May 1969.

== Chart performance ==
Chart (1969)	Peak position
Ireland (IRMA)	17
Netherlands (Dutch Top 40)	26
UK Singles (OCC)	5

== Cover versions ==
- Dutch singer Mathilde Santing released a cover version of the song in 1982.
