= Pop That Thang =

Single by The Isley Brothers

from the album Brother, Brother, Brother
- B-side: "I Got to Find Me One"
- Released: 1972
- Recorded: 1972
- Genre: Funk
- Length: 2:55
- Label: T-Neck
- Songwriters: O'Kelly Isley, Jr.; Rudolph Isley; Ronald Isley; Howard Kelly; Clyde Otis
- Producer: The Isley Brothers

The Isley Brothers singles chronology
"Lay-Away" (1972)	"Pop That Thang" (1972)	"Work to Do" (1972)

"Pop That Thang" is a 1972 funk song released by The Isley Brothers on their T-Neck imprint. Co-written by the three Isley brothers: O'Kelly, Rudolph and Ronald, Howard Kelly and Clive Otis, the song is an uptempo dance number that was featured on the group's 1972 album, Brother, Brother, Brother. A successful record, it reached No.3 on the national R&B charts and No.24 on the pop singles chart. Billboard ranked it as the No. 100 song for 1972.

== Credits ==
- Ronald Isley: lead vocals
- O'Kelly Isley, Jr. and Rudolph Isley: background vocals
- Ernie Isley: guitar, drums
- Marvin Isley: bass
- Chris Jasper: piano, keyboards
- Produced by The Isley Brothers
