= Masterpiece (Isley Brothers album) =

Studio album by The Isley Brothers
- Released: April 29, 1985
- Recorded: 1984−1985
- Venue: Devonshire Sound Studios (North Hollywood, Los Angeles)
- Length: 47:49
- Label: Warner Bros.
- Producer: The Isley Brothers

The Isley Brothers chronology
Greatest Hits, Vol. 1 (1984)	Masterpiece (1985)	Smooth Sailin' (1987)

Professional ratings
Review scores
Source	Rating
AllMusic	4/5 stars

Masterpiece is the 23rd album released by the Isley Brothers on Warner Bros. Records on April 29, 1985. For the first time since 1973, the Isley Brothers were a trio composed of the original members O'Kelly, Rudolph and Ronald Isley. It was the last album with O'Kelly Isley; he died a year after the album's release from a heart attack. The album is dedicated to their late brother Vernon Isley and their parents Sally & O'Kelly Isley Sr. The album liner notes were written by Elaine Isley.

== Track listing ==
Side One
No.	Title	Writer(s)	Length
1.	"May I?"	Ronald Isley, Rudolph Isley, O'Kelly Isley, Elaine Jasper Isley	5:07
2.	"My Best Was Good Enough"	Skip Scarborough	4:20
3.	"If Leaving Me Is Easy"	Phil Collins	6:30
4.	"You Never Know When You're Gonna Fall in Love"	Rex Salas, Monty Seward	4:19
5.	"Stay Gold"	Stevie Wonder, Carmine Coppola	4:11

Side Two
No.	Title	Writer(s)	Length
6.	"Colder Are My Nights"	David Williams, Pat Leonard	6:00
7.	"Come to Me"	Robert Brookins, Tony Haynes	4:53
8.	"Release Your Love"	David Ritz, Kelly McNulty	5:32
9.	"The Most Beautiful Girl"	Billy Sherrill, Rory Bourke, Norris Wilson	6:57

== Personnel ==
The Isley Brothers

- Ronald Isley – lead vocals, backing vocals, rhythm arrangements
- O'Kelly Isley, Jr. – harmony and backing vocals, lead vocals (3), rhythm arrangements
- Rudolph Isley – harmony and backing vocals, rhythm arrangements

Musicians

- Robbie Buchanan – keyboards
- Randy Kerber – acoustic piano
- Dann Huff – guitars
- Paul Jackson Jr. – guitars
- David T. Walker – guitars
- Neil Stubenhaus – bass
- Freddie Washington – bass
- Ed Greene – drums
- John Robinson – drums
- Paulinho da Costa – percussion
- Ernie Watts – saxophone, sax interlude (9)
- Bill Green – horns (saxophones, woodwinds)
- Gary Herbig – horns (saxophones, woodwinds)
- Plas Johnson – horns (saxophones, woodwinds)
- George Bohanon – horns (trombone)
- Dick Hyde – horns (trombone)
- Chuck Findley – horns (trumpet, flugelhorn)
- Gary Grant – horns (trumpet, flugelhorn)
- Jerry Hey – horns (trumpet, flugelhorn), horn arrangements (6)
- Gene Page – arrangements and conductor
- Harry Bluestone – concertmaster

=== Production ===
- The Isley Brothers – executive producers, producers, mixing
- Michael Mancini – engineer
- Russell Schmidt – additional engineer
- Bill Spungin – additional engineer
- Dean Burt – assistant engineer
- Joe Travers – assistant engineer
- Brian Gardner – mastering at Bernie Grundman Mastering (Hollywood, California)
- Elaine Jasper Isley – project coordinator, liner notes
- Jeri McManus – art direction
- Mary Ann Dibs – design
- George Holz – photography

== Chart performance ==
The album charted at #140 in the US Billboard 200 while only charting at #19 on the R&B album chart. "Colder Are My Nights" peaked at #12 on the R&B charts, while "May I?" charted at #42 in 1986.

== Charts ==
=== Weekly charts ===
Chart (1985)	Peak position
US Billboard 200	140
US Top R&B/Hip-Hop Albums (Billboard)	19

=== Year-end charts ===
Chart (1986)	Position
US Top R&B/Hip-Hop Albums (Billboard)	43
