= Brother, Brother, Brother =

Studio album by The Isley Brothers
- Released: May 2, 1972
- Recorded: 1972
- Studio: A&R Studios (New York City)
- Genre: R&B
- Length: 37:42
- Label: T-Neck/Buddah Records
- Producer: The Isley Brothers

The Isley Brothers chronology
Givin' It Back (1971)	Brother, Brother, Brother (1972)	The Isleys Live (1973)

Singles from Brother, Brother, Brother
- 1. "Lay-Away" Released: February 1972; 2. "Pop That Thang" Released: June 1972; 3. "Work to Do" Released: October 1972; 4. "It's Too Late" Released: May 1973

Professional ratings
Review scores
Source	Rating
AllMusic	4/5 stars
Christgau's Record Guide	B
Rolling Stone	favorable
Pitchfork	8.9/10
Uncut	4/5 stars

Brother, Brother, Brother is the tenth album released by American group The Isley Brothers on their T-Neck imprint on May 2, 1972. It was to be the Isleys' last studio record with Buddah Records before moving on to Epic in the middle of 1973.

An R&B album, the album's sound encompasses rock, soul and funk. The album featured the top 40 hit, "Pop That Thang", and subsequent hits "Work to Do", "Lay-Away" and their cover of Carole King's "It's Too Late". The brothers also covered two more King songs including the title track and "Sweet Seasons".

The album was remastered and expanded for inclusion in the 2015 released 23CD box set The RCA Victor & T-Neck Album Masters (1959–1983).

== Track listing ==
Side One
No.	Title	Writer(s)	Length
1.	"Brother, Brother"	Carole King	3:16
2.	"Put a Little Love in Your Heart"	Randy Myers, Jackie DeShannon	3:01
3.	"Sweet Seasons"	Carole King, Toni Stern	2:55
4.	"Keep on Walkin'"	The Isley Brothers	2:15
5.	"Work to Do"	The Isley Brothers	3:11
6.	"Pop That Thang"	Herman Kelly, Clyde Otis, Ronald Isley, O'Kelly Isley, Rudolph Isley	2:53
7.	"Lay Away"	The Isley Brothers	3:08
Total length:			20:39

Side Two
No.	Title	Writer(s)	Length
8.	"It's Too Late"	Carole King, Toni Stern	10:31
9.	"Love Put Me on the Corner"	Chris Jasper	6:32
Total length:			17:03

== Personnel ==
- Ronald Isley – lead and background vocals except 9
- O'Kelly Isley, Jr. – background vocals, lead vocal on 9
- Rudolph Isley – background vocals
- Ernie Isley – guitars
- Marvin Isley – bass
- Chris Jasper – piano, keyboards
- Truman Thomas – organ
- George Moreland – drums, percussion
- Karl Potter – congas

Technical

- Michael Delugg – engineer
