= Body Kiss =

Studio album by the Isley Brothers
- Released: May 6, 2003
- Length: 47:18
- Labels: T-Neck; DreamWorks
- Producers: R. Kelly (also exec.); Tim & Bob

The Isley Brothers chronology
Eternal (2001)	Body Kiss (2003)	Baby Makin' Music (2006)

Body Kiss is a studio album by the Isley Brothers, released on May 6, 2003. It is the final Isley Brothers album to be released under the DreamWorks imprint as the label itself would be absorbed into Geffen Records in October of the same year. Body Kiss was primarily written, arranged, composed and produced by longtime collaborator R. Kelly, with one track produced by Tim & Bob.

The album became the first album since the band's 1975 album, The Heat Is On, to peak at number one on the Billboard 200. It also became the first Isley Brothers album to debut at number one on the chart, also ousting rapper 50 Cent's debut album, Get Rich or Die Tryin' from the top position. It has since been certified gold by the RIAA. Body Kiss yielded the singles "What Would You Do?" and "Busted".

== Critical reception ==
Professional ratings
Review scores
Source	Rating
AllMusic	4/5 stars
New York Post	3/4 stars
Rolling Stone	2/5 stars

AllMusic editor Thom Jurek felt that that Body Kiss was "a better Isleys record than listeners had any right to expect and it is a signature collaboration between the band and R. Kelly; given that this is a first outing for the team, one hopes that the creative field that exists between will be further explored." Billboard found that "Body Kiss, like 2001's Eternal, is another mature, mood-setting affair that relies heavily both on ballads and Ronald Isley's gangster alter-ego, Mr. Biggs. The Isleys again turn to frequent collaborator R. Kelly for its contemporary sounds." Kelefa Sanneh, writing for The New York Times, felt that Body Kiss served as a sequel to R. Kelly's Chocolate Factory. She wrote: "Kelly wrote and produced every song on this disc except one, and he gives Mr. Isley the full R. Kelly treatment: gorgeous vocal lines, sexy-psychotic lyrics, silky hip-hop beats [...] Isley's voice is still in remarkable condition, but what's more impressive is his versatility. While some of his contemporaries grind away on the oldies circuit, he's crooning a duet with Lil' Kim, having more fun than ever."

PopMatters editor Mark Anthony Neal felt that though "there are bright moments [...] unfortunately, too much the production and songwriting on Body Kiss is focused on the drama of Mr. Biggs and rightfully so, since it is the only reason why the 60-plus year-old Ronald Isley has any commercial cachet." Rolling Stone's Jon Caramanica found that it was "not a good thing" that R. Kelly was assigned "with writing and producing all but one song on the Isley Brothers' new Body Kiss [...] giving the Isleys some of his cutting-room-floor material and throwing in some dashes of Curtis Mayfield, Marvin Gaye and, yes, even early Isley Brothers for taste. Kelly's strength, predictably, is in crafting drama [...] The predictable and trite sexual bravado and ostentatiousness that Kelly has made his stock in trade sound absurd coming from a voice as elegant and gifted as Isley's." NPR music critic Jim Fusilli noted that "the album is best when it sticks to seduction and works least when it treats women as pampered objects."

== Commercial performance ==
Body Kiss opened atop the US Billboard 200 and the Top R&B/Hip-Hop Albums chart with first week sales of slightly more than 150,000 copies, becoming the group's first number one album in nearly 30 years. On June 9, 2003, the album was certified Gold by the Recording Industry Association of America (RIAA). By October 2006, Body Kiss had sold 787,000 copies in the United States, according to Nielsen SoundScan.

== Track listing ==
All tracks written and produced by Robert Kelly, except where noted.

Body Kiss track listing
No.	Title	Writer(s)	Producer(s)	Length
1.	"Superstar"			3:54
2.	"Lucky Charm"			4:31
3.	"What Would You Do?" (featuring The Pied Piper)			3:47
4.	"Body Kiss" (featuring Lil' Kim)	Kelly; Kimberly Jones		4:02
5.	"Busted" (featuring JS)			3:58
6.	"Showdown, Vol. 1"			4:59
7.	"Keep It Flowin'"			3:09
8.	"Prize Possession"			3:58
9.	"Take a Ride"			4:15
10.	"I Want That"	Tim Kelley; Bob Robinson	Tim & Bob	4:16
11.	"I Like" (featuring The Pied Piper and Snoop Dogg)	Kelly; Calvin Broadus		3:03
12.	"What Would You Do? Pt. 2" (featuring The Pied Piper)			3:20
Total length:				47:18

== Personnel ==
- Steve Bearsley – Assistant
- Jacquie Carter – A&R
- Rodney East – keyboards
- Tim Kelley – mixing, arranger, producer, keyboards, drum programming
- Bob Robinson – arranger, producer, guitar
- Andy Gallas – engineer
- Abel Garibaldi – programming, engineer, mixing
- Şerban Ghenea – mixing
- Jason Groucott – Assistant
- Andy Heller – assistant engineer
- Ernie Isley – guitar, Soloist
- Ronald Isley – Lead and Background Vocals, Executive Producer
- Bernard Jacobs – stylist
- Kandy Johnson – Background Vocals
- Kim Johnson – Background Vocals
- Jeff Jones – make-up
- R. Kelly – arranger, Background Vocals, Producer, Executive Producer, Mixing, Introduction
- Gregg Landfair – guitar
- Donnie Lyle – bass, guitar
- John McClain – executive producer
- Ian Mereness – programming, engineer, mixing
- Kendall D. Nesbitt – keyboards
- Frances Pennington – creative director
- Mikel Pickett – Assistant
- Herb Powers – Mastering
- Reisig – Photography
- Tim Roberts – Assistant
- Jennifer Scott – A&R

== Charts ==
=== Weekly charts ===
Weekly chart performance for Body Kiss
Chart (2003)	Peak position
US Billboard 200	1
US Top R&B/Hip-Hop Albums (Billboard)	1

=== Year-end charts ===
Year-end chart performance for Body Kiss
Chart (2003)	Position
US Billboard 200	102
US Top R&B/Hip-Hop Albums (Billboard)	23

== Certifications ==
Certifications for Body Kiss
Region	Certification	Certified units/sales
United States (RIAA)	Gold	787,000
