= Smooth Sailin' (Isley Brothers album) =

Studio album by the Isley Brothers
- Released: March 14, 1987
- Recorded: 1986–1987
- Studios: Conway (Hollywood, California); Ocean Way (Los Angeles, California); Westlake (Los Angeles, California)
- Genre: R&B
- Length: 41:23
- Label: Warner Bros.
- Producers: Ronald Isley, Rudolph Isley, Angela Winbush

The Isley Brothers chronology
Masterpiece (1985)	Smooth Sailin' (1987)	Spend the Night (1989)

Smooth Sailin' is an album by the American musical group the Isley Brothers, released in 1987 on Warner Bros. Records. It was the first album that the group released as a duo of Rudolph and Ronald after the untimely death of eldest brother O'Kelly, who died in 1986 due to occlusive coronary artery disease. Hooking up with R&B singer-songwriter Angela Winbush, the Isleys scored with the top 10 R&B title track and "I Wish", also an R&B top 40 hit.

== Critical reception ==
Professional ratings
Review scores
Source	Rating
AllMusic	3/5 stars
The Philadelphia Inquirer	3/4 stars
The Rolling Stone Album Guide	3/5 stars

The Los Angeles Times wrote that the album is close "to the old Isley style-slow, sensuous R&B."

== Track listing ==
Side one
No.	Title	Writer(s)	Length
1.	"Everything Is Alright"	Angela L. Winbush, Ronald Isley, Rudolph Isley	4:57
2.	"Dish It Out"	Angela L. Winbush, Ronald Isley, Rudolph Isley	4:55
3.	"It Takes a Good Woman"	Angela Winbush	5:05
4.	"Send a Message"	Angela L. Winbush	5:33

Side two
No.	Title	Writer(s)	Length
5.	"Smooth Sailin' Tonight"	Angela L. Winbush	4:59
6.	"Somebody I Used to Know"	Ronald Isley, Rudolph Isley, Everett Collins, Angela L. Winbush	4:59
7.	"Come My Way"	Angela L. Winbush, René Moore	5:48
8.	"I Wish"	Raymond Reeder	6:47

== Personnel ==
The Isley Brothers

- Ronald Isley – lead & background vocals
- Rudolph Isley – lead & background vocals

with

- Tony Maiden – guitar (tracks 1–6)
- Angela Winbush – keyboards (tracks 2–8), Moog synthesizer (track 7); bass synthesizer (tracks 1, 2), drum machine (track 5), additional background vocals (tracks 2, 3, 7)
- Jeff Lorber – additional synthesizers (tracks 1, 3–6)
- Raymond Reeder – synthesizer (tracks 7); string line guitar synthesizer & drum machine (track 8)
- Nathan East – bass (tracks 1, 3–6)
- Louis Johnson – bass (track 2)
- Gregory Phillinganes – bass synthesizer (track 2)
- Rayford Griffin – drums (tracks 1, 2, 6)
- Andre Fischer – drums (tracks 4, 7)
- Paulinho da Costa – percussion (tracks 1–3, 5)

Technical personnel & arrangements

- Produced by Ronald Isley, Rudolph Isley & Angela Winbush
- Recorded & mixed by Steve Sykes
- Additional engineer (Conway Studios): Czaba Petocz
- Assistant engineer (Ocean Way Recording): Bob Loftus, Joe Schiff, Mike Ross
- Assistant engineer (Westlake Studios): Debbie Johnson
- Mastered by Brian Gardner
- Art direction & design by Janet Levinson
- Photography by Jeff Katz

== Charts ==
=== Weekly charts ===
Chart (1987)	Peak position
US Billboard 200	64
US Top R&B/Hip-Hop Albums (Billboard)	5

=== Year-end charts ===
Chart (1987)	Position
US Top R&B/Hip-Hop Albums (Billboard)	39
