= I Guess I'll Always Love You =

1966 single by The Isley Brothers

"I Guess I'll Always Love You" is a 1966 single by the Isley Brothers, released on Motown's Tamla label, and is a Holland–Dozier–Holland composition. In the US, the single made both the Hot 100, and R&B singles chart.

The Isleys' version went to number 45 in the United Kingdom, when originally released in September 1966 (TMG 572) and was then reissued again in 1969 (TMG 683) peaking at number 11, a much bigger hit than it ever was in the United States.

== Chart performance ==
Chart (1966)	Peak position
UK Singles (Official Charts Company)	45
US Billboard Hot 100	61
US Billboard Hot Rhythm & Blues Singles	31

Chart (1969)	Peak position
UK Singles (Official Charts Company)	11

== Cover versions ==
- The song was covered by the Supremes for their album titled The Supremes Sing Holland–Dozier–Holland, that was released in 1967 and also featured as the B-side to their single "In and Out of Love" that was released the same year.
