= Tracks of Life =

Studio album by the Isley Brothers
- Released: May 26, 1992
- Recorded: October 1991–February 1992
- Genre: R&B
- Length: 74:20
- Label: Warner Bros.
- Producers: Angela Winbush, Ronald Isley

The Isley Brothers chronology
Spend the Night (1989)	Tracks of Life (1992)	Live! (1993)

Tracks of Life is an album by the American musical group the Isley Brothers, released in 1992. The group was made up of Ernie Isley and Marvin Isley backing up brother Ronald. The album peaked at No. 140 on the Billboard 200 and No. 19 on the Top R&B Albums chart. "Sensitive Lover" was released as a single.

== Production ==
The album was produced by Angela Winbush and Ronald Isley. The pair used synthesizers and keyboard bass on many tracks.

== Critical reception ==
Professional ratings
Review scores
Source	Rating
AllMusic	3/5 stars
Boston Herald	B−
Chicago Tribune	2.5/4 stars
The Indianapolis Star	2.5/4 stars
Orlando Sentinel	4/5 stars
USA Today	3/4 stars

The Indianapolis Star wrote that "the accent is on ballads, with 'Morning Love' and the dreamy 'Sensitive Lover' among the best." USA Today noted that "Ernie's fret work is as sensual as Ronald's purring falsetto." The Chicago Tribune determined that some of the tracks "are as achingly beautiful as anything the band recorded during its heyday in the late '70s." The Boston Herald deemed the album "seldom more than a seductive display of professionalism."

== Track listing ==
All tracks composed by Angela Winbush and Ronald Isley, except where indicated

1. "Get My Licks In" (Angela Winbush, Ernie Isley, Ronald Isley) – 4:17
2. "No Axe to Grind" (Angela Winbush, Ernie Isley, Ronald Isley) – 5:13
3. "Searching for a Miracle" – 4:57
4. "Sensitive Lover" – 6:01
5. "Bedroom Eyes" (Angela Winbush, Leon Ware, Ronald Isley) – 5:36
6. "Lost in Your Love" (Gene McFadden, James McKinney, Ronald Isley) – 6:29
7. "Whatever Turns You On" – 5:14
8. "Morning Love" – 5:26
9. "Dedicate This Song" – 5:26
10. "Red Hot" – 6:24
11. "Koolin' Out" (Roman Johnson, Sekou Bunch) – 4:39
12. "Brazilian Wedding Song (Setembro)" (Angela Winbush, Gilson Peranzzetta, Ivan Lins) – 3:48
13. "I'll Be There 4 U" (Angela Winbush, Ernie Isley, Ronald Isley) – 5:19
14. "Turn on the Demon" (Angela Winbush, Ernie Isley, Ronald Isley) – 5:31

== Personnel ==
- Ronald Isley – lead and background vocals
- Ernie Isley – guitars, drum and synth programming, percussion, background vocals
- Marvin Isley – bass guitars, background vocals
- Angela Winbush – keyboards, synthesizer/synth programming, background vocals
- Eugene Stashuk, Roman Johnson – bass synths
- Sekou Bunch – bass guitar
