= Eternal (Isley Brothers album) =

2001 studio album by the Isley Brothers

Studio album by The Isley Brothers
- Released: August 7, 2001
- Length: 75:37
- Label: DreamWorks
- Producers: Dre & Vidal; Steve Huff; Ronald Isley; Jake and the Phatman; Jimmy Jam & Terry Lewis; R. Kelly; Raphael Saadiq; Angela Winbush

The Isley Brothers chronology
Mission to Please (1996)	Eternal (2001)	Body Kiss (2003)

Singles from Eternal
- 1. "Contagious" Released: July 24, 2001; 2. "Secret Lover" Released: 2002

Eternal is a studio album by American soul group The Isley Brothers. It was released by DreamWorks Records on August 7, 2001 in the United States. Now popular again with audiences, almost single-handledly for Ronald Isley's "Mr. Biggs" persona, Eternal included production from not only R. Kelly who gave the Isleys their biggest hit as leading artists in over two decades with "Contagious" but also from Jimmy Jam & Terry Lewis, Raphael Saadiq and Ronald's wife at the time, Angela Winbush.

Based on the success of lead single "Contagious", Eternal peaked at number 3 on the US Billboard 200 chart, while also topping at number 1 on the Top R&B/Hip-Hop Albums chart, eventually going Platinum. The first album the Isleys released as a duo in over a decade (the first as Ronald and Ernie), Marvin Isley left the group after suffering a bout with diabetes, which later caused both of his legs to be amputated), Ernie Isley also showcase his talents as a guitarist in songs like "Move Your Body" and the aptly titled "Ernie's Jam" while Ronald was still as vocally strong on this album as he had been throughout the Isley Brothers' legendary catalogue.

== Critical reception ==
Professional ratings
Review scores
Source	Rating
AllMusic	3/5 stars
Blender	4/5 stars
New York Post	3/4 stars

Blender critic Dan Epstein wrote: "For this album, the two bring in friends R. Kelly, Angela Winbush, Jill Scott, Lucy Pearl’s Raphael Saadiq, and producers Jimmy Jam and Terry Lewis – with lively results [...] The oldest hit machine in R&B still has it. AllMusic editor Liana Jonas found that while "there is nothing groundbreaking on this recording, the longtime R&B legends prove they're still very much worth their salt and can keep up very well with the Joneses. Indeed, the Isley Brothers are eternal."

Tamara Harris, writing for The Detroit Metro Times, concluded: "A hardworking track record of solid sounds and everything needed to call all fans of rhythmic blues is here; that is why they call this CD Eternal." PopMatters editor Mark Anthony Neal found that it "is understandable that Eternal often lapses into contemporary black pop drivel. Perhaps it is a tribute to Ronald Isley that he can do so when others of his generation have long moved on the senior Circuit. Despite some shortcomings, Eternal is a fitting testament to the longevity of [the] group."

== Commercial performance ==
Eternal debuted and peaked at number 3 on the Billboard 200 chart for the week of August 25, 2001 with first week sales of 225,500 copies, becoming the Isley Brothers' highest-charting project since their 1975 number one album The Heat Is On. It was certified Platinum by the Recording Industry Association of America (RIAA) on September 10, 2001. By May 2003, the album had sold 1.2 million in the US, according to Nielsen SoundScan.

== Track listing ==
Eternal track listing
No.	Title	Writer(s)	Producer(s)	Length
1.	"Move Your Body"	Raphael Saadiq; Robert Ozuna; Glenn Standridge; Angela Winbush; Ronald Isley	Saadiq; Jake and the Phatman^{[A]}	5:15
2.	"Contagious"	Robert Kelly	R. Kelly	5:46
3.	"Warm Summer Night"	Bernard Edwards; Nile Rodgers; R. Isley	Winbush; R. Isley	4:54
4.	"You Deserve Better"	Steve "Stone" Huff	Huff	4:02
5.	"Just Like This"	Huff	Huff	4:18
6.	"Secret Lover"	Huff	Huff	4:23
7.	"You're All I Need"	James Harris III; Terry Lewis; James "Big Jim" Wright; Tony Tolbert	Jimmy Jam & Terry Lewis; Wright^{[A]}	4:49
8.	"Settle Down"	Harris; Lewis; Wright; Tolbert	Jimmy Jam & Terry Lewis; Wright^{[A]}	6:29
9.	"Eternal"	Harris; Lewis; Wright; Tolbert; R. Isley; Ernie Isley	Jimmy Jam & Terry Lewis; Wright^{[A]}	8:30
10.	"If You Leave Me Now"	Peter Cetera	Jimmy Jam & Terry Lewis; Wright^{[A]}	7:02
11.	"Said Enough" (featuring Jill Scott)	Scott; Andre Harris	Dre & Vidal	5:08
12.	"You Didn't See Me"	Saadiq; R. Isley; E. Isley	Saadiq; Jake and the Phatman^{[A]}	4:26
13.	"Ernie's Jam"	Saadiq; R. Isley; E. Isley; Ozuna; Standridge	Saadiq; Jake and the Phatman^{[A]}	4:49
14.	"Think"	Curtis Mayfield; R. Isley	Jimmy Jam & Terry Lewis; Wright^{[A]}	5:00
Total length:				75:37

Notes

- ^{^[A]} denotes co-producer

== Personnel ==
- Ronald Isley – Lead and Background Vocals, Executive Producer
- Ernie Isley – Guitar
- Donnie Lyle – Bass, Guitar
- Peter Mokran – Engineer
- Neil Pogue – Mixing
- Alex Richbourg – Percussion, Drum Programming
- Louil Silas, Jr. – Executive Producer
- Angela Winbush – Keyboards, Producer, Drum Programming, Vocals
- Tony Flores – Assistant Engineer
- Michelle Lynn Forbes – Assistant Engineer
- Raphael Saadiq – Bass, Background Vocals, Producer, Guitar
- Chris Bellman – Mastering
- Bradley Yoast – Assistant Engineer
- Jake and the Phatman – Drum Programming
- Kelvin Wooten – Keyboards
- Andre Harris – Producer
- James "Big Jim" Wright – Keyboards, Background Vocals
- Jeff Vereb – Engineer
- Avant – Background Vocals
- Jill Scott – Background Vocals
- Vidal Davis – Producer, Engineer
- Clint Roth – Engineer
- Andy Gallas – Assistant
- Ian Mereness – Programming, Engineer
- Kevin Guarnieri – Engineer, Digital Editing, Assistant Engineer
- Nick Monson – Assistant Engineer
- Gary Brown – Engineer
- The Johnson Sisters – Background Vocals
- R. Kelly – Arranger, Producer
- Paulinho Da Costa – Percussion
- Steve Hodge – Engineer, Mixing
- Steve Huff – Producer, Instrumentation
- Jimmy Jam – Arranger, Producer, Keyboards
- Terry Lewis – Arranger, Producer, Instrumentation

== Charts ==
=== Weekly charts ===
Weekly chart performance for Eternal
Chart (2001)	Peak position
US Billboard 200	3
US Top R&B/Hip-Hop Albums (Billboard)	1

=== Year-end charts ===
Year-end chart performance for Eternal
Chart (2002)	Position
US Top R&B/Hip-Hop Albums (Billboard)	87

== Certifications ==
Certifications for Eternal
Region	Certification	Certified units/sales
United States (RIAA)	Platinum	1,200,000
