= Soul on the Rocks =

Studio album by the Isley Brothers
- Released: August 29, 1967
- Recorded: 1966–1967
- Studio: Studio A, Hitsville U.S.A. (Detroit, Michigan)
- Genre: Soul
- Length: 30:55
- Label: Motown; T275
- Producer: Norman Whitfield, Ivy Jo Hunter, Smokey Robinson

The Isley Brothers chronology
This Old Heart of Mine (1966)	Soul on the Rocks (1967)	Doin' Their Thing: Best of the Isley Brothers (1969)

Professional ratings
Review scores
Source	Rating
AllMusic	3/5 stars

Soul on the Rocks is the fifth studio album by the Isley Brothers. It was released on the Tamla (Motown) label on August 29, 1967. Their second and final album with the Detroit label, the brothers soon felt disenchanted with their stay at Motown while established groups like the Temptations and the Four Tops, whose styles were more polished than the Isleys, got more promotion. One of the album's tracks, "Behind a Painted Smile" found chart success and made them popular in the United Kingdom, as the Isleys found out on a tour of the country during this period. Motivated, they eventually left Motown and re-formed their T-Neck record label.

== Track listing ==
Side one
No.	Title	Writer(s)	Length
1.	"Got to Have You Back"	Ivy Jo Hunter, Leon Ware, Stephen Bowden	2:45
2.	"That's the Way Love Is"	Norman Whitfield, Barrett Strong	2:17
3.	"Whispers (Gettin' Louder)"	David Scott, Barbara Acklin	2:09
4.	"Tell Me It's Just a Rumor Baby"	Harvey Fuqua, Johnny Bristol, Vernon Bullock	2:56
5.	"One Too Many Heartaches"	Ivy Jo Hunter	2:14
6.	"It's Out of the Question"	William "Smokey" Robinson, Berry Gordy	2:44

Side two
No.	Title	Writer(s)	Length
7.	"Why When Love Is Gone"	Ivy Jo Hunter	2:33
8.	"Save Me from This Misery"	Norman Whitfield, Roger Penzabene, Stephen Bowden	2:26
9.	"Little Miss Sweetness"	William "Smokey" Robinson	2:55
10.	"Good Things"	Robert Bruce, Leroy Kirkland	2:41
11.	"Catching Up on Time"	Clarence Paul, Leon Ware, Morris Broadnax	2:30
12.	"Behind a Painted Smile"	Ivy Jo Hunter, Beatrice Verdi	2:45
