= It's a Disco Night (Rock Don't Stop) =

Single by The Isley Brothers

from the album Winner Takes All
- B-side: "Ain't Givin' Up No Love"
- Released: 1979
- Recorded: 1979
- Genre: Disco
- Length: 8:54 (12-inch version); 4:10 (7-inch version)
- Label: T-Neck
- Songwriter(s): Ernie Isley, Marvin Isley, Chris Jasper, Rudolph Isley, O'Kelly Isley and Ronald Isley.
- Producer(s): Ronald Isley, Rudolph Isley

The Isley Brothers singles chronology
"Life In The City" (1979)	"It's a Disco Night (Rock Don't Stop)" (1979)	"Winner Takes All" (1979)

"It's a Disco Night (Rock Don't Stop)" is a 1979 club hit for The Isley Brothers, released on their T-Neck label as the second single from their gold-certified album Winner Takes All. The song is notable for being one of the few disco-based songs the Isley Brothers released. Beforehand, the group were known for their mixture of funk, rhythm and blues and rock. The song was led by brother Ronald Isley while his brothers Kelly and Rudolph Isley chanted "rock don't stop" in the background. The song briefly charted on the Billboard Hot 100 peaking at number 90, hitting number 27 on the R&B chart. Outside the US, "It's a Disco Night" reached number 14 on the UK Singles chart.

== Chart positions ==
Chart (1979)	Peak position
U.S. Billboard Hot 100	90
U.S. Billboard Disco Top 100	44
U.S. Billboard Hot Soul Singles	27
UK Singles Chart	14

== Credits ==
Unless otherwise noted, information is based on Liner notes.

Performance

- Lead vocals by Rudolph Isley and Ronald Isley
- Background vocals by O'Kelly Isley Jr., Ronald Isley and Rudolph Isley
- Guitar, drums, congas and percussion by Ernie Isley
- Bass, percussion and background vocals by Marvin Isley
- Keyboards, congas and percussion by Chris Jasper

Technical

- George Carnell - Assistant engineer
- John Holbrook - Recording engineer, synthesizer programming
