= Twist & Shout (album) =

Album by the Isley Brothers

Studio album by the Isley Brothers
- Released: April 15, 1962
- Recorded: 1962
- Studio: Bell Sound (New York City)
- Genre: Rock and roll; R&B; soul
- Length: 29:38
- Label: Wand
- Producer: Bert Berns

The Isley Brothers chronology
Shout! (1959)	Twist & Shout (1962)	Twisting and Shouting (1963)

Singles from Twist & Shout
- 1. "Twist & Shout" Released: May 1962

Professional ratings
Review scores
Source	Rating
AllMusic	3/5 stars
The Encyclopedia of Popular Music	4/5 stars

Twist & Shout is the second studio album by the Isley Brothers, released on Wand Records in 1962. The album was released on the success of the title track, which would later become a hit for the Beatles. Other songs on the album include Isley-penned tracks such as "Right Now", "Nobody but Me". Three songs were written by Elaine Jasper, wife of Rudolph Isley and sister of later Isley Brothers member Chris Jasper. Charter "Twistin' with Linda" is included as a bonus track on the 1993 CD reissue.

In 1964, the record label rereleased and renamed Twist & Shout as Take Some Time Out for The Famous Isley Brothers, due to the popularity of the Beatles' rendition of "Twist & Shout". The album cover of Take Some Time Out for The Famous Isley Brothers is a picture of the trio performing in a night club.

The album peaked at No. 61 on the Billboard Top Pop Albums chart.

== Track listing ==
Side one
No.	Title	Writer(s)	Length
1.	"Twist and Shout"	Phil Medley, Bert Russell	2:30
2.	"I Say Love"	Phil Medley, Bert Russell	2:07
3.	"Right Now"	Elaine Jasper	3:20
4.	"Hold On Baby"	Phil Medley, Bert Russell	2:28
5.	"Rubber Leg Twist"	Nate Nelson, Elaine Jasper	2:02
6.	"The Snake"	Elaine Jasper	2:10

Side two
No.	Title	Writer(s)	Length
7.	"You Better Come Home"	Bert Russell	2:17
8.	"Never Leave Me Baby"	Bert Russell, Phil Medley	2:23
9.	"Spanish Twist"	Bert Russell	2:30
10.	"Time After Time"	Jule Styne, Sammy Cahn	2:31
11.	"Let's Twist Again"	Kal Mann, Dave Appell	2:09
12.	"Don't You Feel"	Bert Russell, Donald Drowty	3:11

1993 reissue bonus tracks
No.	Title	Writer(s)	Length
13.	"Crazy Love" (Previously Unreleased)	Bert Russell	2:37
14.	"Twistin' with Linda"	Rudolph Isley, Ronald Isley, O'Kelly Isley	2:38
15.	"Nobody but Me"	Rudolph Isley, Ronald Isley, O'Kelly Isley	2:03

== Personnel ==
The Isley Brothers

- Ronald Isley – lead vocals
- O'Kelly Isley, Jr. and Rudolph Isley – background vocals
- The Wrecking Crew – instrumentation

Technical

- Tom Owen – engineer
