= Shout! (Isley Brothers album) =

Studio album by the Isley Brothers
- Released: November 1, 1959
- Recorded: 1959
- Studio: RCA Victor in New York City
- Genre: Rock and roll; R&B; soul
- Length: 30:37
- Label: RCA Victor
- Producer: Hugo Peretti; Luigi Creatore

The Isley Brothers chronology
Shout! (1959)	Twist & Shout (1962)

Singles from Shout!
- 1. "Shout!" Released: August 1959; 2. "Respectable" Released: 1960

Professional ratings
Review scores
Source	Rating
AllMusic	3/5 stars
The Encyclopedia of Popular Music	3/5 stars

Shout! is the debut studio album by the Isley Brothers, released on RCA Victor in 1959. It was produced by Hugo Peretti and Luigi Creatore.

== History ==
After the success of the title track, the group were rushed into a recording studio to record much of the album, which included another Isley standard, the uncharted "Respectable", which, like "Shout", was also covered by rock acts. The album was re-released in 1990 on the Collectables label after the album went out of print in the years since its release. The album was remastered and expanded for inclusion in the 2015 CD box set The RCA Victor & T-Neck Album Masters, 1959-1983.

== Track listing ==
Side one
No.	Title	Writer(s)	Length
1.	"When the Saints Go Marching In"	Traditional	2:29
2.	"St. Louis Blues"	W. C. Handy	2:55
3.	"Yes, Indeed!"	Sy Oliver	2:02
4.	"How Deep Is the Ocean"	Irving Berlin	1:50
5.	"Ring-A-Ling-A-Ling (Let the Wedding Bells Ring)"	Richard Ellis Jackson	2:55
6.	"Rock Around the Clock"	Max Freedman, Jimmy DeKnight	2:10

Side two
No.	Title	Writer(s)	Length
7.	"He's Got the Whole World in His Hands"	Geoff Love	2:02
8.	"That Lucky Old Sun"	Haven Gillespie, Beasley Smith	2:30
9.	"Respectable"	O'Kelly Isley, Rudolph Isley, Ronald Isley	2:10
10.	"Without a Song"	Vincent Youmans, Billy Rose, Edward Eliscu	2:00
11.	"Shout (Part I)"	O'Kelly Isley, Rudolph Isley, Ronald Isley	2:15
12.	"Shout (Part II)"	O'Kelly Isley, Rudolph Isley, Ronald Isley	2:10

== Personnel ==
The Isley Brothers

- Ronald Isley – lead vocals
- O'Kelly Isley, Jr. and Rudolph Isley – background vocals

Technical

- Ray Hall – recording engineer
