= Spend the Night (Isley Brothers album) =

Studio album by The Isley Brothers
- Released: October 5, 1989
- Recorded: 1989
- Studio: Soundcastle (Hollywood); Larrabee (Hollywood); Devonshire (Los Angeles); Golden Lady (New York City); Skip Saylor (Hollywood)
- Length: 42:13
- Label: Warner Bros.
- Producer: Ronald Isley, Rudolph Isley, Angela Winbush

The Isley Brothers chronology
Smooth Sailin' (1987)	Spend the Night (1989)	Tracks of Life (1992)

Spend the Night is the 25th studio album released by The Isley Brothers on Warner Bros. Records on October 5, 1989. The last official record featuring original members Rudolph and Ronald recording together, Rudolph officially left the group after recording this album which explains why Ronald is the only Isley Brothers member on the cover.

== Reception ==
Professional ratings
Review scores
Source	Rating
AllMusic	3/5 stars

Essentially considered a Ronald Isley solo album and co-conceived by his manager and then-girlfriend Angela Winbush, the album also included a guest rap by Kool Moe Dee on the song "Come Together" and spawned three top 30 R&B chart hits.

== Track listing ==
All tracks are written by Angela Winbush.

Side One
No.	Title	Length
1.	"Spend the Night (Ce Soir)"	6:07
2.	"You'll Never Walk Alone"	6:11
3.	"One of a Kind"	5:10
4.	"Real Woman"	4:37

Side Two
No.	Title	Length
5.	"Come Together"	6:44
6.	"If You Ever Need Somebody"	5:20
7.	"Baby Come Back Home"	6:55
8.	"One of a Kind (Reprise)"	1:16

== Personnel ==
The Isley Brothers

- Ronald Isley – lead & background vocals
- Rudolph Isley – lead & background vocals

with

- Tony Maiden – lead guitar (tracks 2, 3, 5–7)
- Angela Winbush – synthesizer (tracks 2, 3, 7), keyboards (tracks 1–5, 7), bass synthesizer (tracks 1, 7), drum machine programming (tracks 1–7), flute solo (track 1), additional background vocals (tracks 1, 3, 5–7)
- Jeff Lorber – additional synthesizers (tracks 2, 3, 7)
- Nathan East – bass (tracks 1–5, 7)
- Rayford Griffin – synth drums & toms (track 5)
- John Robinson – drums (tracks 2, 7)
- Kool Moe Dee – rap guest on "Come Together"

Technical personnel & arrangements

- Produced by Ronald Isley, Rudolph Isley & Angela Winbush
- Arranged by Angela Winbush
- String arrangements by Gene Page
- Recorded & mixed by Jeff Lorenzen
- Strings recorded by Mike Mancini
- Additional engineer: Mitch Gibson
- Assistant engineers: Darren Prindle, Dennis Stefani, Jim Champagne, Mark Hagen
- Mastered by Brian Gardner
- Art direction by Janet Levinson
- Design by Johnny Lee
- Photography by Jeff Katz
