= Winner Takes All (album) =

Studio album by the Isley Brothers
- Released: August 21, 1979
- Recorded: 1978–1979
- Studio: Bearsville (Woodstock, New York)
- Genres: Funk; soul; rock; disco; pop
- Length: 72:28
- Label: T-Neck Records
- Producer: The Isley Brothers

The Isley Brothers chronology
Timeless (1978)	Winner Takes All (1979)	Go All the Way (1980)

Singles from Winner Takes It All
- 1. "I Wanna Be with You" Released: April 1979; 2. "Winner Takes All" Released: July 1979; 3. "It's a Disco Night (Rock Don't Stop)" Released: August 1979

Winner Takes All is the seventeenth studio album by the Isley Brothers, released on T-Neck Records on August 21, 1979. It was their first and only double album. The album included the number-one R&B hit, "I Wanna Be With You" and the top 20 UK disco hit, "It's a Disco Night (Rock Don't Stop)".

The album was remastered and expanded for inclusion in the 2015 released CD box set The RCA Victor & T-Neck Album Masters, 1959–1983.

The album continued the brothers' trademark of mixing uptempo funk numbers with softer soul balladry. However, their sound now included elements of disco. While some of their music had pioneered the genre, Winner Takes All was the first album to embrace disco rhythms.

The disco element helped songs such as "I Wanna Be With You" and "It's a Disco Night (Rock Don't Stop)" become hits. However, the band did not release any ballads from the album, making it one of the few times since 1973 that they not release a ballad as a single. However, ballads like "You're Beside Me" and "How Lucky I Am" still received airplay on quiet storm radio formats.

The album was successful enough on both the pop and R&B album charts where it reached #14 and #3 respectively and eventually went gold after selling past 500,000 copies.

== Critical reception ==
Professional ratings
Review scores
Source	Rating
AllMusic	3/5 stars
Christgau's Record Guide	C+
Smash Hits	mixed

The Bay State Banner wrote that "every song is done in the characteristic two-part formula, with high energy levels and the familiar funk-rock synthesis."

== Track listing ==
Unless otherwise noted, Information is based on Liner notes

All tracks are written by Ernie Isley, Marvin Isley, Chris Jasper, Rudolph Isley, O'Kelly Isley and Ronald Isley.

Side one
No.	Title	Length
1.	"I Wanna Be with You (Parts 1 & 2)"	6:20
2.	"Liquid Love (Parts 1 & 2)"	5:17
3.	"Winner Takes All"	4:18

Side two
No.	Title	Length
4.	"Life in the City (Parts 1 & 2)"	7:55
5.	"It's a Disco Night (Rock Don't Stop) (Parts 1 & 2)"	5:13
6.	"(Can't You See) What You Do to Me?"	4:09

Side three
No.	Title	Length
1.	"Let's Fall in Love (Parts 1 & 2)"	4:39
2.	"How Lucky I Am (Parts 1 & 2)"	5:38
3.	"You're the Key to My Heart"	3:26
4.	"You're Beside Me (Parts 1 & 2)"	5:32

Side four
No.	Title	Length
5.	"Let Me into Your Life (Parts 1 & 2)"	5:10
6.	"Love Comes and Goes (Parts 1 & 2)"	5:07
7.	"Go for What You Know"	3:24
8.	"Mind Over Matter (Parts 1 & 2)"	6:00

2013 reissue bonus track
No.	Title	Length
1.	"It's a Disco Night (Rock Don't Stop)" (12" Disco Version)	8:44

2015 reissue bonus tracks as part of "The RCA Victor & T-Neck Album Masters (1959-1983)"
No.	Title	Length
1.	"I Wanna Be With You (Parts 1 & 2)" (12" Extended Version)	7:27
2.	"It's a Disco Night (Rock Don't Stop)" (12" Disco Version)	8:44
3.	"Rudy's Tune (How Lucky I Am)" (Bonus Track)	5:45

== Personnel ==
Performance

- Ronald Isley - lead vocals, background vocals
- O'Kelly Isley, Jr. - background vocals
- Rudolph Isley - background vocals
- Ernie Isley - maracas, drums, congas, timbales, percussion, guitar, background vocals
- Marvin Isley - background vocals, bass, percussion
- Chris Jasper - piano, clavinet, ARP synthesizer, keyboards, congas, percussion, background vocals

Technical

- George Carnell - assistant engineer
- John Holbrook - recording engineer, synthesizer programming

== Charts ==
Chart (1979)	Peak position
Billboard Pop Albums	14
Billboard Top Soul Albums	3

== Certifications ==
Region	Certification	Certified units/sales
United States (RIAA)	Gold	500,000^{^}
^{^} Shipments figures based on certification alone.
