= Mission to Please =

Studio album by The Isley Brothers
- Released: May 14, 1996
- Length: 45:57
- Label: T-Neck; Island
- Producer: Ronald Isley; R. Kelly; Keith Sweat; Angela Winbush

The Isley Brothers chronology
Live! (1993)	Mission to Please (1996)	Eternal (2001)

Mission to Please is a studio album by the Isley Brothers. It was released on May 14, 1996, on Island Records and group's own label, T-Neck Records. The last Isley Brothers album to feature youngest brother Marvin Isley, who left the group in 1997 because of complications from diabetes and died in June 2010, it was a return to commercial glory for the group in the years following their platinum-certified album Between the Sheets (1983).

The album went platinum based on the strength of the charted singles "Let's Lay Together," a new duet with R. Kelly after the success of "Down Low (Nobody Has to Know)" (1995); the Babyface-composed ballad "Tears"; "Floatin' on Your Love," with Angela Winbush (Ronald Isley and she were married from 1993 to 2002); and the mid-'90s quiet-storm radio staple "Mission to Please You."

== Critical reception ==
Professional ratings
Review scores
Source	Rating
AllMusic	4/5 stars
Muzik	3/5 stars

AllMusic editor Stephen Thomas Erlewine called the album "their strongest efforts of the latter part of their career" and found that Mission to Please had the Isley Brothers "capitalize on the smooth love ballads epitomized by crooners like Babyface, Keith Sweat, and R. Kelly [...] The majority of the songs on the album are first-rate '90s contemporary R&B, and those that aren't quite as strong make for pleasing filler. As a result, Mission to Please is a testament to the talents of not only the Isley Brothers, but also their far-reaching influence."

== Commercial performance ==
Mission to Please debuted and peaked at number 31 US Billboard 200 in the week of June 1, 1996. It marked the Isley Brothers' highest-charting project since their 1983 album Between the Sheets. The album was certified Gold by the Recording Industry Association of America (RIAA) on July 16, 1996, and reached Platinum status on January 23, 1997. Billboard ranked Mission to Please 13th on its 1996 Top R&B/Hip-Hop Albums year-end chart.

== Track listing ==
Mission to Please track listing
No.	Title	Writer(s)	Producer(s)	Length
1.	"Floatin' On Your Love" (with Angela Winbush)	Reggie Griffin; Ronald Isley; Winbush	R. Isley; Winbush; Griffin^{[a]}	4:09
2.	"Whenever You're Ready"	Griffin; R. Isley; Winbush	R. Isley; Winbush; Griffin^{[a]}	4:50
3.	"Let's Lay Together"	R. Kelly	Kelly	4:32
4.	"Tears"	Babyface	R. Isley; Winbush	4:45
5.	"Can I Have a Kiss (For Old Time's Sake)?"	Kelly; Winbush	Kelly	4:46
6.	"Mission to Please You"	Kelly; R. Isley; Winbush	Kelly; R. Isley; Winbush	4:27
7.	"Holding Back the Years"	Mick Hucknall; Neil Moss	R. Isley; Winbush	5:30
8.	"Make Your Body Sing"	Griffin; R. Isley; Winbush	R. Isley; Winbush; Griffin^{[a]}	4:06
9.	"Let's Get Intimate"	Ernie Isley; R. Isley; Winbush	R. Isley; Winbush	5:57
10.	"Slow Is the Way"	Emanuel Officer; Keith Sweat	Sweat	4:55
Total length:				45:57

Notes

- ^{^[a]} denotes co-producer

== Charts ==
=== Weekly charts ===
Weekly chart performance for Mission to Please
Chart (1996)	Peak position
US Billboard 200	31
US Top R&B/Hip-Hop Albums (Billboard)	2

=== Year-end charts ===
1996 year-end chart performance for Mission to Please
Chart (1996)	Position
US Billboard 200	112
US Top R&B/Hip-Hop Albums (Billboard)	13

1997 year-end chart performance for Mission to Please
Chart (1997)	Position
US Top R&B/Hip-Hop Albums (Billboard)	60

== Certifications ==
Certifications for Mission to Please
Region	Certification	Certified units/sales
United States (RIAA)	Platinum	1,000,000^{^}
^{^} Shipments figures based on certification alone.
