= Twisting and Shouting =

Studio album by the Isley Brothers
- Released: 1963
- Recorded: 1963
- Studio: Bell Sound (New York City)
- Genre: Rock and roll; R&B; soul
- Length: 30:10
- Label: United Artists
- Producer: Bert Berns

The Isley Brothers chronology
Twist & Shout (1962)	Twisting and Shouting (1963)	This Old Heart of Mine (1966)

Professional ratings
Review scores
Source	Rating
AllMusic	3/5 stars

Twisting and Shouting is the third album released by the Isley Brothers in 1963, credited as the Famous Isley Brothers, on the United Artists label. Their third album after Twist & Shout one year prior, the album was released with none of the songs making the singles chart, and preceded a three-year gap before the brothers' next album, This Old Heart of Mine (1966), which would see them move to Berry Gordy's Motown label. In 1991, the album was reissued on CD with extra tracks and retitled The Complete United Artists Sessions.

== Track listing ==
Side one
No.	Title	Writer(s)	Length
1.	"Surf and Shout"	Phil Medley, Ruth Batchelor	2:29
2.	"Please, Please, Please"	James Brown, Johnny Terry	2:50
3.	"She's the One"	Rudolph Isley, O'Kelly Isley, Ronald Isley	2:39
4.	"Tango"	Rudolph Isley, O'Kelly Isley, Ronald Isley	2:07
5.	"What'cha Gonna Do"	Rudolph Isley, O'Kelly Isley, Ronald Isley	2:18
6.	"Stagger Lee"	Lloyd Price, Harold Logan	2:40

Side two
No.	Title	Writer(s)	Length
7.	"You'll Never Leave Him"	Bert Russell	2:40
8.	"Let's Go, Let's Go, Let's Go"	Hank Ballard	2:30
9.	"She's Gone"	Rudolph Isley, O'Kelly Isley, Ronald Isley	2:50
10.	"Shake It with Me Baby"	Rudolph Isley, O'Kelly Isley, Ronald Isley	2:30
11.	"Long Tall Sally"	Enotris Johnson	2:33
12.	"Do the Twist"	Dale Hawkins	2:04

== Personnel ==
The Isley Brothers

- Ronald Isley – lead vocals
- O'Kelly Isley, Jr. and Rudolph Isley – background vocals

Technical

- Alan Lorber, Garry Sherman – conductor
