= This Old Heart of Mine (Is Weak for You) =

1966 single by the Isley Brothers

Single by the Isley Brothers

from the album This Old Heart of Mine
- B-side: "There's No Love Left"
- Released: January 12, 1966
- Recorded: Hitsville U.S.A. (Studio A)
- Genre: Soul
- Length: 2:46
- Label: Tamla
- Songwriters: Holland–Dozier–Holland, Sylvia Moy
- Producers: Brian Holland, Lamont Dozier

The Isley Brothers singles chronology
"Love Is a Wonderful Thing" (1966)	"This Old Heart of Mine (Is Weak for You)" (1966)	"Take Some Time Out for Love" (1966)

"This Old Heart of Mine (Is Weak for You)" is a Holland–Dozier–Holland song that was a hit for American musical group the Isley Brothers in January 1966 during their brief tenure on Motown's Tamla label. Featuring Ronald Isley on lead vocal, "This Old Heart of Mine" peaked at number twelve on the Billboard Hot 100, and at number six on the Billboard R&B Singles chart.

In the UK, the song originally reached number 47 in April 1966, but it re-charted in late 1968 and reached number three for two weeks in November, making it the group's highest charting UK single.

Written by Motown's main songwriting team Holland–Dozier–Holland alongside Sylvia Moy, "This Old Heart of Mine", produced by Brian Holland and Lamont Dozier, was originally intended for The Supremes (who later recorded their own version for their 1966 album The Supremes A' Go-Go). The single was the group's only major hit while on Motown, whom they left in 1969 to restart their own T-Neck label.

Tammi Terrell originally recorded the song in a different arrangement, but it was not released until her Irresistible album released in January 1969.

The song was prominently featured in an episode of the hit 1980s show Moonlighting and was one of the tunes included on the show's hit soundtrack.

== Personnel ==
- Lead vocals by Ronald Isley
- Background vocals by O'Kelly Isley Jr. and Rudolph Isley
- Additional background vocals by The Debonaires: Diane Hogan, Joyce Vincent, Dorothy Garland, Elsie Baker
- Written by Holland–Dozier–Holland and Sylvia Moy
- Produced by Brian Holland and Lamont Dozier
- Instrumentation by The Funk Brothers
  - Baritone saxophone by Mike Terry

== Certifications ==
Region	Certification	Certified units/sales
United Kingdom (BPI)	Platinum	600,000^{‡}
^{‡} Sales+streaming figures based on certification alone.

== Rod Stewart versions ==
"This Old Heart of Mine"

Single by Rod Stewart

from the album Atlantic Crossing
- B-side: "All In the Name of Rock 'n' Roll"
- Released: November 1975
- Length: 4:04
- Label: Riva
- Songwriters: Holland–Dozier–Holland, Sylvia Moy
- Producer: Tom Dowd

Rod Stewart singles chronology
"Sailing" (1975)	"This Old Heart of Mine" (1975)	"Tonight's the Night (Gonna Be Alright)" (1976)

"This Old Heart of Mine (Is Weak for You)"

Single by Rod Stewart with Ronald Isley

from the album Storyteller – The Complete Anthology: 1964–1990
- Released: October 30, 1989
- Length: 4:12
- Label: Warner Bros.
- Songwriters: Holland–Dozier–Holland, Sylvia Moy
- Producers: Bernard Edwards, Trevor Horn

Rod Stewart singles chronology
"Dynamite" (1989)	"This Old Heart of Mine (Is Weak for You)" (1989)	"Downtown Train" (1989)

In 1975, English singer Rod Stewart released a remake of this song that charted in several markets. In 1989, he released another version—this time a duet of the song with Ronald Isley that reached number two on Canada's RPM 100 Hit Tracks chart, number 10 on the US Billboard Hot 100, number one on the Adult Contemporary charts of both Billboard and RPM. The later version was produced by Bernard Edwards and Trevor Horn and was released on Warner Records. Record World said that Stewart's version "[remains] faithful to the original, yet [adds] enough rasp and thrust to call it all his own."

=== Charts ===
==== 1975 solo version ====
Chart (1975)	Peak position
Ireland (IRMA)	3
UK Singles (Official Charts)	4
US Billboard Hot 100	83
West Germany (GfK)	41

==== 1989 version with Ronald Isley ====
Weekly charts

Chart (1989–1990)	Peak position
Australia (ARIA)	94
Belgium (Ultratop 50 Flanders)	29
Canada Top Singles (RPM)	2
Canada Adult Contemporary (RPM)	1
Ireland (IRMA)	25
Italy Airplay (Music & Media)	7
Netherlands (Single Top 100)	49
UK Singles (Official Charts)	51
US Billboard Hot 100	10
US Adult Contemporary (Billboard)	1
West Germany (GfK)	51

Year-end charts

Chart (1990)	Position
Canada Top Singles (RPM)	22
Canada Adult Contemporary (RPM)	12
US Adult Contemporary (Billboard)	17
