= Lay-Away =

1972 single by the Isley Brothers

"Lay Away" is a 1972 funk rock single released by The Isley Brothers on their T-Neck imprint.

== Overview ==
Released as the first single from their album, Brother, Brother, Brother, the song depicts the narrator's description of how his lover's love was so special that he wanted to have for keeps just in case (hence the lyrics going back to get (your love) on a rainy day/your love is safe in my lay-away). The song took the riff of Honey Cone's "Want Ads", most noticeably in the bridges. The recording showcases brother Ernie on lead guitar for the first time on an Isley Brothers record. Written and produced by elder brothers O'Kelly, Rudolph and Ronald, the song peaked at number fifty-four on the Billboard Hot 100 and number six on the magazine's R&B singles chart in the spring of 1972.

== Personnel ==
- Lead vocals by Ronald Isley
- Background vocals by O'Kelly Isley, Jr. and Rudolph Isley
- Instrumentation by the Isley Brothers:
  - Ernie Isley: guitars
  - Chris Jasper: piano
  - Marvin Isley: bass guitar
- Other instrumentation by assorted musicians
