= Baby Makin' Music =

Studio album by the Isley Brothers
- Released: May 9, 2006
- Length: 40:45
- Labels: Def Soul Classics; Def Jam
- Producers: Gordon Chambers; Bryan-Michael Cox; Jermaine Dupri; R. Kelly; Ezekiel Lewis; Manuel Seal; Tim & Bob; Troy Taylor

The Isley Brothers chronology
Body Kiss (2003)	Baby Makin' Music (2006)	I'll Be Home for Christmas (2007)

Baby Makin' Music is a studio album by the American musical group the Isley Brothers. It was released under the short-lived Def Soul Classics imprint on May 9, 2006, in the United States. Crediting Ronald Isley as the group's bandleader, it involves production from a variety of producers, including Gordon Chambers, Jermaine Dupri, Tim & Bob, Ezekiel Lewis, Manuel Seal and R. Kelly.

Their first for the Def Jam-affiliated label, the album peaked at number five on the Billboard 200, while debuting at number one on the Top R&B/Hip-Hop Albums chart. Album sales were helped by the R&B chart success of the first single, "Just Came Here to Chill", and the R. Kelly duet, "Blast Off", which is the only collaboration with Kelly on this album, after he produced their last album, Body Kiss (2003).

Following the release of Baby Makin' Music and follow-up I'll Be Home for Christmas (2007), the Isley Brothers ended up on a temporary hiatus following lead singer Ronald Isley's conviction on tax evasion charges, having served three years in federal prison before being released in 2010 and releasing a solo album.

== Background ==
In October 2003, five months following the release of their predecessor, Body Kiss, which achieved commercial success, and almost a month ahead of the release of Ronald Isley and Burt Bacharach's collaborative album, Here I Am, the group's label, DreamWorks Records, previously a music label subsidiary of DreamWorks Pictures, was acquired by Universal Music Group and then folded into Interscope Geffen A&M Records. As a result, the Isley Brothers became free agents for only five months until in May 2004, former Universal Music CEO Doug Morris convinced the group to comeback to UMG. Accepting his offer, Ronald Isley signed a new contract with Universal, rather than face being dropped from the label and losing money. Instead of signing with DreamWorks' succeeding label, Geffen Records, Morris helped to sign the Isley Brothers to Geffen's UMG sister label, Def Soul, the R&B division of Def Jam Recordings. Around that time, Def Jam was already under new leadership of former Arista Records chairman L.A. Reid, following the departure of Lyor Cohen, Kevin Liles and its co-founder Russell Simmons.

== Critical reception ==
Professional ratings
Review scores
Source	Rating
About.com	4/5 stars
AllMusic	3.5/5 stars
Blender	2/5 stars
PopMatters	7/10

David Weigel from PopMatters found that "there are some forgettable songs mixed in with the hits, but the album hangs together well at the perfect procreative length of 46 minutes. The strongest tracks are the three that include a writing credit for Ron. They don’t contain any age jokes, or any silly sex talk; there’s nothing but class [...] With producers who know how to package their sound, and with Ron and Ernie’s skills performing at this level, the Isley Brothers are going to stay relevant for a long, long time." AllMusic editor Andy Kellman called Baby Makin' Music the group's "third strong album of the 2000s." He found that "the Isleys don't miss a step when it comes to staying up with the times [...] This is a remarkably tight album filled with songs that deliver on the promise of its title, and the songs that aren't immediately memorable at least make for fitting mood music. To no surprise whatsoever, Ronald is equally seductive whether he's making amends, bragging about his exploits, or just being sweet." Blender″s Baz Dreisinger found that "since nearly every track" on Baby Makin' Music "is about being there, doing that and turning it all around for a good woman’s love, that voice becomes tepid and tedious."

== Commercial performance ==
Baby Makin' Music was expected to be released on December 20, 2005, but was later delayed to May 9, 2006, on which it was finally released. the album debuted and peaked at number five on the US Billboard 200, with first week sales of 111,000 copies. It also opened at number one on the Top R&B/Hip-Hop Albums chart, becoming their tenth number-one album, tying them with Stevie Wonder and Aretha Franklin for the second-most chart toppers after the Temptations (with 17 chart toppers by then).

== Track listing ==
Baby Makin' Music track listing
No.	Title	Writer(s)	Producer(s)	Length
1.	"You're My Star"	Tim Kelley; Bob Robinson; Curtis Mayfield	Tim & Bob	4:35
2.	"Blast Off" (featuring R. Kelly)	Robert Kelly	Kelly	4:04
3.	"Just Came Here to Chill"	Troy Taylor; Gordon Chambers; Ronald Isley	Taylor; Chambers	4:13
4.	"Gotta Be with You"	Jermaine Dupri; Bryan-Michael Cox; Johntá Austin	Dupri; Cox^{[A]}	4:34
5.	"Pretty Woman"	Kelley; Robinson	Tim & Bob	4:31
6.	"Forever Mackin'"	Dupri; Cox; Austin	Dupri; Cox^{[A]}	4:22
7.	"Show Me"	Manuel Seal	Seal	4:22
8.	"Give It to You"	Seal	Seal	4:27
9.	"Beautiful"	Dupri; Seal; Austin	Dupri; Seal^{[A]}	3:27
10.	"Heaven Hooked Us Up"	Taylor; Ezekiel Lewis; Thabiso Nkhereanye; R. Isley	Lewis; Taylor	4:31
11.	"You Help Me Write This Song"	Taylor; Lewis; Nkhereanye; Sam Salter; R. Isley	Lewis; Taylor	4:02
Total length:				40:45

Notes

- ^{^[A]} denotes co-producer

Sample credits

- "You're My Star" contains samples from "Makings of You" as recorded by Gladys Knight & the Pips, written by Curtis Mayfield.

== Personnel ==
- Ronald Isley – lead and backing vocals, production, executive producer
- Ernie Isley – acoustic guitar (track 1), electric guitar (tracks 5, 10)
- R. Kelly – lead and backing vocals (track 2), arrangements, producer
- Donnie Lyle – guitar (track 2)
- Big D – guitar (track 10)
- Bob Robinson – additional keyboards (tracks 1, 5), arrangements, production
- Rodney East – additional keyboards (tracks 2)
- Tim Kelley – bass, keyboards & drums (tracks 1, 5), backing vocals (track 5), arrangements, production
- Jermaine Dupri – rapping, producer
- Manuel Seal – multi-instruments & backing vocals (tracks 7, 8), production
- Troy Taylor – multi-instruments, arrangements, production (tracks 3, 10, 11)
- Johnta Austin – backing vocals (tracks 4, 6, 9)
- Kandy Isley – backing vocals (tracks 1, 5)
- Ezekiel "Zeke" Lewis – production, backing vocals (tracks 10, 11)
- Sam Salter – backing vocals (track 11)
- Tyran "Ty Ty" Smith – executive producer

== Charts ==
=== Weekly charts ===
Weekly chart performance for Baby Makin' Music
Chart (2006)	Peak position
US Billboard 200	5
US Top R&B/Hip-Hop Albums (Billboard)	1

=== Year-end charts ===
Year-end chart performance for Baby Makin' Music
Chart (2006)	Position
US Billboard 200	181
US Top R&B/Hip-Hop Albums (Billboard)	33
