= Shout (Isley Brothers song) =

"Shout – Part 1"

Single by the Isley Brothers

from the album Shout!
- B-side: "Shout – Part 2"
- Released: August 1959
- Recorded: July 29, 1959
- Studio: RCA Victor, New York City
- Genre: Rock and roll; gospel; R&B
- Length: 2:15 (part 1); 2:10 (part 2)
- Label: RCA Victor
- Songwriters: O'Kelly Isley Jr.; Rudolph Isley; Ronald Isley
- Producer: Hugo & Luigi

The Isley Brothers singles chronology
| "I'm Gonna Knock on Your Door" (1959) | "Shout – Part 1" (1959) | "Respectable" (1960) |

"Shout" is a song written and originally recorded by American vocal group the Isley Brothers in 1959. Later versions include a cover by Scottish singer Lulu that peaked at No. 7 on the UK singles chart in 1964.

"Shout" was inducted to the Grammy Hall of Fame in 1999. Rolling Stone magazine ranked it at number 119 on its list of "The 500 Greatest Songs of All Time".

The song was featured in the 1978 comedy film Animal House and the 2025 supernatural film Final Destination Bloodlines.

== The Isley Brothers ==
In performances around 1958, the Isley Brothers would typically end their shows with a cover version of Jackie Wilson's hit "Lonely Teardrops". At one performance at the Uptown Theater in Philadelphia, lead singer Ronald Isley could see the audience standing and yelling their approval, so he extended the song by improvising a call-and-response around the words "You know you make me wanna..." "Shout!". The group developed the song further in later performances and rehearsals, using a drawn out "We-eee-ll" copied from Ray Charles' "I Got a Woman". On returning to New York City at the end of their engagement, they suggested to record producers Hugo & Luigi that they record the "Shout!" climax of the performance as a separate song. The producers agreed and suggested that the band invite friends to the recording studio to generate a party atmosphere.

The recording took place on July 29, 1959, at the RCA Victor Studios in New York City, with Hugo and Luigi choosing the studio musicians and the Isley Brothers inviting organist Herman Stephens. Released by RCA Victor in August 1959, with the song split over both sides of the record, the single reached number 47 on the Billboard Hot 100, becoming the group's first chart hit, and later the brothers' first gold single on the basis of its longevity. It reached number 44 in Canada. Ronald Isley later said that church groups wrote to radio stations asking them to stop playing the record, because of its use of a traditional black gospel sound.

== Other recordings ==
- One month after the initial release, Johnny O'Keefe performed the song on his Australian TV show Six O'Clock Rock. He released it as a single, which reached number 2 in Australia. His 1964 re-recording was only a minor hit at number 49.
- Joey Dee and the Starliters reached number 6 on the Billboard Hot 100 with their recording of the song in 1962. It begins with Joey Dee quietly speaking his suggestion to do a little bit of "Shout" before he begins singing, in which the group only covers the first part of the song, omitting the "Say you will" portions as well. They also reworked the chorus portion of the song into an even bigger hit, "Peppermint Twist", while the Isley Brothers' version re-charted that same year at number 94.
- In 1964, The Beatles recorded a version for the television special Around the Beatles, which was later collected on their album Anthology 1.
- In 1964, in the U.K., a version by Scottish pop singer Lulu reached number 7 (attributed to Lulu and the Luvvers). She re-recorded the song in 1986, and it reached number 8.
- In 1968, The Chambers Brothers had a hit with the song which got to no. 83 nationally.
- In 1977, 1978, and 1983 Tom Petty and the Heartbreakers covered the song during live performances over these years.
- Polaroid used a version of the song, retitled "Shoot", in a 1990s-era ad campaign.
- The National Football League (NFL)'s Buffalo Bills commissioned a version of "Shout" in 1987 with modified lyrics sung by jingle writer Scott Kemper. It has served as the team's official fight song ever since, except for a brief period in 1993 when Polaroid's worldwide licensing of the song for the aforementioned ad campaign led to a dispute over royalties, during which the team used a version of "Shout! Shout! (Knock Yourself Out)" by Ernie Maresca.
- Louchie Lou & Michie One recorded a ragga/rap version of the song, titled "Shout (It Out)", which reached number 7 on the UK chart in 1993.

== Charts ==
Chart performance for "Shout"
| Chart (1959) | Peak position |
|---|---|
| Canada (CHUM Hit Parade) | 44 |
| US Billboard Hot 100 | 47 |

== See also ==
- "Shout and Shimmy"
