= The Isley Brothers =

American musical group

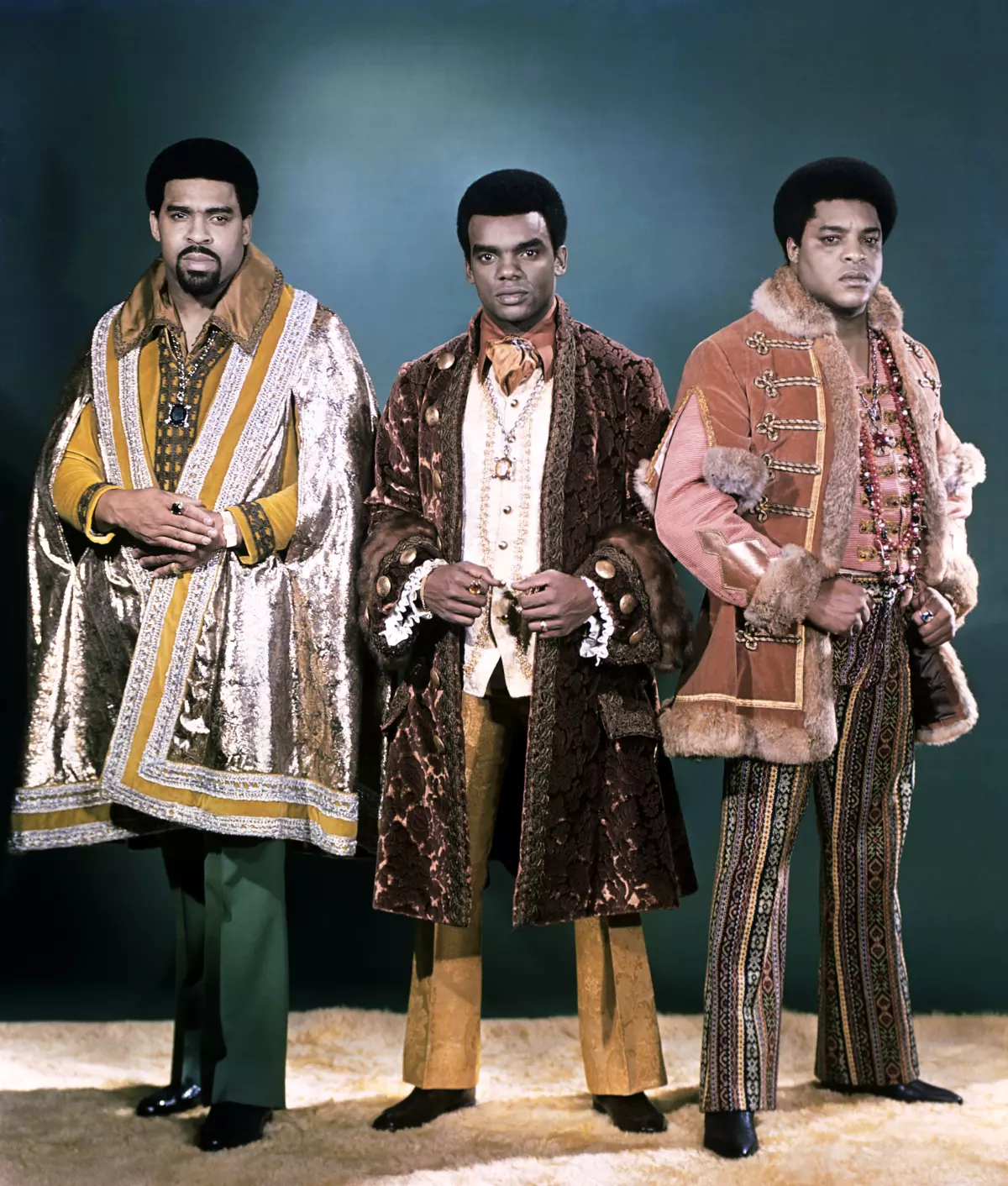
- The Isley Brothers in 1969; From left to right: Rudolph, Ronald, and O'Kelly Isley Jr.

Background information
- Also known as: The Isley Brothers featuring Ronald Isley AKA "Mr. Biggs"; The Isleys
- Origin: Cincinnati, Ohio, U.S.
- Genres: Soul; funk; R&B; rock
- Works: Discography
- Years active: 1954–present (hiatuses 1990–1991, 2007–2010)
- Labels: Wand; Motown; T-Neck; RCA Victor; Warner Bros.; Def Soul
- Spinoffs: Isley-Jasper-Isley
- Members: Ronald Isley; Ernie Isley
- Past members: Rudolph Isley; O'Kelly Isley Jr.; Vernon Isley; Marvin Isley; Chris Jasper
- Website: officialisleybrothers.com

The Isley Brothers (/ˈaɪzli/ EYEZ-lee) are an American soul group originally from Cincinnati, Ohio, that began in 1954 as four young brothers performing gospel music until the death of one brother that same year. The remaining trio—consisting of Ronald, Rudolph, and O'Kelly Isley Jr.—initially disbanded but then reformed, sparking a decades-long career with various lineups.

After moving to New York City in the late 1950s, the group had their first successes, rising to prominence in 1959 with their fourth single, "Shout", written by the three brothers, which became their first single to chart on the Billboard Hot 100 and sold over a million copies. In the 1960s, the group recorded songs for a variety of labels, including the top 20 single "Twist and Shout" and the Motown single "This Old Heart of Mine (Is Weak for You)", before recording and releasing the Grammy Award-winning hit "It's Your Thing" (1969) on their own label, T-Neck Records.

The inclusion of younger brothers Ernie Isley (lead guitar, drums) and Marvin Isley (bass guitar), as well as Rudolph's brother-in-law Chris Jasper (keyboards, synthesizers), in 1973 turned the original vocal trio into a complete band and led the group to the height of its success. For the next full decade, they recorded a string of top-selling albums including 3 + 3, Between the Sheets, and The Heat Is On, with the latter peaking at number one on the Billboard 200 chart. The six-member band splintered in 1983, with Ernie, Marvin, and Chris Jasper forming the short-lived spinoff group Isley-Jasper-Isley. The oldest member, O'Kelly, died in 1986. Afterwards Rudolph and Ronald released a pair of albums as a duo before Rudolph retired to a life in the Christian ministry in 1989. After multiple lineup changes, the remaining duo of Ronald and Ernie achieved mainstream success with the albums Mission to Please (1996), Eternal (2001) and Body Kiss (2003). Eternal spawned the top 20 hit "Contagious".

The Isley Brothers have sold over 18 million units in the United States alone. With their first major hit charting in 1959 ("Shout"), and their last one in 2001 ("Contagious"), they are among the few groups ever to have hit the Billboard Hot 100 with new music in six different decades and the only act in musical history to have achieved this accomplishment in consecutive decades. The group's long R&B chart span landed them a Guinness World Record in 2006. Sixteen of their albums charted in the Top 40 and thirteen have been certified gold, platinum or multi-platinum by the RIAA. The group has been honored by several musical institutions, including the Rock and Roll Hall of Fame, which inducted them in 1992; five years later, they were added to Hollywood's Rockwalk, and in 2003 they were inducted to the Vocal Group Hall of Fame. They received the Grammy Lifetime Achievement Award in 2014. Additionally, in the mid-1990s, their songs "Footsteps in the Dark" and "Between the Sheets" were sampled in the popular rap songs "It Was a Good Day" by Ice Cube and "Big Poppa" by the Notorious B.I.G., respectively.

== Career ==
=== Origins and initial recordings ===
The Isley Brothers originally came from Cincinnati, Ohio, and were raised in the city's Lincoln Heights suburb, settling in the satellite town of Blue Ash when they were teenagers. Their father, O'Kelly Isley Sr., a former United States Navy sailor and vaudeville performer from Durham, North Carolina, and their mother Sallye, from Georgia, guided the elder four Isley boys in their singing in church. The brothers—O'Kelly Isley Jr., Rudolph Isley, Ronald Isley, and Vernon Isley, began performing together in 1954, patterning themselves after groups such as Billy Ward and His Dominoes and The Dixie Hummingbirds. Eventually, they landed a spot on Ted Mack's Amateur Hour, where they won the competition (and were awarded a watch). With Ronald singing lead vocals, the quartet soon began touring all over the eastern United States, performing in a variety of churches. Still in 1954, when Vernon was eleven, he was killed by a car that struck him as he was riding his bike in his neighborhood. Devastated, the remaining trio disbanded.

Eventually persuaded to regroup, the brothers decided to record popular music and left Cincinnati for New York in 1957 with their parents' blessings. The group got in touch with Richard Barrett, who soon had them in contact with a variety of New York record producers. They eventually had their first recorded songs produced by George Goldner, including "Angels Cried" and "The Cow Jumped Over the Moon" for the Teenage, Cindy, and Mark X imprints. The songs were only regional hits, however. By 1959, the group had landed a recording deal with RCA Victor. Later that year, the group recorded their first composition together, "Shout", mixing their brand of gospel vocals and doo-wop harmonies, a song derived from a Washington, D.C., club performance in which the brothers had covered Jackie Wilson's "Lonely Teardrops". The original version of the song peaked at number 47 on the Billboard Hot 100 and never reached the R&B chart. Nevertheless, it sold over one million copies and was awarded a gold disc by the RIAA.

Follow-up recordings on RCA Victor failed to chart and the brothers were dropped by the label in 1961 and were later signed by Scepter Records. In 1962, the Isley Brothers scored their first top-40 hit with the Bert Berns song "Twist and Shout", which reached number 17 on the Hot 100 and number 2 on the R&B chart, staying on the charts for 19 weeks. The song had been produced by Berns for the brothers to teach then-struggling producer Phil Spector how to produce a hit.

Moving their entire operations to New Jersey, the brothers continued to struggle with recordings, and formed T-Neck Records in 1964.

In February or March 1964, at the recommendation of a former associate of Joe Tex, Ronnie Isley granted up-and-coming guitarist Jimi Hendrix an audition that led to an offer to become the guitarist with the Isley Brothers' backing band, the I.B. Specials, which he readily accepted. In March, Hendrix and the Isley Brothers recorded the two-part single "Testify", which was released in June but failed to chart. Hendrix toured with the Isleys during much of 1964, but near the end of October, he left the band after growing tired of playing the same set every night. (Note: According to authors Steve Roby and Brad Schreiber, Hendrix was fired from the Isleys in August 1964.) (Note: Soon afterward, Hendrix joined Little Richard's touring band, the Upsetters.) Hendrix briefly rejoined the Isley Brothers in late July or August 1965, recording a second single with them, "Move Over and Let Me Dance" backed with "Have You Ever Been Disappointed"; the single was recorded for and released by T-Neck and distributed by Atlantic Records. After both songs failed to chart and Hendrix left the Isleys for good in 1965, (Note: That year, Hendrix joined a New York-based R&B band, Curtis Knight and the Squires, before eventually launching a successful solo career.) the brothers signed with Motown Records. Early the following year, the group released their second Top-40 hit single, "This Old Heart of Mine (Is Weak for You)". While the Isley Brothers' recordings with Motown were more successful than their earlier works, they struggled to score a follow-up Top-40 hit with the label. They left Motown in 1968.

=== Major success ===
Resurrecting their T-Neck label that year, the brothers signed a distribution deal with Buddah Records and issued "It's Your Thing" in February 1969. The song, which featured the first appearance of Ernie Isley on bass, became their biggest success to date, reaching number 2 on the Hot 100 and number 1 on the R&B chart. The song's parent album, It's Our Thing, reached number 22 on the Pop LP chart, and "It's Your Thing" became the group's second million-seller and won them a Grammy Award. The release of "It's Your Thing" brought record label conflicts between the Isleys and Motown, as Motown argued that the group had recorded the song while still under their Motown contract. A 1975 court decision found in the Isleys' favor.

In June 1969, the brothers independently recorded their concert at Yankee Stadium which featured an array of artists. The live album Live at Yankee Stadium was released later that year. They also filmed the concert which was released as a documentary titled It's Your Thing in theaters in August 1970.

By 1971, the younger Isley brothers Ernie and Marvin and their brother-in-law Chris Jasper started to add to the band's music, first performing on the Isleys' Givin' It Back. The album featured reinterpretations of rock songs mixing them with funk and gospel elements. The new members played an even bigger role in the 1972 album, Brother, Brother, Brother. Both albums yielded Top 40 hits, including "Love the One You're With" and "Pop That Thang". By the end of their Buddah tenure in 1973, the brothers had signed a distribution deal with Epic Records and made Ernie, Marvin, and Chris official members. In 1973, the Isleys released 3 + 3, which included the Top 10 hit single "That Lady" and a UK Top 10 cover of "Summer Breeze". Incorporating hard rock and folk-rock as well as funk and soulful balladry, the album became their breakthrough hit, eventually selling over two million copies.

The following year, the album Live It Up also reached platinum. In 1975, the brothers made one of their most successful recordings, The Heat Is On, which featured the hits "Fight the Power" and "For the Love of You", and became their first album to reach number 1 on the Pop LP chart, going double-platinum at two million copies sold. The brothers would have more hit albums, including Harvest for the World (1976), Go for Your Guns (1977), and Showdown (1978), all of which went platinum, and yielded several Top 40 pop and R&B singles and popular radio cuts. By 1979, with the release of Winner Takes All, the brothers had incorporated disco and quiet storm music into their work. The Isley Brothers' final album under their six-member lineup, Between the Sheets (1983), sold more than two million copies.

By then, financial struggles, creative difficulties, and other issues affected the group. Shortly after the success of Between the Sheets, Ernie, Marvin, and Chris left the Isley Brothers and formed Isley-Jasper-Isley. They later recorded the hit "Caravan of Love".

=== Later years ===
In 1985, the original Isleys trio of O'Kelly, Rudy, and Ronnie signed with Warner Bros. Records and recorded and released the album Masterpiece. Shortly a year after its release, Kelly Isley died from a heart attack while battling cancer, in March 1986. The remaining duo of Ron and Rudy released the Angela Winbush-produced albums, Smooth Sailin' in 1987 and Spend the Night in 1989. Shortly after the latter release, Rudy retired from the music industry and followed life in the ministry.

Ron put the group on a brief hiatus in 1990 while he recorded solo material. In 1991, Ron revived the group; Ernie Isley and brother Marvin returned to the fold. that year they released the album, Tracks of Life. Five years later, Ron Isley gained popularity as video villain Frank Biggs (or Mr. Biggs) in the music video for R. Kelly's hit "Down Low (Nobody Has to Know)". The Isleys' 1996 release, Mission to Please, became successful, producing three charting singles—"Let's Lay Together", "Floatin' On Your Love" and "Tears"—all of which charted on the Billboard Hot 100 sixteen years after "Don't Say Goodnight" and made them just the third group in history to chart a hit single on the Hot 100 in four decades after the Rolling Stones and the Spinners. As a result, the album was certified platinum.

That same year, Marvin Isley's career ended after a bout with diabetes forced him to have both of his legs amputated. Ron and Ernie have carried on as a duo from then on. In 2001, the duo released their best-selling album in years with the Eternal album, which sold over two million copies and featured the top 20 hit single "Contagious", making the Isley Brothers the first act to reach the Hot 100 (in fact, that chart's top 50) during the 1950s, 1960s, 1970s, 1980s, 1990s, and 2000s. Two years later, the brothers' Body Kiss album peaked at number-one on the Billboard 200 album chart, becoming their second to reach the position and the first to do so since The Heat Is On. Their next two released albums included 2006's Baby Makin' Music and the 2007 holiday album I'll Be Home for Christmas.

In 2007, the Isleys' career was interrupted by Ron Isley's three-year prison sentence for tax evasion. He was released in 2010. In June of that year, youngest brother Marvin Isley died in Chicago after his longtime bout with diabetes. During the group's hiatus, Ernie toured as part of the Experience Hendrix concert festival, while Ron Isley released his first solo album, Mr. I, in 2010. A year later, Ron and Ernie reunited and have since performed on the road.

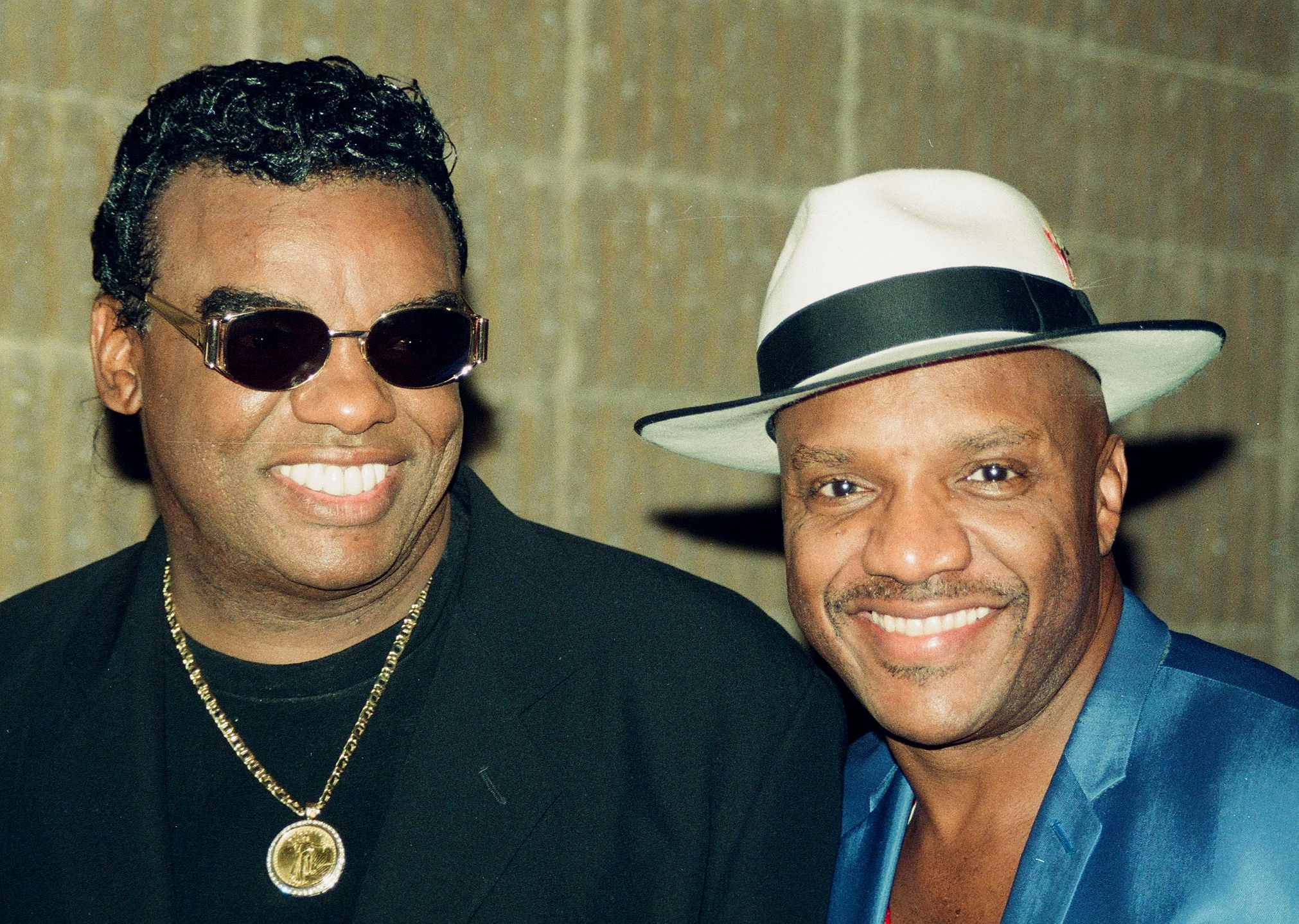
Ron and Ernie Isley in 1996

In 1993, the Isley Brothers song "Footsteps in the Dark" was sampled by hip-hop artist Ice Cube for the hit single "It Was a Good Day".

In 1994, the Isley Brothers song "Between the Sheets" was sampled by the Notorious B.I.G. for his hit single "Big Poppa". That same year, R&B singer Aaliyah included a cover version of "(At Your Best) You Are Love" on her debut album, Age Ain't Nothing but a Number. "Luxurious", the fifth single from No Doubt frontwoman Gwen Stefani's 2004 multi-platinum solo debut Love. Angel. Music. Baby. also benefited from a prominent sample of "Between the Sheets".

After the break-up of Isley-Jasper-Isley in 1987, Chris Jasper continued as a solo artist, multi-instrumentalist, and producer, forming his own independent record label, Gold City Records. He has since released 14 solo albums, including 4 gospel albums. He released the number one R&B hit "Superbad" in 1988, a song which emphasized the importance of education, a theme Jasper continues to emphasize in many of the songs he has written since his days with the Isleys. In January 2013, Jasper released Inspired: By Love, By Life, By the Spirit, a compilation of love songs as well as socially conscious and spiritual tracks. In May 2014, Jasper released The One, reminiscent of the soulful R&B and funk music he wrote for the Isleys. In 2016, Jasper released Share With Me, which included a cover of the Billy Preston hit, "You Are So Beautiful" and a track called "America", a tribute to the nation and a call to come together. In April 2018, Jasper pre-released a double-A single "The Love That You Give/It's a Miracle" from his 15th solo album Dance With You, scheduled for a July 2018 release.

Jasper, who earned a Juris Doctor in 2004, has continued to write, record, and perform all the music on his solo albums and produce artists for his Gold City label, including Liz Hogue, Out Front, and Brothaz By Choice. The most recent addition to the Gold City label is Jasper's son, Michael Jasper, a songwriter, recording artist and screenplay writer, who earned his law degree in 2018. In 1989, Chris Jasper wrote, produced and performed on "Make It Last" for Chaka Khan's CK album. In 2015, in conjunction with Sony Music, Jasper released the Essential Chris Jasper which encompasses all of the tracks that Jasper sang lead on during his Isley-Jasper-Isley years and solo career at CBS/Sony Music. In 2015, he received the German Record Critics Lifetime Achievement Award ("Preis der deutschen Schallplattenkritik"). In 2016, Jasper was awarded the National R&B Society Lifetime Achievement Award.

In 2017, the Isley Brothers (Ernie and Ronnie) collaborated with guitarist Santana (led by its namesake and founder Carlos Santana) and released Power of Peace, released on July 28 by Sony Music's Legacy Recordings. In 2019, Ron and Ernie Isley received the National R&B Music Society's Lifetime Achievement Award and Proclamations from the City of Atlantic City, while on stage in Atlantic City, NJ. In 2021 the brothers participated in a Verzuz with fellow R&B band Earth, Wind & Fire hosted by Steve Harvey, to celebrate both bands contributions to R&B & Pop music and African American culture.

On September 30, 2022, the Isley Brothers released a new album, titled Make Me Say It Again, Girl, duetting with Beyoncé on the title track.

In 2026, the Isley Brothers and David Kushner recorded the title track for the Paramount Pictures movie By Any Means, starring Mark Wahlberg. The song was written by Diane Warren — her first song to share a title with the accompanying film — and made The Isley Brothers the latest of more than 40 Rock and Roll Hall of Fame inductees to release a song written by her. A music video starring Ronald Isley, Ernie Isley, David Kushner, with a cameo by Diane was directed by Fran Strine and released on September 6, 2026. The clip won Best Music Video, presented by Jimmy Jam, at the 17th Hollywood Music in Media Awards. The ceremony opened with The Isley Brothers and David Kushner performing a "By Any Means" and "Shout" medley — underscoring the Isleys' 67 years of releasing original music, and progress made by the Civil rights movement, since their 1959 debut — backed by Warren and fellow By Any Means: The Album artists Pynk Beard, Steve Ray Ladson, and Elsie.

== Musical style and influences ==
Influenced by gospel and doo-wop music, the group experimented with different musical styles over the course of their career, starting out in rock and roll before shifting their sound to soul music, then funk and funk rock. The group has also performed rhythm and blues and pop ballads.

== Awards and nominations ==
The Isley Brothers were inducted the Rock and Roll Hall of Fame in 1992. In 1997, they were inducted into Hollywood's Rockwalk, and in 2003 they were inducted to the Vocal Group Hall of Fame. In January 2026, the group was set to receive a star on the Hollywood Walk of Fame. The group has sold over 18 million units in the United States alone.

With their first major hit charting in 1959 ("Shout"), and their last one in 2001 ("Contagious"), they are among the few groups ever to have hit the Billboard Hot 100 with new music in six different decades and the only act in musical history to have achieved this accomplishment in consecutive decades, doing so from the 1950s until the 2000s. In 2006, the group was noted by Guinness World Records as holding the long R&B chart span of 45 years.

=== Grammy Awards ===
The Isley Brothers have won two Grammy Awards, including the Grammy Lifetime Achievement Award. Two of their songs are inducted into the Grammy Hall of Fame.

Year	Nominee / work	Award	Result
1970	"It's Your Thing"	Best R&B Vocal Performance by a Duo or Group	Won
2002	"Contagious"	Best R&B Performance by a Duo or Group with Vocal	Nominated
2004	"Busted"	Best R&B Performance by a Duo or Group with Vocal	Nominated
2004	Body Kiss	Best R&B Album	Nominated
2014	Isley Brothers	Grammy Lifetime Achievement Award	Won

==== Grammy Hall of Fame ====
Year	Nominee / work	Award	Result
1999	"Shout"	Hall of Fame (Single)	Inducted
2010	"Twist and Shout"	Hall of Fame (Single)	Inducted

== Members ==
Current members

- Ronald Isley – lead vocals (1954–present)
- Ernie Isley – guitars, bass, drums, percussion (1973–1984, 1991–present; guest 1969–1973)

Former members

- Vernon Isley – backing vocals (1954; his death)
- Rudolph Isley – backing vocals (1954–1989, 2004; died 2023)
- O'Kelly Isley Jr. – backing vocals (1954–1986; his death)
- Marvin Isley – bass (1973–1984, 1991–1997; guest 1969–1970, 1971–1973; died 2010)
- Chris Jasper – keyboards, backing vocals, conducted string arrangements, guitars, bass, percussion (1973–1984; guest 1969, 1971–1973; died 2025)

== Discography ==
Studio albums

- Shout! (1959)
- Twist & Shout (1962)
- Twisting and Shouting (1963)
- This Old Heart of Mine (1966)
- Soul on the Rocks (1967)
- It's Our Thing (1969)
- The Brothers: Isley (1969)
- Get into Something (1970)
- Givin' It Back (1971)
- Brother, Brother, Brother (1972)
- 3 + 3 (1973)
- Live It Up (1974)
- The Heat Is On (1975)
- Harvest for the World (1976)
- Go for Your Guns (1977)
- Showdown (1978)
- Winner Takes All (1979)
- Go All the Way (1980)
- Grand Slam (1981)
- Inside You (1981)
- The Real Deal (1982)
- Between the Sheets (1983)
- Masterpiece (1985)
- Smooth Sailin' (1987)
- Spend the Night (1989)
- Tracks of Life (1992)
- Mission to Please (1996)
- Eternal (2001)
- Body Kiss (2003)
- Baby Makin' Music (2006)
- Power of Peace (2017)
- Make Me Say It Again, Girl (2022)

== Sources ==
- Heatley, Michael (2009). Jimi Hendrix Gear: The Guitars, Amps & Effects that Revolutionized Rock 'n' Roll. Voyageur Press. ISBN 978-0-7603-3639-7.
- Hendrix, Janie L.; McDermott, John (2007). Jimi Hendrix: An Illustrated Experience. Atria. ISBN 978-0-7432-9769-1.
- McDermott, John (2009). Ultimate Hendrix: An Illustrated Encyclopedia of Live Concerts and Sessions. BackBeat Books. ISBN 978-0-87930-938-1.
- Roby, Steven; Schreiber, Brad (2010). Becoming Jimi Hendrix: From Southern Crossroads to Psychedelic London, the Untold Story of a Musical Genius. Da Capo. ISBN 978-0-306-81910-0.
- Shadwick, Keith (2003). Jimi Hendrix: Musician. Backbeat Books. ISBN 978-0-87930-764-6.
- Shapiro, Harry; Glebbeek, Caesar (1995) [1990]. Jimi Hendrix: Electric Gypsy (New and Improved ed.). St. Martin's Press. ISBN 978-0-312-13062-6.
