= For the Love of You =

Single by the Isley Brothers

from the album The Heat Is On
- Released: September 22, 1975
- Recorded: 1975
- Studio: Kendun Recorders, Burbank, California
- Genre: Smooth soul
- Length: 5:38 (album version); 4:44 (7" edit)
- Label: T-Neck/Epic
- Songwriters: Ernie Isley; Marvin Isley; Rudolph Isley; O'Kelly Isley; Ronald Isley; Chris Jasper
- Producer: The Isley Brothers

The Isley Brothers singles chronology
"Fight the Power (Part 1 & 2)" (1975)	"For the Love of You" (1975)	"Harvest for the World" (1976)

"For the Love of You" (sometimes titled "For the Love of You (Part 1 & 2)") is a song recorded by the Isley Brothers, who released the song as the second single off their 1975 album, The Heat Is On. The record showcased the two sides of the act, with the album's first single "Fight the Power" reflecting a fast-paced funk vibe while showcasing a ballad side on the latter. The song later became a crossover hit for the brothers.

== Release ==
"For the Love of You" was released in September 1975, after the success of its predecessor, "Fight the Power", had started to dwindle, leading to a drop of the charts. "For the Love of You" nearly repeated the success of its predecessor, reaching #22 on the Billboard Hot 100, giving the brothers the rarity of having two top 40 singles off one album as opposed to one every album, marking it as the first time that had happened since the 1972 album, Brother, Brother, Brother, where two top 40 singles emerged from that album ("Work to Do" and "Pop That Thang"). The song peaked at #10 on Billboard's R&B chart.

The song's success was contributed to the album's sequencing in which the harder, funk and rock-oriented first three tracks were placed on side one, while the more melodic, sensual soul ballads were placed on side two. As a result of the success of "For the Love of You", R&B radio began playing the album's other two ballads regularly – "Sensuality" and the album's swan song, "Make Me Say It Again, Girl". Since then, all three of the songs from the album's second side continued to get play on quiet storm radio playlists.

== Cover versions and samples ==
=== Covers ===
- In 1976, South African flugelhornist Hugh Masekela covered the song for his eighteenth studio album, Colonial Man.
- In 1986, American guitarist Earl Klugh covered the song on his album, Life Stories.
- In 1987, Whitney Houston covered the song on her second studio album, Whitney. The song features as the B-side on the third single "So Emotional", released on November 12, 1987. Her cover version earned a nomination for Best Female R&B Vocal Performance at the 1988 Grammy Awards. Later, in 1993, it was the b-side of "Run to You" from The Bodyguard, and as a result was heavily played on R&B radio stations in the United States that year. Houston's version reached the top 40 of the music charts in New Zealand in 1996, reaching number 35.
- In 1994, Jazz musician Norman Brown covered the song, which appeared on his album, After the Storm.
- In 1995, American singer/actor Jason Weaver covered the song on his only studio album Love Ambition and Weaver's version was produced by J.R. Swinga.
- In 1997, saxophonist Candy Dulfer covered the song on her third album, which also used the song's title.
- In 1999, Filipina singer Regine Velasquez (with Gabby Eigenmann and KC Montero) covered the song on her tenth studio album, R2K.
- In 2002, the British group Hil St. Soul covered the song on their album Copasetik & Cool.
- In 2003, Joss Stone covered the song for her debut album The Soul Sessions.
- In 2004, Regina Belle (with background vocal group the Perry Sisters) covered the song in a medley with "The Love I Lost" by Harold Melvin & the Blue Notes for her album, Lazy Afternoon.
- In 2024, Cyrille Aimée covered the song for her album à Fleur de Peau, produced by Jake Sherman.

=== Samples ===
- "For the Love of You" was sampled by Masta Ace in his song entitled "The I.N.C. Ride",
- 3 E Oeil sampled the song for their song "Laise Toi Aller".
- 504 Boyz sampled the song on "I Gotta Have That There" off their 2002 album Ballers.
- Murs sampled the song in "Me and This Jawn" from his Murs for President album in 2008.
- Poison Clan sampled the song in "Ho Stories" from their Poisonous Mentality album in 1992.
- Tupac Shakur sampled the song in "Bury Me a G" from the Thug Life, Volume I album in 1994.
- Smooth sampled the song in "Mind Blowin'" from the Smooth album in 1995.

== Credits ==
Credits are adapted from the album's liner notes.

- Ronald Isley: lead vocals
- O'Kelly Isley, Jr.: background vocals
- Rudolph Isley: background vocals
- Ernie Isley: six-string & twelve-string acoustic guitars, drums, background vocals
- Marvin Isley: bass guitar, background vocals
- Chris Jasper: electric piano, ARP synthesizer, background vocals
- Produced, written, arranged and composed by the Isley Brothers
