= Between the Sheets (Isley Brothers album) =

Studio album by the Isley Brothers
- Released: April 24, 1983
- Recorded: November 1982 – February 1983
- Studio: Bearsville (Woodstock, New York)
- Genres: Quiet storm; funk; R&B; funk rock; smooth soul
- Length: 46:16
- Label: T-Neck Records
- Producer: The Isley Brothers

The Isley Brothers chronology
The Real Deal (1982)	Between the Sheets (1983)	Greatest Hits, Vol. 1 (1984)

Singles from Between the Sheets
- 1. "Between the Sheets" Released: March 9, 1983; 2. "Choosey Lover" Released: 1983; 3. "I Need Your Body" Released: 1983; 4. "Let's Make Love Tonight" Released: 1984

Between the Sheets is the 22nd album released by the Isley Brothers on their T-Neck imprint on April 24, 1983. The album is notable for the title track, the follow-up hit "Choosey Lover", and the ballad "Touch Me".

== Background ==
Professional ratings
Review scores
Source	Rating
Allmusic	3/5 stars

The Isley Brothers recorded songs for the album to react to disappointing sales of their albums, Inside You and The Real Deal, albums that failed to sell and produced no hit singles. The group returned to Bearsville Studios in November 1982 to work on the album. Like previous albums, all the instrumentation and composition was handled by Chris Jasper, Ernie Isley and younger brother Marvin. Some songs were initially devised as songs for a splinter project the trio were working on. Eventually, however, lead singer Ronald Isley sought interest in a few of the tracks, including the title song, which was composed by the trio of Jasper and the younger Isley brothers in response to Marvin Gaye's hit, "Sexual Healing".

Adding additional composition, Ronald helped to compose "Choosey Lover" with the younger brothers with the melody based on Earth, Wind & Fire's "Devotion". Other songs reflected on social commentary included "Slow Down Children", aimed at inner city youth, and the anti-war song, "Ballad for the Fallen Soldier". Most of the album featured Jasper's background vocals accompanied by Ron Isley's lead vocals. Most of the album's vocals were contributed by Ron, Jasper and the younger Isleys Ernie and Marvin with minimal background accompaniment by the elder brothers Kelly and Rudy.

== Release ==
Released the following April, the album returned the Isleys to the top of the R&B album charts and also peaked at number 19 on the Billboard 200. Both "Between the Sheets" and "Choosey Lover" became top ten hits on the R&B charts with "Between the Sheets" performing below the Hot 100. "Ballad for the Fallen Soldier" and "Let's Make Love Tonight" were released as promotional singles. Although it was not a single, the ballad "Touch Me" was also a hit. Eventually the album was certified platinum by the Recording Industry Association of America for shipments of one million copies alone in the United States. There is a music video for the song Ballad for the Soldier.

The following year, due to tax problems the three elder Isley members were dealing with at the time, Ernie, Marvin and Chris Jasper left the group and formed Isley-Jasper-Isley.

== Track listing ==
All tracks are written by Ernie Isley, Marvin Isley, Chris Jasper, Rudolph Isley, O'Kelly Isley and Ronald Isley.

Side One
No.	Title	Length
1.	"Choosey Lover"	4:41
2.	"Touch Me"	5:11
3.	"I Need Your Body"	4:39
4.	"Between the Sheets"	5:39
5.	"Let's Make Love Tonight"	4:48

Side Two
No.	Title	Length
6.	"Ballad for the Fallen Soldier"	5:18
7.	"Slow Down Children"	4:21
8.	"Way Out Love"	4:11
9.	"Gettin' Over"	3:44
10.	"Rock You Good"	3:34

2011 reissue bonus tracks
No.	Title	Length
11.	"Between the Sheets" (Instrumental Version)	4:56
12.	"Choosey Lover" (Instrumental Version)	4:42
13.	"I Need Your Body" (Instrumental Version)	4:36
14.	"Let's Make Love Tonight" (Instrumental Version)	4:46
15.	"Between the Sheets" (Single Version)	4:54

== Personnel ==
- Ronald Isley – lead vocals (1–9), backing vocals (1, 3–5, 8)
- O'Kelly Isley, Jr. – backing vocals (2, 3, 6, 7)
- Rudolph Isley – backing vocals (2, 3, 6, 7)

With:

- Chris Jasper – acoustic piano, keyboards, synthesizers, vocoder, percussion, backing vocals (1, 3–5, 8, 9), rap (3, 6), co-lead vocals (8), lead vocals (10)
- Ernie Isley – guitars, drums, percussion, backing vocals (1, 3–5, 8, 9)
- Marvin Isley – bass, percussion, backing vocals (1, 3–5, 8, 9)

== Charts ==
Chart (1983)	Peak position
Billboard Pop Albums	19
Billboard Top Soul Albums	1

=== Singles ===
Year	Single	Chart positions
Year	Single	US R&B
1983	"Between the Sheets"	3
1983	"Choosey Lover"	6

== Certifications ==
Region	Certification	Certified units/sales
United States (RIAA)	Platinum	1,000,000^{^}
^{^} Shipments figures based on certification alone.

== Samples and covers ==
- The Notorious B.I.G. sampled "Between the Sheets" on his song "Big Poppa" from his 1994 album Ready to Die.
- Nas sampled "Choosey Lover" for the remix version of his single "Street Dreams" from his second album It Was Written (1996). In addition to the sample, its lyrics were also interpolated by the single's guest artist R. Kelly.
- Keith Murray sampled "Between the Sheets" on his song "The Most Beautifullest Thing in This World" on his album The Most Beautifullest Thing in This World in 1994.
- Da Brat sampled "Between the Sheets" on her song "Funkdafied" on her album Funkdafied in 1994.
- Ex Girlfriend sampled "Between the Sheets" on their song "X In Your Sex (X Between The Sheets - F.F. Remix)" on their album "It's A Woman Thang" in 1994.
- Skee-Lo sampled “Between the Sheets” on his song Superman on his album I Wish in 1995.
- Aaliyah sampled "Between the Sheets" on her song "Old School" and covered "Choosey Lover" on her album One in a Million in 1996.
- Jay-Z sampled "Ballad for the Fallen Soldier" on his song "A Week Ago" on his album Vol. 2... Hard Knock Life in 1998.
- Jay-Z sampled "Between the Sheets" on his song "Ignorant Sh*t" on his album American Gangster in 2007.
- Kool G Rap sampled "Ballad for the Fallen Soldier" on his song "Cannon Fire" from his album Roots of Evil in 1998.
- Whitney Houston sampled "Between the Sheets" on her song One of Those Days from her 2002 album Just Whitney.
- Gwen Stefani sampled "Between the Sheets" on her song "Luxurious" from her 2004 album Love. Angel. Music. Baby.
- Chance the Rapper sampled “Between the Sheets” on his song “Juke Juke” on his mixtape “10 Day” in 2012.
- DJ Khaled sampled Ballad for the Fallen Soldier in his song Billy Ocean in 2017.
- Big K.R.I.T sampled “Between the Sheets” on his song “Pick your self” on his album “TDT” in 2018.
