= Livin' in the Life =

Single by The Isley Brothers

from the album Go for Your Guns
- B-side: "Go for Your Guns"
- Released: 1977
- Recorded: 1977
- Studio: Bearsville (Woodstock, New York)
- Genre: Funk, funk rock, rock
- Length: 4:13
- Label: T-Neck/Epic
- Songwriter(s): The Isley Brothers
- Producer(s): The Isley Brothers

The Isley Brothers singles chronology
"The Pride" (1977)	"Livin' in the Life" (1977)	"Voyage to Atlantis" (1977)

"Livin' in the Life" is the second song released from The Isley Brothers' 1977 album, Go for Your Guns. It was also the next-to-last song on the album, which only included seven tracks, with the last track actually a "part two" version of the song under the title of the album, in which was led by Ernie Isley, brother Marvin and Chris Jasper.

Much like the band's 1975 hit, "Fight the Power", it was written by Ernie Isley and, in some parts, lead singer Ronald Isley and his brothers, Rudolph and Kelly, tripled in unison lead vocals though Ronald remained the dominant vocalist over the three. Ronald also helps close out the ending of the album before it fades.

The song became a hit on the R&B and dance charts, reaching #4 on the former, while also crossing over on the top 40 of the pop charts, reaching #40, making it their first top 40 pop hit in little over two years.

== Credits ==
Credits are adapted from the album’s Liner notes

- Vocals by Ronald Isley, Rudolph Isley and O'Kelly Isley Jr.
- Drums and Guitars by Ernie Isley
- Bass by Marvin Isley
- Keyboards by Chris Jasper
