= The Pride (Isley Brothers song) =

"The Pride (Part I & II)"

Single by The Isley Brothers

from the album Go For Your Guns
- B-side: "The Pride (Part II)"
- Released: 1977
- Recorded: 1976
- Studio: Bearsville (Woodstock, New York)
- Genre: Funk
- Length: 5:34
- Label: T-Neck; 2262
- Songwriter(s): Rudolph Isley; O'Kelly Isley; Ronald Isley; Ernie Isley; Marvin Isley; Chris Jasper
- Producer(s): The Isley Brothers

The Isley Brothers singles chronology
"Harvest for the World" (1976)	"The Pride (Part I & II)" (1977)	"Livin' in the Life" (1977)

"The Pride" is a 1977 funk song by The Isley Brothers, released on their T-Neck imprint. The song, which was the first single released from their album, Go For Your Guns, was written as a warning to politicians to be the leader that the people need and to others who want change reminding them that "the pride makes (them) feel that (they) belong". The song was one of several socially conscious political songs the Isleys recorded throughout the 1970s including "Fight the Power Pts. 1 & 2" and "Harvest for the World". While the song peaked at sixty-three on the pop charts, it reached number-one on the R&B singles chart becoming the group's third number one on the chart.

== Personnel ==
- Ronald Isley: lead vocals, background vocals
- Rudolph Isley: background vocals
- O'Kelly Isley Jr.: background vocals
- Ernie Isley: drums, congas, electric guitar, background vocals
- Marvin Isley: bass played by, background vocals
- Chris Jasper: tambourine, piano, clavinet, keyboards, synthesizers, background vocals
