= Live It Up (Isley Brothers song) =

"Live it Up"

Single by the Isley Brothers

from the album Live It Up
- Released: 1974
- Genre: R&B, soul, funk
- Length: 6:14
- Label: T-Neck
- Songwriter(s): Rudolph Isley, O'Kelly Isley, Ronald Isley, Ernie Isley, Marvin Isley and Chris Jasper

The Isley Brothers singles chronology
"Highway of My Life" (1974)	"Live it Up" (1974)	"Midnight Sky (Part 1)" (1974)

"Live It Up, Pt. 1 & 2" is a funk/rock song released by the Isley Brothers, on their album of the same name in 1974 on their T-Neck imprint.

== Overview ==
The song attacked conformity and advocated control, and it was much like some of the group's "Do What You Wanna Do" records of the time. This song's free-love message helped it become an R&B smash upon its release. Ronald's gritty vocals are helped by his brothers' rambunctious and testosterone-driven background vocals. The song also features a screaming guitar solo from Ernie, and Chris closes it with a clavinet solo.

Part one is the vocal version, featuring lead singer Ronald and his accompanying backup singing brothers Rudolph and O'Kelly. Part two is the instrumental version.

This song was included on the album Live It Up, which was a popular recording upon its release in 1974. Like many of the songs on the album, the title song was one of the most overlooked hit recordings by the brothers.

== Personnel ==
Instrumental credits based on original album Liner notes
Music Programming & Vocal credits based on Liner notes for the 1999 Greatest Hits album It's Your Thing

Isley Brothers

- Ronald Isley: lead and background vocals
- O'Kelly Isley Jr. and Rudolph Isley: background vocals
- Ernie Isley: electric guitar, drums, background vocals
- Marvin Isley: bass guitar, background vocals
- Chris Jasper: electric piano, ARP synthesizers, clavinet, background vocals

Additional Musicians

- Malcolm Cecil: synthesizer programming
- Robert Margouleff: synthesizer programming

== Chart performance ==
"Live It Up" peaked at number four on the Hot Soul Singles chart and reached number fifty-two on the Hot 100 chart.
