= Take Me to the Next Phase =

"Take Me to the Next Phase (Part 1)"

Single by The Isley Brothers

from the album Showdown
- B-side: "Take Me to the Next Phase (Part 2)" "Tell Me When You Need it Again" (12" single)
- Released: March 1978
- Genre: R&B, Funk
- Length: 6:05 (extended 12" version); 5:10 (album version); 4:12 (radio edit)
- Label: T-Neck; 2272
- Songwriter(s): Rudolph Isley; O'Kelly Isley, Jr. Ronald Isley; Ernie Isley; Marvin Isley; Chris Jasper
- Producer(s): The Isley Brothers

The Isley Brothers singles chronology
"Voyage to Atlantis" (1977)	"Take Me to the Next Phase (Part 1)" (1978)	"Groove with You" (1978)

"Take Me to the Next Phase (Part 1)" was a hit song for R&B/funk band The Isley Brothers. The song has the sound of a live stadium recording, but it was created entirely in a recording studio. Ernie and Marvin Isley plus Chris Jasper laid the foot stomps and some of the crowd noises across 24 recording tracks. Released from their platinum selling 1978 album, Showdown (Isley Brothers album), the single spent 2 weeks at number one on the R&B singles chart. However, it never managed to cross over to the Billboard Hot 100 singles chart.
