= Don't Say Goodnight (It's Time for Love) =

"Don't Say Goodnight (It's Time for Love) (Parts 1 & 2)"

Single by the Isley Brothers

from the album Go All the Way
- B-side: "Don't Say Goodnight (It's Time for Love) (Parts 1 & 2) (Instrumental)"
- Released: 1980
- Recorded: 1980
- Studio: Bearsville Studios, Woodstock, New York
- Genre: Soul, quiet storm
- Length: 5:45
- Label: T-Neck; 2290
- Songwriter(s): Ernie Isley, Marvin Isley, Chris Jasper, Rudolph Isley, O'Kelly Isley, Jr., Ronald Isley
- Producer(s): The Isley Brothers

The Isley Brothers singles chronology
"It's a Disco Night (Rock Don't Stop)" (1979)	"Don't Say Goodnight (It's Time for Love) (Parts 1 & 2)" (1980)	"Here We Go Again (Part 1)" (1980)

"Don't Say Goodnight (It's Time for Love)" is a 1980 soul and quiet storm record by the Isley Brothers, released on their T-Neck imprint. The track was released as the first single from their 1980 platinum album, Go All the Way.

== Song background ==
The song, which was released as an answer of sorts to Teddy Pendergrass' hit "Turn Off the Lights" was an ode to love sung by Ronald Isley, who begs his lady in his trademark tenor to give him her love, stating if "people say that love is for the giving/so lemme love you, girl".

== Chart performance ==
The song was also their last Top 40 pop hit in 16 years, peaking at number 39 pop while reaching number one on the R&B singles chart.

== Personnel ==
- Ronald Isley: lead and background vocals
- O'Kelly Isley Jr. and Rudolph Isley: background vocals
- Ernie Isley: guitars, drums
- Marvin Isley: bass
- Chris Jasper: keyboards, piano, string synthesizers
