= The Real Deal (Isley Brothers album) =

Studio album by the Isley Brothers
- Released: August 7, 1982
- Recorded: 1982
- Studios: Bearsville (Woodstock, New York); Conway (Hollywood, California) (vocal overdubs); Penny Lane (New York City, New York) (strings)
- Genres: Funk, electro-funk, smooth soul
- Length: 37:50
- Label: T-Neck Records
- Producer: The Isley Brothers

The Isley Brothers chronology
Inside You (1981)	The Real Deal (1982)	Between the Sheets (1983)

The Real Deal is the 21st album by the Isley Brothers, released on August 7, 1982. The album is notable for the group's decision to alter their trademark funk rock sound in the 1970s with the then-current early 1980s electro funk scene dominated by Rick James, Prince, Zapp and the Gap Band.

== Background ==
Professional ratings
Review scores
Source	Rating
AllMusic	3/5 stars

Following the releases of two 1981 albums, the gold-selling Grand Slam and the lesser-successful Inside You, the Isley Brothers were finding themselves in a rut following a successful nine-year run of gold and platinum albums and a succession of hit singles that had made them one of the top-selling R&B/funk bands of the 1970s. After hearing the sounds of the Gap Band and Rick James, The Isleys (Kelly, Rudy, Ron, Ernie and Marvin) and brother-in-law Chris Jasper, whose role in the Isleys had grown to the point where he was adding background vocals himself alongside longtime lead vocalist Ron Isley and also added in a vocoder co-lead while playing synthesizers, which sometimes was overdubbed atop Marvin Isley's bass guitar riffs.

== Reception ==
For their next album, 1982's The Real Deal, the group went for a more minimalist funk sound with the title track, which hit the top 20 of the R&B charts, Ron Isley, Ernie Isley and Chris Jasper showcase "Stone Cold Lover", the vocoderized "Are You With Me", the mid-tempo "It's Alright With Me" (with Chris Jasper being the only other vocalist beside Ron Isley singing on the song) with the smoother pop rock ballad "All in My Lover's Eyes", which peaked at number sixty-seven on the R&B chart in 1983, while Ron and Ernie are showcased heavy on the Jimi Hendrix-inspired "Under the Influence", which showcased a more bluesier approach than the group was used to. Despite hopes that the album will bring the Isleys back to the top of the charts, it stalled at number 87 on the Billboard 200. A year later the group will bounce back with Between the Sheets, which became the last album to feature Chris Jasper. Though younger brothers Ernie and Marvin would also depart, forming Isley-Jasper-Isley with Jasper, they eventually returned to the Isley Brothers fold in 1992 following the death of eldest brother Kelly Isley and the exit of Rudolph Isley. Ronald Isley has since remained the group's most consistent of the members.

== Track listing ==
All tracks are written by Ernie Isley, Marvin Isley, Chris Jasper, Rudolph Isley, O'Kelly Isley and Ronald Isley.

Side one
No.	Title	Length
1.	"The Real Deal (Part I and II)"	7:03
2.	"Are You with Me?"	4:48
3.	"Stone Cold Lover"	5:12
Total length:		17:03

Side two
No.	Title	Length
4.	"It's Alright with Me"	5:32
5.	"All in My Lover's Eyes"	5:13
6.	"I'll Do It All for You"	4:20
7.	"Under the Influence"	5:42
Total length:		20:47

== Personnel ==
- Ronald Isley - Lead and Background vocals
- Rudolph Isley - Background vocals
- O'Kelly Isley - Background vocals
- Chris Jasper - Keyboards, Percussion, Vocoder, Co-lead vocals on "It's Alright with Me" and background vocals
- Ernie Isley - Drums, Guitar, Percussion, Backing Vocals
- Marvin Isley - Bass, Percussion, Backing Vocals
- Kevin Jones - Congas
- Everett Collins - Drums
- Fred Zlotkin, Jonathan Abramowitz - Cello
- Fred Buldrini, Gerald Tarrak, Guy Lumia, Harold Kohon, Harry Lookofsky, Marilyn Wright, Winterton Garvey - Violin
- Alfred V. Brown, Mitsue Takayama - Viola

== Charts ==
Chart (1982)	Peak position
Billboard Pop Albums	87
Billboard Top Soul Albums	9

=== Singles ===
Year	Single	Chart positions
Year	Single	US R&B
1982	"The Real Deal"	14
1982	"It's Alright With Me"	59
1982	"All In My Lover's Eyes"	67

== Samples ==
69 Boyz sampled "All In My Lover's Eyes" on their song "Strip Club Luv" on their album The Wait Is Over in 1998.
