= Murs for President =

Studio album by Murs
- Released: September 30, 2008
- Recorded: 2007–2008
- Genre: Hip-hop
- Length: 60:09
- Label: Warner Bros.
- Producer: Ted "Wild Animals" Chung (also exec.); 9th Wonder; Keith Harris; will.i.am; Mr. Khaliyl; DJ Quik (add.); Terrace Martin; Nottz; Josef Leimberg; Scoop DeVille; Knotch; LT Moe

Murs chronology
Sweet Lord (2008)	Murs for President (2008)	Fornever (2010)

Professional ratings
Review scores
Source	Rating
AllMusic	3.5/5 stars
The A.V. Club	(B)
ChartAttack	4.5/5 stars
DJBooth.net	3.5/5 stars
Entertainment Weekly	B
Okayplayer	82/100
RapReviews.com	8.0/10 stars
Robert Christgau	(1-star Honorable Mention)
Spin	4/5 stars

Murs for President is the sixth studio album by American emcee Murs. The album was released on September 30, 2008, under Warner Bros. Records, making this his only album to date to be released under a major label.

== Release ==
The album debuted at No. 45 on Billboard 200 and No. 11 on Rap Albums, with 12,000 copies sold in its first week. It has sold 58,000 copies in the United States as of May 2015.

== Track listing ==
Unless otherwise noted, Information is based on Liner Notes

No.	Title	Writer(s)	Producer	Length
1.	"Intro"	Nicholas Carter; Ted Chung	Ted "Wild Animals" Chung	1:47
2.	"I'm Innocent"	N. Carter; Patrick Douthit; General Johnson; Greg Perry; Angelo Bond	9th Wonder	3:52
3.	"Lookin' Fly"	N. Carter; William Adams; Keith Harris; Billy May	Keith Harris; will.i.am	3:59
4.	"The Science"	N. Carter; Elijah Molina	Scoop DeVille; DJ Quik (add.)	4:55
5.	"Can It Be (Half a Million Dollars and 18 Months Later)"	N. Carter; E. Molina; Arthur Ross; Leon Ware	Scoop DeVille	3:43
6.	"Everything"	N. Carter; Todd Moore; James Blunt; Eg White	LT Moe	3:34
7.	"Road Is My Religion"	N. Carter; Acklins "Mr. Khaliyl" Dillon	Mr. Khaliyl	4:13
8.	"Sooo Comfortable"	N. Carter; Jerry Long Jr.; Josef Leimberg	Josef Leimberg	5:02
9.	"Time Is Now" (featuring Snoop Dogg)	N. Carter; Calvin Broadus; Charles "Uncle Chucc" Hamilton; Terrace Martin	Terrace Martin	4:55
10.	"Think You Know Me"	N. Carter; Dominick Lamb; Freddie Gorman; Vernon Ricks; Henry Dixon; Walter Gaines	Nottz	4:00
11.	"Me and This Jawn"	N. Carter; D. Lamb; Ernie Isley; Marvin Isley; Chris Jasper; O'Kelly Isley Jr.; Ronald Isley; Rudolph Isley	Nottz	3:34
12.	"Love and Appreciate II" (featuring Tyler Woods)	N. Carter; P. Douthit; Tyler Woods; Freda Payne	9th Wonder	4:31
13.	"A Part of Me"	N. Carter; T. Martin; Terrence Smith; M. Williams; R. Miller	Terrace Martin	4:22
14.	"Break Up (The OJ Song)"	N. Carter; Cory Marks; Anthony Hamilton; Mark Batson	Knotch	4:08
15.	"Breakthrough"	N. Carter; P. Douthit; Barry Mann; Cynthia Weil	9th Wonder	4:05

Sample Credits

- ”I'm Innocent” samples “Innocent ‘Til Proven Guilty” (performed) by Honey Cone.
- ”Lookin' Fly” samples “The Green Hornet Theme” by Al Hirt.
- ”Can It Be” samples “I Wanna Be Where You Are” by Michael Jackson
- ”Everything” samples “I’ll Take Everything” by James Blunt.
- ”Think You Know Me” samples “Moment of Truth” by The Originals.
- ”Me and This Jawn” samples “For the Love of You” by The Isley Brothers.
- ”Love and Appreciate II” samples “Now It’s Time to Say Goodbye” by Freda Payne.
- ”Break Up (The OJ Song)” samples “Charlene” by Anthony Hamilton.
- ”Breakthrough” samples “Just Once” by The Main Ingredient.

Note

While the “I Wanna Be” Sample is credited to The Jackson 5 in the Liner Notes, the sampled song was actually performed by Michael Jackson.

== Personnel ==
Information is based on the Album's Liner notes

- Murs - Rap Vocals (1–9, 11–15, Lead on 10), Executive Producer
- 9th Wonder - Recording Engineer (12)
- Christopher Avery - Recording Engineer (7–8, 10–11)
- Calvin Bailiff - Recording Engineer (2, 15)
- Ted "Wild Animals" Chung - Audio Mixing (1), Executive Producer
- Aaron Dahl - Audio Mixing (2, 4–5, 8, 10–12, 14–15), Assistant Engineer (7)
- DJ Quik - DJ Scratches (4), Audio Mixing (2, 4–5, 7–15)
- Dylan Dresdow - Audio Mixing (3)
- Carlitta Durand - Additional Vocals (15)
- Kosta Elchev - Recording Engineer (4–6)
- Evan Eneman - Additional Vocals (1)
- Latonya "Tone Trezure" Givens - Background Vocals (10)
- Chucc Hamilton - Additional Keyboards (9)
- Chris Jackson - Recording Engineer (9)
- Justin Keitt - Keyboards (1)
- Khizman - Additional Lead Vocals (10)
- Kokane - Additional Vocals (8)
- Shvona Lavette - Additional Vocals (1)
- Robert "Bubby" Lewis - Bass played by (4)
- Victor Manzano - Recording Engineer (1, 14)
- Terrace Martin - Recording Engineer (9, 13)
- Steven Mudd - Assistant Engineer (3)
- Sebastian Nova - Assistant Engineer (3)
- Russell "Double R" Rededux - Executive Producer
- Sukari Reid-Glenn - Flute (4)
- Terrence "Scar" Smith - Additional Vocals (13)
- LaToiya Williams - Additional Vocals (9)

== Charts ==
Chart (2008)	Peak position
Canadian R&B Albums Chart	39
U.S. Billboard Comprehensive Albums	46
US Billboard 200	45
US Top Rap Albums (Billboard)	11
US Top R&B/Hip-Hop Albums (Billboard)	20
US Indie Store Album Sales (Billboard)	9

== Music videos ==
- Better Than the Best
- Lookin' Fly
- Can It Be (Half a Million Dollars and 18 Months Later)
- Me and This Jawn
- A Part of Me
- Break Up (The OJ Song)
- The Science
- Road Is My Religion

== MURS Administration ==
MURS Administration is a mockumentary movie about MURS running for the President of Hip-Hop. In the movie he is opposed for the presidency by Swaggerty and Eniggama. The film runs for 27:00, and contains strong language and nudity.
