= Harvest for the World (song) =

- European cover of the single

Single by The Isley Brothers

from the album Harvest for the World
- Released: 1976
- Recorded: 1975
- Genre: Funk, soul
- Length: 3:51
- Label: T-Neck
- Songwriters: Ernie Isley, Marvin Isley, Chris Jasper, Rudolph Isley, O'Kelly Isley, Ronald Isley
- Producers: The Isley Brothers, Chris Jasper

The Isley Brothers singles chronology
"Who Loves You Better (Part 1)" (1976)	"Harvest for the World" (1976)	"The Pride (Part 1)" (1977)

"Harvest for the World" is a song recorded by American musical group the Isley Brothers, released in 1976 as a single on their T-Neck imprint. It is the title track from their 1976 album Harvest for the World.

== Background and composition ==
One of their socially conscious singles (about world peace), the song was composed by Ernie Isley, who wrote most of the lyrics, together with Marvin Isley and Chris Jasper, with additional lyrics and musical arrangements added by the three original members O'Kelly, Rudolph and Ronald. The song was recorded on the same day as "Fight the Power (Part 1 & 2)", and was originally intended to be the lead single from the album The Heat Is On; but "Fight The Power" ended up being the lead single from that album, by a group vote. "Harvest for the World" was saved to go onto the album of the same title. As on many Isley Brothers records, Ronald sang lead on the song while his elder brothers O'Kelly and Rudolph backed him up.

== Chart performance ==
The song became a top ten R&B hit, peaking at No. 9 on that chart, and peaked at No. 63 on the Billboard Hot 100. It was a bigger hit in the UK, reaching No. 10 on the UK Singles Chart.

== Cover versions ==
British/American supergroup the Power Station recorded a cover of the song for their 1985 self-titled debut album.

The Christians released a 1988 hit cover of the song that reached No. 8 in the UK, with all proceeds going to charity.

Paul Carrack released a 2001 cover of the song on his album Groovin'.

Vanessa Williams covered the song for her 2005 album Everlasting Love.

== Personnel ==
- Ronald Isley: lead vocals, background vocals
- O'Kelly Isley Jr.: background vocals
- Rudolph Isley: background vocals
- Ernie Isley: electric guitar, acoustic guitars, drums, background vocals
- Marvin Isley: bass guitar, background vocals
- Chris Jasper: piano, keyboards, synthesizers, background vocals
- Handclaps by The Isley Brothers
- Produced, written, arranged and composed by The Isley Brothers and Chris Jasper
