= Go All the Way (Isley Brothers album) =

Studio album by the Isley Brothers
- Released: April 19, 1980
- Recorded: 1980
- Studio: Bearsville (Woodstock, New York)
- Genre: Funk; soul; rock; R&B
- Length: 35:35
- Label: T-Neck Records
- Producer: The Isley Brothers

The Isley Brothers chronology
Winner Takes All (1979)	Go All the Way (1980)	Grand Slam (1981)

Go All the Way is an album by the Isley Brothers, released on their T-Neck imprint on April 19, 1980.

The album was remastered and expanded for inclusion in the 2015 released CD box set The RCA Victor & T-Neck Album Masters, 1959-1983.

== Reception ==
Professional ratings
Review scores
Source	Rating
AllMusic	3/5 stars
Christgau's Record Guide	C+
Smash Hits	5/10

The album contains the Billboard number-one R&B ballad, "Don't Say Goodnight (It's Time For Love)", and the number 11 mid-tempo hit "Here We Go Again".

== Track listing ==
All tracks are written by Ernie Isley, Marvin Isley, Chris Jasper, Rudolph Isley, O'Kelly Isley and Ronald Isley.

Side one
No.	Title	Length
1.	"Go All the Way (Parts 1 & 2)"	5:01
2.	"Say You Will (Parts 1 & 2)"	5:25
3.	"Pass It On (Parts 1 & 2)"	5:38

Side two
No.	Title	Length
4.	"Here We Go Again (Parts 1 & 2)"	7:34
5.	"Don't Say Goodnight (It's Time for Love) (Parts 1 & 2)"	5:45
6.	"The Belly Dancer (Parts 1 & 2)"	6:12

== Personnel ==
- Ronald Isley - musical arrangement, lead vocals, background vocals
- O'Kelly Isley Jr. - musical arrangement, background vocals
- Rudolph Isley - musical arrangement, background vocals
- Ernie Isley - background vocals (5), musical arrangement, guitar, drums, timbales, congas, other percussion
- Marvin Isley - background vocals (5), musical arrangement, bass guitar, percussion
- Chris Jasper - background vocals (5), piano (5), string synthesizer (5), musical arrangement, keyboards, synthesizers, drums, timbales, congas, other percussion

== Charts ==
=== Weekly charts ===
Chart (1980)	Peak position
US Billboard 200	8
US Top R&B/Hip-Hop Albums (Billboard)	1

=== Year-end charts ===
Chart (1980)	Position
US Billboard 200	89
US Top R&B/Hip-Hop Albums (Billboard)	4

=== Singles ===
Year	Single	Chart positions	
Year	Single	US Pop	US Soul
1980	"Don't Say Goodnight (It's Time for Love)"	39	1
1980	"Here We Go Again"	-	11

== Certifications ==
Region	Certification	Certified units/sales
United States (RIAA)	Platinum	1,000,000^{^}
^{^} Shipments figures based on certification alone.

== See also ==
- List of number-one R&B albums of 1980 (U.S.)
