= Showdown (Isley Brothers album) =

Studio album by the Isley Brothers
- Released: April 22, 1978
- Recorded: 1978
- Studio: Bearsville (Woodstock, New York)
- Genre: Funk; rock
- Length: 41:50
- Label: T-Neck Records
- Producer: The Isley Brothers

The Isley Brothers chronology
Go for Your Guns (1977)	Showdown (1978)	Timeless (1978)

Showdown is the sixteenth studio album by the Isley Brothers, released on April 22, 1978, on their T-Neck Records label. Singles released from the album include the #1 funk/disco hit, "Take Me to the Next Phase" and the top 20 R&B slower, "Groove With You". The album became another platinum album for the Isley Brothers. It was remastered and expanded for inclusion in the 2015 released CD box set The RCA Victor & T-Neck Album Masters, 1959-1983.

== Release ==
Showdown was released 22 April 1978 on the Isley Brother's own T-Neck Records label. It was their sixteenth album release.

It was remastered and expanded for inclusion in the 2015 released CD box set The RCA Victor & T-Neck Album Masters, 1959-1983.

== Reception ==
Professional ratings
Review scores
Source	Rating
AllMusic	4/5 stars
Christgau's Record Guide	B

Spawning the #1 funk/disco hit, Take Me to the Next Phase (Part 1 & 2) and the top 20 R&B slower, "Groove With You", the album became another platinum album for the Isley Brothers.

== Track listing ==
Unless otherwise noted, Information is based on Liner notes

All tracks are written by Ernie Isley, Marvin Isley, Chris Jasper, Rudolph Isley, O'Kelly Isley and Ronald Isley.

Side one
No.	Title	Length
1.	"Showdown (Part 1 & 2)"	5:25
2.	"Groove with You"	4:52
3.	"Ain't Givin' Up No Love"	4:42
4.	"Rockin' with Fire (Part 1 & 2)"	5:57

Side two
No.	Title	Length
5.	"Take Me to the Next Phase (Part 1 & 2)"	5:10
6.	"Coolin' Me Out (Part 1 & 2)"	6:03
7.	"Fun and Games"	4:41
8.	"Love Fever (Part 1 & 2)"	5:00

Note

- While ”Take Me to the Next Phase” sounds like a live stadium recording, it is actually a studio recording with audience overdubs. Additional crowd noises are provided by Ernie Isley, Marvin Isley and Chris Jasper.

== Personnel ==
- Ronald Isley - lead vocals, background vocals
- O'Kelly Isley, Jr. - background vocals
- Rudolph Isley - background vocals
- Chris Jasper - percussion (5), foot stomps (5), piano, keyboards, ARP synthesizers, clavinet, tambourine, background vocals
- Marvin Isley - foot stomps (5), bass, woodblock, cowbell, percussion, background vocals
- Ernie Isley - congas, percussion (1, 3, 5, 7), foot stomps (5), guitar, drums, timbales, maracas, background vocals

Technical

- John Holbrook - recording engineer
- Thomas Mark - recording engineer

== Charts ==
=== Weekly charts ===
Chart (1978)	Peak position
US Billboard 200	4
US Top R&B/Hip-Hop Albums (Billboard)	1

=== Year-end charts ===
Chart (1978)	Position
US Billboard 200	82
US Top R&B/Hip-Hop Albums (Billboard)	9

== Certifications ==
Region	Certification	Certified units/sales
United States (RIAA)	Platinum	1,000,000^{^}
^{^} Shipments figures based on certification alone.

== See also ==
- List of number-one R&B albums of 1978 (U.S.)
