= Fight the Power (Part 1 & 2) =

Single by the Isley Brothers

from the album The Heat Is On
- Released: May 31, 1975
- Recorded: Kendun Recorders, Los Angeles, California
- Genre: Rock; funk
- Length: 5:18
- Label: T-Neck; 2256
- Songwriters: Rudolph Isley; O'Kelly Isley, Jr.; Ronald Isley; Ernie Isley; Marvin Isley; Chris Jasper
- Producer: The Isley Brothers

The Isley Brothers singles chronology
"Midnight Sky (Part 1)" (1974)	"Fight the Power" (1975)	"For the Love of You" (1975)

Official audio
- "Fight the Power, Pts. 1 & 2" on YouTube

"Fight the Power" (sometimes titled as "Fight the Power (Part 1 and Part 2)") is a song recorded by the Isley Brothers; the band released the song as the first single off their landmark album, The Heat Is On. The song is notable for the usage of the word "bullshit", which was censored during radio airplay.

== History ==
=== Recording ===
The song was sparked in a 1975 recording session in which guitarist Ernie Isley, inspired by the news, wrote two songs: "Fight the Power" and an anti-poverty ballad titled "Harvest for the World". The group ended up recording both songs on the same day and eventually picked "Fight the Power" as the song to release first. "Harvest" would be featured on the album of the same name and would be released as the first single off that album.

The song was written almost fully by Ernie Isley with additional instrumental background composition by the band's keyboardist Chris Jasper. After playing the track on his guitar to his older brother Ronnie, he recorded a multi-track lead vocal, arranged by Jasper and Ernie. Ernie later said he was taken aback that Ron had uttered "bullshit". When asked why he used the word, Ron simply replied, "because it needed to be said" and "it's what people want to hear."

The song reflected a negative opinion of authority figures, a feeling shared by all the band members; this can explain Ron Isley's intensified vocalizing. As was with the majority of their recordings during the so-called 3+3 era, Ernie Isley and Chris Jasper had to share composition and lyrical credit with the other Isley members.

=== Release ===
The song was released in May 1975. It became one of the group's most popular recordings, reaching number 1 on the R&B singles chart and crossed over to the pop charts reaching number 4 on the Billboard Hot 100. Due to its strong dance flavor, the song was played heavily at dance clubs; this exposure the song to land at number 13 on Billboard's dance chart. "Fight the Power" gave the brothers their first song to peak in the top 20 on three different charts.

The success of the song also helped its album, The Heat Is On, reach number 1 on the pop chart. The song's lyric, "we gotta fight the powers that be", would be interpolated years later by rap group Public Enemy on their 1989 song of the same name. The intense politically conscious style of the song would be repeated in other intense recordings including "Livin' in the Life", "Climbin' Up The Ladder" and "The Pride".

== Legacy ==
In June 2026, CBS News included the song in its list of the 250 essential American songs of the past 250 years.

== Chart history ==
=== Weekly charts ===
Chart (1975)	Peak position
Canada RPM Top Singles	31
U.S. Billboard Hot 100	4
U.S. Billboard R&B	1
U.S. Billboard Dance/Disco	13
U.S. Cash Box Top 100	6

=== Year-end charts ===
Chart (1975)	Rank
U.S. Billboard Hot 100	29
U.S. Cash Box	77

== Uses in popular culture ==
- The song was used in a 2015 TV commercial for Nespresso featuring George Clooney and Danny DeVito.
- It was also used in the 1998 film Out of Sight, which stars Clooney and is coproduced by DeVito.
- The song was used in the opening credits of the 2013 movie The Heat starring Sandra Bullock and Melissa McCarthy.

== Personnel ==
Unless otherwise indicated, Information based on Original album Liner notes

- Ronald Isley: lead vocals, background vocals
- Rudolph Isley: background vocals
- O'Kelly Isley, Jr.: background vocals
- Ernie Isley: congas, electric guitar, drums
- Marvin Isley: bass guitar
- Chris Jasper: tambourine, clavinet keyboard, electric piano, ARP synthesizer
