= Grand Slam (Isley Brothers album) =

Studio album by the Isley Brothers
- Released: March 21, 1981
- Recorded: 1981
- Studio: Bearsville (Woodstock, New York)
- Genre: Funk, soul
- Length: 32:05
- Label: T-Neck Records/CBS
- Producer: The Isley Brothers

The Isley Brothers chronology
Go All the Way (1980)	Grand Slam (1981)	Inside You (1981)

Grand Slam is the nineteenth album by the Isley Brothers, released on their T-Neck imprint via CBS Records on March 21, 1981. The album was recorded and mixed digitally.

The album was remastered and expanded for inclusion in the 2015 CD box set The RCA Victor & T-Neck Album Masters, 1959-1983.

== Reception ==
Professional ratings
Review scores
Source	Rating
AllMusic	2.5/5 stars

Grand Slam was successful on both the pop and R&B album charts, where it reached #28 and #3, respectively. It eventually went gold after selling 500,000 copies.

== Track listing ==
All tracks are written by Ernie Isley, Marvin Isley, O'Kelly Isley, Ronald Isley, Rudolph Isley and Chris Jasper.

Side one
No.	Title	Length
1.	"Tonight Is the Night (If I Had You)"	4:57
2.	"I Once Had Your Love (and I Can't Let Go)"	4:41
3.	"Hurry Up and Wait"	3:54
Total length:		13:32

Side two
No.	Title	Length
4.	"Young Girls"	5:00
5.	"Party Night"	4:09
6.	"Don't Let Up"	5:06
7.	"Who Said?"	4:18
Total length:		18:33

== Personnel ==
The Isley Brothers

- Ronald Isley — lead vocals, background vocals, musical arrangement
- O'Kelly Isley — background vocals, musical arrangement
- Rudolph Isley — background vocals, musical arrangement
- Ernie Isley — background vocals (2), musical arrangement, guitars, drums, percussion
- Marvin Isley — background vocals (2), musical arrangement, bass guitar, percussion
- Chris Jasper — background vocals (2), musical arrangement, keyboards, congas, other percussion

Guest Musicians

- Eve Otto — harp (1)
- Kevin Jones — congas (1–2, 4–5, 7)
- Everett Collins — drums (1, 7)

== Charts ==
=== Weekly charts ===
Chart (1981)	Peak position
US Billboard 200	28
US Top R&B/Hip-Hop Albums (Billboard)	3

=== Year-end charts ===
Chart (1981)	Position
US Top Soul Albums (Billboard)	27

=== Singles ===
Year	Single	Chart positions	
Year	Single	US Pop	US Soul
1981	"Who Said?"	-	20
1981	"Hurry Up And Wait"	58	17
1981	"I Once Had Your Love (And I Can't Let Go)"	-	57

== Certifications ==
Region	Certification	Certified units/sales
United States (RIAA)	Gold	500,000^{^}
^{^} Shipments figures based on certification alone.
