= Harvest for the World =

Harvest For The World

Studio album by The Isley Brothers
- Released: May 29, 1976
- Recorded: 1975–1976
- Studio: Record Plant (Los Angeles, California)
- Genre: Progressive soul; soft rock; R&B
- Length: 37:54
- Label: T-Neck
- Producer: The Isley Brothers

The Isley Brothers chronology
The Heat Is On (1975)	Harvest For The World (1976)	Go for Your Guns (1977)

Harvest for the World is the fourteenth studio album released by The Isley Brothers on their T-Neck imprint on May 29, 1976.

The album was remastered and expanded for inclusion in the 2015 released CD box set The RCA Victor & T-Neck Album Masters, 1959–1983.

== Reception ==
Professional ratings
Review scores
Source	Rating
AllMusic	4/5 stars
Christgau's Record Guide	B−
Pitchfork	9.0/10

The album included the successful socially conscious title track and the top three R&B record, "Who Loves You Better?" While not released as singles, the ballads "(At Your Best) You Are Love" and "Let Me Down Easy" were also hits. The album sold over 500,000 copies in the first three weeks of release, making it one of the fastest-selling records ever (it passed the million sales mark in the early 2000s). It topped the Billboard R&B Albums chart; the Isleys third straight album to do so.

== Track listing ==
Unless otherwise noted, information is based on liner notes

All tracks are written by Ernie Isley, Marvin Isley, Chris Jasper, Rudolph Isley, O'Kelly Isley and Ronald Isley.

Side One
No.	Title	Length
1.	"Harvest for the World (Prelude)"	2:11
2.	"Harvest for the World"	3:51
3.	"People of Today"	4:42
4.	"Who Loves You Better"	5:31

Side Two
No.	Title	Length
5.	"(At Your Best) You Are Love"	5:23
6.	"Let Me Down Easy"	6:30
7.	"So You Wanna Stay Down"	3:51
8.	"You Still Feel the Need"	4:50

2001 reissue bonus track
No.	Title	Writer(s)	Length
9.	"Summer Breeze" (Live at Bearsville Studios)	Jim Seals, Dash Crofts	8:43

== Personnel ==
Performance

- Ronald Isley – lead vocals
- O'Kelly Isley Jr. background vocals, lead vocals (6)
- Rudolph Isley background vocals, lead vocals (8)
- Ernie Isley – congas, other percussion (2, 5), timbales, maracas, electric guitar, six-string acoustic guitar, 12-string acoustic guitar, drums, background vocals
- Marvin Isley – bass, cowbell, percussion, background vocals
- Chris Jasper – tambourine, other percussion (2, 5), acoustic piano, electric piano, ARP synthesizer, clavinet, background vocals

Production

- The Isley Brothers – producers
- Malcolm Cecil – recording engineer (1–8), producer, music programming
- John Holbrook – live recording engineer (9)

== Later samples and covers ==
Later Samples

- Paul Johnson sampled "Harvest for the World" for his song “4 the World”, from the 1995 album Bump Talkin’
- Mo Kolours also sampled "Harvest for the World" for his song “Harvest”, which first appeared on the 2015 album Texture Like Sun
- Tracey Lee sampled "Let Me Down Easy" on his song “On the Edge”, from the 1997 album Many Facez
- Devin the Dude also reused "Let Me Down Easy" on the song “I Can’t Handle It”, from his 2010 album Suite 420
- Sevyn Streeter sampled the song on the track "Before I Do" from her 2017 debut album Girl Disrupted.

Cover Versions

- Power Station covered "Harvest for the World" on their album The Power Station in 1985.
- The Christians covered "Harvest for the World" in 1988. The song reached #8 in the UK Singles chart
- Ronnie Laws first recorded the song "Harvest for the World" with the Isley Brothers themselves for his 1992 album Deep Soul, then later covered the entire album of "Harvest for the World" titled Portrait of the Isley Brothers' Harvest for the World in 1998.
- Aaliyah covered "(At Your Best) You Are Love" on her album Age Ain't Nothing but a Number in 1994.
- Jewell covered "Harvest for the World" on the soundtrack album Murder Was the Case in 1994.
- Christine Collister covered "Harvest for the World" on her album Blue Aconite in 1996.
- Mike Francis covered "Harvest for the World" in both English and Italian. The Italian version, known as "Il Mio Amore Libero per Te", first appeared on his 1998 album Misteria.
- Paul Carrack open his album Groovin' with this song, in 2001.
- Vanessa Williams covered "Harvest for the World" on her album Everlasting Love in 2005.

== Charts ==
Chart (1976)	Peak position
Billboard Pop Albums	9
Billboard Top Soul Albums	1

=== Singles ===
Year	Single	Chart positions		
Year	Single	US Pop	US R&B	US Dance
1976	"Who Loves You Better"	47	3	2
1976	"Harvest for the World"	63	9	–
1976	"People of Today"	–	–	3

== Certifications and sales ==
Region	Certification	Certified units/sales
United States (RIAA)	Platinum	1,000,000^{^}
^{^} Shipments figures based on certification alone.

== See also ==
- List of number-one R&B albums of 1976 (U.S.)
