= Go for Your Guns =

Studio album by the Isley Brothers
- Released: April 16, 1977
- Recorded: 1976–77
- Studio: Bearsville (Woodstock, New York)
- Genre: Funk; rock
- Length: 33:25
- Label: T-Neck Records
- Producer: The Isley Brothers

The Isley Brothers chronology
Harvest for the World (1976)	Go for Your Guns (1977)	Showdown (1978)

Go for Your Guns is the fifteenth album by the Isley Brothers. Released on April 16, 1977, on their T-Neck label, it was also the band's fifth album to be distributed by their deal with Epic. Released in mid-April 1977, the album peaked a month later at No. 1 on Billboard's Top Soul chart, and at No. 6 on the Billboard 200.

The album was remastered and expanded for inclusion in the 2015 released CD box set The RCA Victor & T-Neck Album Masters, 1959–1983.

== Overview ==
=== Recording ===
After four albums that were assisted by producers Malcolm Cecil and Robert Margouleff in California, the Isley Brothers decided to stay in the East Coast choosing to record at upstate New York's Bearsville Studios, not too far from the brothers' T-Neck label in neighboring New Jersey at Chris Jasper's insistence. The album was engineered by John Holbrook assisted by Tom Mark. It was mixed at Mediasound in New York City with Holbrook as mix engineer.

The album also noted Ron Isley's growing transition into singing more ballads, though he still performed lead on some of the band's funkier recordings on the album. Though they had changed their location and had some minor changes during production, most of the direction of the album remained the same as it had for other albums, with stronger emphasis on rock music as evident in the songs "Climbing Up the Ladder" and "Livin' in the Life" than they had on previous albums.

=== Reception ===
Professional ratings
Review scores
Source	Rating
AllMusic	4/5 stars
Christgau's Record Guide	B
Pitchfork	8.7/10
The Rolling Stone Album Guide	3/5 stars

Released in 1977, the album became one of their longest-running chart successes on the album chart staying on the charts for 40 weeks and spawning several singles including "The Pride", "Livin' in the Life" and the ballad "Voyage to Atlantis", while the funk ballad "Footsteps in the Dark", although never released as a single, became one of the brothers' most popular songs in their repertoire and would be sampled constantly, most famously by rapper Ice Cube in his hit, "It Was a Good Day". The album was certified platinum in July 1977, then eventually went double platinum by the Recording Industry Association of America (RIAA), with shipments of two million copies.

== Track listing ==
Unless otherwise indicated, information is taken from Allmusic.com and is based on Liner notes

All tracks are written by Rudolph Isley, O'Kelly Isley, Ronald Isley, Ernie Isley, Marvin Isley and Chris Jasper.

Side one
No.	Title	Length
1.	"The Pride (Part 1 & 2)"	5:33
2.	"Footsteps in the Dark (Part 1 & 2)"	5:07
3.	"Tell Me When You Need It Again (Part 1 & 2)"	5:06

Side two
No.	Title	Length
4.	"Climbin' Up the Ladder (Part 1 & 2)"	6:39
5.	"Voyage to Atlantis"	4:32
6.	"Livin' in the Life"	4:15
7.	"Go for Your Guns"	2:16

2011 reissue bonus tracks
No.	Title	Length
8.	"Voyage to Atlantis" (Alternate Version)	6:33
9.	"The Pride (Part 1)" (Single Version)	3:25
10.	"Voyage to Atlantis" (Single Version)	3:53

2016 reissue bonus tracks
No.	Title	Length
8.	"The Pride (Disco Mix)" (Bonus Track)	5:29
9.	"Voyage to Atlantis (Mono Single Version)" (Bonus Track)	3:54
10.	"Livin' in the Life/Go for Your Guns (Disco Version)" (Bonus Track)	6:29

== Personnel ==
The Isley Brothers

- Ronald Isley - lead vocals, background vocals
- Rudolph Isley - background vocals
- O'Kelly Isley - background vocals
- Ernie Isley - background vocals (2, 5), congas (2, 5), 12-String guitar (2, 5), electric guitar (1–2, 5), rhythm guitar, drums
- Marvin Isley - background vocals (2, 5), bass
- Chris Jasper - background vocals (2, 5), tambourine (2, 5), piano (2, 5), synthesizer (2, 5), keyboards

Guest Musician

- Everett Collins - congas (3)

== Charts ==
Chart (1977)	Peak position
Billboard Pop Albums	6
Billboard Top Soul Albums	1

== Certifications ==
Region	Certification	Certified units/sales
United States (RIAA)	2× Platinum	2,000,000^{^}
^{^} Shipments figures based on certification alone.

== See also ==
- List of number-one R&B albums of 1977 (U.S.)
