= Everlasting Love (Vanessa Williams album) =

Studio album by Vanessa Williams
- Released: January 25, 2005
- Recorded: 2004–2005
- Studios: Sound On Sound (New York City, New York); Porcupine Studios (Phoenix, Arizona); Abbey Road Studios (London, UK)
- Genre: R&B
- Length: 58:20
- Label: Lava
- Producer: Rob Mathes

Vanessa Williams chronology
Silver & Gold (2004)	Everlasting Love (2005)	The Real Thing (2009)

Singles from Everlasting Love
- 1. "You Are Everything" Released: November 9, 2004; 2. "Never Can Say Goodbye" Released: December 21, 2004; 3. "Show and Tell" Released: March 29, 2005; 4. "Everlasting Love" Released: April 18, 2005; 5. "I'll Be Good to You" Released: July 12, 2005

Professional ratings
Review scores
Source	Rating
AllMusic	3/5 stars

Everlasting Love is the seventh studio album (eighth overall) by Vanessa Williams, released in the United States on January 25, 2005 by Lava Records. Produced entirely by Rob Mathes, the album contains cover versions of 1970s soul love songs except for the final track, which is an original song. Covers include notably "You Are Everything" released as a single and also "Show and Tell" and the title track "Everlasting Love".

The album received rave reviews and has sold 60,000 copies to date. The album peaked at number one hundred and fifty-nine on the Billboard 200 and number fifty-seven on the Top R&B/Hip-Hop Albums. The single "You Are Everything" became another hit for Williams, reaching number sixteen on the Hot Adult Contemporary Tracks, number five on the Hot Dance Club Play, and number four on the Hot Dance Singles Sales. It also became a major club hit that summer due to disco club mixes of the song by Junior Vasquez.

== Track listing ==
No.	Title	Writer(s)	Originally Recorded by	Length
1.	"Tuning"			0:18
2.	"Never Can Say Goodbye" (Featuring George Benson)	Clifton Davis	The Jackson 5	5:03
3.	"Midnight Blue"	Melissa Manchester, Carole Bayer Sager	Melissa Manchester	3:47
4.	"Show and Tell"	Jerry Fuller	Johnny Mathis	4:11
5.	"Let's Love"	Willie Beck, James Williams, Marshall Jones, Marvin Pierce, Ralph Middlebrooks, Clarence Satchell, Leroy Bonner	The Ohio Players	4:56
6.	"First Time Ever I Saw Your Face"	Ewan MacColl	Ewan MacColl	5:42
7.	"Everlasting Love"	David Wolinski, Dennis Belfield, Kevin Murphy	Rufus & Chaka Khan	4:28
8.	"With You I'm Born Again" (Duet with George Benson)	David Shire, Carol Connors	Billy Preston & Syreeta Wright	3:53
9.	"Send One Your Love"	Stevie Wonder	Stevie Wonder	3:41
10.	"You Are Everything"	Thom Bell, Linda Creed	The Stylistics	3:45
11.	"One Less Bell to Answer"	Burt Bacharach, Hal David	The 5th Dimension	4:06
12.	"I'll Be Good to You" (Duet with James "D-Train" Williams)	George Johnson, Louis Johnson, Sonora Sam	The Brothers Johnson	4:29
13.	"Harvest for the World"	Ronald Isley, Rudolph Isley, Marvin Isley, O'Kelly Isley, Jr., Ernest Isley, Christopher Jasper	The Isley Brothers	5:12
14.	"Today and Everyday (Wedding Song)"	Rob Mathes		4:49

== Personnel ==
- Vanessa Williams – vocals (2–14)
- Rob Mathes – acoustic piano (2–8, 11, 13), electric piano (2, 5, 7), clavinet (2, 5, 7, 13), Hammond B3 organ (2, 5–7, 13), Fender Rhodes (3, 6, 9, 11), electric guitar pad (3), 6-string guitar (3), 12-string guitar (3, 11), Wurlitzer electric piano (4, 13), electric guitar (4, 13), acoustic guitar (6, 11, 13), mallet (6), gut-string acoustic guitar (8–10, 14), keyboards (10, 12, 14), synth bass (10, 13), programming (14), backing vocals (14)
- Andy Snitzer – programming (2, 7, 10, 12), tenor saxophone (2, 5, 7, 12, 13)
- Jan Folkson – programming (14)
- George Benson – guitar solo (2), vocals (8)
- Keith Robinson – guitars (2, 5, 8, 10, 12)
- Al Caldwell – bass (2, 5, 7, 8, 10, 12)
- Will Lee – bass (3, 6, 11, 13)
- James Genus – electric bass (4), bass (8), acoustic bass (9)
- J.T. Lewis – drums (2, 5, 7, 8, 10, 12)
- Shawn Pelton – drums (3, 6, 11, 13), human beatbox (6), loops (13)
- Poogie Bell – drums (4, 9)
- Bashiri Johnson – percussion (2, 4, 5, 8, 9, 11, 13)
- David Mann – tenor saxophone (2, 5), alto flute (7), flute (7), alto flute solo (9), alto saxophone (12, 13)
- Aaron Heick – alto flute (7), flute (7), tenor saxophone (12)
- Michael Davis – tenor trombone (2, 5, 13), trombone (12)
- Jeff Kievit – trumpet (2, 5, 12, 13), flugelhorn (7)
- James D-Train Williams – backing vocals (2, 4), vocals (12)
- Lisa Fischer – backing vocals (4)
- Vaneese Thomas – backing vocals (4)

The London Session Orchestra

- Rob Mathes – arrangements, orchestration and conductor
- Isobel Griffiths – orchestra contractor
- Lori Casteel, Mike Casteel and T.D. Ellis IV – music copyists

Horns and Woodwinds

- Julie Andrews – bassoon (6, 8, 11)
- Andrew Findon – flute (6, 8, 11)
- Chris Cowie – oboe (6, 8, 11)
- Richard Berry, Nigel Black and Richard Watkins – French horn (6, 8, 11)

Strings

- Lynda Houghton and Chris Laurence – bass (6, 8, 11)
- David Daniels, John Heley and Martin Loveday – cello (2, 4, 6, 8, 9, 11, 14)
- Caroline Dearnley and Stephen Orton – cello (6, 8, 11)
- Skaila Kanga – harp (6, 8, 11)
- Gustav Clarkson, Peter Lale and Bruce White – viola (2, 4, 6, 8, 9, 11, 14)
- Rachel Bolt, Kate Musker and Katie Wilkinson – viola (6, 8, 11)
- Mark Berrow, Peter Hanson, Patrick Kiernan, Boguslaw Kostecki, Rita Manning, Everton Nelson, Emlyn Singleton, David Woodcock, Gavyn Wright and Warren Zielinski – violin (2, 4, 6, 8, 9, 11, 14)
- Dermot Crehan, Elizabeth Edwards, David Emanuel, Simon Fischer, Lorraine McAslan and Jim McLeod – violin (6, 8, 11)

== Production ==
- Michael Gruber – executive producer
- Matt Walden – executive producer
- Vanessa Williams – executive producer
- Rob Mathes – producer, arrangements
- Jan Folkson – recording, editing
- Phil Magnotti – recording
- Mark Mandelbaum – recording
- Simon Rhodes – orchestra recording (2, 4, 6, 8, 9, 11, 14)
- Jeff Harris – recording (George Benson)
- John Wroble – recording (George Benson)
- Ray Bardani – mixing at Sound On Sound (New York, NY)
- Isaiah Abolin – assistant engineer, mix assistant
- Katherine Diehl – assistant engineer
- Kris Lewis – assistant engineer
- Jennifer Zimmer – assistant engineer
- Andy Snitzer – editing
- Greg Calbi – mastering at Sterling Sound (New York, NY)
- Andy Shane – A&R
- Jill Dell'Abate – production assistant
- Angela McLain – product manager
- Christina Dittmar – art direction
- Benjamin Niles – design
- Rod Spicer – photography

== Charts ==
Chart performance for Everlasting Love
Chart (2005)	Peak position
US Billboard 200	159
US Top R&B/Hip-Hop Albums (Billboard)	57

== Release history ==
Release history for Everlasting Love
Region	Date	Label	Ref.
Japan	January 26, 2005	Warner Music Japan	
