= Footsteps in the Dark =

1977 song performed by The Isley Brothers

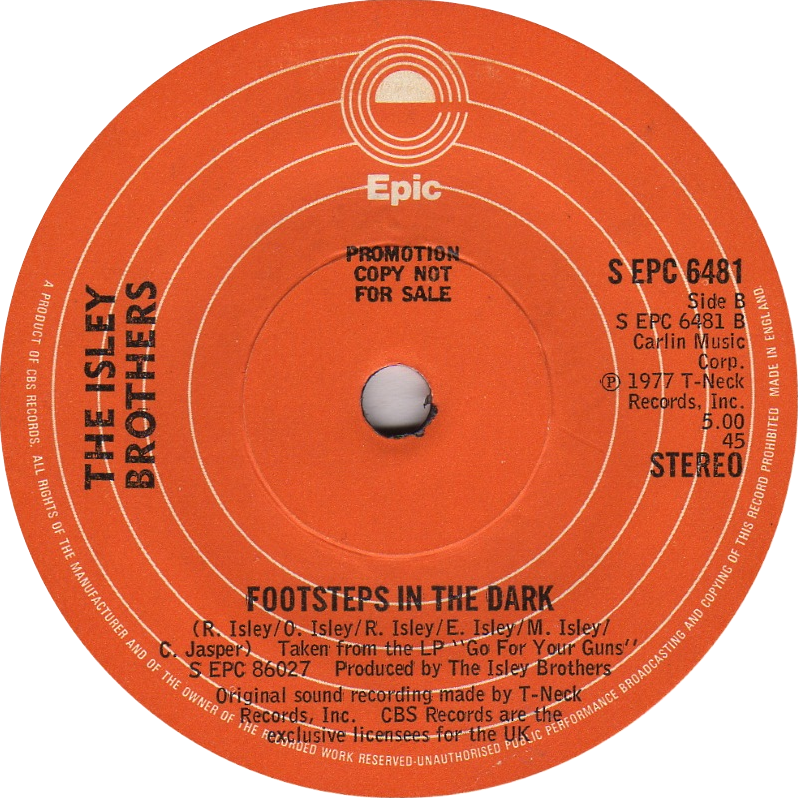

Song by The Isley Brothers

from the album Go for Your Guns
- A-side: "Groove with You"
- Released: 1977
- Recorded: Bearsville Studios, Bearsville, New York
- Genre: R&B; soul; funk
- Length: 5:07
- Label: T-Neck
- Songwriters: Ernie Isley; Marvin Isley; O'Kelly Isley; Ronald Isley; Rudolph Isley; Chris Jasper
- Producer: The Isley Brothers

"Footsteps in the Dark" is a 1977 slow jam song recorded by American group The Isley Brothers as an album track featured on the group's album Go for Your Guns. It was the B-side to "Groove with You", which reached number 16 on the R&B singles chart. The song is noted for its unique guitar timbre which can be heard on other Isley Brothers tracks such as "Voyage to Atlantis", as well as marking Ron Isley's growing transition into singing more ballads compared to the band's earlier funk approach.

Since the 1990s, it has been sampled in numerous other songs, predominantly in the R&B and hip hop genres. Most famously, it was used in "It Was a Good Day" by California-based rapper Ice Cube.

== Composition ==
Ernie Isley's playing on this track is heavily influenced by artists such as Jimi Hendrix, whose first recording session was actually with the Isley Brothers in 1964 with the track "Testify".

Ernie Isley not only played guitar but also played drums and wrote the lyrics to "Footsteps in the Dark". The verse of the song is written in the key of F# Minor.

== Credits and personnel ==
Written, composed and arranged by The Isley Brothers
Co-produced by The Isley Brothers, Malcolm Cecil and Robert Margouleff

- Ronald Isley – lead vocals, backing vocals
- Rudolph Isley – backing vocals
- O'Kelly Isley, Jr. – backing vocals
- Ernie Isley – backing vocals, congas, drums, guitars, 12-string guitar
- Marvin Isley – backing vocals, bass guitar
- Chris Jasper – backing vocals, tambourine, piano, synthesizer
