= Live It Up (Isley Brothers album) =

Studio album by the Isley Brothers
- Released: September 7, 1974
- Recorded: 1974
- Studio: The Record Plant, Los Angeles, California
- Genre: Funk; soul; rock
- Length: 38:29
- Label: T-Neck
- Producer: The Isley Brothers

The Isley Brothers chronology
3 + 3 (1973)	Live It Up (1974)	The Heat Is On (1975)

Singles from Live It Up
- 1. "Live it Up" Released: July 1974; 2. "Midnight Sky" Released: November 1974

Live It Up is the twelfth album by the Isley Brothers, released on September 7, 1974. It was their second major-distributed album with Epic Records under their T-Neck subsidiary.

The album was remastered and expanded for inclusion in the 2015 released CD box set The RCA Victor & T-Neck Album Masters, 1959–1983.

== Recording ==
Like their previous recording, their breakthrough 1973 album, 3 + 3, the album was assisted by the team of Malcolm Cecil and Robert Margouleff. The album also continued their growing trademark of funky dance songs mixed with softer soul ballads, which set the precedent for their landmark 1975 release, The Heat Is On.

== Reception ==
Professional ratings
Review scores
Source	Rating
AllMusic	4/5 stars
Christgau's Record Guide	B
Pitchfork	8.8/10
DownBeat	5/5 stars

The album spawned hit singles such as the title track, which topped at number eight on the US R&B charts, while another single, "Midnight Sky", was also a top ten R&B success, while both songs received some modest play on the pop and rock stations. The album's ballads including their slower rendition of Todd Rundgren's hit, "Hello It's Me", which was their only cover on the album, became popular alongside the folk rock influenced ballad, "Brown Eyed Girl" (not to be confused with Van Morrison's song of the same title).

The album track, "Need a Little Taste of Love", was later covered by The Doobie Brothers, while their version of "Hello It's Me" was covered by neo soul duo Groove Theory and was partially interpolated in Whitney Houston's single, "One of Those Days". Another track, "Ain't I Been Good to You", would be sampled by UGK on the track "One Day". Live It Up peaked at number 14 on the US pop albums chart and number-one on the R&B albums chart, making it their first number-one R&B album. It was certified platinum by the Recording Industry Association of America (RIAA), selling a million copies.

Marv Hohman of DownBeat praised the album and claimed that "the Isleys have delivered the finest effort in their career."

== Track listing ==
All tracks are written by Rudolph Isley, O'Kelly Isley, Ronald Isley, Ernie Isley, Marvin Isley and Chris Jasper, except where noted.

Side One
No.	Title	Length
1.	"Live It Up (Part 1 & 2)"	6:14
2.	"Brown Eyed Girl"	4:14
3.	"Need a Little Taste of Love"	3:03
4.	"Lover's Eve"	4:40

Side Two
No.	Title	Writer(s)	Length
5.	"Midnight Sky (Part 1 & 2)"		6:56
6.	"Hello It's Me"	Todd Rundgren	5:32
7.	"Ain't I Been Good to You (Part 1 & 2)"		8:29

2004 reissue bonus track
No.	Title	Length
8.	"Live It Up" (Live on the Dinah Shore Show, 1974)	3:29

== Personnel ==
- Ronald Isley – lead vocals
- O'Kelly Isley, Jr. – background vocals
- Rudolph Isley – background vocals
- Ernie Isley – electric guitar, acoustic guitar, drums, percussion
- Marvin Isley – bass guitar
- Chris Jasper – electric piano, clavinet, ARP synthesizers, T.O.N.T.O., piano
- George Moreland – drums
- Karl Potter – percussion
- Truman Thomas – organ

== Charts ==
Chart (1974)	Peak position
US Billboard Pop Albums	14
US Billboard Top Soul Albums	1

=== Singles ===
Year	Single	Chart positions	
Year	Single	US Pop	US R&B
1974	"Live It Up"	52	4
1974	"Midnight Sky"	73	8

== See also ==
- List of number-one R&B albums of 1974 (U.S.)
