= The Heat Is On (album) =

Studio album by the Isley Brothers
- Released: June 7, 1975
- Recorded: 1975
- Studios: Kendun Recorders, Burbank
- Genres: Soul; rock; funk
- Length: 37:03
- Labels: T-Neck, Epic
- Producer: The Isley Brothers

The Isley Brothers chronology
Live It Up (1974)	The Heat Is On (1975)	Harvest for the World (1976)

Singles from The Heat Is On
- 1. "Fight the Power (Part 1 & 2)" Released: May 31, 1975; 2. "For the Love of You (Part 1 & 2)" Released: October 20, 1975

The Heat Is On is the thirteenth studio album by American soul and funk group The Isley Brothers, released June 7, 1975, on T-Neck Records and Epic Records. Written and produced entirely by the group, the album was recorded in 1975 at Kendun Recorders in Burbank, California. The Heat Is On features musical elements of rock, and is divided between uptempo funk songs and soul ballads.

The Heat Is On sold 500,000 copies in its first month of release and spent 40 weeks on the U.S. Billboard Pop Albums chart. It became the Isley Brothers' first number-one album in the United States. The album received generally favorable reviews from publications, including The Village Voice, Melody Maker, and Rolling Stone. Music critics have since cited the album as among the Isley Brothers' best work. In 1999, The Heat Is On was certified double platinum by the Recording Industry Association of America (RIAA), with shipments of two million copies. It was reissued on compact disc in 2001 by Epic Records. The album was also remastered and expanded for inclusion in the 2015 released CD box set The RCA Victor & T-Neck Album Masters, 1959–1983.

== Background and recording ==
Recording sessions for the album took place in 1975 at Kendun Recorders in Burbank, California. It was mixed at Westlake Audio in Los Angeles, California and mastered by engineer Kent Duncan. The album was entirely written and produced by the Isley Brothers. The group utilized many acoustic and electric instruments during its recording, including guitar, piano, and the ARP synthesizer, which was programmed by engineers Malcolm Cecil and Robert Margouleff. The Heat Is On is the third album recorded by the Isley Brothers with keyboardist Chris Jasper, bassist Marvin Isley, and guitarist Ernie Isley.

== Composition ==
The Heat Is On is a soul/rock album of danceable funk songs contrasting with romantic quiet storm ballads. The rock stylings are mostly provided by the Jimi Hendrix–influenced guitar of Ernie Isley. The album is part of a succession of slickly produced, successful soul records issued by the Isley Brothers during the 1970s. This musical formula for the album serves as a development of the group's transitional sound last featured on their landmark tenth album, 3 + 3 (1973). The Heat is On is the third album of the group's "3+3" configuration, featuring a trio of traditional R&B vocalists backed by three funk/rock musicians.

The Heat Is On is notable for its two radio singles, the album's angry funk opener "Fight the Power (Part 1 & 2)" and the melodic soul ballad "For the Love of You (Part 1 & 2)". One critic cited the former song as the Isley Brothers' "most overtly political tune to date". According to writer Colin Larkin, the album's contrasting sides, with one comprising uptempo funk and the other comprising a suite of smooth soul, represent "the pinnacle of both genres". Side one's closer, "Hope You Feel Better Love (Part 1 & 2)", contrasts both of the styles, as it contains melodic verses and a forceful chorus and is blessed with another Ernie solo that underlines the sheer genius of his guitar work to a driving, mid-tempo groove.

== Critical reception ==
Professional ratings
Review scores
Source	Rating
AllMusic	4.5/5 stars
Christgau's Record Guide	B
Pitchfork Media	9.3/10
Virgin Encyclopedia of Popular Music	5/5 stars

The Heat Is On was received positively by critics. Rolling Stone's Bob Palmer wrote favorably of the Isley Brothers' dance music sensibilities and cited The Heat Is On as "some of the best body music around". Mark Anthony Neal of PopMatters applauded Ronald Isley's interpretive skills and balladry, stating "Whereas the up-tempo workouts helped the Isley's reach new audiences, it was their balladry, courtesy of lead vocalist Ronald, that distinguished them among other soul/R&B/funk bands of the era." Village Voice reviewer Robert Christgau described the music as a "well-nigh flawless" example of the Isley's style, although he found Ronald's vocal persona as "unctuous" as before. In 2001, the album was reissued on compact disc by Epic Records with a live bonus cut of "Fight the Power".

== Commercial performance ==
The album was released June 7, 1975, on the Epic imprint-label T-Neck Records in the United States. It was also made available that same year in 8-track cartridge and cassette formats, while Epic issued an LP release for distribution in the Netherlands. The Heat Is On charted on June 14, 1975, and spent 40 weeks on the Billboard Pop Albums chart. It became the Isley Brothers' first album to hit number one on the chart, which had been considered a rare feat for a black band at the time (the only other black bands who scored a number-one album on the pop charts were their funk contemporaries The Ohio Players and Earth, Wind & Fire). The Heat Is On also peaked at number one on the Billboard Black Albums chart.

The album's first single, "Fight the Power (Part 1 & 2)" was certified gold for sales of over one million copies. The single peaked at number one on the Billboard R&B chart for 3 weeks, longer than any other single of the year. "Fight the Power" was named the Top R&B single of 1975 in Billboard's year end issue. It also reached number 4 on the pop chart and number two on the Club Play Singles chart. The second single, "For the Love of You (Part 1 & 2)", reached number 10 on the R&B chart, and peaked at number 22 on the Billboard Pop Singles. In its first month of release, it sold over 500,000 copies, and by 1992, it had shipped in excess of one million copies. On August 17, 1999, The Heat Is On was certified double platinum by the Recording Industry Association of America (RIAA), following shipments in excess of two million copies in the United States.

== Track listing ==
Adapted from liner notes

All tracks are written by Ernie Isley, Marvin Isley, Rudolph Isley, O'Kelly Isley, Ronald Isley and Chris Jasper.

Side One
No.	Title	Length
1.	"Fight the Power (Part 1 & 2)"	5:19
2.	"The Heat Is On (Part 1 & 2)"	5:37
3.	"Hope You Feel Better Love (Part 1 & 2)"	6:06

Side Two
No.	Title	Length
4.	"For the Love of You (Part 1 & 2)"	5:38
5.	"Sensuality (Part 1 & 2)"	6:52
6.	"Make Me Say It Again Girl (Part 1 & 2)"	7:43

2001 reissue bonus track
No.	Title	Length
7.	"Fight The Power" (Live at Bearsville Studios)	3:57

== Legacy ==
The album cut "Make Me Say It Again Girl (Part 1 & 2)" was remade into a duet with R&B recording artist Beyoncé in 2022, peaking at number nine on the US R&B/Hip-Hop Airplay chart, twenty on the US Hot R&B Songs chart, and number one on the US Adult R&B Songs chart, remaining on the chart for 37 weeks. It reached the top of the charts in seven weeks, remained in top position for five weeks, and became their first top 10 airplay hit in over 20 years.

The single "Fight the Power (Part 1 & 2)" and its lyric "We gotta fight the powers that be" was interpolated into Public Enemy's 1989 rap song "Fight the Power."

== Personnel ==
Musicians

- Ernie Isley – six-string & 12-string acoustic guitars (4, 6), electric guitar (1–3), drums (1–6), congas, percussion (4, 6),maracas, timbales, background vocals
- Marvin Isley – bass guitar (1–6), background vocals
- O'Kelly Isley Jr. – background vocals, lead vocals (5)
- Ronald Isley – lead vocals, background vocals
- Rudolph Isley – background vocals
- Chris Jasper – clavinet (1–2), Moog synthesizer (6), ARP synthesizer, electric piano (1–6), tambourine (4), congas, keyboards (6), percussion (4, 6), acoustic piano, background vocals

Production

- Malcolm Cecil – associate producer, engineering, electronic music programming
- Kent Duncan – mastering
- The Isley Brothers – producers, musical arrangements
- Robert Margouleff – associate producer, engineering, electronic music programming

== Charts ==
Album

Chart (1975)	Peak position
U.S. Billboard Pop Albums	1
U.S. Billboard Black Albums	1
Australian (Kent Music Report)|	99

Singles

Song	Chart (1975)	Peak position
"Fight the Power (Part 1 & 2)"	U.S. Billboard Club Play Singles	2
"For the Love of You (Part 1 & 2)"	U.S. Billboard Pop Singles	22

== Release history ==
Adapted from the liner notes.

Region	Year	Label	Format	Catalog
United States	1975	T-Neck Records	vinyl LP	PZ 33536
United States	1975	T-Neck	8-track cartridge, quadrophonic	ZAQ 33536
United States	1975	T-Neck	cassette, stereo	PZT 33536
Netherlands	1975	Epic Records	vinyl LP	EPC 69139
United States	1975	T-Neck	vinyl LP, quadraphonic, 33 ⅓ RPM	PZQ 33536
Japan	1995	Sony Records	remastered CD	SRCS 6464
United States	2001	Epic	remastered CD	EK 85315
United States	2001	CBS	remastered CD	ZK 33536
