= Make Me Say It Again, Girl (song) =

Single by the Isley Brothers featuring Beyoncé

from the album Make Me Say It Again, Girl
- Released: August 12, 2022
- Recorded: 2021
- Studio: The Trailer (East Hampton, NY); Kendun Recorders (Burbank, CA)
- Genre: Soul
- Length: 5:14 (single version); 7:46 (extended version)
- Label: RI Top Ten
- Songwriters: Chris Jasper; Rudolph Isley; O’Kelly Isley; Marvin Isley; Ernie Isley; Ronald Isley
- Producers: The Isley Brothers; Beyoncé

The Isley Brothers singles chronology
| "Friends And Family" (2021) | "Make Me Say It Again, Girl" (2022) | "The Plug" (2022) |

Beyoncé singles chronology
| "Break My Soul" (2022) | "Make Me Say It Again, Girl" (2022) | "Cuff It" (2022) |

Lyric video
- "Make Me Say It Again, Girl" on YouTube

"Make Me Say It Again, Girl" is a song recorded by American recording artists the Isley Brothers featuring Beyoncé for their 2022 comeback album of the same name. The song was released in August 2022 as the album's second single. The recording is a remake of a song originally written and recorded for the 1975 album The Heat Is On. Written by Chris Jasper, Rudolph Isley, O’Kelly Isley, Marvin Isley, Ernie Isley, and Ronald Isley, the remake peaked at number nine on the US R&B/Hip-Hop Airplay chart, twenty on the US Hot R&B Songs chart, and number one on the US Adult R&B Songs chart, remaining for 37 weeks. It reached the top of the charts in seven weeks, remained in the top position for five weeks, and became their first top 10 hit in over 20 years since Grammy nominated single “Contagious” peaked at No. 1 on the chart.

== Background and composition ==
“Make Me Say It Again, Girl” originally appeared on the Isley Brothers’ 1975 album The Heat Is On as a two-part movement: “Make Me Say It Again Girl (Part 1 & 2).” The Heat Is On was met with immense success, with certifications for two million copies sold in the United States, becoming the group's first No. 1 project on the Billboard 200 Albums Chart. Coincidentally, the opening track from Destiny's Child’s eponymous 1998 debut studio album, “Second Nature,” sampled “Make Me Say It Again Girl (Part 1 & 2).” Nearly 25 years later, Destiny's Child singer Knowles and Ronald Isley were able to co-ordinate their schedules and collaborate, with Knowles imitating some of her previous 1998 harmonies as backing vocals throughout the song, climaxing in a "quintessentially Queen Bey a cappella outro... harmoniz[ing] with herself over multiple layered vocal tracks."

The duet was first teased in 2021 alongside a potential collaboration with Drake when the parent album was announced on American music magazine website Variety as well as Rap-Up.

In an interview with Billboard, Isley revealed that he “met and talked to Beyoncé when she was just getting started with Destiny’s Child,” and that “working with Beyoncé was one of the first things [he] thought about” when he began crafting his new album. Isley's wife, Kandy, added, “Tina Knowles-Lawson [Beyoncé’s mother] was very influential in getting this record started and getting it to the point where we are now. She has a love for the Isley Brothers and her daughter grew up listening to this type of music. All we can say is that God’s hands was on this whole project.” "Between Beyoncé’s undeniable talent and [producer/engineer] Tony Maserati’s superb job at blending her and Ronald’s voices — he made it sound like she was right there with Ronald in the same room.”

In a December 2023 interview for songwriter Claude Kelly's WeSoundCrazy Podcast, Isley called Beyoncé and her mother "incredible", further revealing that Beyoncé did not want payment or royalties for the duet, but instead wanted all resulting proceeds to be a "gift to them."

== Reception ==
The song was met with critical acclaim, highlighting the song's "smoothness" and the vocals. Althea Legaspi of Rolling Stone lauded Knowles' "dreamy backing vocals" throughout the track, as well as Isley's "buttery smooth tenor." A consortium of Urban adult contemporary radio programmers named the song their fifth-best pick for 2022. Vibe ranked the song fifteenth on their "25 Best R&B Songs of 2022", noting that it could "easily stand up against its original two-part swoon-worthy version."

== Personnel ==
Credits adapted from YouTube Music.

- Ronald Isley – Performer, Lead vocals, Background vocals, Producer, Songwriter
- Beyoncé Giselle Knowles-Carter – Performer, Lead vocals, Background vocals, Vocal Production
- The Isley Brothers - Performers
- Marvin Isley - Songwriter, Bass Guitar
- Rudolph Isley - Songwriter
- O'Kelly Isley - Songwriter
- Ernie Isley - Songwriter, 12-String Guitar, 6-String Guitar, Drums
- Chris Jasper - Songwriter, Electric Piano, Synthesizer (Moog & Arp)
- Tony Maserati - Mixing Engineer, Recording Engineer

== Charts ==
=== Weekly charts ===
Weekly chart performance for "Make Me Say It Again, Girl"
| Chart (2022–2023) | Peak position |
|---|---|
| US R&B/Hip-Hop Airplay (Billboard) | 9 |
| US Adult R&B Songs (Billboard) | 1 |
| US Hot R&B Songs (Billboard) | 20 |

=== Year-end charts ===
| Chart (2022) | Position |
|---|---|
| US Billboard Adult R&B Songs | 27 |

| Chart (2023) | Position |
|---|---|
| US Billboard Adult R&B Songs | 8 |

== Awards and nominations ==
| Year | Ceremony | Award | Result | Ref |
|---|---|---|---|---|
| 2024 | ASCAP Rhythm & Soul Awards | Most Performed R&B/Hip-Hop Songs | Won | |

== Release history ==
"Make Me Say It Again, Girl" release history
| Region | Date | Format(s) | Version | Label(s) | Ref. |
|---|---|---|---|---|---|
| Worldwide | August 11, 2022 | | Single Version | RI Top Ten | |
| United States | August 16, 2022 | Urban adult contemporary radio; urban contemporary radio | Single Version | RI Top Ten | |
| Worldwide | September 30, 2022 | | Extended Version | RI Top Ten | |
