= Inside You =

Studio album by the Isley Brothers
- Released: December 1, 1981
- Recorded: 1981
- Studio: Bearsville (Woodstock, New York)
- Genre: Funk, soul
- Length: 38:59
- Label: T-Neck Records
- Producer: The Isley Brothers

The Isley Brothers chronology
Grand Slam (1981)	Inside You (1981)	The Real Deal (1982)

Inside You is the 20th album by the Isley Brothers, released on T-Neck Records on December 1, 1981.

The album was remastered and expanded for inclusion in the 2015 released CD box set The RCA Victor & T-Neck Album Masters, 1959-1983.

== Reception ==
Professional ratings
Review scores
Source	Rating
AllMusic	3/5 stars

Despite the post disco title track being a top ten hit on the Billboard Hot Soul Singles chart, the album became the band's first since 1972's Brother, Brother, Brother to not be awarded an RIAA certification after nine consecutive albums had been certified gold or platinum.

== Track listing ==
All tracks are written by O'Kelly Isley, Rudolph Isley, Ernie Isley, Ronald Isley, Marvin Isley and Chris Jasper, except where noted.

Side one
No.	Title	Length
1.	"Inside You (Part I & II)"	9:03
2.	"Baby Hold On"	4:22
3.	"Don't Hold Back Your Love (Part I & II)"	6:20
Total length:		19:45

Side two
No.	Title	Writer(s)	Length
4.	"First Love"	David Townsend	4:37
5.	"Love Merry-Go-Round"		5:07
6.	"Welcome to My Heart"		5:02
7.	"Love Zone"		4:28
Total length:			19:14

== Personnel ==
The Isley Brothers

- Ronald Isley – lead vocals
- Rudolph Isley, O'Kelly Isley – background vocals
- Ernie Isley – lead and rhythm guitars, percussion and drums (track 2)
- Marvin Isley – bass, percussion
- Chris Jasper – all keyboards, percussion, vibes, string and horn arrangements

Guest Musicians

- Everett Collins – drums (tracks 1, 3–7)
- Kevin Jones – congas, percussion
- Gene Orloff – concertmaster (tracks 1–3, 5–7)
- Marilyn Wright – violin (tracks 1–3, 5–7)
- Harold Kohon – violin (tracks 1–3, 5–7)
- Winteron Garvey – violin (tracks 1–3, 5–7)
- Marvin Morgenstern – violin (tracks 1, 3, 5, 6)
- Richard Young – violin (tracks 1–3, 5–7)
- Anahid Ajemian – violin (tracks 1, 3, 5, 6)
- Fred Buldrini – violin (tracks 1, 3, 5, 6)
- Kermit Moore – cello (tracks 1–3, 5–7)
- Johnathan Abramowitz – cello (tracks 1, 3, 5, 6)
- Alfred V. Brown – viola (tracks 1, 3, 5, 6)
- Julian C. Barber – viola (tracks 1–3, 5–7)
- Gloria Agostini – harp (track 3)
- Eve Otto – harp (track 6)
- Guy Lumis – violin (tracks 2, 7)
- Gerald Tarack – violin (tracks 2, 7)
- Louann Montesi – violin (tracks 2, 7)
- Fred Zlotkin – cello (tracks 2, 7)
- Mitsue Takayama – viola (tracks 2, 7)
- Mike Spengler, Pete Ramaglia – trumpet (track 4)
- Wayne A. Wofford – alto saxophone (track 4)

== Charts ==
Chart (1981)	Peak position
Billboard Pop Albums	45
Billboard Top Soul Albums	8

=== Singles ===
Year	Single	Chart positions
Year	Single	US R&B
1981	"Inside You"	10
1982	"Welcome Into My Heart"	45
