= Givin' It Back =

Studio album by The Isley Brothers
- Released: September 25, 1971
- Recorded: 1971
- Studios: Mediasound, New York City
- Genres: Psychedelic soul; rock; funk
- Length: 41:47
- Label: T-Neck/Buddah
- Producers: Ronald Isley, Rudolph Isley

The Isley Brothers chronology
Get Into Something (1970)	Givin' It Back (1971)	Brother, Brother, Brother (1972)

Singles from Givin' It Back
- 1. "Love the One You're With" Released: May 1971; 2. "Spill the Wine" Released: September 1971; 3. "Lay Lady Lay" Released: November 1971

Givin' It Back is the ninth album released by The Isley Brothers on their T-Neck imprint on September 25, 1971. After years of having other acts covering their most famed material, particularly "Shout" (1959) and "Twist and Shout" (1961), the Isleys decided to do the same to music made famous by artists such as Stephen Stills, Eric Burdon and Neil Young. Among the songs they covered were "Spill the Wine", "Love the One You're With", the social commentary medley of "Ohio" and "Machine Gun" (from Jimi Hendrix), "Fire and Rain" by James Taylor and Bob Dylan's "Lay Lady Lay". The Isleys' perseverance paid off when their covers of "Love the One You're With", "Lay Lady Lay" and "Spill the Wine" became charted hits. Bill Withers plays guitar on the Isleys' version of his "Cold Bologna".

The album was remastered and expanded for inclusion in the 2015 released 23-CD box set The RCA Victor & T-Neck Album Masters (1959–1983).

== Reception ==
Professional ratings
Review scores
Source	Rating
AllMusic	4/5 stars
Christgau's Record Guide	B
Pitchfork	8.3/10
Uncut	3/5 stars

== Track listing ==
Side One
No.	Title	Writer(s)	Length
1.	"Ohio" / "Machine Gun"	Neil Young / Jimi Hendrix	9:13
2.	"Fire and Rain"	James Taylor	5:29
3.	"Lay Lady Lay"	Bob Dylan	10:22
Total length:			25:04

Side Two
No.	Title	Writer(s)	Length
4.	"Spill the Wine"	Charles Miller, Howard E. Scott, B.B. Dickerson, Lonnie Jordan, Harold Ray Brown, Thomas "Papa Dee" Allen, Lee Oskar	6:32
5.	"Nothing to Do But Today"	Stephen Stills	3:42
6.	"Cold Bologna"	Bill Withers	3:03
7.	"Love the One You're With"	Stephen Stills	3:40
Total length:			16:57

== Trivia ==
The only other recording of "Cold Bologna" is found on the 1973 Bill Withers live album, Live at Carnegie Hall as "Harlem/Cold Baloney".

== Personnel ==
- Ronald Isley – lead and backing vocals
- O'Kelly Isley Jr. and Rudolph Isley – backing vocals
- Ernie Isley – lead guitar (1–5, 7), rhythm guitar, drums
- Marvin Isley – bass guitar
- Chris Jasper – piano
- Chester Woodard – lead guitar (1–5, 7), rhythm guitar
- Bill Withers – lead guitar (6)
- Milton Westley – organ
- John Mosley – flute
- George Moreland – drums, percussion
- Gary Jones – congas (1–6)
- Buck Clarke – congas (7)

Technical & arrangements

- Produced by Ronald Isley & Rudolph Isley
- Hal Wilson – photography
- George Patterson – musical arrangements
- The Isley Brothers – musical arrangements
