= Timeless (Isley Brothers album) =

Greatest hits album by The Isley Brothers
- Released: 1978
- Genre: Funk
- Length: 87:40
- Label: T-Neck Records

The Isley Brothers chronology
Showdown (1978)	Timeless (1978)	Winner Takes All (1979)

Timeless is a double compilation album by funk group The Isley Brothers, released in 1978. It contains their pre-1973 hits in association with Buddah Records, but now distributed by Epic Records.

Professional ratings
Review scores
Source	Rating
Allmusic	link
Christgau's Record Guide	B+
Smash Hits	5/10

== Track listing ==
All tracks are written by Rudolph Isley, O'Kelly Isley and Ronald Isley, except where noted.

Side one
No.	Title	Writer(s)	Length
1.	"It's Your Thing"		2:47
2.	"Love the One You're With"	Stephen Stills	3:40
3.	"I Know You've Been Socking It To"		2:42
4.	"Get into Something"		7:29
5.	"I Need You So"		4:23

Side two
No.	Title	Writer(s)	Length
6.	"Work to Do"		3:11
7.	"Brother, Brother"	Carole King	3:16
8.	"Keep on Doin'"		4:02
9.	"I Turned You On"		2:37
10.	"Put a Little Love in Your Heart"	Randy Myers, Jackie DeShannon, Jimmy Holiday	3:01

Side three
No.	Title	Writer(s)	Length
1.	"Pop That Thang"		3:16
2.	"Lay, Lady, Lay"	Bob Dylan	4:54
3.	"Spill the Wine"	Charles Miller, Howard E. Scott, B.B. Dickerson, Lonnie Jordan, Harold Ray Brown, Thomas "Papa Dee" Allen, Lee Oskar, Eric Burdon	6:30
4.	"Fire and Rain"	James Taylor	5:29
5.	"Freedom"		3:38

Side four
No.	Title	Writer(s)	Length
6.	"Ohio / Machine Gun"	Neil Young / Jimi Hendrix	8:50
7.	"Nothing to Do But Today"	Stephen Stills	3:42
8.	"Lay Away"		3:22
9.	"If He Can You Can"	Rudolph Isley, O'Kelly Isley, Ronald Isley, Johnny Brantly	3:43
10.	"It's Too Late"	Carole King, Toni Stern	7:08
