= Between the Sheets (song) =

Single by the Isley Brothers

from the album Between the Sheets
- Released: March 9, 1983
- Recorded: February 1983
- Studio: Bearsville Studios, New York
- Genre: R&B; quiet storm
- Length: 5:38
- Label: T-Neck 03797
- Songwriters: Rudolph Isley; O'Kelly Isley, Jr.; Ronald Isley; Ernest Isley; Marvin Isley; Chris Jasper
- Producers: Ronald Isley; Rudolph Isley

The Isley Brothers singles chronology
"All in My Lover's Eyes" (1983)	"Between the Sheets" (1983)	"Choosey Lover" (1983)

"Between the Sheets" is a quiet storm-funk song released by the American band the Isley Brothers in 1983 off their album of the same name on the T-Neck imprint.

== Composition ==
With a tempo of 84 beats per minute, "Between the Sheets" is in the key of A minor.

== Personnel ==
- Lead vocals by Ronald Isley
- Background vocals by Rudolph Isley, O'Kelly Isley, Jr. and Chris Jasper
- Additional percussion by Ernie Isley
- Bass guitar & additional percussion by Marvin Isley
- Keyboards, synthesizers and drum machine programming by Chris Jasper

== Chart performance ==
Chart (1983)	Peak position
US Hot R&B/Hip-Hop Songs	3
UK Singles Chart	52

== In popular culture ==
- It appears in the 2004 video game Grand Theft Auto: San Andreas in the fictional radio station Bounce FM.

== Samples of this song ==
This track has been sampled extensively, among the samples:

- "I Don't Want To Treat You Wrong" by MC Shy D (1988)
- "The Questions" by Audio Two (1988)
- "For the Easy Listeners" by DJ Magic Mike (1990)
- "Bonita Applebum (Hootie Mix)" by A Tribe Called Quest (1990)
- "Breaker 1/9" by Common (1992)
- "Cramping My Style" by UGK (1992)
- "I Don't Even Trip" by Totally Insane (1992)
- "Solo per Te" by Articolo 31 (1993)
- "Another Day" Mac Clan-Livin the Life (1993) (edited by KILLA E)
- "Lips" by Dre Dog/Andre Nickatina (1993)
- "Break of Dawn" by Rob Base (1994)
- "Time To Get My Drank On" Thug Life (Unreleased Demo) (1994)
- "Big Poppa" by The Notorious B.I.G. (1994)
- "Funkdafied" by Da Brat (1994)
- "Old School" by Aaliyah (1994)
- "Pass The J" by DJ Hard (1994)
- "The Most Beautifullest Thing in This World" by Keith Murray (1994)
- "Get with You" by Phunk Addict Crew (1995)
- "Super G" by MVP & The Monsta Klick (1995)
- "Nika" by Lil' Vicious (1995)
- "Fed Up wit the Bullshit" by Big L (1995)
- "Superman" by Skee-Lo (1995)
- "Za Sve Oko Mene" by Tram 11 (1999)
- Witness by Shelley Gaines (2000)
- "Summer wit Miami" by Jim Jones (2005)
- "Comin' on Strong" by Tupac Shakur (2006)
- "On the Hotline" by Pretty Ricky (2006)
- "Cali Niggaz (Young Niggaz)" by The Game (2007)
- "Ignorant Shit Freestyle" by Lupe Fiasco (2007)
- "Never Can Say Goodbye" by The Game (2008)
- "Coming on Strong" by Plies and Ron Isley
- "Real Plexxx" by Lil B
- "Back2Mackin" by Vistoso Bosses (2010)
- "Rich Nigga Dick" by J. Stalin (2010)
- "Juke Juke" by Chance The Rapper (2012)
- "Another Night" by Ronald Isley (2013)
- "Wrong In The Right Way" by Chris Brown and Tyga (2015)
- "Pick Yourself Up" by Big K.R.I.T. (2018)
- "Like That" by Doja Cat (2019)

== Covers ==
- Jazz band Fourplay recorded a hit cover version of the song in 1992 with Chaka Khan as the vocalist.
