= Freedom (Isley Brothers song) =

Single by the Isley Brothers

from the album Get into Something
- B-side: "I Need You So"
- Released: 1970
- Recorded: 1970
- Studio: Record Plant, Los Angeles
- Genre: Funk rock
- Length: 3:37
- Label: T-Neck
- Songwriter(s): O'Kelly Isley, Ronald Isley, Rudolph Isley
- Producer(s): O'Kelly Isley, Ronald Isley, Rudolph Isley

The Isley Brothers singles chronology
"Get into Something" (1970)	"Freedom" (1970)	"Warpath" (1971)

"Freedom" is a 1970 R&B / funk song released by the Isley Brothers on their T-Neck imprint. The song was written and produced by O'Kelly Isley, Ronald Isley, and Rudolph Isley.

== Chart performance ==
The song was issued on their 1970 album, Get into Something, and was one of six R&B charting hits the group scored from the album, peaking at number 11. On the pop chart, it reached number 72.
