= Get into Something =

Album by The Isley Brothers

Get Into Something

Studio album by The Isley Brothers
- Released: March 8, 1970
- Recorded: 1969
- Studio: A&R (New York City)
- Genres: Funk; soul
- Length: 39:36
- Label: T-Neck/Buddah Records
- Producers: Ronald Isley, Rudolph Isley

The Isley Brothers chronology
| Live at Yankee Stadium (1969) | Get Into Something (1970) | Givin' It Back (1971) |

Singles from Get Into Something
- 1. "Keep on Doin'" Released: February 1970; 2. "Freedom" Released: December 1970

Professional ratings
Review scores
| Source | Rating |
|---|---|
| AllMusic | 3/5 stars |
| Christgau's Record Guide | B |
| The Encyclopedia of Popular Music | 3/5 stars |
| Pitchfork | 6.6/10 |
| Uncut | 3/5 stars |

Get Into Something is the eighth album by the Isley Brothers, released on their T-Neck imprint in 1970. Although the album itself did not chart, it includes six songs that appeared in the top 30 of the Billboard R&B chart between late 1969 and early 1971 (most of which dented the lower reaches of the Billboard Hot 100 as well): the title track, "Bless Your Heart", the horn and drum-driven "Keep on Doin'" (which inspired the instrumental cover by The J.B.'s later that year under the title "The Grunt"), "Freedom", "Girls Will Be Girls" and "If He Can You Can".

The album's title track includes a James Brown-styled "give the drummer some" breakdown that was highly influential on the New York b-boy dance scene (later known as breakdancing). The drum break, along with the LP's scarcity, has made this the most valuable and highly sought after Isley Brothers album among vinyl record collectors. It was remastered and expanded for inclusion in the 2015 23 CD box set The RCA Victor & T-Neck Album Masters (1959–1983).

== Critical reception ==
Newsday, reviewing a reissue, called the album "a raw raveup with a punchy horn section," writing that "the Isleys venture into James Brown territory with the stripped-down funk of 'Keep On Doin' '." Rolling Stone wrote that the album "balances fidgety, syncopated riffs (somebody should sample that title cut) with true-believer gospel harmonies." William D. Laffler of United Press International stated that the album "keeps the rhythm hopping on."

== Track listing ==
All tracks are written by O'Kelly Isley, Ronald Isley and Rudolph Isley, except where noted.

Side one
| No. | Title | Length |
|---|---|---|
| 1. | "Get Into Something" | 7:29 |
| 2. | "Freedom" | 3:38 |
| 3. | "Take Inventory" | 2:46 |
| 4. | "Keep on Doin'" | 4:02 |

Side two
| No. | Title | Writer(s) | Length |
|---|---|---|---|
| 5. | "Girls Will Be Girls" | | 2:50 |
| 6. | "I Need You So (Note: O'Kelly Isley, Jr.)" | | 4:24 |
| 7. | "If He Can You Can (Note: Ronald and Rudolph share lead vocals during the verses.)" | Johnny Brantly, O'Kelly Isley, Ronald Isley, Rudolph Isley | 3:44 |
| 8. | "I Got to Find Me One (Note: Rudolph Isley)" | | 4:37 |
| 9. | "Beautiful" | | 3:05 |
| 10. | "Bless Your Heart" | | 3:03 |

Ronald Isley sings lead on all tracks except:

== Personnel ==
The Isley Brothers

- Ronald Isley – lead vocals and backing vocals
- O'Kelly Isley Jr. and Rudolph Isley – backing vocals and lead vocals
- Ernie Isley – bass guitar

with

- Charles "Skip" Pitts – guitars
- Truman Thomas – organ
- Everett Collins – keyboards
- George Moreland – drums
- George Patterson – arrangements
- Horns arranged by The Isley Brothers
