= High Wire (Ernie Isley album) =

Studio album by Ernie Isley
- Released: 1990
- Genres: R&B, funk, rock
- Label: Elektra
- Producer: Davitt Sigerson

High Wire is the debut album by the American musician Ernie Isley, released in 1990.

The album peaked at No. 174 on the Billboard 200. The title track was the album's first single.

== Production ==
The album was produced by Davitt Sigerson, with Isley playing most of the instruments himself. It was recorded in Los Angeles and New York.

== Critical reception ==
Professional ratings
Review scores
Source	Rating
AllMusic	4.5/5 stars
Chicago Tribune	3.5/4 stars
MusicHound Rock: The Essential Album Guide	4/5 stars
Orlando Sentinel	4/5 stars
The Rolling Stone Album Guide	3.5/5 stars

The Washington Post wrote: "Not surprisingly, Isley's guitar playing is def and deft; surprisingly, it's Isley's songwriting and emotionally direct singing that makes the album more than a showcase of knife-sharp riffs and roiling grooves." The Chicago Tribune thought that Isley's "keening intro on 'Rising From the Ashes', the snakelike soloing on 'Song for the Muses', the brief glimpse of country blues on 'In Deep' all demonstrate he belongs with the guitar giants." The New York Times called High Wire "the surprise pop album of the year," writing that "if it doesn't make it on radio ... it is because its synthesis of black pop styles and rock-and-roll defies the rigidity of labels." Entertainment Weekly considered it the ninth best album of 1990, praising its "six-string pyrotechnics and solid songs that both Luther Vandross and Living Colour would kill for."

AllMusic called the album "an astonishingly diverse solo debut." The Rolling Stone Album Guide cautioned that "when the opportunity to play a solo presents itself, Ernie Isley usually winds up playing two or three."

== Track listing ==
No.	Title	Length
1.	"Song for the Muses"	7:38
2.	"High Wire"	5:27
3.	"Love Situation"	3:02
4.	"Diamond in the Rough"	5:00
5.	"Deal with It"	4:43
6.	"In Deep"	0:25
7.	"She Takes Me Up"	4:34
8.	"Fare Thee Well, Fair-Weather Friend"	3:58
9.	"Rising from the Ashes"	4:50
10.	"Deep Water"	4:20
11.	"Back to Square One"	6:01
12.	"The Muses"	0:32
