= Bearsville Studios =

Recording studio in Bearsville, New York, United States

Coordinates: 42°2′38″N 74°8′42″W

Bearsville Sound Studios
- Industry: Recording studio
- Founded: 1969
- Founder: Albert Grossman
- Defunct: 2004
- Fate: Sold
- Headquarters: Bearsville, New York, U.S.
- Number of locations: 1

Bearsville Sound Studio was an independent residential recording studio founded by Albert Grossman in the Bearsville section of Woodstock, New York. From the late 1960s through the early 2000s, the studios were the site of notable recordings by numerous artists including Ozzy Osbourne, Todd Rundgren, Meat Loaf, Tesla, R.E.M., Jeff Buckley, Dave Matthews Band, Phish and others.

== History ==
=== Background ===
Albert Grossman, who was the manager of Bob Dylan and Peter, Paul and Mary, first arrived in Bearsville in 1964 with his future wife, Sally, and Dylan via Dylan's station wagon, and went to work creating a retreat for the community of artists with whom he worked. The Bearsville recording studios would be just one component of the complex that would eventually include Bearsville Records, Turtle Creek Barn and Apartments, Location Recorders, the Bearsville Theatre, and multiple restaurants. The two-hour drive from New York City, a "retreat" for some artists, combined with residences owned by Albert Grossman, amplified this value.

=== 1969-1979 ===
Bearsville's first recording studio, Studio B, was completed in 1969. Studio B was initially designed by Robert Hansen and later re-designed and modified by John Storyk of the Walters-Storyk Design Group and acoustician George Augspurger. The larger Studio A featured a large 2,400 square foot tracking room with a 35-foot high ceiling. Originally intended as a project studio for Robbie Robertson and Garth Hudson of the Band, Turtle Creek Barn and Apartments offered recording facilities combined with a private living space.

Todd Rundgren began working at Bearsville Studios as a staff engineer and producer, and recorded his first three studio albums at Bearsville. Beginning in 1975, Meat Loaf and composer Jim Steinman recorded Bat Out of Hell at Bearsville, which became one of the best-selling albums of all time.

Other artists recording at Bearsville in the 1970s included The Isley Brothers, NRBQ, Patti Smith Group, and Foghat. Additionally, the Rolling Stones rehearsed at Bearsville from May 27 until June 8, 1978, for their US Tour 1978, with the recordings of these rehearsals later released as the Complete Woodstock Tapes 4-disc set.

=== 1980s ===
In 1980, Grossman built Rundgren's Utopia Video Studio, which would later house radio station WDST. In 1985, a remodel of Studio A was completed, including the addition of a Neve 8088 recording console custom-built for and previously in use at The Who's Ramport Studios.

In 1986, Grossman's wife Sally assumed directorship of Bearsville following his death. From 1986 to 1989, Bearsville hosted recording sessions for The Pretenders, Marshall Crenshaw, Suzanne Vega, Joe Jackson, and others, and Tesla recorded their first two studio albums at the studios.

In 1988, The Replacements had a 10-day recording session at Bearsville during which they trashed the recording studio and living quarters and played a game they called "dodge knife" that was like dodgeball but using knives. The recordings, originally intended for the band's album Don't Tell a Soul were not included on the album. They were eventually released in 2019 as part of the Dead Man's Pop box set.

R.E.M. recorded significant portions of three successive albums at Bearsville, beginning with Green (1988). The music historian Barney Hoskyns, in his 2016 book about Woodstock, Small Town Talk, wrote that the band's presence "was certainly a highwater mark in the studio's life."

In 1989 a barn was converted to create the Bearsville Theater, with space for rehearsals and live performances.

=== 1990s ===
In the early 1990s, Bearsville hosted sessions to record albums for Living Colour and the Connells. In late 1993 and early 1994, Jeff Buckley recorded his only studio album, Grace at Bearsville. Blues Traveler recorded their breakthrough 1994 album Four (Blues Traveler album) at the studio. Dave Matthews Band recorded its debut studio album Under the Table and Dreaming (1994) at Bearsville with producer Steve Lillywhite, as well as its follow-up, Crash (Dave Matthews Band album) (1996). The studio was the location for the recording of Natalie Merchant's debut solo album Tigerlily (1995), as well as albums by Rush, Phish, Fear Factory, Faith No More, and Branford Marsalis Quartet.

=== 2000s ===
In the early 2000s, Bearsville hosted recording sessions for artists including Harvey Danger, Matchbox Twenty, The Derek Trucks Band, Saliva, The Vines and others. In 2005, the building that housed the original Bearsville Studios A and B was sold, with Sally Grossman utilizing components from the former studios to repurpose the Turtle Creek Barn into a new studio named Bearsville at Turtle Creek. By 2007, Sally Grossman had sold all Bearsville complex properties, including the Turtle Creek Barn, the Bearsville Theater, two restaurants, and the Utopia soundstage.

== Bearsville Center (2019-present) ==
In August 2019, the Bearsville Theatre complex was purchased by Lizzie Vann, who re-opened the complex as the Bearsville Center. This set in motion a multi-million-dollar renovation of the complex to repair extensive water damage from roof leaks.

== Selected list of albums recorded at Bearsville Studios (by year) ==
- 1970 - Todd Rundgren - Runt
- 1971 - The Band - Cahoots
- 1972 - Todd Rundgren - Something/Anything?
- 1974 - Claude Dubois - Claude Dubois
- 1977 - The Isley Brothers - Go for Your Guns
- 1977 - Meat Loaf - Bat Out of Hell
- 1977 - Utopia - Ra
- 1978 - NRBQ - At Yankee Stadium
- 1978 - The Isley Brothers - Showdown (Isley Brothers album)
- 1979 - Patti Smith Group - Wave
- 1980 - NRBQ - Tiddlywinks
- 1981 - Jim Steinman - Bad for Good
- 1983 - NRBQ - Grooves in Orbit
- 1986 - The Pretenders - Get Close
- 1986 - Tesla - Mechanical Resonance
- 1987 - Marshall Crenshaw - Mary Jean & 9 Others
- 1987 - Suzanne Vega - Solitude Standing
- 1988 - Joe Jackson - Blaze of Glory
- 1988 - Tesla - The Great Radio Controversy
- 1991 - R.E.M. - Out of Time
- 1992 - R.E.M. - Automatic for the People
- 1993 - Deep Purple - The Battle Rages On...
- 1993 - Living Colour - Stain
- 1994 - Jeff Buckley - Grace
- 1994 - Dave Matthews Band - Under the Table and Dreaming
- 1994 - Blues Traveler - four
- 1995 - Fear Factory - Demanufacture
- 1995 - Faith No More - King for a Day... Fool for a Lifetime
- 1995 - Natalie Merchant - Tigerlily
- 1996 - Rush - Test for Echo
- 1996 - Phish - Billy Breathes
- 1996 - Dave Matthews Band - Crash
- 1998 - Phish - The Story of the Ghost
- 1998 - Fighting Gravity - You and Everybody Else
- 1999 - Skunk Anansie - Post Orgasmic Chill
- 2000 - Branford Marsalis Quartet - Contemporary Jazz
- 2000 - Harvey Danger - King James Version
- 2001 - Hedwig and the Angry Inch Motion Picture Soundtrack
- 2002 - Matchbox Twenty - More Than You Think You Are
- 2003 - Thrice - The Artist in the Ambulance
- 2004 - The Vines - Winning Days
- 2005 - Thrice - Vheissu
- 2005 - Matt Pond PA - Several Arrows Later
