= T-Neck Records =

American record label

- Parent company: Sony Music Entertainment
- Founded: 1964
- Founder: The Isley Brothers
- Distributor(s): Atlantic, Buddah, CBS, Island, DreamWorks
- Genre: Soul, funk, R&B, rock
- Country of origin: U.S.

T-Neck Records was a record label founded by members of the R&B/soul group The Isley Brothers in 1964, which became notable for distributing the first nationally-released recordings of Jimi Hendrix, their guitarist, and which later became a successful label after the Isleys began releasing their own works after years of recording for other labels, scoring hits such as "It's Your Thing" (1969) and "That Lady" (1973).

== History ==
=== Conception ===
The Isley Brothers had been recording music professionally since 1957 and had struggled with the release of many of its recordings. Encouraged by the million-selling success of their 1959 single "Shout", which the trio wrote, the trio formed the Three Boys Music publishing company, which would include their own compositions including later songs "Respectable" and "Nobody But Me", all of which helped to earn the brothers monetary royalties after the songs were licensed to other artists who covered the tunes including The Yardbirds and The Human Beinz.

After not scoring any major hits after RCA's release of "Shout", they moved to the Wand label in 1961, where they recorded the Bert Berns dance number "Twist & Shout", that would be released in 1962. The song became the brothers' first single to score success on the main US pop chart (#17) and the R&B chart (#2), and also scored moderate international success as it reached #42 in the United Kingdom. However, the band did not capitalize on any further hits at Wand, much like the issue at RCA, and began recording for United Artists Records in 1963. "Nobody But Me" was released on that label, but the group's tenure with United Artists was short-lived.

In 1964, they signed with Atlantic Records and released their penned composition, "Who's That Lady", which also failed to chart. In the meantime, the success of "Shout" by other pop and rock acts had helped the song sell well over two million records in various versions. This allowed the brothers, who owned the song as part of their Three Boys Music company, to move the family out of the Cincinnati suburb of Lincoln Heights into a house in Englewood, New Jersey. Meanwhile, the three brothers of the group - Kelly, Rudy and Ron - had moved to other areas of New Jersey. Ron had settled at a house in Teaneck, New Jersey. After discussing their musical futures, it was eventually decided that the brothers would form their own record label. They settled on an abbreviated form of where Ron lived, naming the label T-Neck Records.

=== First releases ===
Following the label's formation, the Isleys decided to record a couple of compositions with their band, which included a then-unknown guitarist named Jimi Hendrix (who was going by Jimmy Hendrix or Jimmy James at the time). One of the label's first – and one of its only – releases at the time, was a gospel-influenced soul record titled "Testify", which was released as a single in 1964.

There were at least three versions of the song: the first version featured Hendrix's guitar work. This version is sought after and has been rarely heard due to its poor distribution. A second version was issued in two parts (much like "Shout" had been) and featured more vocalizing from the Isleys. This version was later issued on the Isleys' best-ofs, The Isley Brothers' Story, Vol. 1: Rockin' Soul (1959-1968) and It's Your Thing: The Story of the Isley Brothers in 1999. A third more abbreviated version was recorded in 1971 with the Isleys redoing their vocals with new lyrics by Ron Isley on a Hendrix tribute album, In the Beginning: The Isley Brothers and Jimi Hendrix, shortly after Hendrix's death in 1970.

After that record failed to chart, the brothers decided to have T-Neck distributed briefly by Atlantic Records, where the company released two more singles under the T-Neck name, featuring another Hendrix performance on the 1965 single, "Move Over and Let Me Dance", and the ballad "Wild as a Tiger", which did not include Hendrix. Both records, much like "Testify" before it, failed to chart. Following these failures and an offer to record for Motown by its CEO, Berry Gordy, the brothers decided to temporarily fold T-Neck. At Motown, they enjoyed success with the 1966 single "This Old Heart of Mine (Is Weak for You)". However, subsequent releases failed to chart and in 1968 the Isleys asked to be released from their contract, which was granted.

=== Reactivation and initial success ===
In early 1969, the brothers decided to reactivate the T-Neck label, which Ron Isley would later say was inspired by their stay at Motown due to the fact that Gordy, a black record executive, had virtually helped the label become a multi-million selling company. Ron was made president of the label while his brothers Kelly and Rudy were vice presidents with Kelly being the main leader behind the records' distribution deals. After seeking several labels, the brothers eventually signed a distribution deal with Neil Bogart's Buddah Records, which had agreed to oversee many of the label's releases. The Isleys then formed a new publishing company titled Triple Three Music, which would be their main publishing company for their works.

The label's first official release was the funk anthem, "It's Your Thing" (1969), which turned to be a huge success, peaking at #1 on the R&B singles chart as well as #2 on the pop chart, and selling over a million copies. A parent album, It's Our Thing (1969), peaked at #24 on the pop chart, marking it their first simultaneous success after years of being a mid-range successful act. The brothers signed other acts such as Judy White and Baby Cortez during that time and had the singers recording their own music. The brothers released two more albums in 1969 including the live release, Live at Yankee Stadium and The Brothers: Isley, which boasted their second top 40 hit, "I Turned You On". Other releases included Get Into Something (recorded in 1969 but released in 1970), The Isley Brothers Way (1970) by Dave "Baby" Cortez, Privilege by the act of the same name, and 1971's In the Beginning, the brothers' Jimi Hendrix tribute album.

Most of the Isley Brothers' records were backed by a team of musicians ranging from different areas including legendary rhythm guitarist Charles "Skip" Pitts who, following the recording of Get Into Something (1970), left the Isleys to back Isaac Hayes' band where he created the memorable guitar riff for Hayes' signature hit, "Shaft". It was Pitts that delivered the memorable guitar riff for "It's Your Thing". Contrary to popular belief, the future members of the group Marvin Isley and Rudy Isley's baby brother-in-law Chris Jasper didn't contribute to their recordings at the time as they were each attending college. Ernie Isley, who had joined his brothers' band as a drummer, played bass on a majority of their 1969-1970 recordings before switching over to electric guitar after he had been practicing the instrument for a while.

By 1971, the Isleys had changed much of their musical direction away from the boisterous funk styled from "It's Your Thing" into a more subdued form of funk with hard rock elements. The results were the albums, Givin' It Back (1971) and Brother, Brother, Brother (1972), both of which were notable for gospel and funk influenced interpretations of rock songs such as "Love the One You're With" and "It's Too Late", which resulted in chart success. In addition, the 1972 release of Brother, Brother, Brother would include three notable hit singles including the top 40 hits, "Pop That Thang" and "Work to Do". It was also the first official album to include Marvin Isley and Jasper on bass guitar and keyboards respectively. Following that release and another live album, The Isleys Live (1973), the brothers left Buddah after their contract ran out. Seeking a bigger label to distribute their releases, CBS president Clive Davis signed the act to the Epic subsidiary in 1973. Afterwards, Ernie Isley, brother Marvin and Jasper became the new official members of the band.

=== Major success ===
The Isleys released their first T-Neck/CBS release with the 3+3 album in 1973. The album boasted the hit singles "That Lady", "What It Comes Down To" and "Summer Breeze", the latter song becoming a top ten hit in the UK, their first top ten hit over there since their Motown releases including "This Old Heart" had reached the top ten. 3+3 was the group's first album to be certified platinum and was recorded with the same associate producers that had helped to make Stevie Wonder's recordings during this time become a success - Robert Margouleff and Malcolm Cecil. The brothers' 1974 album, Live It Up, went gold on the basis of the dance singles such as the title track and "Midnight Sky" while their ballad version of Todd Rundgren's "Hello It's Me" became an instant Isley Brothers favorite.

In 1975, the brothers reached their peak with the release of the album, The Heat Is On, which was notable for the brothers' sequencing of the sides of the album, with one side featuring uptempo funk numbers and the other showcasing more subtle, softer ballads. Much of its CBS records featured compositions by the younger Isley brothers and Jasper, with Ernie Isley serving duty as lyrical writer, musical composer and multi-instrumentalist, not only playing guitar during sessions but also drums and assorted percussive instruments. Marvin Isley and Jasper were also multi-tasking similar roles. This period of success continued into the late seventies with the releases of platinum-selling albums such as Harvest for the World (1976), Go for Your Guns (1977) and Showdown (1978).

Following this, the Isleys' period of success started tampering down with their double album, Winner Takes All (1979), managing to take gold. While their next two albums, Go All the Way (1980) and Grand Slam (1981), managed to go platinum and gold respectively, their next two albums, 1981's Inside You and 1982's The Real Deal became their first T-Neck releases since 1972 to not do so. Their 1983 release, Between the Sheets would become their last CBS recording and also their first in a while to go platinum, thanks to the success of the title track.

=== Financial struggles and decline ===
By 1982, the T-Neck label was undergoing financial troubles no thanks in part due to the three elder Isleys' spending habits and failure to pay back taxes after a certain period. During this time, the brothers had signed the R&B band, Bloodstone to their label where they produced what became the band's comeback album, We Go a Long Way Back (1982), with the title track providing them their biggest R&B success since 1975's "My Little Lady". However, Bloodstone's next T-Neck album Party (1984) failed to generate similar success.

Meanwhile, the decade-long 3+3 lineup was dealing with other issues including what later turned into a court battle against the two-halves of the act arguing over royalties and questionable songwriting credits (all of its CBS recordings were credited to all six members but were only issued on Triple Three Music and Three Boys Music giving the three older Isleys shares of the royalties). In 1983, the older Isleys advised the others to leave the band as they dealt with financial issues. Prior to this, the older Isleys managed to have most of Ernie's, Marvin's and Jasper's compositions recorded for Between the Sheets (1983).

By 1985, with severe financial problems, each of the brothers filed for Chapter 7 bankruptcy and T-Neck Records folded, giving up much of the label's assets to pay debts and to avoid imprisonment for tax evasion. Shortly afterwards, the group returned as a trio and signed a contract with Warner Bros Records where they recorded the album Masterpiece, released in 1985. Meanwhile, the younger brothers and Jasper had reformed as Isley-Jasper-Isley, recording for Columbia Records where they released the hit, "Caravan of Love" (1985). Ironically, the record was included in the track listing of the Isleys compilation, The Isley Brothers Story, Vol. 2: The T-Neck Years (1969-1985), despite the fact that the record was never issued on T-Neck Records.

Ron Isley and Ernie Isley are the only original members of the group - Kelly Isley died in 1986, shortly after T-Neck folded; Rudy Isley retired from the music industry in 1989 and later died in 2023. Chris Jasper left the group and went solo in 1987 and died in 2025. Some of the Isleys' songs recorded under T-Neck have been released on various labels, with permission from Sony Music. T-Neck's pre-1983 catalog is owned by Sony Music via Legacy Recordings.

== See also ==
- List of record labels
