= Ernie Isley =

American guitarist (born 1952)

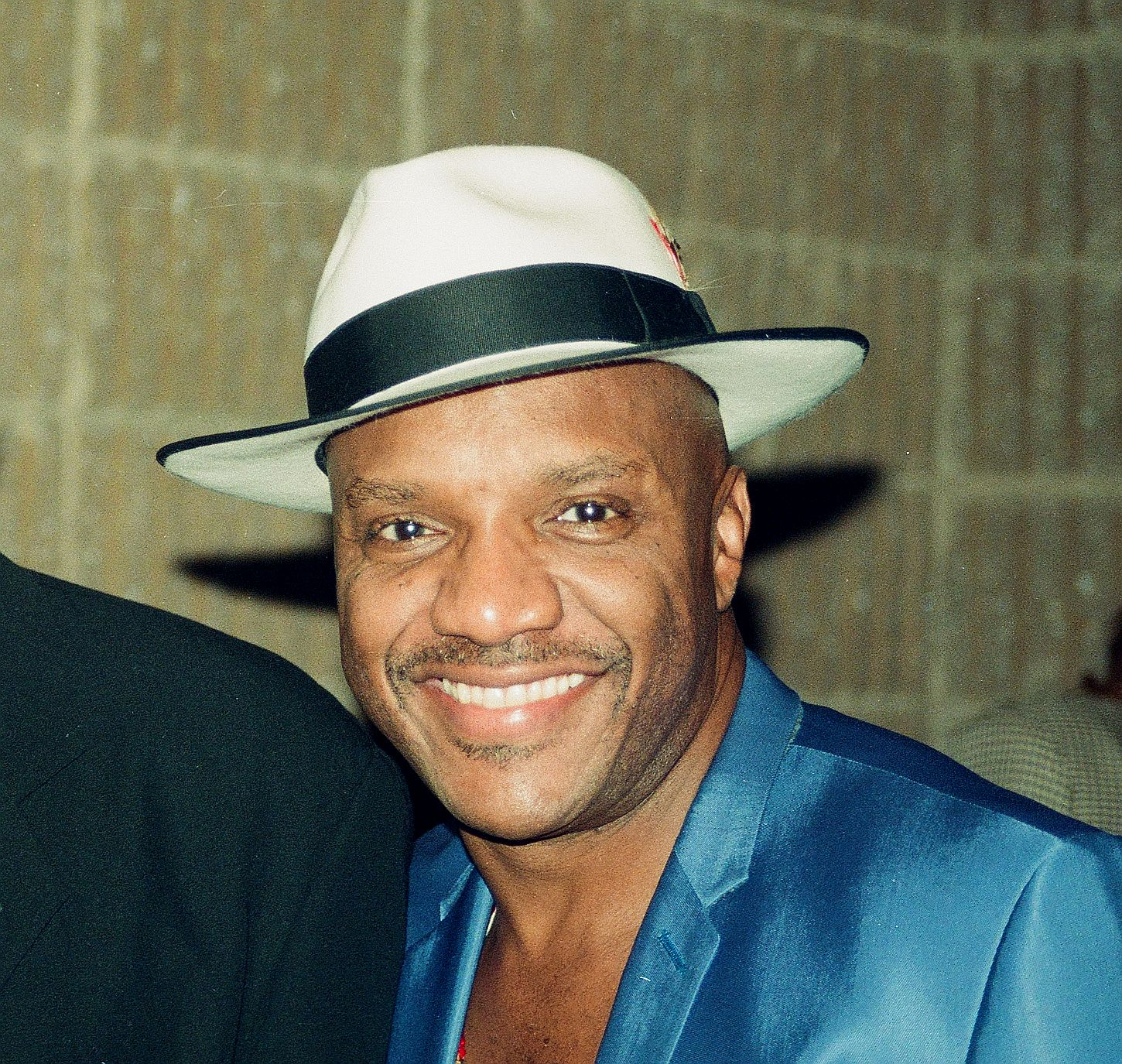
- Isley in 1996

Background information
- Born: Ernest Isley; March 7, 1952 (age 74); Cincinnati, Ohio, U.S.
- Genres: R&B; funk; rock; soul; hard rock
- Occupations: Musician, singer, songwriter
- Instruments: Guitar, drums, bass, vocals
- Years active: 1969–present
- Label
- Children: Alex Isley (daughter)

Ernest Isley (born March 7, 1952) is an American musician best known as a member of the musical ensemble The Isley Brothers, and also the splinter group Isley-Jasper-Isley.

== Biography ==
Ernie Isley was born in Cincinnati, Ohio, where his older brothers formed The Isley Brothers. In 1960, his family moved to Englewood and Teaneck, New Jersey, where he later attended Dwight Morrow High School. During this period, Jimi Hendrix (known as Jimmy) lived with the Isley family from the spring of 1963 through Thanksgiving of 1965. He holds a BA in Music from C.W. Post (Long Island University). He resides in St. Louis. Ernie started playing drums at 12. His first live gig as a member of his brothers' band was as a drummer in 1966 at the age of 14. Ernie was influenced by José Feliciano's version of "Light My Fire" and in 1968 got his first guitar. He is a self-taught musician. In 1968, he did his first professional recording, playing bass on the Isley Brothers' breakthrough funk smash "It's Your Thing", released in 1969. He played electric guitar, acoustic guitar, and drums on the group's early 1970s albums Get Into Something, Givin' It Back, and Brother, Brother, Brother, before fully joining the group in 1973, becoming a multi-instrumentalist playing acoustic guitar, electric guitar, drums and percussion.

Ernie is a prolific songwriter, penning, among others, "Fight the Power (Part 1 & 2)", "Between the Sheets", "Make Me Say It Again", "Harvest for the World", "Voyage to Atlantis", "(At Your Best) You Are Love", "Footsteps In the Dark", and "Brown Eyed Girl". He has also co-written, among others, "That Lady", "For The Love of You", and "Take Me To The Next Phase". His guitar riffs are recognizable on "Summer Breeze", "That Lady", "Voyage To Atlantis" and "Choosey Lover". In 1984, Ernie, Marvin and Chris formed the group Isley-Jasper-Isley, releasing three albums. In 1990, Ernie released his first solo album, High Wire. In the same year he recorded a cover version of The Cars' "Let's Go" for the compilation album Rubáiyát. In 1991, he rejoined Ronald and Marvin on tour and in the studio. In 1996 they released their platinum CD Mission to Please, and in 2001 "Eternal", the lyrics to the title track written by Ernie.

The Isley Brothers were inducted into the Rock and Roll Hall of Fame in 1992. In 2014, the Isley Brothers received the Grammy Lifetime Achievement Award. In 2010 and 2011, Ernie participated on the Experience Hendrix Tour. He is a musician on the Janet Jackson album Discipline, on the tracks "Never Letchu Go" and "The 1". He performed on the majority of the 2012 Joss Stone CD The Soul Sessions Vol. 2. Ernie and Ronald continue to work together on tour and in the studio. Ernie and Ronald teamed up with Carlos Santana, releasing the 13-track The Power of Peace in 2017. In 2022, the Isley Brothers teamed with Beyoncé to remake "Make Me Say It Again, Girl", originally released in 1975 and written by Ernie.

In 2020, Ernie was inducted into the Songwriters Hall of Fame as a member of the Isley Brothers, and is currently touring domestically and internationally with Ronald.

Fender Custom Shop has built for him three custom Zeal Stratocasters, using his personal design. Ernie is active as a musical mentor in schools and community music programs. He has been a returning guest lecturer at Berklee School of Music in Boston. He has been married to Tracy since 1998. He has one daughter, Alexandra Isley who is also a Grammy nominated R&B singer-songwriter. He was awarded an honorary doctorate of music by the Berklee College of Music on May 7, 2016.
