= Chris Jasper =

American singer, composer and producer (1951–2025)

- Born: Christopher Howard Jasper; December 30, 1951; Cincinnati, Ohio, U.S.
- Died: February 23, 2025 (aged 73)
- Genres: R&B; soul; jazz
- Occupations: Musician; composer; record producer
- Instruments: Keyboards; vocals
- Years active: 1969–2025
- Label: Gold City Records
- Formerly of: The Isley Brothers; Isley-Jasper-Isley
- Website: Official website

Christopher Howard Jasper (December 30, 1951 – February 23, 2025) was an American singer, composer and producer. Jasper was a member of the Isley Brothers from 1973 to 1983, and Isley-Jasper-Isley from 1984 to 1987. He was also a successful solo musician and record producer, recording over 17 of his own solo albums, including four urban contemporary gospel albums, all written, produced and performed, both vocally and instrumentally, by Jasper.

He also produced artists for his New York City-based record label, Gold City Records. Jasper's keyboard and Moog synthesizer work was his signature contribution to the Isley Brothers' music of the 1970s and 1980s when the Isley Brothers were a self-contained band.

== Early life and career ==
Jasper was born on December 30, 1951. He was a classically trained musician and composer. The youngest of seven siblings, he started studying classical music at the age of seven at the suggestion of his mother, Elizabeth. After graduating from high school in Cincinnati, he moved to New York to study music composition at the Juilliard School of Music in New York City. He continued his studies at C.W. Post, Long Island University, New York, where he studied with jazz pianist and composer Billy Taylor and received a Bachelor of Fine Arts Degree in music composition. He subsequently graduated from Concord University School of Law.

The Jasper and Isley families lived in the same apartment complex in Cincinnati. While still living in Cincinnati, Jasper's older sister, Elaine, married Rudolph Isley. His vocal trio formed by the three older brothers, Rudolph, Ronald and O'Kelly, subsequently relocated to Teaneck, New Jersey. While living in Teaneck as a young teenager and attending Teaneck High School, Jasper and the two younger Isleys, Marvin and Ernie, formed a band, "The Jazzman Trio" with Jasper on keyboards, Ernie on drums, and Marvin on bass.

The band played local gigs in the New Jersey area. Along with Jasper, Marvin and Ernie also attended C.W. Post College in New York. While still in college, Jasper, Ernie, and Marvin toured with the older Isley Brothers and played on the earlier recordings, including Ernie's bass guitar on "It's Your Thing". Jasper's first of many songs written for the Isley Brothers was "Love Put Me on a Corner" released on the Isleys' Brother, Brother, Brother album in 1972.

In 1973, Jasper, Marvin, and Ernie brought a new songwriting and musical component to the older Isley Brothers' vocal trio, transitioning the Isley Brothers into a self-produced, self-contained six-member R&B/Funk band. Their debut release during this time was the 3+3 album.

Jasper was a contributing songwriter, producer, and arranger to The Isley Brothers music from 1973 (3+3) through 1983 (Between the Sheets), adding to signature contributions by younger members Ernie and Marvin, and foundational contributions by Kelly, Rudolph and Ronald Isley. Between The Sheets, the title track written by Ernie, was their final album as a six-member group.

In 1984, the six-member group disbanded. Jasper, Marvin, and Ernie decided to remain with CBS and record as "Isley-Jasper-Isley" while the older Isley brothers departed the label and unsuccessfully sued the younger brothers and CBS Records in an attempt to prevent the younger brothers from recording for CBS.

Isley-Jasper-Isley was a self-contained, self-produced trio with Jasper as lead singer and continuing his contributing role as a songwriter, producer, and arranger. The trio released three albums on CBS Records. Jasper wrote and sang lead on the group's biggest hit, "Caravan of Love", which was covered by the British band the Housemartins, becoming a number one international hit.

In 1987, Isley-Jasper-Isley disbanded. In 1990, Ernie released a solo album on another label. In 1991, Marvin rejoined Ronald as The Isley Brothers, with Ernie following suit later the same year; following Marvin's retirement due to complications with diabetes in 1997, Ronald and Ernie have been the main performers carrying on the Isley Brothers name.

Jasper continued on as a solo artist and released two albums on his CBS-Associated label, Gold City Records, including the number one R&B hit "Superbad" in 1988, a song which emphasized the importance of education, a theme Jasper continued to emphasize in many of the songs he wrote after his days with the Isleys. In 1989, Jasper wrote, produced and performed on "Make It Last" for Chaka Khan's CK album. In all, Jasper released 16 solo albums, including four gospel albums.

Jasper's January 2013 release titled Inspired: By Love, By Life, By The Spirit was a compilation of love songs as well as socially conscious and spiritual tracks. In May 2014, he released The One, reminiscent of the soulful R&B and funk music he wrote for the Isleys.

In 2016, he released Share With Me with a cover of the Billy Preston hit, "You Are So Beautiful", and a track called "America", a tribute to the nation and a call to come together. In April 2018, Jasper pre-released a double-A single "The Love That You Give/It's a Miracle" from his 15th solo CD Dance With You. In 2019, Jasper released a "covers" album entitled "For The Love Of You" which included versions of some of the songs Jasper contributed to with The Isley Brothers, including the title track, as well as some well-known R&B and pop classics, including renditions of Sam Cooke's "Nothing Can Change This Love," Marvin Gaye's "God Is Love," and Van Morrison's "Have I Told You Lately."

Jasper continued to write, record, and perform all the music on his solo albums and produce artists for his Gold City label, including Liz Hogue, Out Front, and Brothaz By Choice. In 2015, in conjunction with Sony Music, Jasper released the Essential Chris Jasper, which encompasses all of the tracks that Jasper sang lead on during the Isley-Jasper-Isley years and his solo career at CBS/Sony Music.

Jasper's music with the Isley Brothers has been covered and sampled by many different artists. Jasper received numerous gold and platinum albums and music industry awards. Jasper, as a member of the Isley Brothers, and the Isleys were inducted into the Rock & Roll Hall of Fame in 1992.

In January 2014, Jasper, again as a member of the Isley Brothers, and the Isleys were honored with the Grammy Lifetime Achievement Award. In 2015, Jasper received the German Record Critics Lifetime Achievement Award.

In 2016, Jasper was awarded the National R&B Society Lifetime Achievement Award. In 2020, Jasper was awarded the Soultracks Lifetime Achievement Award. In 2022, Jasper, as a member of the Isley Brothers, was inducted into the Songwriters Hall of Fame.

== Personal life and death ==
Jasper lived in New York with his wife of 42 years, Margie Jasper, a New York-based attorney and author.

Jasper died on February 23, 2025, two months after being diagnosed with cancer. He was 73.

A heartfelt tribute to Jasper by his wife is on his Facebook page.

== Discography ==
=== Isley Brothers years ===
- 3+3 (CBS) 1973
- Live It Up (CBS) 1974
- The Heat Is On (CBS) 1975
- Harvest for the World (CBS) 1976
- Go for Your Guns (CBS) 1977
- Showdown (CBS) 1978
- Winner Takes All (CBS) 1979
- Go All the Way (CBS) 1980
- Grand Slam (CBS) 1981
- Inside You (CBS) 1981
- The Real Deal (CBS) 1982
- Between the Sheets (CBS) 1983

=== Isley-Jasper-Isley years ===
- Broadway's Closer to Sunset Blvd (CBS) 1984
- Caravan of Love (CBS) 1985
- Different Drummer (CBS) 1986

=== Solo career ===
- Superbad (Gold City/CBS Associated) 1988
- Time Bomb (Gold City/CBS Associated) 1989
- Praise the Eternal (Gold City) 1992
- Deep Inside (Gold City) 1994
- Faithful & True (Gold City) 2002
- The Best of Chris Jasper...With Love (2003)
- Amazing Love (Gold City) 2005
- Invincible (Gold City) 2007
- Everything I Do (Gold City) 2010
- Inspired...By Love, By Life, By The Spirit (Gold City) 2013
- The One (Gold City) (2014)
- Thank You Jesus (Gold City) (2015)
- The Essential Chris Jasper (Sony/Gold City) (2015)
- Share With Me (Gold City) (2016)
- Dance with You (Gold City) (2018)
- For The Love Of You (Gold City) (2020)
- Raise The Bar (Gold City) (2022)
- It Started With a Kiss (single) (Gold City) (2023)
- Auld Lang Syne (single) (Gold City) (2024)
- Be Number One (single) (Gold City) (2024)

=== Production credits ===
- Vicious & Fresh (Liz Hogue) (Gold City/CBS) (1989)
- Out Front (Out Front) (Gold City) (1995)
- Brotha 2 Brotha (Brothaz By Choice) (Gold City) (1998)
- "Make It Last" (on Chaka Khan's ck album) (WB) (1989)
- Addictive (Michael Jasper) (Gold City) (2010)
- Make It (Michael Jasper) (Gold City) (2016)
- Harvest for the World (Average White Band) (Average Enterprisess) (2017)

== See also ==
- List of Moog synthesizer players
- List of show business families
