= Rudolph Isley =

American singer-songwriter (1939–2023)

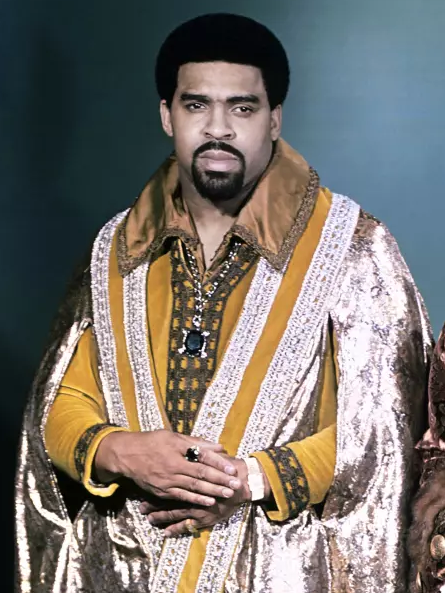
- Rudolph Isley in 1969

Background information
- Born: Rudolph Bernard Isley; April 1, 1939; Cincinnati, Ohio, U.S.
- Died: October 11, 2023 (aged 84) Olympia Fields, Illinois, U.S.
- Genres: Rhythm and blues, doo-wop, soul, gospel
- Years active: 1954–1989
- Formerly of: The Isley Brothers

Rudolph "Rudy" Bernard Isley (April 1, 1939 – October 11, 2023) was an American singer-songwriter and one of the founding members of The Isley Brothers.

== Life and career ==
Rudolph "Rudy" Bernard Isley was born on April 1, 1939, and raised in Cincinnati, Ohio, where he began singing in church at a young age. By his teen years, he was singing as member of The Isley Brothers with Kelly, Ronnie and Vernon. In 1957, following Vernon's death, the remaining three elder Isleys moved to New York to seek a recording deal, later recording for smaller labels until landing a deal with RCA Records in 1959 where they wrote, recorded and released their first significant recording, "Shout". By the summer of that year, the Isley family had moved from Cincinnati to a home in Englewood, New Jersey.

Following "Shout", the brothers recorded for other labels with modest success with exceptions including the top 40 hit, "Twist and Shout" and the Motown hit, "This Old Heart of Mine (Is Weak for You)". In the 1960s, Rudy and his brothers founded the T-Neck Records label to promote their recordings. Following their split with Motown, they reactivated the label and scored a Grammy-winning smash with "It's Your Thing" in 1969. While Ron Isley was the prominent lead singer of the group, Rudy did record a few lead vocals on some Isley Brothers songs, following the reactivation of T-Neck. After the group reorganized into a band after the inclusion of younger brothers Ernie and Marvin Isley and in-law Chris Jasper, Rudy was known for wearing hats and fur-attired clothing and was also known for carrying a cane. Rudy would share lead vocals with his brothers Ron and Kelly on hits such as "Fight the Power" and "Livin' in the Life". Rudy also sang full lead on other tunes such as "You Still Feel the Need" from the album, Harvest for the World, and their 1979 hit, "It's a Disco Night (Rock Don't Stop)". In 1986, Rudy's eldest brother Kelly suddenly died of a heart attack in his sleep. Kelly's death devastated Rudy as the brothers had been close. After recording the albums Smooth Sailin' and Spend the Night, Rudy Isley left the group and the music industry for good in 1989 to follow a lifelong goal of being a Christian minister. Rudy was inducted as member of the Isleys to the Rock and Roll Hall of Fame in 1992. Rudolph Isley Independently Released A Gospel Album in 1996 Called Shouting for Jesus: A Loud Joyful Noise.

== Personal life and death ==
Isley married Elaine Jasper in 1958. At first, Isley and his family settled at a house he bought in Teaneck, New Jersey, where they lived for ten years. By the mid-1970s, Isley was living in Haworth, New Jersey. He and his wife were long-term residents of Otisville, New York before moving to Olympia Fields near Chicago in 2013, buying R. Kelly's former house to be near their children and grandchildren.

Rudolph Isley died from an apparent heart attack at his home on October 11, 2023, at the age of 84.
