= O'Kelly Isley Jr. =

American musical artist (1937–1986)

O'Kelly Isley
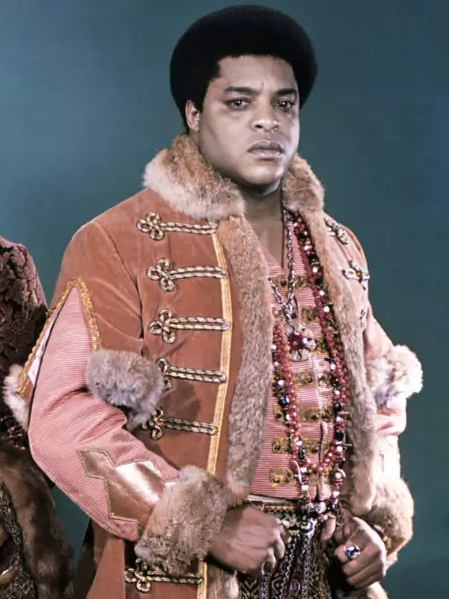
- O'Kelly Isley Jr. in 1969

Background information
- Born: O'Kelly Isley Jr. December 25, 1937; Cincinnati, Ohio, U.S.
- Origin: Teaneck, New Jersey, U.S.
- Died: March 31, 1986 (aged 48) Alpine, New Jersey, U.S.
- Genres: R&B; soul
- Occupation: Singer-songwriter
- Instrument: Vocals
- Years active: 1954–1986
- Formerly of: The Isley Brothers

O'Kelly "Kelly" Isley Jr. (December 25, 1937 – March 31, 1986) was an American singer and one of the founding members of the family group the Isley Brothers.

== Early life ==
The eldest of the Isley Brothers, Kelly started singing with his brothers at church. When he was 16, he and his three younger brothers (Rudolph, Ronald and Vernon) formed The Isley Brothers and toured the gospel circuit. Following the death of Vernon in a road accident, the brothers decided to try their hand at doo-wop and moved to New York to find a recording deal.

== Music career ==
Between 1957 and 1959, the Isleys would record for labels such as Teenage and Mark X. In 1959, they signed with RCA Records after a scout spotted the trio's energetic live performance.

O'Kelly and his brothers co-wrote their first significant hit, "Shout". While the original version only peaked at the top 50 of the Hot 100, subsequent versions helped the song sell over a million copies. Later moving on to other labels including Scepter and Motown, the brothers would have hits with "Twist & Shout" in 1962 and "This Old Heart of Mine (Is Weak for You)". In 1959, the Isley family had relocated to Englewood, New Jersey where Kelly stayed with his mother and younger siblings.

In 1969, the brothers left Motown and started their own label, T-Neck Records, where they would write the majority of their recordings, including "It's Your Thing". Kelly and his brother Rudy began to take some lead spots on the group's albums starting with the It's Our Thing album in 1969. The track, "Black Berries", from their The Brothers: Isley album, was dedicated to Kelly, who Ron would always quote him as saying "the blacker the berry, the sweeter the juice". That saying had been originated by Harlem Renaissance novelist Wallace Thurman in the 1929 novel, The Blacker the Berry. After the inclusion of younger brothers Ernie and Marvin and brother-in-law Chris Jasper, Kelly, Rudy and Ron didn't write as much as they did in the past but in an agreement shared parts of the composition credits as they owned the songs' publishing.

Kelly Isley during the Isleys' 1970s heyday was usually photographed wearing a cowboy hat and Western type of clothing. According to his brother Ernie, Ronald and Kelly needed a new guitarist and found Hendrix after hearing of his talents as a guitarist. After they helped Hendrix get his guitar out of the pawn shop and he played something for them, they hired him for their band and allowed him to live in their mother's house. In 1985, the brothers released the Masterpiece album. It is Kelly who sings most of the lead of the Phil Collins ballad, "If Leaving Me Is Easy", on the album with Ron backing him up. Kelly's last appearance as member of the Isley Brothers was in 1986 on the song "Good Hands" from the Wildcats soundtrack.

== Personal life ==
A heavyset man, O’Kelly lost weight, which was shown on the group's album cover of Masterpiece. On March 31, 1986, O'Kelly suddenly died of a heart attack at the age of 48 in his Alpine, New Jersey home leaving behind two sons, Frank and Doug. He is buried in George Washington Memorial Park in Paramus, New Jersey.

== Legacy ==
The Isley Brothers' follow-up record following Kelly's death, Smooth Sailin', was dedicated to him and featured their tribute song, "Send A Message". Kelly Isley was posthumously inducted into the Rock and Roll Hall of Fame as a member of the Isley Brothers in 1992.
