= Marvin Isley =

American musician (1953–2010)

- Born: August 18, 1953; Cincinnati, Ohio, US
- Died: June 6, 2010 (aged 56) Chicago, Illinois, US
- Genres: R&B, funk, soul, funk rock
- Occupations: Musician, instrumentalist, songwriter, arranger, composer, singer
- Instruments: Bass guitar, vocals
- Years active: 1971–1997
- Labels: Epic, T-Neck, Columbia, Warner Bros., Island Def Jam

Marvin Isley (August 18, 1953 – June 6, 2010) was an American musician best known as the youngest member of the family music group the Isley Brothers and its bass guitarist.

== Early life ==
Originally from Cincinnati, Ohio, Isley and his family moved to a home in Englewood, New Jersey in the summer of 1959. Isley eventually graduated from Englewood's Dwight Morrow High School in 1972. In 1976, he graduated from C.W. Post College with a degree in music.

== Career ==
Marvin began playing bass guitar while in high school and by the end of the decade was being tutored and mentored by his elder brothers alongside elder brother Ernie and their friend, Chris Jasper, who was an in-law. By 1971, Marvin began performing bass guitar on The Isley Brothers' album, Givin' It Back. Within two years, he became an official member of the group. In addition to playing bass, he also provided percussion and also wrote or co-wrote some of the group's hits including "Fight the Power", "The Pride" and "Between the Sheets". Breaking away from the Isleys in 1984, he, Ernie and Chris formed the trio, Isley-Jasper-Isley, who had a hit in 1985 with "Caravan of Love".

The group broke up in 1988 after Ernie Isley signed a solo recording deal. Three years later, Marvin and Ernie reunited with Ron Isley to reform the Isley Brothers. Marvin remained a member until complications from his longtime battle with diabetes forced him into retirement in 1997. Having been diagnosed with diabetes in his early 20s, Isley's condition worsened to the point where he had to have both legs amputated. Isley was inducted as a member of the Isley Brothers to the Rock and Roll Hall of Fame in 1992.

== Death ==
Marvin Isley died on June 6, 2010, from complications of diabetes at the Seasons Hospice within Weiss Memorial Hospital in Chicago, Illinois, at age 56. Marvin is interred in George Washington Memorial Park in Paramus, New Jersey. His niche is located 2 spots above singer/songwriter, Luther Vandross.
