= The Blacker the Berry =

The Blacker the Berry may refer to:

- The Blacker the Berry (novel), a 1929 novel by Wallace Thurman
- "The Blacker the Berry" (song), a 2015 song by Kendrick Lamar
- A line from the song "Run and Tell That" from the musical Hairspray
- A line from the song "Black" by Dave
- A line from the Fannie Flagg novel Fried Green Tomatoes at the Whistle Stop Cafe, which was likely referring to the Thurman novel.
- Pam Grier, as Foxy Brown, famously says in the 1974 film of the same name, "The darker the berry, the sweeter the juice, honey."
- "Keep Ya Head Up" (song), a 1993 song by Tupac Shakur.
- A line from the 1995 Comedy Film "Friday" by Ice Cube
