= Akeem Sule =

Nigerian-British psychiatrist

Akeem Sule is a British psychiatrist of Nigerian origin, co-founder of Hip-hop Psych with Dr Becky Inkster, an initiative that uses Hip-hop music and lyrics to support individuals experiencing mental health illness, and facilitator of the Association of Black Psychiatrists Culture Club.

== Selected publications ==
- Sule, Akeem; Inkster, Becky (1 December 2014). "A hip-hop state of mind". The Lancet Psychiatry. 1 (7): 494–495. doi:10.1016/S2215-0366(14)00063-7. ISSN 2215-0366. PMID 26361296. (Co-author)
- Sule, Akeem; Inkster, Becky (1 June 2015). "Kendrick Lamar, street poet of mental health". The Lancet Psychiatry. 2 (6): 496–497. doi:10.1016/S2215-0366(15)00216-3. ISSN 2215-0366. PMID 26360440. (Co-author)
- Sule, Akeem; Inkster, Becky (November 2021). "A public health perspective on hip-hop's response to the COVID-19 pandemic: Experiences of illness, spread of misinformation, and mobilization of resources". Public Health in Practice (Oxford, England). 2 100078. doi:10.1016/j.puhip.2021.100078. ISSN 2666-5352. PMC 8610780. PMID 34841371.
