= Josef Leimberg =

American jazz musician

- Born: November 29, 1972 (age 53); Los Angeles, California, United States
- Genres: Jazz; hip-hop
- Instruments: Drums; Trumpet; Saxophone
- Formerly of: Mad Kap

Josef Leimberg (born November 29, 1972) is a producer, lyricist, and trumpet player from Los Angeles. He contributed to Kendrick Lamar's Grammy Award-winning album, To Pimp a Butterfly and Snoop Dogg's album R&G (Rhythm & Gangsta): The Masterpiece, and is currently signed with World Galaxy, the jazz imprint of Alpha Pup Records.

== Career ==
Leimberg initially got his start in 1993 as a member of the group Mad Kap. They released one album on Loud Records, Look Ma Duke, No Hands, which featured the single "Proof Is In the Puddin'". For several years, he collaborated heavily with Myka 9 and Freestyle Fellowship, producing the bulk of their albums American Nightmare, Work in Progress, and Temptations. He played trumpet on The Shape Shifters / Project Blowed posse cut elegy for DJ Rob One, "Rob One, Rock On."

After being introduced to Snoop Dogg by producer Quazedelic, Leimberg produced numerous tracks on the rapper’s platinum albums R&G (Rhythm & Gangsta): The Masterpiece and Paid tha Cost to Be da Boss followed by extensive touring with Snoop Dogg as part of the band. Leimberg would then tour with singer Robin Thicke as a dominant force in his band’s horn section.

In 2014, Leimberg linked up with Terrace Martin under a new alias LoveDragon. The two would collaborate on Kendrick Lamar’s upcoming project, the Grammy Award-winning LP, To Pimp a Butterfly. On the album, Lovedragon contributed to the track "You Ain’t Gotta Lie (Mama Said)" as well as the track "How Much a Dollar Cost", which was President Barack Obama’s favorite song of 2015. and featured "neck-snapping drums, a somber piano melody and heavenly horn stabs". Leimberg's baritone vocals can also be found on "Wesley's Theory" and "For Sale?". "As a trumpeter, Leimberg’s work appears in six tracks on To Pimp a Butterfly: "For Sale?", "Wesley's Theory," "These Walls," "Complexion (A Zulu Love)," "You Ain't Gotta Lie (Momma Said)" and "Mortal Man."

In 2016, Leimberg released his first solo album Astral Progressions on World Galaxy, the jazz imprint of Alpha Pup Records, an independent label co-founded by Daddy Kev of Low End Theory. The album is a blend of jazz, ballads, hip-hop, funk, and meditation.

National Public Radio member station KCRW presented a guest mix from Leimberg and also included his album Astral Progressions on "KCRW’s Best of 2016."

Leimberg's music has also been featured on Hypebeast, The Boombox of Townsquare Media, Music Is My Sanctuary, Soulbounce, and DJBooth.

== Collaborations ==
Leimberg has recorded with numerous well-known artists and musicians, including Kendrick Lamar, Erykah Badu, Om’Mas Keith, Chance the Rapper, Bilal, Zap Mama, Robert Glasper, Thundercat, Nate Dogg, Angie Stone, Miguel, Sa-Ra, Maliah Franklin, Miguel Atwood-Ferguson, Suga Free, Terrace Martin, SZA, Tha Eastsidaz, Frank Ocean, George Clinton, Lyn Collins, Madlib, Iman Omari, Jimetta Rose, Shafiq Husayn, Snoop Dogg, and Xzibit., Cosmos Dwellerz Arkestra/Sanifu Al Hall Jr.Project 43 album

== Discography ==
=== Albums ===
Title	Details
Look Ma Duke, No Hands (with Mad Kap)	Release date: March 9, 1993; Label: Loud Records
Astral Progressions	Release date: October 7, 2016; Label: World Galaxy Records

== Reviews ==
=== Astral Progressions ===
The album takes influence from ’70s jazz fusion, world music, R&B and hip-hop. Astral Progressions has been described by the Wall Street Journal as "stellar jazz-funk… heavy on virtuosic jazz solos…". According to the Los Angeles Times, "Leimberg blasts into a decidedly cosmic realm...It’s a trippy record, thick with reverb, echo, layers of voices and a free-floating spirit that celebrates sonic spontaneity".
