= That Lady (song) =

1964 single by The Isley Brothers

"Who's That Lady"
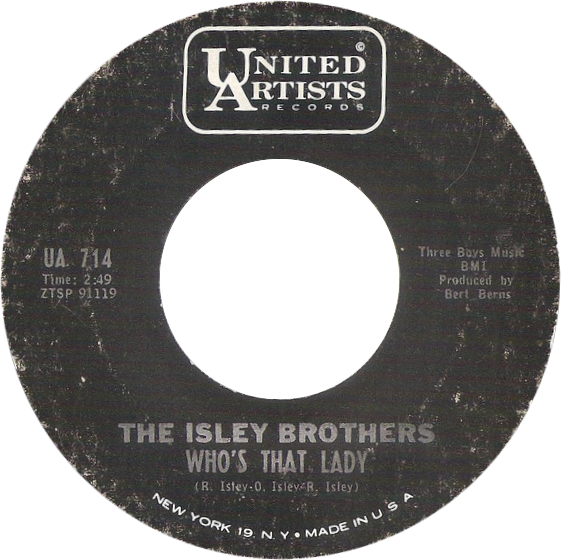
- US single of the original 1964 recording

Single by the Isley Brothers
- B-side: "My Little Girl"
- Released: April 1964
- Recorded: January 14, 1964
- Studio: Bell Sound Studios, New York City, New York
- Genre: R&B
- Length: 2:48
- Label: United Artists; 714
- Songwriters: Rudolph Isley; Ronald Isley; O'Kelly Isley Jr.
- Producer: Bert Berns

"That Lady, Pts. 1 & 2"
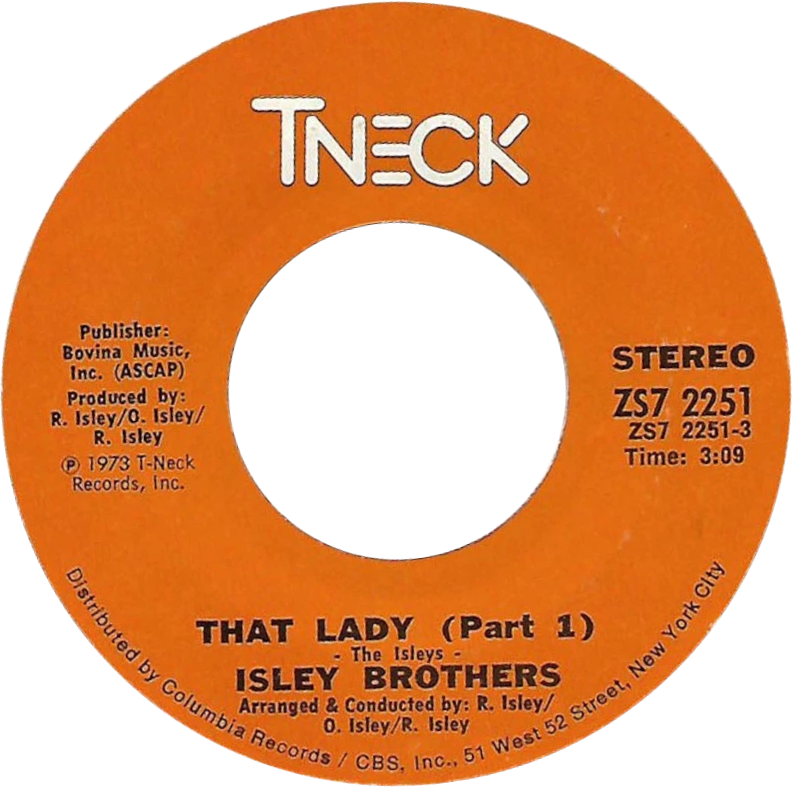
- US single of the 1973 rework

Single by the Isley Brothers

from the album 3 + 3
- Released: July 1973
- Recorded: 1973
- Studio: Record Plant, Los Angeles
- Genre: Funk rock; psychedelic funk; R&B
- Length: 5:34 (Album version); 3:09 (Radio version)
- Label: T-Neck; 2251
- Songwriters: Rudolph Isley; Ronald Isley; O'Kelly Isley Jr. Ernie Isley; Marvin Isley; Chris Jasper
- Producers: Ronald Isley; Rudolph Isley

The Isley Brothers singles chronology
"It's Too Late" (1973)	"That Lady, Pts. 1 & 2" (1973)	"What It Comes Down To" (1973)

Music video
- "That Lady, Pts. 1 & 2" on YouTube

"That Lady" is a song by the Isley Brothers, made famous in 1973 when it was reworked in a funk rock style. It was originally performed as "Who's That Lady?" in a classic R&B vocal style by the Isley Brothers in 1964, inspired by the Impressions.

In 1973, the core Isley Brothers vocal trio had recently expanded, picking up guitarist Ernie Isley, bassist Marvin Isley and keyboardist Chris Jasper to form their 3 + 3 configuration. Guitarist Jimi Hendrix had supported the Isley Brothers on tour in the mid-1960s, and Ernie Isley had been strongly influenced by Hendrix's playing methods. At the Los Angeles Record Plant in 1973 recording the new version of "That Lady", Ernie laid down a searing guitar line with heavy Hendrix-style sustain carrying a soft fuzz distortion. The recording project included other musicians on organ and congas to establish a funk/rock fusion sound. The song debuted at No.89 on the Hot 100 on July 14, 1973, as "Meet The Lady", then the title would appear as "Meet That Lady" for the next six weeks and "That Lady" for the remainder of the run.

"That Lady" became the Isley Brothers' first Top 10 pop single since 1969's "It's Your Thing", spending three weeks at No.6 on the pop chart and reaching No.2 on the US R&B Singles chart. The RIAA certified the single Gold in October 1973. It was also a cross-Atlantic hit for the group, reaching No.14 in the UK. With its prominent electric guitar line, "That Lady" helped establish Ernie Isley as a powerhouse performer.

In 2003, the song was ranked No.357 on Rolling Stone's list of the 500 Greatest Songs of All Time.

== Covers and samples ==
"That Lady" is sampled in "A Year and a Day," a section in the "B-Boy Bouillabaisse" suite on the 1989 Beastie Boys album Paul's Boutique.

Hip-hop versions of the song include "Who's That Lady" by The Get Funky Crew from their 1989 album Shake Them and "Who's That Lady" by Houston rapper 380 Dat Lady on her 1996 album A Day in the Life of 380 Vol. 1. "That Lady" is sampled in "Jus 1 Kiss (The Isley Bootleg)" by Basement Jaxx, which was released in 2001 and appeared on their 2005 greatest hits compilation The Singles.

Re-recorded elements of "That Lady" are incorporated in "i", the lead single of Kendrick Lamar's 2015 album To Pimp a Butterfly. The song won the awards for Best Rap Performance and Best Rap Song at the 2015 Grammy Awards.

Santana covers this track on their 1990 album Spirits Dancing in the Flesh.

== In popular culture ==
In the late 1990s, the song was used in a series of commercials for Salon Selectives haircare products.

"That Lady" appears in the 2004 film Anchorman: The Legend of Ron Burgundy, introducing Christina Applegate's character, the news anchor Veronica Corningstone, when she first arrives at the San Diego television station KVWN Channel 4.

== Chart history ==
=== Weekly charts ===
Chart (1973)	Peak position
Canada RPM Top Singles	20
Netherlands	20
UK Singles (OCC)	14
U.S. Billboard Hot 100	6
U.S. Billboard R&B	2
U.S. Cash Box Top 100	6

=== Year-end charts ===
Chart (1973)	Rank
Canada	164
U.S. Billboard Hot 100	21
U.S. Cash Box	24

== Personnel ==
- Ronald Isley – lead and backing vocals
- Rudolph Isley – backing vocals
- O'Kelly Isley Jr. – backing vocals
- Ernie Isley – guitar, backing vocals
- Marvin Isley – bass guitar, backing vocals
- Chris Jasper – piano, backing vocals
- George Moreland – drums
- Truman Thomas – organ
- Rocky – congas
