= For Free? (Interlude) =

Song by Kendrick Lamar

from the album To Pimp a Butterfly
- Released: March 15, 2015
- Genre: Jazz rap; spoken word
- Length: 2:10
- Label: Top Dawg; Aftermath; Interscope
- Songwriters: Kendrick Duckworth; Terrace Martin; Rose McKinney
- Producer: Terrace Martin

Music video
- "For Free?" on YouTube

"For Free? (Interlude)" is a song by American rapper Kendrick Lamar. It is the second track on his third studio album To Pimp a Butterfly, released on March 15, 2015. It features uptempo hard bop instrumentals, with Lamar rapping over them. A music video for the song was uploaded to Vevo and YouTube on July 31, 2015.

== Music video ==
The song's accompanying music video premiered on July 31, 2015 on Lamar's Vevo account. It starts with a woman (Darlene Tibbs) voicing the introductory spoken word section while actress/model Hikeah Kareem appears as the woman in the video lip-syncing the section. She rants off a long list of complaints about her "unfortunate" partner/pimp, played by Lamar before he appears - face pressed to a screen door - and proceeds to chase her around the estate while rapping and yelling, “This dick ain’t free!” Then, Lamar appears again from behind a window with a live band and pops his head into the bathroom. In the Joe Weil & The Little Homies-directed clip, Lamar takes a number of forms terrorizing his partner. The visual metaphors aligns with those of the song's lyrics, both asserting his own self-worth to a woman and to the marginalizing temptations of "success" in America.

== Charts ==
| Chart (2015) | Peak position |
|---|---|
| UK Singles (Official Charts) | 133 |
| UK Hip Hop/R&B (Official Charts) | 24 |
| US Bubbling Under Hot 100 (Billboard) | 24 |
| US Hot R&B/Hip-Hop Songs (Billboard) | 44 |

== Credits ==
- Kendrick Lamar – vocals
- Robert Sput Searight – drums
- Robert Glasper – piano
- Brandon Owens – bass
- Craig Brockman – organ
- Marlon Williams – guitar
- Terrace Martin – alto saxophone, production
- Anna Wise – background vocals
- Darlene Tibbs – background vocals
