= 3 + 3 =

Studio album by the Isley Brothers
- Released: August 7, 1973
- Recorded: 1973
- Studio: The Record Plant, Los Angeles
- Genre: Psychedelic soul; progressive soul; funk; rock
- Length: 38:55
- Label: T-Neck/Epic
- Producer: Ronald Isley, Rudolph Isley, O'Kelly Isley Jr.

The Isley Brothers chronology
Isleys' Greatest Hits (1973)	3 + 3 (1973)	Live It Up (1974)

Professional ratings
Review scores
Source	Rating
AllMusic	5/5 stars
Christgau's Record Guide	B+
Pitchfork	9.1/10

3 + 3 is the eleventh album released by the Isley Brothers for the Epic label under their T-Neck imprint on August 7, 1973. In 2020, the album was ranked at 464 on Rolling Stone's 500 Greatest Albums of All Time list.

== Background ==
The Isley Brothers first album for the label after several years on Buddah Records, it was also the first time the family group, which had consisted of founding members O'Kelly Isley, Jr., Rudolph Isley and Ronald Isley, officially included six members instead of the standard three. Following the recording and release of Brother, Brother, Brother (1972) the previous year, this was the first album to officially include younger brothers Ernie and Marvin and in-law Chris Jasper, even though all three had played on the previous several albums.

The success of the album is attributed to their first Top 10 pop record since "It's Your Thing" (1969), with their own cover of the self-penned "Who's That Lady", now re-titled "That Lady, Pt. 1 & 2". Other hit singles included the top five R&B single "What It Comes Down To", and their cover of Seals & Crofts' folk hit "Summer Breeze" (1972), which was also a top ten R&B single. The album became their first platinum album.

In addition to a stereo record release, this album was mixed in quadraphonic and released in 1974 on SQ record: T-NECK PZQ – 32453. It was also released on Super Audio CD on December 4, 2001.

The album was remastered and expanded for inclusion in the 2015 23-CD box set The RCA Victor & T-Neck Album Masters (1959–1983).

== Reception ==
The album was included in the book 1001 Albums You Must Hear Before You Die and is listed number 992 in All-Time Top 1000 Albums (3rd. edition, 2000). In 2020, the album was ranked at 464 on Rolling Stone's 500 Greatest Albums of All Time list.

== Track listing ==
Unless otherwise noted, Information taken from AllMusic and based on album liner notes.

All tracks are written by The Isley Brothers, except where noted.

Side one
No.	Title	Writer(s)	Length
1.	"That Lady"		5:35
2.	"Don't Let Me Be Lonely Tonight"	James Taylor	4:00
3.	"If You Were There"		3:22
4.	"You Walk Your Way"		3:08
5.	"Listen to the Music"	Tom Johnston	4:07

Side two
No.	Title	Writer(s)	Length
6.	"What It Comes Down To"		3:54
7.	"Sunshine (Go Away Today)"	Jonathan Edwards	4:23
8.	"Summer Breeze"	Jim Seals, Dash Crofts	6:12
9.	"The Highways of My Life"		4:17

2003 reissue bonus track
No.	Title	Length
10.	"That Lady" (Recorded Live)	4:15

== Personnel ==
=== The Isley Brothers ===
- Ronald Isley – lead vocals, background vocals
- Rudolph Isley – background vocals
- O'Kelly Isley Jr. – background vocals
- Ernie Isley – background vocals (1, 6, 8), maracas (6), tom-toms (6), acoustic guitar, electric guitar, 12-string guitar
- Marvin Isley – background vocals (1, 6, 8), bass guitar
- Chris Jasper – background vocals (1, 6, 8), Hohner clavinet (3, 5–7), Moog synthesizer (8–9), ARP synthesizer, acoustic piano, electric piano, tambourine

=== Guest musicians ===
- George Moreland – drums, tom-toms (6)
- Truman Thomas – organ (1, 3–6)
- Rocky – congas (1)

=== Production and design ===
- Produced by Ronald Isley, Rudolph Isley & O'Kelly Isley Jr.
- Malcolm Cecil, Robert Margouleff – recording engineers
- Ed Lee – cover design
- Don Hunstein – photography

== Charts ==
=== Weekly charts ===
Year	Chart	Peak position
1973	US Billboard Black Albums	2
1973	US Billboard Pop Albums	8

=== Singles ===
Year	Single	Peak position	
Year	Single	US Billboard Black Singles Chart	US Billboard Pop Singles Chart
1973	"That Lady (Part 1)"	2	6
1973	"What It Comes Down To"	5	55
1974	"Summer Breeze (Part 1)"	10	60
