= The Highways of My Life =

Single by The Isley Brothers

from the album 3 + 3
- A-side: "What It Comes Down To"
- Released: 1974
- Recorded: 1973
- Studio: The Record Plant
- Venue: Los Angeles, California
- Genre: Soul
- Length: 4:20
- Label: T-Neck
- Songwriter(s): O'Kelly Isley, Jr.; Rudolph Isley; Ronald Isley; Ernie Isley; Marvin Isley; Chris Jasper
- Producer(s): The Isley Brothers

"The Highways of My Life" is a song by The Isley Brothers. It was released in 1974 as a single from their album 3 + 3.

The song was released as the b-side of "What It Comes Down To", though the song eventually became a Top 40 hit in the UK, peaking at No. 25.

== About the song ==
The song is about a person wanting to search through the journey of his livelihood while being sure not to go "to the other side of the road". The song is notable for its distinctive intro arranged by Chris Jasper, who plays the piano in the intro of the song before the vocals start.

== Credits ==
- Ronald Isley: lead and background vocals
- Rudolph Isley and O'Kelly Isley, Jr.: background vocals
- Chris Jasper: keyboards, piano and synthesizers
- Ernie Isley: acoustic guitar and drums
- Marvin Isley: bass guitar

== Chart performance ==
Chart (1974)	Peak position
UK Singles	25
