= I (Kendrick Lamar song) =

Single by Kendrick Lamar

from the album To Pimp a Butterfly
- Released: September 23, 2014
- Recorded: Late 2013–14
- Genre: Hip-hop; R&B; neo soul; funk; black gospel; progressive soul
- Length: 3:51 (single version); 5:36 (album version)
- Label: TDE; Aftermath; Interscope
- Songwriters: Kendrick Duckworth; Marvin Isley; O'Kelly Isley; Ronald Isley; Rudolph Isley; Ernie Isley; Christopher Jasper; Columbus Smith
- Producer: Rahki

Kendrick Lamar singles chronology
"It's On Again" (2014)	"I" (2014)	"Never Catch Me" (2014)

Music video
- "I" on YouTube

"I" (stylized in lowercase or as "𝖎") is a song by American rapper Kendrick Lamar. It was released on September 23, 2014, as the lead single from Lamar's third studio album To Pimp a Butterfly (2015). The song uses music from "That Lady", written by and originally performed by R&B group the Isley Brothers, elements from which were re-recorded with Ronald Isley rather than being directly sampled from the original record. It won two awards at the 2015 Grammy Awards: Best Rap Performance and Best Rap Song.

== Background ==
"I" was produced by Los Angeles producer Rahki, who also produced the song "Institutionalized". Although the version of "I" that appears on the album is drastically different from the single release, both versions contain a sample of the song "That Lady" by The Isley Brothers. Lamar personally visited Isley Brothers' lead vocalist Ronald Isley to ask his permission to sample the song: "I actually had to go to St. Louis and get the blessings from Ronald Isley," he said. "That was a trip. We got in the studio and just vibed and talked about how things were back then and how they are now, and you can actually hear him on the record with a few ad-libs that he actually did. We got it on camera and things like that, it’s a beautiful thing." Isley also performs on the song "How Much a Dollar Cost" with singer-songwriter James Fauntleroy.

The single cover for "I" features members of gangs the Bloods and the Crips forming a heart. On the subject of the cover art Lamar said in an interview with AMP Radio: "Where I'm from, there's a lot of gang culture and things like that, so instead of throwing on up gang signs, which we used to, I put a Blood and I put a Crip together and we’re throwing up hearts...sparking the idea of some type of change through music or through me because I go back to the city now and people give me the honor and respect that, you know, this kid can change a little bit something different that’s been going on in the community."

The song's title has a significant connotation. In Hip Hop America, journalist Nelson George writes, "'I' is a powerful word in the vocabulary of the African American male," as it can be related to pride. While pride is one of the seven deadly sins, George's study explains how "this has been an invigorating source of self-empowerment," similar to the self-love Lamar preaches in his song.

== Composition ==
The version of "I" featured on To Pimp a Butterfly includes a "live-sounding mix" followed by a monologue from Lamar, departing from the "sunny soul" sound of the original single version.

== Music video ==
The video for the song premiered on Vevo and YouTube on November 4, 2014. It features cameos from singer Ron Isley and George Clinton. References are made to Tupac and The Joker in the video. A short instrumental was played in the intro of the clip. The video is directed by Alexandre Moors.

== Critical reception and awards ==
"I" received critical acclaim from music critics. The track was placed at number ten on Rolling Stone's 50 Best Songs of 2014 list. Billboard listed "I" as the second best song of 2014. "I" also was placed at number 14 on Spin's list of "The 101 Best Songs of 2014". In January 2015, "I" was ranked at number five on The Village Voice's annual year-end Pazz & Jop critics' poll.

"I" was nominated for Outstanding Music Video and Outstanding Song at the 46th NAACP Image Award. The song received two nominations at the 57th Annual Grammy Awards and won both Best Rap Performance and Best Rap Song.

== Chart performance ==
The song debuted and peaked at number 39 on the Billboard Hot 100, making it his fourth top 40 hit in the US. It was his highest-charting song to-date in the UK, Canada, and Australia, and was his first song to chart in New Zealand.

== Usage in popular culture ==
The song has been used in film trailers for Top Five, Dope, How to Be Single, The Intern, and Roman J. Israel, Esq. In 2014, it was the official song for the NBA. It is featured in soundtrack for the 2018 video game Forza Horizon 4 and is featured as a playable track in Fortnite Festival. In 2025, the song was featured in the end-credits of Captain America: Brave New World.

== Track listing ==
- Digital download
1. "I" – 3:51

== Charts ==
=== Weekly charts ===
Chart (2014)	Peak position
Australia (ARIA)	48
Belgium (Ultratip Bubbling Under Flanders)	22
Belgium Urban (Ultratop Flanders)	24
Canada Hot 100 (Billboard)	61
Denmark (Tracklisten)	36
France (SNEP)	68
Netherlands (Single Top 100)	82
New Zealand (Recorded Music NZ)	31
Scottish Singles Sales (Official Charts)	20
UK Singles (Official Charts)	20
UK Hip Hop/R&B (Official Charts)	3
US Billboard Hot 100	39
US Hot R&B/Hip-Hop Songs (Billboard)	11
US Pop Airplay (Billboard)	31
US Rhythmic Airplay (Billboard)	4

=== Year-end charts ===
Chart (2014)	Position
Australia Urban (ARIA)	42
US Hot R&B/Hip-Hop Songs (Billboard)	65

== Certifications ==
Region	Certification	Certified units/sales
Australia (ARIA)	2× Platinum	140,000^{‡}
Canada (Music Canada)	Platinum	80,000^{‡}
Denmark (IFPI Danmark)	Gold	45,000^{‡}
United Kingdom (BPI)	Gold	400,000^{‡}
United States (RIAA)	Platinum	1,000,000^{‡}
^{‡} Sales+streaming figures based on certification alone.

== Release history ==
Release dates and formats for "I"
Region	Date	Format	Label(s)	Ref.
United States	October 14, 2014	Mainstream airplay	Interscope	
