= The Blacker the Berry (song) =

2015 single by Kendrick Lamar

Single by Kendrick Lamar

from the album To Pimp a Butterfly
- Released: February 9, 2015
- Genre: Political hip-hop; boom bap
- Length: 5:28
- Label: TDE; Aftermath; Interscope
- Songwriters: Kendrick Duckworth; Matthew Samuels; Stephen Kozmeniuk; Ken Lewis; Brent Kolatalo; Jeffrey Campbell; Alexander Izquierdo; Zale Epstein
- Producers: Boi-1da; KOZ; Terrace Martin

Kendrick Lamar singles chronology
"Never Catch Me" (2014)	"The Blacker the Berry" (2015)	"King Kunta" (2015)

"The Blacker the Berry" is a song by American rapper Kendrick Lamar. It was included as the thirteenth track from his third studio album To Pimp a Butterfly (2015). "The Blacker the Berry" was released as the second single from the album on February 9, 2015. The track shares its title with American author Wallace Thurman's novel The Blacker the Berry (1929) and a lyric from Tupac Shakur's "Keep Ya Head Up". "The Blacker the Berry" was produced by Boi-1da, Terrace Martin, and KOZ, as well as containing a chorus that features uncredited vocals from Jamaican artist Assassin and additional vocals provided by singer Lalah Hathaway.

The track was released following Lamar's public backlash for his comments on the killing of Michael Brown and the subsequent Ferguson unrest months prior. A political hip-hop and boom bap track, Lamar opens "The Blacker the Berry" by calling himself a hypocrite, celebrating his African-American heritage while exploring themes of racism and hatred in a mix of anger and vulnerability. The track concludes with a jazz section to provide its sense of resolution, provided by musicians Robert Glasper, Hathaway, Thundercat, and Anna Wise.

"The Blacker the Berry" received rave reviews from contemporary music critics for its cinematic production, social commentary, and confrontational lyrics. The track also received a response from author Michael Chabon on the track's Genius page, comparing it to Common's "I Used to Love H.E.R." (1994) by explaining its wide representation of the Black community. However, it also elicited controversy due to Lamar's commentary on the death of Trayvon Martin, in which Lamar responded that the track was autobiographical.

Upon its release, "The Blacker the Berry" charted on the Billboard Hot 100 along with the Hot R&B/Hip-Hop Songs chart. The single has since been certified Gold by the Recording Industry Association of America (RIAA). While charting on UK Singles, it achieved greater success by peaking at number 20 on its Hip Hop/R&B Singles charts. The track also charted on two charts in Belgium. Lamar performed "The Blacker the Berry" at Hot 97's Summer Jam in 2015, the 58th Grammy Awards in 2016, and the Glastonsbury Festival in 2022.

== Background ==
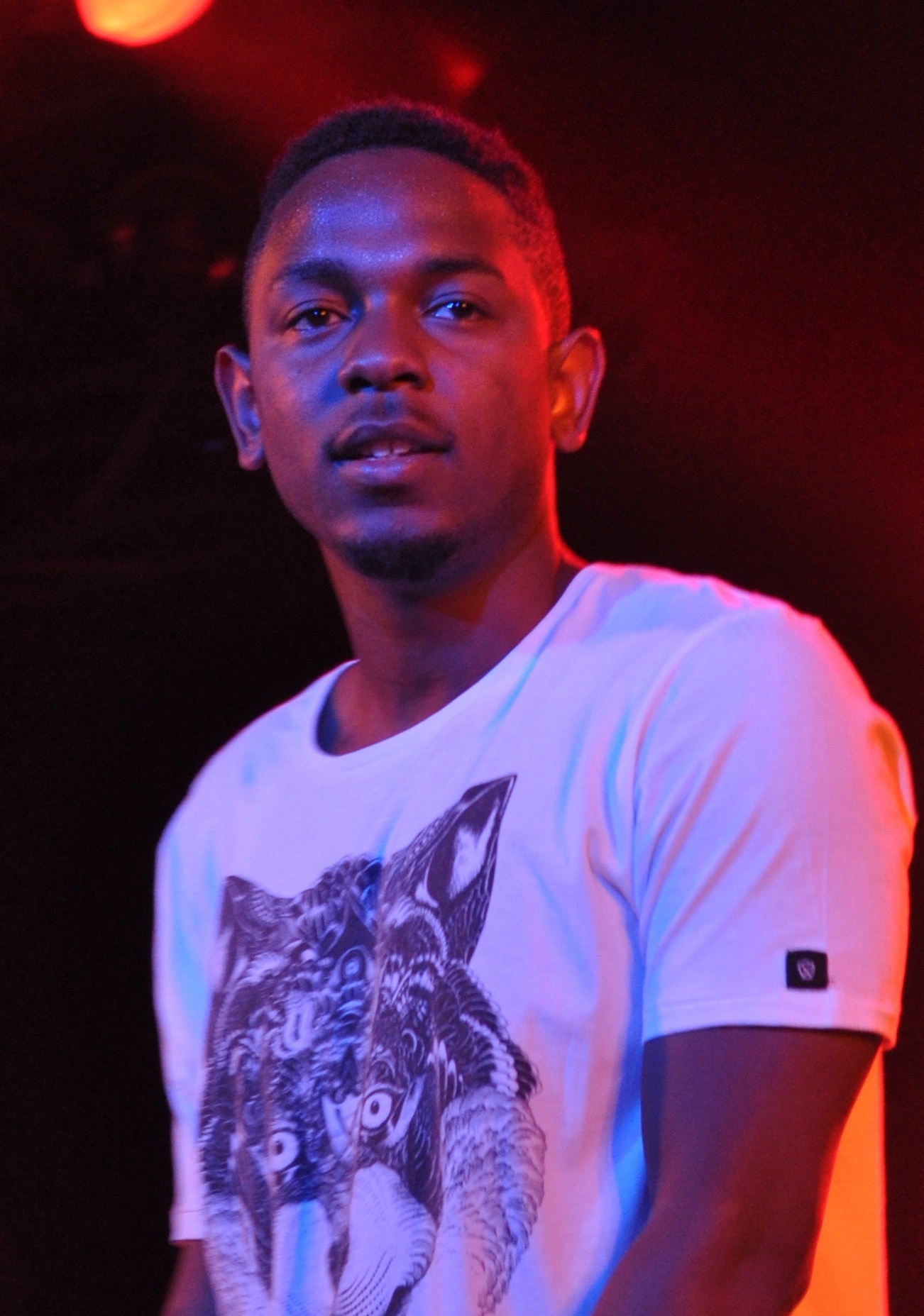
Lamar performing in 2013

On February 28, 2014, Kendrick Lamar announced a follow-up to his second studio album, Good Kid, M.A.A.D City (2012), during an interview with Billboard. During its development, Lamar traveled to South Africa. Touring the country and visiting historic sites such as Nelson Mandela's jail cell on Robben Island heavily influenced the direction of the record, which led to Lamar scrapping "two or three albums worth of material", evolving into To Pimp a Butterfly (2015). On September 17, Lamar posted artwork for the album's lead single, "I", which was later released six days later. The track received critical acclaim from music critics, crediting the track's "optimistic, sunny-side-up" themes and jazz influence. On February 8, 2015, Lamar won Best Rap Song and Best Rap Performance for "I" at the 57th Annual Grammy Awards.

"The Blacker the Berry" has been interpreted as Lamar's response to criticism following his remarks about the killing of Michael Brown and the subsequent Ferguson unrest, reflecting the views he expressed regarding Brown's death. In a Billboard interview, when asked if he was ever mistreated in encounters with police, Lamar replied, "plenty of times. All the time." When questioned about the highly publicized killings of African-Americans by police officers in 2014, he stated that "it starts from within. Don't start with just a rally, don't start from looting -- it starts from within." Lamar received public backlash for these statements from audiences, journalists, and fellow musicians, including Azealia Banks, who criticized his perspective as misguided.

== Production ==
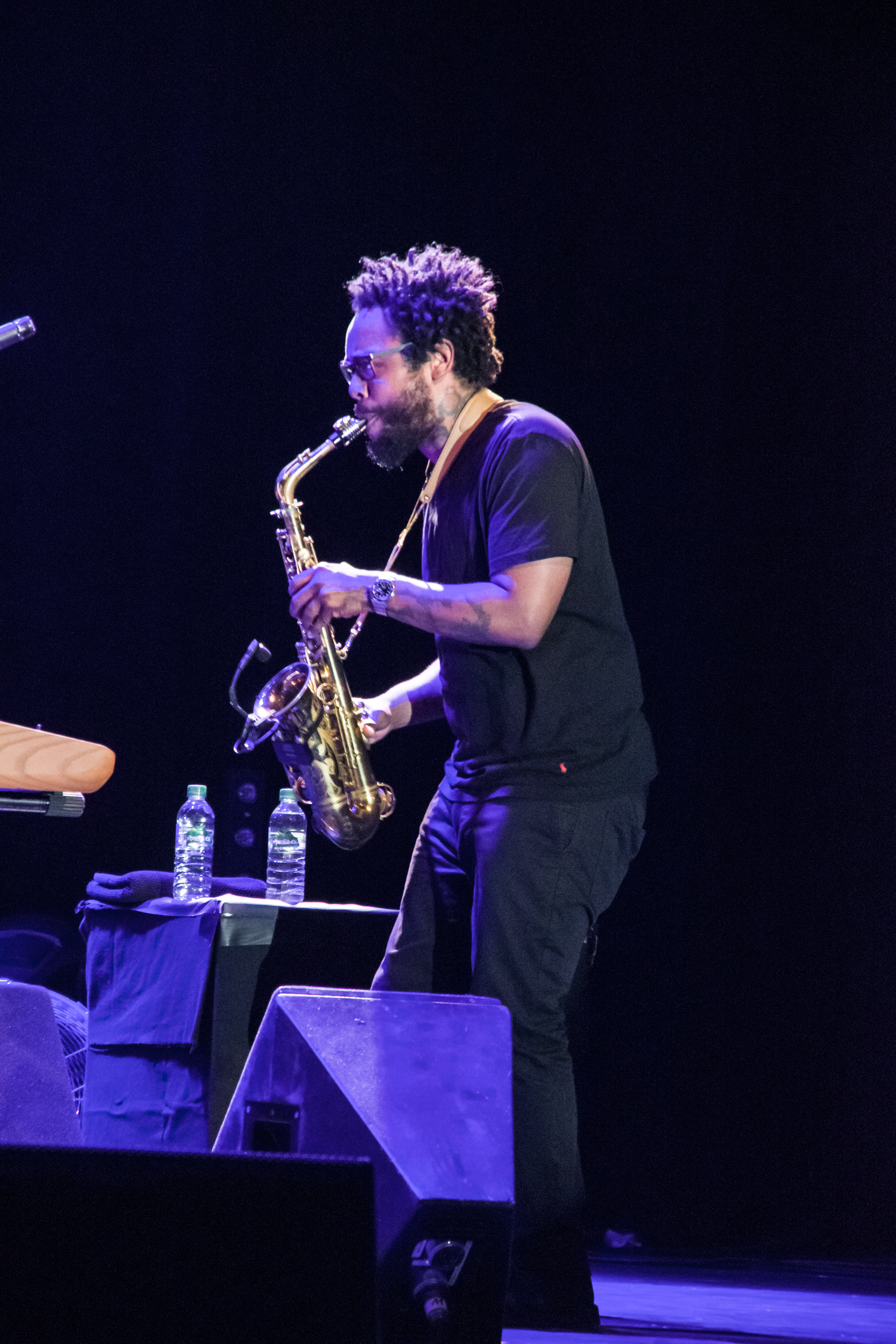
Terrace Martin (pictured in 2017) served as one of the producers for "The Blacker the Berry", particularly on its jazz section.

"The Blacker the Berry" was produced by American record producer and multi-instrumentalist Terrace Martin, who collaborated with musicians including Robert Glasper, Lalah Hathaway, Thundercat, and Anna Wise to create the politically charged track. During an interview with Billboard, Terrace Martin spoke about the creation of "The Blacker the Berry", revealing that Lamar completed the track's verses before adding the sung sections, while the former helped develop the track's musical arrangement. Its beat was driven by "hard-hitting" drums from producer Boi-1da, while Terrace Martin contributed jazz elements, particularly toward the track's conclusion, drawing on influences from Hathaway and James Fauntleroy.

Terrace Martin designed the jazz section at the ending of "The Blacker the Berry" to provide a sense of resolution after the intensity of the third verse. He collaborated with Robert Glasper on the Fender Rhodes, with additional contributions from Fauntleroy, Hathaway, and Thundercat on bass, to complete the arrangement. Terrace Martin reflected that the record addressed themes that were highly relevant to their lives at the time, describing it as a "soulful" work that combined social commentary with musical sophistication akin to political hip-hop group Public Enemy. The arrangement was intended to balance the confrontational and politically charged lyrics with a jazz-infused resolution, reinforcing the track's exploration of African-American pride and contemporary social issues.

== Composition and lyrics ==
"The Blacker the Berry" is a politically charged hip-hop track with a runtime of five minutes and twenty-eight seconds. As Lamar's first single following the late 2014 release of "i", "The Blacker the Berry" represents a stylistic and thematic departure from its predecessor, which promoted self-love. Unlike the upbeat and optimistic tone of the former, the latter adopts a discordant and intense sound, addressing issues of race and social injustice. BET compared its arrival at a "racially turbulent time" to the pro-Black era of the late 80s and early 90s through hip-hop artists including Public Enemy, Queen Latifah, X Clan, and Poor Righteous Teachers combining pride and history with boldness, which declined following the commercial success of gangsta rap. Lamar revealed that he wrote "The Blacker the Berry" shortly after Trayvon Martin's killing. Previously, he had addressed issues based on crime, race and violence through tracks including "Sing About Me, I'm Dying of Thirst" (2012).

"The Blacker The Berry"
A 30-second sample of Lamar rapping the song's opening lines. He addresses institutional violence and hypocrisy, with Lamar rapping confrontational lyrics over booming production.

"The Blacker the Berry" fuses a boom-bap beat akin to '90s New York hip-hop with subversive musical elements reminiscent of Parliament-Funkadelic that affirm Lamar's lyrics based on African-American heritage while confronting hatred, racism, and hypocrisy. In the lyrics, Lamar reflects critically on his own actions, including his complicity in systemic injustices in ways comparable to law enforcement. Unlike his typical melodic phrasing, Lamar delivers each line directly and forcefully, emphasizing the intensity of the track's message. The chorus is performed by Jamaican dancehall musician Assassin, in which he earned the feature thanks to his connection with Boi-1da.

The track opens with a dark, looping instrumental, including the repeated phrase, "the blacker the berry, sweeter the juice", sharing the title of the 1929 Wallace Thurman novel of the same name and the lyric from Tupac Shakur's "Keep Ya Head Up". Lamar begins by identifying himself as a hypocrite in 2015, establishing the confrontational tone of the track. Following the opening lines, he prophesies, "once I finish this witnesses will convey just what I mean." Throughout the track, Lamar celebrates his African-American heritage while bluntly tackling hatred and racism. He reflects on Black stereotypes from "my hair is nappy" to "my nose is round and wide", aiming them at people who would deploy them. The first two verses critique racial prejudice in the United States while Lamar simultaneously examines his own complicity, repeatedly referring to himself as "the biggest hypocrite of 2015." In the track's most confrontational passages, he addresses police brutality and the struggles of African-Americans, highlighting his roots and identity. Lamar's delivery alternates between anger and vulnerability, employing a guttural tone that conveys both intensity and clarity. The lyrics combine revolutionary themes with personal reflection, culminating in a final verse that broadens the track's social critique.

== Release ==
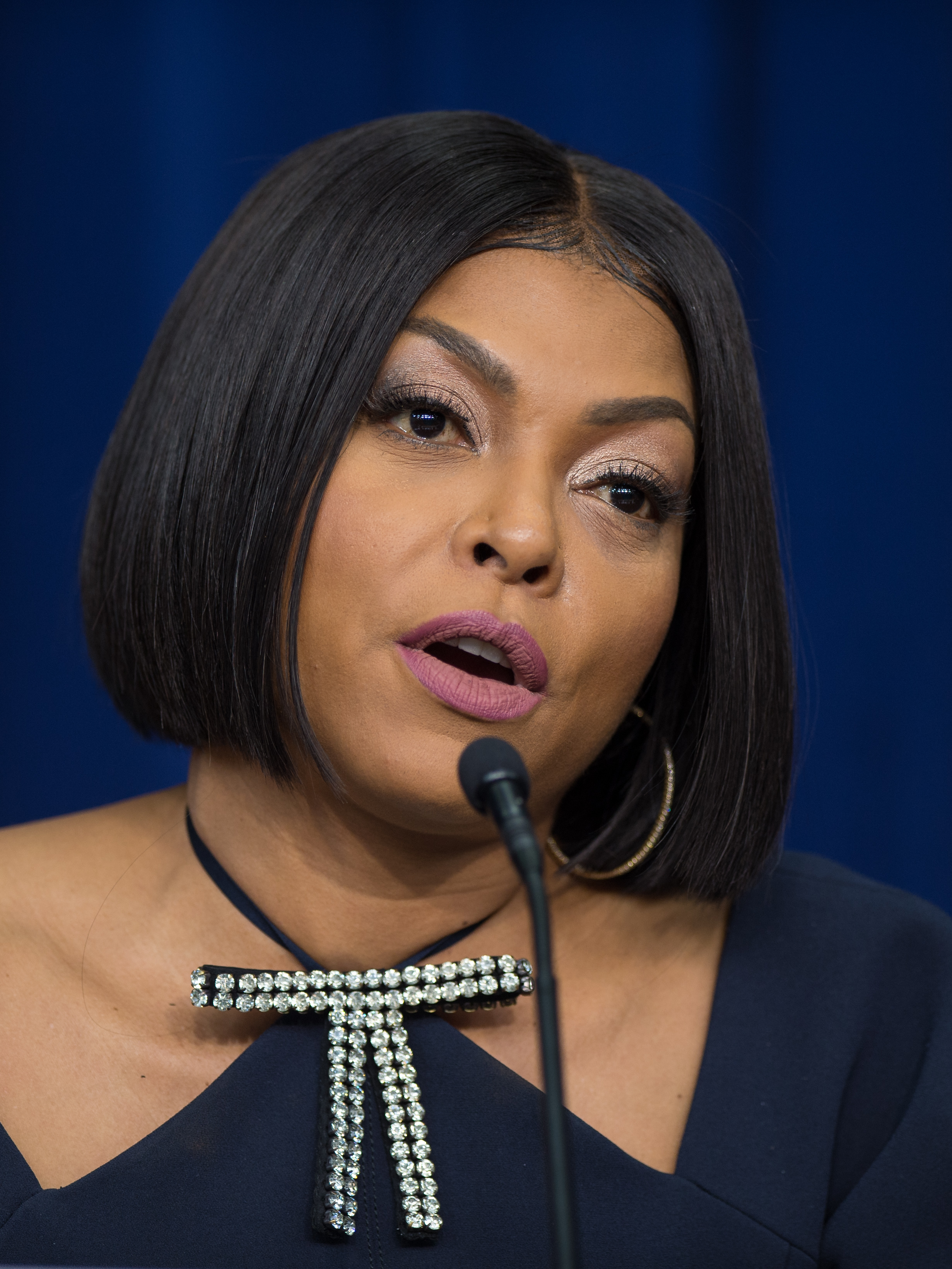
Taraji P. Henson (pictured in 2016) was the first to preview "The Blacker the Berry" on Twitter, considering it to be her favorite track on the album.

On February 9, 2015, "The Blacker the Berry" was released as the second single from To Pimp a Butterfly, which later released on March 15 through Top Dawg Entertainment, Aftermath Entertainment, and Interscope Records. The release followed Lamar's attendance at the 57th Annual Grammy Awards, where he won Best Rap Song and Best Rap Performance for his previous single, "I". "The Blacker the Berry" was first released by Empire actress Taraji P. Henson on Twitter, considering it to be her favorite track on the album. Within less than twenty-four hours following its release, the track received more than a million streams.

The release of "The Blacker the Berry" occurred in the context of commentary by influential rap figures on radio hesitancy to play Lamar's music, with Darryl McDaniels of Run-DMC suggesting that broadcasters avoided the track because of its persistent discussion of racial and social issues. Further explaining the track's context, he stated that "people are scared of a young man that looks like that from their neighborhood talking about real issues." Producer Terrace Martin noted that the track resonated with his personal experiences growing up in Los Angeles, observing that messages promoting self-love and anti-violence can be difficult to enact in environments where conflict is prevalent. He emphasized that while Lamar's lyrics advocate for unity and African-American pride, they also confront the harsh realities of street-level tensions that can undermine such messages.

=== Artwork lawsuit ===
The single's cover artwork contains a photograph by Giodano Cipriani, depicting a mother breastfeeding her two children, which was taken in 2011 while he was in Africa. On July 10, 2015, Cipriani filed a lawsuit against Lamar and his associated record labels Top Dawg, Aftermath, and Interscope Records, claiming that they used the photograph without his permission, and demanded that he receive $150,000 for each time it was used. Both parties reached a settlement by November 2016, and the lawsuit was dismissed the following month.

== Critical reception ==
"The Blacker the Berry" received widespread acclaim from music critics. August Brown of the Los Angeles Times complimented the track for its fusion of "ideas, angst, and affirmations" of Lamar's impact. Alexis Petridis of The Guardian described the track as "remarkable", comparing Lamar's intense vocal delivery to Ice Cube's work, while noting that the track channels the post-Ferguson social climate with a mix of fury and self-reflection. Pitchfork selected "The Blacker the Berry" as their "Best New Track", with reviewer Jayson Greene identifying it as one of Lamar's most focused and emotionally affecting performances. Iyana Robertson of Vibe evaluated the track positively, claiming that it serves as an "avenue of understanding" for the Black community, as well as recommending non-black people to listen to Lamar's "ripping cry of blackness."

Spencer Kornhaber of The Atlantic stated that Lamar wanted to highlight black pride "The Blacker the Berry" while the memory of Lamar's past actions shadow through. Steven J. Horowitz of Billboard gave the track four-and-a-half out of five stars, emphasizing its powerful engagement with the Black Lives Matter movement. Kyle Anderson from Entertainment Weekly described the track as "galvanizing", while David Jeffries of AllMusic and Patrick Ryan of USA Today highlighted it as a standout track on the album, particularly noting its darker, more confrontational tone.

Retrospectively, "The Blacker the Berry" was ranked number 12 on The New York Times' list of "25 Songs That Tell Us Where Music Is Going" in 2016. Reviewed by Marlon James, he presented the track as a powerful and confrontational work by highlighting Lamar's use of intense, self-critical lyricism to exlore themes of systemic injustice and personal complicity. In 2025, Rolling Stone ranked "The Blacker the Berry" at number 17 on their list of "The 60 Best Kendrick Lamar Songs", reflecting on the track as a "forceful in-your-face statement."

=== Michael Chabon's response ===
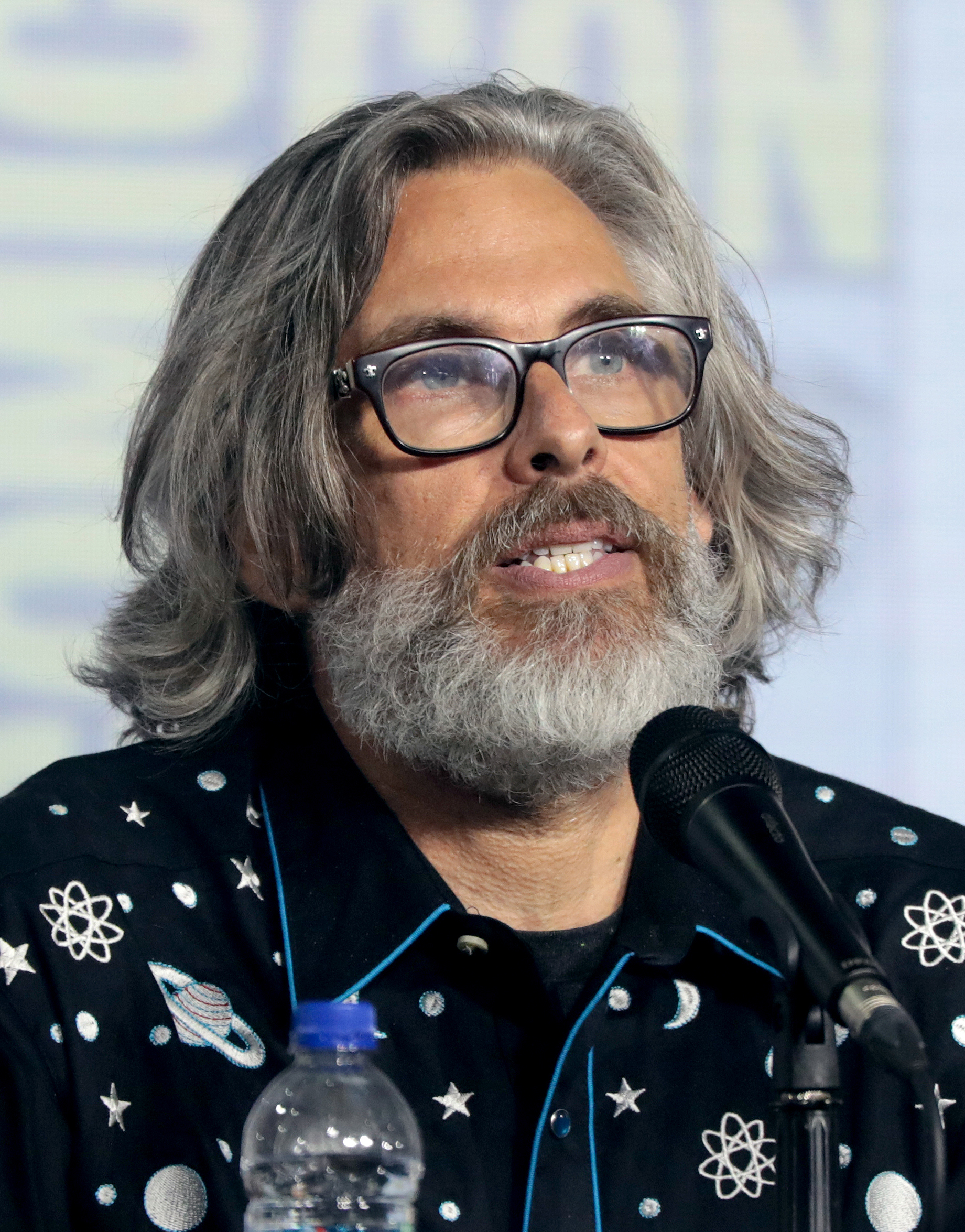
Author Michael Chabon (pictured in 2019) wrote analysis based on "The Blacker the Berry" on Genius.

Upon its release, author Michael Chabon, known for his works The Amazing Adventures of Kavalier and Clay (2000) and Telegraph Avenue (2012), gave his analysis on the lyrics of "The Blacker the Berry" on website Genius, particularly Lamar's lyric based on Trayvon Martin's killing. Describing the lyric, Chabon wrote that Lamar exerts a rhetorical move similar to the final line of Common's "I Used to Love H.E.R." (1994), which the latter reveals the identity of "her" as hip-hop itself. Continuing this comparison, he further explained their similarity with Lamar's use of "you" that represents the Black community as a whole. Chabon considered the song's use of hypocrisy "a much more complicated moral position than is generally allowed, and perhaps an inevitable one."

=== Controversy ===
The track generated controversy for lines in which Lamar reflects on violence within the African-American community, including: "So why did I weep when Trayvon Martin was in the street, when gang-banging make me kill a nigga blacker than me? Hypocrite!", which some listeners interpreted as a critique of the Black community itself. During an interview with MTV News, while breaking down To Pimp a Butterfly at the W New York Downtown, Lamar spoke about the single, his Billboard interview, and the criticism he's faced. Lamar clarified that the lyrics were autobiographical, drawing on his personal experiences with gang culture and the systemic pressures he observed in his environment. He emphasized that the track examines his own actions and complicity rather than serving as a general judgment of others, and he asked audiences to consider his background and perspective when evaluating the track.

== Commercial success ==
Upon its release, "The Blacker the Berry" peaked at number 66 on the Billboard Hot 100 and number 32 on its Hot R&B/Hip-Hop Songs chart. In the United Kingdom, the track peaked at number 83 on the UK singles chart, while having greater success at number 20 on its Hip Hop/R&B Singles charts. In Flanders, Belgium, it peaked at number 87 and number 44 on its Bubbling Under and Urban charts, respectively. On June 8, 2018, the Recording Industry Association of America (RIAA) certified "The Blacker the Berry" as Gold, selling over 500,000 units. It was also certified to sell more than 15,000 units in New Zealand, 35,000 units in Australia, and 40,000 units in Canada.

== Live performances ==
Lamar first performed "The Blacker the Berry" live alongside "King Kunta" and "Hood Politics" at Hot 97's Summer Jam on June 7, 2015. On February 15, 2016, at the 58th Grammy Awards, Lamar performed a medley of "The Blacker the Berry" and "Alright". Introduced by actor Don Cheadle, Lamar began the set marching onstage in chains, with a prison-like backdrop during the track, before transitioning into "Alright", performed around a bonfire. The performance concluded with an untitled freestyle featuring an illuminated outline of Compton, Lamar's hometown, in the outline of Africa. Throughout the freestyle, Lamar makes a reference to February 26, the date of Trayvon Martin's death in 2012. On June 26, 2022, Lamar performed "The Blacker the Berry" at the Glastonsbury Festival.

== Credits and personnel ==
Credits are adapted from the liner notes of To Pimp a Butterfly.

- Kendrick Duckworth – lead vocals, writing
- Derek Ali – recording, mixing
- Stephen "Thundercat" Bruner – bass guitar
- Jeffrey Campbell – vocals, writing
- Larrance Dopson – percussion
- Zale Epstein – writing
- Robert Glasper – keyboard
- Lalah Hathaway – backing vocals
- James Hunt – recording
- Alexander Izquierdo – writing
- Ken Lewis – writing
- Katalyst – drum programming, engineer
- Brent Kolatalo – writing
- Stephen Kozmeniuk – writing, producing
- Terrace Martin – producing, alto saxophone
- Matthew Samuels – producing, writing
- Matt Schaeffer – recording

== Charts ==
Chart (2015)	Peak position
Belgium (Ultratip Bubbling Under Flanders)	87
Belgium Urban (Ultratop Flanders)	44
UK Singles (Official Charts)	83
UK Hip Hop/R&B (Official Charts)	20
US Billboard Hot 100	66
US Hot R&B/Hip-Hop Songs (Billboard)	32

== Certifications ==
Region	Certification	Certified units/sales
Australia (ARIA)	Gold	35,000^{‡}
Canada (Music Canada)	Gold	40,000^{‡}
New Zealand (RMNZ)	Gold	15,000^{‡}
United States (RIAA)	Gold	500,000^{‡}
^{‡} Sales+streaming figures based on certification alone.
