= Rahki =

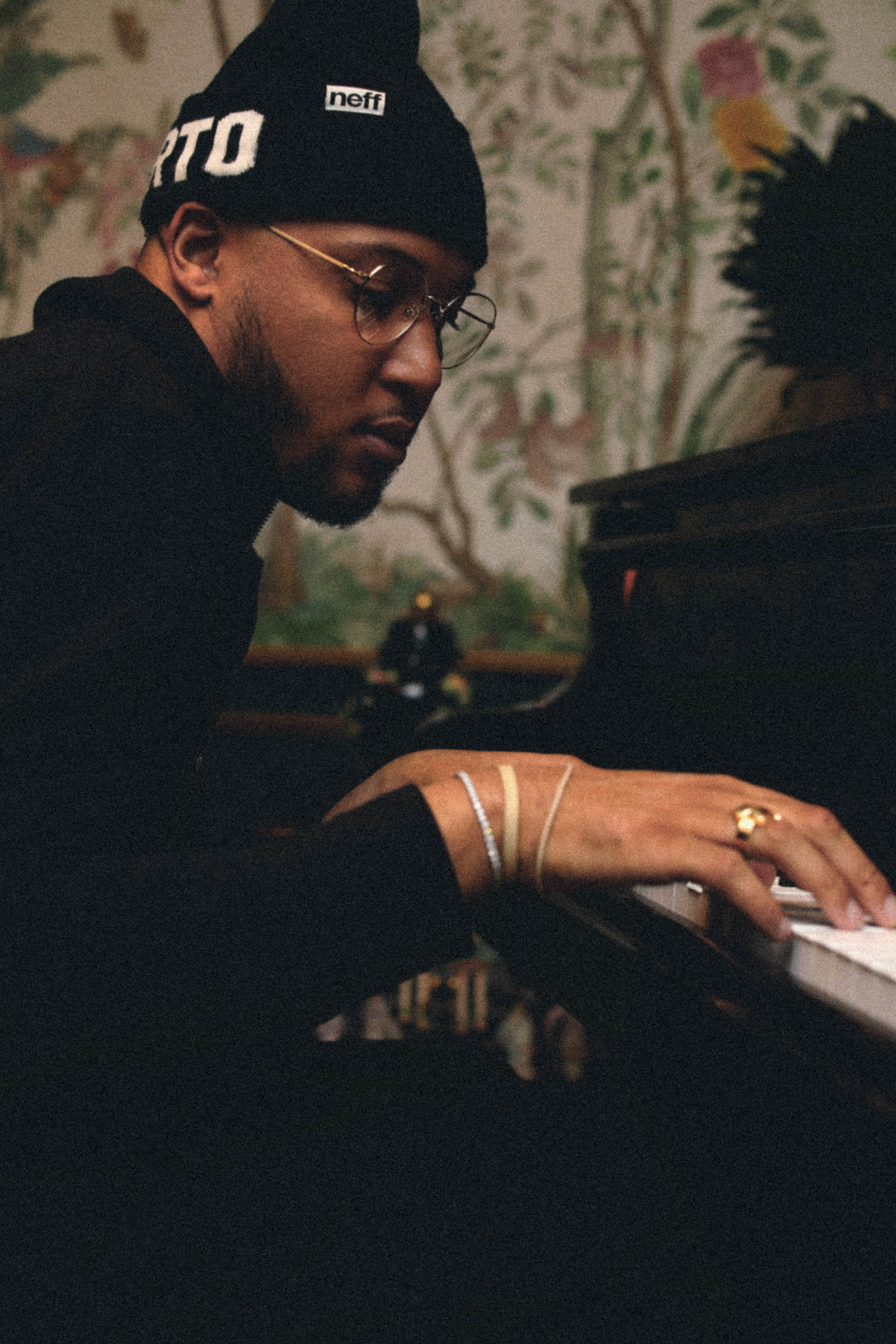
- Rahki in 2020

Background information
- Also known as: Rahki Beats
- Born: Columbus Smith III Minneapolis, Minnesota, United States
- Origin: Los Angeles, California, United States
- Genres: Hip hop; R&B; pop
- Occupations: Record Producer; songwriter; drummer
- Instruments: Drums; keyboard; bass; Ableton
- Years active: 2009–Present
- Website: rahki.com

Columbus Smith III, better known by his stage name Rahki (sometimes Rahki Beats), is a Grammy Award-winning American record producer and songwriter from Minneapolis, Minnesota. He is known for his work with mentor DJ Khalil and acts such as Eminem, Kendrick Lamar, Currensy, Evidence, Schoolboy Q, 50 Cent, Domo Genesis, Lecrae, Aloe Blacc, and more. In 2018, Rahki was the executive producer on Rejjie Snow's album titled, Dear Annie. Rahki was also responsible for the cover artwork for the album, and his son contributed vocals to the opening song "Hello".

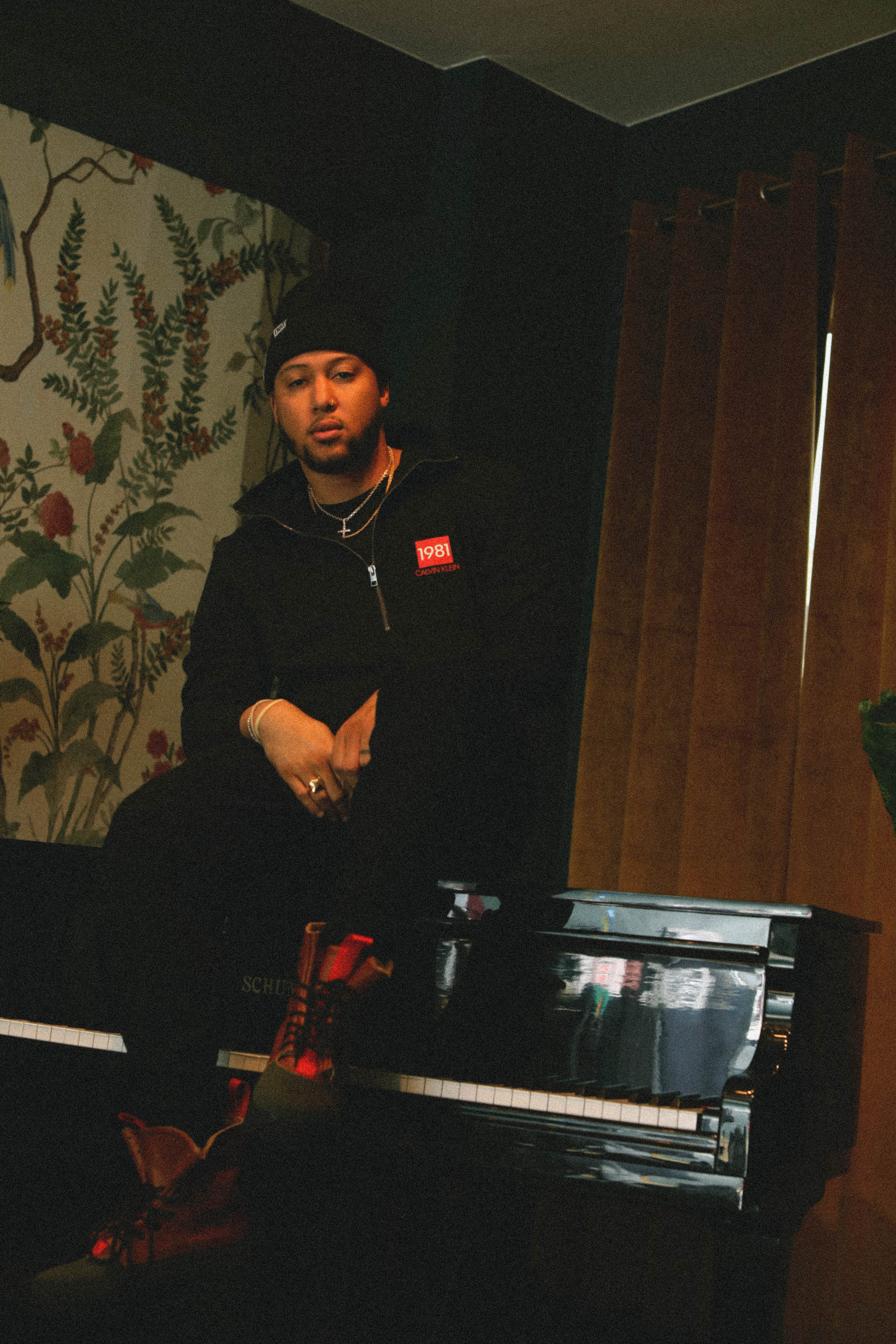
Rahki in 2020

== Songwriting and production credits ==
Title	Year	Artist(s)	Album	Credits
"Thru the Mud"	2023	Dave East	Fortune Favors the Bold	Producer
"BAD INFLUENCES FROM MY UNCLE"	2023	ICEBOLDBISHOP	GENERATIONAL CURSE	Producer
"Many Thanks"	2022	Grip	5 & A F*** You	Producer
"Good"	2022	Grip	5 & A F*** You	Producer
"Survivors Guilt"	2022	Joey Bada$$	2000	Producer
"Make You Proud"	2022	Jensen McRae	Are You Happy Now?	Producer
"Take It Easy"	2022	Jensen McRae	Are You Happy Now?	Producer
"Machines"	2022	Jensen McRae	Are You Happy Now?	Producer
"Good Legs"	2022	Jensen McRae	Are You Happy Now?	Producer
"With the Lights On"	2022	Jensen McRae	Are You Happy Now?	Producer
"Headlock, Pt. 1 - Mother"	2022	Jensen McRae	Are You Happy Now?	Producer
"Headlock, Pt. 2 - Father"	2022	Jensen McRae	Are You Happy Now?	Producer
"Headlock, Pt. 3 - Daughter"	2022	Jensen McRae	Are You Happy Now?	Producer
"Glenwood Freestyle!"	2021	GRIP	I Died for This!?	Producer
"Mad Love Remix (feat. Tobe Nwigwe, Rapsody) - Remix"	2021	Infinity Song, Rapsody, Tobe Nwigwe	Mad Love (Deluxe)	Additional Programming
"Adam's Ribs"	2021	Jensen McRae	Who Hurt You?	Producer
"Dead Girl Walking"	2021	Jensen McRae	Who Hurt You?	Producer
"White Boy"	2021	Jensen McRae	Who Hurt You?	Producer
"Immune"	2021	Jensen McRae	Who Hurt You?	Producer
"Wolves"	2021	Jensen McRae	Who Hurt You?	Producer
"Starting To Get To You"	2021	Jensen McRae	Who Hurt You?	Producer
"Immune"	2021	Jensen McRae	Single	Producer
"Gone"	2021	Jorja Smith	Single	Producer
"Weekend"	2021	Jorja Smith	Be Right Back	Additional Programming
"We Could Never Die"	2020	Rylo Rodriguez	G.I.H.F.	Producer
"Strange Fruit"	2020	Jensen McRae	I Can't Breathe / Music For The Movement	Producer
"Wolves"	2019	Jensen McRae	Wolves - Single	Producer
"White Boy"	2019	Jensen McRae	White Boy - Single	Producer
"Bitch Ass"	2019	Pell	Bitch Ass	Producer
"Pass By"	2019	Pell	Gravity	Producer
"Sip"	2019	Pell	Gravity	Producer
"NOLA Grown"	2019	Pell	Gravity	Producer
"Fields"	2019	EARTHGANG, Malik	Mirrorland	Producer
"7th Heaven"	2019	QUIN	(non-album single)	Producer
"MEDICATED"	2019	Kari Faux	CRY 4 HELP	Producer
"Annie"	2018	Rejjie Snow, Jesse Boykins III	Dear Annie	Producer
"Greatness"	2018	Rejjie Snow, Micah Freeman	Dear Annie	Producer
"Spaceships"	2018	Rejjie Snow, Ebenezer	Dear Annie	Producer
"23"	2018	Rejjie Snow, Caroline Smith	Dear Annie	Producer
"SURVIVOR"	2018	Elley Duhé	Dragon Mentally	Producer
"COUNTERFEIT"	2018	Elley Duhé	Dragon Mentally	Producer
"Can You Touch"	2018	Elley Duhé	non-album single	Producer
"Everybody's Hero"	2017	Sampa The Great, Estelle	HERoes Act 2	Producer
"The Plug"	2017	Sampa The Great, Estelle	HERoes Act 2	Producer
"Paved In Gold"	2017	Sampa The Great, Estelle	HERoes Act 2	Producer
"Crooked Cops"	2017	Rejjie Snow	non-album single	Producer
"Man"	2017	"Star" Cast	non-album single	Producer
"Insecurities"	2017	Syd	Fin	Producer
"INvocation"	2016	Ab-Soul, Kokane	Do What Thou Wilt.	Producer
"Resurrection"	2016	Hodgy	Fireplace: TheNotTheOtherSide	Producer
"Swear Jar"	2016	ILLY	Two Degrees	Producer
"D.R.U.G.S."	2016	Rejjie Snow	non-album singles	Producer
"Pink Beetle"	2016	Rejjie Snow	non-album singles	Producer
"All I Got"	2016	Sonreal	The Name	Producer (with Matt Rad)
"Hot Air Balloon"	2016	Sonreal	The Name	Producer
"Ocean Song"	2015	Talib Kweli, Mela Machinko	Train of Thought: Lost Lyrics, Rare Releases & Beautiful B-Sides Vol.1	Producer
"i"	2015	Kendrick Lamar	To Pimp a Butterfly	Producer
"Institutionalized"	2015	Kendrick Lamar, Bilal, Anna Wise, Snoop Dogg	To Pimp a Butterfly	Producer (with Tommy Black)
"Light"	2015	Brenna Whitaker	Brenna Whitaker	Producer
"Stigmata"	2014	Ab-Soul, Asaad, Action Bronson	These Days...	Producer
"Happy Birthday"	2014	Mac Miller	Faces	Producer
"Perfect Words"	2014	Thurz, Kelsey Burkin	Designer EP	Producer
The Man	2013	Aloe Blacc	Lift Your Spirit	Drums
"Can You Do This"	2013	Aloe Blacc	Lift Your Spirit	Drums
"Chasing"	2013	Aloe Blacc	Lift Your Spirit	Drums
"The Hand is Quicker"	2013	Aloe Blacc	Lift Your Spirit	Drums
"'Hell of a Night"	2013	Travis Scott	Owl Pharaoh	Producer (with DJ Dahi, Rey Reel, and Travis Scott)
"Lost in The Bossness"	2012	Currensy	The Stoned Immaculate	Producer (with Butcher Brown)
"Black Boy Fly"	2012	Kendrick Lamar	Good Kid, M.A.A.D City	Producer
"Gravity"	2012	Lecrae	Gravity	Producer
"Swagg"	2012	Precious Paris	From Paris With Love	Producer
"My City"	2012	Rocky Diamonds	The Diamond Life 2	Producer
"Diamond Life"	2012	Styles P	The Diamond Life	Producer
"#Jetsgo"	2011	Currensy	Weekend at Burnie's	Producer
"Echo"	2011	Bad Meets Evil	Hell: The Sequel	Additional programming
"It Wasn't Me"	2011	Evidence	Cats & Dogs	Producer
"Falling Down"	2011	Evidence	Cats & Dogs	Producer
"Ricky"	2011	The Game	The R.E.D. Album	Drums
"Mission Statement"	2011	Domo Genesis	Under the Influence	Producer
"Dreaming"	2011	Slim The Mobster	War Music	Producer
"50s My Favorite"	2011	50 Cent	Street King Energy Drink	Prod
"Won't Back Down"	2010	Eminem	Recovery	Additional programming

== Accolades ==
Grammy Awards

Year	Nominee / work	Award	Result
2011	Recovery (Writer, Programming & Keyboards)	Best Rap Album	Won
2011	"Recovery" (Writer, Programming & Keyboards)	Album of the Year	Nominated
2013	Gravity (Drums)	Best Gospel Album	Won
2014	"Good Kid, M.A.A.D City" (as producer)	Album of the Year	Nominated
2014	"Good Kid, M.A.A.D City" (as producer)	Best Rap Album	Nominated
2015	"i" (as producer)	Best Rap Song	Won
2015	"Lift Your Spirit" (Drums)	Best R&B Album	Nominated
2016	"To Pimp a Butterfly" (as producer)	Album of the Year	Nominated
2016	"To Pimp a Butterfly" (as producer)	Best Rap Album	Won
