= Mortal Man =

2015 song by Kendrick Lamar

Song by Kendrick Lamar

from the album To Pimp a Butterfly
- Released: March 15, 2015
- Recorded: around 2015 (Grammy's)
- Genre: Free jazz; spoken word; jazz rap
- Length: 12:07
- Label: TDE; Aftermath; Interscope
- Songwriters: Kendrick Duckworth; Mark Spears; Stephen Bruner; Fela Anikulapo Kuti
- Producer: Sounwave

"Mortal Man" is a song by the American rapper Kendrick Lamar. It is the sixteenth and final track from his third studio album To Pimp a Butterfly, released on March 15, 2015 through Top Dawg Entertainment, Aftermath Entertainment and Interscope Records. The song was written by Duckworth alongside Sounwave (who also produced the song), and Thundercat. The song samples Fela Kuti's cover of Houston Person's "I No Get Eye for Back", and thus, Kuti is credited as a songwriter.

A 12-minute long song, it is 3 seconds longer than "Sing About Me, I'm Dying of Thirst" at 12:04, composed of a song section, a poem section, and ends with a faux-interview between Lamar and the late rapper Tupac Shakur. The track encompasses free jazz, spoken word, jazz rap, and was positively received by music critics upon its release, praising the song as one of the best from the album and Lamar's discography. Although the song was not released as a single, it would chart at number 7 on the Billboard Bubbling Under Hot R&B/Hip-Hop Singles chart in the United States.

== Background ==
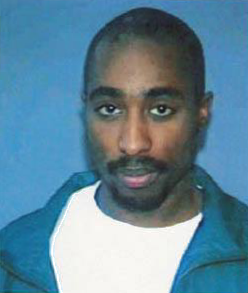
"Mortal Man" extensively samples a 1994 P3 Soul interview with Tupac Shakur.

Written by Lamar while on Kanye West's Yeezus Tour, "Mortal Man" ends with a simulated interview between Lamar and the late Tupac Shakur. It was sourced from an obscure, previously unreleased November 1994 interview between Shakur and Mats Nileskär (host of Swedish radio station P3 Soul) that took place only weeks before the former was shot at Quad Studios. Lamar met Nileskär in Germany in 2014 and he gave him the audio, which Tupac's stepbrother Mopreme Shakur and mother Afeni Shakur approved the sampling of. According to Tupac Shakur estate-affiliate Tom Whalley, Lamar himself came up with the idea of appending a posthumous interview with Shakur to the end of "Mortal Man". Lamar said he was inspired to make the song after seeing Shakur's shadow talk to him while asleep, in addition to realizing that they were both born in June. Whalley stated that he "didn't really hear the final results until" after To Pimp a Butterfly's release. The original, unadulterated interview was publicly released around the same time as the album.

Top Dawg president Punch recalled in an Instagram post that during To Pimp a Butterfly's creation, Lamar "was feeling a bit lost in the concept" and so asked him to "write something to sum up the album". His words were later added to the end of "Mortal Man". In an interview with MTV, Lamar stated that the song's title meant that he is "just a man". The song's inspiration was his 2014 trip to Robben Island, South Africa where Nelson Mandela had before been imprisoned; in addition, Lamar has said it is about how people seem to point out others' flaws without seeing "the big picture", citing Jesus as an example. According to Miles Mosley, invited by Kamasi Washington near the end of To Pimp a Butterfly's production, he came over to the studio to record double bass on the track.

== Composition and lyrics ==
"Mortal Man" samples a 1977 cover of Fela Kuti's 1975 song "I No Get Eye for Back" by Houston Person, in addition to incorporating "mid-tempo drums and muffled orchestration". The track begins with a melodic section: there are references to popular figures such as Nelson Mandela, Martin Luther King Jr., Huey P. Newton, Malcolm X, John F. Kennedy, Jesse Jackson, Jackie Robinson, Michael Jackson, and Moses, with a chorus that asks "When shit hits the fan, is you still a fan?". The analyst Monica R. Miller says the line questions if fans of Lamar would continue to be loyal to him in difficult or controversial circumstances.

Throughout the entirety of To Pimp a Butterfly, a recited poem is slowly revealed until the part after the song section of "Mortal Man" renders it in its entirety. (Note: Sources refer to the name of the poem as either "Mortal Man" or "Another Nigga".) After the reading, Lamar simulates an interview with Tupac Shakur that slowly incorporates free jazz, in which they discuss "fame, the fattening of the upper class and the lifecycle of the black man's power". Finally, he tells Shakur of a black-related metaphor about caterpillars and butterflies: it argues that people who live on the street are like caterpillars that must use up all surrounding resources, turning into butterflies if they realize their potential. According to Miller, the cocoon stage in between could symbolize "life, death, the system, [or] the industry that pimps out artists before they can become butterflies". The analyst Sequoia Maner said that "Mortal Man" was its album's "crown jewel" and acted as its "thesis statement".

== Critical reception and legacy ==
Devon Jefferson of AllHipHop referred to "Mortal Man" as "one of Kendrick Lamar's most notable, critically acclaimed album deep cuts". Ben Travis wrote for GQ that the track is "a jaw-dropping conclusion that snaps everything before it into focus". Kyle Anderson of Entertainment Weekly selected it as one of To Pimp a Butterfly's best two tracks, while ABC News called "Mortal Man"'s faux-interview weird but stirring. In 2022, BuzzFeed's Kasim Kabbara ranked it as Lamar's 26th-best song, calling the track a "powerful outro". Some criticized a line about the singer Michael Jackson ("That nigga gave us 'Billie Jean', you say he touched those kids?"), perceiving it to be excusing his sexual abuse allegations.

"Mortal Man" was covered by Terrace Martin on his 2016 album Velvet Portraits.

== Charts ==
Chart performance for "Mortal Man"
Chart (2015)	Peak position
US Bubbling Under R&B/Hip-Hop Singles (Billboard)	7
