= What It Comes Down To =

Single by The Isley Brothers

from the album 3 + 3
- B-side: "The Highways of My Life"
- Released: 1973
- Recorded: 1973, The Record Plant, Los Angeles California
- Genre: Rock, soul, funk
- Length: 3:47
- Label: T-Neck
- Songwriter: The Isley Brothers
- Producer: The Isley Brothers

The Isley Brothers singles chronology
"That Lady" (1973)	"What It Comes Down To" (1973)	"The Highways of My Life" (1974)

"What It Comes Down To" is a song by The Isley Brothers, who released it in late 1973 as a follow-up to the group's crossover pop hit, "That Lady, Pt. 1 & 2".

== Song information ==
Both songs were featured on the group's Epic debut, 3 + 3. It features a synthesizer keyboard solo from Chris Jasper, Ernie Isley on guitar and Ronald Isley on lead vocals. The b-side of the song was the ballad "The Highways of My Life".

== Charts ==
The song peaked at number 55 on the Billboard Hot 100, and was a top five hit on the R&B singles chart where it peaked at number 5.

== Personnel ==
- Ronald Isley – lead vocals
- Ronald Isley, Rudolph Isley and O'Kelly Isley Jr. – backing vocals
- Ernie Isley – guitars, percussion, backing vocals
- Marvin Isley – bass guitar, backing vocals
- Chris Jasper – electric piano, clavinet, ARP synthesizer, backing vocals
- Truman Thomas – Hammond organ
- George Moreland – drums
