= Chinwe Obinwa =

Nigerian-British psychiatrist

- Born: Nigeria
- Education: University of Jos
- Known for: President of the Association of Black Psychiatrists (ABP-UK)
- Medical career
- Profession: Physician
- Field: Psychiatry
- Institutions: Derbyshire Healthcare NHS Foundation Trust
- Sub-specialties: Forensic psychiatry

Chinwe Obinwa is a British forensic psychiatrist of Nigerian origin, based with the Derbyshire Healthcare NHS Foundation Trust, and president of the Association of Black Psychiatrists (ABP-UK) in the United Kingdom.

== Early life and education ==
Chinwe Obinwa was born in Nigeria, one of four siblings to her mother, a teacher, and father who died young. In 1998, she graduated in medicine from the University of Jos, Lagos.

== Career ==
In 2000, Obinwa began her training in neuropsychiatry at the Federal Neuro-Psychiatric Hospital, Yaba, Lagos. In 2023 she became a fellow of the Royal College of Psychiatrists.

She co-designed an online survey to study discrimination, the results of which were published by Cambridge University Press in 2025. In the same year she was noted as president of the Association of Black Psychiatrists (ABP-UK) in the United Kingdom.

== Selected publications ==
- Talabi, Olufemi; Shonibare, Oluwafunminiireayomi; Ogundalu, Abisola; Akanle, Olukemi; Fapohunda, Mosun; Sule, Akeem; Omojuwa, Toyin; Kwentoh, Mona-Lisa; Nwokolo, Isioma; Edwards, Allison; Orimoloye, Olamide; Ofovwe-Onwusi, Fejiro; Ijete, Elohor; Medubi, Adeyinka; Obinwa, Chinwe (July 2023). "The Association of Black Psychiatrists-UK Culture Club: The Experience So Far and Proposed Future Directions". BJPsych Open. 9 (S1): S37. doi:10.1192/bjo.2023.160. ISSN 2056-4724. PMC 10345474.
- Toma, Ioana; Obinwa, Chinwe; Rathnaiah, Mohan (2024). "A case of posterior cortical atrophy and paranoid schizophrenia". Progress in Neurology and Psychiatry. 28 (1): 22–25. doi:10.1002/pnp.824. ISSN 1931-227X.
