= Association of Black Psychiatrists (UK) =

- Formation: 2020
- Founded at: United Kingdom
- President: Mosun Fapohunda
- Past President: Chinwe Obinwa

The Association of Black Psychiatrists (UK), founded in 2020, is a British learned society that promotes professional development of Black psychiatrists through education and networking. In 2021 it created the Culture Club which explores links between popular culture, Black mental health, and shared experiences of racism.

== See also ==
- Royal College of Psychiatrists
