= How Much a Dollar Cost =

2015 song by Kendrick Lamar

Song by Kendrick Lamar featuring James Fauntleroy and Ronald Isley

from the album To Pimp a Butterfly
- Released: March 15, 2015
- Genre: Conscious hip hop
- Length: 4:21
- Label: TDE; Aftermath; Interscope
- Songwriters: Kendrick Duckworth; James Fauntleroy II; Ronald Isley; Terrace Martin; Josef Leimberg; Rose McKinney
- Producer: LoveDragon

Audio
- "How Much a Dollar Cost" on YouTube

"How Much a Dollar Cost" is a song by the American rapper Kendrick Lamar featuring vocals from James Fauntleroy and Ronald Isley, the latter from The Isley Brothers. It is the eleventh track on his third studio album To Pimp a Butterfly, released on March 15, 2015 through Top Dawg Entertainment, Aftermath Entertainment and Interscope Records. It was written by Lamar, Terrace Martin, Josef Leimberg, Rose McKinney, Fauntleroy and Isley and produced by LoveDragon. Lyrically, the conscious hip-hop song describes Lamar's encounter with a beggar, who later reveals himself to be God.

The song was received positively by music critics upon its release, with then-US president Barack Obama calling it the best song of 2015. Despite the song not being released as a single, it charted at number 27 on the UK Hip Hop and R&B Singles Charts, number 40 on the US Billboard Hot R&B/Hip-Hop Songs chart, and number 9 on the US Billboard Bubbling Under Hot 100 chart, the latter being the song's highest peak on any chart it made.

== Background and composition ==
In an interview with MTV, Kendrick Lamar called the song "a true story". He elaborated: "These are moments in my life deeper than just handing somebody a dollar. These are actually moments of integrity, actually being able to talk to somebody. Me talking to him was simply a thank you from God. And I felt God speaking through him to get at me." The biographer Marcus J. Moore says the song was in fact inspired by an encounter Lamar had with a homeless man asking for ten rand at a gas station during a visit in Cape Town, South Africa. When asked about the song's message by TMZ, Lamar said: "Help as many people as you can, man, if you want to live forever." Miles Mosley said he was invited by Kamasi Washington near the end of To Pimp a Butterfly's production, to come to the studio to record double bass on the track.

Many fans have suspected the song interpolates the piano on "Pyramid Song" (2001) by the English band Radiohead, however Radiohead are not credited anywhere on the liner notes. Critics noted the "half-drunk lumbering" instrumental consisting of a brass section with "smooth piano", which polyrhythmically combines 3/4 and 4/4 time. They also said that the song was one of the less contentious, rebellion-focused, energetic and well-known tracks on its album. James Fauntleroy sings the refrain and Ronald Isley chorally closes the song. Nathan Stevens of Spectrum Culture said the latter's contribution reminded him of "The Tears of a Clown" (1970) by Smokey Robinson.

== Composition and lyrics ==
"How Much a Dollar Cost" tells a story that consists of three movements. In the first verse, Lamar feels well as he parks at a gas station in an expensive automobile. He then refuses a request for a dollar asked by a homeless man he approaches and re-enters his car. In verse two, Lamar contemplates if he should have accepted the man's request. The beggar then references Exodus 14 of the Bible ("A humble man is all that we ever need"), causing Lamar in the third verse to reflect on the great leverage a single person can have on saving someone going through hardship. This causes him to feel regret; then, the beggar tells him he has lost "a spot in Heaven" and reveals his identity as being God. The writer J. T. Young says that the song ends with what could be Lamar's inner dialogue asking for redemption.

The analysts Gregory S. Parks and Derek S. Hicks suggest the question "How much a dollar really cost?" asks not what money can actually buy, but the "loss or penalty incurred especially in gaining [it]" or hoarding it. According to Young, the song's story alludes to parts in the Bible such as Matthew 25 and Jesus and the rich young man. The professor Brady D. Lund stated that it "plays on your own innate biases [...] through the art of the slow reveal", arguing that this and creating an emotional connection with the song's listener and the beggar helps with pushing the track's message. Parks and Hicks also studied how "the tension Lamar's character embodies carries the weight of both sides of the political spectrum in relationship to the poor", saying how he has an inner battle with either using system justification or the religious tendency to donate to needy persons.

== Reception and legacy ==
In 2015, then-US president Barack Obama expressed his acclaim by calling "How Much a Dollar Cost" his favorite song of the year in an interview with People. Matthew Strauss of Inverse theorized that this was because the track was "the most explicitly Christian" song on "a generally Christian album", and the song's theme of having to focus on "macro issues" while sacrificing "specific instances" of pain was "an apt analog for politics". R+R=Now, a nu jazz supergroup headed by the American pianist Robert Glasper, covered the song live and released it as a promotional single for their album R+R=Now Live in 2021.

Byard Duncan of GQ called the song's lyrics "among the most forceful arguments for Lamar-as-craftsman". Tiny Mix Tapes's Matthew Phillips wrote that Lamar's detractors should "recognize the authenticity of his approach to his religion", which he thought was more about "active love", "Gospel wisdom and revolutionary healing". In 2018, Complex ranked the song as Lamar's seventh-best; in 2021, Rolling Stone ranked it as his 40th-best; in 2022, Uproxx ranked it as his eighth-best. In 2023, American Songwriter listed "How Much a Dollar Cost" as one "of the most impactful hip-hop songs that address worldwide conflict".

== Charts ==
Chart (2015)	Peak position
UK Hip Hop/R&B (Official Charts)	27
US Bubbling Under Hot 100 (Billboard)	9
US Hot R&B/Hip-Hop Songs (Billboard)	40
