= Colour of Love (Amber song) =

1996 single by Amber

Single by Amber

from the album This Is Your Night
- Released: 1996
- Genre: Euro-NRG; Europop
- Length: 3:36
- Label: Tommy Boy
- Songwriters: Marie- Claire Cremers (Amber); Christian Berman
- Producer: Berman Brothers

Amber singles chronology
"This Is Your Night" (1996)	"Colour of Love" (1996)	"If You Could Read My Mind" (1998)

Music video
- "Colour of Love" on YouTube

"Colour of Love" is a song recorded by Dutch-German singer-songwriter Amber. It was released in 1996 by Tommy Boy Records as the second single from the singer's debut album of the same name (1996), and is the follow-up to her successful hit, "This Is Your Night". The song is co-written by Amber with Berman Brothers, who also produced it, and charted in several countries, like Australia, Iceland and New Zealand. In the latter, it was a bigger hit than "This is Your Night, peaking at number 31. On the US Billboard Hot 100, the song peaked at number 74 in 1997. On the Billboard Hot Dance Club Play chart, it peaked at number five. The accompanying music video features Amber performing in what appears to be a yellow submarine.

On June 17, 2022, the Jonathan Peters & Anthony Acid Trenergy Hard Remix, which was never previously issued commercially, was released to all digital platforms internationally as part of the Amber Remixed - Extended Versions long form compilation of club remixes.

== Critical reception ==
Barry Walters for The Advocate named the song a "sugarcoated treat". AllMusic editor Alex Henderson described it as "European-sounding", noting that it's not "unlike something '80s dance duo Fun Fun would have done". Larry Flick from Billboard magazine complimented it as a "solid", "engaging", "infectious and perky Euro-NRG twirler", adding that "her performance is nothing short of star-powered." Jeffrey Lee Puckett from The Courier-Journal felt the song "ups the dance quotient", "but it also boasts a pure-pop hook." L.A. Times noted Amber's "giddy exuberance". A reviewer from Music Week wrote, "What promises to be jaunty soon turns anodyne for an artist enjoying Top 20 US success. Sadly, rather formulaic Euro-pop from the Dutch-born singer."

== Track listing ==
- 12" single, UK (1996)
1. "Colour of Love" (Colourful Club Mix) — 6:07
2. "Colour of Love" (Berman 12" Mix) — 6:39
3. "Colour of Love" (Colour Of Bass Mix) — 6:59
4. "Colour of Love" (AJ Trenergy Hard Mix) — 7:08
5. "Colour of Love" (Colourful Radio Edit) — 4:08
6. "Colour of Love" (Pop Mix) — 3:30
- CD single, Europe & UK (1996)
1. "Colour of Love" (Colourful Radio Edit) — 3:36
2. "Colour of Love" (Pop Mix) — 3:30
- CD single, US (1996)
1. "Colour of Love" (Pop Mix) — 3:30
2. "Colour of Love" (Colourful Radio Edit) — 4:08
- CD maxi, US (1996)
1. "Colour of Love" (Berman 12" Mix) — 6:39
2. "Colour of Love" (Spike Club Mix) — 8:27
3. "Colour of Love" (Cibola Mix) — 7:00
4. "Colour of Love" (Original Edit) — 3:30
5. "Colour of Love" (Spike Dub Mix) — 7:40
6. "This Is Your Night" (Mousse T Remix) — 6:35

== Charts ==
Chart (1996–97)	Peak position
Australia (ARIA)	66
Canada Dance/Urban (RPM)	5
Iceland (Íslenski Listinn Topp 40)	38
Israel (Israeli Singles Chart)	12
New Zealand (Recorded Music NZ)	31
US Billboard Hot 100	74
US Hot Dance Club Play (Billboard)	5

"Colour of Love (Remixes)"

Single by Amber
- Released: September 2022
- Label: Tommy Boy Records (Reservoir Media)
- Songwriters: Marie- Claire Cremers (Amber); Christian Berman

Amber singles chronology
"Love One Another (Remixes)" (August, 2022)	"Colour of Love (Remixes)" (2022)	"This is Your Night (Special Edition)" (June, 2023)

== Colour of Love (Remixes) (2022) ==
In September 2022, Tommy Boy Records (Reservoir Media) released 10 vault remixes of "Colour of Love". Many of the club mixes became available on digital streaming and download platforms for the very first time with this release.

This maxi single was the 5th in an ongoing series of planned reissues of Amber catalog remixes that have been vaulted for decades. "Colour of Love (Remixes)" was preceded by "Sexual (Li Da Di) [Plasma Trance Remix - Extended]" (May 2022), "The Hits Remixed - Extended" (June 2022), "Above the Clouds (Remixes)" (July 2022), and "Love One Another (Remixes)" (August 2022). The digital album, which included DJ mixes by Spike, Mousse T & Borris Dlugosh, Cibola and, Jonathan Peters and Anthony Acid, peaked at #2 on the iTunes US Dance Albums Chart.

== Track listing ==
Colour of Love (Remixes) (2022)
No.	Title	Length
1.	"Colour of Love"	3:33
2.	"Colour of Love" (12" Remix)	6:41
3.	"Colour of Love" (Spike Club Mix)	8:30
4.	"Colour of Love" (Spike Dub Mix)	7:43
5.	"Colour of Love" (Mousse T & Borris Dlugosh Remix [Extended])	6:08
6.	"Colour of Love" (Mousse T & Borris Dlugosh Colourful Radio Edit)	4:02
7.	"Colour of Love" (Cibola Mix)	7:03
8.	"Colour of Love" (Cibola Radio Mix)	4:02
9.	"Colour of Love" (House Mix)	3:34
10.	"Colour of Love" (Jonathan Peters and Anthony Acid Trenergy Hard Mix)	7:06

"Colour of Love, Part II (Bonus Remixes)"

Single by Amber
- Released: September 2023
- Label: Tommy Boy Records (Reservoir Media)
- Songwriters: Marie- Claire Cremers (Amber); Christian Berman

Amber singles chronology
"Being With You (Remixes)" (August, 2023)	"Colour of Love, Part II (Bonus Remixes)" (2023)	"One More Night (Remixes)" (October, 2023)

== Colour of Love Part II (Bonus Remixes) (2023) ==
In September 2023, Tommy Boy Records (Reservoir Media) released 7 additional vault remixes of "Colour of Love".

== Track listing ==
Colour of Love, Part II (Bonus Remixes) (2023)
No.	Title	Length
1.	"Colour of Love"	3:33
2.	"Colour of Love" (AJ Trenegry Vocal Mix)	7:52
3.	"Colour of Love" (Cibola Dub)	7:00
4.	"Colour of Love" (Path of Dub)	6:59
5.	"Colour of Love" (Colour of Bass Mix)	7:45
6.	"Colour of Love" (Work It DJ - I Do - Bonus Beat)	3:27
