= Live at Yankee Stadium =

Live album by The Isley Brothers
- Released: October 1969
- Recorded: 1969
- Venue: Yankee Stadium, New York City
- Genre: Funk; soul; rhythm and blues; gospel
- Label: T-Neck Records
- Producer: The Isley Brothers

The Isley Brothers chronology
The Brothers: Isley (1969)	Live at Yankee Stadium (1969)	Get Into Something (1970)

Professional ratings
Review scores
Source	Rating
AllMusic	3/5 stars

Live at Yankee Stadium is a 1969 live album by The Isley Brothers, released on their own T-Neck label. While the Isleys appear in this live album, it is actually a live showcase by the group to conjoin artists that signed to their T-Neck label and Buddah Records-associated acts including Judy White, the girl group Sweet Cherries, the gospel group The Edwin Hawkins Singers and the family soul group the Five Stairsteps. All the guest artists except for the Edwin Hawkins Singers sang songs that were written and produced for them by the Isleys. The Isleys performed their then-current hits "It's Your Thing", "I Turned You On" and the 1959 classic, "Shout", bringing in audience members alongside them as they ended the performance.

== Background and concept ==
The Yankee Stadium concert was organized by The Isley Brothers and was intended to be a showcase for their T-Neck label roster. Rather than a single-artist concert, the event functioned as a label-driven collection of soul, gospel, and R&B performers associated with or distributed through T-Neck and its partners.

Music historians later described the concert as an early example of a multi-artist soul revue presented in a major sports stadium, combining performance and label promotion in a single event.

== Release and reception ==
The album peaked at No. 34 on the Billboard Soul LPs chart in December 1969. It was remastered and expanded for inclusion in the 2015 released CD box set The RCA Victor & T-Neck Album Masters, 1959-1983. The expanded CD only features additional performances by The Brooklyn Bridge, there are no additional Isley Brothers tracks.

Live at Yankee Stadium was independently filmed and was funded by the Isley Brothers. It was released in theaters as It's Your Thing in August 1970.

== Track listing ==
Side A
No.	Title	Performed by	Length
1.	"I Know Who You Been Socking It To"	The Isley Brothers
2.	"I Turned You On"	The Isley Brothers
3.	"It's Your Thing"	The Isley Brothers
4.	"Shout"	The Isley Brothers

Side B
No.	Title	Performed by	Length
1.	"Jesus Lover of My Soul"	The Edwin Hawkins Singers
2.	"Joy, Joy"	The Edwin Hawkins Singers
3.	"Oh Happy Day"	The Edwin Hawkins Singers

Side C
No.	Title	Performed by	Length
1.	"People Get Ready"	The Brooklyn Bridge
2.	"Talkin' About My Baby"	The Brooklyn Bridge
3.	"It's All Right"	The Brooklyn Bridge

Side D
No.	Title	Performed by	Length
1.	"Don't Change Your Love"	Five Stairsteps
2.	"Somebody's Been Messin'"	Judy White
3.	"Love Is What You Make It"	Sweet Cherries

=== Notes ===
The version of "It's Your Thing" heard here appears on the Isley Brothers' career-spanning 1999 boxed set It's Your Thing: The Story of the Isley Brothers, the liner notes to which say the concert took place on June 21, 1969.
