= The Body Remembers =

Studio album by Debbie Gibson
- Released: August 20, 2021
- Studio: Electric Youth Studios; Germano Studios; The Hit Factory; Double Forte Music
- Genre: Pop; dance-pop
- Length: 55:09
- Label: StarGirl
- Producer: Debbie Gibson; Sean Thomas; Tracy Young; John Sinclaire; Phillip Thorpe; Fred Coury; Dirty Werk; Elliott Mitchell

Debbie Gibson chronology
We Could Be Together (2017)	The Body Remembers (2021)	Winterlicious (2022)

Singles from The Body Remembers
- 1. "Girls Night Out" Released: June 7, 2019; 2. "Lost in Your Eyes, the Duet" Released: June 4, 2021; 3. "One Step Closer" Released: July 16, 2021; 4. "Me Not Loving You" Released: May 6, 2022; 5. "Love Don’t Care" Released: June 9, 2023; 6. "Legendary" Released: August 29, 2025

The Body Remembers is the tenth studio album by American singer-songwriter Debbie Gibson, released on August 20, 2021, independently by her own label StarGirl Records. It is her first studio release to feature completely original songs since her seventh studio album M.Y.O.B. (2001).

The Body Remembers charted at number 86 on the US Billboard Top Album Sales chart. In the UK, the album charted at number 27 on the UK Independent Albums Chart, number 64 on the UK Album Downloads Chart, and number 93 on the Scottish Albums Charts. It was Gibson's first charting album in both the US and the UK since the 1990s.

== Background ==
Gibson announced the release of the album on June 4, 2021. In an interview with Billboard magazine, she stated, "This album very much feels like Electric Youth 2021 in a lot of ways." Gibson also said, "The variety of styles, the way it encapsulates my life right now -- I really wanted to let it hang out on this album. The goal was to make an undeniably special, authentic, well-crafted and yet still raw album. I feel great about the fact we found that. I feel like I've made an undeniable album."

Gibson came up with the album title while writing the songs during the COVID-19 pandemic lockdown. "I was writing both upbeats and ballads, but I was gravitating toward the upbeats just because everybody needs that energy shift now. Pop music does that — it shifts energy. That's where the title comes from — the body remembers all the visceral moments tied to your favorite pop songs." The song "Legendary" was written in memory of Kobe Bryant. Gibson describes "One Step Closer" as a "throwback style of Dua Lipa and Kylie Minogue." "Strings" focuses on "putting self-love above everything."

Among the album's 15 tracks is "Lost in Your Eyes, the Duet" a new recording of Gibson's 1989 hit single with Joey McIntyre. The duo first performed the song together during New Kids on the Block's Mixtape Tour in 2019. The single was released on streaming services on June 4 while the official music video was uploaded on Gibson's YouTube channel on July 1. On July 12, Gibson announced "One Step Closer" as the album's second single. The official track listing was revealed on July 16.

== Singles ==
"Girls Night Out" peaked at number 4 on Billboard's Dance Club Songs chart in 2020, becoming Gibson's first US top-five dance single since "Electric Youth". "One Step Closer" reached number 3 on the Swiss Dance Chart Top 100 in 2022, making it her first international top-five single since "Lost in Your Eyes".

== Critical reception ==
The album received favorable reviews. The Houston Chronicle listed the album among the best of 2021, noting that "Gibson embraces adulthood but acknowledges the fizzy pop that made her a teen star" and that the title track "deserves to be a huge radio hit." Popdose also had the album listed as one of the best of 2021, singling out the title track as "glorious". NPR Music noted that the album is "filled with optimism, with joy. It's got bounce. It's got light." Retro Pop Magazine gave the album four and a half stars, praising it "as close to a perfect pop record as we’ve heard in a long time." They also commended Gibson for "knocking out chart-friendly hooks for a sound that’s both current and classic." Times Square Chronicles noted that "lyrically, Gibson’s never been better" and that "it’s a powerhouse of an album." In their review of the album, V13media stated that Gibson "reveals her ever-maturing artistry, while maintaining a youthful freshness" and that the album was "pretty darn fabulous.". In their review, Out Now magazine noted the album is "filled with a mix of modern pop hooks and upbeat club bangers" and "showcases the timeless elegance and universality" of Gibson's songwriting.

== Track listing ==
All tracks are written by Debbie Gibson, except where indicated. All tracks are produced by Debbie Gibson and Sean Thomas, except where indicated.

No.	Title	Writer(s)	Producer(s)	Length
1.	"One Step Closer"	Gibson; Tracy Young	Gibson; Sean Thomas; Young	3:22
2.	"Runway"	Gibson; Thomas		3:33
3.	"Love Don't Care"	Gibson; Lars Havor Nelson; Young	Gibson; Thomas; Young	3:45
4.	"The Body Remembers"			4:03
5.	"Lost in Your Eyes, the Duet" (with Joey McIntyre)			3:39
6.	"Strings"		Gibson; John Sinclaire; Phillip Thorpe	3:55
7.	"Legendary"		Gibson; Thomas; Fred Coury	4:15
8.	"Freedom" (featuring DJ Ashba)	Gibson; Dirty Werk	Gibson; Thomas; Dirty Werk	3:19
9.	"Girls Night Out" (VegasVibe Remix)			4:24
10.	"Dance 4U"			3:19
11.	"What Are We Gonna Do?"			2:33
12.	"LuvU2Much"	Gibson; Coury	Gibson; Thomas; Coury	2:28
13.	"Red Carpet Ready"			4:05
14.	"Tell Me Love"	Gibson; Thomas; Elliott Mitchell	Gibson; Thomas; Mitchell	4:02
15.	"Me Not Loving You"			4:27
Total length:				55:09

== Personnel ==
- Debbie Gibson – lead vocals, backing vocals (1–4, 6–12, 14, 15), acoustic piano (7, 13, 15)
- Tracy Young – keyboards (1, 3, 9), programming (1, 3, 9)
- Sean Thomas – keyboards (2, 4, 5, 9–11, 13, 15), programming, (2, 4, 5, 9–11, 13, 15), additional keyboards (3, 7, 12), guitars (2, 4, 5, 11, 13), bass (2), backing vocals (4), acoustic guitar (8), acoustic piano (15)
- Eugene "Man Man" Roberts – additional keyboards (2)
- John Sinclaire – keyboards (6), programming (6), strings (6), string arrangements (6)
- Phillip Thorpe – keyboards (6), programming (6)
- Fred Coury – keyboards (7, 12), programming (7, 12), drums (7, 12), guitars (12)
- Dirty Werk – keyboards (8), programming (8)
- Elliott Mitchell – keyboards (14), programming (14), guitars (14)
- Ira Siegel – guitars (1, 4)
- Paul Sidoti – guitars (3, 11)
- DJ Ashba – guitars (7, 8, 11)
- Johannes Greer – percussion (3, 6, 7, 11)
- Joey Finger – snare drum solos (14)
- Philip Wigfall – alto saxophone (3)
- Eric Tewalt – tenor saxophone (3)
- Nathan Tanouye – trombone (3)
- Dan Falcone – trumpet (3)
- Stevie Blacke – strings (7)
- Sylvia McCalla – backing vocals (1, 3, 8)
- Lyssa Lynn – backing vocals (3)
- Christine Shebeck – backing vocals (3)
- Joey McIntyre – lead vocals (5)
- Orfeh – backing vocals (7, 14)
- Andy Karl – backing vocals (7, 14)
- Jassen Allen – backing vocals (7, 15)
- Tymara Walker – backing vocals (7, 15)
- Serena Harris – backing vocals (7, 15)
- Lillian Caputo – backing vocals (11)
- Jackie Romero – backing vocals (14)

== Charts ==
Chart performance for The Body Remembers
Chart (2021)	Peak position
Scottish Albums (OCC)	93
UK Album Downloads (OCC)	64
UK Independent Albums (OCC)	27
US Top Album Sales (Billboard)	86
