= Berman Brothers =

Berman Brothers may refer to:

- Berman Brothers (painters), siblings Eugène and Leonid Berman, Russian Neo-romantic painters and theater and opera designers
- Berman Brothers (producers), siblings Frank and Christian Berman, German record producers and songwriters
