= The Brothers: Isley =

Studio album by the Isley Brothers
- Released: October 18, 1969
- Studio: A&R (New York City)
- Genres: Funk; soul
- Length: 30:36
- Label: T-Neck/Buddah
- Producer: The Isley Brothers

The Isley Brothers chronology
It's Our Thing (1969)	The Brothers: Isley (1969)	Live at Yankee Stadium (1969)

Singles from The Brothers: Isley
- 1. "I Turned You On" Released: May 26, 1969

Professional ratings
Review scores
Source	Rating
AllMusic	4/5 stars
Uncut	4/5 stars

The Brothers: Isley is the seventh album released by the Isley Brothers on their own T-Neck label on October 18, 1969. After years with other labels and fresh off the success of the It's Our Thing (1969) album, which included the hit title track, "It's Your Thing", the Isley Brothers celebrated their newfound independence by releasing another new album that year with this LP. The album yielded the Billboard Top 40 pop hit, "I Turned You On" and subsequent charters, "Was It Good to You?" and "Black Berries". It was also their second full venture into funk music, a genre they would dominate in the coming years. The album was remastered and expanded for inclusion in the 2015 released CD box set The RCA Victor & T-Neck Album Masters (1959–1983).

== Track listing ==
All tracks are written by Rudolph Isley, O'Kelly Isley and Ronald Isley, except where noted.

Side one
No.	Title	Writer(s)	Length
1.	"I Turned You On"		2:34
2.	"Vacuum Cleaner"		2:50
3.	"I Got to Get Myself Together"	Rudolph Isley, O'Kelly Isley, Ronald Isley, George Patterson	3:31
4.	"Was It Good to You?"		2:40
5.	"The Blacker the Berrie"		5:50

Side two
No.	Title	Length
1.	"My Little Girl"	3:38
2.	"Get Down off of the Train"	3:11
3.	"Holding On"	2:32
4.	"Feels Like the World"	3:21

== Personnel ==
The Isley Brothers

- Ronald Isley – lead vocals
- O'Kelly Isley, Jr. – backing vocals; co-lead vocals on "Black Berries"
- Rudolph Isley – backing vocals; lead vocals on "I Got to Get Myself Together"
- Ernie Isley – guitars, drums
- Chris Jasper, Everett Collins – piano, keyboards
- Marvin Isley – bass

with

- Other instrumentation by assorted New York City musicians

Technical

- Tony May – engineer
