= AmeriCuba =

Compilation album by Havana Maestros
- Released: May 26, 2017
- Recorded: 2016–2017
- Genre: Salsa, Mambo, Son, Bolero, Tropical, Latin,
- Label: Warner Music
- Producer: Berman Brothers

Havana Maestros – AmeriCuba is a collaborative album by Havana Maestros, which fuses a cast of Cuban musicians including Barbarito Torres and Amadito Valdes of the Buena Vista Social Club, with tracks from American artists such as Missy Elliott, Janelle Monáe, Jason Derulo, Ben E. King, Fun., Otis Redding, Chic, Dionne Warwick, B.o.B. and others. With Major Lazer they recorded a bonus track, a Cuban version of the song "Lean On", which is only available as an online download. The album was produced by the Berman Brothers.

== Track listing ==
1. "Good Times" – Chic
2. "Whatcha Say" – Jason Derulo
3. "Stand By Me" – Ben E. King
4. "Get Ur Freak On" – Missy Elliott
5. "We Are Young" – Fun
6. "(Sittin' On) The Dock of the Bay" – Otis Redding
7. "Ritmo Cubano" – Havana Maestros
8. "I Say a Little Prayer" – Dionne Warwick
9. "Airplanes" – B.o.B and Hayley Williams
10. "Tightrope" – Janelle Monáe
11. "Fly" – Sugar Ray
12. "Ven" – Havana Maestros
13. "A Mi Manera" – Havana Maestros

Online bonus track

1. "Lean On" – Major Lazer
