= The Child (Inside) =

Single by Qkumba Zoo

from the album Wake Up & Dream
- Released: 1996
- Genre: hi-NRG; house
- Length: 3:58
- Label: Arista Records; Mega Records
- Songwriters: Levannah; Owl
- Producers: Allan Goldswain; Brian O'Shey

Qkumba Zoo singles chronology
"The Child (Inside)" (1996)	"I'm Scared, You're Scared {Cloud Eyes" (1997)

Music video
- "The Child (Inside)" on YouTube

"The Child (Inside)" is a song by South African trio Qkumba Zoo, released in August 1995 by Arista and Mega Records as their first single from the international debut album, Wake Up and Dream (1996). The song shot straight to the top of the charts in South Africa, earning them the Best New Band award at the 1996 South African Music Awards. Same year, it was a hit in the US, reaching number 69 on the Billboard Hot 100 as well as peaking at number-one on the Billboard Hot Dance Club Songs chart. The trio was the first South African group to top a Billboard chart in over 17 years. The track also peaked at number 34 on the Radio & Records contemporary hit radio chart on October 18, 1996. The 1996 release of "The Child (Inside)" featured several mixes by DJ Junior Vasquez, that became the standard for the song in American clubs. In recent years, the original mix has been used in several US television commercials, the most popular being for Seaworld and Carnival Cruise Lines.

== Critical reception ==
In Billboard magazine's review of the single, Larry Flick wrote, "The Euro-NRG sound that has propelled dance music back into pop radio prominence has been in need of a little variation and development. This intriguing new act successfully accomplishes the task without tampering too much with the genre's tried-and-true formula. Typically bright and springy beats underline a contagious melody that is executed with whooping tribal chants and quirky female vocals." In his Dance Trax column, Flick praised it as "an intriguing ditty that combines shiny hi-NRG elements with tribal chants and female warbling that land somewhere between Bjork and Enya. [...] We're betting that this cutie will enjoy the same success as multiformat home runs by Real McCoy and Robert Miles."

Paul Sexton from pan-European magazine Music & Media named it Single of the Week, noting that South African trio QKumba Zoo "have already made more impression on the U.S. market with this single than any of their compatriots have since the heady days of Clout's 'Substitute'. Signed to Arista by Clive Davis, their sound straddles the ethnic and CHR camps in persuasive style, landing somewhere between Johnny Clegg and current European synth pop, reflecting female lead singer Levannah's upbringing in the Zulu homeland of Natal." A reviewer from Music Week gave the song a score of four out of five, adding, "Imagine Gina G embracing African rhythms and you have some idea of Qkumba Zoo. A hypnotically catchy debut single."

== Music video ==
The accompanying music video for "The Child (Inside)" was directed by Ruvén Afanador. It takes place in a large, sepia-coloured room, where singer Levannah and musician Owl are performing. She wears a burgundy dress and dark lipstick, and has a punk hairstyle. Owl, with tribal bodypaint, plays several instruments, such as a drum. In some scenes, Levannah performs while standing in a corner of the room, on a tall glass column. In other scenes, she dances or acts while looking through what appears to be a large framed magnifying glass. She also occasionally wears body paint or stands behind various light tubes that are shaped like a spiral or heart rates.

== Track listing ==
- CD maxi, South Africa (1995)
1. "The Child (Inside)" (Radio Zoo Mix) – 3:48
2. "The Child (Inside)" (Qcumba Dance Edit) – 4:54
3. "The Child (Inside)" (Kalahari Trance Magick Mix) – 7:43
4. "The Child (Inside)" (The Ostrich & The Eland Mix) – 3:55
5. "The Child (Inside)" (Lizards-Love-A-Hot-Rock Mix) – 3:37
6. "The Child (Inside)" (Mantis Mantra) (Instrumental Mix) – 4:10
- CD single, Europe (1996)
1. "The Child (Inside)" (Radio Mix) – 3:58
2. "The Child (Inside)" (Berman Brothers Remix Edit) – 3:58
3. Wake Up & Dream (Album Snippets) – 4:40
- CD maxi, Scandinavia (1996)
1. "The Child (Inside)" (Radio Mix) – 3:58
2. "The Child (Inside)" (Extended Album Mix) – 4:54
3. "The Child (Inside)" (Junior's Club Mix) – 8:48
4. "The Child (Inside)" (Berman Brothers Club Mix) – 6:39
5. "The Child (Inside)" (Anthony Acid's Up-Lift Mix) – 8:40
- CD single, Australia (1996)
1. "The Child (Inside)" (Radio Mix) – 3:58
2. "The Child (Inside)" (Berman Brothers Remix Edit) – 3:58
3. Wake Up & Dream (Album Snippets) – 4:40

== Charts ==
Chart (1995–1996)	Peak position
Quebec (ADISQ)	41
South Africa (South African Singles Chart)	1
UK Pop Tip Club Chart (Music Week)	14
US Billboard Hot 100	69
US Dance Club Songs (Billboard)	1
US Cash Box Top 100	56
US Contemporary Hit Radio (Radio & Records)	34
