= This Is Your Night =

This Is Your Night may refer to:

- This Is Your Night (album), a 1996 album by Amber
- "This Is Your Night" (Amber song), 1996
- "This Is Your Night" (Heavy D & the Boyz song), 1994
