= Qkumba Zoo =

Dance duo from South Africa

- Also known as: Innaskinz, QZoo, Qcumba Zoo
- Origin: Johannesburg, South Africa
- Genres: Electronic, House, South African, Dance
- Years active: 1995–2013
- Label: Arista/BMG Records
- Members: Levannah, Owl
- Past members: Tziki
- Website: qkumbazoo.co.za

Qkumba Zoo is a South African dance music duo from Johannesburg, South Africa, consisting of vocalist Levannah and musician/producer Owl. The band was originally formed by Owl and Levannah as a duo called Ocean Road.

In 1996 the band was a trio and consisted of Owl, Levannah, and dancer/sculptor Tziki. The band's 1996 song "The Child (Inside)" was a hit in the United States, reaching number 69 on the Billboard Hot 100 and number one on the Billboard Dance Club Songs chart.

== BIG ==
Qkumba Zoo's first release was in 1995 titled BIG, and it was released in South Africa on Gresham Records. At the time, the band's name was spelled 'Qcumba Zoo', and even Tziki's name was the elongated 'Tsatsiki'. The booklet contained a colourful, busy design, featuring original artwork from Tziki, and pictures from Qcumba's stage shows. The title track on BIG has slightly different music and vocals from its subsequent release on Wake Up & Dream, and "The Child (Inside)" has a fading outro.

Track listing
1. Rain (3:58)
2. Happy Earthday (3:42)
3. The Child (Inside) (3:27)
4. Cloud Eyes (I'm Scared, You're Scared) (4:28)
5. Flesh & Blood (4:04)
6. Big (3:48)
7. Into The Night (5:04)
8. Mermaids (4:45)
9. Time of Wonder (5:18)
11. Big – Mothership (4:15)

== Wake Up and Dream ==
Qkumba Zoo's international debut, Wake Up & Dream, was released on Arista Records in 1996. As Levannah said, "We wanted to form something that could be part of the global village. And, at the same time, have it be tied to its birthplace."

Track listing
1. Rain (3:45)
2. The Child (Inside) (3:58)
3. Cloud Eyes (I'm Scared, You're Scared) (4:32)
4. Flesh & Blood (4:03)
5. Big (3:48)
6. Into The Night (5:04)
7. Weeping (5:06)
8. Mermaids (4:46)
9. Happy Earthday (3:42)
10. Time of Wonder (5:14)
11. Big Mothership (4:04)

Their first single, "The Child (Inside)," produced by the Berman Brothers, hit No. 1 on the US Hot Dance Music/Club Play chart in 1996, and No. 69 on the Billboard Hot 100. It peaked on the Radio & Records contemporary hit radio charts at No. 34 on October 16, 1996. They were the first South African group to place a single within the Billboard Hot 100 Singles chart in over 17 years.

The 1996 Arista release of "The Child (Inside)" featured several mixes by DJ Junior Vasquez that became the standard for the song in American clubs. Vasquez followed up with several mixes of "Cloud Eyes (I'm Scared You're Scared)". In recent years, the original mix of "The Child (Inside)" has been used in several US television commercials, the most popular being from Seaworld parks and Carnival Cruise Lines.

The track "Weeping" was added to this release, the a cover of an anti-apartheid song by Bright Blue, another South African band. Bonus tracks are also provided on this album, including a musical remix of "Mermaids" and two stories/poems narrated by Levannah.

In August 1996, the group were the opening act for Danish singer Whigfield when she performed at the University of Port Elizabeth indoor sports centre.

== Butterfly Peepl ==
Several years after the release of the debut album, band member Tziki committed suicide in 1999. This was one of the catalysts that changed Owl and Levannah, which can be heard in the music of their second album, Butterfly Peepl, released in 2000. In addition to the album's release, the band's name was officially shortened from Qkumba Zoo to QZoo. The group also left Arista Records in favour of their own independent label, Zoocumba Music. The Butterfly Peepl release did not gain much attention, only having been for sale for a short time on QZoo's official site and released only in South Africa.

Track listing
1. Beautiful (4:28)
2. Torn Between You and the Sky (7:01)
3. Invisible (3:55)
4. Slap Bang (4:00)
5. Virgin (4:28)
6. Wonder Woman (4:54)
7. DNA (4:51)
8. Butterfly People (4:03)
9. Let the Light In (4:50)
10. Words (6:41)
11. In The Moon (2:57)

== Other releases ==
While on the Arista label, many singles/samplers were released on CD, cassette, and vinyl:

CD Sampler (1996)
1. The Child (Inside) (4:01)
2. Weeping (4:50)
3. Flesh & Blood (4:04)
4. Cloud Eyes (I'm Scared, You're Scared) (4:56)

The Child (Inside) – Promo CD (1996)
1. The Child (Inside) (4:01)

The Child (Inside) – CD/Cassette (1996)
1. The Child (Inside) – Radio Mix (3:58)
2. The Child (Inside) – Berman Bros. Remix Edit (3:58)
3. Wake Up & Dream (Album Snippets) – Weeping & Flesh and Blood & Big (4:40)

The Child (Inside) Remixes – CD (1996)
1. Extended Album Mix (4:54)
2. Junior's Club Mix (8:47)
3. Berman Brothers Club Mix (6:40)
4. Anthony Acid's Up-Lift Mix (8:41)
5. Toxic Twins Solid Waste Dub (6:13)

The Child (Inside) Remixes – US 2 x 12" Vinyl (1996)
Side A: Junior's Club Mix (8:48), Anthony Acid's Hard Drum Mix (3:52)
Side B: Berman Brothers Club Mix (6:39), Toxic Twins New Energy Dub (7:24)
Side C: Anthony Acid's Up-Lifted Mix (8:40), Junior's Piano Dub (5:03)
Side D: Extended Album Mix (5:45), Berman Bros Dub Mix (6:56)

The Child (Inside) Remixes – UK Promo Vinyl (1996)
Side A: Junior's Club Mix (8:45), Anthony Acid's Hard Drum Mix (3:50)
Side B: The Child (Inside) (Junior's X-Beat Dub) (8:04), Anthony Acid's Up-Lifted Mix (8:40)

Enhanced CD Bio (1996)
1. Multimedia Presentation
2. The Child (Inside) (4:01)
3. Weeping (4:50)
4. Flesh and Blood (4:04)
5. Cloud Eyes (I'm Scared, You're Scared) (4:56)

The Enhanced CD Bio contained an interactive track that could be played on the computer, providing a band bio, interview clips, recipes, games, and videos.

I'm Scared, You're Scared {Cloud Eyes} – CD (1997)
1. Radio Mix (3:47)
2. Album Version {Edit} (4:02)
3. Dance Radio Mix (3:28)

I'm Scared, You're Scared {Cloud Eyes} – US Promo Vinyl ADP-3303 (1997)
Side A: Murk Big Time Club Mix (10:05), Murk Radio Mix (3:30)
Side B: Murk Big Fat Dub (7:43), Murk Green Dub (7:37)

I'm Scared, You're Scared {Cloud Eyes} – US Promo Vinyl ADP-3377 (1997)
Side A: Junior's Main Club Mix (9:03), Tribal Beats (5:39)
Side B: Junior's Vocal Dub (6:00), Main Dub (7:18)

I'm Scared, You're Scared {Cloud Eyes} (Dance Mixes) – US Commercial Vinyl 07822-13384-1 (1997)
Side A: Junior's Club Mix (9:11), Tribal Beats (5:42)
Side B: Murk Club Mix (10:05), Murk Radio Mix (3:30)

5FM presents The Santa Sessions (2002)
This CD was released by the South African radio station 5FM, and contains Christmas songs covered by South African bands. QZoo is featured on track 14 covering "O Holy Night."

SA All Stars - Elephant Song (1999)
Qkumba Zoo performed on this cd single which benefited Tuli Elephant Trust Fund. Label is Gallo Record Company.

== N3X+ ==
In 2001, after their official domain had disappeared, QZoo popped up on a new website under the name "Innaskinz". The band still consisted of Owl and Levannah, who were now paired with a woman named Cajun. Lyrics for a new song, "Strike Out Against the Tide", appeared on the main page for a brief while, but soon the site disappeared.

Eventually, Owl resurfaced online and made it clear that he had not stopped making music, whether solo or paired with Levannah's voice. Tracks like "Vision Afrika 2000", "These Visions", "Spider Girl", and "My Shepherd" appeared for fans to stream/download.

In 2009, Qkumba Zoo released a new EP called N3X+, available for download on Rhythm Music Store's website.

=== Track listing ===
1. Earthbound
2. Torn Between You and the Sky
3. Strike Out Against the Tide
4. Karmic Book
5. Let the Light in

Tracks 2 and 5, while previously released on Butterfly Peepl, were remastered for N3X+. "Earthbound" was a song originally written while the band was still known as Ocean Road. Between Owl's solo work and N3X+, there is an apparent musical change from previous albums, which is now heading in the direction of traditional folk while continuing to integrate electronic/tribal sounds.

In late 2009, another official Qkumba Zoo site opened at Qkumbazoo.co.za, which contains a blog and other band info.

== Letthelightin ==
In July 2011, Qkumba Zoo released an album with Souvenir Records called Letthelightin. The album contains re-mastered songs from their previous album Butterfly Peepl and songs from the N3X+ EP.

== 2013-2022 ==
On 11 March 2013, it was announced that Qkumba Zoo was officially a side project, and Owl joined with Simone to create Owl and Simone.

In 2014 Qkumba Zoo's "The Child Inside" was listed as no. 60 on Sunday Times' "100 Greatest South African Songs".

In February 2019 Qkumba Zoo released the single "Unicorns".
