= If You Could Read My Mind =

1970 single by Gordon Lightfoot

- Side A of the Canadian single

Single by Gordon Lightfoot

from the album Sit Down Young Stranger
- B-side: "Poor Little Allison"
- Released: December 1970
- Studio: SunWest (Hollywood, California)
- Length: 3:48
- Label: Reprise
- Songwriter: Gordon Lightfoot
- Producers: Lenny Waronker and Joseph Wissert

Gordon Lightfoot singles chronology
"Approaching Lavender" (1970)	"If You Could Read My Mind" (1970)	"This Is My Song" (1971)

Audio video
- "If You Could Read My Mind" on YouTube

"If You Could Read My Mind" is a song by Canadian singer-songwriter Gordon Lightfoot. Lightfoot wrote the lyrics while he was reflecting on his own divorce. It reached number one on the Canadian Singles Chart on commercial release in 1970 and charted in several other countries on international release in 1971.

== Theme ==
Lightfoot cited his divorce for inspiring the lyrics, which came to him as he was sitting in a vacant Toronto house one summer. The song compares events in his relationship to a ghost movie and a paperback romance novel. The lyrics include the words: "I don't know where we went wrong. But the feeling's gone and I just can't get it back."

At the request of his daughter Ingrid, he performed the lyrics live with a slight change: the line "I'm just trying to understand the feelings that you lack" is altered to "I'm just trying to understand the feelings that we lack." Lightfoot said in an interview that the difficulty with writing songs inspired by personal stories is that there is not always the emotional distance and clarity to make lyrical improvements such as the one his daughter suggested.

== Production ==
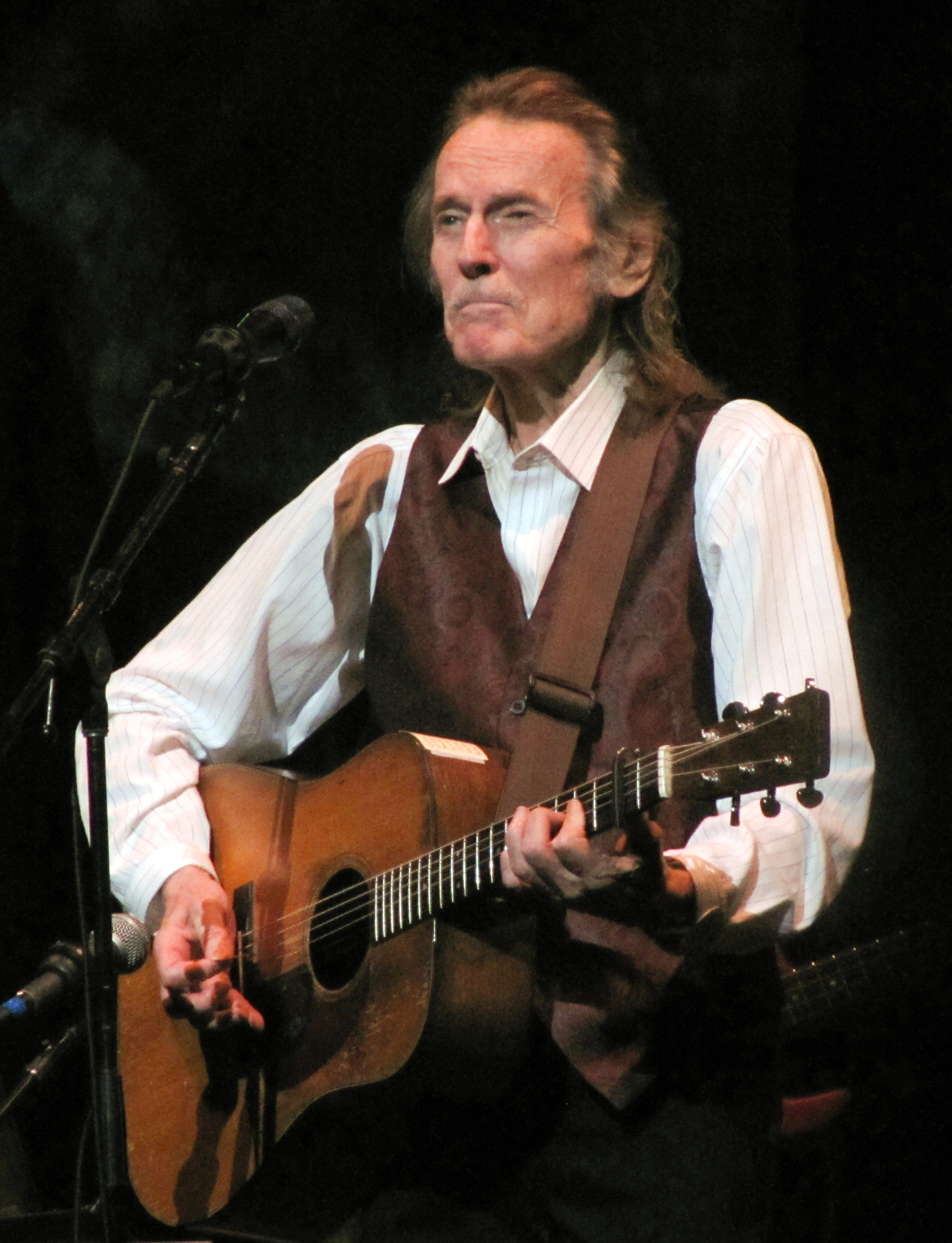
Gordon Lightfoot (pictured in 2009) wrote and originally recorded the song.

The song was produced by Lenny Waronker and Joe Wissert at Sunwest Recording Studios in Los Angeles, California, with strings arranged by Nick DeCaro.

== Composition ==
The song is in A major and uses the subtonic chord. According to Duran Duran lead singer Simon Le Bon, the chorus of their song "Save a Prayer" was based on "If You Could Read My Mind".

== Personnel ==
- Gordon Lightfoot – vocals and acoustic rhythm guitar
- Red Shea – acoustic lead guitar
- Rick Haynes – bass guitar
- Nick DeCaro – string arrangements

== Format releases ==
This song first appeared on Lightfoot's 1970 album Sit Down Young Stranger, later renamed If You Could Read My Mind following the song's success.

== Chart performance ==
On release, the song reached number one on the Canadian Singles Chart and was his first recording to appear in the U.S., reaching number five on the Billboard Hot 100 singles chart in February 1971. Later in the year, it reached number 27 on the Australian singles chart and number 30 on the United Kingdom's singles chart. The song also reached number one for one week on the Billboard Easy Listening chart, and was the first of four Lightfoot releases to reach the top position on that chart.

== Rights infringement legal action ==
In 1987, Lightfoot filed a lawsuit against Michael Masser, the composer of George Benson's single "The Greatest Love of All", covered by Whitney Houston in 1985, alleging plagiarism of 24 bars of "If You Could Read My Mind"; the transitional section that begins "I decided long ago never to walk in anyone's shadow" of the Masser song has the same melody as "I never thought I could act this way and I got to say that I just don't get it; I don't know where we went wrong but the feeling's gone and I just can't get it back" of Lightfoot's song.

Lightfoot stated that he dropped the lawsuit when he felt it was having a negative effect on the singer Houston because the lawsuit was about the writer and not her. He also said that he did not want people to think that he had stolen his melody from Masser. The case was settled out of court, and Masser issued a public apology.

== Charts ==
=== Weekly charts ===
Weekly chart performance for "If You Could Read My Mind"
Chart (1970–1971)	Peak position
Australia (Go-Set)	28
Australia (Kent Music Report)	27
Canada Top Singles (RPM)	1
Canada Adult Contemporary (RPM)	1
New Zealand (Recorded Music NZ)	19
UK Singles (Official Charts)	30
US Billboard Hot 100	5
US Adult Contemporary (Billboard)	1

2023 weekly chart performance for "If You Could Read My Mind"
Chart (2023)	Peak position
US Hot Rock & Alternative Songs (Billboard)	17

=== Year-end charts ===
Year-end chart performance for "If You Could Read My Mind"
Chart (1971)	Rank
Canada Top Singles (RPM)	17
US Billboard Hot 100	38

== Certifications ==
Certifications for "If You Could Read My Mind"
Region	Certification	Certified units/sales
United Kingdom (BPI)	Gold	400,000^{‡}
^{‡} Sales+streaming figures based on certification alone.

== Stars on 54 version ==
"If You Could Read My Mind"

Single by Stars on 54

from the album 54: Music from the Miramax Motion Picture, Volume 2
- Released: 1998
- Length: 3:26
- Label: Tommy Boy Music
- Songwriter: Gordon Lightfoot
- Producer: The Berman Brothers

Amber singles chronology
"One More Night" (1997)	"If You Could Read My Mind" (1998)	"Sexual (Li Da Di)" (1999)

Jocelyn Enriquez singles chronology
"Get Into the Rhythm" (1998)	"If You Could Read My Mind" (1998)	"When I Get Close to You" (2000)

Ultra Naté singles chronology
"Release the Pressure" (1997)	"If You Could Read My Mind" (1998)	"Desire" (2000)

Music video
- "If You Could Read My Mind" on YouTube

House music collective Stars on 54—consisting of Amber, Jocelyn Enriquez and Ultra Naté—recorded a version of the song for the 1998 film 54, reaching No. 3 on Australia's ARIA Singles Chart and Canada's RPM 100 Hit Tracks chart, as well as No. 6 in New Zealand and No. 10 in Spain. Australian music channel Max included this version of "If You Could Read My Mind" in its list of the "1000 Greatest Songs of All Time" in 2012.

"Our favourite production during the '90s was the song "If You Could Read My Mind" by the group Stars on 54. (...) It featured Ultra Nate (to date, our favourite female singer), as well as Amber and Jocelyn Enriquez. Except for the short (but intense) "discussion" between the three performers about who would get the first verse, it was an amazing session. In the end, the film company Miramax re-shot the conclusion of the movie and had the group perform the track. That's how much they loved the song."

— Producers the Berman Brothers talking about the song.

=== Critical reception ===
Can't Stop the Pop called "If You Could Read My Mind" "one of the most mind-bogglingly brilliant cover versions of the ‘90s", adding that it "remains a deeply fabulous single" and "a proudly ‘90s homage to disco that is as uplifting and joyous as there could be – and can now be rightly enjoyed as a triumphant celebration of everything that 54 represents."

=== Music video ===
A music video was made to accompany the single release. It pays homage to aspects of the disco-era presented through a 1990s lens. Amber and Ultra Naté perform in a room where every surface is covered in LED dancefloor tiles. Jocelyn Enriquez is swinging on a giant disco ball. In the end, the singers performs together on the stage in a night club, all three dressed in red outfits. In between these scenes, several clips from the movie 54 are shown.

=== Track listings ===
UK 12-inch vinyl (1998)
No.	Title	Length
1.	"If You Could Read My Mind" (Hex Hector Club Mix)	9:30
2.	"If You Could Read My Mind" (original club mix)	6:11
3.	"If You Could Read My Mind" (Hex Hector Dub Mix)	7:00
4.	"If You Could Read My Mind" (The Shark Dub Mix)	8:00
Total length:		30:41

European CD single (1998)
No.	Title	Length
1.	"If You Could Read My Mind" (original edit)	3:27
2.	"If You Could Read My Mind" (Hex Hector Club Mix)	7:48
3.	"If You Could Read My Mind" (original club mix)	6:10
Total length:		17:25

US cassette single (1998)
No.	Title	Length
1.	"If You Could Read My Mind" (album version)
2.	"If You Could Read My Mind" (instrumental)

=== Charts ===
==== Weekly charts ====
Weekly chart performance for "If You Could Read My Mind"
Chart (1998–1999)	Peak position
Australia (ARIA)	3
Austria (Ö3 Austria Top 40)	17
Belgium (Ultratip Bubbling Under Flanders)	11
Canada Top Singles (RPM)	3
Canada Dance/Urban (RPM)	1
Europe (Eurochart Hot 100)	83
France (SNEP)	82
Germany (GfK)	65
Iceland (Íslenski Listinn Topp 40)	23
New Zealand (Recorded Music NZ)	6
Scottish Singles Sales (Official Charts)	25
Spain (Promusicae)	10
UK Singles (Official Charts)	23
UK Dance (Official Charts)	21
UK Indie (Official Charts)	5
US Billboard Hot 100	52
US Dance Club Songs (Billboard)	3
US Dance Singles Sales (Billboard)	3

==== Year-end charts ====
Year-end chart performance for "If You Could Read My Mind"
Chart (1998)	Position
Australia (ARIA)	24
Canada Top Singles (RPM)	48
Canada Dance (RPM)	1
US Dance Club Play (Billboard)	19
US Maxi-Singles Sales (Billboard)	16

=== Certifications ===
Certifications for "If You Could Read My Mind"
Region	Certification	Certified units/sales
Australia (ARIA)	Gold	35,000^{^}
^{^} Shipments figures based on certification alone.

== Stars on 54 version 25th Anniversary re-release (2023) ==
"If You Could Read My Mind (25th Anniversary Edition)"

Single by Stars on 54

from the album 54: Music from the Miramax Motion Picture, Volume 2
- Released: July 14, 2023
- Genre: Dance-pop
- Label: Tommy Boy (Reservoir Media)
- Songwriter: Gordon Lightfoot

Amber singles chronology
"This is Your Night (Special Edition)" (2023)	"If You Could Read My Mind (25th Anniversary Edition)" (2023)	"Being With You (Remixes)" (2023)

Music video
- "If You Could Read My Mind" on YouTube

On July 14, 2023, Tommy Boy Records (Reservoir Media) issued the 16-track digital album "If You Could Read My Mind (25th Anniversary Edition)" by Stars on 54 to celebrate the quarter-century anniversary of the original single. This marked the first time that many of the versions were made available on digital platforms.

=== Track listings ===
If You Could Read My Mind 25th Anniversary Edition (2023)
No.	Title	Length
1.	"If You Could Read My Mind"	3:27
2.	"If You Could Read My Mind" (Instrumental)	3:36
3.	"If You Could Read My Mind" (Original Club Mix)	6:09
4.	"If You Could Read My Mind" (Hex Hector Remix)	3:35
5.	"If You Could Read My Mind" (Hex Hector Remix - Extended)	9:33
6.	"If You Could Read My Mind" (Hex Hector Epic Piano Mix)	4:13
7.	"If You Could Read My Mind" (Hex Hector Dub Mix)	7:04
8.	"If You Could Read My Mind" (Hex Hector 12 Inch Raw Remix)	7:38
9.	"If You Could Read My Mind" (Hex Hector 12 Inch Raw Instrumental)	7:38
10.	"If You Could Read My Mind" (Silk's Uplifting Mix)	10:15
11.	"If You Could Read My Mind" (Silk's Uplifting Vocal)	9:22
12.	"If You Could Read My Mind" (Silk's Uplifting Reprise Version 1)	7:05
13.	"If You Could Read My Mind" (Silk's Uplifting Reprise Version 2)	7:44
14.	"If You Could Read My Mind" (Silk's House on 54 Mix)	9:45
15.	"If You Could Read My Mind" (Silk's House on 54 - Part 1 & 2)	13:37
16.	"If You Could Read My Mind" (Silk's Anthem Mix)	9:10

== Other notable cover versions ==
American singer Barbra Streisand covered the song on her 1971 album, Stoney End. A 1980 cover by Viola Wills peaked at No. 2 for five weeks on the dance/disco charts with a dance version of the song, at No. 80 in Australia, and at no. 28 in Spain. Duane Steele reached No. 32 on the Canadian country charts with his version in 1998. Johnny Cash also recorded a version of the song that was released posthumously on his 2006 album American V: A Hundred Highways, which topped the Billboard 200. Olivia Newton-John included her cover of the song in both her If Not for You and Let It Be Me albums.

== See also ==
- List of number-one adult contemporary singles of 1971 (U.S.)
