= This Is the Night =

This Is the Night may refer to:

== Film ==
- This Is the Night (1932 film), an American pre-Code comedy film, Cary Grant's feature film debut
- This Is the Night (2021 film), an American drama film

== Music ==
- "This Is the Night", a track on The The's 1993 album Dusk
- "This Is the Night" (Clay Aiken song), 2003
- "This Is the Night", a track by Jeri Lynne Fraser, on the 2007 compilation album Rebel Without a Cause
- "This Is the Night" (Kurt Calleja song), 2012

== See also ==
- This Is Your Night (disambiguation)
