= Tracy Young =

American electronic music producer

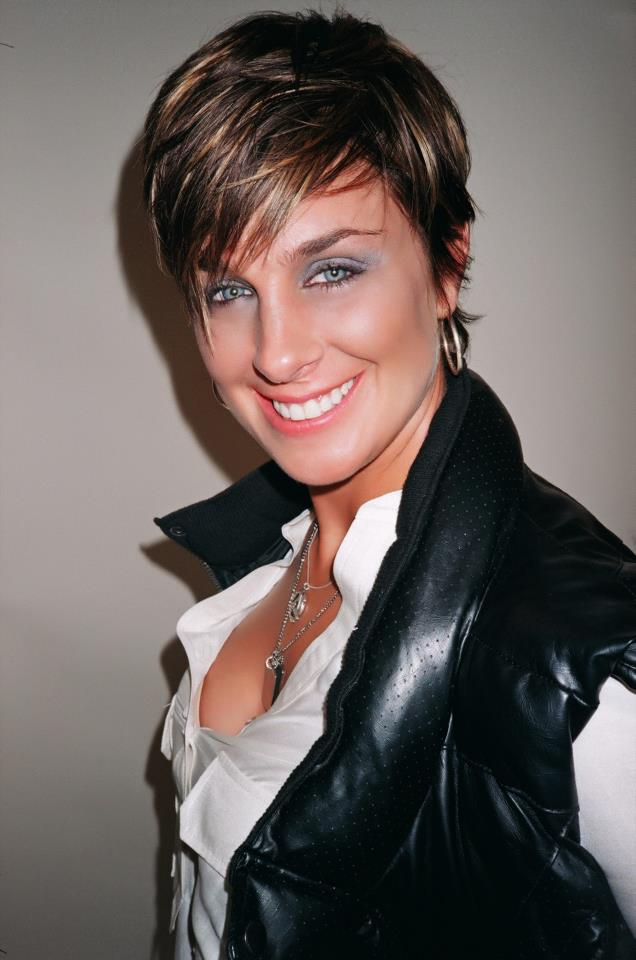
- Tracy Young 2012

Background information
- Born: Theresa Young
- Origin: Washington, DC
- Genre: House
- Occupations: DJ, producer, remixer, songwriter, record label owner
- Years active: 1991–present
- Labels: Ferosh Records, F-Region Productions
- Website: tracyyoung.com

Theresa "Tracy" Young is an American electronic dance music DJ, producer, remixer, and owner of Ferosh Records. Young has been credited in over 60 No. 1 Billboard Dance hits, and has collaborated on remixes with over 100 artists, including 14 for Madonna. Her "I Rise" (Tracy Young Pride Intro Radio Remix) for Madonna received a nomination at the 62nd Annual Grammy Awards, in the Best Remixed Recording category, and won. This marked the first time a female producer had been nominated and won in this category.

== Biography ==
In 1989, at 19, Young DJed at frat parties at University of Maryland and later was the resident DJ at the Hill Haven Nightclub in Washington, D.C. Young graduated from the University of Maryland with a Bachelor's degree in Speech Communication.

== Career ==
Young began her professional radio career as an intern at the urban-leaning rhythmic-formatted radio station WPGC 95.5FM in Washington D.C. while she was still attending the University of Maryland. She became an on-air mix show deejay for several of the station's highly rated shows. She was soon promoted to Assistant Music Director and then became the stations Music Director where she remained for a year and a half before accepting a new position at Interscope Records. The new position resulted in her relocating to Miami, a city with a thriving club music scene. Shortly after her move, Young met club impresario Ingrid Casares who along with Chris Paciello opened Liquid nightclub in South Beach. Young landed the permanent deejay residency position at Liquid and during her residency she served as the deejay for many events hosted by celebrities including Sean Puffy Combs, Russell Simmons, Cher, Ricky Martin and many others. It was during her time at Liquid, where Young first met Madonna. She was able to land a prominent gig to deejay a party celebrating the launch of Madonna's film The Next Best Thing. Their friendship and professional relationship blossomed and Young was asked to deejay Madonna's and Guy Ritchie's wedding in Scotland.

Throughout her career as a professional DJ, Young has served as a deejay for many events including The Emmy Awards, the Sundance Film Festival, Kylie Minogue's 2011 Aphrodite: Les Folies North American tour, and Britney Spears' 21st birthday. In 2003, Young launched her own record label, Ferosh Records and she also began serving as executive producer of the annual New Year's Day party called Genesis. She actively supports philanthropic causes and has held fundraising campaigns for various LGBT charities such as GLAAD, GMHC, Elton John AIDS Foundation and The National Gay and Lesbian Task Force. In addition, Young has been a featured talent for Pride Festivals all around the world since 1990.

Young has appeared in numerous television programs such as MTV's House of Style, BET's Rap City, E!'s Kourtney & Khloe Take Miami, Bravo's The Real Housewives of Atlanta and The Real Housewives of Miami and LOGO reality-television series, The A-List: New York.

In 2017, Young was tapped to remix the campaign song for Hillary Clinton's run for the Presidency of the United States Of America. The song titled "Stronger Together" features recording artist Jessica Sanchez.

Young's career in the music industry and her Billboard Dance Club Songs chart history has been featured in the following press: DJ Times, The Advocate, Billboard Magazine, LOGO, and HuffPost.

== Discography ==
=== Albums ===
Year	Album	Artist(s)	Label
2003	Tracy Young Remixes Living Theater	Various	Kunduru Music
2016	Living Cinema	Tracy Young, NonChalant	Ferosh Records

=== EPs ===
List of EPs featuring Tracy Young, showing artist(s), label, and year released
Year	Album	Artist(s)	Label
2004	Unreleased Vol. 1	Various Artists	Ferosh Records
2013	Roulette: Summer Edition	Blue featuring Tracy Young	Page One Artists GmbH, 25 Media Berlin
2018	Believe in We (Reimagined)	Various Artists	Ferosh Records
2021	TomorrowNow	Nic Kat, TomorrowNow, Lucca, Daniel Metrey, Karina Iglesias	Ferosh Records
2021	Shining Bright	Tracy Young, Ceevox, Deep Influence, Jose 'Spinnin' Cortes	Ferosh Records

=== Original Singles ===
List of Tracy Young originals, showing artist(s), label, and year released
Year	Song	Artist(s)	Label
2003	"Believe in We"	Tracy Young featuring Ceevox	Ferosh Records
2003	"Ferosh"	Alan T and Tracy Young	Ferosh Records
2006	"What's Done Is Done"	Tracy Young featuring Ceevox	Ferosh Records
2013	"Awww Shit"	Tracy Young	Ferosh Records
2013	"Color of Your Eyes"	Tracy Young and Astrid Suryanto	Ferosh Records
2013	"Giddy Up"	Tracy Young	Ferosh Records
2015	"Free Your Mind"	Tracy Young	Ferosh Records
2015	"Give It Up"	Tracy Young and Astrid Suryanto	Ferosh Records
2016	"I Can Forgive"	Tracy Young, Maya Simantov	Ferosh Records
2016	"Roshá"	Alan T	Ferosh Records
2016	"Same Love"	Tracy Young, Karina Iglesias, TomorrowNow	Ferosh Records
2016	"We Can Do Better"	Tracy Young	Ferosh Records
2017	"Peace, Love & Music"	Tracy Young and Ceevox	Ferosh Records
2018	"SCOPA"	Tracy Young	Ferosh Records
2018	"Let It Go"	Suzanne Palmer	Ferosh Records
2018	"Get 'Cha There"	Suzanne Palmer	Ferosh Records
2019	"On and On"	Tracy Young featuring Ceevox	Ferosh Records
2019	"Frqncy"	Tracy Young and Jose 'Spinnin' Cortes	Ferosh Records
2019	"Girls Night Out"	Debbie Gibson and Tracy Young	Stargirl Records
2021	"Ochun"	The Young Collective featuring Jei	Ferosh Records
2021	"Shining Bright"	Tracy Young featuring Ceevox	Ferosh Records
2021	"Doin' Enough"	Tracy Young and Duncan James	Ferosh Records
2021	"Distraction"	Tracy Young and NonChalant	Ferosh Records
2021	"One Step Closer"	Debbie Gibson and Tracy Young	Stargirl Records
2022	"Feel The Beat"	The Young Collective featuring Jei	Ferosh Records
2022	"Survivor"	Ultra Naté and Tracy Young	BluFire / Peace Bisquit
2023	"Love Don't Care"	Debbie Gibson and Tracy Young	Stargirl Records

=== Compilation Appearances ===
List of compilation albums featuring remixes by Tracy Young, showing year released and label
Year	Album	Label
2001	Inside My Head	SFP Records
2002	The Circuit Party Volume 7	SPG Music
2003	White Party 2003: Flash Back - Fast Forward	Ferosh Records
2004	BMG Dance Compilation #140	BMG Music
2005	Winter Party Volume 4	borderline Music
2005	Danceculture	Ferosh Records
2006	Danceculture 2	Ferosh Records
2007	The Event (Limited Edition) - Tony Moran	Moran Music
2009	Genesis Part 1	Ferosh Records

=== Remixes ===
List of singles with Tracy Young credited as remixer, showing year released, artist(s), song title and remix credit
Year	Artist(s)	Song	Remix credit
1999	Enrique Iglesias	"Bailamos"	
1999	Enrique Iglesias	"Rhythm Divine"	(Tracy Young Remix)
1999	Simply Red	"Ain't That a Lot of Love"	
1999	Pet Shop Boys	"I Don't Know What You Want but I Can't Give It Any More"	(The Young Collective Remix)
2000	Madonna	"Music"	(The Young Collective Club Mix)
2000	Madonna	"Don't Tell Me"	(Tracy Young Remix)
2000	P!nk	"Don't Let Me Get Me"	(Tracy Young Club Mix)
2001	Madonna	"GHV2 Megamix"	(Tracy Young's Shake & Stir Club Mix), (Tracy Young Megamix)
2001	Madonna	"What It Feels Like for a Girl"	(Tracy Young Club Mix), (Tracy Young Cool Out Radio Mix)
2001	Shakira	"Whenever, Wherever"	(Tracy Young Tribal Mix), (Tracy Young's Spin Cycle Mix)
2001	Stevie Nicks	"Planets of the Universe"	(Tracy Young Club Mix)
2002	Christina Aguilera featuring Redman	"Dirrty"	(DJ Tracy Young Remix), (DJ Tracy Young Radio Mix)
2002	Cyndi Lauper	"Shine"	(Tracy Young Remix), (Tracy Young Radio Edit)
2003	Gloria Estefan	"Wrapped"	(Tracy Young Remix)
2003	Madonna	"Easy Ride"	(Unreleased)
2003	Madonna	"Nothing Fails"	(Tracy Young's Underground Mix)
2004	Gloria Estefan	"Hoy"	(Tracy Young Club Version)
2005	Amerie	"Take Control"	(Tracy's Taking Control Mix - Radio Edit)
2005	Ari Gold	"Wave of You"	
2005	Chaka Khan	"I Believe"	
2005	Madonna	"Hung Up"	(Tracy Young's Get Up & Dance Groove)
2005	Shakira featuring Alejandro Sanz	"La Tortura"	
2006	10 Monkeys featuring Abigail	"Lay Down"	(Tracy Young's Anthem Mix)
2006	Amber	"Melt with the Sun"	(Tracy Young's Anthem Mix)
2006	Amuka	"Craving"	
2006	Hedda Layne	"Feel the Love"	(Tracy Young Dub Mix)
2006	Janice Grace	"Geisha Girl"	(Tracy Young Miami Remix)
2006	Jason and deMarco	"Trying to Get to You"	(Tracy Young Club Vocal)
2006	Jason Walker	"No More"	(Tracy Young's Club Mix)
2006	Mariah Carey	"Fly Like a Bird"	
2006	Paris Hilton	"Stars Are Blind"	(Tracy Does Paris Club Mix), (Tracy Does Paris Mixshow Edit)
2006	Idina Menzel & Tracie Thoms	"Take Me or Leave Me"	(Tracy Young Remix)
2006	Superchumbo	"U Know I Love It"	
2007	Mary J. Blige	"Just Fine"	
2007	Nemesis	"Number One in Heaven"	(Tracy Young Extended Club Mix)
2008	Alan T	Ferosh	
2008	Britney Spears	"Break the Ice"	(Tracy Young Mix)
2008	Celeda	"Amazing"	(Tracy Young Remix)
2008	Celeda	"Good Time"	(Tracy Young Has a Good Time Mix)
2008	Celine Dion	"All by Myself"	
2008	Chris Brown	"With You"	(Tracy Young Remix)
2008	Debbie Holiday	"Joyful Sound"	
2008	Idina Menzel	"Defying Gravity"	(Tracy Young's Flying Monkey Club Mix)
2008	Idina Menzel	"Gorgeous"	(Tracy Young Remix)
2008	Jimmy D. Robinson	A Tiny Shoe	(Tracy Young Club Mix)
2008	Kat Danson	"Sugarfree"	(The Tracy Young Remixes)
2008	Kristine W	"The Boss"	(Tracy Young Radio Edit)
2008	Madonna featuring Justin Timberlake & Timbaland	"4 Minutes"	(Tracy Young House Mix), (Tracy Young Mixshow)
2008	Oryon	"Bounce"	(Tracy Young Radio Remix)
2008	Rihanna	"Don't Stop the Music"	
2008	Stevie Nicks	"Stand Back"	(Tracy Takes You Home Mix)
2009	Akon featuring Colby O'Donis & Kardinal Offishall	"Beautiful"	(Tracy Young Monster Club Mix)
2009	Erika Jayne	"Pretty Mess"	(Tracy Young Club)
2009	Kim Zolciak	"Tardy for the Party"	(Tracy Young's Don't Be Tardy Radio Mix)
2009	Lionel Richie	"I Call It Love"	(Tracy Young's Lovin It Remix)
2009	Madonna featuring Lil Wayne	"Revolver"	(Tracy Young's Shoot To Kill Remix)
2009	V Factory	"Love Struck"	
2010	Amy Weber	"Something Kinda Ooh!"	(Tracy Young Dub Mix)
2010	Audio Playground	"Shadows"	
2010	Ceevox	"What's Done is Done"	
2010	Dangerous Muse	"I Want It All"	(Tracy Young Dub Mix)
2010	Kaylah Marin	"On The Floor (Oh Baby Please)"	(Tracy Young Club)
2011	Britney Spears	"Hold It Against Me"	(Tracy Young Ferosh Anthem Mix), (Tracy Young Ferosh Radio Remix)
2011	Deborah Cox	"If It Wasn't for Love"	(Young Collective Main Mixshow)
2011	Kelly Clarkson	"Stronger (What Doesn't Kill You)"	
2011	L2	Boys or Girls	
2011	Olivia Newton-John	"Magic"	
2011	Olivia Newton-John	"Physical"	
2011	Laura LaRue & Lee Dagger	"Capture Your Love"	(Tracy Young Remix)
2011	Stevie Jewel	"One Last Kiss"	(Tracy Young Big Room Vocal Club)
2012	C-Rod featuring Jason Walker	"Raise Your Hands"	(Young Collective Remix)
2012	Madonna	"Gang Bang"	(Tracy Young Private Mix) (Unreleased)
2012	Margo Rey	"Habit"	(Tracy Young Radio)
2012	Movida	"Do You Feel Me"	(Tracy Young Remix)
2012	Nikki Williams	"Glowing"	
2013	Astrid Suryanto	"Home"	
2013	Astrid Suryanto	"To Find You"	
2013	Astrid Suryanto	"Color of Your Eyes"	
2013	Audio Playground	"Put Your Hands Up"	
2013	Blue	"Ayo"	(Tracy Young Radio Mix)
2013	Blue	"Break My Heart"	
2013	Blue	"Paradise"	(Tracy Young Radio Mix)
2013	Blue	"Sing for Me"	(Tracy Young Mix)
2013	Cher	"Woman's World"	(Tracy Young's Ferosh Club Mix)
2013	Christina Perri	"Human"	
2013	Demi Lovato	"Neon Lights"	(Tracy Young Remix)
2013	Felix da Housecat	"I Just Want To Be a Lesbian"	
2013	Ginny Blackmore	"Bones"	
2013	Katy Perry	"Unconditionally"	(Tracy Young Club Mix)
2013	NJ Taylor	"I Don't Care"	
2013	Rana Raines	"Leap of Faith"	
2013	Vensun	"Love is Love"	
2013	ZZ Ward	"Last Love Song"	(Tracy Young Ferosh Remix)
2014	Alina Artts	"High Enough"	(Tracy Young Dub)
2014	Beyoncé	"Pretty Hurts"	(Tracy Young Dub)
2014	Cher	"Walk Alone"	(Tracy Young Ferosh Reconstruction)
2014	Five Knives	"Sugar"	
2014	Kylie Minogue	"Into the Blue"	(Tracy Young Ferosh Reconstruction Club)
2014	Noelia	"Mind Blown"	
2014	Sir Ivan featuring Taylor Dayne	"Kiss All the Bullies Goodbye"	(Tracy Young Radio Mix)
2015	Bea Miller	"Young Blood"	(Tracy Young Ferosh Reconstructed Remix)
2015	Beyoncé	"7/11"	(Tracy Young's Smack It in the Air Dub)
2015	Paris Hilton featuring Birdman	"High Off My Love"	(Tracy Young Extended Remix)
2015	Lady Gaga	"Til It Happens to You"	(Tracy Young's Ferosh Reconstruction Mixshow)
2016	Bielfield	"Kings & Queens"	(Tracy Young Ferosh Reconstruction Radio)
2016	Chaos featuring CeCe Peniston	"Believe"	(Tracy Young Ferosh Vocal Mix)
2016	Dave Audé & Karine Hannah	"I'm Burning Up"	(Tracy Young Remix)
2016	Michelle Obama & Various Artists	"This is for My Girls"	(Tracy Young First Lady Remix)
2016	Enrique Iglesias featuring Wisin	"Duele el Corazón"	(Tracy Young Remix)
2016	Jessica Sanchez	"Stronger Together"	(Tracy Young Hillary's Making History Full Vocal Remix), (Tracy Young Remix)
2016	Offer Nissim featuring Dana International	"We Can Make It"	(Tracy Young's Mixed With Love Extended Remix)
2017	Bright Light Bright Light featuring Elton John	"All in the Name"	(Tracy Young Remix)
2017	Katy Perry featuring Skip Marley	"Chained to the Rhythm"	(Ferosh Reconstruction Radio Edit), (Ferosh Reconstruction Mix)
2017	Enrique Iglesias featuring Descemer Bueno & Zion & Lennox	"Súbeme la Radio"	
2019	Hilary Roberts	"Back to Life"	(Tracy Young Club Remix), (Tracy Young Extended Remix)
2019	Dionne Warwick	"You Really Started Something"	(Tracy Young Extended Remix)
2019	Celeda	Vibe’N	
2019	Madonna	"I Rise"	(Tracy Young's Pride Intro Radio Remix),(Tracy Young's Pride Extended Remix); Winner: Best Remixed Recording, Non-Classical – 62nd Grammy Awards
2019	Madonna & Swae Lee	"Crave"	(Tracy Young Dangerous Remix), (Tracy Young Dangerous Dub)
2020	Debbie Gibson	"Girls Night Out"	(Tracy Young #VegasVibe Remix),(Dub, Radio, Extended, Alt Remixes)
2020	Alex Newell	"Boy, You Can Keep It"	(Tracy Young Remix), (Tracy Young Extended Mix)
2020	Aloe Blacc	"I Do"	(Tracy Young Dance Mix)
2020	Anabel Englund	"See The Sky"	(Tracy Young Remix)
2020	Tegan and Sara	"I'll Be Back Someday"	(Tracy Young Extended Remix), (Tracy Young Remix)
2020	DVRKO	"Death March"	(Tracy Young Remix)
2020	Billy Porter	"For What It's Worth"	(Tracy Young Groove For Good Mix)
2020	Cyndi Lauper	"Hope"	(Tracy Young Hopeful Remix)
2020	Bright Light Bright Light featuring Andy Bell	"Good at Goodbyes"	(Tracy Young Remix)
2020	Sofia Carson	"Guess I'm a Liar"	(Tracy Young Remix)
2021	MFSB featuring The Three Degrees	"TSOP (The Sound of Philadelphia)"	(Tracy Young Remix), (Tracy Young Dub Mix), (Tracy Young Instrumental)
2021	Debbie Gibson	"One Step Closer"	
2021	k.d lang	"Constant Craving"	(Fashionably Late Remix); Nominee: Best Remixed Recording, Non-Classical – 64th Annual Grammy Awards
2021	Reba McEntire	"Turn On the Radio"	(Tracy Young Remix)
2021	Macy Gray & The California Jet Club	"The Disco Song"	(Tracy Young's Bump & Grind Radio Remix), (Tracy Young's Bump & Grind Remix)
2022	Madonna	"Nothing Fails"	(Tracy Young's Underground Radio Edit)
2022	Jennifer Lopez & Maluma	"Marry Me"	(Tracy Young Vocal, Dub and Radio Edits)
2022	Ultra Naté	"Survivor"	(Tracy Young Extended Remix)
