= Naked (Amber album) =

Studio album by Amber
- Released: August 20, 2002
- Genre: Pop; Dance
- Length: 58:06
- Label: Tommy Boy Records

Amber chronology
Remixed (2001)	Naked (2002)	My Kind of World (2004)

Professional ratings
Review scores
Source	Rating
Allmusic	4/5 stars
Slant	3.5/5 stars
The Village Voice	(choice cut)

Naked is Amber's third studio album released in 2002 on Tommy Boy Records. It features mostly pop songs and very few dance songs, unlike her previous albums. The singles include "Yes!", "The Need to Be Naked" and "Anyway (Men Are from Mars)". The album also includes a "The Need to Be Naked" remix by Thunderpuss, but this remix was not available on all copies. The lyrics to the first song "Yes!" are based on Molly Bloom's soliloquy in James Joyce's novel Ulysses.

== Track listing ==
All tracks are written by Marie-Claire Cremers and Wolfram Dettki, unless otherwise noted.

No.	Title	Writer(s)	Length
1.	"Yes!"	Marie-Claire D'Ubaldo; Rick Nowels; Billy Steinberg	3:51
2.	"The Need to Be Naked"	Marie-Claire Cremers; Jimmy Harry; Billy Steinberg	3:56
3.	"Anyway (Men Are from Mars)"		4:03
4.	"You're Sent From Heaven"		4:14
5.	"Dirty Thoughts"	Marie-Claire Cremers; Arnie Roman; Russ DeSalvo	4:08
6.	"He"		4:15
7.	"Sex Without Sex"	Marie-Claire Cremers; Joacim Persson; Pelle Ankarberg; Niclas Molinder	3:46
8.	"Love on You"		3:42
9.	"If There Would Be No Tomorrow"		3:26
10.	"Heavenly Proximity"	Anne-Mieke De Vroomen	4:00
11.	"Sex and The City"		3:48
12.	"Don't Say Goodbye"		3:17
13.	"Sexual (Li Da Di) (Afterlife Chillout Remix)"	Marie-Claire Cremers; Rick Nowels; Billy Steinberg	6:00
14.	"The Smile of My Child"	Marie-Claire Cremers; Anne-Mieke de Vroomen	5:40
Total length:			58:06

Bonus track
No.	Title	Writer(s)	Length
15.	"The Need to Be Naked (Thunderpuss Remix)"	Marie-Claire Cremers; Jimmy Harry; Billy Steinberg	3:55
Total length:			62:01
