= Girls Night Out (Debbie Gibson song) =

Pop music single by Debbie Gibson

Single by Debbie Gibson

from the album The Body Remembers
- Released: June 7, 2019
- Length: 3:33
- Label: Stargirl Records
- Songwriter: Debbie Gibson
- Producer: Sean Thomas

Debbie Gibson singles chronology
"80s Baby" (2018)	"Girls Night Out" (2019)	"Lost in Your Eyes, the Duet" (2021)

"Girls Night Out" is a 2020 song by American singer-songwriter Debbie Gibson originally released on June 7, 2019 as the first single from her tenth studio album, The Body Remembers which came out on August 20, 2021. It was her 41st single overall.

== Chart performance ==
It was first digitally released to American radio stations in 2019 through her label, Stargirl Records, but did not immediately chart. However, on January 10, 2020, the "Girls Night Out" (Tracy Young Remixes) were digitally released to music venues, and the song entered the Billboard Dance Club Songs Chart at No. 44. The "Girls Night Out" (VegasVibe Remix) soon went from No. 15 to No. 8 on Dance Club Songs survey dated March 7, 2020, becoming Gibson's first entry to the top ten of a Billboard chart since Electric Youth in 1989. On March 10, 2020, the song peaked at No. 4.

== Music video ==
The music video for "Girls Night Out" was shot in Las Vegas, Nevada, featuring showroom dancers and casinos.

== Weekly charts ==
Chart (2020)	Peak position
US Dance Club Songs (Billboard)	4
