= Jane Castro =

American singer

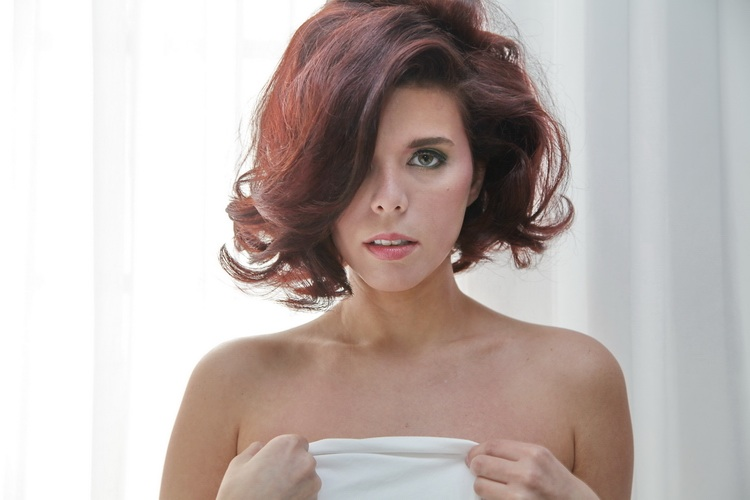

Background information
- Born: Jane Castro; April 30, 1982 (age 44); Miami, Florida
- Origin: Miami
- Genres: Pop, House Music - Latin American
- Occupations: Singer, Reality TV star
- Years active: 1997–present
- Label: Defected Records Murk (band) Nervous Records Ministry of Sound Tracy Young
- Website: www.missjei.com

Jane Castro (born April 30, 1982) is an American musician, recording artist and TV personality who is active in the American and Latin markets. Born in Miami, Florida, on April 30, 1982, to Cuban immigrants, she is professionally known as Jei and Jane Castro.

== Early career ==
Jane Castro first began performing in high school as a part of the school chorus and drama club. On her 15th birthday she released her first demo with two songs related to the celebrated Spanish tradition of Quinceañera or ‘Sweet Fifteen’. Following this Jei was featured in an article in The Miami Herald about local musical talent and was also interviewed by several other local magazines.

Coverage in these publications opened several opportunities for the performer. The National Foundation for the Advancement of the Arts (NFAA) invited her to participate in their Alumni Award, an annual national singing contest. The YoungArts programme was established in 1981 to encourage young talent. Castro also performed on MTV's Spring Break and American Idol 2003. Following this Jei was invited to appear at several other MTV venues.

As Castro's profile was growing she began to get more involved in the underground house music scene that was thriving in Miami. In clubs such as Space she met established music professionals like Edgar V., Oscar Gaetan of Murk Productions, Ralph Falcón, Charlie Solana and Sammy O. Jei began to develop her own style by performing in some of the leading clubs through Hot Jam Entertainment.

== Recordings ==
In May 2011 Jei recorded ‘Amame’, which was produced by Ralph Falcón on Nervous Records. According to the Miami New Times, Falcón and Oscar Gaetan “defined [the 90s] worldwide house sound” achieving seven consecutive number one singles on Billboard’sHot Dance Music/Club Play chart. It was released as a single for a year exclusively on vinyl to commemorate the 20-year anniversary of Murk Records and described as “homegrown Latin-flavored Miami house at its best”.

‘Amame’ has been remixed by numerous artists including Claude Monnet, Dyed Soundorom Downtown, Radio Slave, Noir and René Kristensen. It has also featured on numerous house and club albums and was used during the 2012 Miss World competition.

Jei released ‘Enlevez-Moi’ with DJ Christian Falero on Sydney Blu's label, Blu Music in 2011. A remix of ‘Enlevez-Moi’ by Paul Thomas was featured on Sirius Radio and the UK's BBC Radio 1 and subsequently featured by Sydney Blu on Nervous Records.

Jei released the solo single ‘Show Me The Money’ and produced by Giuseppe D. of Spy Music Group. The track was released on iTunes to coincide with her debut on U.S. reality TV show ‘Tough Love’. In 2013 the artist released the "Brave Myself" EP via O - Beat Entertainment.

Jei performed at the renowned 2013 International Dance Music Awards (IDMA) where ‘Amame’ (featuring Jei) was nominated for Best House/Garage/Deep House Track.

In 2014, Jei has released her first album Entitled - JEI. Produced by Oba Frank Lords with Songs Written by: Michael M, Jei, and Oba Frank Lords.

In 2021 - Jei has released with Grammy Award Winner Tracy Young The Young Collective feat. Jei "Ochun"

In 2024 - Defected Records re-released Amame with Fleur Shore and Dunmore Brothers remixes of Intruder feat. Jei "Amame"

== Name That Tune 2026 ==
Jane Castro appears as the season finale on "Name That Tune" on FOX Season 5 Episode 14 “Fiery Fun & Frolics" “I have been told that I’m an encyclopedia of music. I know music. I can, like, I’ll listen to something, and I’ll be, like, right away I’ll be like, ‘I know that name, I know that singer. I know everything,’ so I was ready for this show, I was ready! I’m on the finale tonight, and it’s so exciting and so great, like, this is a great start for 2026.”

== Tough love ==
Jane Castro joined the cast of reality show, ‘Tough Love’ in the third season of the Vh-1 show. The series debuted to over 1 million viewers and is based on the concept of a dating ‘boot camp’ in which several women compete in dating challenges designed to makeover their love lives.

Speaking about the advice received on the programme, Castro said that every woman “should know to not move too fast. Be sure to slow down and relax. Let it happen and enjoy the moment. Don’t worry about, will he call me? Will he text me? You are ruining it for yourself.”

Her persona on the show was described as ‘Miss Bossy’. Responding in an interview with NBC Miami to criticism of her character on the show, Jei said: “When I read the blogs, even if they are mean, I love it. It makes the show even more entertaining. They can talk as much trash as they want because if someone is reading [the blogs] [and] hasn’t seen the show before, they might think, ‘Wow, I need to tune in.’”

== DUI ==
On August 4, 2010, Castro was arrested for Driving under the influence (DUI). The incident was subsequently broadcast on the second episode of Tough Love. She described the event as a landmark moment in her life: “...Seeing my mug shot was a bigger wake up call... I hope people learn from my experience.”

== Gay Ally ==
Jei performed at Bear Nation Gay Pride 2012 at Chalk Miami Beach and is due to both perform at the 2013 Miami Gay Pride Parade, joining Michael M. on a float organised by Pepe Billete, a Miami New Times columnist and radio/TV personality.

In 2013 Jei was part of Orgullo Gay Pride which is a non - profit organization for the LGBT Hispanic/Latino Community that was taken part in Miami Beach, Fl. Jei will part of Orgullo Gay Pride in 2014.

Jei was nominated for the 2014 and 2015 Pink Flamingo Awards for Favorite Singer/Band, held in Miami Beach, Florida. The awards honor people, places and organizations that have demonstrated a level of excellence in the LGBT community throughout the year. Jei is also a member of Unity Coalition; the first and only organization for the South Florida Latino|Hispanic|LGBT Community (lesbian, gay, bisexual, transgender, questioning) that advances equality and fairness since 2002.

In 2019, Jei participated in the Pride Fort Lauderdale celebration, appearing in a runway fashion show at the Hard Rock Event Center at the Seminole Hard Rock Hotel & Casino in Hollywood, Florida. The event was hosted by RuPaul’s Drag Race alum Naomi Smalls and television personality Carson Kressley, and featured designs by former Project Runway participants. The show included models of different gender identities and drag performers presenting avant-garde garments.

Jane Castro/Jei received the 2020 reader's choice Southfloridagaynews.com website Best of Miami Artist/Musician award

In 2021 Jane Castro/Jei would participate with Tracy Young at the Chicago Pride In The Park on June 26 and 27. It was one of the first festivals safely staged in Chicago since the pandemic started. Performances were also by Chaka Khan and Tiesto.

== Select discography ==
=== Singles ===
2026

- Torre & Lords Feat. JEI - S.E.X.O"

ALABAO MUSIC

- Jei - "Abundance"

BOPMESH MUSIC

2025

- Superman! Feat. Jei

Joey Se & Lazaro Leon Almighty1music

2024

- Amame feat. Jei - Fleur Shore Remix Defected Records
- Amame feat. Jei - Dunmore Brothers Remix Defected Records

2023

- Can2 feat. JEI "It's The Music"

2022

- Isaac Escalante and Jesus Montañez feat. JEI "Dance" - Queen House Music
- The Young Collective feat. JEI "Feel It" - Ferosh Recordings Tracy Young

2021

- The Young Collective feat. JEI "Ochun" - Ferosh Recordings Tracy Young
- CAN2 Presents JEI "Detox Your Love" - CAN2 Music and Media

2020

- Sara Simms feat. JEI - "Finally" - Sara Simms production
- Leyva feat. JEI - "Set Me Free" - Exit 32 Recordings

2018

- JEI - "Your Woman" - Gonna Be Records
- JEI - "Blue Skies" - Big Mouth Music

2016

- Ralph Falcon Feat. JEI - "Be Together" - MURK Records

2015

- JEI - "Stay Strong/Survive" - Gonna Be Records

2013

- JEI *Brave Myself - O - Beat Entertainment
- JEI "I'm Ready - O - Beat Entertainment

2012

- Amame - Intruder feat. Jei - Defected/Nervous Records

‘”2011”’

- ”Enlevez-Moi” with DJ Christian Falero - Blu Music
- ”Show Me The Money” - Spy Music Group

=== Albums ===
'"2014"'

- "JEI" - O - Beat Entertainment

'"2013"'

- "Brave Myself" - O - Beat Entertainment

=== Compilation albums ===
Jei has been featured in the following compilation albums:

‘”2023”’

- ”Defected Presents House Masters Luke Solomon" Amame Feat. Jei - Luke Solomon Remix - Defected Records

”2016”’

- ”Marcos Carnaval - Samba", Marcos Caranaval - Touch Away feat. Jei (various artists) - Tommy Boy Records

‘”2014”’

- ”Oscar G - Beat Volume 2 ”, Oscar G. Feat. Jei - Can't Fuck With You (various artists) – Nervous Records

‘”2013”’

- ”Greetings From Miami 2013 Sampler”, (various artists) – 4Tune Entertainment,
- ”Deep Down & Defected Volume 2”, (various artists) – ITH
- ”Brave Myself”, (various artists) – 4 Tune Entertainment
- ”Defected Presents Noir in the House”, (various) – Defected

‘”2012”’

- ”Noir in the House Remix Sampler”, (various artists) – Defected
- ”Deep Down & Defected”, (various) – ITH
- ”Deep House – Ministry of Sound”, (various artists) – Ministry of Sound
- ”Defected Presents The Opening Party Ibiza 2012”, (various) – ITH
- ”Defected Accapellas Deluxe Volume 10”, (various artists) – Defected
- ”Defected Presents Beach Clubbing Ibiza”, (various artists) – ITH
- ”Defected Present House Masters”, DJ Chus (various artists) – ITH
- ”Bargrooves Deeper 2.0”, Bargrooves
- ”Amame (The Lost Dubs)” – Defected
- ”Most Rated 2012” (various) – ITH
