= My Kind of World =

Studio album by Amber
- Released: 5 October 2004
- Recorded: 2003–2004
- Genres: Pop, rock, alternative dance
- Length: 50:02
- Label: JMC
- Producers: Wolfram Dettki, Amber

Amber chronology
Naked (2002)	My Kind of World (2004)	Undanced II (2007)

Amber's fourth album is titled My Kind of World. Amber co-wrote 10 of the 12 songs on the album. The album features three singles: "You Move Me", "Voodoo" and "Just Like That."

== Track listing ==
1. "Crucified Solitude"
2. "You Move Me"
3. "Voodoo"
4. "Same Old Paradise"
5. "Sacrificial Lamb"
6. "Private War"
7. "When a Love Grows Cold
8. "Just Like That (Romeo and Juliet)"
9. "City of Pain"
10. "Your Kind of World"
11. "More Time for a Child"
12. "Don't Follow Me Home"

== Singles ==
=== You Move Me ===
Released in 2004, it swiftly climbed the dance and club charts following its release, though it has received no mainstream radio support. "You Move Me" achieved a #4 peak on the Billboard Hot Dance Music/Club Play chart in October.

=== Voodoo ===
The Maxi Single "Voodoo" was released in June 2005. It peaked at #13 on the Hot Dance Music/Club Play chart.

=== Just Like That ===
The third and final single lifted from "My Kind of World", "Just Like That", released in 2005, is as of February 2006 a Top Ten Dance Format Radio hit in America. "Just Like That" peaked at #6 on the Hot Dance Music/Club Play chart.
