= Studio Rio =

Studio Rio Presents: The Brazil Connection
- Studio Rio Presents: The Brazil Connection album cover

Studio album by Studio Rio
- Released: June 2014
- Recorded: 2014
- Genres: Samba, Bossa Nova
- Length: 36:58
- Label: Legacy Recordings
- Producer: Berman Brothers

Studio Rio Presents: The Brazil Connection is an album of well-known songs arranged for samba and bossa nova. The recording was published in digital formats, on vinyl record, and as a compact disc in 2014 by Legacy Recordings. Song versions were arranged and performed by Studio Rio, a band of Brazilian musicians specializing in the bossa nova and samba genres. Notable members include Roberto Menescal and Marcos Valle.

The album's release was timed to coincide with the FIFA World Cup Brazil in June 2014, and the collection was included in ESPN's coverage of the 2014 world cup. "Studio Rio Presents: The Brazil Connection" was also published as part of the 2014 official FIFA album titled "One Love, One Rhythm." The album's twelve tracks include the vocals of Bill Withers, Aretha Franklin, Marvin Gaye, Billie Holiday, Sly & The Family Stone, The Isley Brothers, Mel Torme, Nina Simone, Johnny Nash, Dave Brubeck with Carmen McRae, Andy Williams and Sarah Vaughan. The album was produced by Frank and Christian Berman who used separation technology to isolate the vocals from master recordings. They then blended the vocals with new instrumentation.

== Development and Composition ==
In an interview with the Huffington Post, the Bermans said that, prior to developing "The Brazil Connection," they had been attending raves in London where they heard expert Brazilian music. At the same time, they greatly admired the jazz standards of the 1960s and 70s as sung by Billie Holiday, Aretha Franklin, and Sly and the Family Stone. One day they heard a Billie Holiday recording from a distance. All they could hear was the voice, and they got the idea from that to combine jazz standard vocals with new arrangements and instrumentation. Their aim was to blend "the beauty of the classic American vocal performances of Billie Holiday or Aretha Franklin or Sly Stone with that sultry, really fantastic intelligent Brazilian backbone." The compilation uses twenty musicians and four composers. The Bermans selected the songs that would work in new Brazilian arrangements from their "office," a coffee shop one block away from the beach in Rio de Janeiro. In composing the album, the Bermans used technology to isolate the vocals from original tracks, then they assembled the musicians of Studio Rio and recorded them playing along to the recorded voice, using a click track to establish the rhythm. The album uses few overdubs. In explaining the division of labor, Frank Berman said that he is the one who talks to the record companies and locates studios for the musicians while Christian prefers to work directly with musicians in the studio.

The Bermans expressed an intention to take the album on a tour, with stops to include London, New York, Amsterdam, and Berlin. The tour will feature the live performances of the instrumentalists while using recordings of the original vocal artists.

And they had the production assistance in Brazil of producer Ronaldo Mendonça.

== Reception ==
"Studio Rio: The Brazil Connection" ranked seventh on KCRW's list of 25 top-played albums. The compilation was well received by the music critics. The Scottish Express noted that the tracks featuring Bill Withers' "Lovely Day," Andy Williams' "Music To Watch Girls By," and Nina Simone's "I Wish I Knew What It Means To Be Free" elicit a "summery feel." Huffington Post music writer, Mike Ragogna wrote that the album's version of Marvin Gaye's "Sexual Healing" was now his favorite because the new version replaced the "dated electronics" giving the song a "new sensuous world." The Wall Street Journal describes the album's new sound as "sultry."

In his blog, music reviewer Marc Myers said that, when the compilation first came to his attention, he was afraid that it would be as lifeless as the Verve recordings of the jazz standards. So he was surprised to find that the new album is lively and original while also being respectful to the original artists. "The vocals were left unmarred while the original drum box and wah-wah instrumental was replaced by a spirited bossa nova," he wrote. The Sun Herald praised the "newly minted versions" of Holliday's "You've Changed," Isley Brothers "It's Your Thing," and Mel Torme's "I've Got You Under My Skin."

== Track listings ==
1. Bill Withers with Studio Rio - Lovely Day
2. Aretha Franklin with Studio Rio - Walk On By
3. Marvin Gaye with Studio Rio - Sexual Healing
4. Billie Holiday with Studio Rio - You've Changed
5. Sly & The Family Stone with Studio Rio - Family Affair
6. The Isley Brothers with Studio Rio - It's Your Thing
7. Mel Torme with Studio Rio - I've Got You Under My Skin
8. Nina Simone with Studio Rio – I Wish I Knew What It Means To Be Free
9. Johnny Nash with Studio Rio - I Can See Clearly Now
10. Dave Brubeck with Carmen McRae with Studio Rio - Take 5
11. Andy Williams with Studio Rio - Music To Watch Girls By
12. Sarah Vaughan with Studio Rio – Summertime
