= Amber (Amber album) =

Studio album by Amber
- Released: 21 September 1999
- Genre: Pop, Dance
- Label: Tommy Boy

Amber chronology
'This Is Your Night' (1996)	Amber (1999)	'Remixed' (2000)

Singles from Amber
- 1. "Sexual (Li Da Di)" Released: 8 June 1999; 2. "Above the Clouds" Released: 2000; 3. "Love One Another" Released: 2000

Professional ratings
Review scores
Source	Rating
AllMusic	4/5 stars

Amber is the second studio album by Dutch singer Amber. It was released in 1999 on Tommy Boy Records, and features dance-pop, Hi-NRG, house, and Urban contemporary songs. It is her most well-received album by the American pop mainstream, to date. She co-wrote three songs with songwriters/producers Rick Nowels and Billy Steinberg: "Sexual (Li Da Di)," "Above the Clouds," and "Love One Another." The song "Above the Clouds" was featured in the season 3 finale of the television series Sex and the City.

After the digital release of The Hits Remixed - Extended in June 2022, which contained full length remixes of Amber's hit singles and sparked a renewed interest in her music, Amber entered the Amazon Digital Dance/Pop Albums chart and peaked at number 3.

== Track listings ==
1. "Above the Clouds", Marie-Claire D'Ubaldo / Rick Nowels / Billy Steinberg, (4:10)
2. "Love One Another", Amber MC Cremers / Rick Nowels / Billy Steinberg, (3:30)
3. "Spiritual Virginity", Amber MC Cremers & Wolfram Dettki, (3:58)
4. "Object Of Your Desire", Amber MC Cremers & Wolfram Dettki, (3:40)
5. "Sexual (Li Da Di)", Amber MC Cremers / Rick Nowels / Billy Steinberg, (4:37)
6. "Without You", Amber MC Cremers / Benny Cosgrove / Kevin Clark, (3:18)
7. "I Found Myself In You", Pam Sheine / Kyle Nevan / Lex Wilson, (4:41)
8. "If I'm Not the One", Amber MC Cremers & Wolfram Dettki, (4:08)
9. "Let's Do It for Love", Denise Rich / Deborah Cooper / F. Berman / C. Berman, (3:38)
10. "Don't Wanna Stop", Amber MC Cremers / F. Berman / C. Berman / J. Coplan, (3:46)
11. "If You Could Read My Mind", G. Lightfoot, (3:25)
12. "How Can I Tell You", Amber MC Cremers & Wolfram Dettki, (3:59)
13. "I'm Free", Anne-Mieken de Vroomen & Amber MC Cremers, (2:25)
14. "Sexual (Li Da Di)", (Thunderpuss Remix: Barry Harris & Chris Cox), (3:47)

== Singles ==
- "Sexual (Li Da Di)", released on 8 June 1999 in the United States and on 12 June 2000 in the United Kingdom, became a pop hit, peaking at No. 42 on the US Billboard Hot 100, No. 55 in Australia, No. 24 in New Zealand, and No. 34 in the UK.
- "Above the Clouds"
- "Love One Another"
