= Amber (Dutch singer) =

Dutch singer, songwriter, label owner (born September 17 , 1969)

- Born: Marie-Claire Cremers; 17 September 1969 (age 57); Ubbergen, Netherlands
- Origin: Netherlands
- Genres: Eurodance, house, R&B, pop rock
- Occupations: Singer-songwriter, record producer
- Years active: 1990–present
- Labels: Tommy Boy Records (1996–2003), Rhino, Ada, JMCA Enterprises (2003–present)
- Website: facebook.com/AmberSings

Marie-Claire Cremers (born 17 September 1969), known professionally as Amber, is a Dutch-born singer-songwriter, record label owner and producer. She is perhaps best-known for her 1990s dance-pop singles, "This Is Your Night" (1996), "If You Could Read My Mind", and "Sexual (Li Da Di)" (1999). In December 2016, Billboard ranked her as the 34th most successful dance artist of all time; the magazine later ranked her at No. 7 on the list of most successful artists on the Dance Singles Sales chart during the 2000s.

In the 2020s Amber's career experienced a resurgence, as Tommy Boy Records–the label she was originally signed to (owned by Reservoir Media)–began releasing previously vaulted remixes of her songs to digital platforms worldwide. Beginning in 2022, six of nine re-releases have been Top 3 hits on the iTunes US Dance Chart, with four being chart-toppers: "Above the Clouds" (remix), "Love One Another" (Remix), "Colour of Love" (Remix) and "If You Could Read My Mind" (25th Anniversary Edition). The success of these releases, roughly thirty years since her career began, sparked a renewed interest in Amber's catalog amongst listeners; her albums This is Your Night (1996), Amber (1999) and Naked (2002) received a boost, and also charted on the Amazon Euro Pop and Dance Pop Bestsellers charts in 2023.

== Career ==
=== 1996–1997: This is Your Night ===
Amber's music career took off when one of her demos, "This Is Your Night", was released by Tommy Boy Records. The single was on the US Billboard Hot 100 chart for an entire year, from 1996 to 1997. The song was also used in the film A Night at the Roxbury (1998) and has since appeared on many dance compilation records and in numerous films.

A full-length album of the same name soon followed, which spawned two additional hit singles, "Colour of Love" and the Hani remix of "One More Night".

=== 1998–1999: Amber ===
In 1999, Amber released her self-titled second album, which garnered the most mainstream attention thus far. The album was preceded in 1998 by the single "If You Could Read My Mind", both a cover version of the 1970 song of the same name by Canadian singer-songwriter Gordon Lightfoot and a collaboration with Ultra Naté and Jocelyn Enriquez; the trio recorded and performed the track under the name Stars on 54 for the closing scene and end credits of the Miramax film 54.

The first official single from Amber was "Sexual (Li Da Di)", which charted on the Billboard Hot 100 and spent 17 weeks at No. 1 on the Singles Sales Chart. The album also included the No. 1 dance hits "Above the Clouds" and "Love One Another". The former song, as well as the album cut "Object of Your Desire", later gained exposure when licensed for the television series Sex and the City (1998–2004).

In addition to four American singles, German label ZYX also released "Do That To Me One More Time" and "I Found Myself in You". The former single was recorded exclusively for the European market and issued with an accompanying video, shot in Manhattan.

=== 2000: The Hits Remixed ===
Amber's next album, The Hits Remixed, was released in 2000. The album included remixes of all of her singles to that time, including "If You Could Read My Mind", as well as the non-album track "Taste the Tears", which she recorded for the Sex and the City soundtrack. "Taste the Tears" was written by Diane Warren and produced by Thunderpuss.

Remixes of "Love One Another" and "Taste the Tears" were commissioned to promote the album. "Love One Another", which peaked at No. 1 on the Billboard Dance Club Play Chart, thus became the fourth overall single from Amber and the first from The Hits Remixed.

In addition to her own recordings, Amber co-wrote "Bless You Child", which Bette Midler sang and recorded on her 2000 album Bette, along with Billy Steinberg and Rick Nowels. She also sang on Nile Rodgers' charity single "We Are Family"; Amber can be seen sharing the microphone with Dionne Warwick in the music video, directed by Spike Lee.

Another milestone was achieved in 2001, when Cher covered "Love One Another" for her album Living Proof (2001). In 2003, the song returned to No. 1 through Cher's release as a double A-side with "When the Money's Gone"), and was nominated for a Grammy Award for Best Dance Recording, an accolade that Amber shared as co-songwriter.

=== 2001–2003: Naked and departure From Tommy Boy ===
Amber's third album, Naked, was released in early 2002. Musically, Amber continued the path she had started with: she continued to co-write her own songs and lyrics and attempted even more of a departure from her original Eurodance sound. Three singles were culled from the album.

The lead single "Yes" was written by Steinberg, Nowels, and Marie-Claire D'Ubaldo, who had previously penned Amber's "Above the Clouds" as well as Celine Dion's "Falling Into You". The track used lyrics from James Joyce's novel Ulysses, which were licensed from Joyce's estate; Joyce was credited as co-songwriter. Mainstream radio's reaction to "Yes" was reminiscent of the attitude towards "Sexual (Li Da Di)" two years earlier. Programmers expressed concern about the perceived sexual subtext of the track and the use of the word "breast". It was suggested that Amber change the lyric from "breast" to "breath", which she refused to do.

Two further singles were released from the album: "The Need to Be Naked" and "Anyway (Men Are From Mars)". The latter was Amber's first single written entirely on her own.

Amber bought out her contract with Tommy Boy Records after the promotional cycle for Naked, citing creative differences. According to Amber, she was unhappy with the direction of her career as well as how the label had handled the marketing of Naked.

=== 2004–2005: My Kind of World ===
Following her departure from Tommy Boy, Amber created her own label, JMCA Enterprises, through which she issued her fourth album, My Kind of World, in 2004. The album's moodier tone and more intimate songs were a departure from her previous uptempo dance music. Amber nevertheless released remixes for three singles: "You Move Me", "Voodoo", and "Just Like That". The album featured guitarist Hendrik Helmer, who contributed to several tracks on the release.

The same year, she released Undanced, a collection of previously unreleased remixes.

=== 2006–2011: Re-recordings and non-album singles ===
After promotion for My Kind of World had run its course, Amber collaborated with Sweet Rains on the stand-alone single "Melt with the Sun". The single was released on 12 December 2006, and was remixed by Tracy Young, Hex Hector, and Lance Jordan among others.

In 2007, Amber re-recorded many of the tracks from her second and third albums for digital release, as well as Undanced II, which included entirely unreleased songs as well as demos and remixes. The following year, she re-released her debut single "This Is Your Night" with new remixes. She followed up by collaborating with Zelma Davis of C+C Music Factory fame on a cover of "No More Tears (Enough Is Enough)". Both songs were accompanied by new music videos.

In 2009, she released "I Don't Believe in Hate (Drip Drop)" after discovering the track on the MySpace page of singer-songwriter Kelly Mueller. In 2011, she issued her final new recording to date, a remake of "One More Night".

=== 2022–present: Further reissues ===
In 2022, Tommy Boy Records, now under new ownership, began reissuing Amber's hit singles with previously unreleased remixes, including:

- "Sexual (Li Da Di)" (Plasma Trance Remix – Extended) (May 2022)
- The Hits Remixed – Extended (June 2022)
- "Above the Clouds" (July 2022)
- "Love One Another" (August 2022)
- "Colour of Love" (September 2022)
- "This Is Your Night" (Special Edition) (June 2023)
- "If You Could Read My Mind" (25th Anniversary Edition) (July 2023)
- "Being with You" (August 2023)
- "Colour of Love", Part II (September 2023)
- "One More Night" (October 2023)
- "Sexual (Li Da Di)" (February 2024)

On 31 May 2024, a 25th anniversary edition of Amber was released on CD and vinyl. The set includes the original album as well as remixes.

== Discography ==
=== Albums ===
==== Studio albums ====
| Year | Album details | Peak chart positions | | | |
| Year | Album details | NZ | US Electr | US Indie | US Heat |
|---|---|---|---|---|---|
| 1996 | This Is Your Night: Released: 25 November 1996; Label: Tommy Boy Records; Formats: CD | 44 | — | — | 49 |
| 1999 | Amber: Released: 21 September 1999; Label: Tommy Boy Records; Formats: CD | — | — | 10 | 10 |
| 2002 | Naked: Released: 20 August 2002; Label: Tommy Boy Records; Formats: CD | — | 7 | 20 | 20 |
| 2004 | My Kind of World: Released: 5 October 2004; Label: JMC Enterprises; Formats: CD | — | — | — | — |

==== Compilation albums ====
- Remixed (2000)
- Undanced (2004)
- Undanced II (2007)

=== Singles ===
| Year | Title | Peak chart positions | | | | | | | | | Certifications | Album |
| Year | Title | GER | AUS | FRA | NED | NZ | SPA | UK | US | US Dance | Certifications | Album |
|---|---|---|---|---|---|---|---|---|---|---|---|---|
| 1996 | "This Is Your Night" | — | 11 | — | 14 | 40 | — | 143 | 24 | 10 | AUS: Gold | This Is Your Night |
| 1996 | "Colour of Love" | — | 66 | — | — | 31 | — | — | 74 | 5 | | This Is Your Night |
| 1997 | "One More Night" | — | — | — | — | — | — | — | 58 | 9 | | This Is Your Night |
| 1998 | "If You Could Read My Mind" (Stars on 54: Ultra Naté, Amber, Jocelyn Enriquez) | — | 3 | 82 | — | 6 | 10 | 23 | 52 | 3 | AUS: Gold | Amber |
| 1999 | "Sexual (Li Da Di)" | 87 | 55 | 40 | 94 | 24 | — | 34 | 42 | 1 | US: Gold | Amber |
| 2000 | "Above the Clouds" | — | — | — | — | — | — | — | — | 1 | | Amber |
| 2000 | "Love One Another" | — | — | — | — | — | — | — | — | 1 | | Amber |
| 2001 | "Yes!" | — | — | — | — | — | — | — | — | 1 | | Naked |
| 2002 | "The Need to Be Naked" | — | — | — | — | — | — | — | — | 1 | | Naked |
| 2002 | "Anyway (Men Are from Mars)" | — | — | — | — | — | — | 116 | — | 12 | | Naked |
| 2004 | "You Move Me" | — | — | — | — | — | — | — | — | 4 | | My Kind of World |
| 2005 | "Voodoo" | — | — | — | — | — | — | — | — | 13 | | My Kind of World |
| 2006 | "Just Like That" | — | — | — | — | — | — | — | — | 9 | | My Kind of World |
| 2006 | "Melt with the Sun" | — | — | — | — | — | — | — | — | 5 | | Non-album single |
| 2008 | "No More Tears (Enough Is Enough)" (Amber and Zelma Davis) | — | — | — | — | — | — | — | — | — | | Non-album single |
| 2009 | "I Don't Believe in Hate (Drip Drop)" | — | — | — | — | — | — | — | — | — | | Non-album single |
"—" denotes releases that did not chart

== See also ==
- List of Billboard number-one dance club songs
- List of artists who reached number one on the U.S. Dance Club Songs chart
- Mononymous person
