= It's Our Thing =

Studio album by the Isley Brothers
- Released: April 1969
- Studio: A&R (New York City)
- Genre: Funk; soul; funk rock; psychedelic soul
- Length: 26:37
- Label: T-Neck, Buddah
- Producer: The Isley Brothers

The Isley Brothers chronology
Doin' Their Thing: Best of the Isley Brothers (1969)	It's Our Thing (1969)	The Brothers: Isley (1969)

Singles from It's Our Thing
- 1. "It's Your Thing" Released: February 1969

Professional ratings
Review scores
Source	Rating
AllMusic	4.5/5 stars
Pitchfork	7.7/10

It's Our Thing is the sixth album released by the Isley Brothers on their own T-Neck Records imprint in April 1969. Fully emancipated from three and a half years in Motown Records and encouraged by their international success in the United Kingdom, the Isleys composed this album in the style of Sly & the Family Stone/James Brown funk that was dominating the music industry at the time but with their own flair as explained in their smash "It's Your Thing". Other hits off the album though it did not chart included "I Know Who You Been Socking It To" and "Give the Women What They Want". This album was also the Isleys' first Top 40 record reaching #22 on the pop albums chart.

Despite its importance in the career of the seminal group, this album was not released in CD format until 2008. The album was remastered and expanded for inclusion in the 2015 released CD box set "The RCA Victor & T-Neck Album Masters, 1959-1983". Although not featured on the album's cover, It's Our Thing marks the first Isley Brothers album to feature Ernie Isley on bass guitar.

== Track listing ==
All tracks are written by Rudolph Isley, O'Kelly Isley and Ronald Isley.

Side One
No.	Title	Length
1.	"I Know Who You Been Socking It To"	2:42
2.	"Somebody Been Messin'"	2:36
3.	"Save Me"	3:30
4.	"I Must Be Losing My Touch"	2:00
5.	"Feels Like the World"	3:25

Side Two
No.	Title	Length
6.	"It's Your Thing"	2:47
7.	"Give the Women What They Want"	2:17
8.	"Love Is What You Make It"	2:37
9.	"Don't Give It Away"	2:43
10.	"He's Got Your Love"	2:00

== Personnel ==
The Isley Brothers

- Ronald Isley – lead vocals
- O'Kelly Isley, Jr. and Rudolph Isley – background vocals
- Everett Collins – drums, percussion
- Ernie Isley – bass, guitar

with

- Instrumentation by assorted New York City musicians

Technical

- Tony May – recording and mix engineer
- Acy R. Lehman – art direction
- James Kriegsmann Jr. – cover photography
