= Sock It to Me Baby/It's Your Thing =

- 7" Vinyl Single Cover

Single by Lotti Golden
- A-side: "Sock It to Me Baby/It's Your Thing"
- B-side: "Annabelle With Bells (Homemade Girl)
- Released: 1969
- Recorded: 1969
- Genre: Rock, Soul, Funk, Pop
- Length: A-Side 3:27, B-Side 4:10
- Label: Atlantic Records
- Songwriters: Crewe/Brown (A-side), O. Isley*, R. Isley*, R. Isley*(A-side), Lotti Golden,(B-side)
- Producer: Bob Crewe

For Record Store Day, April 16, 2016, the 7" single that followed Golden's 1969 (Atlantic Records) debut, Motor-Cycle was reissued on High Moon Records with the participation of Warner Bros. Records and Rhino Records. The reissue, like the 1969 version, is a mash-up- funk cover of The Isley Brothers', It's Your Thing and "Sock it To Me Baby" written by the album's producer Bob Crewe. "Annabelle With Bells (Home Made Girl)," on the B-side, is a soulful, girl-group inspired song written by Golden. The reissue contains a picture sleeve with new cover art, a previously unreleased photo of Golden, and remastered audio. "Annabelle With Bells (Home Made Girl)," did not appear on the 1969 LP due to time constraints in a pre-digital world, and is exclusively available on the single.

Motor-Cycle is a fusion of urban street poetry, girl group moxie, and teen angst informed by Golden's immersion in the late Sixties counterculture in New York City's East Village and the Lower East Side.

Golden was part of a new wave of female singers who began to shake up the status quo in the late Sixties. Breaking from the confines of pop they defined themselves by their confessional lyrics, taking on new controversial subject matter. In July, 1969, Newsweek ran a feature story, describing this new school of talented female troubadours, who both sing and write, including Joni Mitchell, Laura Nyro, Melanie, Golden and to Elyse Weinberg, heralding the era of the female singer-songwriter.

== Formats and track listings ==
- Sock It To Me Baby/It's Your Thing / Annabelle With Bells (Home Made Girl) (7", Single) Atlantic 45-2687 US 1969
- Sock It To Me Baby/It's Your Thing / Annabelle With Bells (Home Made Girl) (7", Single) Atlantic Atlantic ATL NP 03149, ATL-NP 03149 Italy 1970

A.1 Sock It To Me Baby: Writer: Bob Crewe, L. Russell Brown A.2 "It's Your Thing": Writer: Ronald Isley, O'Kelly Isley, Jr., Rudolph Isley B. Annabelle With Bells (Home Made Girl): Writer: Lotti Golden

Reissue

- A. 1) Sock It To Me Baby, 2) It's Your Thing
- B. 1) Annabelle With Bells (Home Made Girl)
