= Melt with the Sun =

"Melt With the Sun" is a dance music song written by Amber (aka Marie-Claire Cremers) and Sweet Rains, performed by Amber and produced by Sweet Rains and released on November 14, 2006. The dance music remixes EP has 10 tracks including remixes by Grammy Winner Hex Hector, Tracy Young, Al B Rich, AM Corona, Sweet Rains, Pathos V2, and Lance Jordan.

The song had its genesis in 2005 when dance music producer and remixer Sweet Rains asked Amber for her feedback on a song that he was working on. Amber provided her input to Sweet Rains, changing some melody lines and rewriting the lyrics.

The more that she worked on the song, the more she felt it would make a perfect dance music single to follow up her U.S. Top Ten Dance Music Radio hit "Just Like That". She pitched the idea to Sweet Rains and he quickly agreed.

"Melt With the Sun" is officially credited to Amber featuring Sweet Rains and has been released by JMCA.

== Track listing ==
1. Sweet Rains Original Mix – 6:54
2. Tracy Young's Anthem Mix – 9:47
3. Hex Hector Club Mix – 9:16
4. Pathos V2 Club Mix – 7:16
5. Al B Rich Club Mix – 7:34
6. AM Corona Club Mix – 7:47
7. Lance Jordan Dub Mix – 8:23

== Charts ==
- In its first week of release to the dance music Djs, Melt With the Sun is the #1 Breakout on the Billboard Club Dance Music chart (for November 11, 2006).
