= This Is Your Night (album) =

1996 album by Amber

Studio album by Amber
- Released: November 25, 1996
- Recorded: 1996
- Studio: Shark Media Studios (Hamburg, Germany); Playa (Barcelona, Spain); Soundworks (New York)
- Genre: Eurodance
- Length: 53:25
- Label: Tommy Boy Records
- Producer: Berman Brothers

Amber chronology
This Is Your Night (1996)	Amber (1999)

Singles from This Is Your Night
- 1. "This Is Your Night" Released: May 21, 1996; 2. "Colour of Love" Released: January 28, 1997; 3. "One More Night (Hani Remix)" Released: September 1997

Professional ratings
Review scores
Source	Rating
AllMusic	4.5/5 stars
The Encyclopedia of Popular Music	3/5 stars
Pittsburgh Post-Gazette	2/4 stars

This Is Your Night is the first album by the Dutch dance-pop singer Amber. It was released on Tommy Boy Records in 1996. It was released as Colour of Love in the United Kingdom.

All three singles released off the album charted on the US Billboard Hot 100 including the title track, "This Is Your Night", which peaked at #24 on the US Billboard Hot 100 and at #44 in New Zealand.

== Critical reception ==
Billboard called the album "Euro-NRG of the highest and most festive quality."

== Track listing ==
1. "This Is Your Night"
2. "Move Your Body"
3. "Colour of Love"
4. "You Are the One"
5. "One More Night"
6. "Push It to the Limit"
7. "Being With You"
8. "Hold My Body Tight"
9. "Can You Feel the Love"
10. "Losing Myself in Your Love"
11. "Let It Rain"
12. "This Is the Right Time"
13. "This Is Your Night (House Mix)"
14. "Colour of Love (House Mix)"

== Singles ==
The album's first single, "This Is Your Night", was released in 1996 before the release of the album. It was a hit in several countries, crossing over from the rhythmic and club charts to the US Billboard Hot 100, peaking at #24 and receiving a Gold certification from the RIAA in the United States. It also peaked at #40 in the Adult Top 40 radio. In Australia, it peaked at #11 on the ARIA Charts, #40 in New Zealand, and at #3 in Japan. The song appeared in the film A Night at the Roxbury, as well as on the film's soundtrack.

The album's second single, "Colour of Love", was released in 1996, and peaked at #74 on the US Billboard Hot 100, and at #58 on the Australian ARIA Charts and #31 in New Zealand.

A remix of the song "One More Night" by the dance producer Hani was released as the third single. It peaked at #58 on the US Billboard Hot 100.
