= I Turned You On =

Single by The Isley Brothers

from the album The Brothers: Isley
- A-side: "I Know Who You Been Socking It To"
- Released: May 21, 1969
- Recorded: A&R Studios, New York City; 1969
- Genre: Funk/soul
- Length: 2:40
- Label: T-Neck; 902
- Songwriters: Ronald Isley; O'Kelly Isley, Jr. Rudolph Isley
- Producer: The Isley Brothers

The Isley Brothers singles chronology
"It's Your Thing" (1969)	"I Turned You On" (1969)	"Black Berries (Part 1)" (1969)

"I Turned You On" is a 1969 funk song by The Isley Brothers, released on their T-Neck imprint. The single was almost as big a hit as their predecessor, "It's Your Thing", reaching number six on the R&B chart and number twenty-three on the pop chart.

== Background ==
The song's then-controversial usage of the popular sock it to me catchphrase (the song depicting sex) helped its popularity among fans.

== Personnel ==
- Ronald Isley: lead vocals
- O'Kelly Isley, Jr. and Rudolph Isley: background vocals

== Chart performance ==
Chart (1969)	Peak position
US Billboard Hot 100	23
US Best Selling Rhythm & Blues Singles (Billboard)	6
