= This Is Your Night (Amber song) =

1996 single by Amber

Single by Amber

from the album This Is Your Night
- Released: 1996
- Genre: Eurodance; house; hi-NRG; dance-pop
- Length: 3:58
- Label: Tommy Boy
- Songwriters: Marie-Claire Cremers (Amber); Christian Berman; Gilbert Montagné
- Producer: Berman Brothers

Amber singles chronology
"This Is Your Night" (1996)	"Colour of Love" (1996)

Music video
- "This Is Your Night" on YouTube

"This Is Your Night" is a song by Dutch singer-songwriter Amber, released in 1996 by Tommy Boy Records as the lead single from her debut album, This Is Your Night (1996). It is written by Amber, and produced by German producers Berman Brothers and other programmers. In January 1996, a promotional version of this song was released to select Rhythmic Top 40/dance radio stations in Chicago and New York. This version was replaced with the "Original Edit" and was never released on any album or single. The accompanying music video was directed by Jeff Kennedy and filmed in New York City.

"This Is Your Night" reached number one in Israel, and had great success in many countries, particularly in Australia, Belgium, Japan, Lebanon, the Netherlands, New Zealand and Spain. It charted in the top 40 in the United States and gained further prominence after appearing in the 1998 American comedy film, A Night at the Roxbury. On the US Billboard Hot 100, "This Is Your Night" peaked at number 24 in 1997.

== Critical reception ==
Barry Walters for The Advocate complimented the song as a "sugarcoated treat". Alex Henderson from AllMusic described it as "catchy". Larry Flick from Billboard magazine praised the song, naming it "Euro-NRG of the highest and most festive quality". He added that "she oozes with endearing girlish charm and a squeaky-cute voice", noting the "immediately infectious chorus". On the single review, Flick remarked that the normally hip-hop-rooted Tommy Boy "dives head-first into the ongoing Euro-NRG craze with a bouncy anthem that will have folks who never get enough of La Bouche-styled rhythm twirling with ear-to-ear grins." He concluded, "Amber has enough charisma to push this single over the top." Chuck Campbell from Knoxville News Sentinel felt that "positive energy radiates" from the song. L.A. Times named it a "classic house groove", stating that "Amber works the beats like a pro, turning each phrase into a perfect fusion of rhythm and melody." They continued, "In fact, there's something downright addictive about the dabba-dabba-dop, dip-dop-n-day phrase she sprinkles" through the song. A reviewer from Sun-Sentinel described it as "a chirpy, made-for-the-turntables pop number."

== Chart performance ==
"This Is Your Night" peaked at number 14 in the Netherlands and number 33 in Iceland. In Spain, it peaked at number three on AFYVE's maxi-singles chart. Outside Europe, the single reached number one in Israel, number 10 on the Canadian RPM Dance chart, and numbers 11 and 40 in Australia and New Zealand, respectively. In the US, it peaked at number 24 on the Billboard Hot 100, number 10 on the Billboard Dance Club Play chart and number seven on the Billboard Top 40/Mainstream chart. The song finished 1996 at number 82 on the Billboard Hot 100 year-end chart. "This Is Your Night" was awarded with a gold record in Australia, with a sale of 35,000 singles.

== Music video ==
The music video for "This Is Your Night" was filmed in New York City, directed by Jeff Kennedy, and produced by Nicola Doring. It premiered in October 1996. It features Amber singing in a pool wearing a glittery jewelled headpiece and surrounded by flowers floating on the water posing with "prayer hands". Other scenes features the singer performing on a bed or in front of a small mirror in a jewel box. She is also seen dancing with other dancers. In between male dancers are dancing in showering water. In the video words like 'free', 'forever', 'true', 'yeah', 'girl', 'night', 'love' and 'heart' are projected with light on the dancers. The video ends with Amber asleep in her bed.

== Impact and legacy ==
In 2013, American magazine Vibe ranked "This is Your Night" number 13 in their list of "Before EDM: 30 Dance Tracks from the '90s That Changed the Game" in 2013. In 2017, Billboard ranked it number 39 in their list of "The 100 Greatest Pop Songs of 1997". Billboard editor Andrew Unterberger wrote, "A dance-floor clarion call from its opening seconds, "This Is Your Night" was as undeniable as hi-NRG dance-pop got in '97, seemingly one long continuous chorus serving as a baton relay between mega-hooks." Same year, BuzzFeed ranked the song number seven in their list of "The 101 Greatest Dance Songs of the '90s".

== Remixes ==
On June 17, 2022, the Junior Vasquez Sunday Night Bump Extended Remix, which was never previously issued commercially, was released to all digital platforms internationally as part of the Amber Remixed - Extended Versions long form compilation of club remixes.

As of 2022, the following versions of "This Is Your Night" are available for download:

1. The original album version (1996)
2. The US 6-track CD maxi single (1996)
3. The worldwide 11 track digital special edition single
4. Two remixes on "The Hits Remixed" (2000): the Mousse T. remix (track 7) and the Junior Vasquez Sunday Night Bump extended mix (track 10)
5. The 3-track re-recorded single (JMCA, 2008) and two club mixes on "The Hits Remixed - Extended" (2022 digital release): the Junior Vasquez Sunday Night Bump extended mix (track 5) and the Mousse T. remix - extended (track 6)

== Dispute ==
There has been an ongoing dispute between Amber and the Berman Brothers regarding the publishing shares of the song. Amber wrote a majority of the lyrics to the song. In 1997, Amber's share was reduced to 6.6%, as the Berman Brothers added the song to their publishing company Shark Media.

== Track listings ==
UK CD single (1996)
No.	Title	Length
1.	"This Is Your Night" (radio mix)	3:40
2.	"This Is Your Night" (Berman House mix)	5:49

UK maxi CD (1996)
No.	Title	Length
1.	"This Is Your Night" (radio mix)	3:40
2.	"This Is Your Night" (original 12" mix)	5:40
3.	"This Is Your Night" (Sunday Night mix)	8:44
4.	"This Is Your Night" (Mousse T mix)	6:34
5.	"This Is Your Night" (1018 dub)	7:51
6.	"This Is Your Night" (DJ Enrie dub)	5:07

UK maxi CD (Helicopter remix) (1996)
No.	Title	Length
1.	"This Is Your Night" (Helicopter remix)	6:05
2.	"This Is Your Night" (1018 mix)	8:27
3.	"This Is Your Night" (Berman House mix)	5:49
4.	"This Is Your Night" (DJ Enrie Workout mix)	9:47
5.	"This Is Your Night" (Sunday Night Bump dub)	6:00

US CD SlidePak (1996)
No.	Title	Length
1.	"This Is Your Night" (main mix)	3:58
2.	"This Is Your Night" (DJ Enrie radio mix)	3:48

US maxi CD (1996) / digital maxi (2017)
No.	Title	Length
1.	"This Is Your Night" (Junior's Sunday Night Bump mix)	8:45
2.	"This Is Your Night" (Bermans House mix)	5:49
3.	"This Is Your Night" (DJ Enrie Workout mix)	9:43
4.	"This Is Your Night" (1018 mix)	8:27
5.	"This Is Your Night" (original edit)	3:58
6.	"This Is Your Night" (Junior's Sunday Night Bump dub)	6:00

Digital maxi (Remixes) - worldwide (2023)
No.	Title	Length
1.	"This Is Your Night" (original edit / version)	3:58
2.	"This Is Your Night" (original 12" mix)	5:40
3.	"This Is Your Night" (radio mix)	3:40
4.	"This Is Your Night" (DJ Enrie radio mix)	3:47
5.	"This Is Your Night" (DJ Enrie dub)	5:07
6.	"This Is Your Night" (Helicopter remix)	6:05
7.	"This Is Your Night" (Helicopter dub)	5:45
8.	"This Is Your Night" (1018 dub)	7:52
9.	"This Is Your Night" (Mousse T extended instrumental)	6:36
10.	"This Is Your Night" (Mousse T Dangerous dub)	6:42
11.	"This Is Your Night" (Mousse T radio instrumental)	4:33

== Charts ==
=== Weekly charts ===
Chart (1996–1997)	Peak position
Australia (ARIA)	11
Belgium (Ultratip Bubbling Under Flanders)	14
Canada (Nielsen SoundScan)	13
Canada Dance/Urban (RPM)	10
France Airplay (SNEP)	53
Iceland (Íslenski Listinn Topp 40)	33
Israel (Israeli Singles Chart)	1
Netherlands (Dutch Top 40)	16
Netherlands (Single Top 100)	14
New Zealand (Recorded Music NZ)	40
Spain Maxi-Singles (AFYVE)	3
UK Pop Tip Club Chart (Music Week)	12
US Billboard Hot 100	24
US Adult Pop Airplay (Billboard)	40
US Dance Club Songs (Billboard)	10
US Dance Singles Sales (Billboard)	15
US Pop Airplay (Billboard)	7
US Rhythmic Airplay (Billboard)	14
US Cash Box Top 100	18

=== Year-end charts ===
Chart (1996)	Position
US Billboard Hot 100	82
US Maxi-Singles Sales (Billboard)	45
US Top 40/Mainstream (Billboard)	72
US Top 40/Rhythm-Crossover (Billboard)	45

Chart (1997)	Position
US Rhythmic Top 40 (Billboard)	96
US Top 40/Mainstream (Billboard)	50

== Certifications ==
Region	Certification	Certified units/sales
Australia (ARIA)	Gold	35,000^{^}
^{^} Shipments figures based on certification alone.

== Re-recorded version (2008) ==
"This Is Your Night (re-recorded)"

Single by Amber
- Released: 2008
- Label: JMCA

Amber singles chronology
"No More Tears (Enough is Enough)" (2008)	"This Is Your Night (re-recorded)" (2008)	"I Don't Believe in Hate (Drip Drop)" (2009)

In 2008, Amber re-recorded "This Is Your Night", utilising modern production techniques and adding some new elements. This version is routinely ranked among the most popular in her catalogue on digital streaming and download platforms.

Amber released the newly recorded single via her own label JMCA. The release included three versions: a radio edit, an extended mix, and a show mix.

=== Track listing ===
Digital single - JMCA (2008)
No.	Title	Length
1.	"This Is Your Night" (radio edit)	3:53
2.	"This Is Your Night" (extended mix)	7:32
3.	"This Is Your Night" (show mix)	3:48

== "This Is Your Night (Special Edition)" (2023) ==
"This Is Your Night (Special Edition)"

Single by Amber
- Released: 2023
- Label: Tommy Boy Records (Reservoir Media)

Amber singles chronology
"Colour of Love (Remixes)" (September, 2022)	"This Is Your Night (Special Edition)" (2023)	"If You Could Read My Mind (25th Anniversary Edition)" (July, 2023)

On June 14, 2023, Tommy Boy Records (Reservoir Media) released 11 vault remixes of "This Is Your Night". With this release, many of the tracks became available on digital streaming and download platforms for the very first time.

This maxi single was the sixth in an ongoing series of planned reissues of Amber catalog remixes that have been vaulted for decades. "This Is Your Night (Special Edition)" was preceded by "Sexual (Li Da Di) (Plasma Trance Remix - Extended)" (May 2022), "The Hits Remixed - Extended" (June 2022), "Above the Clouds (Remixes)" (July 2022), "Love One Another (Remixes)" (August 2022) and "Colour of Love (Remixes)" (September 2022).

=== Track listing ===
This Is Your Night (Special Edition) (2023)
No.	Title	Length
1.	"This Is Your Night"	3:58
2.	"This Is Your Night" (original 12" mix)	5:35
3.	"This Is Your Night" (radio mix)	3:42
4.	"This Is Your Night" (DJ Enrie radio mix)	3:47
5.	"This Is Your Night" (DJ Enrie dub)	5:08
6.	"This Is Your Night" (Helicopter remix)	6:06
7.	"This Is Your Night" (Helicopter dub)	5:45
8.	"This Is Your Night" (1018 dub)	7:52
9.	"This Is Your Night" (Mousse T. extended instrumental)	6:37
10.	"This Is Your Night" (Mousse T Dangerous dub)	6:43
11.	"This Is Your Night" (Mousse T. radio instrumental)	4:34
