= It's Your Thing =

Single by The Isley Brothers

from the album It's Our Thing
- B-side: "Don't Give It Away"
- Released: 1969
- Recorded: January 1969
- Studio: A&R Studios, New York City
- Genre: Psychedelic funk; R&B
- Length: 2:47
- Label: T-Neck: TN 901
- Songwriters: Ronald Isley; O'Kelly Isley, Jr.; Rudolph Isley
- Producer: The Isley Brothers

The Isley Brothers singles chronology
"Put Yourself in My Place" (1969)	"It's Your Thing" (1969)	"I Turned You On" (1969)

Official Audio
- "It's Your Thing" on YouTube

"It's Your Thing" is a funk single by The Isley Brothers. Released in 1969, the anthem was an artistic response to Motown chief Berry Gordy's demanding hold on his artists after the Isleys left the label in late 1968.

The lyrics of the chorus, which also serve as first verse, run: "It's your thing/ Do what you wanna do/ I can't tell you/ Who to sock it to". The song is ranked No. 420 on the Rolling Stone magazine's list of The 500 Greatest Songs of All Time.

== History ==
=== Overview ===
After scoring one popular hit with the label, with the song "This Old Heart of Mine (Is Weak for You)", the Isleys felt typecast in the role as a second-tier act while well-established Detroit acts like The Temptations, The Miracles, and the Four Tops got more promotion from the label Motown.

The brothers' decision to leave Motown came after their successful tour of the UK, where they had a bigger fan base than in the United States. A re-release of "This Old Heart" had reached number three on the UK Singles Chart. Similar success came with two more singles from their Motown catalog that were hits well after their Motown departure.

Berry Gordy allowed the brothers to leave the label, and the Isleys reactivated their own label, T-Neck Records, which they had originally started a few years prior to their Motown signing. For Buddah Records, the Isleys recorded "It's Your Thing", which Ronald wrote upon arriving home after taking his daughter Tawana to school. The lead singer said that he conceived the melody and some of the lyrics in his head. His older brothers O'Kelly and Rudolph helped compose additional lyrics.

=== Release and reaction ===
Recorded in two takes and featuring the first appearance of 16-year-old Ernie on bass and Skip Pitts on guitar. The song was released as a single on February 16, 1969, and quickly rose to the top of both the Billboard pop and R&B singles charts, peaking at No. 2 on the former, (behind Aquarius/Let the Sunshine In by The 5th Dimension), and marking their first No. 1 hit in the latter. Upon the song's release and ascent to success, Gordy threatened to sue the group for releasing it in an attempt to bring them back to Motown, but he eventually cancelled his threat, and in February 1970 the brothers became the first former Motown act to win a Grammy Award for Best R&B Vocal Performance by a Duo or Group.

== Chart history ==
=== Weekly charts ===
Chart (1969)	Peak position
Canada RPM Top Singles	3
France (IFOP)	9
UK	30
U.S. Billboard Hot 100	2
U.S. Billboard R&B	1
U.S. Cash Box Top 100	2

=== Year-end charts ===
Chart (1969)	Rank
Canada	48
US Billboard Hot 100	21
US Cash Box	37

== Cover versions and legacy ==
Over 60 artists have recorded their own version of the song.

- A version was recorded by Memphis soul singer Ann Peebles for her 1969 debut album This Is Ann Peebles.
- Saxophonist Lou Donaldson recorded an instrumental version on his 1969 album Hot Dog.
- In 1969 Atlantic recording artist Lotti Golden also recorded the song in a mash-up medley with "Sock It to Me Baby", to promote her Atlantic Records debut LP The medley included the only two covers that Golden recorded as an artist. In 2000, the medley featuring "It's Your Thing", was reissued in an Atlantic compilation, with Golden as the sole female artist in the line up.
- The song has been credited for being one of the first fully-fledged funk songs at the time that such artists as James Brown and Sly and the Family Stone brought their own funk anthems to the scene. Brown used the musical background from the song for the songs "It's My Thing (You Can't Tell Me Who to Sock It to)", an answer song by Marva Whitney, and Brown's own 1974 single, "My Thang".
- Led Zeppelin would often perform an instrumental of the song in a medley format with "Communication Breakdown". Led Zeppelin included a four-bar snippet during the opening song sequence of their Playhouse Theater performance on June 27, 1969.
- In 1969 The Temptations recorded the song for on their Puzzle People album.
- In 1970, jazz guitar player Grant Green included the song in his album Alive!
- The Jackson 5, who were not yet established artists, first performed the song at their television debut on the Miss Black America Pageant, later recording it during sessions for their 1970 album ABC. However, this recording remained unreleased until 1995's Soulsation! box set.
- Former Motown label-mates The Supremes and the Four Tops recorded a duet version in 1971 that remained unreleased until 2009.
- Adriano Celentano's "Prisencolinensinainciusol", which was released three years later in 1972, has a very similar feel and chord structure.
- Aretha Franklin recorded the song for her 1982 album Jump to It.
- The song also has been heavily sampled by hip hop acts, most famously by rap group Salt-N-Pepa and DC go-go band E.U., who sampled it for "Shake Your Thang" (1988).
- The 1989 album Girl You Know It's True by Milli Vanilli contains a cover of this song.
- Like many of their earlier singles, the song has been featured in commercials. Some Canadian commercials for the Ramada hotel chain have featured a cover version of "It's Your Thing", modified so the lyrics say "Do Your Thing" instead.
- Lou Donaldson's 1969 cover has also been sampled for multiple tracks, mostly hip-hop, including Ghetto Red Hot by Super Cat, Punks Jump Up to Get Beat Down by Brand Nubian, Bitties in the BK Lounge by De La Soul and Six Million Ways to Die by Funkmaster Flex.
- The song was covered by H-Town on the 1993 soundtrack album Addams Family Values: Music from the Motion Picture.
- It appears in the 1999 movie Muppets from Space, the 2007 film Superbad, the ending of the 2016 movie Sausage Party and the beginning of the 2017 movie Smurfs: The Lost Village, as well as in the teaser trailer for DreamWorks Animation's 2017 movie The Boss Baby.
- The song "Power" by Kanye West uses a sample from Cold Grits' instrumental cover of "It's Your Thing" in his 2010 album My Beautiful Dark Twisted Fantasy.
- in 2014, The Berman Brothers along with Studio Rio did a Bossa Nova of the song, in collaboration will The Isley Brothers as part of the soundtrack for the 2014 FIFA World Cup in Brazil titled: One Love, One Rhythm and part of their album Studio Rio present: The Brazil Connection.
- Walk the Moon covered the song on their 2015 Different Colors EP.
- It also appears in the English version of the adult animated film Bad Cat (2016).
- The song is covered by Peter Gallagher in Season 1 Episode 5 of Zoey's Extraordinary Playlist.
- It was the last song to be played by English DJ Janice Long on what would be her final radio show in her lifetime, for BBC Radio Wales on 9 December 2021. Long died 2 weeks later.
- Dave Matthews Band covered It’s Your Thing live in 2022 and in 2025, featuring Rashawn Ross on vocals

== Personnel ==
- Lead vocals by Ronald Isley
- Background vocals by O'Kelly Isley, Jr. and Rudolph Isley
- Written, arranged and composed by Ronald Isley, O'Kelly Isley, Jr. and Rudolph Isley
- Produced by The Isley Brothers
- Drums by Woody Woodson
- Bass by Ernie Isley
- Guitar by Charles "Skip" Pitts
- Piano by Herb Rooney
- Saxophone and arrangement by George Patterson
- Horns arranged by The Isley Brothers
