= Berman Brothers (producers) =

German songwriters

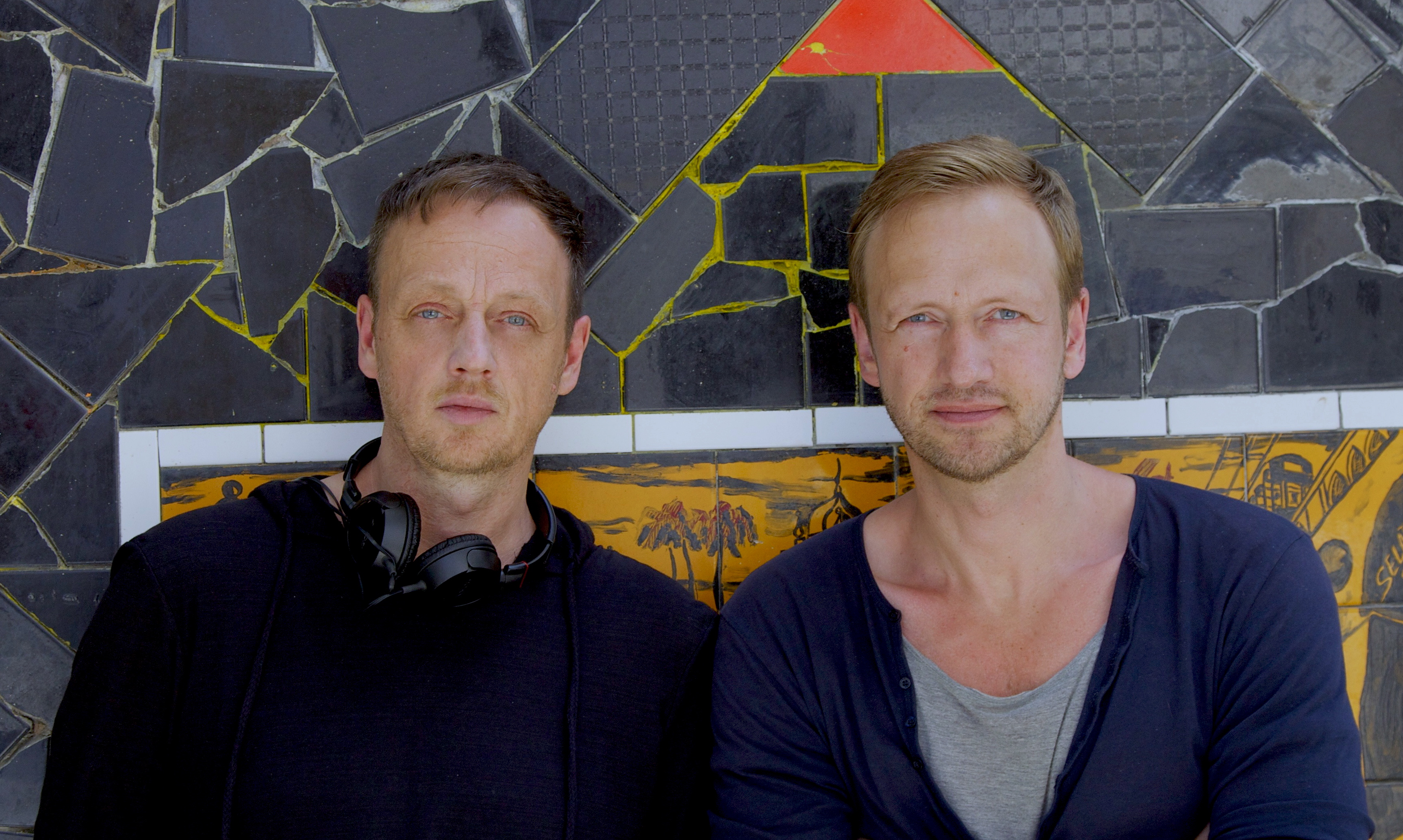

Background information
- Origin: Germany
- Genres: Pop, rock
- Occupation(s): Producers, songwriters
- Years active: 1993–present
- Members: Frank Bermann; Christian Bermann
- Website: bermanbrothers.com

The Berman Brothers are the record production duo of siblings Frank and Christian Berman.

== Early life ==
The Bermans grew up in Riesenbeck, Germany.

== Careers ==
In 2006, the Bermans created and co-produced the album Rhythms del Mundo, with Cuban musicians including Ibrahim Ferrer and Omara Portuondo of the Buena Vista Social Club, and US and UK artists such as U2, Coldplay, Sting, Jack Johnson, Maroon 5, Arctic Monkeys, Franz Ferdinand, Kaiser Chiefs, and others. Rhythms del Mundo was released in over 61 countries and received sales awards. The project is in aid of Artists Project Earth (APE), which lends support for natural disaster relief and climate change awareness.

The Berman Brothers have created remixes for Real McCoy and have produced records for Hanson, Baha Men, and Sophie B Hawkins.

In 2014, the Bermans released Studio Rio Presents: The Brazil Connection; it sets the music of jazz classics to samba and bossa nova arrangements. Artists include Billie Holiday, Marvin Gaye, Aretha Franklin, Nina Simone, and Sly & The Family Stone. The Studio Rio version of "It's Your Thing" by The Isley Brothers was featured on the 2014 Fifa World Cup Album One Love, One Rhythm. The song was also used during the ESPN soccer World Cup coverage.

Their music has been used in television and film advertisements for Nissan, Casio, Lufthansa, Honda, and Lexus. Their songs have been used in the films Miss Congeniality and Parent Trap as well as in the television series House and The Sopranos.
