= Jagged Edge discography =

- Studio albums: 11
- Compilation albums: 3
- Video albums: 1

The following discography is a comprehensive collection of albums, singles and guest appearances by Jagged Edge.

== Albums ==
=== Studio albums ===
List of albums, with selected chart positions and certifications
| Title | Album details | Peak chart positions | | | | | | Certifications |
| Title | Album details | US | US R&B | AUS | GER | NZ | UK | Certifications |
|---|---|---|---|---|---|---|---|---|
| A Jagged Era | Released: October 21, 1997; Label: So So Def, Columbia; Format: CD, LP, cassette, digital download | 104 | 19 | — | — | — | — | RIAA: Gold |
| J.E. Heartbreak | Released: January 18, 2000; Label: So So Def, Columbia; Format: CD, LP, cassette, digital download | 8 | 1 | — | — | — | 183 | RIAA: 2× Platinum; BPI: Silver |
| Jagged Little Thrill | Released: July 3, 2001; Label: So So Def, Columbia; Format: CD, LP, cassette, digital download | 3 | 1 | 14 | 75 | 37 | 85 | RIAA: Platinum; ARIA: Gold; BPI: Silver |
| Hard | Released: October 14, 2003; Label: So So Def, Sony Urban; Format: CD, LP, digital download | 3 | 1 | — | — | — | 82 | RIAA: Gold; BPI: Gold |
| Jagged Edge | Released: May 9, 2006; Label: Sony Urban, Columbia; Format: CD, LP, digital download | 4 | 2 | — | — | — | 104 | |
| Baby Makin' Project | Released: September 25, 2007; Label: So So Def, Island; Format: CD, LP, digital download | 8 | 3 | — | — | — | — | |
| The Remedy | Released: June 21, 2011; Label: Slip-N-Slide, Five 81; Format: CD, digital download | 35 | 7 | — | — | — | — | |
| J.E. Heartbreak 2 | Released: October 27, 2014; Label: So So Def, Hard Case Records, Primary Wave, BMG Rights Management; Format: CD, digital download | 28 | 3 | — | — | — | — | |
| Layover | Released: July 9, 2017; Label: HardCase Records; Format: digital download | — | 44 | — | — | — | — | |
| A Jagged Love Story | Released: June 30, 2020; Label: HardCase Records; Format: digital download | — | — | — | — | — | — | |
| All Original Parts: Volume 1 | Released: February 14, 2025; Label: Jagged Edge; Format: digital download | — | — | — | — | — | — | |
"—" denotes a recording that did not chart or was not released in that territory.

=== Compilation albums ===
List of albums, with selected chart positions
| Title | Album details | Peak chart positions |
| Title | Album details | US R&B |
|---|---|---|
| The Hits | Released: November 21, 2006; Label: So So Def, Columbia; Format: CD, digital download | 40 |
| Playlist: The Very Best of Jagged Edge | Released: October 30, 2015; Label: Legacy Recordings; Format: CD, digital download | 37 |
| Greatest Hits | Released: November 11, 2016; Label: X-Ray Records; Format: digital download | — |

=== Video albums ===
List of albums, with selected chart positions and certifications
| Title | Album details | Peak chart positions | | Certifications |
| Title | Album details | US | US R&B | Certifications |
|---|---|---|---|---|
| The Ultimate Video Collection | Released: April 27, 2004; Label: So So Def, Columbia; Format: CD/DVD | 131 | 34 | RIAA: Gold |

== Singles ==
=== As lead artist ===
List of singles, with selected chart positions and certifications, showing year released and album name
| Title | Year | Peak chart positions | | | | | | | | | | Certifications | Album |
| Title | Year | US | US R&B | AUS | CAN | FRA | GER | NL | NZ | SWI | UK | Certifications | Album |
|---|---|---|---|---|---|---|---|---|---|---|---|---|---|
| "The Way That You Talk" (featuring Da Brat) | 1997 | 65 | 34 | — | — | — | — | — | — | — | — | | A Jagged Era |
| "I Gotta Be" | 1997 | 23 | 11 | — | — | — | — | — | — | — | — | | A Jagged Era |
| "Keys to the Range" (featuring Jermaine Dupri) | 1999 | — | 55 | — | — | — | — | — | — | — | — | | J.E. Heartbreak |
| "He Can't Love U" | 1999 | 15 | 3 | — | — | — | — | — | — | — | — | RIAA: Gold | J.E. Heartbreak |
| "Let's Get Married" | 2000 | 11 | 1 | 2 | 10 | — | 61 | — | — | — | 197 | ARIA: 2× Platinum; BPI: Silver; RMNZ: Gold | J.E. Heartbreak |
| "Promise" | 2000 | 9 | 1 | 2 | — | — | 83 | — | — | — | — | ARIA: 2× Platinum; BPI: Silver; RMNZ: Gold | J.E. Heartbreak |
| "Where the Party At" (featuring Nelly) | 2001 | 3 | 1 | 13 | 17 | 49 | 37 | 29 | 33 | 45 | 25 | ARIA: Gold; BPI: Silver; RMNZ: Platinum | Jagged Little Thrill |
| "Goodbye" | 2001 | 58 | 18 | — | — | — | — | — | — | — | — | | Jagged Little Thrill |
| "I Got It 2" (featuring Nas) | 2001 | 103 | 34 | — | — | — | — | — | — | — | — | | Jagged Little Thrill |
| "Walked Outta Heaven" | 2003 | 6 | 2 | — | — | — | — | — | 13 | — | 21 | | Hard |
| "What's It Like" | 2004 | 85 | 32 | — | — | — | — | — | — | — | 179 | | Hard |
| "So Amazing" (featuring Julio Voltio) | 2005 | — | 84 | — | — | — | — | — | — | — | — | | Jagged Edge |
| "Good Luck Charm" | 2006 | 73 | 13 | — | — | — | — | — | — | — | — | RIAA: Gold | Jagged Edge |
| "Season's Change" (featuring John Legend) | 2006 | — | — | — | — | — | — | — | — | — | — | | Jagged Edge |
| "Stunnas" (featuring Jermaine Dupri) | 2006 | — | 121 | — | — | — | — | — | — | — | — | | Jagged Edge |
| "Put a Little Umph in It" (featuring Ashanti) | 2007 | 113 | 49 | — | — | — | — | — | — | — | — | | Baby Makin' Project |
| "Tip of My Tongue" (featuring Trina and Gucci Mane) | 2010 | — | 51 | — | — | — | — | — | — | — | — | | Non-album singles |
| "You Look Good With Me" | 2010 | — | — | — | — | — | — | — | — | — | — | | Non-album singles |
| "Lay You Down" | 2010 | — | 89 | — | — | — | — | — | — | — | — | | The Remedy |
| "Baby" | 2011 | — | 58 | — | — | — | — | — | — | — | — | | The Remedy |
| "Flow Through My Veins" | 2011 | — | — | — | — | — | — | — | — | — | — | | The Remedy |
| "Love On You" | 2012 | — | — | — | — | — | — | — | — | — | — | | The Remedy |
| "Hope" | 2014 | — | — | — | — | — | — | — | — | — | — | | J.E. Heartbreak 2 |
| "Peanut Budder" | 2017 | — | — | — | — | — | — | — | — | — | — | | Layover |
| "He Ain't Shit" (featuring Ty Dolla Sign) | 2018 | — | — | — | — | — | — | — | — | — | — | | Non-album single |
| "Closest Thing To Perfect" | 2020 | — | — | — | — | — | — | — | — | — | — | | A Jagged Love Story |
| "Genie" | 2020 | — | — | — | — | — | — | — | — | — | — | | A Jagged Love Story |
| "Decided" | 2020 | — | — | — | — | — | — | — | — | — | — | | A Jagged Love Story |
| "Season of Us" | 2020 | — | — | — | — | — | — | — | — | — | — | | Non-album singles |
| "Let Me Know" (with Sage Harris) | 2021 | — | — | — | — | — | — | — | — | — | — | | Non-album singles |
| "Inseparable" | 2022 | — | — | — | — | — | — | — | — | — | — | | Non-album singles |
| "Just Might Get It" | 2025 | — | — | — | — | — | — | — | — | — | — | | All Original Parts: Volume 1 |
"—" denotes a title that did not chart, or was not released in that territory.

=== As featured performer ===
List of singles, with selected chart positions, showing year released and album name
| Title | Year | Peak chart positions | | | | Certifications | Album |
| Title | Year | US | US R&B | US Rap | UK | Certifications | Album |
|---|---|---|---|---|---|---|---|
| "Puppy Love" (Lil' Bow Wow featuring Jagged Edge) | 2001 | 75 | 27 | — | — | | Beware of Dog |
| "Ghetto Girls" (Lil' Bow Wow featuring Jagged Edge) | 2001 | 91 | 40 | 14 | — | | Beware of Dog |
| "Thank You" (Lil' Bow Wow featuring Jagged Edge) | 2001 | 93 | 45 | 21 | — | | Doggy Bag |
| "Don't Mess with My Man" (Nivea featuring Brian and Brandon Casey of Jagged Edge) | 2002 | 8 | 4 | — | 41 | RMNZ: Platinum | Nivea |
| "Trade It All, Pt. 2" (Fabolous featuring P. Diddy and Jagged Edge) | 2002 | 20 | 14 | 8 | — | | Street Dreams |
| "My Baby" (Bow Wow featuring Jagged Edge) | 2003 | 42 | 17 | 15 | — | | Unleashed |
| "Choosin" (Too Short featuring Jagged Edge) | 2003 | — | 61 | — | — | | Married to the Game |
| "Nasty Girl" (The Notorious B.I.G. featuring Diddy, Nelly, Jagged Edge and Avery Storm) | 2005 | 44 | 20 | 9 | 1 | BPI: 2× Platinum; RMNZ: Platinum | Duets: The Final Chapter |
| "I Really Wanna Know You" (DJ Clue? featuring Jagged Edge and Fabolous) | 2006 | — | 53 | 25 | — | | The Professional 3 |
| "The Trade" (Tory Lanez featuring Jagged Edge and Jermaine Dupri) | 2019 | 101 | 48 | — | — | | Chixtape 5 |
"—" denotes a recording that did not chart or was not released in that territory.

== Guest appearances ==
List of non-single guest appearances, with other performing artists, showing year released and album name
| Title | Year | Other artist(s) | Album |
|---|---|---|---|
| "Be My Lady" | 1998 | Lord Tariq and Peter Gunz, Jermaine Dupri | Make It Reign |
| "Is It You" | 1998 | DJ Nabs, Ludacris | In The Lab With DJ Nabs - The Live Album |
| "He Likes" | 1999 | Cha Cha | Dear Diary |
| "You Can Always Go" | 2000 | Blaque | Big Momma's House (soundtrack) |
| "Freaky Thangs" | 2001 | Ludacris, Twista | Word of Mouf |
| "Yours & Mine" | 2001 | Jermaine Dupri | Instructions |
| "Let's Stay Together (Together Forever)" | 2001 | Run–D.M.C. | Crown Royal |
| "Ride On" | 2002 | Kool G Rap | —N/a |
| "All Out of Love" | 2002 | {n/a} | Bad Company (soundtrack) |
| "Choosin'" | 2003 | Too Short, Jazze Pha | Married to the Game |
| "I'm a Rider" | 2003 | Kokane, Snoop Dogg | Dr. Jekyll and Mr. Kane |
| "Project Princess" | 2005 | Tony Yayo | Thoughts of a Predicate Felon |
| "2 Fingers" | 2005 | David Banner | Certified |
| "On Your Mind" | 2006 | Pimp C, Big Zak, Ali & Gipp | Pimpalation |
| "The One" | 2006 | Daz Dillinger | So So Gangsta |
| "Kick It Like That" | 2006 | Styles P | Time Is Money |
| "Damn Girl" | 2006 | Bump J, Twista | Nothing to Lose (unreleased) |
| "Caught Up In Tha Game" | 2007 | Daz Dillinger, Joe Budden | Gangsta Party |
| "I Remember" | 2007 | TQ | Like Mike (soundtrack) and Gemini |
| "I Don't Know" | 2008 | TQ | Paradise |
| "In The Bedroom" | 2008 | Bohagon | Crunk In HD |
| "Quit Flossin'" | 2009 | Playaz Circle | Flight 360: The Takeoff |
| "K.I.M. (Keep it Movin')" | 2011 | The Boy Boy Young Mess, Keak da Sneak & PSD | Da Bidness 2 |
| "MVP" | 2011 | Gucci Mane | Writings On The Wall 2 |
| "Smoking While We Drive" | 2011 | Snoop Dogg, Daz Dillinger, Bohagon | —N/a |
| "Brokken" | 2012 | Two Inch Punch | —N/a |
| "Celebration" (Remix) | 2013 | Jermaine Dupri, Dondria, Da Brat, Bow Wow, Fresco Kane | —N/a |
| "Straight Up" | 2015 | Ty Dolla Sign | Free TC |
| "Don't Know Why" | 2017 | Cyhi the Prynce | No Dope On Sundays |
| "Both Of Us" | 2017 | 112 | Q, Mike, Slim, Daron |
| "Money And Power" | 2017 | Jay-Payd | —N/a |
| "Special" | 2018 | Jacquees | 4275 Ghetto Angels (Remix) - No Cap, Lil Durk - The Hood Dictionary The Trade - Tory Lanez, Jermaine Dupri - Chixtape 5 |
