= Soul Train Music Award for Best R&B/Soul Single – Group, Band or Duo =

Annual US music award

This page lists the winners and nominees for the Soul Train Music Award for Best R&B/Soul Single – Group, Band or Duo. The award was given out every year since the first annual Soul Train Music Awards in 1987. From 1989 to 1992 the award was known as R&B/Urban Contemporary Single – Group, Band or Duo. When the Soul Train Music Awards returned in 2009 the categories of Best R&B/Soul Single – Group, Band or Duo and Best R&B/Soul Album – Group, Band or Duo were consolidated into the Best R&B/Soul Male Artist and Best R&B/Soul Female Artist categories, depending on group gender. Boyz II Men and TLC have won the most awards in this category, with a total of two wins each.

== Winners and nominees ==
Winners are listed first and highlighted in bold.

=== 1980s ===
Year	Artist	Single	Ref
1987
1987	**Cameo**	**"Word Up"**	
1987	Atlantic Starr	"Secret Lovers"	
1987	Timex Social Club	"Rumors"	
1987	Dionne Warwick and Friends	"That's What Friends Are For"	
1988
1988	**LeVert**	**"Casanova"**	
1988	Atlantic Starr	"Always"	
1988	Earth, Wind & Fire	"System of Survival"	
1988	The Whispers	"Rock Steady"	
1989
1989	**E.U.**	**"Da Butt"**	
1989	Rob Base and DJ E-Z Rock	"It Takes Two"	
1989	Guy	"Groove Me"	
1989	New Edition	"Can You Stand the Rain"	

=== 1990s ===
Year	Artist	Single	Ref
1990
1990	**Soul II Soul**	**"Keep On Movin'"**	
1990	Guy	"I Like"	
1990	Surface	"Shower Me with Your Love"	
1990	Sweet Obsession	"Cash"	
1991
1991	**En Vogue**	**"Hold On"**	
1991	After 7	"Ready or Not"	
1991	Bell Biv DeVoe	"Poison"	
1991	Quincy Jones (featuring El DeBarge, Al B Sure!, James Ingram and Barry White)	"The Secret Garden (Sweet Seduction Suite)"	
1992
1992	**Color Me Badd**	**"I Wanna Sex You Up"**	
1992	Boyz II Men	"It's So Hard to Say Goodbye to Yesterday"	
1992	Jodeci	"Forever My Lady"	
1992	Sounds of Blackness	"Optimistic"	
1993
1993	**Boyz II Men**	**"Please Don't Go"**	
1993	Arrested Development	"Tennessee"	
1993	En Vogue	"My Lovin' (You're Never Gonna Get It)"	
1993	Jodeci	"Come and Talk to Me"	
1994
1994	**Jodeci**	**"Lately"**	
1994	H-Town	"Knockin' Da Boots	
1994	Tony! Toni! Toné!	"Anniversary"	
1995
1995	**Boyz II Men**	**"I'll Make Love to You"**	
1995	69 Boyz	"Tootsee Roll"	
1995	Blackstreet	"Before I Let You Go"	
1995	Bossman and Blakjak	"Much Love"	
1996
1996	**TLC**	**"Waterfalls"**	
1996	Boyz II Men	"Water Runs Dry"	
1996	Groove Theory	"Tell Me"	
1996	Jodeci	"Love U 4 Life"	
1997
1997	**Blackstreet (featuring Dr. Dre and Queen Pen)**	**"No Diggity"**	
1997	112	"Only You"	
1997	AZ Yet	"Last Night"	
1997	Mint Condition	"What Kind of Man Would I Be?"	
1998
1998	**Dru Hill**	**"In My Bed"**	
1998	Destiny's Child	"No, No, No"	
1998	Kirk Franklin and God's Property	"Stomp"	
1998	LSG	"My Body"	
1998	Puff Daddy and Faith Evans (featuring 112)	"I'll Be Missing You"	
1999
1999	**Next**	**"Too Close"**	
1999	Brandy and Monica	"The Boy is Mine"	
1999	K-Ci & JoJo	"All My Life"	
1999	The Temptations	"Stay"	

=== 2000s ===
Year	Artist	Single	Ref
2000
2000	**TLC**	**"No Scrubs"**	
2000	Destiny's Child	"Bills, Bills, Bills"	
2000	Dru Hill	"Beauty"	
2000	Ideal	"Get Gone"	
2001
2001	**Jagged Edge**	**"Let's Get Married"**	
2001	Destiny's Child	"Independent Women, Part I"	
2001	Whitney Houston and Deborah Cox	"Same Script, Different Cast"	
2001	Lucy Pearl	"Dance Tonight"	
2002
2002	**The Isley Brothers Featuring Ronald Isley**	**"Contagious"**	
2002	Destiny's Child	"Survivor"	
2002	Jagged Edge with Nelly	"Where the Party At"	
2002	'NSYNC	"Gone"	
2003
2003	**B2K (featuring P. Diddy)**	**"Bump, Bump, Bump"**	
2003	Dru Hill	"I Should Be..."	
2003	Floetry	"Floetic"	
2003	TLC	"Girl Talk"	
2004
2004	**Floetry**	**"Say Yes"**	
2004	B2K	"Girlfriend"	
2004	The Isley Brothers Featuring Ronald Isley and JS	"Busted"	
2004	Jagged Edge	"Walked Outta Heaven"	
2005
2005	**Usher and Alicia Keys**	**"My Boo"**	
2005	Destiny's Child	"Lose My Breath"	
2005	New Edition	"Hot 2Nite"	
2005	Luther Vandross and Beyoncé	"The Closer I Get to You"	
2006
2006	**Destiny's Child**	**"Cater 2 U"**	
2006	Floetry (featuring Common)	"Supastar"	
2006	Pussycat Dolls (featuring Busta Rhymes)	"Don't Cha"	
2006	Nina Sky (featuring Pitbull)	"Turnin' Me On"	
2007
2007	**Gnarls Barkley**	**"Crazy"**	
2007	The Isley Brothers Featuring Ronald Isley	"Just Came Here to Chill"	
2007	Jagged Edge	"Good Luck Charm"	
2007	The Pussycat Dolls (featuring Avant)	"Stickwitu"	
