= Soul Train Music Award for Best R&B/Soul Album – Group, Band or Duo =

Annual US music award

This page lists the winners and nominees for the Soul Train Music Award for Best R&B/Soul Album – Group, Band or Duo. The award was retired during the 2007 ceremony, but during its awarding it has had several names including Best R&B/Urban Contemporary Album – Group, Band or Duo, Album of the Year – Group, Band or Duo and Best Album – Group, Band or Duo. New Edition, The Isley Brothers, B2K and TLC have all won the most awards in this category, with a total of two.

== Winners and nominees ==
Winners are listed first and highlighted in bold.

=== 1980s ===
Year	Artist	Album	Ref
1987	**Cameo**	**Word Up!**	
1987	Atlantic Starr	As the Band Turns	
1987	Kool & the Gang	Forever	
1987	Run–D.M.C.	Raising Hell	
1988	**LeVert**	**The Big Throwdown**	
1988	Earth, Wind & Fire	Touch the World	
1988	Gladys Knight & the Pips	All Our Love	
1988	The Whispers	Just Gets Better with Time	
1989	**New Edition**	**Heart Break**	
1989	Guy	Guy	
1989	LeVert	Just Coolin'	
1989	Tony! Toni! Toné!	Who?	

=== 1990s ===
Year	Artist	Album	Ref
1990	**Soul II Soul**	**Club Classics Vol. One**	
1990	Heavy D and the Boyz	Big Tyme	
1990	Maze and Frankie Beverly	Silky Soul	
1990	Milli Vanilli	Girl You Know It's True	
1991	**Bell Biv Devoe**	**Poison**	
1991	En Vogue	Born to Sing	
1991	Tony! Toni! Toné!	The Revival	
1991	The Whispers	More of the Night	
1992	**Jodeci**	**Forever My Lady**	
1992	Guy	The Future	
1992	Prince and the New Power Generation	Diamonds and Pearls	
1992	BeBe & CeCe Winans	Different Lifestyles	
1993	**En Vogue**	**Funky Divas**	
1993	Arrested Development	3 Years, 5 Months and 2 Days in the Life Of...	
1993	Prince and the New Power Generation	Love Symbol Album	
1993	TLC	Ooooooohhh... On the TLC Tip	
1994	**Silk**	**Lose Control**	
1994	Earth, Wind & Fire	Millennium	
1994	Intro	Intro	
1994	Tony! Toni! Toné!	Sons of Soul	
1995	**Boyz II Men**	**II**	
1995	Blackstreet	Blackstreet	
1995	Jodeci	Diary of a Mad Band	
1995	Zhané	Pronounced Jah-Nay	
1996	**TLC**	**CrazySexyCool**	
1996	Jodeci	The Show, the After Party, the Hotel	
1996	Solo	Solo	
1996	Xscape	Off the Hook	
1997	**New Edition**	**Home Again**	
1997	112	112	
1997	The Isley Brothers	Mission to Please	
1997	Mint Condition	Definition of a Band	
1998	**Dru Hill**	**Dru Hill**	
1998	Boyz II Men	Evolution	
1998	Kirk Franklin and God's Property	God's Property from Kirk Franklin's Nu Nation	
1998	Puff Daddy & the Family	No Way Out	
1999	**The Temptations**	**Phoenix Rising**	
1999	Dru Hill	Enter the Dru	
1999	LSG	Levert, Sweat, Gill	
1999	Outkast	Aquemini	

=== 2000s ===
Year	Artist	Album	Ref
2000	**TLC**	**FanMail**	
2000	Destiny's Child	The Writing's on the Wall	
2000	K-Ci & JoJo	It's Real	
2000	Les Nubians	Princesses Nubiennes	
2001	**Jagged Edge**	**J.E. Heartbreak**	
2001	Mary Mary	Thankful	
2001	Next	Welcome II Nextasy	
2001	Lucy Pearl	Lucy Pearl	
2002	**The Isley Brothers**	**Eternal**	
2002	112	Part III	
2002	Destiny's Child	Survivor	
2002	Jagged Edge	Jagged Little Thrill	
2003	**B2K**	**B2K**	
2003	Boyz II Men	Full Circle	
2003	Floetry	Floetic	
2003	R. Kelly and Jay Z	Best of Both Worlds	
2004	**B2K**	**Pandemonium!**	
2004	The Isley Brothers	Body Kiss	
2004	Kindred the Family Soul	Surrender to Love	
2004	The Neptunes	Neptunes Presents Clones	
2005	**Destiny's Child**	**Destiny Fulfilled**	
2005	112	Hot & Wet	
2005	Boyz II Men	Throwback, Vol. 1	
2005	New Edition	One Love	
2006	**The Black Eyed Peas**	**Monkey Business**	
2006	112	Pleasure & Pain	
2006	Earth, Wind & Fire	Illumination	
2006	Mint Condition	Livin' the Luxury Brown	
2007	**The Isley Brothers**	**Baby Makin' Music**	
2007	Gnarls Barkley	St. Elsewhere	
2007	Danity Kane	Danity Kane	
2007	Jagged Edge	Jagged Edge	
