= The Hits (Jagged Edge album) =

Greatest hits album by Jagged Edge
- Released: November 21, 2006
- Length: 44:14
- Labels: Columbia; Sony Urban
- Producers: Jermaine Dupri, Bryan Michael Cox

Jagged Edge chronology
Jagged Edge (2006)	The Hits (2006)	Baby Makin' Project (2007)

The Hits is a compilation album by American R&B group Jagged Edge. It was released on November 21, 2006 through Columbia Records and Sony Urban Music. It includes their biggest singles, plus a few album tracks from their 2006 self-titled release, which had been released six months earlier.

== Critical reception ==
Professional ratings
Review scores
Source	Rating
AllMusic	3.5/5 stars

AllMusic editor Andy Kellman found that "this compilation will satisfy only those who are set on obtaining the outright smashes and nothing else. It has to annoy the group that this disc was released only six months after their self-titled fifth album, and that the compilers didn't even consider some of the best album cuts. Regardless, The Hits is a decent introduction to a group that made up for its lack of jaw-dropping greatness with consistently good output."

== Commercial performance ==
The Hits debuted and peaked at number 40 on the US Top R&B/Hip-Hop Albums chart.

== Track listing ==
The Hits track listing
No.	Title	Writer(s)	Producer(s)	Length
1.	"Good Luck Charm"	Brandon Casey; Brian Casey; Chad "Dr. Ceuss" Elliott; Bobby Johnson; Rod Richards; John Hosea Williams	Elliott; Cheese; Donvito	4:24
2.	"Promise"	Brandon Casey; Brian Casey; Bert Young; Jermaine Dupri; Bryan Michael Cox; Gary "Gizzo" Smith	Dupri; Cox	4:06
3.	"Let's Get Married"	Brandon Casey; Brian Casey; Dupri; Cox	Dupri; Cox	4:24
4.	"Walked Outta Heaven"	Brandon Casey; Brian Casey; Cox	Cox	4:30
5.	"Where the Party At" (Dupri Remix featuring Jermaine Dupri, Da Brat, R.O.C., Lil' Bow Wow & Tigah)	Brandon Casey; Brian Casey; Dupri; Bryan-Michael Cox	Dupri; Cox^{[a]}	3:52
6.	"He Can't Love U"	Brandon Casey; Brian Casey; Cox	Cox	4:04
7.	"I Gotta Be"	Brandon Casey; Brian Casey; Dupri; Manuel Seal	Dupri; Seal	3:28
8.	"Hopefully"	Brandon Casey; Brian Casey	Brandon Casey; Brian Casey; Spruell^{[a]}	3:42
9.	"Let's Get Married" (Remarqable Remix featuring Jermaine Dupri & Run of Run DMC)	Brandon Casey; Brian Casey; Dupri; Cox	Dupri; Cox	4:24
10.	"Stunnas" (featuring Jermaine Dupri)	Balewa Muhammed; Candice Nelson; Ezekiel Lewis; Hakim Young	Pitch Black The Clutch	4:40
11.	"Season's Change" (featuring John Legend)	Brandon Casey; Brian Casey; Dwayne Nesmith; Pierre Medor	Brandon Casey; Brian Casey; Tha Corna Boyz^{[a]}	3:46
Total length:				44:14

Notes

- ^{^[a]} signifies co-producer

== Charts ==
Weekly chart performance for The Hits
Chart (2006)	Peak position
US Top R&B/Hip-Hop Albums (Billboard)	40
