= Ocean's 7 production discography =

This is the production discography of Ocean's 7.

== Production discography ==
=== 1999 ===
Jagged Edge – J.E. Heartbreak

- 01. "Heartbreak" (co-wrote by Bryan-Michael Cox)
- 02. "Did She Say" (co-wrote by Jermaine Dupri and Bryan-Michael Cox)
- 03. "He Can't Love U" (co-wrote by Bryan-Michael Cox)
- 04 "What You Tryin' to Do" (co-wrote by Bryan-Michael Cox)
- 05. "Girl Is Mine" (featuring Ja Rule & Jermaine Dupri)
- 06. "Healing" (co-wrote by Bryan-Michael Cox)
- 07 "Let's Get Married" (co-wrote by Bryan-Michael Cox)
- 10. "Promise" (co-wrote by Jermaine Dupri and Bryan-Michael Cox)
- 11. "Keys to the Range" (featuring Jermaine Dupri)

(Produced by Jermaine Dupri and Bryan-Michael Cox)

Toni Braxton – The Heat

- 04. Just Be a Man About It (co-wrote by Bryan-Michael Cox and Johnta Austin)

=== 2001 ===
Usher – 8701

- 05. "U Got It Bad" (co-wrote by Usher Raymond IV, Jermaine Dupri, and Bryan-Michael Cox)

(Produced by Jermaine Dupri and Bryan-Michael Cox)

- 06. "If I Want To" (co-wrote by Usher Raymond IV, Jermaine Dupri, and Bryan-Michael Cox)

(produced by Jermaine Dupri, Bryan-Michael Cox, and Babyface)

- 08. "I Can't Let U Go" (Produced by Jermaine Dupri and Bryan-Michael Cox)
- 13. "Good Ol' Ghetto" (Produced by Jermaine Dupri and Bryan-Michael Cox)
- 14. "U-Turn" (Produced by Jermaine Dupri and Bryan-Michael Cox)

Bow Wow - Beware of Dog

- 02. "The Future" (featuring R.O.C.) (co-written by Bryan-Michael Cox and Jermaine Dupril)

(Produced by Jermaine Dupri)

- 04 Puppy Love (featuring Jagged Edge) (co-written by Bryan-Michael Cox and Jermaine Dupri)

(Produced by Jermaine Dupri)

=== 2002 ===
Mariah Carey – Charmbracelet

- 03. "The One" (co-written by Jermaine Dupri and Bryan-Michael Cox)
- 09. "You Had Your Chance" (co-written by Jermaine Dupri and Bryan-Michael Cox)
- 16. "Miss You" (featuring Jadakiss) (co-written by Jermaine Dupri and Bryan-Michael Cox)

(Produced by Mariah Carey, Jermaine Dupri, and Bryan-Michael Cox)

Monica – All Eyez on Me

- 03. "U Should've Known Better" (Monica, Jermaine Dupri, and Harold Lilly)
- 04. "Too Hood" – (featuring Jermaine Dupri)
- 09. "If U Were The Girl"
- (Produced by Jermaine Dupri and Bryan-Michael Cox)

=== 2004 ===
Usher – Confessions

(Produced by Jermaine Dupri and Bryan-Michael Cox)

- 05. "Confessions, Part II"
- 06. "Burn"
- 15. "Do it to Me"
- "Confessions, Pt. 2 (Remix)" (ft. Kanye West, Twista, Shyne, and Jermaine Dupri)

=== 2005 ===
Mariah Carey – Emancipation of Mimi

- 01. "It's Like That" (Produced by Jermaine Dupri and co-wrote by Johnta Austin)
- 02. "We Belong Together" (Produced by Jermaine Dupri and co-wrote by Johnta Austin)
- 03. "Shake It Off" (Co-Produced and co-written by Jermaine Dupri, Bryan-Michael Cox and Johnta Austin)
- 07. "Get Your Number" (Co-Produced and co-written by Jermaine Dupri and Johnta Austin)
- 15. "Don't Forget About Us" (Co-Produced and co-written by Jermaine Dupri, Bryan-Michael Cox and Johnta Austin)
- 16. "Makin' It Last All Night (What It Do?)" (Co-Produced and co-written by Jermaine Dupri, Bryan-Michael Cox and Johnta Austin)

=== 2006 ===
Monica – The Makings of Me

- 01. "Everytime Tha Beat Drop" (featuring Dem Franchize Boyz)
- 05. "Hell No (Leave Home)" (featuring Twista)
- 04. "Why Her"
- 09. "Getaway"

Bow Wow – The Price of Fame

- 03. 4 Corners (ft Lil Wayne, Pimp C, Lil Scrappy & Short Dawg) (Produced by Jermaine Dupri)
- 04. "Outta My System" (ft T-Pain & Johnta Austin) (Produced by Jermaine Dupri and Bryan-Michael Cox)
- 05. How You Move It (Produced by Jermaine Dupri)
- 06. "Shortie Like Mine" (ft Chris Brown & Johnta Austin) (Produced and co-written by Jermaine Dupri, Bryan-Michael Cox and Johnta Austin)
- 07. Don't Know About That (ft Young Capone & Cocaine J) (Produced by Jermaine Dupri)
- 08. Tell Me (Produced by Jermaine Dupri)
- 09. Damn Thing (ft Da Brat) (Produced by Jermaine Dupri)
- 10. Bet That (Produced by Jermaine Dupri)

=== 2008 ===
Mariah Carey – E=MC²

- 03. "Cruise Control" (featuring Damian Marley)
- 07. "Love Story"
- 09. "Last Kiss"
- 10. "Thanx 4 Nothin'"

Usher – Here I Stand

- 08. "Something Special" (Produced by Jermaine Dupri with No I.D. and Manuel Seal)
- 10. "Best Thing" (ft. Jay-Z)
- 11. "Before I Met You" (Co-wrote by Bryan Michael-Cox and Johnta Austin)
- 14. "What's a Man to Do" (Co-wrote by Johnta Austin)
- 19. "Chivalry (Bonus Track)" (ft. Jermaine Dupri)

=== 2009 ===
Trey Songz – Ready

- 04. "I Need a Girl" (co-wrote by Johnta Austin)
- 05. One Love (co-wrote by Bryan Michael-Cox and Johnta Austin)

=== 2010 ===
Monica – Still Standing

- 09. "Love All Over Me" (Produced with Bryan-Michael Cox)

Mariah Carey – Merry Christmas II You

- 02. "Oh Santa!"
- 07. "Here Comes Santa Claus"
- 14. "Oh Santa (Remix)"

(Produced with Bryan-Michael Cox & Mariah Carey)

Usher – Raymond v. Raymond

- 09. "Foolin' Around" (co-wrote by Johnta Austin, Bryan-Michael Cox, Jermaine Dupri, and Usher Raymond IV)

=== 2012 ===
Monica – New Life

- 09. "Amazing" (Produced with Bryan-Michael Cox)

=== 2014 ===
Mariah Carey – Me. I Am Mariah... The Elusive Chanteuse

- 06. "Make It Look Good"

(Produced by Jermaine Dupri and Bryan-Michael Cox)

- 08. "You Don't Know What to Do" (feat. Wale)

(Produced by Jermaine Dupri and Bryan-Michael Cox)

- 09. "Supernatural"
- 13. "One More Try"
- 14. "Heavenly (No Ways Tired / Can't Give Up Now)"

(Produced with Bryan-Michael Cox)

Jagged Edge – J.E. Heartbreak 2

- 03. "Familiar"
- 04. "Hope"
- 05. "Things I Do For You"
- 08. "Wanna Be (Romeo)"
- 09. "Getting Over You"

(Produced by Jermaine Dupri and Bryan-Michael Cox)

=== 2016 ===
Drake - Views

- 09. - "Faithful" (co-wrote by Johnta Austin and Bryan-Michael Cox)

=== 2019 ===
Johntá Austin – Love, Sex, & Religion

- 03. "Born Again" (Produced by Jermaine Dupri and Bryan-Michael Cox)
- 04. "Love Culture" (Produced by Bryan-Michael Cox)
- 06. "Ride" (Produced by Bryan-Michael Cox)
- 09. "Making Love to God" (Produced by Jermaine Dupri and Bryan-Michael Cox)

Tory Lanez - Chixtape 5

- 13. "Still Waiting" - (co-wrote by Johnta Austin and Trey Songz)

=== 2020 ===
Usher – TBD

- "Don't Waste My Time" featuring Ella Mai (co-written by Usher Raymond IV, Jermaine Dupri, and Bryan-Michael Cox)

(Produced by Jermaine Dupri and Bryan-Michael Cox)

- SexBeat (Written by Jermaine Dupri)

Trey Songz – Back Home

- 18. "All This Love" (co-written by T. Neverson, N. Neverson, Troy Taylor, Eric Hudson, and Johnta Austin)

(Co-produced by Johnta Austin)

=== 2021 ===
Ari Lennox – "Pressure" (co-wrote by Jermaine Dupri, Bryan-Michael Cox, and Johnta Austin)
