= Soul Train Music Award for Best R&B/Soul Album – Female =

Annual US music award

This page lists the winners and nominees for the Soul Train Music Award for Best R&B/Soul Album – Female. The award was retired during the 2007 ceremony, but during its awarding it has had several names including Best R&B/Urban Contemporary Album – Female, Album of the Year – Female and Best Album – Female. Mary J. Blige has won the most awards in this category, with a total of four.

== Winners and nominees ==
Winners are listed first and highlighted in bold.

=== 1980s ===
Year	Artist	Album	Ref
1987
1987	**Janet Jackson**	**Control**	
1987	Anita Baker	Rapture	
1987	Whitney Houston	Whitney Houston	
1987	Patti LaBelle	Winner in You	
1988
1988	**Whitney Houston**	**Whitney**	
1988	Natalie Cole	Everlasting	
1988	Jody Watley	Jody Watley	
1988	Angela Winbush	Sharp	
1989
1989	**Anita Baker**	**Giving You the Best That I Got**	
1989	Tracy Chapman	Tracy Chapman	
1989	Sade	Stronger Than Pride	
1989	Vanessa Williams	The Right Stuff	

=== 1990s ===
Year	Artist	Album	Ref
1990
1990	**Janet Jackson**	**Rhythm Nation 1814**	
1990	Regina Belle	Stay with Me	
1990	Stacy Lattisaw	What You Need	
1990	Stephanie Mills	Home	
1991
1991	**Mariah Carey**	**Mariah Carey**	
1991	Anita Baker	Compositions	
1991	Michel'le	Michel'le	
1991	Lisa Stansfield	Affection	
1992
1992	**Natalie Cole**	**Unforgettable... with Love**	
1992	Mariah Carey	Emotions	
1992	Lisa Fischer	So Intense	
1992	Whitney Houston	I'm Your Baby Tonight	
1993
1993	**Mary J. Blige**	**What's the 411**	
1993	Mariah Carey	MTV Unplugged	
1993	CeCe Peniston	Finally	
1993	Sade	Love Deluxe	
1994
1994	**Toni Braxton**	**Toni Braxton**	
1994	Mariah Carey	Music Box	
1994	Janet Jackson	janet.	
1994	Tina Turner	What's Love Got to Do with It	
1995
1995	**Anita Baker**	**Rhythm of Love**	
1995	Aaliyah	Age Ain't Nothing but a Number	
1995	Brandy	Brandy	
1995	Me'Shell Ndegeocello	Plantation Lullabies	
1996
1996	**Mary J. Blige**	**My Life**	
1996	Mariah Carey	Daydream	
1996	Faith Evans	Faith	
1996	Monica	Miss Thang	
1997
1997	**Toni Braxton**	**Secrets**	
1997	Aaliyah	One in a Million	
1997	Monifah	Moods...Moments	
1997	Me'Shell NdegeOcello	Peace Beyond Passion	
1998
1998	**Erykah Badu**	**Baduizm**	
1998	Mary J. Blige	Share My World	
1998	Janet Jackson	The Velvet Rope	
1998	Lil' Kim	Hard Core	
1999
1999	**Lauryn Hill**	**The Miseducation of Lauryn Hill**	
1999	Brandy	Never Say Never	
1999	Mýa	Mýa	
1999	Kelly Price	Soul of a Woman	

=== 2000s ===
Year	Artist	Album	Ref
2000
2000	**Mary J. Blige**	**Mary**	
2000	Macy Gray	On How Life Is	
2000	Whitney Houston	My Love Is Your Love	
2000	Jennifer Lopez	On the 6	
2001
2001	**Jill Scott**	**Who Is Jill Scott? Words and Sounds Vol. 1**	
2001	Toni Braxton	The Heat	
2001	Mýa	Fear of Flying	
2001	Kelly Price	Mirror Mirror	
2002
2002	**Alicia Keys**	**Songs in A Minor**	
2002	Aaliyah	Aaliyah	
2002	India.Arie	Acoustic Soul	
2002	Sade	Lovers Rock	
2003
2003	**Ashanti**	**Ashanti**	
2003	Amerie	All I Have	
2003	Mary J. Blige	No More Drama	
2003	Angie Stone	Mahogany Soul	
2004
2004	**Beyoncé**	**Dangerously in Love**	
2004	Erykah Badu	Worldwide Underground	
2004	Mary J. Blige	Love & Life	
2004	Aretha Franklin	So Damn Happy	
2005
2005	**Alicia Keys**	**The Diary of Alicia Keys**	
2005	Brandy	Afrodisiac	
2005	Ciara	Goodies	
2005	Jill Scott	Beautifully Human: Words and Sounds Vol. 2	
2006
2006	**Mariah Carey**	**The Emancipation of Mimi**	
2006	Keyshia Cole	The Way It Is	
2006	Faith Evans	The First Lady	
2006	Fantasia	Free Yourself	
2007
2007	**Mary J. Blige**	**The Breakthrough**	
2007	Beyoncé	B’Day	
2007	India.Arie	Testimony: Vol. 1, Life & Relationship	
2007	Monica	The Makings of Me	

== See also ==
- List of music awards honoring women
