= Baby Makin' Project =

Studio album by Jagged Edge
- Released: September 25, 2007
- Length: 38:08
- Labels: So So Def; Island
- Producers: Brandon Casey (exec.); Brian Casey (exec.); Jermaine Dupri (also exec.); Sick Cents; Tha Corna Boyz; Crackpot; Manuel Seal; Selasi

Jagged Edge chronology
The Hits (2006)	Baby Makin' Project (2007)	The Remedy (2011)

Singles from Baby Makin' Project
- 1. "Put a Little Umph in It" Released: July 24, 2007

Baby Makin' Project is the sixth studio album by American group Jagged Edge. It was released through So So Def Recordings and Island Records on September 25, 2007, in the United States. The album marked their debut with the label, following their departure from Columbia Records and the appointment of former longtime collaborator Jermaine Dupri as the president of Island Records. Apart from Dupri and co-producer Manuel Seal, Jagged Edge also worked with Selasi, Tha Corna Boyz and Crackpot on the album.

The album earned generally mixed to lukewarm reviews from music critics. Baby Makin' Project debuted at number eight on the US Billboard 200 and number three on the Top R&B/Hip-Hop Albums chart. It was the band's sixth consecutive album to reach the top ten on both charts but sold significantly less than their previous studio albums. The song "Put a Little Umph in It" featuring singer Ashanti served as the first single off the album and peaked at number 49 on Billboard' US Hot R&B/Hip-Hop Songs chart.

== Background ==
In 2001, Jagged Edge released their third studio album Jagged Little Thrill. Their third project to be issued under producer and mentor Jermaine Dupri's Columbia Records distributed imprint, So So Def Recordings, it debuted and peaked at number three on the US Billboard 200 and sold over 1.5 million copies domestically. In late 2002, So So Def's distribution deal with Columbia ended. The following year, Dupri moved So So Def to Arista Records. While many of So So Def's acts moved with the label to Arista, Jagged Edge along with rapper Bow Wow were forced to remain at Columbia since they were contractually bound to the company. Following the released of their eponymous fifth studio album through Columbia, the band moved to Island Def Jam in 2007 when Dupri became the president of Island Records.

== Critical reception ==
Professional ratings
Review scores
Source	Rating
About.com	3/5 stars
AllMusic	3.5/5 stars
DJBooth.net	3.5/5 stars
PopMatters	4/10
Rolling Stone	2/5 stars

Nathan Slavik from DJBooth.net called the album "your source for sexually soaked ballads" and "a lush collection of ballads whose effects can only be properly judged nine months from now." He concluded: "Listen, if you don't already own a Jagged Edge album it's hard to believe Baby Makin' Project will be your first, but long time fans won't be disappointed." AllMusic editor Andy Kellman found that "as a title, Baby Makin' Project doesn't really do much to indicate that there will be much of a difference between its content and that of Jagged Edge's past albums. There's a slightly higher percentage of ballads and midtempo songs, but for the most part, this is exactly what one should expect from the group by now – not a masterpiece, but another strong addition to the catalog."

The New York Times wrote: "This R&B man band has been cranking out single-minded hits (good ones, usually) for a decade. Baby Makin' Project should underscore the members' admirable refusal to be distracted from the main objective." Christian Hoard from Rolling Stone magazine rated the album two out of five stars. He felt that Baby Makin' Project was "full of lush, strenuously sung R&B – the sort of thing that brings to mind candles, oiled pecs and dripping sweat. The beats are cushy, but there's too much oversinging (Beyoncé's vocals are restrained in comparison), and memorable cuts are scarce. In the end, let's-get-it-on slow jams like "Put a Little Umph in It" are probably of limited use to anyone who's already set with fuck soundtracks, or anyone who demands more kinetic motion in their R&B." PopMatters critic Mike Joseph noted that "while there's a lot to be said about not compromising or following trends, you've gotta think that after making the same record six times in a row, a lot of folks have to have stopped listening. And after this album, you can probably place me onto that pile as well."

== Commercial performance ==
Following its release, Baby Makin' Project debuted at number eight on the US Billboard 200 and number three on the Top R&B/Hip-Hop Albums chart, selling about 78,000 copies in its first week. It was the band's fifth consecutive album to reach the top ten on both charts. By May 2009, the album had sold 246,000 copies in the United States, according to Nielsen SoundScan.

== Track listing ==
Baby Makin' Project track listing
No.	Title	Writer(s)	Producer(s)	Length
1.	"Intro"			1:10
2.	"Put a Little Umph in It" (featuring Ashanti)	Brandon Casey; Brian Casey; Jermaine Dupri; Johnta Austin; Manuel Seal	Dupri; Seal^{[a]}	3:31
3.	"Whole Town Laughing"	Brandon Casey; Brian Casey	Sick Cents	3:48
4.	"Me That's Who"	Brandon Casey; Brian Casey; Stevie Jordan	Sick Cents	3:36
5.	"Get This"	Brandon Casey; Brian Casey; Dupri; Seal	Dupri; Seal^{[a]}	5:34
6.	"I'll Be Damned"	Brandon Casey; Brian Casey; Dupri; Seal	Dupri; Seal^{[a]}	5:17
7.	"Can't Get Right"	Brandon Casey; Chris Spruell; Dwayne Nesmith; Pierre Medor; Selasi Duse	Sick Cents; Selasi^{[a]}; CrakPot^{[a]}; Tha Corna Boyz^{[a]}	3:46
8.	"Way to Say I Love You"	Brandon Casey; Brian Casey; Dupri; Seal	Dupri; Seal^{[a]}	2:56
9.	"Sunrise"	Brandon Casey; Brian Casey	Sick Cents	3:47
10.	"Round And Round"	Brandon Casey; Brian Casey; Spruell; Nesmith	Sick Cents; CrakPot^{[a]}	5:26
11.	"Turn U On"	Brandon Casey; Brian Casey; Duse	Selasi	3:51
Total length:				38:08

Notes

- ^{^[a]} signifies co-producer

== Charts ==
=== Weekly charts ===
Weekly chart performance for Baby Makin' Project
Chart (2007)	Peak position
US Billboard 200	8
US Top R&B/Hip-Hop Albums (Billboard)	3

=== Year-end charts ===
Year-end chart performance for Baby Makin' Project
Chart (2007)	Position
US Top R&B/Hip-Hop Albums (Billboard)	66
