= The Remedy (Jagged Edge album) =

Studio album by Jagged Edge
- Released: June 21, 2011
- Length: 44:01
- Labels: 581; Slip-N-Slide
- Producers: Paul Anderson; Bigg D; Brandon Casey; Brian Casey; Casey Boyz; Cool & Dre; Jim Jonsin; Cainon Lamb; Adam Ledgister; Brass Knuckles; Gorilla Tek; Mad Skrews

Jagged Edge chronology
Baby Makin' Project (2007)	The Remedy (2011)	J.E. Heartbreak 2 (2014)

Singles from The Remedy
- 1. "Lay You Down" Released: July 6, 2010; 2. "My Girl" Released: November 16, 2010; 3. "Baby" Released: March 1, 2011; 4. "Flow Through My Veins" Released: June 9, 2011; 5. "Love On You" Released: September 21, 2011

The Remedy is the seventh studio album by American R&B group Jagged Edge. It was released on June 21, 2011, through Slip-N-Slide Records and their own label 581 Music. Their first album with both labels, following their departure from So So Def and Island Records, the project boasts a mix of the old and new; Jagged Edge's sexy R&B sound and contemporary beats by producers such as Cool & Dre, Cainon Lamb, Bigg D, and Jim Jonsin, as well as band members Brandon and Brian Casey.

The album earned largely positive reviews from music critics. It debuted and peaked at number 35 on the US Billboard 200 with 12,400 copies sold in the first week, becoming the band's lowest-charting album since their debut A Jagged Era (1997). It also reached number seven on the Top R&B/Hip-Hop Albums chart. The Remedy produced several singles, including lead single "Lay You Down," none of which managed to link to the commercial success of previous singles.

== Background ==
In 2007, Jagged Edge released their sixth studio album Baby Makin' Project. While it marked their debut with Island Def Jam, it also saw the band reteaming with Island Records president and former mentor Jermaine Dupri and his So So Def imprint under which Jagged Edge had released their first five album via Columbia Records. Though Baby Makin' Project became the band's fifth consecutive album to reach the top ten of the US Billboard 200, increasing tensions between Durpri and Def Jam head L.A. Reid led the band to feel that their stint with Island had become ill-suited. While Jagged Edge initially intended to disband and proceed with individual projects, Slip-N-Slide Records CEO Ted Lucas eventually offered them a new recording deal through their own label 581 Records. Jagged Edge subsequently requested a release from Island Def Jam, which Dupri quickly approved.

== Recording ==
As with their previous album, band members Brandon and Brian Casey became instrumental in producing the majority of the Jagged Edge's material for The Remedy. Apart from their songs, the group worked a variety of producers on the album, including Cool & Dre, Cainon Lamb, Bigg D, and Jim Jonsin, among others. Group member Kyle Norman described The Remedy as an attempt at "a new creation, a new birth" and further added: "We want to bring a little light to what we’ve been doing for the past 11-12 years." The group also hoped to work with Rick Ross, Plies, Jay-Z, Snoop Dogg, as well as newcomers Jarvis and Chelsea, both of whom had been signed to the group's 581 Music. Ross, however, became the only one to make a feature on the album.

== Promotion ==
"Lay You Down" was released as the album's first single on July 6, 2010. The song peaked at number 89 on Billboard's US Hot R&B/Hip-Hop Songs chart, becoming the group's lowest-charting lead single by then. "Baby" served as the second single from The Remedy and was released on March 1, 2011. "Flow Through My Veins," the album's third official single, was released on June 9, 2011. while fourth and final single, "Love On You," was issued on September 21, 2011.

== Critical reception ==
Professional ratings
Review scores
Source	Rating
About.com	3.5/5 stars
AllMusic	3/5 stars
Soul in Stereo	3.5/5 stars

AllMusic editor Andy Kellman found that "a few years of inactivity and that false start notwithstanding, The Remedy easily falls into place as yet another decent, occasionally great Jagged Edge album that further refines their brand of sophisticated salaciousness. Once again, the Casey twins composed the majority of the material, [...] but nothing is out of character. And, as usual, the standouts typically involve the Caseys pleading admiration or devotion in a way that is neither too cool nor oversold." Edward Bowser from Soul in Stereo felt that The Remedy "is certainly not as schizophrenic as Jagged Edge's last albums, but its major drawback is that it's a bit too cohesive. Thanks to similar production and themes, about half of the tracks blend into each other [...] Jagged Edge's new set doesn’t quite measure up to their greatest work, but it’s a success nonetheless. The group has finally rediscovered its identity, making The Remedy the cure for the common R&B album."

== Commercial performance ==
Originally intended to be released in 2010, The Remedy was eventually issued on June 21, 2011. It debuted and peaked at number 35 on the US Billboard 200 and number seven on the Top R&B/Hip-Hop Albums chart, with first week sales of 12,400 copies. It was Jagged Edge's first album not to reach the top ten of the US Billboard 200 since their debut album A Jagged Era, released in 1997.

== Track listing ==
The Remedy track listing
No.	Title	Writer(s)	Producer(s)	Length
1.	"Intro"	Brandon Casey; Brian Casey; Adam Ledgister	Brandon Casey; Brian Casey; Ledgister	2:00
2.	"Love On You"	Brandon Casey; Brian Casey	Brandon Casey; Brian Casey	4:28
3.	"Baby" (featuring Fabolous)	Cainon Lamb; John Jackson; Taurian Osborn	Lamb	3:52
4.	"Flow Through My Veins"	Brandon Casey; Brian Casey; Frank Romano; James Scheffer	Jim Jonsin	3:26
5.	"My Girl"	Brandon Casey; Brian Casey; Danny D'Brito; Anthony Livadas; Derrick Baker	Bigg D; Brass Knuckles	3:34
6.	"I Need a Woman"	Brandon Casey; Brian Casey; Lamb	Lamb	3:43
7.	"Lipstick" (featuring Rick Ross)	Brandon Casey; Brian Casey; William Roberts II; D'Brito; Livadas; Baker	Bigg D; Brass Knuckles	3:07
8.	"Space Ship"	Brandon Casey; Brian Casey	Brandon Casey; Brian Casey; Ledgister; Paul Anderson	4:21
9.	"Lay You Down"	Brandon Casey; Brian Casey; Marcello Valenzano; Andre Lyon; Eddie Montilla	Cool & Dre	3:38
10.	"Let's Make Love"	Brandon Casey; Brian Casey	Brandon Casey; Brian Casey; Anderson	3:56
11.	"When the Bed Shakes"	Brandon Casey; Brian Casey; Tony Castillo	Gorilla Tek	4:13
12.	"Mr. Wrong"	Brandon Casey; Brian Casey; Ledgister	Brandon Casey; Brian Casey; Ledgister	3:43
Total length:				44:01

iTunes edition – bonus track
No.	Title	Writer(s)	Producer(s)	Length
13.	"Never Meant to Lead You On"	Brandon Casey; Brian Casey	Drumma Boy	4:02

== Charts ==
Weekly chart performance for The Remedy
Chart (2011)	Peak position
US Billboard 200	35
US Top R&B/Hip-Hop Albums (Billboard)	7
