= Hard (Jagged Edge album) =

Studio album by Jagged Edge
- Released: October 14, 2003
- Length: 64:14
- Label: Columbia
- Producer: Melvin Coleman; Tha Cornaboyz; Bryan-Michael Cox; Jermaine Dupri; Kevin Hicks; Jazze Pha; Sick Cents Productions

Jagged Edge chronology
Jagged Little Thrill (2001)	Hard (2003)	Jagged Edge (2006)

Singles from Hard
- 1. "Walked Outta Heaven" Released: September 20, 2003; 2. "What's It Like" Released: March 2004

Hard is the fourth studio album by American R&B group Jagged Edge. It was released by Columbia Records on October 14, 2003 in the United States. The album was the band's first project not released under mentor Jermaine Dupri's So So Def label, after its deal expired at the end of 2002 and the band became contractually bound to Columbia Records. Dupri became less prominent on Jagged Edge's new material as a result, with Melvin Coleman taking over much of the production duties on Hard.

The album earned largely mixed to negative reviews from music critics, some of whom called it repetitious and bland. Upon its release, Hard debuted at number three on the US Billboard 200 with first-week sales of 178,000 copies and sold more than 870,000 copies domestically. It was eventually certified Gold by the Recording Industry Association of America (RIAA) and reached Silver status in the United Kingdom. The album spawned two singles, including the top ten single "Walked Outta Heaven."

== Promotion ==
Hard was preceded by lead single "Walked Outta Heaven." The song was released on August 19, 2003 and debuted at number 41 on Billboard's US Hot R&B/Hip-Hop Singles & Tracks chart. It eventually peaked at number six on the US Billboard Hot 100, becoming the band's highest-charting single since "Where the Party At." Follow-up and final single "What's It Like" was released in 2004 and peaked at number eighty-five on the US Billboard Hot 100, as well as number 32 on the US Hot R&B/Hip-Hop Singles & Tracks chart.

== Critical reception ==
Professional ratings
Review scores
Source	Rating
AllMusic	2.5/5 stars
Rolling Stone	2/5 stars

AllMusic editor William Ruhlmann called the album a collection "full of slow-tempo love songs anchored by synthetic bass beats that will test the capacity of woofers and filled with involved group vocal choruses set against pleading solo lead lines that weave in and out [...] The music is repetitious, the lyrical sentiments bland, but in an act like this, image is just as important as the music (at least in commercial terms)." Rolling Stone critic Jon Caramanica wrote: "For the first half of Hard, the members of this Atlanta quartet clumsily attempt to outcroon one another, and the latter half features nothing as lurid as 2000's "Promise" or as kinetic as 2001's "Where the Party At." Still, Hard is worthy, modern-day thug soul."

== Commercial performance ==
Hard debuted and peaked at number three on the US Billboard 200 and number two on the Top R&B/Hip-Hop Albums chart, with first-week sales of 178,000 copies. On November 18, 2003, it was certified Gold by the Recording Industry Association of America (RIAA). By November 2005, the album had sold 871,000 copies domestcially, according to Nielsen SoundScan.

== Track listing ==
Hard track listing
No.	Title	Writer(s)	Producer(s)	Length
1.	"They Ain't J.E."	Brandon Casey; Brian Casey; Phalon Alexander	Jazze Pha	3:38
2.	"Walked Outta Heaven"	Brandon Casey; Brian Casey; Bryan-Michael Cox	Cox	4:30
3.	"Girls Gone Wild" (featuring Major Damage)	Brandon Casey; Brian Casey; Dwayne Nesmith; Hockefa Lamar; Pierre Medor	Sick Cents Productions; Tha Cornaboyz	4:24
4.	"Visions"	Brandon Casey; Brian Casey; Dupri; Cox; Michael Henderson	Dupri; Cox	4:16
5.	"Hard"	Brandon Casey; Brian Casey	Sick Cents Productions; Melvin Coleman	4:21
6.	"Dance Floor"	Brandon Casey; Brian Casey; Coleman	Coleman	3:16
7.	"Trying to Find the Words"	Brandon Casey; Brian Casey; Coleman	Coleman	4:02
8.	"What's It Like"	Brandon Casey; Brian Casey; Coleman	Coleman	4:13
9.	"Tryna Be Your Man"	Brandon Casey; Brian Casey; Cox	Cox	3:18
10.	"I Don't Wanna"	Brandon Casey; Brian Casey; Cox; Kevin Hicks	Cox; Hicks	4:59
11.	"In Private"	Brandon Casey; Brian Casey; Coleman	Coleman	3:52
12.	"In the Morning"	Brandon Casey; Brian Casey; Coleman	Coleman	5:30
13.	"Shady Girl"	Brandon Casey; Brian Casey; Anthony Criss; Cox; Dupri; Keir Gist; Vincent Brown	Dupri; Cox	3:20

Bonus tracks
No.	Title	Writer(s)	Producer(s)	Length
14.	"Car Show" (featuring Big Boi)	Brandon Casey; Brian Casey; Antwan Patton	Sick Cents Productions	4:41
15.	"They Ain't Je (Remix)" (featuring Street Katz & Woonie)	Brandon Casey; Brian Casey; Alexander; Lee Dixon; Rahj Rowe; Tatu Hill	Sick Cents Productions	5:39
Total length:				64:14

International bonus track
No.	Title	Writer(s)	Producer(s)	Length
16.	"On My Way (After the Club)"	Brandon Casey; Brian Casey; Alexander	Pha	4:34

Japanese bonus track
No.	Title	Writer(s)	Producer(s)	Length
16.	"Respect My Girl"	Brandon Casey; Brian Casey; Dwayne Nesmith; Pierre Medor	Sick Cents Productions; Tha Cornaboyz	4:17

Samples

- "Visions" contains samples from the composition "You Are My Starship" written by Michael Henderson.
- "Shady Girl" contains samples from the composition "Uptown Anthem" by Naughty by Nature.

== Charts ==
=== Weekly charts ===
Weekly chart performance for Hard
Chart (2003)	Peak position
UK Albums (OCC)	82
UK R&B Albums (OCC)	13
US Billboard 200	3
US Top R&B/Hip-Hop Albums (Billboard)	1

=== Year-end charts ===
2003 year-end chart performance for Hard
Chart (2003)	Position
US Billboard 200	175
US Top R&B/Hip-Hop Albums (Billboard)	67

2004 year-end chart performance for Hard
Chart (2004)	Position
US Billboard 200	183
US Top R&B/Hip-Hop Albums (Billboard)	53

== Certifications ==
Certifications for Hard
Region	Certification	Certified units/sales
United Kingdom (BPI)	Gold	100,000^{‡}
United States (RIAA)	Gold	500,000^{^}
^{^} Shipments figures based on certification alone.
