= Tip of My Tongue =

Tip of My Tongue may refer to:

- "Tip of My Tongue" (Tommy Quickly song) (1963)
- "Tip of My Tongue" (Diesel song) (1992)
- "Tip of My Tongue" (Lynsey de Paul song) (1973)
- "Tip of My Tongue" (Kenny Chesney song) (2019)
- "Tip of My Tongue", a song by Jagged Edge (2009)
- "Tip of My Tongue", a song by Kelly Clarkson included on her album All I Ever Wanted (2009)
- "Tip of My Tongue", a song by The Tubes included on their album Outside Inside (1983)
- Tip of My Tongue, a 2000 short movie with Ben Miller

== See also ==
- Tip of the tongue
- Anterior tongue
- "Tippa My Tongue", a song by the Red Hot Chili Peppers
- "Right on the Tip of My Tongue", a 1971 single by Brenda & the Tabulations
