= 2001 Soul Train Music Awards =

Music awards ceremony in Los Angeles, US

Soul Train Music Awards
- Date: February 28, 2001
- Location: Shrine Auditorium, Los Angeles, California
- Country: United States
- Hosted by: Queen Latifah, Mýa and Shemar Moore
- First award: 1987

Highlights
- Most awards: R. Kelly and Jagged Edge (2)
- Website: soultrain.com

Television/radio coverage
- Network: WGN America

The 2001 Soul Train Music Awards were held on February 28, 2001, at the Shrine Auditorium in Los Angeles, California. The show was hosted by Queen Latifah, Mýa, and Shemar Moore.

== Special awards ==
=== Quincy Jones Award for Career Achievement ===
- The Isley Brothers

=== Sammy Davis Jr. Award for "Entertainer of the Year" – Male ===
- Jay Z

=== Sammy Davis Jr. Award for "Entertainer of the Year" – Female ===
- Destiny's Child

== Winners and nominees ==
Winners are in bold text.

=== R&B/Soul or Rap Album of the Year ===
- **Dr. Dre – Dr. Dre 2001**
  - Eminem – The Marshall Mathers LP
  - Jay Z – The Dynasty: Roc La Familia
  - R. Kelly – TP-2.com

=== Best R&B/Soul Album – Male ===
- **R. Kelly – TP-2.com**
  - D'Angelo – Voodoo
  - Sisqó – Unleash the Dragon
  - Carl Thomas – Emotional

=== Best R&B/Soul Album – Female ===
- **Jill Scott – Who Is Jill Scott? Words and Sounds Vol. 1**
  - Toni Braxton – The Heat
  - Mýa – Fear of Flying
  - Kelly Price – Mirror Mirror

=== Best R&B/Soul Album – Group, Band or Duo ===
- **Jagged Edge – J.E. Heartbreak**
  - Mary Mary – Thankful
  - Next – Welcome II Nextasy
  - Lucy Pearl – Lucy Pearl

=== Best R&B/Soul Single – Male ===
- **R. Kelly – "I Wish"**
  - Avant – "Separated"
  - D'Angelo – "Untitled (How Does It Feel)"
  - Carl Thomas – "I Wish"

=== Best R&B/Soul Single – Female ===
- **Tamia – "Stranger In My House"**
  - Yolanda Adams – "Open My Heart"
  - Erykah Badu - "Bag Lady"
  - Jill Scott – "Gettin' In the Way"

=== Best R&B/Soul Single – Group, Band or Duo ===
- **Jagged Edge – "Let's Get Married"**
  - Destiny's Child – "Independent Women, Part I"
  - Whitney Houston and Deborah Cox – "Same Script, Different Cast"
  - Lucy Pearl – "Dance Tonight"

=== The Michael Jackson Award for Best R&B/Soul or Rap Music Video ===
- **Mystikal – "Shake Ya Ass"**
  - Wyclef Jean (featuring Mary J. Blige) – "911"
  - Eminem – "Stan"
  - OutKast – "Ms. Jackson"

=== Best R&B/Soul or Rap New Artist ===
- **Nelly**
  - Lil' Bow Wow
  - Jill Scott
  - Carl Thomas

=== Best Gospel Album ===
- **Mary Mary – Thankful**
  - Chester D.T. Baldwin and Music Ministry Mass – Sing It on Sunday Morning!
  - Mississippi Mass Choir – Emmanuel (God With Us)
  - Lee Williams and the Spiritual QC's – Good Time

== Performers ==
- Destiny's Child – "Survivor"
- Jagged Edge – Medley: "Promise" / "Let's Get Married"
- Yolanda Adams and Gerald Levert – "I Believe I Can Fly"
- Jay Z and The Dogg Pound – Medley: "I Just Wanna Love U (Give It 2 Me)" / "Change The Game (Remix)"
- Mýa – "Case of the Ex" / "Free"
- Mystikal featuring Nivea – "Danger (Been So Long)"
- The Isley Brothers Tribute:
  - Kelly Price – "Groove With You"
  - Sisqo – "Between the Sheets"
  - Gerald Levert – Medley: "Voyage to Atlantis" / "Tears"
- Nelly – "E.I."
- Jill Scott – "A Long Walk"
- Carl Thomas – Medley: "I Wish" / "Emotional"

== Presenters ==
- Bill Bellamy, Leeza Gibbons and Erykah Badu - Presented Best R&B/Soul or Rap New Artist
- Damon Dash and Russell Simmons - Presented Sammy Davis Jr. Award for Entertainer of the Year – Male
- Shaggy, Vivica A. Fox and K-Ci & JoJo - Presented Best R&B/Soul Single - Group, Band or Duo
- Wyclef Jean - Presented Sammy Davis Jr. Award for Entertainer of the Year – Female
- Tyrese, Tamia and Lucy Pearl - Presented Best R&B/Soul Single - Male
- Shaun Robinson, Red Hot Chili Peppers and Avant - Presented The Michael Jackson Award for Best R&B/Soul or Rap Music Video
- The Transitions, Ja Rule and Sheryl Swoopes - Presented Best Gospel Album
- Luther Vandross - Presented Quincy Jones Award for Career Achievement
- Musiq Soulchild, Deborah Cox and 112 - Presented R&B/Soul or Rap Album of the Year
- Jaheim, Tracee Ellis Ross and Jon B. - Presented Best R&B/Soul Single - Female
- Xzibit, Keith Sweat and Dark Blu - Presented Best R&B/Soul Album - Group, Band or Duo
- Magic Johnson, Joe and Next - Presented Best R&B/Soul Album - Male
- Mary Mary, Lil’ Bow Wow and Busta Rhymes - Presented Best R&B/Soul Album - Female
