= Put a Little Umph in It =

Single by Jagged Edge featuring Ashanti

from the album Baby Makin' Project
- Released: July 24, 2007 (iTunes)
- Recorded: 2007
- Studio: Southside Studios (Atlanta, GA); Tiki Recording (Glen Cove, NY)
- Genre: R&B
- Length: 4:02
- Label: Island Urban/So So Def
- Songwriter(s): Johntá Austin, Brian Casey, Brandon Casey, Jermaine Dupri, Manuel Seal, Steve Standard
- Producer(s): Jermaine Dupri, Manuel Seal

Jagged Edge singles chronology
| "Stunnas" (2006) | "Put a Little Umph in It" (2007) | "Tip of My Tongue" (2010) |

Ashanti singles chronology
| "Pac's Life" (2007) | "Put a Little Umph in It" (2007) | "The Way That I Love You" (2008) |

"Put a Little Umph in It" is the first single from Jagged Edge's studio album Baby Makin' Project. It features pop–R&B singer Ashanti. The song was their first single since being dropped from Columbia Records and getting signed to Island Def Jam.

== Music video ==
The music video was shot by Norwegian director Ray Kay around the week of July 17, 2007. Jagged Edge members looked for female video dancers with acting ability (a big plus for the Soprano's-style narrative). The video premiered on 106 & Park as the New Joint of the Day on August 15, 2007. Ashanti's verse was taken out of the song, and replaced with a clip from "Whole Town Laughing."

On HOT 97 in New York City, shortly after the video was released, Jagged Edge reportedly said Ashanti was not featured in the music video due to a conflict disagreement with Irv Gotti.

== Remix ==
There is a So So Def Remix of the track on the Japanese version of the album Baby Makin' Project.

== Charts ==
| Chart (2007) | Peak position |
|---|---|
| US Bubbling Under Hot 100 Singles (Billboard) | 13 |
| US Hot R&B/Hip-Hop Songs (Billboard) | 49 |
