= 2007 Soul Train Music Awards =

Music awards ceremony in Pasadena, US

Soul Train Music Awards
- Date: March 10, 2007
- Location: Pasadena Civic Auditorium, Pasadena, California
- Country: United States
- Hosted by: LeToya Luckett and Omarion
- First award: 1987
- Website: soultrain.com

Television/radio coverage
- Network: BET

The 2007 Soul Train Music Awards were held on March 10, 2007 at the Pasadena Civic Auditorium in Pasadena, California and it was hosted by LeToya Luckett and Omarion. The awards ceremony was televised on March 17 and 24 on cable TV.

The ceremony included a performance by Jennifer Hudson, Hudson also received the Entertainer of the Year award. Other performers included, were Robin Thicke, LeToya Luckett, Rick Ross and Ronald Isley, also a special tribute to the God Father of Soul, James Brown.

== Special awards ==
=== Quincy Jones Award for Outstanding Career Achievements ===
- Jermaine Dupri

=== Stevie Wonder Award for Outstanding Achievement in Songwriting ===
- Babyface

=== Sammy Davis, Jr. Award for "Entertainer of the Year" ===
- Jennifer Hudson

== Winners and nominees ==
Winners are in bold text.

=== Best R&B/Soul Album – Male ===
- **Jamie Foxx – Unpredictable**
  - Ne-Yo – In My Own Words
  - John Legend – Once Again
  - Robin Thicke – The Evolution of Robin Thicke

=== Best R&B/Soul Album – Female ===
- **Mary J. Blige – The Breakthrough**
  - Beyoncé – B'Day
  - India.Arie – Testimony: Vol. 1, Life & Relationship
  - Monica – The Makings of Me

=== Best R&B/Soul Album – Group, Band or Duo ===
- **The Isley Brothers Featuring Ronald Isley – Baby Makin' Music**
  - Gnarls Barkley – St. Elsewhere
  - Danity Kane – Danity Kane
  - Jagged Edge – Jagged Edge

=== Best R&B/Soul Single – Male ===
- **John Legend – "Save Room"**
  - Avant – "4 Minutes"
  - Chris Brown – "Yo (Excuse Me Miss)"
  - Ne-Yo – "Sexy Love"

=== Best R&B/Soul Single – Female ===
- **Beyoncé – "Irreplaceable"**
  - Mary J. Blige – "Take Me As I Am"
  - Keyshia Cole – "Love"
  - LeToya – "Torn"

=== Best R&B/Soul Single – Group, Band or Duo ===
- **Gnarls Barkley – "Crazy"**
  - The Isley Brothers Featuring Ronald Isley – "Just Came Here to Chill"
  - Jagged Edge – "Good Luck Charm"
  - The Pussycat Dolls (featuring Avant) – "Stickwitu"

=== The Michael Jackson Award for Best R&B/Soul or Rap Music Video ===
- **Jay Z – "Show Me What You Got"**
  - Beyoncé – "Irreplaceable"
  - Busta Rhymes (featuring will.i.am and Kelis) – "I Love My Chick"
  - Jim Jones – "We Fly High"

=== The Coca-Cola Classic Award for Best R&B/Soul or Rap New Artist ===
- **Ne-Yo**
  - Lupe Fiasco
  - Rick Ross
  - Yung Joc

=== The Sprite Award for Best R&B/Soul or Rap Dance Cut ===
- **DJ Webstar and Young B. (featuring The Voice of Harlem) – "Chicken Noodle Soup"**
  - Dem Franchize Boyz (featuring Lil Peanut and Charlay) – "Lean wit It, Rock wit It"
  - Sean Paul – "Give It Up to Me"
  - Yung Joc – "It's Goin' Down"

=== Best Gospel Album ===
- **Kirk Franklin – Songs from the Storm, Volume I**
  - The Caravans – Paved the Way
  - Bishop G.E. Patterson & Congregation – Singing the Old Time Way, Volume II
  - Youth for Christ – The Struggle is Over

== Performers ==
- Jennifer Hudson
- Omarion
- Robin Thicke
- Letoya Luckett
- Rick Ross
- Ronald Isley
- DJ Webstar and Young B.
