= 2002 Soul Train Music Awards =

Music awards ceremony in Los Angeles, US

Soul Train Music Awards
- Date: March 30, 2002
- Location: Los Angeles Memorial Sport Arena, Los Angeles, California
- Country: United States
- Hosted by: Shemar Moore, Arsenio Hall, Yolanda Adams and Faith Evans
- First award: 1987

Highlights
- Most awards: Alicia Keys (3)
- Website: soultrain.com

Television/radio coverage
- Network: WGN America

The 2002 Soul Train Music Awards were held on 30 March 2002 at the Los Angeles Memorial Sport Arena in Los Angeles, California. The show was hosted by Arsenio Hall, Yolanda Adams, Faith Evans and Shemar Moore.

== Special awards ==
=== Quincy Jones Award for Outstanding Career Achievements ===
- The O'Jays

=== Sammy Davis Jr. Award for "Entertainer of the Year" – Male ===
- Dr. Dre

=== Sammy Davis Jr. Award for "Entertainer of the Year" – Female ===
- Alicia Keys

== Winners and nominees ==
Winners are in bold text.

=== R&B/Soul or Rap Album of the Year ===
- **Jay Z – The Blueprint**
  - Aaliyah – Aaliyah
  - Ja Rule – Pain Is Love
  - Alicia Keys – Songs in A Minor

=== Best R&B/Soul Album – Male ===
- **Usher – 8701**
  - Jaheim - Ghetto Love
  - Michael Jackson – Invincible
  - Musiq Soulchild – Aijuswanaseing

=== Best R&B/Soul Album – Female ===
- **Alicia Keys – Songs in A Minor**
  - Aaliyah – Aaliyah
  - India.Arie – Acoustic Soul
  - Sade – Lovers Rock

=== Best R&B/Soul Album – Group Band, or Duo ===
- **The Isley Brothers Featuring Ronald Isley – Eternal**
  - 112 – Part III
  - Destiny's Child – Survivor
  - Jagged Edge – Jagged Little Thrill

=== Best R&B/Soul Single – Male ===
- **Musiq Soulchild – "Love"**
  - Jaheim – "Just in Case"
  - Brian McKnight – "Love of My Life"
  - Usher – "U Got It Bad"

=== Best R&B/Soul Single – Female ===
- **Aaliyah – "Rock the Boat"**
  - India.Arie – "Video"
  - Alicia Keys – "Fallin''"
  - Angie Stone – "Brotha"

=== Best R&B/Soul Single – Group, Band or Duo ===
- **The Isley Brothers Featuring Ronald Isley – "Contagious"**
  - Destiny's Child – "Survivor"
  - Jagged Edge with Nelly – "Where the Party At"
  - *NSYNC – "Gone"

=== Michael Jackson Award for Best R&B/Soul or Rap Music Video ===
- **Missy "Misdemeanor" Elliott – "Get Ur Freak On"**
  - The Isley Brothers Featuring Ronald Isley – "Contagious"
  - Jay Z – " Girls, Girls, Girls"
  - Busta Rhymes – "Break Ya Neck"

=== Best R&B/Soul or Rap New Artist ===
- **Alicia Keys – "Fallin'"**
  - Fabolous – "Young'n (Holla Back)"
  - India.Arie – "Video"
  - Bubba Sparxxx – "Ugly"

=== Best Gospel album ===
- **Donnie McClurkin – Live in London**
  - Yolanda Adams – The Experience
  - Kim Burrell – Live in Concert
  - Doug and Melvin Williams – Duets

== Performers ==
- Alicia Keys – "Girlfriend"
- Freeway featuring Jay Z and Beanie Sigel – "What We Do"
- Jagged Edge featuring Nelly – "Where the Party At"
- Usher – "U Don't Have to Call"
- Ja Rule and Ashanti – "Always on Time"
- Yolanda Adams – "I'm Gonna Be Ready"
- Busta Rhymes featuring P. Diddy and Pharrell Williams – "Pass the Courvoisier, Part II"
- The O'Jays Tribute:
  - LSG and Sean Levert – "Give the People What They Want" / "Cry Together" / "For the Love of Money" / "Let Me Make Love to You"
- Tweet and Missy Elliott – "Oops (Oh My)"
- Faith Evans – "I Love You"

== Presenters ==
- Shane Mosley, Lil’ Bow Wow and Shauntay Hinton - Presented Best R&B/Soul or Rap New Artist
- Magic Johnson - Presented Sammy Davis Jr. Award for Entertainer of the Year – Male
- Eddie Griffin, Joi and Shaun Robinson - Presented Best R&B/Soul Single - Group, Band or Duo
- Angela Bassett - Presented Sammy Davis Jr. Award for Entertainer of the Year – Female
- Kimberly Elise, Don Cheadle and Musiq Soulchild - Presented The Michael Jackson Award for Best R&B/Soul or Rap Music Video
- Shakara Ledard, Fabolous and Gary Dourdan - Presented Best R&B/Soul Single - Male
- Michelle Williams, Tank and Savion Glover - Presented Best Gospel Album
- Kelly Price, Garcelle Beauvais and Henry Simmons - Presented R&B/Soul or Rap Album of the Year
- Steve Harvey - Presented Quincy Jones Award for Career Achievement
- Aries Spears, KeKe Wyatt and Jaheim - Presented Best R&B/Soul Single - Female
- Jermaine Dupri, 3LW and Bubba Sparxxx - Presented Best R&B/Soul Album - Group, Band or Duo
- Donnie McClurkin, Sharissa and Glenn Lewis - Presented Best R&B/Soul Album - Male
- Carl Thomas, Tracee Ellis Ross and Golden Brooks - Presented Best R&B/Soul Album - Female
