= 2004 Soul Train Music Awards =

Music awards ceremony in Los Angeles, US

Soul Train Music Awards
- Date: March 20, 2004
- Location: International Cultural Center Auditorium, Los Angeles, California
- Country: United States
- Hosted by: Alicia Keys and Babyface
- First award: 1987

Highlights
- Most awards: OutKast (3)
- Website: soultrain.com

Television/radio coverage
- Network: BET

The 2004 Soul Train Music Awards were held on March 20, 2004 at the International Cultural Center Auditorium in Los Angeles, California. The show was hosted by Alicia Keys and Babyface.

== Special awards ==
=== Quincy Jones Award for Outstanding Career Achievements – Male ===
- R. Kelly

=== Quincy Jones Award for Outstanding Career Achievements – Female ===
- Janet Jackson

=== Sammy Davis, Jr. Award for "Entertainer of the Year" – Male ===
- OutKast

=== Sammy Davis, Jr. Award for "Entertainer of the Year" – Female ===
- Beyoncé

== Winners and nominees ==
Winners are in bold text.

=== Album of the Year ===
- **OutKast – Speakerboxxx/The Love Below**
  - Beyoncé – Dangerously in Love
  - R. Kelly – Chocolate Factory
  - Jay-Z – The Black Album

=== Best R&B/Soul Album – Male ===
- **R. Kelly – Chocolate Factory**
  - Dwele – Subject
  - Anthony Hamilton – Comin' From Where I'm From
  - Marques Houston – MH

=== Best R&B/Soul Album – Female ===
- **Beyoncé – Dangerously in Love**
  - Erykah Badu – Worldwide Underground
  - Mary J. Blige – Love & Life
  - Aretha Franklin – So Damn Happy

=== Best R&B/Soul Album – Duo or Group ===
- **B2K – Pandemonium!**
  - The Isley Brothers Featuring Ronald Isley – Body Kiss
  - Kindred the Family Soul – Surrender to Love
  - The Neptunes – Neptunes Presents Clones

=== Best R&B/Soul Single – Male ===
- **Anthony Hamilton – "Comin' From Where I'm From""**
  - Marques Houston - "That Girl"
  - Jaheim – "Put That Woman First"
  - Pharrell (featuring Jay Z) – "Frontin'"

=== Best R&B/Soul Single – Female ===
- **Alicia Keys – "You Don't Know My Name"**
  - Ashanti – "Rain on Me"
  - Erykah Badu – "Danger"
  - Beyoncé (featuring Jay Z) – "Crazy in Love"

=== Best R&B/Soul Single – Group, Band, or Duo ===
- **Floetry – "Say Yes"**
  - B2K – "Girlfriend"
  - The Isley Brothers Featuring Ronald Isley and JS – "Busted"
  - Jagged Edge – "Walked Outta Heaven"

=== The Michael Jackson Award for Best R&B/Soul or Rap Music Video ===
- **OutKast – "Hey Ya!"**
  - Beyoncé (featuring Jay Z) – "Crazy in Love"
  - Missy Elliott (featuring Ludacris) – "Gossip Folks"
  - Lil' Jon & The Eastside Boyz (featuring Ying Yang Twins) – "Get Low"

=== Best R&B/Soul or Rap New Artist ===
- **Chingy**
  - G-Unit
  - Ruben Studdard
  - T.I.

=== Best Gospel Album ===
- **Byron Cage – The Prince of Praise (Live at New Birth Cathedral)**
  - Donnie McClurkin – Donnie McClurkin... Again
  - Marvin Sapp – Diary of a Psalmist
  - Vickie Winans – Bringing it All Together

== Performers ==
- The Isley Brothers and Kim Johnson (from JS)
- Michelle Williams
- Nelly
- Murphy Lee
- Jermaine Dupri
- Alicia Keys
- Outkast and Sleepy Brown
- R. Kelly
- Ruben Studdard
- Usher, Lil Jon, Fonzworth Bentley and Ludacris
