= J.E. Heartbreak 2 =

J.E. Heartbreak II

Studio album by Jagged Edge
- Released: October 27, 2014
- Length: 39:24
- Label: So So Def; Hard Case; Primary Wave; BMG; RED; Sony
- Producer: Jermaine Dupri; Brandon Casey; Brian Casey; Bryan-Michael Cox; Clifford Henson

Jagged Edge chronology
The Remedy (2011)	J.E. Heartbreak II (2014)	Layover (2017)

Singles from J.E. Heartbreak II
- 1. "Hope" Released: June 17, 2014

J.E. Heartbreak II is the eighth studio album by American R&B group Jagged Edge. It was released on October 27, 2014, by So So Def Recordings and Hard Case Records. It is a sequel to their multi-platinum album J.E. Heartbreak (2000).

== Singles ==
The first official single is "Hope" which was released on June 17, 2014, on iTunes. The official music video for "Hope" was released on July 29, 2014.

== Critical reception ==
Professional ratings
Review scores
Source	Rating
AllMusic	3.5/5 stars
Parlé	4/5 stars

AllMusic editor Andy Kellman rated the album three and a half out of five stars. He noted that Jagged Edge "keep their circle small here, with only a handful of additional associates. It largely pays off. The album, presented as a sequel to their 2000 commercial breakthrough, is heavy on the type of slow jams – vulnerable but swaggering with deeply resonant basslines – for which the group has been known. There's a particularly fine stretch from the fourth through sixth tracks, all plush ballads [...] Jagged Edge's attitude here seems to be a commendable "This is us, take it or leave it." They have one of their better albums to show for it." Parlé's Kevin Benoit concluded that "as per usual, especially on the recent material from the group, there isn’t much room for anything besides hit records. I challenge any listener to find a track they want to skip over. It makes sense though that after almost 15 years in the business they have perfected the art of creating a perfect song and ultimately a perfect album."

== Commercial performance ==
The album debuted at number 28 on the Billboard 200 chart, with first-week sales of 12,572 copies in the United States. In its second, the album dropped to number 75 on the chart, selling 5,493 copies, bringing its total album sales to 18,000 copies.

== Track listing ==
J.E. Heartbreak 2 track listing
No.	Title	Writer(s)	Producer(s)	Length
1.	"JE Intro"	Francis Cabrel; Jermaine Dupri	Dupri	0:42
2.	"Future"	Brandon Casey; Brian Casey; Bryan-Michael Cox; Willie Darrel Rhodes	Cox; Brandon Casey; Brian Casey	3:47
3.	"Familiar"	Brandon Casey; Brian Casey; Cox; Dupri; Chris Ray	Dupri; Cox	3:20
4.	"Hope"	Brandon Casey; Brian Casey; Cox; Clifford Henson	Wiz; Cox	3:37
5.	"Things I Do For You"	Brandon Casey; Brian Casey; Cox; Dupri	Dupri; Cox	2:38
6.	"Love Come Down"	Brandon Casey; Albert Brown; Cox; Henson; Kyle West	Wiz; Cox	3:34
7.	"It's Been You"	Brandon Casey; Brian Casey	Cox	2:45
8.	"Wanna Be (Romeo)"	Brandon Casey; Brian Casey	Dupri; Cox	2:51
9.	"Getting Over You"	Brandon Casey; Brian Casey; Cox; Greg Dempsey; Dupri	Dupri; Cox	4:05
10.	"Ready"	Brandon Casey; Brian Casey; Cox; Henson	Wiz; Cox	4:13
11.	"Make It Clear"	Brandon Casey; Brian Casey; Cox; Henson	Casey; Cox	3:38
12.	"No Half Steppin"	Brandon Casey; Brian Casey; Brandon Chaney; Rhodes	Brandon Casey; Brian Casey	3:30
13.	"Posters (We Stay On One)"	Brandon Casey; Brian Casey; Brandon Chaney; Rhodes	Brandon Casey; Brian Casey	3:25
Total length:				39:24

iTunes bonus track
No.	Title	Writer(s)	Producer(s)	Length
14.	"Posters" (Remix)	Brian Casey; Brandon Chaney; Rhodes	Brandon Casey; Brian Casey	3:54

== Charts ==
Weekly chart performance for J.E. Heartbreak 2
Chart (2014)	Peak position
UK Independent Albums (OCC)	48
UK R&B Albums (OCC)	11
US Billboard 200	28
US Top R&B/Hip-Hop Albums (Billboard)	3
US Independent Albums (Billboard)	5
