= He Can't Love U =

1999 single by Jagged Edge

Single by Jagged Edge

from the album J.E. Heartbreak
- Released: November 16, 1999
- Recorded: 1999
- Genre: R&B
- Length: 4:04
- Label: So So Def
- Songwriter(s): Brian Casey; Brandon Casey; Bryan-Michael Cox
- Producer(s): Bryan-Michael Cox

Jagged Edge singles chronology
"Keys to the Range" (1998)	"He Can't Love U" (1999)	"Let's Get Married" (2000)

Music video
- "He Can't Love U" on YouTube

"He Can't Love U" is a song performed by American contemporary R&B group Jagged Edge, issued as the second single from their second studio album J.E. Heartbreak. Co-written by group members Brian and Brandon Casey, the song peaked at #15 on the Billboard Hot 100 in 1999.

The song was certified gold by the RIAA on January 19, 2000.

== Music video ==
The official music video for "He Can't Love U" was directed by Tim Story.

== Charts ==
=== Weekly charts ===
Chart (1999–2000)	Peak position
US Billboard Hot 100	15
US Hot R&B/Hip-Hop Songs (Billboard)	3

=== Year-end charts ===
Chart (2000)	Position
US Billboard Hot 100	62
US Hot R&B/Hip-Hop Songs (Billboard)	17

== Certifications ==
Region	Certification	Certified units/sales
United States (RIAA)	Gold	500,000^{^}
^{^} Shipments figures based on certification alone.
