= A Jagged Era =

Studio album by Jagged Edge
- Released: October 21, 1997
- Label: So So Def; Columbia
- Producer: Jermaine Dupri (also exec.); Zeebo (ass. exec.); Darcy Aldridge; Carl Breeding; Flash Technology; Manuel Seal; Gary Smith; Them Damn Twins

Jagged Edge chronology
A Jagged Era (1997)	J.E. Heartbreak (2000)

Singles from A Jagged Era
- 1. "The Way That You Talk" Released: August 2, 1997; 2. "I Gotta Be" Released: December 5, 1997

A Jagged Era is the debut studio album by American R&B group Jagged Edge, released on October 21, 1997, by So So Def and Columbia Records. The quartet worked with So So Def head Jermaine Dupri and his protégé Manuel Seal on the majority of the album. Additional production was provided by Gary Smith, Darcy Aldridge, Carl Breedings, Flash Technology, and Them Damn Twins.

The album peaked at a number 104 on the US Billboard 200 and at number 19 on the Top R&B/Hip-Hop Albums. Despite its disappointing peak, it was moderately successful with sales of over 500,000 copies in the United States, earning a Gold certification by the Recording Industry Association of America (RIAA). A Jagged Era produced two singles, including "The Way That You Talk" and follow-up "I Gotta Be," the latter of which peaked at number 23 on the US Billboard Hot 100.

== Promotion ==
Three singles from the album were released. Lead single "The Way That You Talk" peaked at a number 34 on Billboard' US Hot R&B/Hip-Hop Singles & Tracks chart, while becoming their first single to chart on the US Billboard Hot 100. Follow-up "I Gotta Be" performed better on the charts, peaking at number 11 on the Hot R&B/Hip-Hop Singles & Tracks chart and number 23 on the Billboard Hot 100, becoming the first Top 40 single. "I Gotta Be" had two videos shot for the song, one in 1997 and one in 1998 which featured Jagged Edge with members of Destiny's Child, with Kelly Rowland in the first shot, LeToya Luckett in the second shot, LaTavia Roberson in third and Beyoncé Knowles in the final shot before Jagged Edge takes over the rest of the video.

== Critical reception ==
Professional ratings
Review scores
Source	Rating
AllMusic	4/5 stars

AllMusic editor John Bush wrote: "A Bone Thugs-n-Harmony with more polish to their harmonies and fewer rough edges image-wise, Jagged Edge performs well on their debut album [...] There are a few songs that don't work at all on A Jagged Era, but for the most part, the quartet sounds interesting." Billboard noted that A Jagged Era was "packed with potential hits."

== Commercial performance ==
A Jagged Era peaked at number 104 on the US Billboard 200 and number 19 on the Top R&B/Hip-Hop Albums chart. On December 3, 1998, it was certified Gold by the Recording Industry Association of America (RIAA) based on shipments figures in excess of 500,000 units. By June 2001, the album had sold 613,000 units domestically. In 2009, A Jagged Era was the best-selling album in cassette format.

== Track listing ==
A Jagged Era track listing
No.	Title	Writer(s)	Producer(s)	Length
1.	"Slow Motion"	Brandon Casey; Brian Casey; Jermaine Dupri; Manuel Seal	Dupri; Seal	3:42
2.	"Addicted to Your Love"	Brandon Casey; Brian Casey; Dupri; Seal	Dupri; Seal	3:15
3.	"I Gotta Be"	Brandon Casey; Brian Casey; Dupri; Seal	Dupri; Seal	3:35
4.	"Wednesday Lover"	Aldyn St. John; Charlie Wilson; Roman Johnson; Ronnie Wilson	Dupri	4:31
5.	"Funny How"	Brandon Casey; Brian Casey; Gary Smith	Smith	5:11
6.	"The Way That You Talk" (featuring Da Brat & Jermaine Dupri)	Brandon Casey; Brian Casey; Dupri; Da Brat	Dupri	3:38
7.	"The Rest of Our Lives"	Brandon Casey; Brian Casey; Darcy Aldridge; Carl Breedings	Aldridge; Breedings; Flash	5:35
8.	"I'll Be Right There" (featuring Busta Rhymes)	Brandon Casey; Brian Casey; Dupri; Seal; Busta Rhymes	Dupri	3:45
9.	"Ready & Willing"	Brandon Casey; Brian Casey; Aldridge; Breedings	Aldridge; Breedings; Flash; Them Damn Twins^{[a]}	4:58
10.	"Ain't No Stoppin'"	Alisa Peoples; Jonah Ellis; Lonnie Simmons	Dupri	4:35
Total length:				42:03

Notes

- ^{^[a]} denotes co-producer(s)

Sample credits

- "Ain't No Stoppin'" contains a portion of "Don't Stop the Music" (1980) performed by Yarbrough and Peoples.

== Charts ==
=== Weekly charts ===
Weekly chart performance for A Jagged Era
Chart (1997)	Peak position
US Billboard 200	104
US Top R&B/Hip-Hop Albums (Billboard)	19

=== Year-end charts ===
Year-end chart performance for A Jagged Era
Chart (1998)	Position
US Top R&B/Hip-Hop Albums (Billboard)	51

== Certifications ==
Certifications for A Jagged Era
Region	Certification	Certified units/sales
United States (RIAA)	Gold	500,000^{^}
^{^} Shipments figures based on certification alone.
