= Pitch Black =

Pitch Black may refer to:

== Film ==
- Pitch Black (film), a 2000 science fiction movie
- Pitch Black, the boogeyman in the animated film Rise of the Guardians

== Music ==
- Pitch Black Records, a Cyprus-based record label established in 2007
- Pitch Black (band), a New Zealand electronica band
- Pitch Black (album), or the title song, by Rifftera, 2015
- Pitch Black (EP), or the title song, by Meshuggah, 2013
- "Pitch Black", song by Chris Brown from Breezy
- "Pitch Black", song by Tove Lo from Blue Lips
- "Pitch Black", song by Vicetone

== Other uses ==
- Exercise Pitch Black, a biennial international military exercise hosted by the Royal Australian Air Force
- Mountain Dew Pitch Black, a flavor of the soft drink Mountain Dew
