= Walked Outta Heaven =

Single by Jagged Edge

from the album Hard
- B-side: "Girls Gone Wild"
- Released: September 20, 2003
- Recorded: 2003
- Genre: R&B
- Length: 4:30
- Label: So So; Sony
- Songwriter(s): Brian Casey; Brandon Casey; Bryan-Michael Cox
- Producer(s): Cox

Jagged Edge singles chronology
"Trade It All, Pt. 2" (2002)	"Walked Outta Heaven" (2003)	"My Baby" (2003)

"Walked Outta Heaven" is the second single released by R&B group Jagged Edge from their 2003 fourth studio album Hard.

The single peaked at number six on the Billboard Hot 100 in December 2003, making it the group's second best performing single on that chart. It also peaked at number 21 on the UK Singles Chart.

== Remix ==
The official remix of "Walked Outta Heaven" features rapper Scarface. The remix's instrumental sampled "Be Real Black for Me" by Roberta Flack & Donny Hathaway.

== Track listing ==
1. "Walked Outta Heaven"
2. "Girls Gone Wild" (featuring Major Damage)

== Charts ==
=== Weekly charts ===
Chart (2003–2004)	Peak position
New Zealand (Recorded Music NZ)	13
Scotland (OCC)	72
UK Singles (OCC)	21
UK Hip Hop/R&B (OCC)	4
US Billboard Hot 100	6
US Hot R&B/Hip-Hop Songs (Billboard)	2
US Rhythmic (Billboard)	5

=== Year-end charts ===
Chart (2003)	Position
US Hot R&B/Hip-Hop Songs (Billboard)	48
Chart (2004)	Position
US Hot R&B/Hip-Hop Songs (Billboard)	24
