= Where the Party At =

2001 single by Jagged Edge

Single by Jagged Edge featuring Nelly

from the album Jagged Little Thrill
- Released: May 15, 2001
- Length: 3:52
- Label: So So Def; Columbia
- Songwriters: Brian Casey; Brandon Casey; Cornell Haynes; Jermaine Mauldin; Bryan-Michael Cox
- Producers: Jermaine Dupri; Bryan-Michael Cox

Jagged Edge singles chronology
| "Puppy Love" (2001) | "Where the Party At" (2001) | "Goodbye" (2001) |

Nelly singles chronology
| "Ride wit Me" (2001) | "Where the Party At" (2001) | "Batter Up" (2001) |

Music videos
- "Where the Party At" on YouTube; "Where the Party At" (remix) on YouTube

"Where the Party At" is a song by American R&B group Jagged Edge featuring American rapper Nelly. The song spent three weeks at number-one on the US R&B chart. It was the group's highest-charting single on the US Billboard Hot 100, spending five weeks at number three in September 15, 2001. The song was nominated for Best Rap/Sung Collaboration at the 44th Grammy Awards in 2002, a new category at the time. It lost to Eve and Gwen Stefani's "Let Me Blow Ya Mind".

== Background ==
"Where the Party At" was written by Jagged Edge members Brian and Brandon Casey along with Nelly and its producers, Jermaine Dupri and Bryan-Michael Cox, for the group's third studio album Jagged Little Thrill (2001). While Durpi and Jagged Edge initially focused on producing ballads, the success of the "Let's Get Married (Remix)" encouraged a shift toward uptempo material, with "Where the Party At" ermerging as the first uptempo record created for the album. A guitar element was incorporated early in the production, reflecting a broader trend in Dupri's work at the time.

== Remix ==
The official remix of "Where the Party At", titled the "11-01-01" remix, was done by Jermaine Dupri and features him alongside Da Brat, Lil Bow Wow, R.O.C., and Tigah.

== Track listings ==
US CD single

1. "Where the Party At" (LP mix) – 3:54
2. "Let's Get Married" (Remarqable remix) – 4:09

US maxi-CD single

1. "Where the Party At" (LP mix) – 3:54
2. "Where the Party At" (11-01-01 extended remix) – 5:02
3. "Where the Party At" (11-01-01 remix) – 3:53
4. "Where the Party At" (Speakeasy dub mix) – 7:37
5. "Where the Party At" (11-01-01 remix instrumental) – 3:46

US 12-inch single

A1. "Where the Party At" (LP mix) – 3:54
A2. "Where the Party At" (LP instrumental) – 3:54
B1. "Where the Party At" (Speakeasy remix) – 6:00
B2. "Where the Party At" (Speakeasy dub mix) – 7:37
B3. "Where the Party At" (Speakeasy instrumental) – 7:37

UK CD single

1. "Where the Party At" (LP version)
2. "Where the Party At" (JD remix)
3. "Where the Party At" (8 Jam remix)

UK 12-inch single

A1. "Where the Party At" (LP version)
A2. "Where the Party At" (JD remix)
B1. "Where the Party At" (8 Jam remix)
B2. "Where the Party At" (Speakeasy remix)

European CD single

1. "Where the Party At" (LP version) – 3:53
2. "Where the Party At" (11-01-01 Dupri remix) – 3:53

European maxi-CD single

1. "Where the Party At" (LP version)
2. "Where the Party At" (11-01-01 Dupri mix)
3. "Where the Party At" (Speakeasy remix)
4. "Where the Party At" (video version)

Australian CD single

1. "Where the Party At"
2. "Where the Party At" (LP mix without Nelly)
3. "Where the Party At" (Speakeasy remix)
4. "Where the Party At" (11-01-01 Dupri remix)
5. "Let's Get Married" (MetroMix radio remix)

== Charts ==
=== Weekly charts ===
| Chart (2001) | Peak position |
|---|---|
| Australia (ARIA) | 13 |
| Australian Urban (ARIA) | 5 |
| Canada (Nielsen SoundScan) | 17 |
| Europe (Eurochart Hot 100) | 42 |
| France (SNEP) | 49 |
| Germany (GfK) | 37 |
| Netherlands (Dutch Top 40) | 38 |
| Netherlands (Single Top 100) | 29 |
| New Zealand (Recorded Music NZ) | 33 |
| Scotland Singles (OCC) | 66 |
| Switzerland (Schweizer Hitparade) | 45 |
| UK Singles (OCC) | 25 |
| UK Dance (OCC) | 13 |
| UK Hip Hop/R&B (OCC) | 8 |
| US Billboard Hot 100 | 3 |
| US Dance Singles Sales (Billboard) Remixes | 1 |
| US Hot R&B/Hip-Hop Songs (Billboard) | 1 |
| US Pop Airplay (Billboard) | 10 |
| US Rhythmic Airplay (Billboard) | 3 |

=== Year-end charts ===
| Chart (2001) | Position |
|---|---|
| Australia (ARIA) | 95 |
| Canada (Nielsen SoundScan) | 81 |
| US Billboard Hot 100 | 16 |
| US Hot R&B/Hip-Hop Singles & Tracks (Billboard) | 4 |
| US Maxi-Singles Sales (Billboard) | 17 |
| US Mainstream Top 40 (Billboard) | 55 |
| US Rhythmic Top 40 (Billboard) | 9 |

| Chart (2002) | Position |
|---|---|
| US Maxi-Singles Sales (Billboard) | 7 |

== Certifications ==
| Region | Certification | Certified units/sales |
|---|---|---|
| New Zealand (RMNZ) | Platinum | 30,000^{‡} |
| United Kingdom (BPI) | Silver | 200,000^{‡} |
^{‡} Sales+streaming figures based on certification alone.

== Release history ==
| Region | Date | Format(s) | Label(s) | Ref. |
|---|---|---|---|---|
| United States | May 15, 2001 | Rhythmic contemporary; urban radio | So So Def; Columbia | |
| United States | June 19, 2001 | Contemporary hit radio | So So Def; Columbia | |
| Australia | September 10, 2001 | CD | Columbia | |
| United Kingdom | October 15, 2001 | 12-inch vinyl; CD | Columbia | |
