= Jagged Edge (American group) =

American R&B group from Georgia

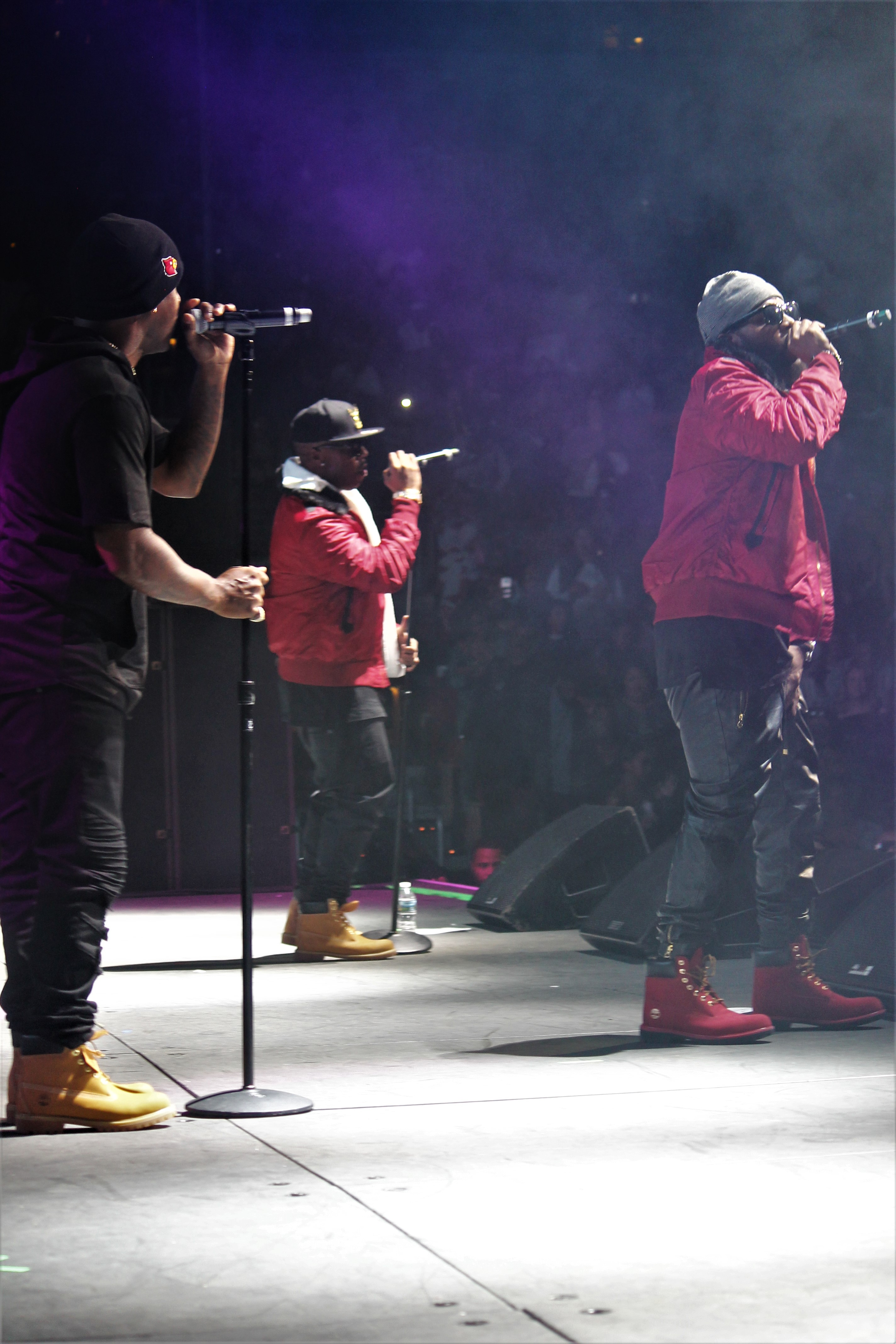
- Jagged Edge performing in 2017

Background information
- Origin: Atlanta, Georgia, U.S.
- Genre: R&B
- Years active: 1995–present
- Labels: Hardcase; BMG; Primary Wave; 581; Slip-N-Slide; Island; Sony Urban; Columbia; So So Def
- Members: Brian Casey; Brandon Casey; Richard Wingo; Kyle Norman
- Website: officialje.com

Logo
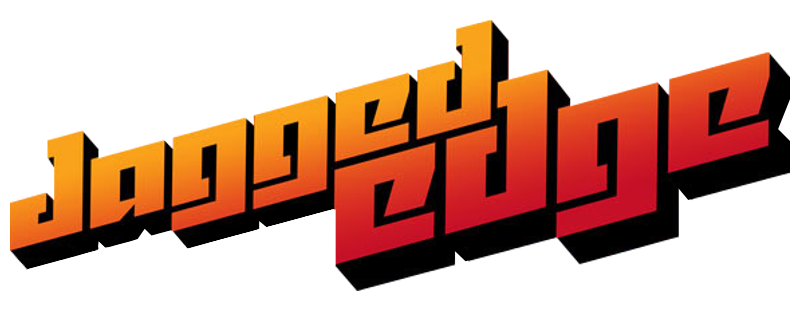

Jagged Edge is an American R&B group from Atlanta, Georgia. The group, initially signed to record producer Jermaine Dupri's So So Def Recordings, is best known for their string of hit singles including "Let's Get Married" and "Where the Party At" (featuring Nelly), most of which were produced by Dupri. The group's members include identical twin lead singers Brian and Brandon Casey as well as Richard Wingo and Kyle Norman. The group's debut album, A Jagged Era (1997), performed modestly at the time of its release but achieved gold status; however, their subsequent albums until 2007 all became commercial successes—debuting within the top 10 of the Billboard 200.

Wingo was a late addition to the group, added after a recommendation from Kandi Burruss of Xscape. Burruss was also the one who brought the group to the attention of Dupri, who signed them to his Columbia Records distributed imprint, So So Def Recordings. The name Jagged Edge is derived from the lyrics of the beginning of RZA's verse on the song "Snakes" on rapper Ol' Dirty Bastard's debut album Return to the 36 Chambers: The Dirty Version: "Jagged Edge, Rockhead God, hard as Stonehenge..."

== History ==
=== 1997–2000: A Jagged Era and J.E. Heartbreak ===
Jagged Edge began their mainstream recording career with the single "The Way That You Talk". They followed this in 1997 with the album, A Jagged Era which went gold, featuring the singles "I Gotta Be" and "The Way That You Talk". "I Gotta Be", which was written by the twins, reached number 11 on the R&B charts and number 23 on the Hot 100.

Following up on their debut album, Jagged Edge released J.E. Heartbreak in 2000. The album was the group's breakthrough album with several popular singles. The album went double platinum and had the hit single "Let's Get Married" which topped the R&B charts and reached number 11 on the Hot 100. The album's second single, "He Can't Love U" had similar success, reaching number 3 on the R&B charts and number 15 on the Hot 100. It also featured the track "Promise", which reached number 1 on the R&B charts and number 9 on the Hot 100.

=== 2001–2003: Jagged Little Thrill and Hard ===
The group's third release, Jagged Little Thrill, was released in 2001 and went platinum. Its success was in large part, due to the up-tempo "Where the Party At" which reached number 1 on the R&B charts and number 3 on the Hot 100, the group's highest-charting single.

Jagged Edge's fourth album, Hard, was released in 2003 and went gold. The album's single "Walked Outta Heaven" performed well on the charts, reaching number 6 on the Hot 100 and number 2 on the R&B charts.

=== 2006–2011: Jagged Edge, Baby Makin' Project and The Remedy ===
Jagged Edge's fifth album, Jagged Edge, was released on May 9, 2006, by Columbia/Sony Music Urban and it went gold. It featured the hit urban single "Good Luck Charm". Also released on November 21, 2006, was The Hits collection featuring Jagged Edge's biggest hits plus a few album tracks. The album shared the single "Stunnas" that's also on the Jagged Edge album as a bonus track.

Jagged Edge parted ways with Columbia Records shortly after the release of their self-titled fifth album and signed back with Dupri. Dupri re-signed the group to So So Def through Island Def Jam, which handles the distribution for So So Def, and where Dupri was president of the urban division. The group was also granted their own record label called 581 Muzik Groupe which was credited on their album, Baby Makin' Project.

The only single released off Baby Makin' Project was "Put a Little Umph in it" featuring Ashanti. It reached number 49 on the Hot R&B/Hip-Hop Songs Chart. The group recorded so much material for the project that they have saved eight of the tracks for another album, a release date for which has not been announced.

Jagged Edge signed to Slip-N-Slide Records in May 2009. The album titled "The Remedy" was released on June 21, 2011. The project had one collaboration with Rick Ross. The first warm-up single from "The Remedy" is "Tip of My Tongue" featuring Slip 'N Slide Records' labelmate Trina and Gucci Mane. A second warm-up single, "Lay You Down", was released before the "official" single titled "Baby".

=== 2014–2020: J.E. Heartbreak II and Layover ===
The group released their eighth studio album titled J.E. Heartbreak 2 on October 27, 2014. On May 15, released their first single titled "Hope." The song was co-written by brothers Brian and Brandon Casey.

In November 2016, they released a new greatest hits album, featuring re-recorded versions of their biggest hit singles.

In 2017, they recorded an episode of TV One's Unsung series, which premiered on July 9. They also announced the release of their ninth studio album Layover set for release on the same day. However, it was delayed and finally released a day later.

In late 2018, they announced a new single "He Ain't Sh*t" featuring Ty Dolla Sign.

In 2019, the group released the single "Closest Thing to Perfect" and announced they are working on their 10th album. On June 12, the group announced on their official Instagram that their 10th studio album A Jagged Love Story will be releasing on July 15, 2019.

The album, A Jagged Love Story, was released July 30, 2020.

2025–present: All Original Parts: Volume 1

The group released their 11th studio album titled “All Original Parts: Volume 1” on 14th February 2025. It featured the single “Just Might Get It” which was released on 17th January 2025.

Volume 2 has been announced as “coming soon” by the group, though an official release date has not yet been finalized.

== Members ==
Current

- Brian Casey (1995–present)
- Brandon Casey (1995–present)
- Richard Wingo (1995–present)
- Kyle Norman (1995–present)

== Discography ==
Studio albums

- A Jagged Era (1997)
- J.E. Heartbreak (2000)
- Jagged Little Thrill (2001)
- Hard (2003)
- Jagged Edge (2006)
- Baby Makin' Project (2007)
- The Remedy (2011)
- J.E. Heartbreak 2 (2014)
- Layover (2017)
- A Jagged Love Story (2020)
- All Original Parts: Volume 1 (2025)
- Kyle Norman (2025)

== Awards and nominations ==
American Music Award

Year	Nominee / work	Award	Result
2001	Jagged Edge	Favorite Soul/R&B Band/Duo/Group	Nominated
2002	Jagged Edge	Favorite Soul/R&B Band/Duo/Group	Nominated
2006	Jagged Edge	Favorite Soul/R&B Band/Duo/Group	Nominated

BET Awards

Year	Nominee / work	Award	Result
2001	Jagged Edge	Best Group	Nominated
2002	Jagged Edge	Best Group	Nominated
2003	Jagged Edge	Best Group	Nominated

Grammy Award

Year	Nominee / work	Award	Result
2002	"Where the Party At" (featuring Nelly)	Best Rap/Sung Collaboration	Nominated

Soul Train Music Awards

Year	Nominee / work	Award	Result
2001	"Let's Get Married"	Best R&B/Soul Single, Group, Band or Duo	Won
2001	J.E. Heartbreak	Best R&B/Soul Album, Group Band or Duo	Won
2002	"Where the Party At" (featuring Nelly)	Best R&B/Soul Single, Group, Band or Duo	Nominated
2002	Jagged Little Thrill	Best R&B/Soul Album, Group Band or Duo	Nominated
2004	"Walked Outta Heaven"	Best R&B/Soul Single, Group, Band or Duo	Nominated
2007	"Good Luck Charm"	Best R&B/Soul Single, Group, Band or Duo	Nominated
2007	Jagged Edge	Best R&B/Soul Album, Group Band or Duo	Nominated
