= Jagged Edge (Jagged Edge album) =

Studio album by Jagged Edge
- Released: May 9, 2006
- Length: 56:27
- Label: Columbia
- Producers: Brandon Casey (also exec.); Brian Casey (also exec.); Pitch Black; The Clutch; Corna Boyz; Don Vito; Jermaine Dupri; Chad Elliott; Hakim Young; Jermaine Mobley

Jagged Edge chronology
Hard (2003)	Jagged Edge (2006)	The Hits (2006)

Singles from Jagged Edge
- 1. "So Amazing" Released: 2005; 2. "Good Luck Charm" Released: 2006; 3. "Season's Change" Released: 2006; 4. "Stunnas" Released: 2006

Jagged Edge is the fifth studio album by American R&B group Jagged Edge. It was released by Columbia Records on May 9, 2006 in the United States. Chiefly produced by band members Brandon and Brian Casey, it features additional production from Chad "Dr. Ceuss" Elliott, John "Cheese" Williams, Don Vito, and songwriting collective The Clutch as well as Dwayne Nesmith and Pierre Medor from Corna Boyz. Julio Voltio, Big Duke and John Legend appear as guest vocalists on the album.

The album earned mixed to negative reviews from music critics some of whom felt that it was repetitious but praised Jagged Edge's vocal performances. It debuted at number four on the US Billboard 200 and number two on the Top R&B/Hip-Hop Albums chart, with first-week sales of 115,000 copies. Jagged Edge produced four singles, including "So Amazing", "Season's Change", "Stunnas" and "Good Luck Charm," the latter of which was certified Gold the by the Recording Industry Association of America (RIAA).

== Promotion ==
Jagged Edge produced four singles, including lead single "So Amazing" and follow-up "Good Luck Charm," which peaked at number 13 on the US Hot R&B/Hip-Hop Songs chart and was certfified Gold by the Recording Industry Association of America (RIAA) on June 15, 2007, becoming the album's highest-charting single. "Season's Change" was issued as the album's third single, while "Stunnas" featuring Jermaine Dupri was selected as the fourth and final single from Jagged Edge.

== Crtitical reception ==
Professional ratings
Review scores
Source	Rating
About.com	4/5 stars
AllMusic	3/5 stars
PopMatters	3/10
Vibe	3/5 marks

AllMusic editor Andy Kellman rated the album three ouf of five stars. He found that the "album offers little change from what preceded it [...] The Casey twins remain in control on all of the material and wisely keep the few guest appearances low-key. The only real surprise is that the group doesn't turn strictly to rappers [...] Despite a slightly greater proportion of club-oriented tracks, this album is standard-issue Jagged Edge, which is enough to keep them rolling as steadily as they have for the past several years." Laura Checkoway, writing for Vibe, remarked that "Jagged Edge has always been those ’hood cats who harmonize about relationships, occasionally with endearing cheesiness. And while their gritty-yetgorgeous vocals have ripened over the years, the same can’t be said of their songwriting. But Jagged Edge's emotive delivery compensates for the bumps." She also rated the album three ouf of five.

Entertainment Weekly editor Josh Tyrangiel felt that Jagged Edge "dips an awkward toe into Cinemax territory on its fifth album, Jagged Edge. "Watch You," an otherwise predictable ode to voyeurism, includes the least seductive lyric in R&B history. (It's far too long to quote, but it does feature the word "undies.") "Sexy American Girls" fares better thanks to a trilling Spanish guitar hook and sharp, tense production, but Jagged Edge are far too earnest to make lasciviousness compelling. Their hips may be willing, but their hearts don’t follow." Mike Joseph from PopMatters noted: "While the Jagged Edge guys unquestionably have the pipes necessary for the task, their material is sorely lacking. Even the reappearance of their mentor Dupri on two tracks isn't enough to make this disc even the slightest bit more listenable. Unless the same tired, ghetto buzzwords like "gangsta," "pimpin'," and the like turn your crank, Jagged Edge is best left on the record store shelf."

== Commercial performance ==
Jagged Edge debuted at number four on the US Billboard 200 and number two on the Top R&B/Hip-Hop Albums chart, with first-week sales of 115,000 copies, While it was Jagged Edge's fourth consecutive album to reach the top ten on both charts, it was marked their first regular project not to be certified by the Recording Industry Association of America (RIAA).

== Track listing ==
Jagged Edge track listing
No.	Title	Writer(s)	Producer(s)	Length
1.	"Intro"	Brandon Casey; Brian Casey; Chris Spruell	Dwayne Nesmith	1:43
2.	"Ghetto Guitar"	Brandon Casey; Brian Casey; Spruell	Brandon Casey; Brian Casey	4:00
3.	"So High"	Brandon Casey; Brian Casey; Samuel Barnes; Anthony Cruz; Cory McKay; Dave Atkinson; Inga Marchand; Jean-Claude Olivier; Nasir Jones	Jermaine Dupri	3:18
4.	"Watch You"	Brandon Casey; Brian Casey; Spruell	Brandon Casey; Brian Casey; Chris Spruell^{[a]}	4:49
5.	"Hopefully"	Brandon Casey; Brian Casey; Spruell	Brandon Casey; Brian Casey; Spruell^{[a]}	3:42
6.	"Get a Lil' Bit of This"	Brandon Casey; Brian Casey; Spruell	Brandon Casey; Brian Casey; Spruell^{[a]}	4:07
7.	"Crying Out" (featuring Bad Girl)	Brandon Casey; Brian Casey	Brandon Casey; Brian Casey	3:40
8.	"Good Luck Charm"	Brandon Casey; Brian Casey; Chad "Dr. Ceuss" Elliott; John Williams; Rodney Richard	Elliott; Cheese; Don Vito	4:24
9.	"So Amazing" (featuring Julio Voltio)	Brandon Casey; Brian Casey; Jermaine Dupri; Julio Irving Ramos Filomeno; PJ Morton	Dupri	3:40
10.	"Season's Change" (featuring John Legend)	Brandon Casey; Brian Casey; Nesmith; Pierre Medor	Brandon Casey; Brian Casey; Tha Corna Boyz^{[a]}	3:46
11.	"Questions"	Brandon Casey; Brian Casey; Spruell	Brandon Casey; Brian Casey; Spruell^{[a]}	4:18
12.	"Sexy American Girls" (featuring Big Duke)	Brandon Casey; Brian Casey; Williams; Lee Dixon; Richard	Cheese; Don Vito	4:11
13.	"Baby Feel Me"	Brandon Casey; Brian Casey; Nesmith; Medor	Brandon Casey; Brian Casey; Tha Corna Boyz^{[a]}	3:46
14.	"Who U Wit?"	Brandon Casey; Brian Casey; Nesmith; Medor	Brandon Casey; Brian Casey; Tha Corna Boyz^{[a]}	3:15
15.	"Ass Hypnotic"	Brandon Casey; Brian Casey; Moses Barrett III	Brandon Casey; Brian Casey	3:48
Total length:				56:27

Standard edition (bonus track)
No.	Title	Writer(s)	Producer(s)	Length
16.	"I Ain't Here for This" (featuring Sosa)	Brandon Casey; Brian Casey; Chris Spruell	Brandon Casey; Brian Casey	4:35

International edition (bonus track)
No.	Title	Writer(s)	Producer(s)	Length
17.	"Stunnas" (featuring Jermaine Dupri)	Patrick "J. Que" Smith; Balewa Muhammed; Candice Nelson; Ezekiel Lewis; Hakim Young	Pitch Black The Clutch	4:40

iTunes edition (bonus track)
No.	Title	Writer(s)	Producer(s)	Length
18.	"See Me Looking"	Brandon Casey; Brian Casey; Williams; Richard	Cheese; Don Vito	3:57

Notes and samples

- ^{^[a]} signifies co-producer
- "So High" contains interpolations of "Affirmative Action" by Nas.

== Charts ==
=== Weekly charts ===
Weekly chart performance for Jagged Edge
Chart (2006)	Peak position
UK R&B Albums (Official Charts)	8
US Billboard 200	4
US Top R&B/Hip-Hop Albums (Billboard)	2

=== Year-end charts ===
Year-end chart performance for Jagged Edge
Chart (2006)	Position
US Top R&B/Hip-Hop Albums (Billboard)	56
