= Promise (Jagged Edge song) =

2000 single by Jagged Edge

Single by Jagged Edge

from the album J.E. Heartbreak
- Released: October 17, 2000
- Length: 4:34
- Label: So So Def
- Songwriters: Brian Casey; Brandon Casey; Gary Smith; Bert Young; Jermaine Dupri; Bryan-Michael Cox
- Producer: Jermaine Dupri

Jagged Edge singles chronology
"Let's Get Married" (2000)	"Promise" (2000)	"Puppy Love" (2001)

"Promise" is a song by American R&B group Jagged Edge. The song spent two weeks at number one on the US Billboard Hot R&B/Hip-Hop Singles & Tracks chart and peaked at number nine on the Billboard Hot 100, ranking in at number 48 on the 2001 Billboard Hot 100 Year End chart. In Australia, the song was released as a double A-side with "Let's Get Married" and peaked at number two on the ARIA Singles Chart.

== Charts ==
=== Weekly charts ===
Weekly chart performance for "Promise"
Chart (2001)	Peak position
Australia (ARIA) with "Let's Get Married"	2
Germany (GfK)	83
US Billboard Hot 100	9
US Hot R&B/Hip-Hop Songs (Billboard)	1
US Rhythmic Airplay (Billboard)	7

=== Year-end charts ===
Year-end chart performance for "Promise"
Chart (2001)	Position
Australia (ARIA)	19
US Billboard Hot 100	48
US Hot R&B/Hip-Hop Singles & Tracks (Billboard)	8
US Rhythmic Top 40 (Billboard)	26
