= Good Luck Charm (Jagged Edge song) =

Single by Jagged Edge

from the album Jagged Edge
- Released: 2006
- Recorded: 2005
- Genre: R&B
- Length: 4:24
- Label: Sony Urban Music/Columbia Records
- Songwriters: Brian Casey, Brandon Casey, Chad Elliott, Bobby Johnson, Rod Richards, John Hosea Williams
- Producer: Jermaine Dupri

Jagged Edge singles chronology
"Nasty Girl" (2005)	"Good Luck Charm" (2006)	"Season's Change" (2006)

"Good Luck Charm" is the second single from Jagged Edge's self-titled fifth album Jagged Edge. It was certified gold by the RIAA.

== Charts ==
=== Weekly charts ===
Chart (2006)	Peak position
US Billboard Hot 100	73
US Hot R&B/Hip-Hop Songs (Billboard)	13

=== Year-end charts ===
Chart (2006)	Position
US Hot R&B/Hip-Hop Songs (Billboard)	48

== Certifications ==
Region	Certification	Certified units/sales
United States (RIAA) Mastertone	Gold	500,000^{*}
^{*} Sales figures based on certification alone.
