= Jagged Little Thrill =

2001 album by Jagged Edge

Studio album by Jagged Edge
- Released: June 26, 2001
- Length: 53:59
- Label: So So Def; Columbia
- Producer: Tha Cornaboyz; Bryan Michael Cox; Jermaine Dupri; Kevin Hicks; John Horesco IV; Jagged Edge; Jason Rome; Gary Smith; Ollie Woods; Bert Young

Jagged Edge chronology
J.E. Heartbreak (2000)	Jagged Little Thrill (2001)	Hard (2003)

Singles from Jagged Little Thrill
- 1. "Where the Party At" Released: May 14, 2001; 2. "Goodbye" Released: December 11, 2001; 3. "I Got It 2" Released: 2001

Jagged Little Thrill is the third studio album by American R&B group Jagged Edge. It was released by So So Def and Columbia on June 26, 2001, in the United States. The album's name is a spin on Canadian singer Alanis Morissette's album Jagged Little Pill (1995). The band reunited with So So Def label head Jermaine Dupri and his Bryan-Michael Cox to work on the majority of the album. Additional collaborators include Tha Cornaboyz, Gary Smith, Bert Young, Jason Rome, and Ollie Woods.

The album earned largely positive reviews. It debuted at number three on the US Billboard 200 and at number one on the Top R&B/Hip-Hop Albums chart, outranking the group's previous album, J.E. Heartbreak (1999). Jagged Little Thrill eventually reached Platinum status in the United States and sold more than 1.5 million copies domestically. The album produced three singles, including lead single and US Billboard Hot 100 top three hit "Where the Party At" featuring rapper Nelly.

== Promotion ==
Three singles from Jagged Little Thrill were released. Lead single "Where the Party At" featuring rapper Nelly reached number three on the Billboard Hot 100, becoming the group's second top ten single, and became the band's third chart topper on Billboard's Hot R&B/Hip-Hop Singles & Tracks. Follow-up "Goodbye" became the first single of the group to not reach the Top 40 on the Billboard Hot 100, but reached the top 20 on the Hot R&B/Hip-Hop Singles & Tracks chart. A remade version of the song "I Got It," entitled "I Got It 2" featuring Nas, served as the third and final single from the album.

== Crtitical reception ==
Professional ratings
Review scores
Source	Rating
AllMusic	4/5 stars
NME	3.5/5 stars
USA Today	2.5/4 stars

AllMusic editor William Ruhlmann found that "the Casey brothers are very concerned with promoting responsible behavior among their male peers. Dupri has pushed their more prescriptive sentiments to the end of the album (while making sure the few mid-tempo and up-tempo tracks are near the start), but it is these songs that really define Jagged Edge's viewpoint." NME critic Michael Odell wrote: "Of course there is nothing remotely jagged about them. This is ultra smooth soul aimed straight at the ladies. When they try and go uptempo like on "Where the Party At" they can sound monotonous and uninvolving. Dupri's set-piece skills are showcased but there’s nowhere for these voices to shine." Billboard noted that the "album's strong suit is its fine balance of party tracks and ballads. While the group continues to prove it knows how to croon (see “Best Man" and "Goodbye") the guys also keep the party live with such tracks as "Cut Somethin'"."

== Commercial performance ==
Jagged Little Thrill debuted and peaked at number three on the US Billboard 200 and at number one on the Top R&B/Hip-Hop Albums chart with first-week sales of 215,000 copies, outranking their previous album, J.E. Heartbreak (1999). However, it was not as commercially successful as the group's previous album, though still successful; achieving Platinum status by the Recording Industry Association of America (RIAA). By August 2003, Jagged Little Thrill had sold 1.5 million copies in the US.

== Track listing ==
Jagged Little Thrill track listing
No.	Title	Writer(s)	Producer(s)	Length
1.	"The Saga Continues"	Brandon Casey; Brian Casey; Jermaine Dupri	Dupri	0:45
2.	"Where the Party At" (featuring Nelly)	Brandon Casey; Brian Casey; Dupri; Bryan-Michael Cox; Cornell Haynes, Jr.	Dupri; Cox^{[a]}	3:52
3.	"Goodbye"	Brandon Casey; Brian Casey; Dupri; Cox	Dupri; Cox^{[a]}	4:33
4.	"Cut Somethin'" (featuring Ludacris)	Brandon Casey; Brian Casey; Cox; Jason Perry; Christopher Bridges	Cox; Perry^{[a]}	3:41
5.	"Girl It's Over"	Brandon Casey; Brian Casey; Gary Smith; Bert Young	Smith; Young	4:28
6.	"Can We Be Tight"	Brandon Casey; Brian Casey; Smith	Smith	4:18
7.	"I Got It" (featuring Trina)	Brandon Casey; Brian Casey; Dupri; Cox; Katrina Taylor; Donnie Scantz; Deuce	Dupri; Cox^{[a]}	3:04
8.	"Best Man"	Brandon Casey; Brian Casey; Cox	Cox	4:13
9.	"Without You"	Brandon Casey; Brian Casey; Jason Rome; Ollie Woods	Rome; Woods	3:33
10.	"Driving Me to Drink" (featuring R.O.C.)	Brandon Casey; Brian Casey; Rome; Kevin Hicks	Rome; Hicks^{[a]}	3:23
11.	"This Goes Out" (featuring Big Duke & Joe Blak)	Brandon Casey; Brian Casey; Tha Cornaboyz; Lee Dixon; Tatu Hill	Brandon Casey; Brian Casey; Tha Cornaboyz^{[a]}; Cox^{[b]}	3:30
12.	"Respect"	Brandon Casey; Brian Casey; Dupri; Cox	Dupri; Cox^{[a]}	4:44
13.	"Head of Household"	Brandon Casey; Brian Casey; Smith; Young	Smith; Young; John Horesco IV	4:42
14.	"Remedy"	Brandon Casey; Brian Casey; Cox	Cox	5:13
Total length:				53:59

Japanese bonus track
No.	Title	Writer(s)	Producer(s)	Length
15.	"You Hurt Me"	Brandon Casey; Brian Casey; Dupri; Cox; Nelly	Dupri; Cox^{[a]}	2:40

Notes

- ^{^[a]} denotes co-producer(s)
- ^{^[b]} denotes additional producer(s)

== Charts ==
=== Weekly charts ===
Weekly chart performance for Jagged Little Thrill
Chart (2001)	Peak position
Australian Albums (ARIA)	14
Canadian Albums (Nielsen SoundScan)	31
Canadian R&B Albums (Nielsen SoundScan)	10
German Albums (Offizielle Top 100)	75
New Zealand Albums (RMNZ)	37
UK Albums (OCC)	85
UK R&B Albums (OCC)	14
US Billboard 200	3
US Top R&B/Hip-Hop Albums (Billboard)	1

=== Year-end charts ===
2001 year-end chart performance for Jagged Little Thrill
Chart (2001)	Position
Canadian R&B Albums (Nielsen SoundScan)	48
US Billboard 200	81
US Top R&B/Hip-Hop Albums (Billboard)	44

2002 year-end chart performance for Jagged Little Thrill
Chart (2002)	Position
US Top R&B/Hip-Hop Albums (Billboard)	93

== Certifications ==
Certifications for Jagged Little Thrill
Region	Certification	Certified units/sales
Australia (ARIA)	Gold	35,000^{^}
United Kingdom (BPI)	Silver	60,000^{*}
United States (RIAA)	Platinum	1,000,000^{^}
^{*} Sales figures based on certification alone.^{^} Shipments figures based on certification alone.
