= J.E. Heartbreak =

Studio album by Jagged Edge
- Released: September 18, 1999
- Length: 46:15
- Label: So So Def; Columbia
- Producer: Jagged Edge; Teddy Bishop; Bryan-Michael Cox; Jermaine Dupri; Kevin Hicks; LaMarquis Jefferson; Gary Smith

Jagged Edge chronology
A Jagged Era (1997)	J.E. Heartbreak (1999)	Jagged Little Thrill (2001)

Singles from J.E. Heartbreak
- 1. "Keys to the Range" Released: September 15, 1999; 2. "He Can't Love U" Released: November 16, 1999; 3. "Let's Get Married" Released: April 11, 2000; 4. "Promise" Released: October 2000

J.E. Heartbreak is the second album by the American R&B group Jagged Edge. It was released by So So Def and Columbia on September 18, 1999, in the United States. The title of the album is a reference to R&B group New Edition's 1989 hit "N.E. Heart Break". Upon its release, the album peaked at number 8 on the US Billboard 200 and atop the Top R&B/Hip-Hop Albums. It was also certified Platinum by the Recording Industry Association of America (RIAA) and reached Silver status in United Kingdom.

== Promotion ==
The album spawned four singles, three of which made the Top 20 on the Billboard Hot 100. While lead single "Keys to the Range" became the group's first single not to chart on the latter chart, second single "He Can't Love U" (first appeared on the soundtrack to the 1999 LL Cool J film In Too Deep) reached number 15 on the Hot 100, becoming the group's first Top 20 single, while reaching number 3 on Billboard's Hot R&B/Hip-Hop Singles & Tracks. "Let's Get Married" was the third single released from the album. It reached number 11 on the Hot 100 and was the group's first single to reach number 1 on the Hot R&B/Hip-Hop Singles & Tracks chart. The final single, "Promise", also topped the chart.

== Critical reception ==
Professional ratings
Review scores
Source	Rating
AllMusic	3/5 stars
Entertainment Weekly	B
PopMatters	6.9/10
USA Today	2/4 stars

Vibe editor Joanne Eustache found that "Jagged Edge avoids the sophomore jinx and returns with a solid performance with their new release, J.E. Heartbreak. Group members Wingo, Case, Brasco and Quick — led by founder, producer and label-owner Jermaine Dupri — stick to the formula that slowly but surely brought them gold sales with last year's debut A Jagged Era." AllMusic editor William Ruhlmann felt that J.E. Heartbreak "the group's slavish obeisance to current R&B conventions continued to be its aesthetic stumbling block. As producer/writer Jermaine Dupri's answer to Boyz II Men, Jagged Edge turned out another set full of slow jams indistinguishable from what was already all over urban radio."

PopMatters Mark Anthony Neal found that "Jagged Edge does little to distinguish themselves from the host of wannabes who currently vie for whatever mantle of success New Edition could even hold claim to. Largely produced by Jermaine Dupri and newcomer Bryan-Michael Cox, J.E. Heartbreak, the follow-up to the groups gold selling debut A Jagged Era is as polished as most contemporary R&B; production." Entertainment Weekly' Matt Diehl wrote: "Producer Jermaine Dupri's surprisingly innovative grooves give these soul slicksters an edge over their boys-to-men brethren." Steve Jones from USA Today noted that JE Heartbreak blends "silky ballads" with "street-tempered beats," while emphasizing that the group’s strength remains in romance, though the album "really doesn't break any new ground" in its mix of love songs and danceable tracks.

== Commercial performance ==
J.E. Heartbreak was the week's major debut, landing at number eight on the US Billboard 200 and number one on the US Top R&B/Hip-Hop Albums chart, with more than 86,000 copies sold. The album marked the band's first top ten set. J.E. Heartbreak was certified Gold by the Recording Industry Association of America (RIAA) on February 14, 2000 and reached 2× Platinum status on February 6, 2001.

== Track listing ==
J.E. Heartbreak track listing
No.	Title	Writer(s)	Producer(s)	Length
1.	"Heartbreak"	Brandon Casey; Brian Casey; Bryan Michael Cox	Jermaine Dupri; Cox	1:08
2.	"Did She Say"	Brandon Casey; Brian Casey; Dupri; Cox; Jerry Tineo; Christopher Rios; Lester Fernandez	Dupri; Cox	3:23
3.	"He Can't Love U"	Brandon Casey; Brian Casey; Cox	Cox	4:04
4.	"What You Tryin' to Do"	Brandon Casey; Brian Casey; Cox; Kevin Hicks	Cox; Hicks	4:28
5.	"Girl Is Mine" (featuring Ja Rule & Jermaine Dupri)	Brandon Casey; Brian Casey; Dupri; Jeffrey Atkins; Kit Walker	Dupri; LaMarquis Jefferson	4:21
6.	"Healing"	Brandon Casey; Brian Casey; Cox; Kevin Hicks	Cox; Hicks	3:42
7.	"Let's Get Married"	Brandon Casey; Brian Casey; Dupri; Cox	Dupri; Cox	4:23
8.	"True Man"	Brandon Casey; Brian Casey; Gary Smith	Gary "Gizzo" Smith	4:58
9.	"Can I Get With You"	Brandon Casey; Brian Casey; Smith; Marcus Miller	Smith	4:02
10.	"Promise"	Brandon Casey; Brian Casey; Bert Young; Cox; Smith; Dupri	Dupri; Cox	4:08
11.	"Keys to the Range" (featuring Jermaine Dupri)	Brandon Casey; Brian Casey; Dupri; Cox	Dupri; Cox	3:48
12.	"Lace You"	Brandon Casey; Brian Casey; Ted Bishop	Teddy Bishop	4:00
Total length:				46:15

Samples

- "Did She Say" contains excerpts from "Off the Books" as performed by the Beatnuts.
- "Girl Is Mine" contains excerpts From "Spacewalk" as written by Kit Walker.
- "Can I Get With You" contains excerpts from "Much Too Much" as written by Marcus Miller.

== Charts ==
=== Weekly charts ===
Weekly chart performance for J.E. Heartbreak
Chart (1999–2000)	Peak position
UK R&B Albums (Official Charts)	21
US Billboard 200	8
US Top R&B/Hip-Hop Albums (Billboard)	1

=== Year-end charts ===
2000 year-end chart performance for J.E. Heartbreak
Chart (2000)	Position
US Billboard 200	56
US Top R&B/Hip-Hop Albums (Billboard)	10

2001 year-end chart performance for J.E. Heartbreak
Chart (2001)	Position
US Billboard 200	169
US Top R&B/Hip-Hop Albums (Billboard)	75

== Certifications ==
Certifications for J.E. Heartbreak
Region	Certification	Certified units/sales
United Kingdom (BPI)	Silver	60,000^{*}
United States (RIAA)	2× Platinum	2,000,000^{^}
^{*} Sales figures based on certification alone.^{^} Shipments figures based on certification alone.
