= Let's Get Married (Jagged Edge song) =

2000 single by Jagged Edge

Single by Jagged Edge

from the album J.E. Heartbreak
- Released: April 11, 2000
- Length: 4:23
- Label: So So Def; Columbia
- Songwriters: Brian Casey; Brandon Casey; Jermaine Mauldin; Bryan-Michael Cox
- Producers: Jermaine Dupri; Bryan-Michael Cox

Jagged Edge singles chronology
"He Can't Love U" (1999)	"Let's Get Married" (2000)	"Promise" (2000)

"Let's Get Married" is a song by American R&B group Jagged Edge from their second studio album, J.E. Heartbreak (1999). Released on April 11, 2000, the song spent three weeks atop the US Billboard Hot R&B/Hip-Hop Singles & Tracks chart in 2000 and reached number 11 on the Billboard Hot 100. In 2001, the song was issued in Australia as a double A-side with "Promise" and reached number two on the Australian Singles Chart. The music video features Fredro Starr and Kent Masters-King as the fictional couple deciding on whether they should get married or not.

The song's official remix features DJ Run of Run-D.M.C. and samples the group's debut single "It's Like That". The official video for the remix was directed by Tim Story and Bryan Barber. The group performed the single at the kayfabe wedding of Theodore Long and Kristal Marshall on the September 21, 2007, episode of WWE Friday Night SmackDown. Another "Reception" remix was produced by Kanye West and samples Hall & Oates' song "Grounds for Separation".

== Track listings ==
US maxi-CD single

1. "Let's Get Married" (album version) – 4:23
2. "Let's Get Married" (Reception remix) – 3:50
3. "Let's Get Married" (Remarqable remix featuring Run) – 4:09
4. "Let's Get Married" (Metromix radio remix) – 3:31
5. "Let's Get Married" (Metromix club remix) – 7:38
6. "Let's Get Married" (Metromix dub) – 7:38

European CD single

1. "Let's Get Married" (album version) – 4:23
2. "Let's Get Married" (Remarqable remix featuring Run) – 4:09

Australian CD single

1. "Let's Get Married" (Remarqable remix featuring Run)
2. "Promise" (Cool JD remix featuring Loon)
3. "Let's Get Married"
4. "Promise"
5. "Promise" (Speakeasy extended remix)

== Charts ==
=== Weekly charts ===
Chart (2000–2001)	Peak position
Australia (ARIA) with "Promise"	2
Australian Urban (ARIA)	1
Canada (Nielsen SoundScan)	10
Germany (GfK)	61
US Billboard Hot 100	11
US Dance Singles Sales (Billboard)	1
US Hot R&B/Hip-Hop Songs (Billboard)	1
US Rhythmic Airplay (Billboard)	16

=== Year-end-charts ===
Chart (2000)	Position
US Billboard Hot 100	46
US Hot R&B/Hip-Hop Singles & Tracks (Billboard)	1
US Maxi-Singles Sales (Billboard)	5
US Rhythmic Top 40 (Billboard)	44

Chart (2001)	Position
Australia (ARIA)	19
Australian Urban (ARIA)	8
Canada (Nielsen SoundScan)	39

== Certifications ==
Certifications for "Let's Get Married"
Region	Certification	Certified units/sales
Australia (ARIA) for remix version	2× Platinum	140,000^{^}
Denmark (IFPI Danmark)	Gold	4,000^{^}
New Zealand (RMNZ)	Gold	15,000^{‡}
United Kingdom (BPI) for remix version	Silver	200,000^{‡}
^{^} Shipments figures based on certification alone.^{‡} Sales+streaming figures based on certification alone.
