= 1987 Soul Train Music Awards =

Music awards ceremony in Los Angeles, US

Soul Train Music Awards
- Date: March 23, 1987
- Location: Santa Monica Civic Auditorium (Los Angeles, California)
- Country: United States
- Hosted by: Dionne Warwick and Luther Vandross
- First award: 1987

Highlights
- Most awards: Janet Jackson, Cameo and Run–D.M.C. (2)
- Website: soultrain.com

Television/radio coverage
- Network: WGN America

The 1987 Soul Train Music Awards aired live on March 23, 1987 (and was later syndicated in other areas), honoring the best in R&B, soul, rap, jazz, and gospel music from the previous year. The show was held at the Santa Monica Civic Auditorium in Los Angeles, California and was hosted by Luther Vandross and Dionne Warwick.

== Special award ==
=== Heritage Award for Career Achievement ===
- Stevie Wonder

== Winners and nominees ==
Winners are in bold text.

=== Album of the Year – Male ===
- **Luther Vandross – Give Me the Reason**
  - Freddie Jackson – Rock Me Tonight
  - Billy Ocean – Love Zone
  - Stevie Wonder – In Square Circle

=== Album of the Year – Female ===
- **Janet Jackson – Control**
  - Anita Baker – Rapture
  - Whitney Houston – Whitney Houston
  - Patti LaBelle – Winner in You

=== Album of the Year – Group, Duo, or Band ===
- **Cameo – Word Up!**
  - Atlantic Starr – As the Band Turns
  - Kool & the Gang – Forever
  - Run–D.M.C. – Raising Hell

=== Best Single – Male ===
- **Gregory Abbott – "Shake You Down"**
  - Freddie Jackson – "Tasty Love"
  - Prince – "Kiss"
  - Luther Vandross – "Give Me the Reason"

=== Best Single – Female ===
- **Anita Baker – "Sweet Love"**
  - Whitney Houston – "The Greatest Love of All"
  - Janet Jackson – "What Have You Done for Me Lately"
  - Meli'sa Morgan – "Do Me Baby"

=== Best Single – Group, Duo, or Band ===
- **Cameo – "Word Up"**
  - Atlantic Starr – "Secret Lovers"
  - Timex Social Club – "Rumors"
  - Dionne Warrick and Friends – "That's What Friends Are For"

=== Best Rap Single ===
- **Run–D.M.C. – "Walk This Way"**
  - Joeski Love – "Peewee's Dance"
  - Timex Social Club – "Rumors"
  - Whodini – "One Love"

=== Best Music Video ===
- **Janet Jackson – "What Have You Done for Me Lately"**
  - Anita Baker – "Sweet Love"
  - Cameo – "Word Up"
  - Peter Gabriel – "Sledgehammer"

=== Best New Artist ===
- **Gregory Abbott**
  - Club Nouveau
  - The Jets
  - Shirley Murdock

=== Best Rap Album ===
- **Run–D.M.C. – Raising Hell**
  - Fat Boys – Fat Boys Are Back
  - LL Cool J – Radio
  - Whodini – Back in Black

=== Best Gospel Album – Solo ===
- **Al Green – He Is the Light**
  - Shirley Caesar – Celebration
  - Andraé Crouch – Autograph
  - Tramaine – The Search Is Over

=== Best Gospel Album – Group, Duo, or Choir ===
- **The Winans – Let My People Go**
  - Aretha Franklin with James Cleveland and the Southern California Community Choir – Amazing Grace
  - Various Artists – The Color Purple Original Motion Picture Soundtrack
  - The Williams Brothers – Blessed

=== Best Jazz Album – Solo ===
- **George Howard – Love Will Follow**
  - Miles Davis – Tutu
  - Kenny G – Duotones
  - Sade – Promise

=== Best Jazz Album – Group, Duo, or Band ===
- **Bob James and David Sanborn – Double Vision**
  - Spyro Gyra – Breakout
  - Hiroshima – Another Place
  - The Yellowjackets – Shades

== Performers ==
- Cameo – "Word Up!"
- LL Cool J – "I'm Bad"
- Al Jarreau
- Run–D.M.C. and Aerosmith – "Walk This Way"
- Whitney Houston – "You Give Good Love"
- George Benson
- Luther Vandross – "So Amazing"
- Bob James
- Stevie Wonder Tribute:
  - Dionne Warwick and Luther Vandross – "My Cherie Amour" / "All is Fair in Love" / "You Are the Sunshine of My Life" / "I Just Called to Say I Love You"
- Stevie Wonder – "I Can Only Be Me"
- David Sanborn, Bob James, George Benson, and the George Duke Jazz Orchestra – "It's You"
- Cissy Houston, Vanessa Bell Armstrong, Andrae Crouch, Sandra Crouch, Shirley Caesar, Tramaine Hawkins, Edwin Hawkins, The Williams Brothers and The Winans – "Mary Don't You Weep"
- Carlos Vega
- George Duke
- Luther Vandross, Whitney Houston, Dionne Warwick and Stevie Wonder – "That's What Friends Are For"
