= So So Def Recordings =

US record label

- Parent company: Sony Music Entertainment (1993–2002; back catalogue); Bertelsmann Music Group (2003–2005); EMI (2005–2006); Universal Music Group (2007–2009); Hybe America (2025–present)
- Founded: 1993; 33 years ago
- Founder: Jermaine Dupri
- Distributors: Columbia (1993–2002); Arista (2003–2005); Virgin America (2005—2006); Island Def Jam (2007–2009); J (2009–2011); RCA (2011–2016); Epic (2016–2023); Create Music Group (2024–2025); Hybe America (HYBE) (2025–present)
- Genre: Hip hop; R&B
- Country of origin: United States
- Location: Atlanta, Georgia, U.S.

So So Def Recordings is an American record label based in Atlanta, Georgia, founded by producer Jermaine Dupri in 1993. Specializing in Southern hip hop, R&B, and bass music, the label has signed musical acts such as Bow Wow, Kris Kross, Xscape, Dem Franchize Boyz, Anthony Hamilton, Jagged Edge, INOJ, J-Kwon, and the Ghost Town DJ's. Lathun Grady, The ROC

== History ==
So So Def was established in 1993 as a spin-off of Dupri's production company of the same moniker, through a joint venture with Sony and Columbia. Its first act was Xscape, whose debut album was released in the fall of the same year and went Platinum—as did their 2nd and 3rd albums, released in 1995 and 1998. In 1994, the label released the debut album of Da Brat, who became the 1st solo female emcee to be certified for Platinum album sales. In 1996, Kandi Burruss brought Jagged Edge to the attention of the label; their debut album, A Jagged Era, was released in 1997. So So Def later released the triple platinum debut album by Lil' Bow Wow in 2000. Other acts on the label have included: Dem Franchise Boyz, The Ghost Town DJs, INOJ, J-Kwon, Trina Broussard, 3LW, and Anthony Hamilton.

=== 1993–2002: Columbia, Xscape, Da Brat, Lil Bow Wow ===
So So Def closed out 2001 with the December 18 release of Lil' Bow Wow's second studio album, Doggy Bag. The album featured guest appearances from several labelmates, including R.O.C., Fundisha, Xscape, Da Brat, and Jagged Edge. Production was primarily handled by Jermaine Dupri and Bryan-Michael Cox, with Dupri also serving as executive producer. Commercially, Doggy Bag proved to be another major success for the young rapper, debuting at No. 11 on the Billboard 200 after selling approximately 319,000 copies in its first week. The album was subsequently certified platinum by the Recording Industry Association of America (RIAA). It would ultimately mark Bow Wow's final studio album released under the So So Def label.

=== 2005–2006: Virgin and Dem Franchize Boyz era ===
On January 24, 2005, Jermaine Dupri was appointed president of Virgin Records America's newly established Urban Music division. Under the agreement, So So Def joined Virgin's roster, while Dupri also signed as a solo artist and agreed to produce artists on Virgin and other EMI labels. Later that year, Dupri signed Atlanta, Georgia-based rap group Dem Franchize Boyz to the label.

So So Def kicked off 2006 with the February release of Dem Franchize Boyz's On Top of Our Game, their second studio album and only full-length studio release under the label. Production was primarily handled by Jermaine Dupri, who also served as executive producer. Guest appearances from So So Def labelmates included Dupri, Da Brat, and Bow Wow. The album achieved considerable commercial success, debuting and peaking at No. 5 on the Billboard 200 and quickly earning a gold certification from the RIAA. Later that October, Dupri resigned from his position as president of Virgin Records' Urban Music division, taking So So Def with him as he departed the company. However, this move resulted in the loss of Dem Franchize Boyz.

== Distribution ==
In late 2002, So So Def's distribution deal with Columbia ended. The following year, Dupri moved So So Def to Arista. While many of So So Def's acts moved with the label to Arista, Bow Wow and Jagged Edge were forced to remain at Columbia, due to their contracts having been with that company primarily. In 2004, per the re-consolidation of labels caused by the merger of its former Sony parent and BMG, So So Def was shifted from Arista to Zomba.

In 2005, Dupri was appointed Executive Vice President of Urban Music at Virgin, causing So So Def to move again, this time over to Virgin and EMI—resulting in the loss of Bone Crusher and YoungBloodZ. So So Def, meanwhile, was able to retain J-Kwon and Anthony Hamilton, despite them still being signed to Zomba. In 2006, Dupri had a falling-out with Virgin, resulting in him leaving his post at the company. Intermittent, he was appointed President of urban music at Universal's Island, resulting in So So Def once again making a move to UMG's The Island Def Jam.

In 2009, it was reported that Dupri had been terminated from his post at Island. Later in the same year, it was rumored that So So Def had moved back to Sony, where it reportedly operated under Zomba once more. In 2010, Mississippi-based independent label Malaco Records distributed So So Def's release of the Why Did I Get Married Too? soundtrack.

In 2014, So So Def partnered with Primary Wave for the release of Jagged Edge's album J.E. Heartbreak 2. In June 2016, So So Def partnered with Epic for current distribution. In 2024, Dupri signed a multi-year distribution deal with Create Music Group for the So So Def label.

In April 2025, So So Def signed a distribution deal with Hybe America, reuniting Dupri and Hybe America CEO Scooter Braun, who began his music career working for So So Def. On June 2, 2025, Dupri announced the signing of R&B duo Dvsn, the first artists signed to So So Def and Hybe America under the venture.

== Discography ==
Year	Title	Artist	Certification
1993	Hummin' Comin' at 'Cha	Xscape	RIAA: Platinum
1994	Funkdafied	Da Brat	RIAA: Platinum
1995	Off the Hook	Xscape	RIAA: Platinum
1996	Anuthatantrum	Da Brat	RIAA: Gold
1996	Young, Rich & Dangerous	Kris Kross	RIAA: Gold
1997	A Jagged Era	Jagged Edge	RIAA: Gold
1998	Traces of My Lipstick	Xscape	RIAA: Platinum
1998	Life in 1472	Jermaine Dupri	RIAA: Platinum
1998	12 Soulful Nights of Christmas	Various artists	–
1999	The Movement	Harlem World	–
1999	J.E. Heartbreak	Jagged Edge	RIAA: 2× Platinum
2000	Unrestricted	Da Brat	RIAA: Platinum
2000	Beware of Dog	Lil' Bow Wow	RIAA: 2× Platinum
2001	Jagged Little Thrill	Jagged Edge	RIAA: Platinum
2001	Instructions	Jermaine Dupri	–
2001	Doggy Bag	Lil' Bow Wow	RIAA: Platinum
2002	So So Def Presents: Definition Of A Remix	Jermaine Dupri / Various	–
2003	Drankin' Patnaz	YoungBloodZ	RIAA: Gold
2003	AttenCHUN!	BoneCrusher	–
2003	Comin' From Where I'm From	Anthony Hamilton	RIAA: Platinum
2003	Limelite, Luv & Niteclubz	Da Brat	–
2003	Hard	Jagged Edge	RIAA: Gold
2004	Hood Hop	J-Kwon	RIAA: Gold
2005	Ain't Nobody Worryin'	Anthony Hamilton	RIAA: Gold
2005	Young, Fly & Flashy, Vol. 1	Jermaine Dupri	–
2006	On Top of Our Game	Dem Franchize Boyz	RIAA: Gold
2006	Point of No Return	3LW	–
2006	So So Gangsta	Daz Dillinger	–
2007	Money Power and Techs	Hot Dollar	–
2007	Baby Makin' Project	Jagged Edge	–
2008	Self-Made	Rocko	–
2008	100 Laws Of Power 2.0	Hot Dollar	–
2014	J.E. Heartbreak 2	Jagged Edge	–
2018	The Return	Da Brat	–
2018	So So Def 25th Anniversary (1993-2018)	Jermaine Dupri / Various	–

== Artists ==
- Kris Kross
- Trina Broussard
- Xscape
- Monica (management only)
- Bow Wow
- Whodini
- Dem Franchize Boyz
- Harlem World
- Ghost Town DJ's
- TLC (management only)
- YoungBloodZ
- Bone Crusher
- Anthony Hamilton
- Daz Dillinger
- 3LW
- Rocko
- DJ Felli Fel
- Hot Dollar
- Johntá Austin
- Leah Labelle (deceased)
- R.O.C.
- Jagged Edge
- J-Kwon
- dvsn
