= Anthony Hamilton discography =

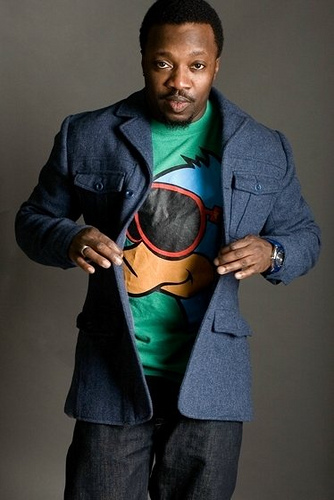
Hamilton in 2007

This is the discography for American R&B musician Anthony Hamilton.

== Albums ==
=== Studio albums ===
Title	Details	Peak chart positions				Certifications
Title	Details	US	US R&B /HH	NED	UK R&B	Certifications
Comin' from Where I'm From	Released: September 23, 2003; Label: So So Def, Arista; Formats: CD, digital download	33	6	—	—	RIAA: Platinum
Ain't Nobody Worryin'	Released: December 13, 2005; Label: So So Def, Zomba; Formats: CD, digital download	19	4	—	—	RIAA: Gold
The Point of It All	Released: December 16, 2008; Label: So So Def, Zomba; Formats: CD, digital download	12	3	—	—	RIAA: Gold
Back to Love	Released: December 13, 2011; Label: RCA; Formats: CD, digital download	12	3	43	38	RIAA: Gold
What I'm Feelin'	Released: March 25, 2016; Label: RCA; Formats: CD, digital download	15	2	—	—	
Love is the New Black	Released: September 24, 2021; Label: My Music Box, BMG; Formats: CD, digital download	—	—	—	—	
Pages (with Omari Hardwick)	Released: August 28, 2025; Label: My Music Box, BMG; Formats: Digital download	—	—	—	—	
"—" denotes a recording that did not chart or was not released in that territory.

=== Christmas albums ===
Title	Details	Peak chart positions	
Title	Details	US	US Hol
Home for the Holidays	Released: October 21, 2014; Label: RCA; Formats: CD, digital download	80	6

=== Unreleased albums ===
Title	Details
XTC	Released: 1996 (scheduled); Label: MCA; Formats: CD Promo, CS Promo

=== Compilation albums ===
Title	Details	Peak chart positions	
Title	Details	US	US R&B /HH
Soulife	Released: June 20, 2005; Label: Atlantic; Formats: CD, LP	12	4
Southern Comfort	Released: April 3, 2007; Label: Merovingian Music; Formats: CD	90	13

== Singles ==
=== As lead artist ===
Year	Single	Chart positions					Certifications	Album
Year	Single	US	US R&B /HH	AUT	FR	SUI	Certifications	Album
1996	"Nobody Else"	—	63	—	—	—		XTC
2003	"Comin' from Where I'm From"	—	60	—	—	—	RIAA: Gold	Comin' from Where I'm From
2004	"Charlene"	19	3	—	—	—	RIAA: 2× Platinum	Comin' from Where I'm From
2005	"Can't Let Go"	71	13	—	—	—	RIAA: Platinum	Ain't Nobody Worryin'
2006	"Sista Big Bones"	—	51	—	—	—		Ain't Nobody Worryin'
2007	"Struggle No More (The Main Event)" (featuring Jaheim and Musiq Soulchild)	—	32	—	—	—		Daddy's Little Girls soundtrack
2007	"Do You Feel Me"	—	61	—	—	—		American Gangster soundtrack
2008	"Cool" (featuring David Banner)	79	19	—	—	—	RIAA: Platinum	The Point of It All
2009	"The Point of It All"	—	19	—	—	—	RIAA: Platinum	The Point of It All
2011	"Woo"	—	24	—	—	—	RIAA: Gold	Back to Love
2011	"I'll Wait (To Fall In Love)"	—	77	—	—	—		Back to Love
2012	"Pray for Me"	122	21	—	—	—		Back to Love
2013	"Best of Me"	—	—	—	—	—	RIAA: Platinum	Back to Love
2013	"Freedom" (with Elayna Boynton)	—	—	46	28	32		Django Unchained soundtrack
2016	"Amen"	—	—	—	—	—		What I'm Feelin'
2016	"What I'm Feelin'" (featuring The HamilTones)	—	—	—	—	—		What I'm Feelin'
2020	"Mercy" (featuring Tamika Mallory)	—	—	—	—	—		Love is the New Black
2021	"You Made a Fool of Me"	—	—	—	—	—		Love is the New Black
2024	"Queen"	—	—	—	—	—		

=== As featured artist ===
Year	Single	Chart positions		Album
Year	Single	US	US R&B /HH	Album
2002	"Thugz Mansion" (2Pac featuring Anthony Hamilton)	—	111	Better Dayz
2002	"Po' Folks" (Nappy Roots featuring Anthony Hamilton)	21	13	Watermelon, Chicken & Gritz
2003	"Sunshine" (Twista featuring Anthony Hamilton)	—	—	Kamikaze
2004	"Stay for a While" (Angie Stone featuring Anthony Hamilton)	—	70	Stone Love
2004	"Why" (Jadakiss featuring Anthony Hamilton)	11	4	Kiss of Death
2005	"Can I Live?" (Nick Cannon featuring Anthony Hamilton)	—	—	Non-album single
2006	"Hustler's Dream" (The Game featuring Anthony Hamilton)	—	—	(unreleased)
2007	"I'm Not Perfect" (J. Moss featuring Anthony Hamilton)	—	111	V2... The J. Moss Project
2008	"Down N' Out" (Nappy Roots featuring Anthony Hamilton)	—	91	The Humdinger
2011	"So In Love" (Jill Scott featuring Anthony Hamilton)	97	10	The Light of the Sun
2026	"I'm Good" (Shaggy featuring Anthony Hamilton)	—	—	Lottery

=== Other certified songs ===
Year	Single	Certifications	Album
2003	"I'm a Mess"	RIAA: Gold	Comin' from Where I'm From
2008	"Her Heart"	RIAA: Gold	The Point of It All

=== Other contributions ===
Year	Song	Artist	Album
1994	"Flipped It"	Kirk	Makin' Moves
1995	"Wherever You Are" "I Will Go"	Anthony Hamilton	— New York Undercover
1997	"Pay Attention"	Cru	Da Dirty 30
1997	"Things We Be Doin' for Money, Pt. 2"	Busta Rhymes	When Disaster Strikes
1998	"Hold Your Head Up"	Heltah Skeltah	Magnum Force
1999	"On Da Grind"	JT Money	Pimpin' on Wax
2001	"Last Night"	Sunshine Anderson	Your Woman
2002	"The Gambler"	Xzibit	Man vs. Machine
2002	"Twisted"	Santana	All That I Am
2002	"Thugz Mansion" (7 Remix)	2Pac	Better Dayz
2002	"Ryde Away"	Eve	Eve-Olution
2003	"I Was the One"	Da Brat	Limelite, Luv & Niteclubz
2003	"Can I Live"	Nick Cannon	Nick Cannon
2003	"Bluegrass Stain'd"	Mark Ronson	Here Comes the Fuzz
2003	"'Bout to Get Ugly"	Mark Ronson	Here Comes the Fuzz
2003	"Push On"	Nappy Roots	Wooden Leather
2003	"Sick and Tired"	Nappy Roots	Wooden Leather
2003	"Kwah/Home"	The RH Factor	Hard Groove
2004	"Make It Home"	Spitfiya	BarberShop 2: Back in Business soundtrack
2004	"Ghetto Show"	Talib Kweli	The Beautiful Struggle
2005	"Around the World"	Lina	The Inner Beauty Movement
2005	"Long Time"	Ying Yang Twins	U.S.A. (United State of Atlanta)
2005	"Nobody Knows"	Nelly	Suit
2005	"Sunshine to the Rain"	Miri Ben-Ari	The Hip-Hop Violinist
2005	"She Was Just a Friend"	Miri Ben-Ari	The Hip-Hop Violinist
2005	"Lay Lady Lay"	Buddy Guy	Bring 'Em In
2005	"Carolina Pride"	Nomb	Smoke in the City
2005	"Can I Live"	Nick Cannon	Stages
2005	"More"	Syleena Johnson	Chapter 3: The Flesh
2005	"Some Kind of Wonderful"	Anthony Hamilton	In the Mix Soundtrack
2005	"Since I Seen U"	3160011	Sex, Money, and Clubs
2005	"Bad On You"	Sy Smith	The Syberspace Social
2006	"Dear Life"	Anthony Hamilton	Step Up (Original Soundtrack)
2006	"Hustler's Dream"	The Game	Doctor's Advocate (unreleased track)
2006	"Let's Ride"	Young Buck	Welcome To The Traphouse
2006	"Dear Mama" (Frank Nitty Remix)	2pac	Pac's Life
2006	"Since I Seen't U (Be Wit You)"	Splitzide	2 Sides of the Story
2007	"Losing You"	Keyshia Cole	Just Like You
2007	"Nowhere Fast"	Josh Turner	Everything Is Fine
2007	"How We Feel"	Chingy	Hate It or Love It
2007	"The Cleanse"	The Bottom Dwellerz	Cracks of the Concrete
2007	"Silent Night"	Boney James	This Christmas Soundtrack
2008	"Baby Boy, Baby Girl"	Mint Condition	E-Life
2008	"Silence Kills"	Tarsha' McMillian Hamilton	The McMillian Story
2008	"Lay It Down"	Al Green	Lay It Down
2008	"You've Got the Love I Need"	Al Green	Lay It Down
2008	"Everything"	Young Jeezy	The Recession
2008	"Home"	John Rich	Randy Jackson's Music Club, Vol. 1
2012	"Porchlight"	Big K.R.I.T.	Live from the Underground
2012	"World's An Addiction"	Nas	Life Is Good
2012	"Bleed The Same Blood"	Busta Rhymes, Maino	Year of the Dragon
2012	"Freedom"	Anthony Hamilton & Elayna Boynton	Django Unchained: Original Soundtrack
2013	"The Come Up"	Ace Hood	Trials & Tribulations
2013	"Never Surrender"	DJ Khaled	Suffering from Success
2014	"Water (Remix)"	Lil Bibby, Jadakiss	Free Crack 2
2015	"That One"	Teedra Moses	Cognac & Conversation
2015	"Icon"	Rick Ross	Black Dollar
2015	"Job"	August Alsina, Jadakiss	This Thing Called Life
2016	"Back to Sleep (Legends Remix)"	Chris Brown, Tank, R. Kelly	
2016	"Change Your Life"	Lil Duke	Uber
2017	"Carnival"	Gorillaz	Humanz
2017	"I Hope You Make It"	Boosie Badazz	Boopac
2018	"Forty Five Souls"	AWAR, Scarface	Spoils of War
2019	"My Everything"	E-40, K-Ci	Practice Makes Paper
2019	"Vuka"	Amanda Black, Soweto Gospel Choir	Power
