= Leela James discography =

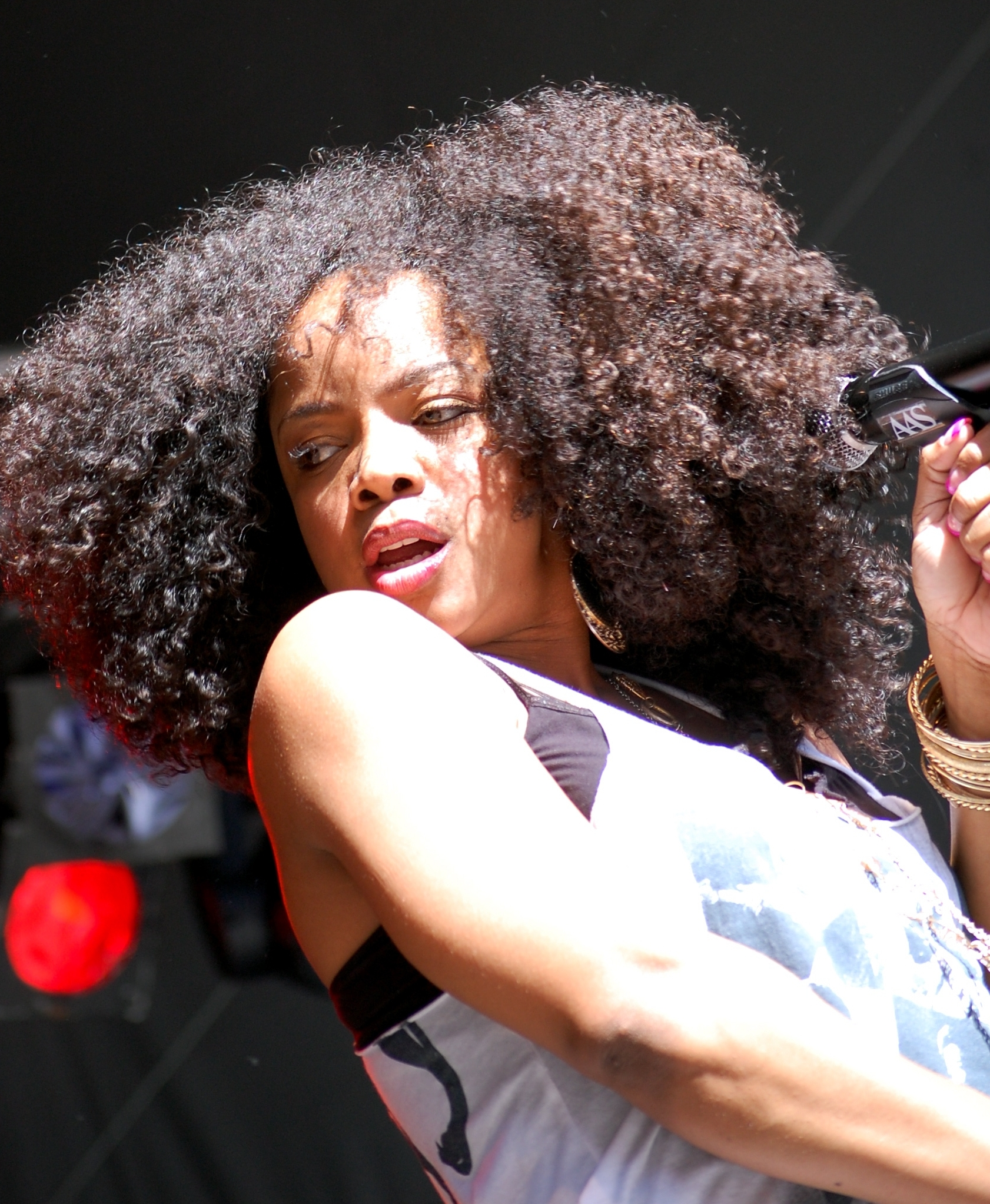
- James performing in 2009.
- Studio albums: 8
- EPs: 1

This is the discography of American R&B/soul musician Leela James.

== Studio albums ==
List of albums, with selected chart positions
Title	Album details	Peak chart positions					
Title	Album details	US	US R&B	BEL	FRA	NLD	SWE
A Change Is Gonna Come	Released: June 21, 2005; Label: Warner Bros.; Format: CD, digital download	148	42	43	97	26	52
Let's Do It Again	Released: March 24, 2009; Label: Shanachie; Format: CD, digital download	84	11	—	—	—	—
My Soul	Released: May 25, 2010; Label: Stax; Format: CD, digital download	37	7	—	—	—	—
Loving You More... In the Spirit of Etta James	Released: July 31, 2012; Label: Shanachie; Format: CD, digital download	—	44	—	—	—	—
Fall for You	Released: July 8, 2014; Label: Shesangz, BMG; Format: CD, digital download	69	12	—	—	—	—
Did It for Love	Released: March 31, 2017; Label: Shesangz, BMG; Format: CD, digital download	72	30	—	—	—	—
See Me	Released: July 30, 2021; Label: Shesangz, BMG; Format: CD, digital download	—	—	—	—	—	—
Thought U Knew	Released: October 27 2023; Label: Shesangz, BMG; Format: CD, digital download	—	—	—	—	—	—

== Extended plays ==
List of extended plays
Title	Album details
Are You Ready (with The Truth Band)	Release date: April 12, 2019; Label: 4/4 Sound, eOne; Format: CD, digital download

== Singles ==
List of singles, with selected chart positions, showing year released and album name
Title	Year	Peak chart positions			Certifications	Album
Title	Year	US R&B	US Adult R&B	US Dance	Certifications	Album
"Music"	2005	—	26	33		A Change Is Gonna Come
"Don't Speak"	2005	—	—	—		A Change Is Gonna Come
"Good Time"	2006	—	—	33		A Change Is Gonna Come
"My Joy"	2006	—	27	—		A Change Is Gonna Come
"When You Love Somebody"	2007	—	—	—		A Change Is Gonna Come
"It's a Man's Man's Man's World"	2008	—	—	—		Let's Do It Again
"Baby, I'm Scared of You"	2008	—	—	—		Let's Do It Again
"Tell Me You Love Me"	2010	72	18	—		My Soul
"So Cold"	2010	—	—	—		My Soul
"Mr. Incredible – Ms. Unforgettable" (featuring Raheem Devaughn)	2010	—	18	—		My Soul
"Something's Got a Hold on Me"	2012	—	—	—		Loving You More... In the Spirit of Etta James
"I'm Loving You More Every Day"	2012	—	—	—		Loving You More... In the Spirit of Etta James
"Say That" (featuring Anthony Hamilton)	2013	—	12	—		Fall for You
"Fall for You"	2014	—	13	—	RIAA: Gold	Fall for You
"Set Me Free"	2015	—	7	—		Fall for You
"Don't Want You Back"	2016	—	1	—		Did It for Love
"Hard for Me"	2017	—	13	—		Did It for Love
"All Over Again"	2017	—	—	—		Did It for Love
"I Remember"	2017	—	—	—		Did It for Love
"Don't Mean a Thang"	2017	—	—	—		Did It for Love
"This Is Me"	2018	—	—	—		Non-album single
"That Woman" (with The Truth Band)	2019	—	—	—		Are You Ready
"Complicated"	2021	—	1	—		See Me
"Put It on Me"	2021	—	—	—		See Me
"You're the One"	2021	—	7	—		See Me
"Reach for It"	2022	—	—	—		Non-album single
"Right Back in It"	2023	—	5	—		Thought U Knew
"Thought U Knew"	2023	—	—	—		Thought U Knew
"Whatcha Done Now"	2024	—	5	—		Thought U Knew
"Right On Time"	2025	—	10	—		2BHONEST [EP]
"Honest"	2025	—	—	—		2BHONEST [EP]
