= Southern Comfort (Anthony Hamilton album) =

Compilation album by Anthony Hamilton
- Released: April 3, 2007
- Recorded: 2000–2002
- Genre: R&B; soul; neo soul
- Length: 51:53
- Label: Merovingian
- Producer: Doug Coleman; Fanatic; Ced Solo

Anthony Hamilton chronology
Ain't Nobody Worryin' (2005)	Southern Comfort (2007)	The Point of It All (2008)

Professional ratings
Review scores
Source	Rating
About.com	2.5/5 stars
AllMusic	3/5 stars
Boston Herald	A−
Entertainment Weekly	B
Houston Press	Favorable
Okayplayer	89/100
PopMatters	6/10
Vibe	Favorable

Southern Comfort is the second compilation album by American singer Anthony Hamilton. It was released on April 3, 2007, by Merovingian Music. The album consists of previously unreleased tracks written and recorded by Hamilton between 2000 and 2002, before the release of his debut studio album, Comin' from Where I'm From—similarly to 2005's Soulife. It debuted and peaked at number 90 on the Billboard 200, while reaching number 13 on the Top R&B/Hip-Hop Albums chart and number three on the Top Independent Albums chart. It was Hamilton's first album to have a Parental Advisory label.

== Track listing ==
Writing credits adapted from BMI.

No.	Title	Writer(s)	Producer(s)	Length
1.	"They Don't Know"	Anthony Hamilton; Andreao Heard	Fanatic	4:30
2.	"Magnolia's Room"	Hamilton; Doug Coleman	Coleman	5:03
3.	"Why"	Hamilton; Pierre Moerlen	Coleman	4:25
4.	"Don't Say What You Won't Do"	Hamilton; Cedric Solomon	Ced Solo	5:55
5.	"Glad U Called"	Hamilton; Solomon	Solo	4:27
6.	"Fallin in Love Again"	Hamilton; Heard	Fanatic	4:25
7.	"Trouble"	Hamilton; Solomon	Solo	4:19
8.	"Never Give Up"	Hamilton; Solomon	Solo	4:27
9.	"Better Love"	Hamilton; Heard	Fanatic	4:44
10.	"Please"	Hamilton; Heard; Andre Harrell	Fanatic	5:41
11.	"Sailin Away"	Hamilton; Solomon	Solo	3:53

== Charts ==
Chart (2007)	Peak position
US Billboard 200	90
US Independent Albums (Billboard)	3
US Top R&B/Hip-Hop Albums (Billboard)	13

== Release history ==
Region	Date	Label	Ref.
Canada	April 3, 2007	Merovingian	
United States	April 3, 2007	Merovingian	
Germany	January 25, 2008	Groove Attack	
