= Comin' from Where I'm From (song) =

Single by Anthony Hamilton

from the album Comin' from Where I'm From
- Released: October 14, 2003
- Recorded: 2002–2003
- Studio: Allustrious Recording Studios, New York City
- Genre: R&B, soul
- Length: 4:00
- Label: So So Def, Zomba, Arista
- Songwriters: Anthony Hamilton, Mark Batson
- Producer: Mark Batson

Anthony Hamilton singles chronology
"Nobody Else" (1996)	"Comin' from Where I'm From" (2003)	"Charlene" (2004)

Music video
- "Comin' from Where I'm From" on YouTube

"Comin' from Where I'm From" is an R&B–soul song written by American singer-songwriter Anthony Hamilton and songwriter/producer Mark Batson for Hamilton's debut studio album of the same name (2003). Released as the album's lead single, it was produced by Batson. Initially, it was released as an airplay-only single, entering the Billboard Hot R&B/Hip-Hop Songs chart at number eighty-nine the week of August 16, 2003, spending twenty weeks and in the process and peaking at number sixty. In October 2003, the song was issued as a proper physical single. It was nominated for two Grammy Awards in 2004: "Best Traditional R&B Vocal Performance" and "Best R&B Song".

Anthony Hamilton teamed up with The LOX member Sheek Louch for a remix with three rapped verses from Louch. "Comin' from Where I'm From" was sampled by G-Unit for the song "Where I'm From", from their 2004 mixtape G-Unit Radio Part 5: All Eyez on Us. "Comin' from Where I'm From" was remixed by Lupe Fiasco's Mixtape Fahrenheit 1/15. "Comin' from Where I'm from" was also sampled by Akon for the song "Senegal".

Hamilton performed the song on an episode of Chappelle's Show and One on One.

This song was featured in the film Coach Carter, but not on the soundtrack to the movie. The song was also featured, along with many other of Hamilton's songs (specifically Ain't Nobody Worryin', Clearly and Pass Me Over), in the miniseries Thief

== Track listing ==
American 12" single

Side A:

1. "Comin' from Where I'm From" (Radio Mix) – 4:01
2. "Comin' from Where I'm From" (Instrumental) – 4:01

Side B:

1. "Comin' from Where I'm From" (Radio Mix) – 4:01
2. "Comin' from Where I'm From" (A cappella) – 3:37

== Charts ==
Chart (2003)	Peak position
U.S. Billboard Hot R&B/Hip-Hop Songs	64

== Certifications ==
Certifications for "Comin' from Where I'm From"
Region	Certification	Certified units/sales
United States (RIAA)	Gold	500,000^{‡}
^{‡} Sales+streaming figures based on certification alone.
