= The Avila Brothers =

American songwriting duo

- Origin: San Bernardino, California, United States
- Genres: R&B; quiet storm; new jack swing; soul
- Occupations: Singers; songwriters; record producers; multi-instrumentalists
- Years active: 1989–
- Labels: RCA; Perspective; New Prodigal Records; Benson; Flyte Tyme Records
- Members: Bobby "Ahvlah" Ross Avila; Issiah "Iz" J. Avila

The Avila Brothers, composed of Bobby "Ahvlah" Ross Avila and Issiah "Iz" J. Avila, are an American R&B producing and songwriting duo best known for their numerous contributions to Usher projects, including 2004 album Confessions. The brothers later won the Grammy Award for Best R&B Album for their contributions to Chaka Khan album Funk This.

== Career ==
=== 1989-2003: Industry beginnings ===
In 1989 at the age of 12, Bobby Ross Avila signed a record deal with RCA Records, releasing his eponymous debut solo album later that same year and achieving a minor R&B hit with "Music Man". This project was followed by mature R&B album My Destiny (1993), which paired Avila with notable R&B producers Jimmy Jam and Terry Lewis as they had recently signed Avila to their label Perspective Records. The album scored Avila his biggest single to date with Hot 100-charting "La La Love". Additional albums Que Pasa? (1994), and Into My Life (1995) would be released on other record labels, before Avila and his brother Issiah would become in-house producers and instrumentalists for Jam & Lewis' subsequent label Flyte Tyme Records. This opportunity resulted in contributions to Usher, Mya, Yolanda Adams, Gwen Stefani, Earth, Wind & Fire, and Janet Jackson projects, among others, as well as playing instruments for various songs on The Fighting Temptations (soundtrack) executive-produced by Jam & Lewis.

=== 2004-2010: Confessions, Damita Jo & Chaka Khan ===
After contributing 5 songs to Usher's diamond-certified album Confessions ("Truth Hurts", "Simple Things", "Bad Girl", "That's What It's Made For", and bonus track "Seduction") and several to Janet Jackson's 2004 studio album Damita Jo, the brothers next worked alongside Jam & Lewis, as well as notable R&B producer James "Big Jim" Wright to co-write five songs for inclusion on Chaka Khan's eleventh studio album Funk This in 2007. This included minor R&B hit "One for All Time".

=== 2011-Present: Miguel and "Glu" ===
In 2017, the duo were credited for all instrument accompaniment on "Banana Clip" from Miguel's 2017 album War & Leisure. They would later reunite with longtime Usher collaborators Lil Jon and Sean Garrett in 2023 to co-write single "Glu", which climbed to number one on the Billboard Adult R&B Airplay chart. The pair also produced "Horas Y Horas", the Spanish version of Muni Long's R&B sleeper hit "Hrs and Hrs" for an exclusive Spotify release.

== Selected songwriting and production credits ==
Credits are courtesy of Discogs, Tidal, Spotify, and AllMusic.

Title	Year	Artist	Album
"Darling Girl"	2001	Yolanda Adams	Believe
"Jesus for a Day"	2003	Macy Gray	The Trouble with Being Myself
"Anatomy 1On1"	2003	Mya	Moodring
"Late"	2003	Mya	Moodring
"Things That Lovers Do"	2003	Kenny Lattimore & Chanté Moore	Things That Lovers Do
"Loveable (From Your Head to Your Toes)" (#19 US Adult R&B)	2003	Kenny Lattimore & Chanté Moore	Things That Lovers Do
"Truth Hurts"	2004	Usher	Confessions
"Simple Things"	2004	Usher	Confessions
"Bad Girl" (#106 US R&B)	2004	Usher	Confessions
"That's What It's Made For" (#53 US R&B/Hip-Hop)	2004	Usher	Confessions
"Seduction" (#68 US R&B/Hip-Hop)	2004	Usher	Confessions
"Sweet Kind of Life"	2004	Cheryl Lynn	Shark Tale OST
"Harajuku Girls"	2004	Gwen Stefani	Love. Angel. Music. Baby.
"Damita Jo"	2004	Janet Jackson	Damita Jo
"Spending Time with You"	2004	Janet Jackson	Damita Jo
"Like You Don't Love Me"	2004	Janet Jackson	Damita Jo
"Moist"	2004	Janet Jackson	Damita Jo
"Baggage" (#104 US R&B/Hip-Hop)	2005	Mary J. Blige	The Breakthrough
"Can't Get Enough"	2005	Mary J. Blige	The Breakthrough
"4 My Man" (Featuring Fantasia)	2005	Missy Elliott	The Cookbook
"Music" (#26 US Adult R&B, #33 US Dance/Club Charts)	2005	Leela James	A Change Is Gonna Come
"Pure Gold" (#15 US Adult R&B, #23 US Adult Contemporary)	2005	Earth, Wind & Fire	Illumination
"Alwaysness"	2005	Yolanda Adams	Day by Day
"Enjoy"	2006	Janet Jackson	20 Y.O.
"Back in the Day"	2007	Chaka Khan	Funk This
"One for All Time" (#35 R&B)	2007	Chaka Khan	Funk This
"Will You Love Me?"	2007	Chaka Khan	Funk This
"Disrespectful" (Featuring Mary J. Blige) (#1 US Dance/Club Charts)	2007	Chaka Khan	Funk This
"Hail to the Wrong"	2007	Chaka Khan	Funk This
"Point Of It All" (#109 US, #19 US R&B)	2008	Anthony Hamilton	The Point of It All
"On The Hood"	2008	Sean Garrett	Turbo 919
"One Day"	2008	Sean Garrett	Turbo 919
"Beautiful U R" (#1 Dance/Club Charts, #10 CAN)	2008	Deborah Cox	The Promise
"Down 4 U"	2008	Deborah Cox	The Promise
"Monstar" (#107 US)	2010	Usher	Raymond v. Raymond
"Mars vs Venus"	2010	Usher	Raymond v. Raymond
"Pro Lover"	2010	Usher	Raymond v. Raymond
"Lingerie"	2010	Usher	Versus (EP)
"How Can You Love Me"	2010	El DeBarge	Second Chance
"Christmas Without You"	2010	El DeBarge	Second Chance
"Heart Full of Love"	2010	El DeBarge	Second Chance
"Body Police"	2010	Avant	The Letter
"I'll Wait (To Fall in Love)"	2011	Anthony Hamilton	Back to Love
"Santa Claus Goes Straight to the Ghetto"	2014	Anthony Hamilton	Home for the Holidays
"What Do the Lonely Do at Christmas"	2014	Anthony Hamilton	Home for the Holidays
"Hey Lover"	2015	Charlie Wilson	Forever Charlie
"Me and You Forever"	2015	Charlie Wilson	Forever Charlie
"Do It Yourself" (with Usher)	2021	Jam and Lewis	Jam & Lewis: Volume One
"Glu" (#1 US Adult R&B)	2023	Usher	Non-album single
"530"	2024	¥$	Vultures 2

== Awards and nominations ==
Year	Ceremony	Award	Result	Ref
2005	47th Annual Grammy Awards	Grammy Award for Album of the Year (Confessions)	Nominated	
2008	50th Annual Grammy Awards	Grammy Award for Best R&B Album (Funk This)	Won	
2024	ASCAP Rhythm & Soul Awards	Most Performed R&B/Hip-Hop Songs ("Glu")	Won	
