= Cool (Anthony Hamilton song) =

Single by Anthony Hamilton featuring David Banner

from the album The Point of It All
- Released: September 23, 2008
- Recorded: 2008
- Genre: R&B
- Length: 4:17 (album version): 3:40 (no rap version); 4:13 (instrumental version)
- Label: Sony Legacy
- Songwriters: Anthony Hamilton; Lavell Crump; Kelvin Wooten

Anthony Hamilton singles chronology
""Pass Me Over""	"Cool" (2008)	"The Point of It All" (2009)

"Cool" is the first single from Anthony Hamilton's 2008 studio album The Point of It All; rapper David Banner also performs in the song. "Cool" was composed by Anthony Hamilton, Lavell Crump, and Kelvin Wooten. The promo version and single released in mid-late September, 2008, and the music video debuted in late October, 2008. The song debuted on Billboard's music charts on March 1, 2009; it would make it to #19 on the U.S. R&B charts, and to #114 on the U.S. Billboard's Hot 100.

== Critical reception ==
The critical reception to the song has been mixed; it was not seen as one of the better tracks of the album. Mike Joseph of Pop Matters wrote "it’s far from the best song on the album (actually, it‘s one of the weakest)". However, reviews have shown favor to the song. Edward Bowser of Soul in Stereo wrote "David Banner’s disgusting rap... can’t even slow this down".

Mike Joseph also wrote “Cool” ... turns out to be a pretty decent song, a mellow midtempo track with a fairly unobtrusive (and witty) rap section from Banner. Andy Kellman of AllMusic also gave the single a favorable review saying it "parlays the stress of financial strain into a good time without resembling mindless escapism."

== Charts ==
=== Weekly charts ===
Chart (2009)	Peak position
US Hot R&B/Hip-Hop Songs (Billboard)	19

=== Year-end charts ===
Chart (2009)	Position
US Hot R&B/Hip-Hop Songs (Billboard)	40
