= Angel (Chaka Khan song) =

Single by Chaka Khan

from the album Funk This
- Released: October 25, 2007
- Studio: Flyte Tyme Studios, Santa Monica, California, U.S.
- Genre: R&B
- Length: 4:26
- Label: Sony BMG
- Songwriter: James "Big Jim" Wright; Yvette Marie Stevens
- Producers: Jimmy Jam; Terry Lewis; Tammy McCrary

Chaka Khan singles chronology
"Disrespectful" (2007)	"Angel" (2007)

"Angel" is a song recorded by the American singer Chaka Khan for her eleventh studio album, Funk This (2007). It was written by Wright James Quenton and Yvette Marie Stevens, and produced by Tammy McCrary, Jimmy Jam and Terry Lewis. The song was recorded at the Flyte Tyme Studios in Santa Monica, California, and was mixed by Jordan Young, with William "Doc" Powell playing the guitar and Luis Conte percussion.

"Angel" is a R&B ballad, which also contains elements of contemporary R&B and jazz music. Following the release of the song, "Angel" charted at number 26 on the Billboard Hot R&B/Hip-Hop Songs chart, and peaked at number 19 on the Billboard Bubbling Under Hot 100 chart.

== Lyrical interpretation ==
According to Khan, the song is about "reminding people that we are all angels in spite of our flaws and what not. And that there is hope." An accompanying music video was directed by Khan (focusing mostly on Khan recording the song in the vocal booth).

== Personnel ==
- Chaka Khan – lead vocals, backing vocals
- Bernie Grundman – mastering
- Matt Marrin – mixing and recording
- William "Doc" Powell – guitar
- Jimmy Jam – guitar
- Luis Conte – synthesizer
- Aaron Spears – drums
- Andrew Gouche – bass guitar
- James "Big Jim" Wright – keyboards

== Charts ==
Chart performance for "Angel"
Chart (2007)	Peak position
US Bubbling Under Hot 100 (Billboard)	19
US Hot R&B/Hip-Hop Songs (Billboard)	26
