= Like Sugar =

Like Sugar may refer to:

- "Like Sugar", a 2019 song by Chaka Khan from Hello Happiness
- "Like Sugar", a 2012 song by Matchbox Twenty from North
