= Tell Me You Love Me =

Tell Me You Love Me may refer to:

- Tell Me You Love Me (TV series), 2007 HBO television drama series
- Tell Me You Love Me (album), 2017 album by Demi Lovato
  - "Tell Me You Love Me" (song), 2017 song by Demi Lovato
- "Tell Me You Love Me", single from Frank Zappa album Chunga's Revenge
- "Tell Me You Love Me", song from Leela James album My Soul
- "Tell Me U Luv Me", 2020 song by Juice Wrld and Trippe Redd
