= Can't Let Go (Anthony Hamilton song) =

Single by Anthony Hamilton

from the album Ain't Nobody Worryin'
- Released: October 17, 2005
- Recorded: 2004–2005
- Genre: R&B, soul
- Length: 3:52
- Label: So So Def, Zomba, Arista
- Songwriter(s): Anthony Hamilton, Mark Batson
- Producer(s): Mark Batson

Anthony Hamilton singles chronology
"Charlene" (2004)	"Can't Let Go" (2005)	"Sista Big Bones" (2006)

"Can't Let Go" is an R&B–soul song written by American singer-songwriter Anthony Hamilton and songwriter/producer Mark Batson for Hamilton's third album, Ain't Nobody Worryin' (2005). Released in as the album's lead single in October 2005 and produced by Batson, it debuted at number seventy-six on the Hot R&B/Hip-Hop Songs the week of November 5, 2005; there, it had a whopping sixty-eight-week chart run, peaking at number thirteen. On the Billboard Hot 100, where it entered at number ninety-three the week of March 18, 2006, the stay was much more brief (nineteen weeks), as was its peak position (number seventy-one).

== Charts ==
=== Weekly charts ===
Chart (2005–2006)	Peak position
US Billboard Hot 100	71
US Hot R&B/Hip-Hop Songs (Billboard)	13

=== Year-end charts ===
Chart (2006)	Position
US Hot R&B/Hip-Hop Songs (Billboard)	14

== Certifications ==
Certifications for "Can't Let Go"
Region	Certification	Certified units/sales
United States (RIAA)	Platinum	1,000,000^{‡}
^{‡} Sales+streaming figures based on certification alone.
