= Back to Love (Anthony Hamilton album) =

Studio album by Anthony Hamilton
- Released: December 13, 2011
- Length: 46:00 (standard); 64:00 (deluxe)
- Label: RCA
- Producer: The Avila Brothers; Babyface; Mike City; Antonio Dixon; Dre & Vidal; Anthony Hamilton; Andreao Heard; Jairus Mozee; James Poyser; Salaam Remi; Christopher Soper; Jerry Wonda; Kelvin Wooten

Anthony Hamilton chronology
The Point of It All (2008)	Back to Love (2011)	Home for the Holidays (2014)

Singles from Back to Love
- 1. "Woo" Released: October 11, 2011; 2. "Pray for Me" Released: March 27, 2012; 3. "Best of Me" Released: February 4, 2013

Back to Love is the fifth studio album by American R&B singer Anthony Hamilton. It was released on December 13, 2011, by RCA Records. His first under the then newly restructured RCA label after his transition from So So Def Recordings and the Zomba Label Group, the album features writing and production from Babyface, Dre & Vidal, Kelvin Wooten, Mike City, Salaam Remi, James Poyser, Jairus Mozee, The Avila Brothers, as well as Hamilton himself. Hamilton-who co-wrote every song on the set.

The album earned largely positive reviews and debuted at number twelve on the US Billboard 200 chart, selling over 63,000 copies in the first week. Back to Love was nominated for the Grammy Award for Best R&B Album at the 55th Annual Grammy Awards. The album's lead single "Woo", was released on October 11, 2011. Follow-up single "Pray for Me" was also Grammy nominated in 2013 for Best R&B Song and reached number one on the Billboard Adult R&B Songs chart.

== Background ==
Back to Love marked Hamilton's first album under RCA Records, following his transition from So So Def Recordings and the Zomba Label Group. In search of a "brighter, more mainstream sound without compromising his gritty, soulful voice," he consulted a variety of new collaborators to work with him on the album, including Babyface and Antonio Dixon, who contributed three songs to the project, as well as producers Salaam Remi, Mike City, longtime colleague Kelvin Wooten and newcomer Jairus Mozee. In an interview with Billboard, he commented: "Having children gives you a new perspective, another burst of energy. Back to Love stems from that energy as well as from that of RCA's new team. And I'd always wanted to work with Babyface; we had a ball. Everybody is excited about taking things to the next level."

== Promotion ==
"Woo" was released by RCA Records on October 11, 2011 as the lead single from Back to Love. It reached number 24 on the US Billboard Hot R&B/Hip-Hop Songs chart, becoming the album's highest-charting song. Follow-up "Pray for Me", issued on March 27, 2012, was less successful but became Hamilton's third number-one hit on the US Adult R&B Songs chart. "Best of Me", the album's third single, was released on February 4, 2013 and peaked at number three on the US Adult R&B Songs chart.

== Critical reception ==
Professional ratings
Aggregate scores
Source	Rating
Metacritic	82/100
Review scores
Source	Rating
AllMusic	4/5 stars
About.com	3.5/5 stars
The A.V. Club	A−
Entertainment Weekly	A−
Los Angeles Times	3/4 stars
Rolling Stone	3.5/5 stars
PopMatters	6/10
Spin	8/10
Tom Hull	B+

Back to Love has received generally favorable reviews from music critics. At Metacritic, which assigns a normalized rating out of 100 to reviews from mainstream critics, the album received an average score of 82, based on seven reviews, which indicates "universal acclaim". AllMusic editor Andy Kellman found that Back to Love "is clearly viewed as a fresh start, even though it offers no more surprises than Ain't Nobody Worryin' or The Point of It All [...] That Back to Love is not a major shake-up is not a bad thing. Most of the songs are instantly ingratiating in some way, with none of the lighter, upbeat numbers the least bit out of character. There are some sad-cat moments that come very close to the standard Hamilton set." The A.V. Club critic Evan Rytlewski found that the album "isn't quite the radical makeover of some of Hamilton's more adventurous peers, it's nonetheless a sterling continuation of the singer's ever-widening palette."

Mikael Wood from Entertainment Weekly noted that Back to Love was not "as solid as any of his previous six albums, but its high points are the three tunes co-produced by Babyface." PopMatters's David Amidon found that Back to Love "might not be the sort of reward fans were hoping for after the longest period between albums Hamilton's major label career has seen, but truthfully just having Hamilton's vocals on a record makes a project enticing and this album is no different." Barry Walters from Spin called Back to Love Hamilton's "most finessed album". He felt that it "presents songwriting substance as style, and although that might not be flashy, it's mighty refreshing." Rob Tannenbaum, writing for Rolling Stone, remarked: "In spartan tracks that evoke but never imitate Al Green and Teddy Pendergrass, Hamilton whispers offers of courtly behavior he says would make Oprah jealous."

== Commercial performance ==
Back to Love debuted at number twelve on the US Billboard 200 and number three on the Top R&B/Hip-Hop Albums chart, selling over 63,000 copies in the first week. By February 2016, the album had sold 372,000 copies in the United States.

== Track listing ==
Back to Love track listing
No.	Title	Writer(s)	Producer(s)	Length
1.	"Back to Love"	Anthony Hamilton; Salaam Remi; Vincent Henry	Remi	3:20
2.	"Writing on the Wall"	Hamilton; Michael Flowers	Mike City	3:28
3.	"Woo"	Hamilton; Antonio Dixon; Brandon Coleman; Kenneth Edmonds; Patrick Smith	Babyface; Dixon	3:15
4.	"Pray for Me"	Hamilton; Dixon; Edmonds; Smith	Babyface; Dixon	4:40
5.	"Best of Me"	Hamilton; Jairus Mozee	Mozee	3:46
6.	"Never Let Go" (featuring Keri Hilson)	Hamilton; Crystal Johnson; Jerry Wonda; Abeer Shofani; Akene "The Champ" Dunkley; Arden "Keyz" Altino	Wonda; Dunkley^{[a]}; Altino^{[a]}	3:40
7.	"Mad"	Hamilton; Dixon; Edmonds; Smith	Babyface; Dixon	3:43
8.	"I'll Wait (To Fall in Love)"	Hamilton; Bobby Ross Avila; Issiah J. Avila	Avila Brothers	4:15
9.	"Sucka for You"	Hamilton; Kelvin Wooten	Wooten	4:19
10.	"Baby Girl"	Hamilton; Wooten	Wooten	3:34
11.	"Who's Loving You"	Hamilton; Andreao Heard; Mike Anzel; Victoria "Bekele" Tollossa	Heard; Anzel^{[a]}	3:47
12.	"Life Has a Way"	Hamilton; James Poyser	Poyser	4:15
Total length:				46:00

Deluxe edition (bonus tracks)
No.	Title	Writer(s)	Producer(s)	Length
13.	"Broken Man"	Hamilton; Andre Harris; Vidal Davis	Dre & Vidal	4:50
14.	"I'm Ready"	Hamilton	Hamilton	3:54
15.	"Fair in Love"	Hamilton; Christopher Soper; Jesse Singer; Nick Samuel	Soper	5:32
16.	"More Than Enough"	Hamilton; Wooten	Wooten	4:10
Total length:				64:00

Notes

- ^{^[a]} denotes co-producer(s)

== Charts ==
=== Weekly charts ===
Weekly chart performance for Back to Love
Chart (2011)	Peak position
Dutch Albums (Album Top 100)	43
South African Albums (RISA)	4
UK R&B Albums (OCC)	38
US Billboard 200	12
US Top R&B/Hip-Hop Albums (Billboard)	3

=== Year-end charts ===
2012 year-end chart performance for Back to Love
Chart (2012)	Position
US Billboard 200	112
US Top R&B/Hip-Hop Albums (Billboard)	19

2013 year-end chart performance for Back to Love
Chart (2013)	Position
US Top R&B/Hip-Hop Albums (Billboard)	99

== Certifications ==
Certifications for Back to Love
Region	Certification	Certified units/sales
United States (RIAA)	Gold	500,000^{‡}
^{‡} Sales+streaming figures based on certification alone.
