= See Me (Leela James album) =

Studio album by Leela James
- Released: July 30, 2021
- Length: 42:17
- Labels: Shesangz; BMG
- Producers: Rex Rideout; Leela James

Leela James chronology
| Did It for Love (2017) | See Me (2021) | Thought U Knew (2023) |

Singles from See Me
- 1. "Complicated" Released: February 12, 2021

See Me is the seventh studio album by American singer Leela James. It was released by Shesangz Music under exclusive license to BMG Rights Management on July 30, 2021. The album debuted and peaked at number 98 on the US Top Album Sales. Its lead single, "Complicated", became her second chart topper on the US Adult R&B Airplay chart.

== Critical reception ==
Chicago Reader editor James Porter noted that on "See Me, the production [...] might be the most experimental yet on a Leela James record." He found that "James sings against ominous guitars about the seeming impossibility of making it from day to day, with layers of overdubbed vocals crooning in assent. She never lets the production dominate, though, and remains in the center of the action at all times [...] Nearly two decades into her career, See Me shows that James is still making vital work."

== Track listing ==
Credits adapted from the liner notes of See Me.

| No. | Title | Writer(s) | Producer(s) | Length |
|---|---|---|---|---|
| 1. | "Break My Soul" (featuring Mumu Fresh) | Aaron Boyels; DeMario Bridges; Gabrielle Lynn Henry; Leela James; Julius Seals; Aaron Sledge; Ayaamii Sledge; Maimouna Youssef | Boyels; Bridges; Seals; Aaron Sledge | 4:13 |
| 2. | "Complicated" | Darrell Crooks; Ronnie Jackson; James; Francesca Richard; Rex Rideout | Rideout | 4:04 |
| 3. | "You're the One" | Reynaldo Reagan; Richard; Rideout | Reagan; Rideout | 3:34 |
| 4. | "Sippin'" | Charlie Bereal; James; Richard | Bereal | 4:00 |
| 5. | "I Want You" | James; Jarius Mozee; Rideout | Rideout | 4:08 |
| 6. | "See Me" | James; Richard; Rideout | Rideout | 4:10 |
| 7. | "Tryin to Get by" | David Haddon; Eric Ingram; Mozee; Richard | James; Rideout | 3:31 |
| 8. | "Put It on Me" | James; Rideout | Rideout | 3:51 |
| 9. | "Angel in Disguise" | Calvin Frazier; James; Aaron Sledge; Ayaamii Sledge | Frazier; Aaron Sledge | 3:41 |
| 10. | "So Far Away" | Mozee; Richard | Mozee | 3:24 |
| 11. | "Rise N Shine" | Phillip Jackson; James; Rideout | Rideout | 3:41 |

== Charts ==
| Chart (2021) | Peak position |
|---|---|
| UK Indie Album Breakers (OCC) | 16 |
| US Top Album Sales (Billboard) | 98 |
