= Funk This =

2007 album by Chaka Khan

Studio album by Chaka Khan
- Released: September 25, 2007
- Length: 59:07
- Label: Burgundy
- Producers: The Avila Brothers; Jimmy Jam and Terry Lewis; Jesse Johnson; Ira Schick; James "Big Jim" Wright

Chaka Khan chronology
The Platinum Collection (2006)	Funk This (2007)	Hello Happiness (2019)

Funk This is the eleventh studio album by American singer Chaka Khan. It was first released by Burgundy Records on September 25, 2007, in the United States. On October 13, 2007, the album entered at its peak position of number fifteen on the Billboard 200 and number five on the Top R&B/Hip-Hop Albums. On December 6, 2007, the album was nominated for Best R&B Album at the 2008 Grammy Awards, while "Disrespectful" was nominated for Best R&B Performance by a Duo or Group with Vocals. Both nominations resulted in wins for Khan.

The double A-side singles "Disrespectful" (featuring Mary J. Blige) and "Angel" were released to radio and made digitally available on iTunes in advance of the album release. Following the success of the initial double A-side single, the duet with Michael McDonald, "You Belong to Me", was released to radio, eventually peaking at number eighteen on the Hot Contemporary Jazz Songs chart. The contemporary R&B ballad "One for All Time" reached number fifty-five on the Hot R&B/Hip-Hop Songs.

== Critical reception ==
Professional ratings
Review scores
Source	Rating
About.com	4/5 stars
AllMusic	3/5 stars
Rolling Stone	3/5 stars

Robert Christgau rated the album three out of five stars in his review for Rolling Stone. He found that "Khan has never bothered with great albums because she has such a great voice – juicy, airy, spunky, transported. Though she's fifty-four, it's also unfrayed, one reason this committed if never classic comeback makes its mark. Another is hot-no-more producers Jimmy Jam and Terry Lewis, who add bite while discreetly leaving the songwriting to the likes of Hendrix, Prince, Sly Stone and the indelible Ed Townsend. Respect as well to Mary J. Blige's New York raspberry."

AllMusic editor Andy Kellman felt that Funk This "sounds like much of it was recorded live, giving it a loose, not-fussed-over sound, though there are some questionable moves. [...] The covers do work more often than not, highlighted by Prince's 'Sign 'O' the Times' and Joni Mitchell's 'Ladies Man' (an unlikely but very smart choice). [...] Chaka sounds mostly excellent from track to track, especially during the more relaxed moments."

== Commercial performance ==
Funk This debuted and peaked at number 15 on the US Billboard 200 in the week of October 4, 2007, selling 39,000 in its first week of release. The album became Khan's highest-charting album since I Feel for You (1984). It also reached number five on Billboard's Top R&B/Hip-Hop Albums chart. By February 2008, Funk This had sold 160,000 copies in the United States, according to Nielsen SoundScan.

== Track listing ==
Funk This track listing
No.	Title	Writer(s)	Producer(s)	Length
1.	"Back in the Day"	Chaka Khan; Bobby Ross Avila; Iz Avila; James "Big Jim" Wright; James Harris III; Terry Lewis, Tony Maiden	Jimmy Jam & Terry Lewis; Wright; The Avila Brothers^{[a]}	4:30
2.	"Foolish Fool"	Ed Townsend	Jam; Lewis; Wright; I. Avila^{[a]}	3:47
3.	"One for All Time"	Khan; B. Avila; Wright; Harris; Lewis; Johny Najera	Jam; Lewis; Wright	4:45
4.	"Angel"	Khan; Wright	Jam; Lewis; Wright	4:27
5.	"Will You Love Me?"	Khan; B. Avila; I. Avila; Harris; Lewis; Doug Rasheed	Jam; Lewis; The Avila Brothers^{[a]}	4:59
6.	"Castles Made of Sand"	Jimi Hendrix	Jam; Lewis; Jesse Johnson	4:01
7.	"Disrespectful" (featuring Mary J. Blige)	Khan; B. Avila; I. Avila; Harris; Lewis; Blige; Dave Young	Jam; Lewis; The Avila Brothers^{[a]}	4:46
8.	"Sign 'O' the Times"	Prince	Jam; Lewis; The Avila Brothers^{[a]}	5:24
9.	"Pack'd My Bags"/"You Got the Love" (featuring Tony Maiden)	Khan; Maiden; Ray Parker Jr.	Jam; Lewis	5:55
10.	"Ladies' Man"	Joni Mitchell	Jam; Lewis; Wright	3:52
11.	"You Belong to Me" (featuring Michael McDonald)	Carly Simon; McDonald	Jam; Lewis; Wright; The Avila Brothers^{[a]}	3:59
12.	"Hail to the Wrong"	Khan; B. Avila; I. Avila; Wright; Harris; Lewis	Jam; Lewis; Wright; The Avila Brothers^{[a]}	3:43
13.	"Super Life"	Khan; Ricardo Rouse	Jam; Lewis	5:03
Total length:				59:07

Circuit City/Napster bonus track
No.	Title	Writer(s)	Producer(s)	Length
14.	"Let Go"	Gary Brown; Ira Schick	Schick	3:30

iTunes bonus track
No.	Title	Writer(s)	Producer(s)	Length
14.	"Angel" (Mr. Mig Radio Remix)	Khan; Wright	Jam; Lewis; Wright; Mr. Mig^{[b]}	4:17

Walmart bonus tracks
No.	Title	Writer(s)	Producer(s)	Length
14.	"Once You Get Started" (featuring Tony Maiden)	Gavin Christopher	Jam; Lewis	3:15
15.	"Shining Star"	Maurice White; Larry Dunn; Philip Bailey	Schick	4:04

Notes

- ^{^[a]} signifies co-producer(s)
- ^{^[b]} signifies remix co-producer(s)

== Singles ==
- "Disrespectful" (featuring Mary J. Blige) (2007) – No. 1 US Dance
- "Angel" (2007) – No. 29 US R&B
- "You Belong to Me" (featuring Michael McDonald) (2007) – No. 18 US Hot Contemporary Jazz Songs
- "One for All Time" (2008) – No. 35 US R&B
- "Disrespectful" (featuring Mary J. Blige) (2009) – No. 1 UK Music Week Commercial Pop

== Charts ==
=== Weekly charts ===
Weekly chart performance for Funk This
Chart (2007)	Peak position
US Billboard 200	15
US Top R&B/Hip-Hop Albums (Billboard)	5

=== Year-end charts ===
Year-end chart performance for Funk This
Chart (2008)	Position
US Top R&B/Hip-Hop Albums (Billboard)	95
