= Glu (song) =

2023 song by Usher

Single by Usher
- Released: March 17, 2023
- Genre: R&B
- Length: 4:22
- Label: gamma.
- Songwriters: Bobby Ross Avila; Issiah J. Avila; Lil Jon; Prince; Sean Garrett; Usher
- Producers: Lil Jon; The Avila Brothers; Sean Garrett

Usher singles chronology
"Good Love" (2022)	"Glu" (2023)	"Hrs and Hrs (Remix)" (2023)

Lyric video
- "Glu" on YouTube

"Glu" is a song by American singer Usher. It was released on March 17, 2023, via the record label gamma.

== Background ==
The song samples the 1983 ballad, International Lover by Prince. After the single was first teased on Valentine's Day on February 14, 2023, Usher said: "I think it is striking conversation about R&B, striking conversation about sex, and it’s striking conversation about that connection. And I like that. It feels connected. It feels like people want it. People feel like they want to have fun."

== Music video ==
The official lyric video was released on March 17, 2023. A performance video was directed for the single by Bellamy Brewster. The official music video is yet to be released; co-starring Lori Harvey, the video is Usher's directorial debut.

== Single artwork ==
The single artwork was shot by Bellamy Brewster, featuring model Demi Marcia.

== Charts ==
Chart performance for "Glu"
Chart (2023)	Peak position
New Zealand Hot Singles (RMNZ)	35
US Hot R&B/Hip-Hop Songs (Billboard)	47
