= The Inner Beauty Movement =

Studio album by Lina
- Released: June 28, 2005 (U.S.)
- Recorded: 2004–2005
- Genre: R&B; soul; jazz; hip hop; swing
- Label: Moodstar, Hidden Beach, Epic
- Producer: Lina, Jeeve, T. House, Drew and Shannon

Lina chronology
Stranger on Earth (2001)	The Inner Beauty Movement (2005)	Morning Star (2008)

Professional ratings
Review scores
Source	Rating
Allmusic	3.5/5 stars
Okayplayer	4/5 stars

The Inner Beauty Movement is the second studio album of American R&B singer, Lina. The album was released on June 28, 2005 in US.

== Background ==
In an interview given prior to the album's release, Lina explained its concept: "The inner beauty movement is your truth. (...) My plan is to get people to realize themselves, focus on who they are and love that person".

=== Recording ===
Songs about finding someone who will never leave flow seamlessly into songs about taking control of a failed relationship and standing up for oneself. The overall theme of self-empowerment reinforces the album's title. The album's 18 tracks were chosen from nearly 40 songs, according to Hidden Beach founder and CEO Steve McKeever.

== Track listing ==
1. "My Fix"
2. "Walking (Interlude)"
3. "Hope Wish & Pray"
4. "Leaving You"
5. "Fly"
6. "Music (Interlude)"
7. "I Am"
8. "Run to Me"
9. "Around the World" (featuring Anthony Hamilton)
10. "It Could Be"
11. "Come to Mama"
12. "This Time"
13. "Never Forget (Interlude)"
14. "Smooth"
15. "Story Goes" (featuring Big Rube)
16. "Let It Go"
17. "Peace & Love"
18. "On My Own" (bonus track)
