= Sista Big Bones =

Single by Anthony Hamilton

from the album Ain't Nobody Worryin'
- Released: August 7, 2006
- Recorded: 2004–2005
- Genre: R&B, soul
- Length: 4:00
- Label: So So Def, Zomba, Arista
- Songwriters: Anthony Hamilton, Mark Batson
- Producer: Mark Batson

Anthony Hamilton singles chronology
"Can't Let Go" (2005)	"Sista Big Bones" (2006)	"Struggle No More (The Main Event)" (2007)

"Sista Big Bones" is the second and final single from Anthony Hamilton's third studio album, Ain't Nobody Worryin' (2005). As an airplay-only single, it debuted at number seventy on the Billboard Hot R&B/Hip-Hop Songs the week of August 26, 2006, spending twenty weeks and peaking at number sixty in the process. The song itself celebrates full-figured black women. The video's very own 'Sista Big Bones' was played by actress and TV personality Mo'Nique.

== Charts ==
Chart (2006)	Peak position
U.S. Billboard Hot R&B/Hip-Hop Songs	51
U.S. Billboard Hot Adult R&B Airplay	17
