= What I'm Feelin' =

Studio album by Anthony Hamilton
- Released: March 25, 2016
- Length: 47:29
- Label: RCA
- Producer: Mark Batson; James Poyser; Salaam Remi

Anthony Hamilton chronology
Home for the Holidays (2014)	What I'm Feelin' (2016)	Love is the New Black (2021)

What I'm Feelin' is the sixth studio album by American singer-songwriter Anthony Hamilton. It was released on March 25, 2016, by RCA Records.

== Critical reception ==
Professional ratings
Review scores
Source	Rating
AllMusic	4/5 stars
PopMatters	7/10

Allmusic editor Andy Kellman found that What I'm Feelin "isn't up to the level" of Hamilton's previous albums, "but its strengths are undeniable, too numerous to make the set seem like a disappointment. It starts with the clawing funk of "Save Me" (something of a full-band sequel to "Sista Big Bones"), one of those openers so effective that the temptation to hit "repeat" and skip the rest is very real. Unlike his earlier work, Hamilton here rarely dips into sorrow, instead using more of his time to express desire and gratitude. The range of backdrops is as varied as ever, from solo acoustic piano to burbling synthesizers." Associated Press critic felt that Hamilton and Batson "picked up where they left off, working perfectly together on well-crafted tracks from the upbeat "Save Me" to the smooth "Never Letting Go." Hamilton’s distinctive Southern vocals are strong throughout his 12-track offering. He candidly sings about his appreciation of loving his mate, his relationship mishaps and spiritual growth."

Colin McGuire from PopMatters called the album a "reflective record for a man much more conflicted than one might guess, What I'm Feelin' turns out to be somewhat of a fascinating listen." Renowned for Sound critic Jessica Thomas found that the album was "Anthony Hamilton in his realest form, crooning a humble collection of soulful numbers that emote straight from the heart. From delicate ballads to up-tempo grooves, his fifth studio album reminds us all of the true power of soul." In her review for NPR, Kiana Fitzgerald remarked: "The songs that are built within that framework all expand and reach out in varying emotional directions, but remain rooted in the unmistakable influence of the church [...] While Hamilton doesn't feel the need to fix what isn't broken, there are moments when he wanders, and it works."

== Commercial performance ==
What I'm Feelin' debuted at number 15 on the US Billboard 200, with first week sales of 23,000 copies. It also opened at number two on the Top R&B/Hip-Hop Albums chart, only behind K. Michelle's More Issues Than Vogue, becoming Hamilton's highest-charting album yet as well as his best ranking since his debut with Comin' from Where I'm From.

== Track listing ==
What I'm Feelin' track listing
No.	Title	Writer(s)	Producer(s)	Length
1.	"Save Me"	Anthony Hamilton; Mark Batson; Darrell Scott	Batson	3:55
2.	"Ain't No Shame"	Hamilton; Batson; Al Anderson	Batson	4:38
3.	"What I'm Feelin'" (featuring The HamilTones)	Hamilton; Batson; Harold Lilly	Batson	3:59
4.	"Amen"	Hamilton; Salaam Remi; James Poyser	Remi; Poyser	3:37
5.	"I Want You"	Hamilton; Batson	Batson	4:24
6.	"Never Letting Go"	Hamilton; Batson	Batson	3:51
7.	"Grateful"	Hamilton; Batson	Batson	4:18
8.	"Walk in My Shoes"	Hamilton; Batson	Batson	4:02
9.	"Take You Home"	Hamilton; Remi; Poyser; Ramon Montgomery	Remi; Poyser	4:54
10.	"Still"	Hamilton; Batson	Batson	3:24
11.	"Ever Seen Heaven"	Hamilton; Batson	Batson	2:48
12.	"Love Is an Angry Thing"	Hamilton; Batson	Batson	3:38
Total length:				47:29

== Charts ==
=== Weekly charts ===
Weekly chart performance for What I'm Feelin'
Chart (2016)	Peak position
Dutch Albums (Album Top 100)	105
South African Albums (RISA)	12
US Billboard 200	15
US Top R&B/Hip-Hop Albums (Billboard)	2

=== Year-end charts ===
Year-end chart performance for What I'm Feelin'
Chart (2016)	Position
US Top R&B/Hip-Hop Albums (Billboard)	35
