= Struggle No More (The Main Event) =

Single by Anthony Hamilton featuring Jaheim and Musiq Soulchild

from the album Daddy's Little Girls soundtrack
- Released: February 12, 2007
- Recorded: 2006
- Genre: R&B, soul
- Length: 3:54
- Label: Atlantic
- Songwriter(s): Herb Magwood, Wirlie Morris, Tamika Scott, Steve Sola, Christopher Terrell, Darnell Winston

Anthony Hamilton singles chronology
"Sista Big Bones" (2006)	"Struggle No More" (2007)	"Do You Feel Me" (2007)

"Struggle No More (The Main Event)" is a collaborative soundtrack single by Anthony Hamilton, Jaheim, and Musiq Soulchild. Led exclusively by airplay, it entered the Hot R&B/Hip-Hop Songs chart at number fifty-seven the week of March 3, 2007, subsequently reaching number thirty-two.

== Charts ==
Chart (2007)	Peak position
U.S. Billboard Hot R&B/Hip-Hop Songs	32
