= Fall for You (album) =

Studio album by Leela James
- Released: July 8, 2014
- Length: 37:14
- Labels: Shesangz; BMG
- Producers: Leela James (also exec.); Tim Kelley

Leela James chronology
Loving You More (2012)	Fall for You (2014)	Did It for Love (2017)

Singles from Fall for You
- 1. "Say That" Released: 2013; 2. "Fall for You" Released: 2014; 3. "Set Me Free" Released: 2014

Fall for You is the fifth studio album by American recording artist Leela James. It was released by Shesangz Music under exclusive license to BMG Rights Management on July 8, 2014 in the United States. The album debuted and peaked at number 12 on Billboard's Top R&B/Hip-Hop Albums chart and at number 69 on the Billboard 200 chart.

== Critical reception ==
Professional ratings
Review scores
Source	Rating
AllMusic	3.5/5 stars
Pop Magazine	4.5/5 stars

Allmusic editor Andy Kellman found that Fall for You offers "with an impressive synthesis of classic and contemporary sounds. The blend of styles [...] is made evident immediately, with lead song "Who's Gonna Love You More" opening with a buzzing synthesizer quickly offset by a typically gutsy and assertive vocal from James [...] While the percentage of excellent material isn't as high as it is on James' two previous albums, Fall for You is an engaging release with some pleasingly unaffected twists." L. Michael Gipson from SoulTracks praised the project as one of James' strongest albums, highlighting her powerful vocals, stronger original material, and tracks such as "Do Me Right," "So Good," and "Fall for You." Gipson noted that the album helped establish James as an artist beyond her acclaimed cover performances. Writing for Detroit Metro Times, Lee DeVito praised Fall for You for showcasing James' gritty, soulful vocals and her modern interpretation of classic soul. He highlighted the album's range, from 1990s-style R&B to piano ballads, while noting that some of the production felt overly polished and generic.

== Commercial performance ==
Fall for You reached number 69 on the US Billboard 200 and number 12 on the Top R&B/Hip-Hop Albums. It also ranked at number 97 on the year-end Top R&B/Hip-Hop Albums chart.

== Track listing ==
Credits adapted from the liner notes of Fall for You.

No.	Title	Writer(s)	Producer(s)	Length
1.	"Who's Gonna Love You More"	Drew Ramsey; Leela James; Shannon Sanders	Ramsey; Sanders	3:26
2.	"Say That" (featuring Anthony Hamilton)	Darrell Crooks; Francci Richards; James; Rex Rideout	John Dee Hammond; Rideout	3:47
3.	"Give It"	James; Michael Flowers	Mike City	3:24
4.	"Do Me Right"	Christopher Smith; James; Tim Kelley	Kelley	4:17
5.	"Set Me Free"	James; Rideout	John Dee Hammond; Rideout	3:45
6.	"Everything"	James; Cornelio "Corn" Austin	Austin	3:24
7.	"So Good"	James; Joe Ryan	Ryan	3:17
8.	"Stay with Me"	James; Lee Hutson, Jr.	JR Hutson	4:34
9.	"Fall for You"	James; Ryan; Rideout	Hammond; James	3:25
10.	"Save Me" (featuring Joe Ryan)	James; Ryan; Rideout	Ryan	3:55

== Charts ==
=== Weekly charts ===
Chart (2014)	Peak position
US Billboard 200	69
US Top R&B/Hip-Hop Albums (Billboard)	12

=== Year-end charts ===
Chart (2014)	Position
US Top R&B/Hip-Hop Albums (Billboard)	97
