= Let's Do It Again (Leela James album) =

Studio album by Leela James
- Released: March 24, 2009
- Recorded: Eastside Sound (Manhattan, New York City)
- Length: 56:03
- Label: Shanachie
- Producers: Leela James (also exec.); Randall Grass (exec.); Suzette Williams (exec.); Ralph "Buttaz" Kearns

Leela James chronology
A Change Is Gonna Come (2005)	Let's Do It Again (2009)	My Soul (2010)

Let's Do It Again is the second studio album by American soul singer-songwriter Leela James, released in the United States on March 24, 2009 by Shanachie Records. The album is a collection of cover versions of '60s, '70s, and '80s R&B songs (with the exception of The Rolling Stones' "Miss You" and Foreigner's "I Want to Know What Love Is"), and its title is a reference to the 1975 soundtrack album of the same name, whose title track, performed by The Staple Singers, is also covered on this album.

The album received generally positive reviews, with critics praising James' vocals and interpretations of classic R&B songs, particularly covers such as "It's a Man's Man's Man's World," and "Clean Up Woman." While some reviewers criticized the lack of original material and uneven song choices, Let's Do It Again improved on the chart performance of her debut album A Change Is Gonna Come (2006), reaching number 84 on the Billboard 200 and number 11 on the Top R&B/Hip-Hop Albums chart.

== Background ==
Following the release of her debut album A Change Is Gonna Come, James departed Warner Bros. Records and recorded Let's Do It Again as a tribute album featuring covers of songs by artists who influenced her, including Betty Wright, James Brown, Phyllis Hyman, and Angela Bofill. Ultimately released by Shanachie Records in 2009, the project was recorded with her touring band in a live studio setting over several days to capture the energy of her performances. James viewed the album as a bridge to her next collection of original material, using it to celebrate classic soul and introduce the music of earlier artists to a new generation.

== Critical reception ==
Professional ratings
Review scores
Source	Rating
About.com	3/5 stars
AllMusic	3.5/5 stars
PopMatters	7/10

Billboard's Gail Mitchell praised Let's Do It Again for showcasing James' "soul-steeped voice" and her fresh interpretations of classic R&B and pop songs. She highlighted standout covers such as "Baby I'm Scared of You," "I Try," and "Clean Up Woman," while noting that the album left listeners wanting to hear James return to original material. PopMatters critic Steve Horowitz praised the album for James' powerful soul vocals and her ability to bring new emotion to classic R&B songs. He highlighted standout covers such as James Brown's "It's a Man's Man's Man's World," Al Green's "Simply Beautiful," and Angela Bofill's "I Try," while noting that some song choices were less effective. SoulTracks praised Let's Do It Again for capturing James' powerful vocals and live performance energy, calling it a stronger showcase of her artistry than her debut. It also highlighted standout covers including "It's a Man's Man's Man's World," while noting that some interpretations were less effective.

AllMusic editor Andy Kellman noted that while it was disappointing that James' second album contained no original songs, the project successfully captured the loose, energetic feel of her acclaimed live performances. He praised the inspired song selections and described Let's Do It Again as one of Shanachie's strongest all-cover releases, while expressing hope that James would return to recording original material in the future. About.com's Mark Edward Nero gave the album a three-star rating, praising James' "outstanding vocals" but criticizing the album's "bland production" and uneven song quality. He noted that the all-cover album showcased James' strong performances, particularly on songs like James Brown's "It's a Man's Man's Man's World" and Betty Wright's "Clean Up Woman," but felt the project relied too heavily on nostalgia rather than new material.

== Commercial performance ==
Let's Do It Again marked an improvement in chart performance compared with James' debut album A Change Is Gonna Come (2005), reaching number 84 on the US Billboard 200, number 11 on the Top R&B/Hip-Hop Albums chart, and number 6 on the Independent Albums chart.

== Track listing ==
Credits adapted from the liner notes of Let's Do It Again.

Let's Do It Again track listing
No.	Title	Writer(s)	Length
1.	"Clean Up Woman"	Clarence Reid; Willie Clarke	4:24
2.	"Miss You"	Mick Jagger; Keith Richards	5:25
3.	"It's a Man's Man's Man's World"	James Brown; Betty Jean Newsome	5:06
4.	"Baby I'm Scared of You"	Cecil Womack; Linda Womack	5:31
5.	"You Know How to Love Me"	James Mtume; Reggie Lucas	4:04
6.	"I Want to Know What Love Is"	Mick Jones	7:13
7.	"Nobody Knows You When You're Down and Out"	Jimmy Cox	3:52
8.	"I Try"	Angela Bofill	4:54
9.	"I'd Rather Be with You"	Bootsy Collins; George Clinton; Gary Cooper	5:23
10.	"Simply Beautiful"	Al Green	5:10
11.	"Let's Do It Again"	Curtis Mayfield	5:01

== Personnel ==
Musicians

- Leela James – vocals, backing vocals
- Teodross Avery – saxophone
- Roland Barber – trombone
- Kenyatta Beasley – trumpet
- Rudy Bird – percussion
- Melonie Daniels – backing vocals
- Ralph "Buttaz" Kearns – keyboards, vocals
- Andrea Martin – backing vocals
- Ricardo Ramos – guitar
- Steve "Supe" White – drums

Production

- Leela James – producer, executive producer, vocal producer
- Dave Darlington – mixing
- Eric Elterman – engineer
- Randall Grass – executive producer
- Ralph "Buttaz" Kearns – associate producer
- Kevin "K.T." Terrell – photography
- Paul Wickliffe – mastering
- Suzette Williams – executive producer

== Charts ==
Chart (2009)	Peak position
US Billboard 200	84
US Top R&B/Hip-Hop Albums (Billboard)	11
US Independent Albums (Billboard)	6
