= Disrespectful (song) =

Single by Chaka Khan featuring Mary J. Blige

from the album Funk This
- Released: July 24, 2007
- Genre: Funk; go-go; R&B
- Length: 4:44
- Label: Sony BMG
- Songwriters: Mary J. Blige; Jimmy Jam; Terry Lewis; Bobby Ross Avila; Issiah "IZ" Avila; Dave Young
- Producers: Jam; Lewis; Avila; IZ

Chaka Khan singles chronology
"Angel" (2007)	"Disrespectful" (2007)	"You Belong to Me" (2007)

"Disrespectful" is a song by American recording artist Chaka Khan featuring vocals by singer Mary J. Blige. It was written by Blige along with Jimmy Jam and Terry Lewis, Bobby Ross Avila, Dave Young and Issiah J. Avila, and produced for Khan's eleventh studio album Funk This (2007). "Disrespectful" went to number one on the US dance charts. It won Khan and Blige the Grammy Award for Best R&B Performance by a Duo or Group with Vocals at the 50th Annual Grammy Awards.

== Charts ==
Weekly chart performance for "Disrespectful"
Chart (2007)	Peak position
US Dance Club Songs (Billboard)	1

== See also ==
- List of number-one dance singles of 2007 (U.S.)
