= Charlene (song) =

Single by Anthony Hamilton

from the album Comin' from Where I'm From
- Released: August 3, 2004
- Recorded: 2002–2003
- Genre: R&B, soul
- Length: 4:06
- Label: So So Def, Zomba, Arista
- Songwriters: Anthony Hamilton, Mark Batson
- Producer: Mark Batson

Anthony Hamilton singles chronology
"Comin' from Where I'm From" (2003)	"Charlene" (2004)	"Can't Let Go" (2005)

"Charlene" is an R&B–soul song written and performed by American singer-songwriter Anthony Hamilton, released by So So Def Recordings and Arista Records on August 3, 2004 as the second and final single from Hamilton's second studio album, Comin' from Where I'm From (2003).

Prior to its release, he was signed to six record labels, and had unsuccessful experiences. Produced by Mark Batson, who also co-wrote the song, "Charlene" was nominated for Best Male R&B Vocal Performance at the 47th Annual Grammy Awards, but lost to Prince's "Call My Name".

"Charlene" was sampled by California rapper Murs on the song "Break Up (The OJ Song)" from his 2008 album Murs for President.

== Chart performance ==
"Charlene" initially debuted at number twenty-one on the Bubbling Under R&B/Hip-Hop Singles in early March 2004, where it stayed for thirteen weeks. It topped the chart the week of May 1, 2004 (its ninth week on the run). The song managed to jump to the Hot R&B/Hip-Hop Songs at number seventy-eight the week of June 5, 2004; it spent forty-six weeks on the chart and peaked at number three. On the Billboard Hot 100, it entered at number seventy-two the week of September 4, 2004, starting a twenty-two-week run which led to a number-nineteen peak (after staying for three weeks on the Bubbling Under Hot 100 Singles, where it reached number three). "Charlene" remains as Hamilton's most successful single to date.

== Awards and nominations ==
After the release of his second studio album Comin' From where I'm from in 2004. Anthony Hamilton got his first Grammy nominations for Best R/B song for "Charlene" and Best contemporary R/B album for Comin' from where I'm fromand Best Traditional R/B Vocal Performance. He was also nominated for the Billboard Music Awards for New R/B/Hip-Hop artist of the year. In 2005 Hamilton was also nominated for NAACP Image Awards for "Charlene" in the Outstanding song category. He was also nominated for the R/B soul single for "Charlene" at the Soul Train Music Award.

== Critical reception ==
R&B music critics and other listeners of Anthony Hamilton's album,Comin' from Where I'm From (2003) seemed to generally enjoy the album and praised his soulfully unique voice. Daryl Easlea of "BBC" online music review editor and writer says great things about the album such as, "Hamilton is perhaps the connoisseur’s choice amongst the many sensitive male singer-songwriters of the 90s and 00s." and "Hamilton’s unhurried voice conveys passion and pain with a rich, smoky soulfulness that echoes his influences – Green, Sly Stone and Marvin Gaye. But his style is not just a simple regurgitation of these fabled talents; Hamilton’s delivery feels fresh and new. His pieces unfold at a leisurely pace, but never outstay their welcome." Many other reviewers agreed and said similar things not only about the album but particularly "Charlene". Daryl stated it was "Arguably Hamilton’s defining moment, keening ballad of Charlene is a perfect example of his craft, relaxed almost to the point of soporific." Comin' from Where I'm From became popular in the US it went top 20 and Platinum-Certified; it also received some "Grammy Award" nominations.

== Music video ==
The music video begins with Anthony Hamilton (the singer) opening the door to a house him and his wife share. It is obvious that it's late and that he didn't want to wake up his wife (Charlene). Right after that scene the camera shows the clock next to their bed {4:30am}, and his wife lying in the bed with her eyes wide open, awakened by the sound of the door. A second after that scene the camera brings back the focus on the singer. Anthony is now putting all his bags down to the floor and carefully walking up the stairs toward their bedroom. Then the video shows Anthony taking off his shirt and clamming up to the bed to cuddle with his wife. At that moment the video shows the wife's frustration by showing her rolling her eyes. Right after that scene the video changes to a different scene: Anthony is now sitting on the bed with a letter in his hands. The song begins by saying “woke up this morning found a letter that she wrote. She said she’s tired that I’m always on the road.” The next scene goes back to the day he left for his tour. This scene shows them arguing and him walking away from her and going into the road bus. This video had a lot of movements and characters, throughout the rest of the song it showed him day dreaming about their happier days. However the music video ends with Charlene going to her mom and her mom finding the ultrasound of her unborn baby.

== Track listing ==
1. "Charlene" (Radio Mix) - 4:06
2. "Charlene" (Instrumental) - 4:06

== Chart performance ==
"Technically his fourth album, Comin' from Where I'm From bowed for So So Def in 2003 and featured "Charlene," a classic-sounding Southern soul ballad that reached number three on the R&B chart."

== Charts ==
=== Weekly charts ===
Chart (2004)	Peak position
US Billboard Hot 100	19
US Hot R&B/Hip-Hop Songs (Billboard)	3

=== Year-end charts ===
Chart (2004)	Position
US Hot R&B/Hip-Hop Songs (Billboard)	44
Chart (2005)	Position
US Hot R&B/Hip-Hop Songs (Billboard)	36

== Certifications ==
Certifications for "Charlene"
Region	Certification	Certified units/sales
United States (RIAA)	2× Platinum	2,000,000^{‡}
^{‡} Sales+streaming figures based on certification alone.
