= Hello Happiness =

2019 studio album by Chaka Khan

Studio album by Chaka Khan
- Released: February 15, 2019
- Recorded: 2018—2019
- Studio: Fever (Hollywood); Diary (London); Resonate Music (Burbank); Clear Lake (Hollywood); Glenwood (Burbank); Orange Couch
- Genre: Dance; disco
- Length: 27:10
- Label: Diary; Island
- Producer: Switch; Sarah Ruba

Chaka Khan chronology
Funk This (2007)	Hello Happiness (2019)	Chakzilla (2026)

Singles from Hello Happiness
- 1. "Like Sugar" Released: April 21, 2018; 2. "Hello Happiness" Released: January 1, 2019

Hello Happiness is the twelfth studio album by American singer Chaka Khan, released on February 15, 2019. It is her first new material since 2007's Funk This. It includes the 2018 single "Like Sugar", and the second single, the title track "Hello Happiness". "Hello Happiness" was first performed at the 2019 Rose Parade in Pasadena, California. The front cover photograph is Khan at 8525 Sepulveda Boulevard, Los Angeles, California.

== Background ==
Khan stated that she did not stop making music following the release of Funk This but "simply stopped releasing material", and also needed time to recover following the death of recording artist Prince in 2016, which she has said made her "rethink" herself and admit herself into rehab for addiction to prescription drugs.

== Music ==
The album features both a "contemporary" feeling as well as "strong echoes of the past, such as the late '70s New York disco scene". About the lyrics of the title track, Khan said: "I think we need a shot of just not taking the little things so seriously. Little things are important. It's about the little things, but just flow." Khan co-wrote all the tracks on the album.

== Critical reception ==
Professional ratings
Aggregate scores
Source	Rating
Metacritic	68/100
Review scores
Source	Rating
AllMusic	3/5 stars
Chicago Tribune	2.5/4 stars
Exclaim!	6/10
The Guardian	3/5 stars
The Observer	4/5 stars
Pitchfork	5.9/10
Slant	3.5/5 stars

Hello Happiness received generally favorable reviews from music critics. At Metacritic, which assigns a normalized rating out of 100 to reviews from mainstream critics, the album has an average score of 68 based on six reviews, indicating "generally favorable reviews". Damien Morris, writing for Observer, called Hello Happiness a "vital calling card to remind everyone to come hear this unearthly voice, still sizzling with spice. Producer Switch sashays through a bunch of styles, taking on orchestral disco, blues, funk and even a little dubstep with a bright confidence."

Slant Magazine's Zachary Hoskins wrote that while "sometimes the production steals the spotlight a little too much [...] much of the credit for Hello Happiness's relentlessly good vibes goes to co-producers Switch and singer-songwriter Sarah Ruba Taylor, who plunder the sounds of Khan's 1970s and ’80s output for a mélange of styles and textures." Michael Cragg from The Guardian felt that the album "pays respect to Khan’s funk and disco heydays, drawing a through-line via modern production’s showy window dressing."

AllMusic editor Andy Kellman wrote: "Khan is uninhibited and impassioned, as always. Even when a surplus of synthesizers, organs, and flame-throwing guitars threaten to overtake her elsewhere, she cuts straight through with full-tilt, life-affirming power." Exclaim! noted that "Khan hasn't lost her magic. But in an attempt to do it all, Hello Happiness loses its way [...] Without something steady to anchor it all, Hello Happiness sound less like an album and more like a compilation of stand-alones." Chicago Tribune critic Greg Kot found that "at 65, Khan remains a robust-yet-pliant singer and percussionist [..] "Sugar" carved out a path to the dancefloor, but it also made Khan sound like a heavily filtered singer-for-hire as she belted out the hook. The song anchors "Hello Happiness," and the remaining six tracks are essentially more of the same". Pitchfork's Jackson Howard felt that the "album largely ignores all the qualities that made the Queen of Funk a legend in the first place [...] Instead of emphasizing the live instrumentation, hair-raising harmonies, and goosebump-inducing modulations of Funk This, the 2007 album anchored by longtime collaborators Jimmy Jam and Terry Lewis that maximized her talents, Hello Happiness is a messy, overproduced, anonymous set of hotel-lobby beats that makes woeful use of one of the greatest voices of all time.

== Commercial performance ==
Hello Happiness debuted and peaked at number 18 on the UK Albums Chart in the week of February 28, 2019, becoming Khan's highest-charting album since 1984's I Feel for You.

== Track listing ==
Hello Happiness track listing
No.	Title	Writer(s)	Producer(s)	Length
1.	"Hello Happiness"	Yvette Stevens; David Taylor; Sarah Ruba Taylor; Thomas Gill; Sam Wilkes	Switch; Sarah Ruba	3:56
2.	"Like a Lady"	Stevens; D. Taylor; S. Taylor; Sanford Livingston; Amy Stroup; Troydon Murison; Lincoln Cleary	Livingston; Switch; Ruba; Murison^{[b]}	5:00
3.	"Don't Cha Know"	Stevens; D. Taylor; S. Taylor; Gill; Eli Winderman	Switch; Ruba; Chaka Khan^{[a]}; Murison^{[a]}	3:18
4.	"Too Hot"	Stevens; D. Taylor; S. Taylor; Andrea Fratangelo; Murison; Cleary; Eddie Lee Langolis	Bot; Switch; Ruba; Khan^{[a]}	3:45
5.	"Like Sugar"	Stevens; D. Taylor; S. Taylor; William Curtis; John Flippin	Switch; Ruba	3:59
6.	"Isn't That Enough"	Stevens; D. Taylor; S. Taylor	Switch; Ruba; Murison^{[b]}	3:31
7.	"Ladylike"	Stevens; D. Taylor; S. Taylor; Stroup; Ricardo Rouse; Livingston	Switch; Ruba; Murison^{[b]}	3:45
Total length:				27:10

Japan bonus track
No.	Title	Writer(s)	Producer(s)	Length
8.	"Like Sugar" (Switch Remix)	Stevens; D. Taylor; S. Taylor; William Curtis; John Flippin	Switch; Ruba	3:47
Total length:				31:01

== Charts ==
Weekly chart performance for Hello Happiness
Chart (2019)	Peak position
Belgian Albums (Ultratop Flanders)	70
Dutch Albums (Album Top 100)	178
Scottish Albums (Official Charts)	10
Swiss Albums (Schweizer Hitparade)	32
UK Albums (Official Charts)	18
US Top Album Sales (Billboard)	48

== Release history ==
Hello Happiness release history
Region	Date	Format(s)	Label
Various	February 15, 2019	Digital download; CD	Island Records
Various	March 1, 2019	LP	Island Records
