= The Point of It All =

Studio album by Anthony Hamilton
- Released: December 16, 2008
- Studios: Chalice, Los Angeles (Note: Tracks 1, 3, 7, 13 and 14); Charles Holloman, Charlotte, North Carolina (Note: Track 2); Studio 609, Philadelphia (Note: Track 4); Instrument Zoo, Miami (Note: Track 5); Henson, Hollywood (Note: Tracks 6 and 10); Circle House, Miami (Note: Track 8); Flyte Tyme, Santa Monica, California (Note: Track 9); CHP Audio, Charlotte, North Carolina (Note: Tracks 11 and 12)
- Length: 59:20
- Labels: Mister's Music; So So Def; Zomba
- Producers: The Avila Brothers; Mark Batson; Vidal Davis; Anthony Hamilton; Andre Harris; Heavy D; SalaamRemi.com; Jack Splash; Kelvin Wooten; James "Big Jim" Wright

Anthony Hamilton chronology
Southern Comfort (2007)	The Point of It All (2008)	Back to Love (2011)

Singles from The Point of It All
- 1. "Cool" Released: September 12, 2008; 2. "The Point of It All"

The Point of It All is the fourth studio album by American singer Anthony Hamilton. It was released by Mister's Music, So So Def Recordings, and Zomba on December 16, 2008, in the United States. The album's production was handled by Hamilton himself along with Mark Batson, Kevin Wooten, Dre & Vidal, James "Big Jim" Wright and Salaam Remi, among others.

The album debuted at number 12 on the US Billboard 200 and at number three on the Top R&B/Hip-Hop Albums chart, selling 133,000 copies in its first week of release, the highest sales week of his career. Upon its release, The Point of It All received generally positive reviews from most music critics. As of May 2010, the album had sold over 519,000 copies in the United States and was certified gold by the Recording Industry Association of America (RIAA).

== Singles ==
The album's lead single "Cool" featuring David Banner, and it peaked at number 74 on the US Billboard Hot 100 and at number 19 on the Hot R&B/Hip-Hop Songs chart.

== Critical reception ==
Professional ratings
Aggregate scores
Source	Rating
Metacritic	72/100
Review scores
Source	Rating
About.com	4/5 stars
AllMusic	4/5 stars
Entertainment Weekly	B
The Phoenix	2/4 stars
PopMatters	8/10
Rolling Stone	3/5 stars
Spin	4/5 stars
USA Today	3/4 stars

The Point of It All received generally positive reviews from music critics. At Metacritic, which assigns a normalized rating out of 100 to reviews from mainstream publications, the album received an average score of 72, based on nine reviews. Vibe editor Erika Ramirez wrote that "there are no true missteps on this set, although he does veer a bit left with the upbeat, almost cheerful content, but the turn is not aggressive enough to lose the fans following behind him. The joyful arrangement in The Point of It All enhances Hamilton's storytelling abilities, serving as a lovely mixer to his lyrical depth and sensual, rich voice. All the tools were present and properly used to create this masterpiece." Andy Kellman of AllMusic felt that "at least a third of the album's contents would have to be part of any representative introduction to Hamilton. In fact, this puts a cap on a three-album run as remarkable as any other in 2000s R&B."

Mike Joseph of PopMatters viewed Hamilton as "an artist capable of filling the void created when Gerald LeVert and Luther Vandross passed away. Mike Joseph of PopMatters wrote, "His raspy tone has drawn comparisons to everyone from Bill Withers to Bobby Womack, [...] he's proven himself to be one of the few current artists capable of sounding like an authentic throwback (as opposed to a pale facsimile) and completely contemporary at the same time." Entertainment Weekly's Greg Kot felt that the siner "avoids slavish retro-ism with a smart mix of programmed beats and churchy keyboards, and a voice that bridges seduction and gospel fervor. Though Anthony Hamilton sings about adult relationships with nuance and intensity, there is a drawback: He tends to keep his pleas at a midtempo simmer."

Jon Pareles from The New York Times noted that "Hamilton won't place himself in the niche of gospel. He's a contender in the secular realm of R&B who sings hooks for hip-hop songs between his own albums, and he's determined to reach current radio audiences without jettisoning his roots." In his review for The Washington Post, Bill Friskics-Warren wrote: "Though rooted in tradition (both the streets and the church), Hamilton's latest is thoroughly contemporary, from the bumping grooves of the mid-tempo ballads to the record's mix of programmed and live beats." The New Yorker″s Ben Greenman found that "the album’s overall emotional heft reduces [some] complaints to quibbles and magnifies its charms into considerable achievements." USA Today editor Steve Jones found noted that Hamilton was "one of the genre’s rare singers who finds joy in life’s small pleasures and appreciates relationships that are built to last. That's really keeping it real."

== Commercial performance ==
The Point of It All debuted and peaked at number twelve on the US Billboard 200 and number three on the Top R&B/Hip-Hop Albums chart, with first week sales of 133,000 units, becoming Hamilton's highest-charting album yet. On May 27, 2010, The Point of It All was certified Gold by the Recording Industry Association of America (RIAA) for shipments figures in excess of 500,000 copies.

== Track listing ==
The Point of It All track listing
No.	Title	Writer(s)	Producer(s)	Length
1.	"The News"	Anthony Hamilton; Mark Batson	Batson	3:34
2.	"Cool" (featuring David Banner)	Hamilton; Kelvin Wooten; Lavell Crump; Ramon Montgomery	Wooten	4:16
3.	"The Day We Met"	Hamilton; Batson	Batson	3:58
4.	"Diamond in the Rough"	Hamilton; Andre Harris; Vidal Davis	Harris; Davis	3:37
5.	"I Did It for Sho"	Hamilton; Salaam Remi	SalaamRemi.com	3:19
6.	"Hard to Breathe"	Hamilton; Batson	Batson	4:12
7.	"Soul's on Fire"	Hamilton; Batson	Batson	4:23
8.	"Please Stay"	Hamilton; Jack Splash	Jack Splash	5:03
9.	"The Point of It All"	Hamilton; Bobby Ross Avila; Issiah J. Avila; James Wright	The Avila Brothers; James "Big Jim" Wright^{[a]}	3:50
10.	"Fallin' in Love"	Hamilton; Batson	Batson	3:07
11.	"Prayin' for You/Superman"	Hamilton; Wooten	Wooten; Hamilton^{[a]}	7:54
12.	"Her Heart"	Hamilton; Wooten	Wooten	4:03
13.	"Fine Again"	Hamilton; Wooten	Wooten	4:30
14.	"She's Gone" (bonus track)	Hamilton; Dwight Myers	Heavy D	3:28
Total length:				59:20

Notes

- ^{^[a]} signifies a co-producer

== Charts ==
=== Weekly charts ===
Weekly chart performance for The Point of It All
Chart (2008)	Peak position
US Billboard 200	12
US Top R&B/Hip-Hop Albums (Billboard)	3

=== Year-end charts ===
2009 year-end chart performance for The Point of It All
Chart (2009)	Position
US Billboard 200	72
US Top R&B/Hip-Hop Albums (Billboard)	8

2010 year-end chart performance for The Point of It All
Chart (2010)	Position
US Top R&B/Hip-Hop Albums (Billboard)	94

== Certifications ==
Certifications for The Point of It All
Region	Certification	Certified units/sales
United States (RIAA)	Gold	500,000^{^}
^{^} Shipments figures based on certification alone.
