= Did It for Love (album) =

2017 studio album by Leela James

Studio album by Leela James
- Released: March 31, 2017
- Labels: Shesangz; BMG
- Producers: Leela James (exec.); Rex Rideout (exec.)

Leela James chronology
Fall for You (2014)	Did It for Love (2017)	See Me (2021)

Singles from Did It for Love
- 1. "Don't Want You Back" Released: 2016; 2. "All Over Again" Released: 2017; 3. "I Remember" Released: 2017; 4. "Don't Mean A Thang" Released: 2017

Did It for Love is the sixth studio album by American singer-songwriter Leela James. It was released by Shesangz Music under exclusive license to BMG Rights Management on March 31, 2017. The album peaked at number 30 on the US Billboard Top R&B/Hip-Hop Albums chart and number 72 on the Billboard 200. The album's lead single, "Don't Want You Back", was released on October 21, 2016, and reached number one on the Billboard Adult R&B Songs chart.

== Critical reception ==
Professional ratings
Review scores
Source	Rating
AllMusic	4/5 stars
Pop Magazine	4/5 stars

Allmusic editor Andy Kellman found that Did It for Love producers James and Rex Rideout, "joined by several additional associates, are well-matched, evidently capable of covering a lot of emotional range and tying it all together. Dismissal, wistfulness, and contentment are among the many romantic conditions they soundtrack here, and they manage to do it with a perspective that is steeped in soul tradition but fresh for 2017 [...] Fans of James' earlier output might balk at perceived impurities, like snaking/rattling trap-style drums that undergird some of the tracks, but they're secondary, utilized with finesse, like a natural evolution of what the likes of Kashif and Jimmy Jam and Terry Lewis did with machines during the early '80s."

== Track listing ==
Credits adapted from the liner notes of Did It for Love.

No.	Title	Producer(s)	Length
1.	"Hard for Me"	Evan Brice	3:21
2.	"Don't Mean a Thang"	Calvin "Tubby" Frazier*	3:10
3.	"Don't Want You Back"	J Hammond; Leela James	3:37
4.	"Real Talk – Relationships (Interlude)"	Dawaun "D Park" Parker; Phil Beaudreau	0:28
5.	"I Remember"	Hammond; James	3:58
6.	"Good to Love You" (featuring Dave Hollister)	Hammond; James	3:59
7.	"There 4 U"	Butta-N-Bizkit	4:07
8.	"This Day Is for You"	Jairus "JMo" Mozee	4:08
9.	"Take Me"	Hammond; James	3:28
10.	"All Over Again"	Hammond; James	3:49
11.	"Our Love"	Hammond; James	3:36
12.	"Did It for Love"	Hammond; James	3:14

== Charts ==
Chart (2017)	Peak position
US Billboard 200	72
US Top R&B/Hip-Hop Albums (Billboard)	30
