= Lina (American singer) =

American singer-songwriter

- Born: Shelina Wade; Denver, Colorado, U.S.
- Origin: Los Angeles, U.S.
- Genres: R&B; soul; jazz; gospel
- Occupations: Singer; songwriter; record producer; painter; CEO
- Instruments: Vocals, piano
- Years active: 1999-present
- Labels: MoodStar, Hidden Beach, Atlantic/East West, Monarchy Records
- Website: Lina Music

Shelina Wade (born in Denver, Colorado), commonly known as Lina, is an American R&B and soul singer and songwriter.

== Early life ==
Lina was born in Denver, Colorado and raised in, Texas. Lina’s introduction to music started at the age of four when she began singing at church. After cultivating her gospel and jazz roots by touring with the church choir, performing with her mother and singing at social gatherings, Lina was signed to Atlantic first as a songwriter and then as a singer. Influenced by singers from Josephine Baker to Sarah Vaughan to Sade, Lina began developing a signature vocal style that could be described as a mixture of swing, r&b, and jazz meets modern day soul.

== Music career ==
In 1998, Lina got her first big break as a songwriter by penning a tune for Tyrese's self-titled debut album. Lina proved herself to also be a solid songwriter, penning "Ain't Nothing Like a Jones" for Tyrese.

Lina began her career in 2000 when she signed to Atlantic Records. Following her record deal, was the release of her first album, Stranger on Earth, which was introduced on August 21, 2001. Stranger on Earth was critically acclaimed for its blend of R&B with swing and vocal jazz. The title track was a cover version of a Dinah Washington track. The album featured the singles "Playa No Mo", "It's Alright", "I'm Not The Enemy", and "Don't Say Nothin'". The first single "Playa No Mo" became a minor hit, reaching #46 in UK, while the album reached #89 on the Billboard R&B and hip-hop album chart. Stranger on Earth was placed among the Top 10 R&B Albums of the Year by Billboard Magazine. It was named the #1 R&B Album of the Year by Tower Records' "Pulse" magazine, and #1 album by cdnow.com. Nevertheless, Lina asked to be released from her contract and Atlantic granted her release; three months later she was signed to Hidden Beach.

In 2003, Lina signed to Hidden Beach Records and launched her own record label, Moodstar Recordings. In 2004, she began recording her second album. Entitled The Inner Beauty Movement, it was released in June 2005 on the Hidden Beach Recordings record label. The lead single Smooth received heavy airplay nationwide with the endorsement of Stevie Wonder and radio personality Michael Baisden "Smooth" became Lina's biggest record and is now known as a "Steppers" anthem. The jazz influenced "Leaving You" from the IBM album received airplay on jazz stations like "The Wave" and made Billboard jazz charts followed by the release of the single Come to Mamanow popular in the "Hip hop" community. Four songs from "The Inner Beauty Movement" were considered for Grammys in 2006 the titles were "Smooth", "Come To Mama" "Leaving You" and "Hope Wish and Pray". "Smooth" was nominated for a Soultrain Award that same year.

In 2007, Lina played a jazz singer performing "Santa Baby" in Sony pictures the movie "This Christmas" Starring Idris Elba and Chris Brown. Lina also returned to the studio to begin working on her third album, she recorded a total of 17 tracks for the album. Lina released her third album-to-date, Morning Star, by her own label, Mood Star Recordings.

Morning Star debuted on the market in February 2008. The album spawn three singles "Feel The Love", "I'll Stick Around", and "Good Day". Lina continued to give her fans new music by introducing a special single titled "My Man".

Two tracks lifted from the Morning Star album featured on the Independent Soul Divas series on the UK label, Lola Waxx: "Feel The Love" (Volume 1 2008) and "Get It Right" (Volume 2 2009).

Many of Lina's songs are featured in movie such as "High Crimes" with Morgan Freeman and Ashley Judd, "Guess Who" starring Ashton Kutcher, Eddie Murphy's "Pluto Nash", John Travolta's "Lucky Numbers" and more including the Truth Hall film soundtrack released on November 12, 2009 on Utopia Recordings. The songs performed by Lina included "Breathe", "Dough", "Illuminating", and "On My Own". In 2010, she released her compilation album Vintage, which consisted of unreleased songs.

In September 2012, she released her fourth studio album The Love Chronicles of a Lady Songbird. In that same year, song "Said -N- Done" was featured in the urban farming documentary Urban Roots.

In January 2013 Lina Signed with Monarchy Records a division of Spectra Records, "The Love Chronicles of a Lady Songbird" officially released on Monarchy Records. In October 2014 the Motown inspired Ep the "Loveride" released on Soulside productions is currently making waves. The single "Dip" made UK's Soul Music Top 50 most played songs for 2014. Lina continues to give her fans the music and inspiration they love her for.

== Discography ==
=== Albums ===
- Stranger on Earth (2001) (#89 US R&B, #130 UK)
- Save Your Soul, Vol. 1 (2005)
- The Inner Beauty Movement (2005)
- Morning Star (2008)
- Vintage (2010)
- The Love Chronicles of a Lady Songbird (2012)
- Love Ride (2015)

=== Singles ===
Single	Year	Peak chart positions				Album
Single	Year	US R&B	US Adult	US Jazz	UK	Album
"Playa No Mo"	2001	—	—	—	46	Stranger on Earth
"It's Alright"	2001	—	—	—	—	Stranger on Earth
"I'm Not the Enemy"	2001	—	—	—	—	Stranger on Earth
"Don't Say Nothin'"	2002	—	—	—	—	Stranger on Earth
"Smooth"	2005	107	27	—	—	The Inner Beauty Movement
"Come to Mama"	2005	—	—	—	—	The Inner Beauty Movement
"Leaving You"	2005	—	—	28	—	The Inner Beauty Movement
"Feel The Love"	2008	115	—	—	—	Morning Star
"I'll Stick Around"	2008	—	—	—	—	Morning Star
"Good Day"	2008	—	—	—	—	Morning Star
"I Won't Let My Baby Down (My Man)"	2009	—	—	—	—	The Love Chronicles of a Lady Songbird
"Your Love"	2014	—	—	—	—	The Love Chronicles of a Lady Songbird
"Dip"	2015	—	—	—	—	Love Ride
