= A Change Is Gonna Come (Leela James album) =

Studio album by Leela James
- Released: June 21, 2005
- Studios: Bennett Studios (Englewood, New Jersey; Platinum Sound Recording Studios (New York City, New York)
- Length: 64:54
- Label: Warner Bros.
- Producers: Leela James (exec.); Commissioner Gordon (exec.); Bobby Ross Avila; Iz Avila; Vikter Duplaix; Jerry Duplessis; Aaron Harris; Wyclef Jean; James Poyser; Raphael Saadiq; Chucky Thompson; Kanye West

Leela James chronology
A Change Is Gonna Come (2005)	Let's Do It Again (2009)

Singles from A Change Is Gonna Come
- 1. "Music" Released: 2005; 2. "My Joy" Released: 2006

A Change Is Gonna Come is the debut album by American soul singer Leela James. It was released on Warner Bros. Records on June 21, 2005 in the United States. James began recording the album after signing with RuffNation Records in 2001, though its release was delayed for four years by label changes. She described its sound as "back-porch soul" and collaborated with producers including Jerry Duplessis, Kanye West, Raphael Saadiq, Chucky Thompson, and Commissioner Gordon.

The album received generally positive reviews, with critics praising James' soulful vocals and calling it a "solid neo-soul release" with "creative production." Some reviewers, however, criticized its lack of variety and the title track as "too reverent to excite." Commercially, it achieved modest success, peaking at number 148 on the US Billboard 200 and number 42 on the Top R&B/Hip-Hop Albums chart, while also charting in several European countries. A Change Is Gonna Come produced five singles, including "Music" and "My Joy," both of which reached the top 30 on the US Adult R&B Songs chart.

== Background ==
James began recording A Change Is Gonna Come after signing with RuffNation Records and Warner Bros. in 2001. Although she impressed industry audiences through showcase performances, the album's release was delayed for four years following the dissolution of RuffNation, label restructuring at Warner Bros., and executive changes. During the delay, she continued performing, opening for acts including the Black Eyed Peas, Kem, and John Legend. James described the album as a response to contemporary R&B, calling her style "back-porch soul" and emphasizing its "raw singing" and authenticity. She co-wrote much of the album, working with producers including Kanye West, Raphael Saadiq, Wyclef Jean, Chucky Thompson, and Commissioner Gordon. James also covered Sam Cooke's "A Change Is Gonna Come" and No Doubt's "Don't Speak" for the album.

== Critical reception ==
Professional ratings
Review scores
Source	Rating
AllMusic	3/5 stars
Entertainment Weekly	B−
New Zealand Herald	3/5 stars
PopMatters	6/10
Vibe	4/5 stars

Boston Globe critic Renée Graham found that A Change Is Gonna Come "has brushes of hip-hop but is very much an R&B album, and a very good one at that. Leela James has a rich, compelling voice, and her CD is propelled more by pure talent than studio wizardry." People magazine found that "with the vintage R&B sounds on her debut [...] this petite woman with the big voice is a refreshing change from today's BET booty-shakers. The L.A. native has clearly learned well from the old-school masters; her husky vocals, equal parts gospel fervor and down-home grit, conjure shades of Mavis Staples, Betty Wright and Tina Turner." Entertainment Weekly's Michael Endelman called A Change Is Gonna Come it a "solid neo-soul release" with "creative production" and praising James' "wonderfully astringent vocals." He criticized her rendition of the title track as "too reverent to excite," though he described her cover of No Doubt's "Don't Speak" as "very cool." He also noted "a couple musical missteps" and "some sour, reactionary lyrics."

Allmusic editor Andy Kellman wrote that the album "retains a nostalgic tint. James has the stature of a woman who should possess a squeaky voice, but she sings with demonstrative grit. More importantly, she doesn't see her inspirations merely as artists to mimic; she sees how they learned from the past and applied it to the present. The past is built upon (if only a little), rather than simply revisited [...] There's plenty of thematic range, whether there are blue lights in the basement, tears on the pillow, sweat on the dancefloor, or sun showers on the porch." Rebecca Barry from The New Zealand Herald felt that A Change is Gonna Come "does ooze the kind of old-school vibe and heartfelt delivery that makes it easy to believe her when she sings about crying into her pillow. Butt while producers [...] try to mix up her styles [...] there's little to distinguish each song from the next."

== Commercial performance ==
A Change Is Gonna Come achieved modest chart success in several markets. In Europe, it reached number 26 on the Dutch Album Chart, number 43 in the Flemish refion of Belgium, number 52 in Sweden, and number 97 on the French Albums Chart. In the United States, the album peaked at number 148 on the Billboard 200 and performed more strongly on the Top R&B/Hip-Hop Albums chart, where it reached number 42.

== Track listing ==
Credits adapted from the liner notes of A Change Is Gonna Come.

A Change Is Gonna Come track listing
No.	Title	Writer(s)	Producer(s)	Length
1.	"Intro"			1:25
2.	"Music"	Leela James; Louis "Buster" Brown II; Scott "Shavoni" Parker	Bobby Ross Avila; Issiah Avila	4:03
3.	"Good Time"	James; Gordon Williams; Kenton Nix; Puff Johnson	Commissioner Gordon	4:16
4.	"Ghetto"	James; Wyclef Jean; Jerry Duplessis	Jean; Duplessis	3:50
5.	"Slappy" (Interlude)			0:57
6.	"Soul Food"	James; Raphael Saadiq	Saadiq	3:18
7.	"Rain"	James; Saadiq	Saadiq; Jake and the Phatman^{[A]}	4:08
8.	"Married" (Interlude)			1:40
9.	"When You Love Somebody"	James; Williams; Johnson	Commissioner Gordon	4:30
10.	"Mistreating Me"	James; Aaron Harris; Ahmad A. Lewis	Harris; Commissioner Gordon	5:13
11.	"Don't Speak"	Gwen Stefani; Eric Stefani	Harris; Commissioner Gordon; James^{[A]}	4:46
12.	"Bummy" (Interlude)			0:52
13.	"My Joy"	James; James Poyser; Vikter Duplaix; Carvin Haggins; Tend Lewis	Poyser; Duplaix	4:57
14.	"It's Alright"	James; Kanye West; Williams; Renée Neufville	Commissioner Gordon; West; James^{[A]}	4:03
15.	"Didn't I"	James; West	Commissioner Gordon; West	3:17
16.	"Prayer"	James; Johnson; Chucky Thompson	Thompson	3:57
17.	"I Know I've Been Changed" (Interlude)			2:05
18.	"A Change Is Gonna Come"	Sam Cooke	Commissioner Gordon; James	3:35
19.	"Long Time Coming"	James; Williams	Commissioner Gordon; James^{[A]}	4:02

Notes

- ^{^[A]} denotes co-producer

Sample credits

- "Good Time" contains replayed elements from "Funky Sensation", written by Kenton Nix, performed by Gwen McCrae.
- "When You Love Somebody" contains elements of "I Love You More Than You'll Ever Know", written by Al Kooper.
- "Didn't I" embodies portions of "I Can't Fake It Anymore", written by D. Monda and T. Taylor.
- "Long Time Coming" embodies portions of "The Truth", written by Dwight Grant, Kanye West and Graham Nash and performed by Beanie Sigel.

== Charts ==
Chart (2005)	Peak position
Belgian Albums (Ultratop Flanders)	43
Dutch Albums (Album Top 100)	26
French Albums (SNEP)	97
Swedish Albums (Sverigetopplistan)	52
US Billboard 200	148
US Top R&B/Hip-Hop Albums (Billboard)	42
