= Home for the Holidays (Anthony Hamilton album) =

Studio album by Anthony Hamilton
- Released: October 21, 2014
- Length: 47:35
- Label: RCA
- Producers: The Avila Brothers; Kenneth Leonard Jr.; Mark Pelli; Alex Tanas; Corey Williams; Kelvin Wooten (also exec.)

Anthony Hamilton chronology
Back to Love (2011)	Home for the Holidays (2014)	What I'm Feelin' (2016)

Home for the Holidays is the first Christmas album by American recording artist Anthony Hamilton. It was released on October 21, 2014, by RCA Records.

== Critical reception ==
Professional ratings
Review scores
Source	Rating
AllMusic	3.5/5 stars

Allmusic editor Andy Kellman found that "Hamilton delivers a mostly upbeat mix of original material and renditions of traditional secular and religious Christmas-themed songs [..] The singer adds his typically hospitable tones to each of the selections, whether it's a faithful version of James Brown's "Santa Claus Go Straight to the Ghetto" or an energized spin on "Little Drummer Boy." This is more imaginative and festive than the average Christmas album."

== Track listing ==
No.	Title	Writer(s)	Producer(s)	Length
1.	"It's Christmas"	Anthony Hamilton; Brandon Davis; Kelvin Wooten	Wooten	4:41
2.	"Spend Christmas with You"	Hamilton; Joe Kirk; Kenneth Leonard Jr.; Corey Williams	Leonard; Williams; Wooten	4:17
3.	"Santa Claus Goes Straight to the Ghetto"	James Brown; Alfred Ellis; Hank Ballard	The Avila Brothers	3:04
4.	"Little Drummer Boy (Interlude)"		Wooten	1:36
5.	"Little Drummer Boy"	Katherine Kennicott Davis; Henry Onorati; Harry Simeone	Wooten	4:22
6.	"Home for the Holidays" (featuring Gavin DeGraw)	Hamilton; Wooten	Wooten	3:47
7.	"'Tis the Season"	Hamilton; Wooten	Wooten	3:38
8.	"What Do the Lonely Do at Christmas"	Homer Banks; Carl Hampton	The Avila Brothers	4:09
9.	"Coming Home"	Hamilton; Nasri Atweh; Mark Pellizer; Alex Tonas	Mark Pelli; Alex Tanas	3:20
10.	"Away in a Manger (Interlude)"		Wooten	0:40
11.	"Away in a Manger"		Wooten	2:47
12.	"Please Come Home for Christmas"	Charles Brown; Gene Redd	Wooten	2:56
13.	"The Christmas Song" (featuring Chaka Khan)	Bob Wells; Mel Tormé	Wooten	3:34
14.	"Spirit of Love"	Hamilton; Wooten	Wooten	4:33

== Credits and personnel ==
Credits are taken from the album's liner notes.

Managerial

- A&R – Adonis Sutherlin
- Executive producers – Anthony Hamilton, Kelvin Wooten, Eli Davis
- Management – Eli Davis
- Project coordinator – Kimrie Davis

Visuals and imagery

- Photography and design – LaVan Anderson
- Styling – Charity Luvs

== Charts ==
=== Weekly charts ===
Chart (2014)	Peak position
US Top R&B/Hip-Hop Albums (Billboard)	8

=== Year-end charts ===
Chart (2015)	Position
US Top R&B/Hip-Hop Albums (Billboard)	92
