= Loving You More... In the Spirit of Etta James =

Loving You More

Studio album by Leela James
- Released: July 31, 2012
- Length: 37:37
- Label: Shanachie
- Producers: Leela James (also exec.); Randall Grass (exec.); Drew and Shannon

Leela James chronology
My Soul (2010)	Loving You More (2012)	Fall for You (2014)

Loving You More... In the Spirit of Etta James is the fourth studio album by American recording artist Leela James. It was released by Shanachie Records on July 31, 2012 in the United States.

== Critical reception ==
Professional ratings
Review scores
Source	Rating
AllMusic	4/5 stars
PopMatters	7/10

Allmusic editor Andy Kellman praised the album as a "reverent and imaginative" tribute, highlighting James' creative rearrangements of Etta James' songs and her ability to make them her own. He singled out the transformation of "I'm Loving You More Every Day" and noted that the album successfully honored its inspiration while adding a distinctive modern perspective. PopMatters critic Steve Horowitz praised Loving You More... In the Spirit of Etta James for its modern reinterpretations of Etta James' songs and Leela James' ability to honor her influence. He noted that while some iconic songs, including "At Last" and "I'd Rather Go Blind," lacked the emotional intensity of the originals, the album successfully celebrated both artists' legacies.

== Commercial performance ==
Loving You More... In the Spirit of Etta James reached number 44 on the US Top R&B/Hip-Hop Albums chart, making it James' lowest-charting album to that point.

== Track listing ==
Loving You More... In the Spirit of Etta James track listing
No.	Title	Writer(s)	Length
1.	"Soul Will Never Die"	Leela James	1:30
2.	"Something's Got a Hold on Me"	Etta James; Leroy Kirkland; Pearl Woods	3:20
3.	"It Hurts Me So Much"	Charles Chalmers	3:21
4.	"I'm Loving You More Every Day"	Ronnie Mitchell	3:46
5.	"I'd Rather Go Blind"	Billy Foster; Ellington Jordan; Etta James	4:11
6.	"I Want to Ta-Ta You Baby"	Johnny "Guitar" Watson	3:48
7.	"Damn Your Eyes"	Steve Bogard; Barbara Wyrick	3:52
8.	"Nobody Loves You Like Me"	Gwen Gordy Fuqua; Harvey Fuqua	3:00
9.	"Old School Kind of Love"	Leela James	3:55
10.	"Sunday Kind of Love"	Barbara Belle; Anita Leonard; Stan Rhodes; Louis Prima	3:50
11.	"At Last"	Mack Gordon; Harry Warren	3:06
Total length:			37:37

== Charts ==
Chart (2012)	Peak position
US Top R&B/Hip-Hop Albums (Billboard)	44
