= Leela James =

American singer-songwriter from California

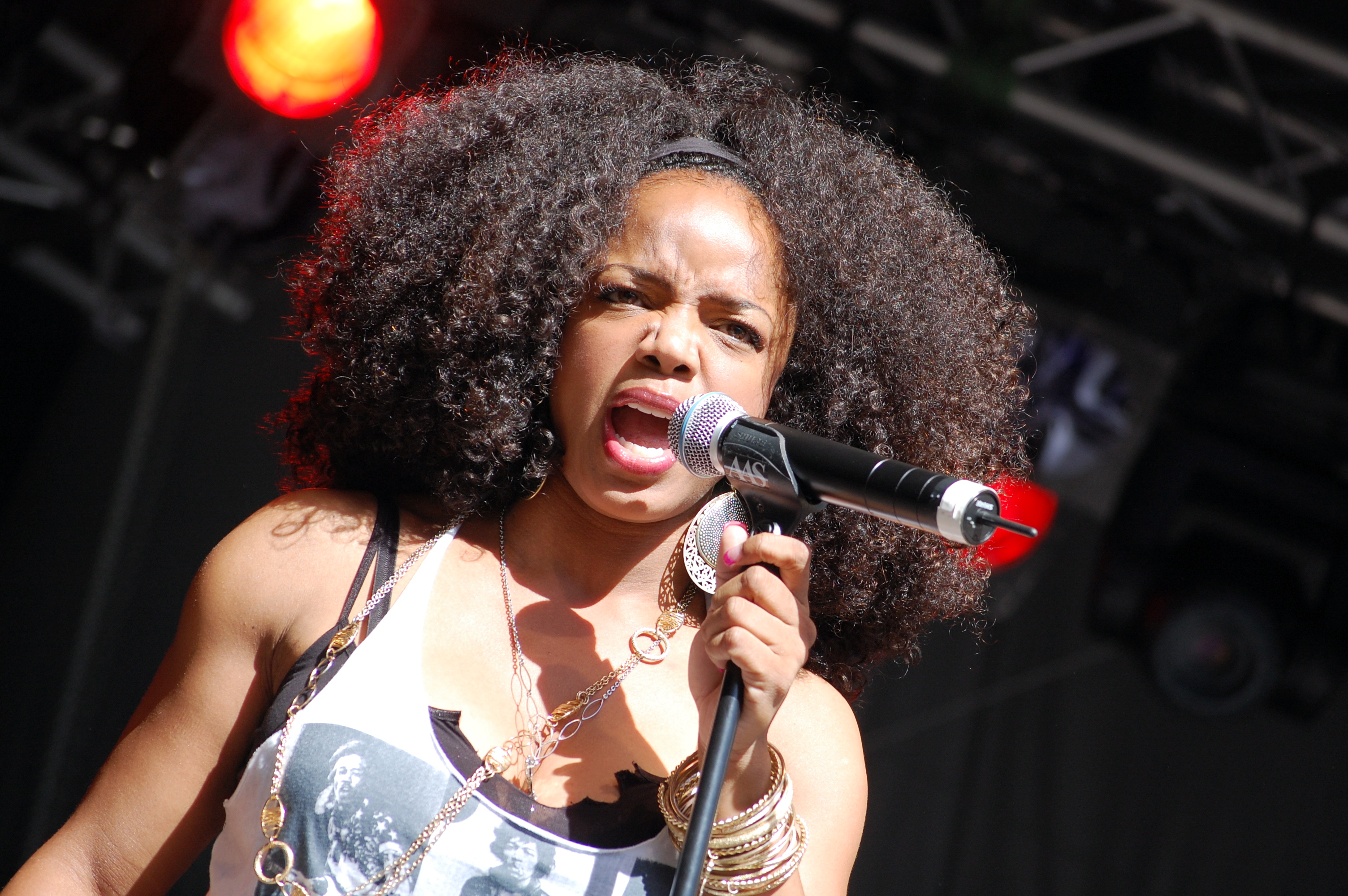
- James live at Stockholm Jazz Festival.

Background information
- Also known as: Alechia James
- Born: Alechia Janeice Campbell; June 2, 1983 (age 43); Los Angeles, California, U.S.
- Genres: R&B; soul
- Occupation: Singer-songwriter
- Years active: 2000–present
- Labels: Warner Bros.; Shanachie; Stax; BMG Rights Management; J&T Records
- Website: www.leelajames.com

Alechia Janeice Campbell (born May 22 1973), known professionally as Leela James, is an American R&B and soul singer-songwriter from Los Angeles, California.

== Music career ==
James made her debut on the soundtrack to the 2000 Jamie Foxx film Bait on the Roots song "Work", credited as Alechia James.

In 2004, James toured as an opening act for the Black Eyed Peas and Macy Gray. That same year, she was featured on hip hop producer, DJ, and emcee Pete Rock's album Soul Survivor II, providing vocals to the track "No Tears". In 2005, she lent her voice to the posthumously released Ray Charles album Genius & Friends, duetting with the singer on the song "Compared to What".

James' debut album, A Change Is Gonna Come, was released on June 21, 2005. James co-wrote most of the tracks on this album, two exceptions being her covers of the pop rock band No Doubt's 1996 hit "Don't Speak", and the Sam Cooke song "A Change Is Gonna Come". Notable collaborators on the album include Raphael Saadiq, Kanye West and Wyclef Jean.

James guested on Robert Randolph and the Family Band's 2006 album Colorblind, lending her vocals to "Stronger".

After parting ways with Warner Bros., James signed with the independent label Shanachie Records and released her second studio album on March 24, 2009, an all-cover set entitled Let's Do It Again, in homage to the Staple Singers.

In June 2009, James appeared on the Moby album Wait for Me, performing the vocal on "Walk with Me".

James' third album My Soul, her first with the Stax label, was released on May 24, 2010, and debuted on the US Hip Hop/R&B chart at No. 7. Speaking in May 2010 to UK soul writer Pete Lewis of Blues & Soul, she stated: "With this album I wanted to make sure that I showed all sides of me – in terms of variety in the music and in my vocal range – while at the same time making it clear that every song deeply came from my soul. Plus I also wanted to incorporate a little more hip hop this time, and infuse it with my traditional R&B – because I felt that. By making my beats edgier and harder-hitting, I'd show there was more to me than just doing ballads and things of that sort."

On July 31, 2012, James released her fourth studio album, Loving You More... In the Spirit of Etta James. Originally the album was going to have one song honoring Etta James, but with her death it became a full tribute album. It was released by Shanachie Records.

On July 8, 2014, James released her fifth studio album, Fall For You. The album's first two singles, "Say That" feat. Anthony Hamilton and "Fall For You" both reached Top 15 on the Billboard Urban AC charts, with "Fall For You" reaching No. 12. James supported her album with tours nationwide, including performances at Essence Music Festival, Arizona Jazz Fest, San Diego Jazz Fest, Capitol Jazz Fest, and more.

James' sixth album, Did It for Love was released on March 31, 2017, by Shesangz Music under license to BMG. The album has the singles "Don't Want You Back" released on October 28, 2016, "Hard for Me" released on February 25, 2017, "Don't Mean a Thang" released on March 27, 2017, and a video single "All Over Again" on May 4, 2017. The single "Don't Want You Back" reached number 1 on Billboard' Adult R&B Songs chart on April 15, 2017, becoming her highest-charting single ever.

In February 2021, James debuted the song "Complicated", the first single off her seventh studio album See Me. It peaked at No. 1 on Billboard' Adult R&B Songs chart becoming her second number one. Its music video is her most successful with more than 30 million views on Youtube.

== Television appearances ==
In 2014 and 2015, she starred in seasons 2 and 3 of the TV One reality show R&B Divas: Los Angeles.

== Influences ==
James cites singers James Brown, Roberta Flack, Toni Braxton, Marvin Gaye, Donny Hathaway, Gladys Knight, Mavis Staples, and Etta James as influences.

== Personal life ==
James is an honorary member of Zeta Phi Beta sorority; she was inducted on July 27, 2024 at the sorority's Boulé in Indianapolis, Indiana.

== Discography ==
=== Studio albums ===
- A Change Is Gonna Come (2005)
- Let's Do It Again (2009)
- My Soul (2010)
- Loving You More... In the Spirit of Etta James (2012)
- Fall for You (2014)
- Did It for Love (2017)
- See Me (2021)
- Thought U Knew (2023)

=== EPs ===
- Are You Ready? (2019) (with The Truth Band)
- 2BHONEST (2025)

== Awards and nominations ==
Year	Award	Category	Nominated work	Result
2005	NAACP Image Award	Outstanding New Artist	Leela James	Nominated
2008	Soul Train Music Award	Best R&B/Soul or Rap New Artist	"Music"	Nominated
2009	SoulTracks Readers Choice Award	Female Artist of the Year	Leela James	Won
