= Soulife =

Compilation album by Anthony Hamilton
- Released: June 20, 2005
- Recorded: 1999–2001
- Studio: Right Track, North Hollywood, California (Note: Track 1); Mama Jo's, North Hollywood, California (Note: Tracks 10 and 11; original recording on tracks 2–5); Reflection Sound, Charlotte, North Carolina (Note: Re-recording on tracks 2–5); Chung King, New York City (Note: Track 6); Ocean Recording, Burbank, California (Note: Tracks 10 and 11; original recording on track 7); Larrabee North, North Hollywood, California (Note: Track 12; original recording on track 7); Westlake, West Hollywood, California (Note: Track 8)
- Genre: R&B; soul; neo soul
- Length: 57:14
- Label: Atlantic; Rhino
- Producer: B.C. 3 Ent.; DK; Anthony Hamilton; Doug Mayhem; Mike City; Mark Sparks; Walter "Babi Luv" Stewart

Anthony Hamilton chronology
Comin' from Where I'm From (2003)	Soulife (2005)	Ain't Nobody Worryin' (2005)

Professional ratings
Review scores
Source	Rating
AllMusic	3.5/5 stars
Billboard	Favorable
Okayplayer	83/100
The San Diego Union-Tribune	3.5/4 stars

Soulife is the first compilation album by American singer Anthony Hamilton. It was released on June 20, 2005, by Atlantic and Rhino Records. His third album overall, the album is a collection of previously unreleased songs recorded by Hamilton. The song "Love and War", which features Macy Gray, appeared on the soundtrack to the 2001 film Baby Boy.

After leaving MCA Records, which shelved his debut album XTC in 1996, Hamilton found a home at Soulife Records, a small Los Angeles–based independent label, where he recorded tracks between 1999 and 2001 for what was supposed to be his second studio album. Soulife went bankrupt before it could release the material, leaving the album unreleased.

Soulife debuted at number 12 on the Billboard 200 and number four on the Top R&B/Hip-Hop Albums chart, selling 53,000 copies in its first week.

== Track listing ==
No.	Title	Writer(s)	Producer(s)	Length
1.	"I Used to Love Someone"	Anthony Hamilton; Doug Coleman	Doug Mayhem	5:51
2.	"I Cry"	Hamilton; Chris Deberry; Mark Sparks	B.C. 3 Ent.	4:25
3.	"Clearly"	Hamilton; Sparks	Sparks	4:05
4.	"Georgie Parker"	Hamilton; Deberry; Sparks; Ron Feemster	B.C. 3 Ent.	3:55
5.	"Day Dreamin'"	Hamilton; Sparks	Sparks	4:21
6.	"Ball and Chain"	Hamilton	Hamilton	3:39
7.	"Ol' Keeper"	Hamilton; Sparks	Sparks	4:40
8.	"Love and War" (featuring Macy Gray)	Sparks; Hamilton; Erick Coomes; Feemster; Erick Walls	Sparks	5:22
9.	"Last Night" (featuring Sunshine Anderson and Dolo Pichino)	Mike City; Anderson; Hamilton; Richard Elliot	Mike City	4:11
10.	"Love Is So Complicated"	Hamilton; Coleman	Mayhem; Walter "Babi Luv" Stewart^{[a]}	5:03
11.	"Icing on the Cake"	Hamilton; Coleman; Derrick Kirkland	Mayhem; DK^{[a]}	4:49
12.	"Exclusively"	Hamilton; Sparks; Coomes; Jimane Nelson; Feemster	Sparks	6:39

Notes

- ^{^[a]} signifies an additional producer

Sample credits

- "Love Is So Complicated" contains elements and a sample of "Midnight Groove" by Love Unlimited Orchestra.

== Charts ==
=== Weekly charts ===
Chart (2005)	Peak position
US Billboard 200	12
US Top R&B/Hip-Hop Albums (Billboard)	4

=== Year-end charts ===
Chart (2005)	Position
US Top R&B/Hip-Hop Albums (Billboard)	90

== Release history ==
Region	Date	Label	Ref.
Germany	June 20, 2005	Warner	
United Kingdom	June 27, 2005	Rhino	
Canada	June 28, 2005	Atlantic; Rhino	
United States	June 28, 2005	Atlantic; Rhino	
Australia	July 26, 2005	Warner	
