= My Soul (Leela James album) =

Studio album by Leela James
- Released: May 25, 2010
- Length: 39:43
- Label: Stax
- Producers: Leela James (also exec.); Malik Albert; Gerrard Baker; Carvin & Ivan; Kadis & Sean; Ray Murray; Chucky Thompson; Steve "Supe" White

Leela James chronology
Let's Do It Again (2009)	My Soul (2010)	Loving You More... In the Spirit of Etta James (2012)

My Soul is the third studio album by American soul singer-songwriter Leela James. It was released by Stax Records on May 25, 2010, in the United States, marking James' debut with the label. Her highest-charting effort to date, the album debuted and peaked at number 7 on Billboard's Top R&B/Hip-Hop Albums chart and at number 37 on the US Billboard 200 chart.

== Critical reception ==
Professional ratings
Review scores
Source	Rating
About.com	4/5 stars
All About Jazz	3.5/5 stars
AllMusic	4/5 stars
The Dallas Morning News	A
PopMatters	5/10

AllMusic editor Andy Kellman praised My Soul as James' strongest album to that point, highlighting its stronger material, balance of classic and contemporary sounds, and her growth as a songwriter. Billboard critic Gail Mitchell praised the album's "gritty, soulfully booming" vocals and James' return to original material, highlighting tracks such as "I Ain't New to This," "The Fact Is," and "Tell Me You Love Me." Mario Tarradell from The Dallas Morning News gave My Soul an A grade, praising James' powerful vocals, songwriting, and soulful style. Tarradell highlighted "I Want It All," "Let It Roll," and "I Ain't New to This" as standout tracks.

About.com's Mark Edward Nero gave My Soul four stars, praising its raw soul sound, live instrumentation, and James' powerful performances on tracks including "Mr. Incredible, Ms. Unforgettable," "I Want It All," and "So Cold." Writing for All About Jazz, Ernest Barteldes praised the album's energetic performances and blend of classic soul influences with a contemporary approach. PopMatters critic David Maine gave a mixed review, praising James' vocals while criticizing some production choices and songwriting inconsistencies.

== Commercial performance ==
My Soul became James' highest-charting album, a position it still holds to date, peaking at number 37 on the US Billboard 200 and number 7 on the Top R&B/Hip-Hop Albums chart. It marked her first album to reach the top ten on the latter.

== Track listing ==
Credits adapted from the liner notes of My Soul.

No.	Title	Writer(s)	Producer(s)	Length
1.	"I Ain't New to This"	Leela James; Billy Earl Kennedy; Gus McKinney	Gerrard Baker	2:30
2.	"So Cold"	James	Kadis & Sean	3:43
3.	"The Fact Is"	James; Billy Brown; Al Goodman; Sylvia Robinson	Steven "Supe" White	4:08
4.	"I Want It All"	James	Ray Murray; Malik Albert	3:33
5.	"Party All Night"	James	Chucky Thompson	4:03
6.	"Mr. Incredible – Ms. Unforgettable" (featuring Raheem DeVaughn)	James; DeVaughn	Thompson	3:18
7.	"Tell Me You Love Me"	James; John D. Loudermilk; Andrea Martin; Gordon Williams	Baker	3:30
8.	"Let It Roll"	James	Thompson	2:44
9.	"Supa Luva"	Gerald Craig Glanville; Shelby Johnson	Butter	4:52
10.	"If It's Wrong"	James; Carvin "Ransum" Haggins	Carvin & Ivan	3:21
11.	"It's Over"	James; Sammy Friedman; William "Mickey" Stevenson	Carvin & Ivan	3:27

Sample credits

- "I Ain't New To This" contains a sample of "Solitary Love Affair", performed by Millie Jackson.
- "The Fact Is" contains a sample of "Lovely Way She Loves", performed by The Moments
- "Tell Me You Love Me" contains a sample from "Then You Can Tell Me Goodbye", performed by The Manhattans.
- "It's Over" contains a sample of "Can't Be Alone", performed by Hodges, James & Smith.

== Personnel ==
- Anabel DeHaven – Make–Up, Stylist
- Kyonte Vincent – Engineer
- Al Manerson – Executive Producer
- Dwayne Moore – Bass
- Shelby Johnson – Composer, Vocals (Background)
- Milton Fletcher Jr. – Keyboards
- Michael Gassel – Package Design
- Sammy Friedman – Composer
- Gus McKinney – Composer
- Gerrard Baker – Producer
- Gerald Craig Glanville – Composer
- Carvin Haggins – Composer
- Carl "Chucky" Thompson – Producer
- Bud Wales – Sax (Tenor)
- Brenda Walkin – Sax (Tenor)
- Billy Earl Kennedy – Composer
- Barry Wilson – Sax (Baritone)
- Andrea Martin – Composer, Vocals (Background)
- Sylvia Robinson – Composer
- William "Mickey" Stevenson – Composer
- Gordon Williams – Composer, Engineer
- Paul Blakemore – Mastering
- Deborah Mannis–Gardner – Sample Clearance
- Billy Brown – Composer
- Mary Hogan – A&R
- Eric "Ebo" Butler – Engineer
- Tiffany Wilson – Vocals (Background)
- Ray Murray – Producer, Engineer
- Malik Albert – Producer, Engineer
- Ivan "Orthodox" Barias – Producer, Engineer
- Carvin "Ransum" Haggins – Producer, Engineer
- Seth Presant – Mixing
- Raheem DeVaughn – Composer, Vocals (Background), Vocals
- Steve "Supe" White – Producer, Engineer
- Johnnie "Smurf" Smith – Keyboards
- Leela James – Arranger, Composer, Vocals (Background), Additional Production, Executive Producer, Vocals
- George "Spanky" McCurdy – Drums
- Devin DeHaven – Photography
- Ben Wendel – Sax (Tenor)
- Kadis – Producer, Engineer
- Larissa Collins – Art Direction
- Mark Bowers – Bass, Guitar
- Al Goodman – Composer
- Chris Dunn – Executive Producer
- John D. Loudermilk – Composer

== Charts ==
Chart (2010)	Peak position
US Billboard 200	37
US Top R&B/Hip-Hop Albums (Billboard)	7
