= Ain't Nobody Worryin' =

Studio album by Anthony Hamilton
- Released: December 13, 2005
- Recorded: 2004–2005
- Studio: Reflection Sound, Charlotte, North Carolina (Note: Tracks 1–3, 6, 10 and 11); Westlake, West Hollywood, California (Note: Track 9; additional recording on tracks 1 and 2); Blakeslee Recording Company, North Hollywood, California (Note: Track 4); Studio 609, Philadelphia (Note: Track 5); WoodaWorx Productions, Huntsville, Alabama (Note: Tracks 7 and 12); Axis, Philadelphia (Note: Track 8); Allustrious, New York City (Note: Track 9)
- Genre: R&B; soul; neo soul
- Length: 53:41
- Label: So So Def; Zomba
- Producer: Mark Batson; Vidal Davis; Anthony Hamilton; Andre Harris; Jake and the Phatman; Christopher "Wurldwyde" Pottinger; James Poyser; Raphael Saadiq; Ahmir "Questlove" Thompson; Kelvin Wooten

Anthony Hamilton chronology
Soulife (2005)	Ain't Nobody Worryin' (2005)	Southern Comfort (2007)

Singles from Ain't Nobody Worryin'
- 1. "Can't Let Go" Released: October 17, 2005; 2. "Sista Big Bones" Released: August 7, 2006; 3. "Pass Me Over (airplay only)"

Professional ratings
Review scores
Source	Rating
AllMusic	4.5/5 stars
Blender	3/5 stars
Robert Christgau	(1-star Honorable Mention)
Entertainment Weekly	B+
Los Angeles Times	3/4 stars
The New York Times	Favorable
Newsday	B+
PopMatters	9/10
Stylus Magazine	B+
Vibe	4/5 stars
The Village Voice	Favorable

Ain't Nobody Worryin' is the third studio album by the American singer Anthony Hamilton. It was released on December 13, 2005, by So So Def Recordings and Zomba. It debuted at number 19 on the Billboard 200 and at number four on the Top R&B/Hip-Hop Albums chart, selling 112,000 copies in its first week. It was certified gold by the Recording Industry Association of America (RIAA) on April 4, 2006, and, by March 2006, it had sold 350,000 copies in the United States.

== Track listing ==
No.	Title	Writer(s)	Producer(s)	Length
1.	"Where Did It Go Wrong?"	Anthony Hamilton; Mark Batson	Batson	3:28
2.	"Southern Stuff"	Hamilton; Batson	Batson	3:59
3.	"Can't Let Go"	Hamilton; Batson	Batson	3:52
4.	"Ain't Nobody Worryin'"	Hamilton; Raphael Saadiq; Bobby Ozuna	Saadiq; Jake and the Phatman^{[a]}	3:41
5.	"The Truth"	Hamilton; Andre Harris; Vidal Davis	Harris; Davis	4:35
6.	"Preacher's Daughter" (featuring Tarsha' McMillian)	Hamilton; Chris Pottinger; David Balfour	Christopher "Wurldwyde" Pottinger; Hamilton^{[a]}	5:24
7.	"Pass Me Over"	Hamilton; Kelvin Wooten	Wooten	6:40
8.	"Everybody"	Hamilton; James Poyser	Poyser	4:11
9.	"Sista Big Bones"	Hamilton; Batson	Batson	4:00
10.	"Change Your World"	Hamilton; Poyser; Ahmir Thompson	Poyser; Ahmir "Questlove" Thompson^{[a]}	4:40
11.	"Never Love Again"	Hamilton; Wooten	Wooten	4:39
12.	"I Know What Love's All About"	Hamilton; Wooten	Wooten; Hamilton^{[a]}	4:32

Japanese edition bonus track
No.	Title	Writer(s)	Length
13.	"Beautiful Wonderful"	Hamilton; Will Solomon

Notes

- ^{^[a]} signifies a co-producer

== Charts ==
=== Weekly charts ===
Chart (2005–06)	Peak position
UK Albums (OCC)	190
UK R&B Albums (OCC)	14
US Billboard 200	19
US Top R&B/Hip-Hop Albums (Billboard)	4

=== Year-end charts ===
Chart (2006)	Position
US Billboard 200	131
US Top R&B/Hip-Hop Albums (Billboard)	16

== Certifications ==
Region	Certification	Certified units/sales
United States (RIAA)	Gold	500,000^{^}
^{^} Shipments figures based on certification alone.

== Release history ==
Region	Date	Label	Ref.
Canada	December 13, 2005	Sony	
United States	December 13, 2005	So So Def; Zomba	
United Kingdom	December 19, 2005	Arista	
Japan	January 25, 2006	BMG	
Australia	February 3, 2006	Sony BMG	
Germany	February 3, 2006	Sony BMG	
