= Comin' from Where I'm From =

Studio album by Anthony Hamilton
- Released: September 23, 2003
- Recorded: 2002–2003
- Studios: Southside, Atlanta (Note: Track 1); Axis, Philadelphia (Note: Tracks 2, 9 and 12); Allustrious, New York City (Note: Tracks 3, 4 and 6); CedSolo Productions, New Rochelle, New York (Note: Track 5); Cherokee, Los Angeles (Note: Tracks 7, 8, 10 and 11); The Studio, Philadelphia (Note: Track 9)
- Genres: R&B; neo soul
- Length: 52:05
- Labels: So So Def; Arista
- Producers: Mark Batson; Junius Bervine; Jermaine Dupri; Anthony Hamilton; James Poyser; Cedric Solomon

Anthony Hamilton chronology
XTC (1996)	Comin' from Where I'm From (2003)	Soulife (2005)

Singles from Comin' from Where I'm From
- 1. "Comin' from Where I'm From" Released: October 14, 2003; 2. "Charlene" Released: August 3, 2004

Professional ratings
Review scores
Source	Rating
AllMusic	4.5/5 stars
Blender	3/5 stars
Robert Christgau	(1-star Honorable Mention)
Entertainment Weekly	B+
The New York Times	Favorable
PopMatters	9/10
Rolling Stone	2/5 stars
USA Today	3/4 stars
Village Voice	Favorable
The Washington Post	Favorable)
Yahoo! Music	Favorable

Comin' from Where I'm From is the debut studio album by American singer Anthony Hamilton. It was released on September 23, 2003, by So So Def Recordings and Arista Records. The album debuted at number 33 on the US Billboard 200 with first-week sales of 33,000 copies, while peaking at number six on the Top R&B/Hip-Hop Albums chart. Comin' from Where I'm From was certified platinum certification by the Recording Industry Association of America (RIAA) on December 2, 2004, and as of December 2005, it had sold 1.2 million copies in the United States.

The album's second single, "Charlene", peaked at number 19 on the Billboard Hot 100 and at number five on the Hot R&B/Hip-Hop Songs chart, becoming Hamilton's most successful single to date. The album earned Hamilton three Grammy Award nominations in 2004—Best Traditional R&B Vocal Performance, Best R&B Song (both for the title track), and Best Contemporary R&B Album—and one in 2005—Best Male R&B Vocal Performance for "Charlene". British DJ Ben Pearce sampled vocals from the song "Cornbread, Fish & Collard Greens" for his 2013 song "What I Might Do".

== Track listing ==
No.	Title	Writer(s)	Producer(s)	Length
1.	"Mama Knew Love"	Anthony Hamilton; Shawn Carter; Al Green	Jermaine Dupri	3:28
2.	"Cornbread, Fish & Collard Greens"	Hamilton; James Poyser; Diedra Artist	Poyser	4:33
3.	"Since I Seen't You"	Hamilton; Mark Batson; Maya Jones	Batson	3:15
4.	"Charlene"	Hamilton; Batson	Batson	4:06
5.	"I'm a Mess"	Hamilton; Cedric Solomon; Jeanine Smith	Solomon	4:24
6.	"Comin' from Where I'm From"	Hamilton; Batson	Batson	4:00
7.	"Better Days"	Hamilton; Erick Coomes; David Balfour	Hamilton	3:02
8.	"Lucille"	Hamilton; E. Coomes; Tyler Coomes; Balfour; Roger Bowling; Hal Bynum	Hamilton	4:28
9.	"Float"	Hamilton; Junius Bervine	Bervine	5:41
10.	"My First Love" (featuring LaToiya Williams)	Hamilton	Hamilton	6:14
11.	"Chyna Black"	Hamilton	Hamilton	3:59
12.	"I Tried"	Hamilton; Poyser	Poyser	5:02

Japanese edition bonus track
No.	Title	Writer(s)	Producer(s)	Length
13.	"Comin' from Where I'm From" (rap version; featuring Scarface and Jermaine Dupri)	Hamilton; Batson	Batson	4:37

Sample credits

- "Mama Knew Love" contains samples from "Blueprint (Momma Loves Me)" by Jay-Z and "Free at Last" by Al Green.
- "Lucille" contains re-sung lyrics from "Lucille", written by Roger Bowling and Hal Bynum.

== Charts ==
=== Weekly charts ===
Chart (2003)	Peak position
US Billboard 200	33
US Top R&B/Hip-Hop Albums (Billboard)	6

=== Year-end charts ===
Chart (2003)	Position
US Top R&B/Hip-Hop Albums (Billboard)	75
Chart (2004)	Position
US Billboard 200	99
US Top R&B/Hip-Hop Albums (Billboard)	10
Chart (2005)	Position
US Top R&B/Hip-Hop Albums (Billboard)	61

== Certifications ==
Region	Certification	Certified units/sales
United States (RIAA)	Platinum	1,200,000

== Release history ==
Region	Date	Label	Ref.
United States	September 23, 2003	So So Def; Arista	
Germany	October 20, 2003	BMG	
Australia	November 12, 2003	BMG	
Japan	January 25, 2004	BMG	
United Kingdom	January 26, 2004	Arista	
