= Anthony Hamilton (singer) =

American singer (born 1971)

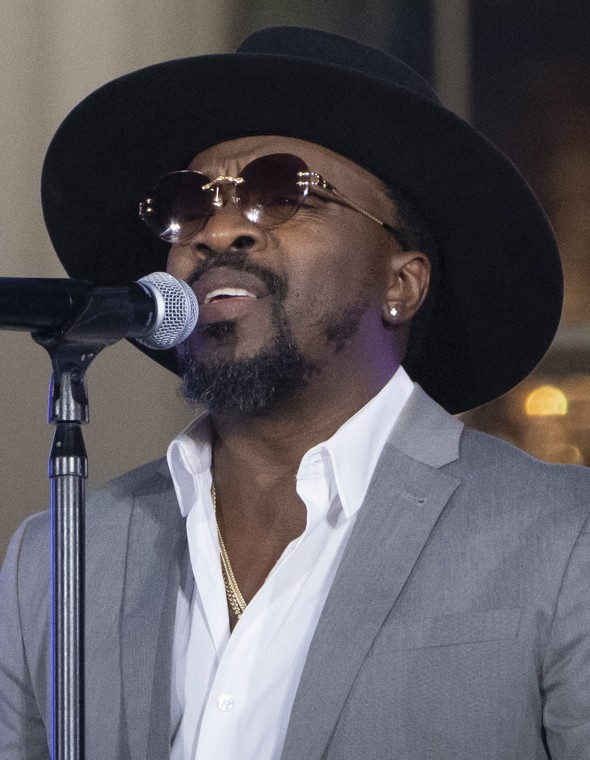
- Hamilton in 2024

Background information
- Born: Anthony Cornelius Hamilton; January 28, 1971 (age 55); Charlotte, North Carolina, U.S.
- Genres: R&B; neo soul
- Occupations: Singer; songwriter; record producer
- Works: Anthony Hamilton discography
- Years active: 1992–present
- Labels: Uptown; MCA; So So Def; Arista; Jive; Zomba; RCA; Atlantic; Soul Life Entertainment Holdings, Inc.
- Formerly of: The Soultronics
- Spouse: Tarsha McMillan (m. 2005; div. 2015)
- Website: www.anthonyhamilton.com

Anthony Cornelius Hamilton (born January 28, 1971) is an American singer. Hailing from Charlotte, North Carolina, he signed with Uptown Records, an imprint of MCA Records to record his debut studio album XTC; scheduled for release in 1996, it was ultimately shelved due to its singles failing to chart. He then gained recognition for his guest performance on Nappy Roots' 2002 single "Po' Folks", which peaked at number 21 on the Billboard Hot 100 and led him to sign with Jermaine Dupri's So So Def Recordings, an imprint of Arista Records.

Hamilton's second studio album, Comin' from Where I'm From (2003) received platinum certification by the Recording Industry Association of America (RIAA), earned four Grammy Award nominations, and spawned the 2004 single "Charlene", which peaked at number 19 on the Billboard Hot 100. His third and fourth albums, Ain't Nobody Worryin' (2005) and The Point of It All (2008), both peaked within the top 20 of the Billboard 200 and received gold certifications by the RIAA. He then parted ways with So So Def in favor of RCA Records to release his fifth and sixth albums, Back to Love (2011) and What I'm Feelin' (2016).

Hamilton has won a Grammy Award from 12 nominations, and is also known for his song "Freedom" (with Elayna Boynton), which he co-wrote and performed for the soundtrack album to the 2012 film Django Unchained.

== Career ==
A Charlotte native, Hamilton began singing in his church's choir at age 17. He attended South Mecklenburg High School, where he performed as part of in their award-winning choir directed by Mark Setzer. In 1992, he met producer Mark Sparks, who encouraged Hamilton to leave Charlotte and head to New York City, where he signed with Andre Harrell's Uptown Records. In 1996, he recorded the album XTC for MCA Records, which has remained unreleased.

Hamilton co-wrote the 1999 hit "U Know What's Up" for singer Donell Jones. In 2000, he joined soul singer D'Angelo's international tour in promotion of the Voodoo album, where he featured as a backup singer.

=== Nappy Roots ===
Hamilton was first introduced to mainstream audiences with after performing the chorus to Nappy Roots 2002 single "Po' Folks", which earned a Grammy Award nomination for "Best Rap/Sung Collaboration" in 2003. "Po' Folks" is the second single from the debut album, Watermelon, Chicken & Gritz (2002). Hamilton further collaborated with Nappy Roots on their songs the songs "Sick & Tired", "Push On", and "Organic" from their second studio album for Atlantic Records: Wooden Leather (2003); he also guest performed on the lead single—"Down N' Out"—to their third album, The Humdinger (2008). Nappy Roots and Hamilton both guest performed on Mark Ronson's 2003 song "Bluegrass Stain'd" from the latter's album Here Comes the Fuzz.

=== 2002–present ===
Hamilton made a guest appearances on Tupac Shakur's posthumous album Better Dayz (2002)—on the album's second disc version of "Thugz Mansion".

In 2003 he released his debut album Comin' From Where I'm From that featured the hit single "Charlene".

He guest featured on Jadakiss' 2004 single "Why", which peaked at number 11 on the Billboard Hot 100 and received a Grammy Award nomination for Best Rap/Sung Collaboration.

After MCA had failed to give XTC proper release, Hamilton signed with the Chris Dawley's Soulife Records. In the period 1999 to 2001, prior to his 2003 official debut, Hamilton's first compilation album, Soulife was released in June 2005 and was composed of songs recorded . After the record company went bankrupt the recording were shelved. Arista asked Hamilton to revisited the material and with parts re-recorded, a selection was released as Soulife in June 2005. Ain't Nobody Worryin', his third studio album, was released on December 13, 2005 and received gold certification by the Recording Industry Association of America (RIAA).

Hamilton guest appeared on a song from the RH Factor's 2003 album Hard Groove—"Kwah/Home". He appeared on Angie Stone's "Stay For A While" in 2004. He made a guest appearance on blues singer-guitarist Buddy Guy's 2005 album Bring 'Em In, contributing vocals to a cover version of Bob Dylan's 1969 "Lay Lady Lay", which featured Robert Randolph.

At the 2006 BET Awards, Hamilton won the BET J "Cool Like That" Award. Comedian Dave Chappelle had Hamilton as a musical guest on his show Chappelle's Show in episode 6, Season 2 that premiered on Comedy Central. In later 2006, he guest performed on Tupac Shakur's "Dear Mama (Frank Nitty Remix)". He made a guest appearance on the UPN show All of Us in Season 2. Hamilton made a cameo as a soul singer in the film American Gangster, to whose soundtrack he contributed. During the 2008 BET Awards, Hamilton performed Al Green's "Tired of Being Alone" during a tribute to Green's career. Later in 2008, he was featured on Jeezy's album The Recession, which peaked atop the Billboard 200.

In July 2011, Jill Scott released her single "So In Love" featuring Hamilton. The song spent 19 weeks at number one on the Urban adult contemporary charts. In 2012, Hamilton made guest appearances two successful releases for Def Jam Recordings artists: Big K.R.I.T.'s Live from the Underground and Life Is Good by Nas, the latter of which debuted atop the Billboard 200. Hamilton also co-performed on the soundtrack to Quentin Tarantino's Django Unchained with his the song "Freedom", a duet with soul singer Elayna Boynton. British DJ Ben Pearce sampled vocals from Hamilton's song, "Cornbread, Fish & Collard Greens" in his 2013 song, "What I Might Do".

In February 2015, Hamilton made a cameo appearance on the television series Empire, where he performed "Point of It All" as part of main character Luscious Lyon's proposal to his girlfriend. The episode aired February 4, 2015. In August 2015, Hamilton made a guest appearance on the song "That One", the first single from Teedra Moses' second album Cognac & Conversation.

On February 24, 2016, Hamilton performed at the last "In Performance at the White House" hosted by President Barack Obama and First Lady Michelle as part of a tribute to singer Ray Charles. On March 25, he released his sixth album What I'm Feelin (2016), which he describes as an "emotional" cleanse reflecting on some of the hurdles he has faced. The album features guitarists Gary Clark, Jr. and Vince Gill, and songs produced by Mark Batson, Salaam Remi, and James Poyser, among others. Hamilton worked with the background singers the HamilTones, who often perform soul renditions of hip hop tracks. That same month, Hamilton partnered with Cracker Barrel Old Country to release a deluxe version of the album sold online and in their stores. On March 28, 2016, Hamilton performed on NPR's critically acclaimed Tiny Desk Concerts, where he performed his the singles "Amen", "Best of Me", "Cool", and "Charlene". Chris Brown recruited Hamilton to perform on the "Legends" remix of his single "Back to Sleep", which was released on April 10, 2016. On April 21, 2016, Hamilton embarked on a nationwide tour with Fantasia.

In 2017, Hamilton co-performed on the song "Carnival" for the virtual band Gorillaz from their fifth album Humanz. On May 15, 2020, Hamilton released the single "Back Together" featuring Rick James through Hamilton's label My Music Box, in partnership with BMG. The song was co-written by Hamilton and Ed D. Kane, and produced by 9th Wonder. It served as the lead single from his seventh album, Love Is the New Black, released on September 24, 2021.

On August 28, 2025, Hamilton and actor Omari Hardwick released the collaborative album Pages, a mixture of spoken word poetry and melody.

== Personal life ==
Hamilton has six sons.

Dating since 2003, he married his background singer Tarsha McMillan in 2005. On November 2, 2010, Hamilton and his wife Tarsha welcomed twin boys. On his official Facebook page on June 11, 2012, Hamilton announced the birth of another son. The couple announced on June 20, 2015, after 10 years of marriage, that they were getting a divorce.

== Discography ==
Studio albums

- XTC (1996)
- Comin' from Where I'm From (2003)
- Ain't Nobody Worryin' (2005)
- The Point of It All (2008)
- Back to Love (2011)
- Home for the Holidays (2014)
- What I'm Feelin' (2016)
- Love Is the New Black (2021)
- Pages (with Omari Hardwick) (2025)

== Awards and nominations ==
BET Awards

Year	Nominee / work	Award	Result
2004	Anthony Hamilton	Best New Artist	Nominated
2004	Anthony Hamilton	Best Male R&B Artist	Nominated
2005	Anthony Hamilton	Best Male R&B Artist	Nominated
2005	"Why" (with Jadakiss)	Best Collaboration	Nominated
2006	Anthony Hamilton	BET J Cool Like Dat Award	Won
2006	Anthony Hamilton	Best Male R&B Artist	Nominated

Critic's Choice Movie Awards

Year	Nominee / work	Award	Result
2007	"Do You Feel Me"	Best Song	Nominated

Grammy Awards

Year	Nominee / work	Award	Result
2004	"Comin' from Where I'm From"	Best Traditional R&B Performance	Nominated
2004	"Comin' from Where I'm From"	Best R&B Song	Nominated
2004	"Comin' from Where I'm From"	Best Contemporary R&B Album	Nominated
2005	"Charlene"	Best Male R&B Vocal Performance	Nominated
2009	"You've Got The Love I Need" (with Al Green)	Best Traditional R&B Performance	Won
2010	"Soul Music"	Best Traditional R&B Performance	Nominated
2010	"The Point Of It All"	Best Male R&B Vocal Performance	Nominated
2010	"The Point Of It All"	Best R&B Album	Nominated
2013	"Back To Love"	Best R&B Album	Nominated
2013	"Pray For Me"	Best R&B Song	Nominated
2014	"Best of Me"	Best R&B Song	Nominated
2017	"What I'm Feelin' (featuring The HamilTones)"	Best Traditional R&B Performance	Nominated

NAACP Image Awards

Year	Nominee / work	Award	Result
2004	Anthony Hamilton	Outstanding New Artist	Nominated
2005	Anthony Hamilton	Outstanding Male Artist	Nominated
2005	"Charlene"	Outstanding Song	Nominated

2022

MOBO Awards

Year	Nominee / work	Award	Result
2006	Himself	Best Reggae	Nominated

Soul Train Music Awards

Year	Nominee / work	Award	Result
2004	"Comin' From Where I'm From"	Favorite Male R&B/Soul Single	Nominated
2004	Comin' From Where I'm From	Favorite Male R&B/Soul Album	Nominated
2005	"Charlene"	Favorite Male R&B/Soul Single	Nominated
2006	Soulife	Favorite Male R&B/Soul Album	Nominated
