= Soul Train Music Award for Best Rap Album =

Annual US music award

This page lists the winners and nominees for the Soul Train Music Award for Best Rap Album. The award was first given out during the 1989 ceremony, before being retired in 1996.

== Winners and nominees ==
Winners are listed first and highlighted in bold.

=== 1980s ===
Year	Artist	Album	Ref
1989
1989	**DJ Jazzy Jeff and the Fresh Prince**	**He's the DJ, I'm the Rapper**	
1989	Rob Base and DJ E-Z Rock	It Takes Two	
1989	Public Enemy	It Takes a Nation of Millions to Hold Us Back	
1989	Salt-N-Pepa	A Salt with a Deadly Pepa	

=== 1990s ===
Year	Artist	Album	Ref
1990
1990	**Heavy D and the Boyz**	**Big Tyme**	
1990	Big Daddy Kane	It's a Big Daddy Thing	
1990	De La Soul	3 Feet High and Rising	
1990	Young MC	Stone Cold Rhymin'	
1991
1991	**MC Hammer**	**Please Hammer Don't Hurt 'Em**	
1991	Ice Cube	Amerikkka's Most Wanted	
1991	LL Cool J	Mama Said Knock You Out	
1991	Public Enemy	Fear of a Black Planet	
1992
1992	**Public Enemy**	**Apocalypse '91**	
1992	Geto Boys	We Can't Be Stopped	
1992	Heavy D and the Boyz	Peaceful Journey	
1992	Naughty by Nature	Naughty by Nature	
1993
1993	**Arrested Development**	**3 Years, 5 Months and 2 Days in the Life Of...**	
1993	Das EFX	Dead Serious	
1993	Father MC	Close to You	
1993	Kris Kross	Totally Krossed Out	
1994
1994	**Onyx**	**Bacdafucup**	
1994	Arrested Development	Unplugged	
1994	Digable Planets	Reachin' (A New Refutation of Time and Space)	
1994	Naughty by Nature	19 Naughty III	
1995
1995	**Snoop Doggy Dogg**	**Doggystyle**	
1995	Bone Thugs-N-Harmony	Creepin on ah Come Up	
1995	Scarface	The Diary	
1995	Warren G	Regulate...G Funk Era	
1996
1996	**2Pac**	**Me Against The World**	
1996	Bone Thugs-N-Harmony	E. 1999 Eternal	
1996	Coolio	Gangsta's Paradise	
1996	Method Man	Tical	
