= Good Morning (Kanye West song) =

Song by Kanye West

from the album Graduation
- Released: September 11, 2007
- Recorded: 2006–2007
- Studio: Sony Music (New York); Record Plant (Hollywood)
- Genre: Hip hop
- Length: 3:15: 3:01 (video version)
- Label: Roc-A-Fella; Def Jam
- Songwriters: Kanye West; Elton John; Bernie Taupin
- Producer: Kanye West

Music video
- "Good Morning" on YouTube

"Good Morning" is the first song from American hip hop recording artist and record producer Kanye West's third studio album Graduation (2007). The song was produced by West and contains samples from the recording "Someone Saved My Life Tonight" by English singer and pianist Elton John. As the opening track, the song serves as an introduction to the musical and lyrical themes of the album. West establishes the academic narrative of it, celebrating his graduation in the realm of hip hop and rapping about his skepticism of higher education over thumping, off-kilter boom bap drums.

The composition of "Good Morning" is both light and dark in tone and retains keyboard-laden, electronic instrumentation in addition to being imbued with poignant introspection. The song's atmospheric hip hop production harbors a subdued measure of progressiveness as West incorporates New-Age and ambient elements. His pensive verses are largely built on self-aggrandizing undercut with self-criticism and explore lyrical concerns pertaining to anti-establishment. The song's lyrics express motivational declarations of triumph and contain numerous pop-culture references.

"Good Morning" received generally favorable reviews from contemporary music critics, who praised its production as well as West's wordplay. West performed the song as the opener of the set-list on his worldwide Glow in the Dark Tour (2008). In the years since its release, the song has been covered and remixed by a variety of hip hop artists, record producers and musical groups.

Though not released as a single, an animated music video was produced for "Good Morning". The video was produced by Japanese animation studio OLM and directed by Japanese contemporary artist Takashi Murakami, who had designed the album artwork of Graduation and the cover art for the album's singles. The surrealistic visuals of the video take influences from Japanese anime and utilises cel-shaded animation. The narrative is centered around West's anthropomorphic teddy bear mascot Dropout Bear. He overcomes various obstacles while racing through a futuristic city in an effort to reach his college campus in time for his graduation ceremony. The short animated feature was released to widespread critical acclaim and is often cited as one of West's most artistic music videos. It was included in the 'best-of' lists of publications such as Billboard and Complex, and has been showcased in multiple art museums.

== Background ==
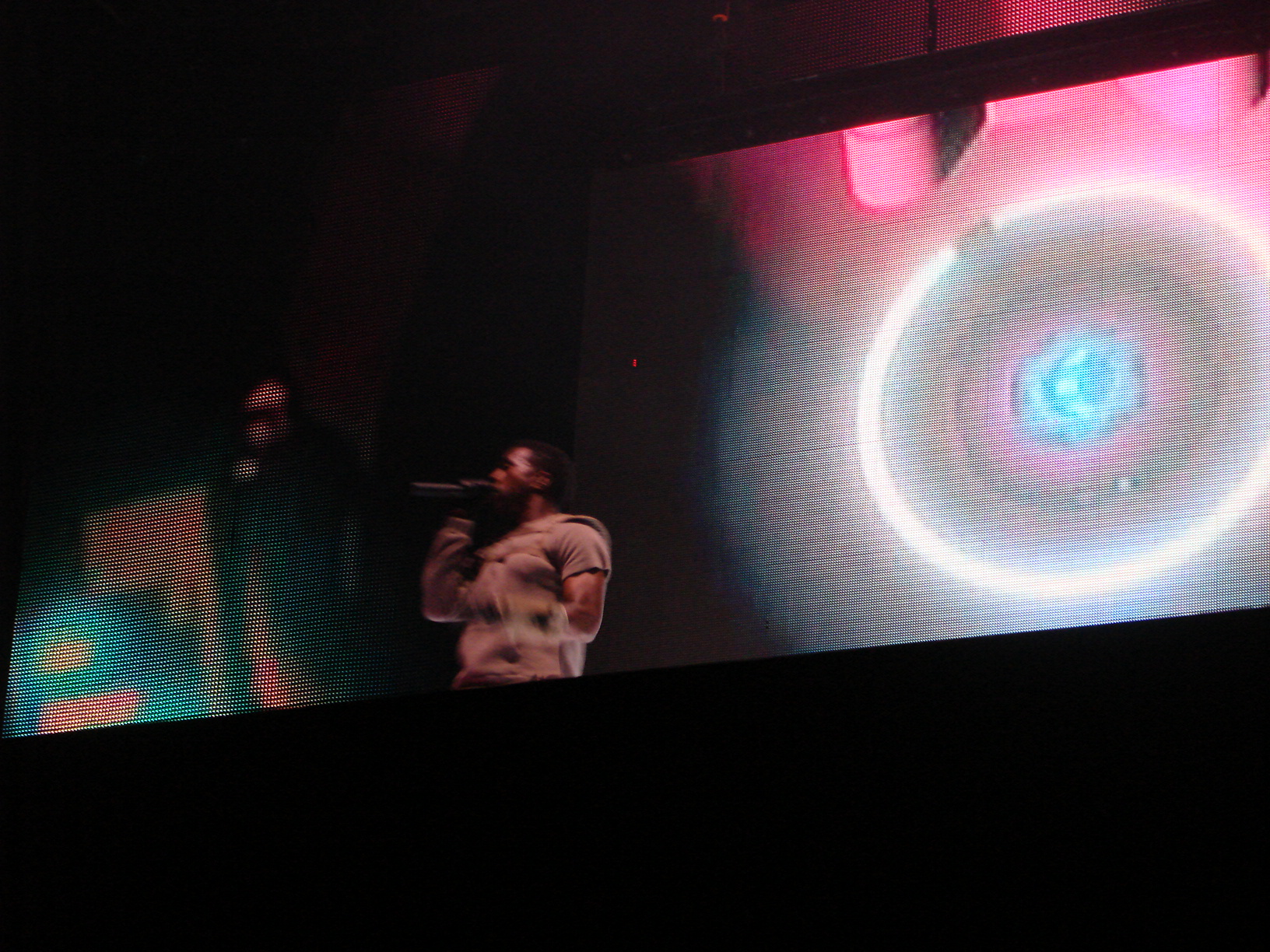
West performing "Good Morning" in Rio de Janeiro, Brazil on October 24, 2008, during the Glow in the Dark Tour

"Good Morning" was written and produced by West. Due to being the album's introductory track, the song's original title was "Good Morning (Intro)," but subsequently was changed. Unlike its predecessors, rather than a fake Bernie Mac intro or a Broke-Phi-Broke skit, the album-opener instead begins with vocals from West. Along with West's usage of the vocal samples, one of the most distinctive aspects of the production for "Good Morning" is the significant emphasis on electronics. The opening track signals his progression towards a more electronic soundscape.

The song contains samples from the recording "Someone Saved My Life Tonight" by English singer and pianist Elton John. Incidentally, John had professed a desire to work with West during a Rolling Stone interview on August 25, 2006. John imparted that with the assistance from an artist such as West or Pharrell Williams, both of whom he tremendously respects, he wanted to bring his songs and melodies to hip hop beats. It was while he was discussing his forthcoming autobiographical studio album The Captain & the Kid (2006). Being a concept album, it acts as the sequel to his ninth album Captain Fantastic and the Brown Dirt Cowboy (1975), which contains the song that West samples. Years later, the two artists officially collaborated with one another on West's fifth studio album My Beautiful Dark Twisted Fantasy (2010), which John described as "genius." John played the piano and was one of many in a long roster of recording artists who provided background vocals for the fifth track "All of the Lights".

"Good Morning" was first heard by music listeners when the digital radio station BBC Radio 1Xtra hosted an exclusive "Audience With Kanye West" venue at the BBC Radio Music Theatre in London on August 13, 2007. West guided a specially selected audience through Graduation, playing the album in its entirety directly from his MacBook Air laptop via a speaker system. The premiere was part of an extensive promotional campaign that West embarked on for his third album during a trip to the United Kingdom. Two weeks later, "Good Morning" was played as an opener when West hosted an album listening session for Graduation in New York City. The late-night album listening session was held at the New World Stages on August 28, 2007. Inside an auditorium, West explained the influences and aspirations that went into the making of his third album. Throughout the night, he played previews of its songs from start-to-finish without interruption, some with video accompaniment to match. When West played "Good Morning," scenes from the film 2001: A Space Odyssey were broadcast on a screen while lights flashed in sequence with the thumping beat of the track.

== Recording ==
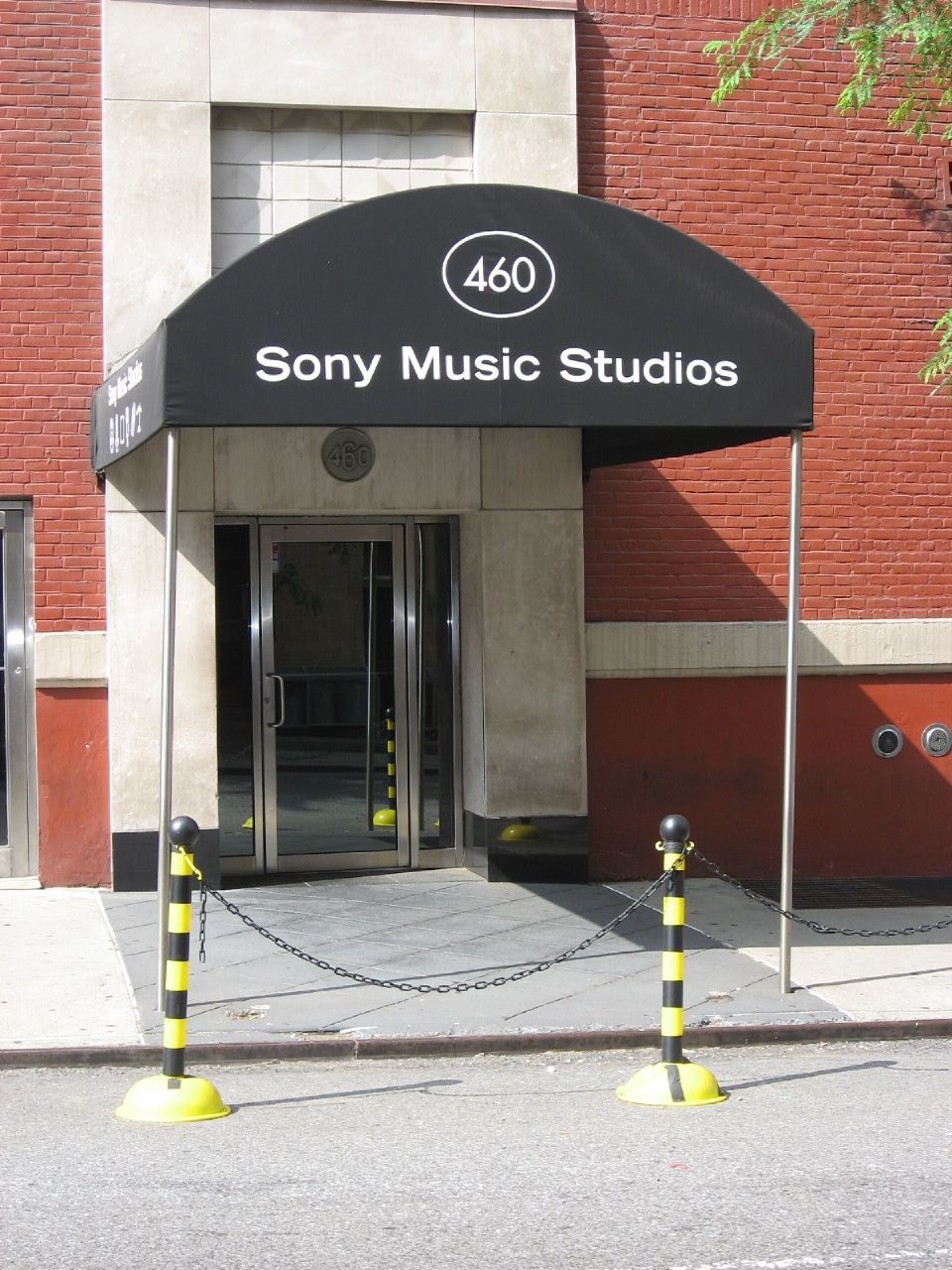
Sony Music Studios, in New York City was one of the recording studios where "Good Morning" was recorded.

"Good Morning" was the first track that West started working on for Graduation. Recording sessions primarily took place at Sony Music Studios in New York City and at The Record Plant in Hollywood, California. The track was then mixed at the Chalice Recording Studios in Hollywood, California. According to former GOOD Music recording artist Tony Williams, West first booked a studio in Detroit, Michigan to begin working on the recording in February 2006. He was in Detroit to perform for a pre-game concert held during VH1's Pepsi Smash Super Bowl Bash festivities of Super Bowl XL, when the Seattle Seahawks played against the Pittsburgh Steelers.

Beginning in early 2006, West had overseen the recording and production of Graduation simultaneously with Finding Forever (2007), the seventh studio album of his close friend, fellow Chicago hip hop artist and label affiliate Common. As a result, there was significant overlap in between the studio sessions for the two records. Common was helpful in facilitating the composing process, as West producing songs for his album would sometimes either lead to the making of hip-hop beats or inspire creative ideas which were applied towards his own project. "Good Morning" was a case of the latter in regards to its programmed drums. The track's murky, slightly off-kilter drum-machine beat that West crafted aligns with the J Dilla methodology he channeled and maintained throughout Finding Forever in tribute to the recent passing of the underground hip hop producer. West's newfound fascination with house-music also played a role on his approach to drum programming. He relied more on clipped electro tones for his rhythmic patterns, giving the drum beats more of a punch. In contrast to Finding Forever, West set aside his trademark soul samples in favor of airy synthesizer tones that would carry well when performed in arenas.

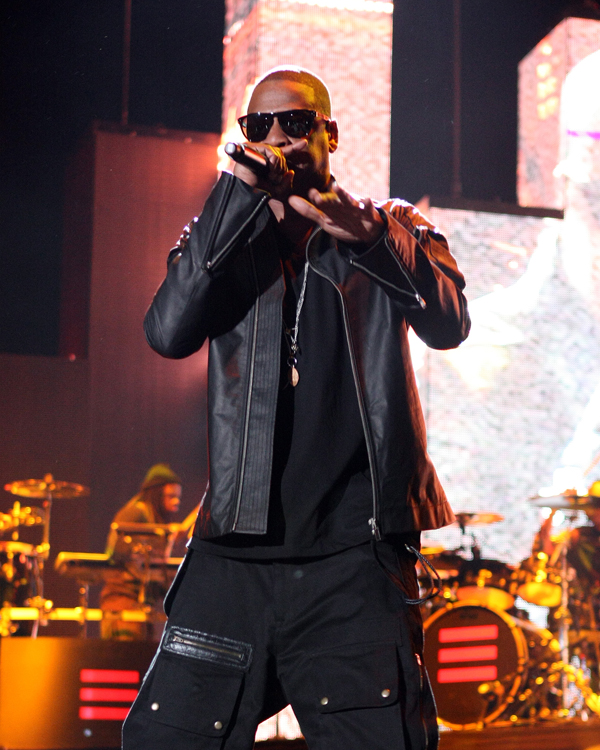
"Good Morning" concludes with additional vocals that are provided by American rapper Jay-Z.

Like most of the material throughout his third album, West's songwriting on "Good Morning" is characterized by confessional storytelling and simplified lyricism. West shortened his lines for each verse in order to more directly get his lyrical concerns across. As for his rapping, after touring with and studying the live performances of European arena rock bands such as U2 and the Rolling Stones, West decided to simplify some of his rhymes due to not always being able to rock crowds with complex lyrics. He opted for a less intricate lyrical delivery featuring lines built on anthemic sloganeering with a more universal context. This would work in combination with sing-along hooks that tens of thousands of fans could chant in unison at his stadium concerts.

"Good Morning" contains additional vocals provided by Australian singer Connie Mitchell of the dance music group Sneaky Sound System, as well as soul singer Tony Williams. West had Connie Mitchell and Tony Williams sing a descending vocal line together over the looped sample. Their celestial unison singing and the floating monophonic vocal loop combine to form a warm background harmony. The oohing vocals from the ethereal backing choir function as a hook which serves to further engender moody atmosphere.

The song also includes an interpolation of vocals that were provided by rapper Jay-Z which are spliced into the song's outro. During the closing refrain, Jay-Z briefly recites a line from "The Ruler's Back", the rapper's own opening track for his album, The Blueprint. Similar to Finding Forever, the album's record production had been handled primarily by West. West altered the rhythm of the phrase by omitting a word in order to place more emphasis on the beat. In an interview with Entertainment Weekly, Jay-Z detailed some backstory in regards to his small contribution. From a creative stance, West was apparently quite enthusiastic about the incorporation of his a capella into the track. Jay-Z explained, "You have to really care about the music ... [Kanye] was bragging about having the a capella. He's like, 'Yo, that's how I spun it, 'cause I had the a capella.' I'm like, wow! The things he cares about! That's not a big thing, but in his mind, 'I had the a capella, so I was able to put that in there without any drums.'" Although he does provide the additional vocals, Graduation marks the first studio album released by West not to feature a full-length guest rap verse from Jay-Z.

== Composition ==
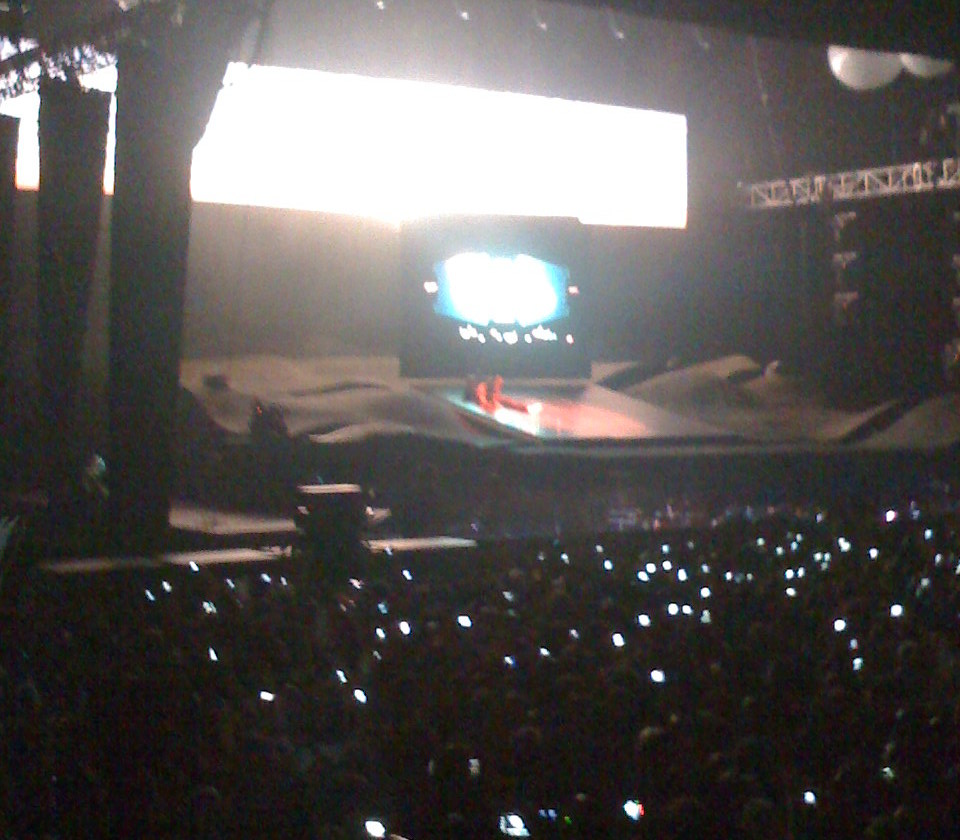
The ambient song begins the album on a sparse, downbeat note. West's songwriting is structured on the usage of anthemic sloganeering and wafting hooks intended for crowds of fans to chant and sing along to during his live concerts.

"Good Morning" is an uptempo hip hop track that lasts for a duration of three minutes and 15 seconds. The song's musical and lyrical content is both light and dark in tone. It harbors an atmosphere that is sunny and largely optimistic, but also wary and sentimental. The progressive hip hop song contains elements of electronic and ambient music as well as New-Age keyboards. It has a minimal and downbeat electronic instrumentation which consists of keyboards, muted drums, and background vocals. "Good Morning" begins when West utters controlled "uh" grunts before he unleashes the track's thumping, off-kilter boom bap drums. The song's opening section then initiates an static backbeat derived from echoed-out cowbell hits. Its steady, metronomic cowbell beats punctuate the subversive, trembling bass drum rhythm and generate an insistent laid-back groove. The main accompaniment comes in the form of enigmatic, organ-like electric piano keys layered with a resounding, high-pitched electronic synth-drone.

After its sparse introduction, the building arrangement abruptly becomes awash in layers of keyboards at the arrival of the atmospheric refrain. "Good Morning" is simplistic in its gentle chorus, where West repeats the title of the track four times. Following each repetition of the titular phrase are haunting choral chants which are in turn accented by subtle instrumental fills. The echoing synth line from the introduction is accompanied by dreamy synth-chords. The song's hook retains wafting vocal harmonies composed with the use of wordless falsetto vocal samples from the recording "Someone Saved My Life Tonight" by Elton John. West's style of rapping is slick and keenly aggressive during the three eight-bar verses. His straightforward lyrical delivery exhibits a slow-paced, less technical approach to flow. After its third verse, "Good Morning" elevates itself from a refrain to an outro that features the voice of Jay-Z. He utters lyrics from the opening lines of "The Ruler's Back". The musical composition reaches its conclusion with the pairing of Jay-Z's additional vocals to synthesizer parts.

"Good Morning"
A 19-second sample of West rapping the song's second verse. His terse lines come backed by echoed, metronomic cowbell beats and thumping bass drum layered with airy synth tones. West's pensive lyricism express motivational declarations of triumph. During the refrain, its ambient track takes on New-Age keyboards and a dreamy hook which employs wafting vocal harmonies.

Lyrically, "Good Morning" is a triumphant declaration of professional and financial achievement. It continues the education theme which was established by his previous studio albums The College Dropout (2004) and Late Registration (2005). Both of the first two installments of West's planned album tetralogy began with an introductory track that involves a school administrator who labels him a disappointment. By contrast, "Good Morning" starts off the third studio album with West graduating to the next level of success and proceeding towards the next phase of his career. Accordingly, West uses the album-opener of Graduation to deliver an anthemic commencement address. He announces that his record functions as a dissertation, making an analogy in which he likens his music to academia. West compares overcoming life's hindrances to finishing a university most directly when he professes that, "You graduate when you make it up out of the streets."

While primarily an uplifting anthem, West's lyrics are ouroboric in nature, being structured on self-aggrandisement undercut with harsh self-criticism. They suggest that every new success or achievement gives him more new reasons to doubt himself. His conflicted, confessional lyricism and delivery is emphasized by way of the disarmingly simple, easygoing quality of the track's beat. The song's pensive verses discuss lyrical concerns related to anti-elitism and anti-establishment. West critiques societal hierarchies produced by the homogenization of the American education system. Alongside motivational declarations of triumph, the lyrics of "Good Morning" are home to energetic, amusing word play laced with numerous pop-culture references. They pertain to actress Rosie Perez, the 1989 Spike Lee film Do the Right Thing, civil rights leader Malcolm X, and the classic 1980s science-fiction film series Back to the Future. West lays bear the forward-thinking theme of the album and critiques his peers when he rhymes, "Good Morning, look at the valedictorian/scared of the future while I hop in the DeLorean." The song also includes an interpolation of the line, "Hustlers, that's if you're still livin', get on down..." from Jay-Z's 2001 album The Blueprint.

== Critical reception ==
"Good Morning" was met with generally favorable reviews from contemporary music critics. John Wash for Hot Press called the musical composition "glorious." He elaborates that the track's "dark, neurotic beats may form the backdrop, but the deliciously cheesy sampling lifts the song firmly into the pop spectrum." Entertainment Weeklys Isabella Biedenharn noted, "the smooth, sublime 'Good Morning' is just so fresh and untethered — it's Kanye living in a pure, creative dream-space." Natalie Weiner from Billboard has named "Good Morning" as one of West's most uplifting anthems, saying, "The Elton John sample, combined with Kanye's anti-establishment fervor, will make anyone feel better about their relative lack of diplomas." RapReview's Jesa Padania also considered "Good Morning" to be a strong way to start the studio album and expressed affinity for the song's simple yet soulful hip-hop beat. Chase Hoffberger from The Austin Chronicle gave praise to the innovative manner in which West samples Elton John for the record production. The Observer staff writer Ben Thompson listed "Good Morning" as one of the top five songs from Graduation.

The Michigan Daily writer Brian Chen claimed the recording "stands among the best of West's productions, combining gospel howls, synthesizers and strings, all over a bone-crushing bass." Sound & Vision reviewer Jeff Perlah viewed "Good Morning" as a demonstration of how West "continues to bounce hip-hop into exciting new realms that are artful." Rajveer Kathwadia of RWD Magazine cited the track as one of the best songs on Graduation. Although he withholds the belief that it's West's musicality that's a true measurement of his talent, Kathwadia nevertheless commended his improvement as a rapper and marked the Malcolm X lyric as the album's standout line. Likewise, Rolling Stone writer Evan Serpick called the Malcolm X reference a "classic one-liner." Dave Heaton from PopMatters also highlighted West's clever word play, musing, "Bad puns have been the foundation of West's lyrical approach since the beginning, and it works." In a less enthusiastic review, Japie Stoppelenburg of No Ripcord described "Good Morning" as a "concise but slightly blunt effort." Stoppelenburg goes on to say "the track is innocuous and respectably fun, but it never really steps out of its modesty like so many of Kanye's earlier tracks have." In a retrospective article, Brendan Klinkenberg for Complex encapsulated the opening track:

"... 'Good Morning' is [West's] cleanest opener, on his cleanest album; the perfect first step to what would be the capstone to the College trilogy, and the last time he would privilege cohesiveness in his catalogue. In his words, Graduation is his dissertation, and its first track is its thesis. 'Ye would take over the world, watch it crumble around him, then get more artistically daring with each subsequent release—Good Ass Job would never show up, and he would abandon the things that make this song great: it's focused, three-verse structure, gently building beat, and sweet sense of melancholy. 'Ye would go on to burn his influences and talent down for scraps, and began to create weirder, bigger things. One thing he never lost, though, was his ability to start an album."

=== Accolades ===
A columnist from Paste bestowed "Good Morning" with much acclaim and ranked it as West's 60th best album track. He declared, "'Good Morning' isn't West just waking himself up to the next level of his evolution, it's West waking up the world to its next legend." Pigeons & Planes placed the opener at number 12 under their list of West's 25 best songs that weren't released as singles. Consequence of Sound listed it at number 18 among their top 20 West songs. To summarize the track's concept, editor Jeremy Larson wrote, "The morning of the commencement, a new day for 'Ye, the processional, the intro. It's all there in "Good Morning," the first taste of what would be the blasted synths and huge sound of Graduation. Jake Boyer of Highsnobiety cited "Good Morning" as the sixth best song on Graduation and West's 28th best overall, writing, "Whether it's facing the sort of life-changing event like the graduation of its lyrics or easing yourself out of a particularly rough patch, this song is here, a healing salve for all wounds." He remarked that the track's sonic cues "[make] good on Kanye's narrative catharsis. Somehow, through all the bullshit, we made it to graduation day, and yes, it sounds this damn triumphant." Portland rapper Aminé, who cites West as a musical influence, stated that the track is one of his favorite songs. He imparted, "'Good Morning' was a song that just made me feel good and I could still turn it on today. It was one of the first times where I started to hear bright, positive, hip-hop." XXL named "Good Morning" one of the 25 best Hip-Hop album intro's of the 21st century in 2019.

== Music video ==
=== Development ===
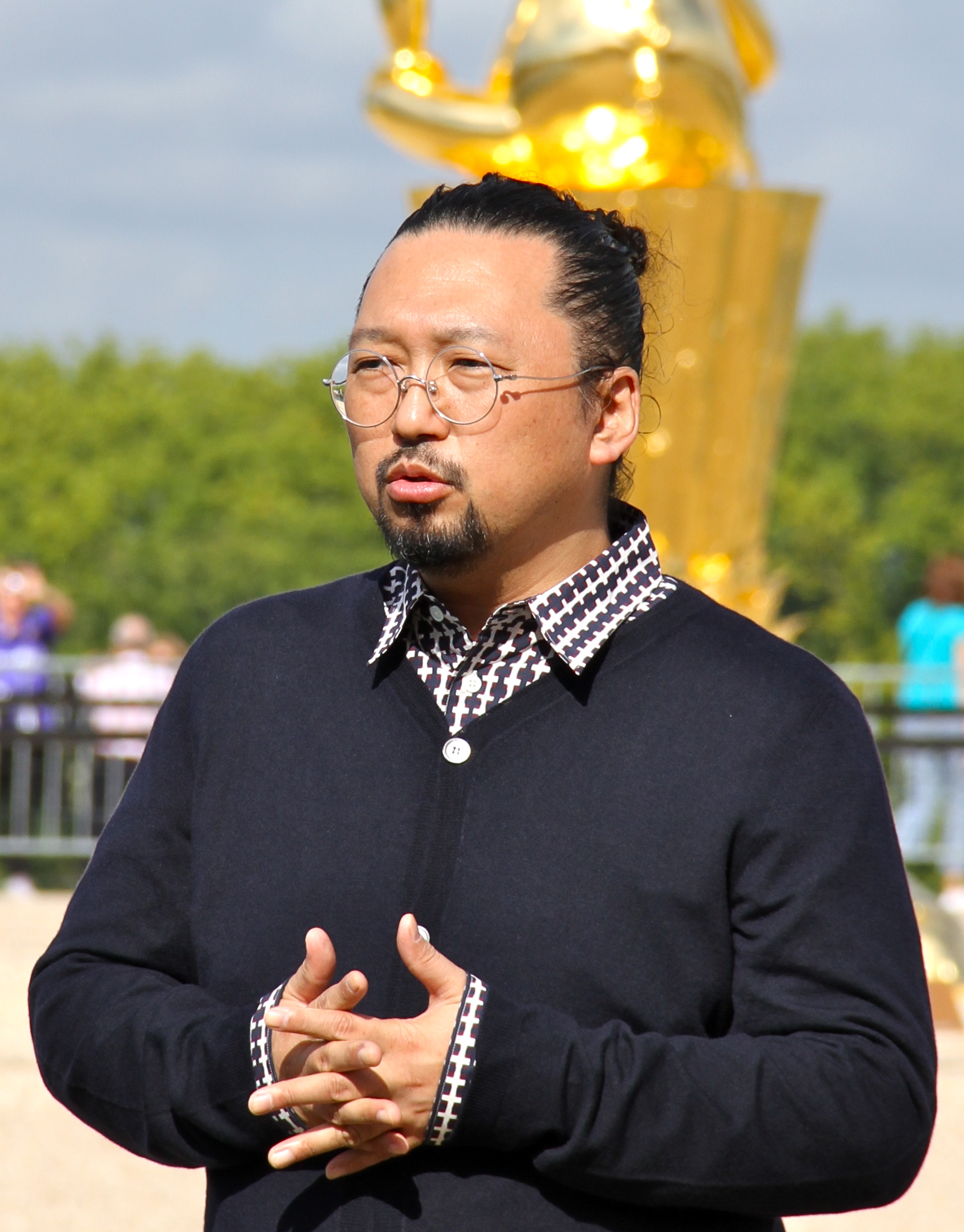
Japanese contemporary artist Takashi Murakami, who designed the cover artwork for Graduation and its singles, directed the music video.

Even though it was not released as a single, a three-minute animated music video was produced for "Good Morning". West commissioned the video to be directed by Japanese contemporary artist Takashi Murakami. He had been enlisted by West to oversee the art direction of Graduation and was behind the cover art designs for the album and its accompanying singles. The collaboration first came about when West visited Murakami's Kaikai Kiki Co. studio in Roppongi Hills during a brief trip to Tokyo, Japan in the midst of touring the year prior. Regarding his joint collaboration with the artist, West remarked, "Murakami, his work has been stunning to me because pop art is really expressive, representative and expressive and emotional, and it looks like something you can do yourself. [But] you cannot do no Murakami shit yourself. You cannot do this at home. He has this studio out in Japan that has 30 artists working at one time. I love Japanese culture and I was always into art, and Murakami is a god in the art world."

The short animated feature expresses glossy, colorful pastel imagery that take cues from Superflat, a post-modern art movement influenced by Japanese manga and anime which was founded by Murakami. Often called "the Warhol of Japan," Murakami's surrealistic visual art is characterized by cartoonish creatures which appear friendly and cheerful at first glance, but possess dark, twisted undertones. The artistic concept involves a fantastic, grotesque and sometimes dark universe of creatures like "Mr. Dob," "Smiley-Face Flowers," and colorful mushrooms. The three-dimensional art technique blends artistry with Japanese anime and launched Murakami to fame in the 1990s. It also attracted the attention of Marc Jacobs, creative director of Louis Vuitton, who recruited Muramki to revise the traditional LV monogram brand logo for their line of handbags and accessories. The commercially successful venture paved the way for Murakami's artwork to cross over into commerce and other mediums, propelling him into an internationally recognized artist.

For the music video, the technicolor album artwork that Murakami designed for Graduation are brought to life through the use of cel-shaded animation. Its narrative also contains numerous visual and thematic references to the sci-fi film Back to the Future. The video was produced by Murakami's production and artist-management company Kaikai Kiki Co., Ltd. in conjunction with Oriental Light and Magic. The latter Japanese studio was responsible for the 3D animation of the Pokémon film franchise as well as the 2001 feature-length anime film, Inuyasha the Movie: Affections Touching Across Time. Meanwhile, the storyline of the music video was written by West, himself a self-professed anime fan. An edited version of the video was first displayed in an F.Y.E. commercial used for promotion of Graduation days before the album's release date. A clip of the animated music video was leaked onto the Internet on November 12, 2007. The music video found its way online by means through a fan's camera after a private screening at the Geffen Contemporary in the Little Tokyo district of Los Angeles, California. West made the full version of the music video available on the iTunes Store on August 25, 2008.

=== Synopsis ===
A screenshot of Dropout Bear as he arrives at the college campus in time for his graduation ceremony in the anime-influenced music video, which features the use of cel-shaded animation.

The narrative of the music video centers around Dropout Bear, West's anthropomorphic teddy bear mascot. Dropout Bear first appeared sitting forlornly on an empty set of gymnasium bleachers wearing baggy jeans and a corduroy jacket on the cover art for his debut album, The College Dropout. He later appeared dressed in a collegian outfit—a blazer with a school insignia—on the album cover of West's sophomore release, Late Registration. In the surrealistic video, Dropout Bear acts as the main protagonist while his journey takes place throughout a fictional futuristic metropolis known as Universe City. Dropout Bear contends with a variety of unfortunate setbacks and overcomes a series of trials and tribulations as he races through the city in an effort to reach his college campus in time to attend his graduation ceremony.

The story begins on a rainy day with Dropout Bear being woken up by his alarm clock. The album artwork for Graduation, upon which this video is animated from, is seen on a poster behind his bed. Upon realizing that he's late, Dropout Bear jumps out of bed, brushes his teeth, dons a varsity jacket and runs out of his apartment to his car, which is modeled after a DMC DeLorean. When the car's engine dies, Dropout Bear is forced to find an alternative means of transportation. At first, he attempts to hail a taxi cab but it speeds right past him, soaking him with puddle water. He then tries to get aboard a metro rail but just misses it, slamming his face into the door of a subway car right before it pulls away.

As he races down sidewalks, Dropout Bear is chased down by a monstrous storm cloud that swallows him whole. He is then transported to a bizarre pocket dimension populated by multi-eyed, living, technicolor mushrooms. Dropout Bear evades lightning bolts and a tornado before falling through a hole and being regurgitated by the storm cloud monster back onto the city streets. At that moment, the raining ceases and the sky clears, revealing a bright, shining sun. Dropout Bear then dons a pair of Venetian Blind shades, having reached the campus of his university. He makes it to his ceremony just in time to stand before his colleagues, a wide variety of anthropomorphic creatures like himself. Dropout Bear sheds his attire to reveal a graduation robe and academic cap and receives his bachelor's degree in hip-hop music from an elderly rabbit. After he accepts his diploma, which reads "Kanye West", the visual narrative comes to a conclusion with Dropout Bear being blasted out of a cannon. He is shot from the university, through the heavens and beyond the stratosphere into space as depicted on the back cover of Graduation. Dropout Bear is last seen riding off into another galaxy with a few of his classmates in the flying DeLorean. The song titles from the Graduation album are seen as they fly past.

=== Reception ===
Upon its official release, the "Good Morning" music video reached number-one on the iTunes Store music video chart in the United States just a day later. The short animated feature was met with universal acclaim from fans, critics and media outlets and is often regarded as one of West's best, most artistic videos. Adam Itkoff from The Source complimented the video, stating that West's visual collaboration with Murakami is a testament to the way that his imagination can catalyze illustrious pieces of art. Writing for MSN Music, writer Sam Greszes remarked, "Not only is the song itself great, but the video for "Good Morning" is a technicolor dreamscape full of 3D flair." The Ringer praised the music video for "Good Morning" as West's best music video of all time. Complex magazine cited the animated feature as West's 18th best music video, saying, "Murakami's art is incredible from a still viewpoint, but when presented in the form of his few full-length cartoon features, it practically explodes off the screen." Comparing it to the recent release of West's puppet-themed music video for "Champion," Peter Gicas of E! Online was somewhat wary of the animated short, writing, "Yes, the creativity in both these cases is admirable, especially this latest effort ... It all just makes us a little nervous, though. After all, it's OK for hip-hop stars to show their softer side, but it can also be taken a bit too far." Regina Cho of Vibe found parallels between that of West and the film's protagonists. She explained that:

While many may attribute Kanye's fascination with the film to his similarities with Marty, he also possesses an extremely Doc Brown-like quality—a frenetic nature that prompts him to bounce outrageous ideas around that have the people around him in initial disbelief, but his out-of-the-box propositions often came into fruition as ingenious works of art that were far ahead of their time ... Kanye is notoriously known for making a whole lot of last-minute decisions that will either make or break the anticipated outcome, similar to how Doc Brown's sudden assertions dictated whether or not someone would just stay stuck 30 years in the past forever.

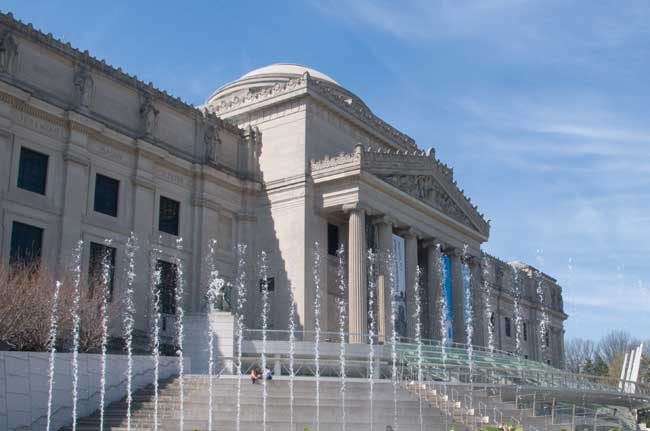
The animated feature became one of the few music videos ever to be showcased in multiple art museums, such as the Brooklyn Museum which is located in New York City.

On November 11, 2013, the animated music video was included on Pop Art: 13 Awesome Artist-Musician Collaborations, a catalog compiled by Billboard. The publication lists joint ventures that have taken place between acclaimed visual artists and chart-topping musicians over the past decades. Billboard cited West's work with Murakami, which consists of the making of the video in addition to the creation of the album's artwork, as being among 13 pairings in the realms of music and high-art that are amazing moments in true art-pop. Under the same premise, writer Jennifer Wood of Complex magazine ranked Murakami's direction of the music video for "Good Morning" at the eighth position for their list of The 10 Best Art and Music Collaborations of All Time. In honor of his achievement of the Michael Jackson Video Vanguard Award at the 2015 MTV Video Music Awards, women's fashion magazine Harper's Bazaar compiled a list of West's nine most essential music videos. The video for "Good Morning" was at number eight on the list, with columnist Madeline Kelly declaring that West is worthy of the recognition and there's no denying his talent. Sharing similar sentiments, MTV staff writer Adam Fleischer placed "Good Morning" at number 14 on the list of West's top 25 most innovative videos.

For his contribution, Murakami has benefited significantly from the artistic collaboration with West. Even though his monogram project with the fashion house Louis Vuitton had brought him international mainstream attention five years earlier, Murakami acknowledges the fact that many of the millennial youth who have gravitated towards his work learned about him through his joint efforts with musicians such as West and Pharrell Williams. They opened up his contemporary artistry to a new generation of young music listeners. According to Spin editor Jeremy Larson, West's collaboration with Murakami for the "Good Morning" music video also struck a chord with Murakami's audience as conflating art and commerce. The short animated feature has since become one of the few music videos ever to be showcased in several prestigious art museums, including the Brooklyn Museum in New York City and the Museum of Contemporary Art in Los Angeles, California.

=== Video clip ===
In addition to the animated music video, a special video clip was created for "Good Morning" prior to the release of Graduation. It was displayed for the very first time as an opener when West hosted a late-night album listening session for Graduation in New York City at the New World Stages on August 28, 2007. West presented the gapless playback session inside an auditorium with an evocative light-show across a stage that featured theatrical smoke machines, laser beams, stage spotlights and other special effects. The elaborate spectacle was synchronized with the music. While the music played, a large screen positioned in the middle of the stage flashed a montage of imagery edited to sync up with "Good Morning". They were scenes taken from the 1968 science fiction film 2001: A Space Odyssey. Similarly with the audio track, West went for a minimalist aesthetic in regards to the sequence of visual cues. The video clip for "Good Morning" was one of seven that were designed by West and Derrick Lee exclusively for the event. Derrick Lee was the editor of the music video for "Flashing Lights" and was able to edit all seven video clips in the span of three days. West later made the video clip available for viewing on his official blog on March 20, 2008.

== Live performances ==
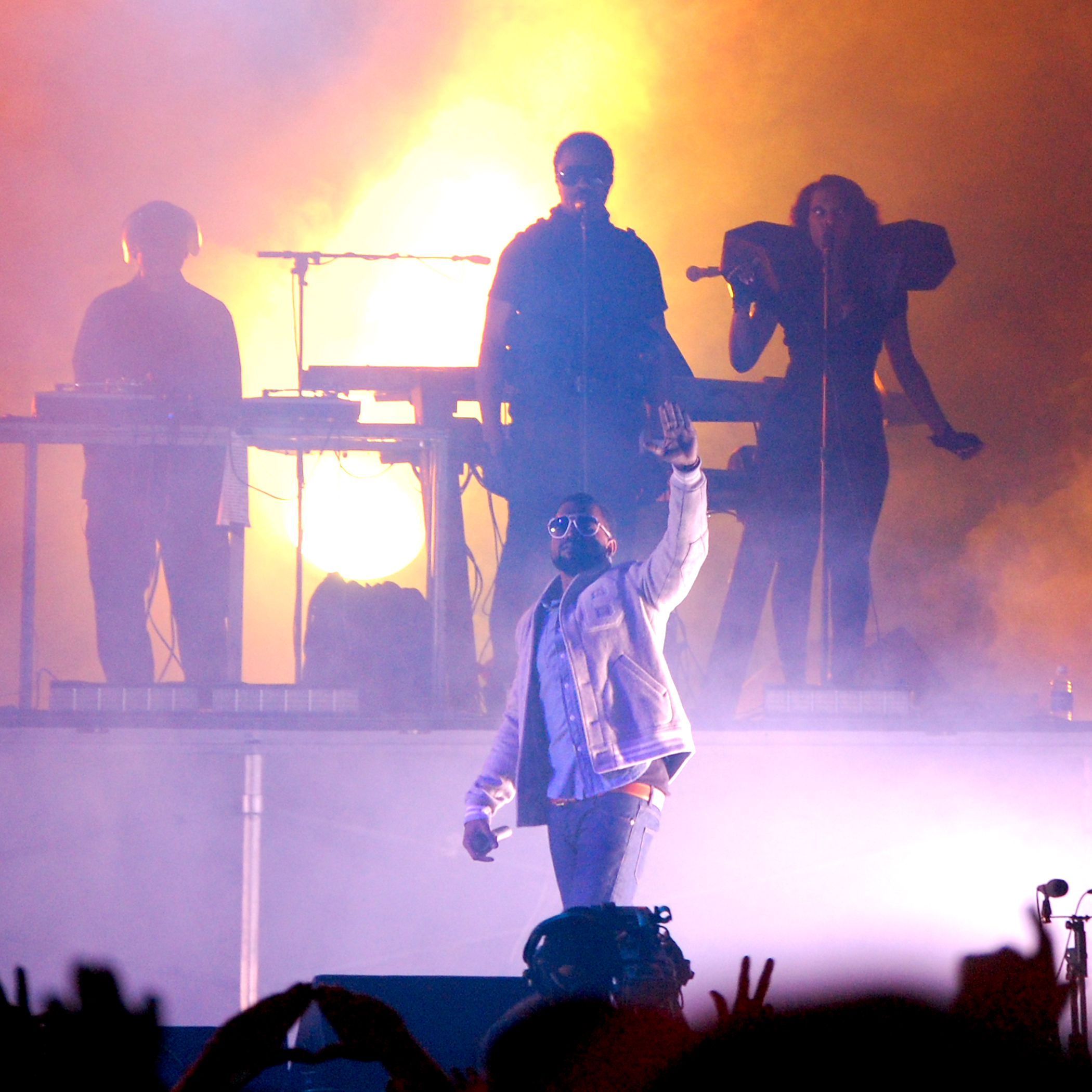
West often performed "Good Morning" as the opener of his concerts, including at his headlining appearance at the Virgin Mobile Festival in 2008.

On April 4, 2008, West gave a live performance of "Good Morning" during a six-song setlist at the Brooklyn Museum in New York City. The concert was held in celebration of the opening of the "© MURAKAMI" exhibit by Takashi Murakami. The comprehensive retrospective features over 90 Murakami pieces and artwork that draw from street culture, high-art and traditional Japanese painting, and includes painting, drawings, sculpture, wallpaper, installation and animation. West took to the small stage surrounded by smoke and flashing lights below a large screen emblazoned with Murikami's artwork to perform before a mostly older audience. The very next day, West opened his concert for the World Wide Bape Heads Show during Springroove 2008 at Makuhari Messe in Chiba, Japan with "Good Morning". His live performance was interwoven with visual elements and the setlist centered around songs from Graduation.

West performed "Good Morning" every single night as the opener of the set-list of his Glow in the Dark Tour, which began on April 16, 2008, at the KeyArena in Seattle, Washington. West would often begin his elaborate concerts by playing a discordant leitmotif of "Stronger," implying that he'd start the show with a performance of the hit single, only to segue into a live rendition of "Good Morning". The composition is but one of the many, various songs taken from West's first three studio albums that West utilisises for his conceptual concert. In the narrative, West does a live performance of "Good Morning" once he wakes up from hyper-sleep to find himself stranded. After conversing with the disembodied female voice of an onboard computerter named Jane, West performs on a barren, tilted, moonlit stage shrouded in smoke before a large LED screen that depicts scenes from the science fiction film 2001: A Space Odyssey. He wore jeans, a sweater with one missing sleeve, shoulder pads and a red windbreaker tied around his waist.

Near the end of the tour's North American leg, with singers and a percussionist/DJ behind him, West performed "Good Morning" during the final night of Lollapalooza on August 3, 2008, in his hometown of Chicago, where he co-headlined the festival with Nine Inch Nails. West provided a live rendition of "Good Morning" during his headlining performance at Virgin Mobile Festival in Baltimore, Maryland on August 10, 2008. Much like his Lollapalooza appearance in Chicago the weekend prior, West and Nine Inch Nails were both scheduled as headliners on different stages at the same time at opposite ends of the park. At the start of the concert, following a brief instrumental, West walked onstage and started performing the song. West was alone on the stage engulfed in smoke and fog in front of a live musical band and background vocalists who added percussive textures and harmony to the track.

== Cover versions and remixes ==
"Good Morning" has been covered and remixed by other hip hop artists, record producers and musical groups. Vitamin String Quartet composed a string-laden cover version of "Good Morning" for the opening song of their tribute album, The String Quartet Tribute to Kanye West. In a similar composition, Rockabye Baby! featured an interpretation of "Good Morning" as the opening track of their tribute album, Rockabye Baby! Lullaby Renditions of Kanye West. Intended for infants, the soothing rendition is a wordless lullaby instrumental, substituting keyboards and drums in favor of xylophones and bells. The rendition was later featured on Good Day, Goodnight, their five-year anniversary 2-CD compilation release. The compilation album contains the most requested songs from their previous releases, including "Good Morning," in addition to several exclusive new tracks.

Virginia hip hop duo Clipse used the instrumental of "Good Morning" and included the track on their 2008 mixtape We Got It 4 Cheap, Volume 3. Kelefa Sanneh from The New York Times praised Malice and Pusha T for delivering, "almost nothing but witty, well-made stanzas." Likewise, Pitchfork reviewer Ryan Dombal described their song as a "well-chosen introspective pick." A remix for "Good Morning" was produced by The Kickdrums for inclusion on Sky High, a remix mixtape that was mixed and compiled by DJ Benzi and Plain Pat. The mixtape features remixes by various DJs and record producers of songs taken from West's first three studio albums. It was made in anticipation of the release of his fourth studio album 808s & Heartbreak (2008). The remix project was commissioned by West himself the year prior. He handed over a cappellas and other session tapes to DJ Benzi, who then spent his time trying to match different and DJs and producers to certain tracks. Like every of the other tracks, "Good Morning" (The Kickdrums Remix) had at least five revisions recorded before being completely finished. The song's refrain contains guitar-driven production in addition to melancholic crooning. The remix also features a guest verse from then-newly signed GOOD Music recording artist Big Sean.

Speech of the alternative hip hop group Arrested Development lyrically references "Good Morning" in the opening lines of "Any Tree But That" on their sixth studio album, Strong (2010). The song was the source of inspiration for the beat and chorus of "Hoodmorning" by Compton rapper The Game. Named after the rapper's signature Twitter phrase, "Hoodmorning" was produced by in-house record producer Mars and The Game released it as the opening track of his twelfth mixtape, Hoodmorning (No Typo): Candy Coronas. Hosted by DJ Skee, the mixtape was made in promotion of the repeatedly delayed release of his fourth studio album The R.E.D. Album (2011). On July 28, 2011, DJ Skee made available an exclusive preview trailer for the mixtape on YouTube. The trailer briefly displays The Game rapping in a recording booth and DJ Skee at his laptop before a mixing console inside the control room of a studio decked with bottles of Corona Extra as "Hoodmorning" plays in the background. Hip hop artist Evidence has used samples of the drums from "Good Morning" to produce the instrumental track "Good Evening". It was for his fourth instrumental hip hop album Green Tape Instrumentals (2013).

== Personnel ==
Information taken from Graduation liner notes.

- Kanye West – production
- Jay-Z – additional vocals
- Tony "Penafire" Williams – additional vocals
- Connie Mitchell – additional vocals
- Andy Chatterley – keyboards
- Andrew Dawson – recording
- Anthony Kilhoffer – recording, mix engineer
- Bram Tobey – assistant mix engineer
- Jason Agel – assistant mix engineer
- Nate Hertweck – assistant mix engineer
- Matty Green – assistant mix engineer

== Certifications ==
Certifications for "Good Morning"
Region	Certification	Certified units/sales
New Zealand (RMNZ)	Gold	15,000^{‡}
United Kingdom (BPI)	Gold	400,000^{‡}
United States (RIAA)	2× Platinum	2,000,000^{‡}
^{‡} Sales+streaming figures based on certification alone.

== Bibliography ==
- Bailey, Julius (2014). The Cultural Impact of Kanye West. Palgrave Macmillan. ISBN 978-1-137-57425-1.
- Beaumont, Mark (2015). Kanye West: God & Monster. London, England: Omnibus Press. ISBN 9781783233946.
- Graves, Kirk Walker (2010). Kanye West's My Beautiful Dark Twisted Fantasy. A&C Black. ISBN 978-1-6235-6542-8.
