= 1993 Soul Train Music Awards =

Music awards ceremony in Los Angeles, US

Soul Train Music Awards
- Date: March 9, 1993
- Location: Shrine Auditorium, Los Angeles, California
- Country: United States
- Hosted by: Natalie Cole, Patti LaBelle and Luther Vandross
- First award: 1987

Highlights
- Most awards: Michael Jackson and Boyz II Men (3)
- Website: soultrain.com

Television/radio coverage
- Network: WGN America

The 1993 Soul Train Music Awards was held at the Shrine Auditorium in Los Angeles, California on March 9, 1993. The show was hosted by Natalie Cole, Patti LaBelle and Luther Vandross.

== Special awards ==
=== Heritage Award for Career Achievement ===
- Eddie Murphy

=== Humanitarian Award ===
- Michael Jackson

=== Sammy Davis Jr. Award for Entertainer of the Year ===
- En Vogue

== Winners and nominees ==
Winners are in bold text.

=== Best R&B/Soul Album – Male ===
- **Michael Jackson – Dangerous**
  - Bobby Brown – Bobby
  - Tevin Campbell – T.E.V.I.N.
  - Brian McKnight – Brian McKnight

=== Best R&B/Soul Album – Female ===
- **Mary J. Blige – What's the 411?**
  - Mariah Carey – MTV Unplugged
  - CeCe Peniston – Finally
  - Sade – Love Deluxe

=== Best R&B/Soul Album – Group, Band, or Duo ===
- **En Vogue – Funky Divas**
  - Arrested Development – 3 Years, 5 Months and 2 Days in the Life Of...
  - Prince and the New Power Generation – Love Symbol Album
  - TLC – Ooooooohhh... On the TLC Tip

=== Best R&B/Soul Single – Male ===
- **Michael Jackson – "Remember the Time"**
  - Chuckii Booker – "Games"
  - Bobby Brown – "Humpin' Around"
  - Sir Mix-a-lot – "Baby Got Back"

=== Best R&B/Soul Single – Female ===
- **Whitney Houston – "I Will Always Love You"**
  - Mary J. Blige – "Real Love"
  - Toni Braxton – "Love Shoulda Brought You Home"
  - Vanessa Williams – "Save the Best For Last"

=== Best R&B/Soul Single – Group, Band, or Duo ===
- **Shai – "If I Ever Fall in Love"**
  - Arrested Development – "Tennessee"
  - En Vogue – "My Lovin' (You're Never Gonna Get It)"
  - Jodeci – "Come and Talk to Me"

=== Song of the Year ===
- **Boyz II Men – "End of the Road"**
  - Arrested Development – "Tennessee"
  - En Vogue – "My Lovin' (You're Never Gonna Get It)"
  - Vanessa Williams – "Save the Best For Last"

=== Best Music Video ===
- **Boyz II Men – "End of the Road"**
  - Arrested Development – "People Everyday"
  - En Vogue – "Giving Him Something He Can Feel"
  - Michael Jackson – "Remember the Time"

=== Best New R&B/Soul Artist ===
- **Mary J. Blige**
  - Arrested Development
  - Kris Kross
  - Shai

=== Best Gospel Album ===
- **Shirley Caesar – He's Working It Out for You**
  - Milton Brunson and The Thompson Community Singers – My Mind is Made Up
  - Commissioned – Number 7
  - John P. Kee and the New Life Choir – We Walk By Faith

=== Best Rap Album ===
- **Arrested Development – 3 Years, 5 Months and 2 Days in the Life Of...**
  - Das EFX – Dead Serious
  - Father MC – Close to You
  - Kris Kross – Totally Krossed Out

=== Best Jazz Album ===
- **Najee – Just an Illusion**
  - Gerald Albright – Live at Birdland West
  - George Duke – Snapshot
  - George Howard – Do I Ever Cross Your Mind

== Performers ==
- Arrested Development – "Mr. Wendal"
- Boyz II Men – Medley: "Please Don't Go" / "Motownphilly" / "Uhh Ahh" / "End of the Road"
- Commissioned – "Second Chance"
- En Vogue – Medley: "Best of My Love" / "I Heard It Through the Grapevine" / "Respect" / "Lady Marmalade" / "Tell Me Something Good"
- CeCe Peniston – "Keep On Walkin'
- Mary J. Blige – "Real Love"
- TLC
- Michael Jackson – "Remember the Time"
- Chaka Khan – "And the Melody Still Lingers On (Night in Tunisia)"

=== Notable performances ===
- Michael Jackson, who sang "Remember the Time" during the ceremony, sat in a chair on the stage throughout the entire performance due to an injured ankle; dancers accompanied Jackson on choreography. Eddie Murphy, who was presented by Jackson with the Heritage Award, jokingly remarked "Isn't it nice to see him getting out and giving people awards.... I'd like to thank Michael for hobbling out here and giving me this award."

== Presenters ==
- Keith Sweat, Shanice, and Mario Van Peebles - Presented Best R&B Soul New Artist
- Robert L. Johnson and Tracy Davis - Presented Sammy Davis Jr. Award For Entertainer of the Year
- Karyn Parsons, Dr. Dre, and Shai - Presented Best R&B Soul Music Video
- Freddie Jackson, TLC, and Kadeem Hardison - Presented Best Jazz Album
- LL Cool J, Nona Gaye, and The Whispers - Presented Best Rap Album
- Jamie Foxx, Toni Braxton, and Daddy Mac - Presented Best R&B Soul Single Group, Band, or Duo
- Eddie Murphy - Presented Humanitarian Award
- Holly Robinson Peete, Father MC, and Silk - Presented Best R&B Soul Single Male
- George Howard and Tevin Campbell - Presented Best R&B Soul Single Female
- Rosie Perez, Najee, and Wreckx-N-Effect - Presented Best Gospel Album
- Michael Jackson - Presented Heritage Award For Career Achievement
- Chuckii Booker, Chante Moore, and Naughty by Nature - Presented Best R&B Soul Album Group, Band, or Duo
- Keith Washington, Ice-T, and Kim Wayans - Presented Best R&B Soul Album Female
- Miki Howard, Mark Curry, and Digable Planets - Presented Best R&B Soul Song of the Year
- Sheryl Lee Ralph, Johnny Gill, and Run DMC - Presented Best R&B Soul Album Male
