= Nadirah Shakoor =

American musician

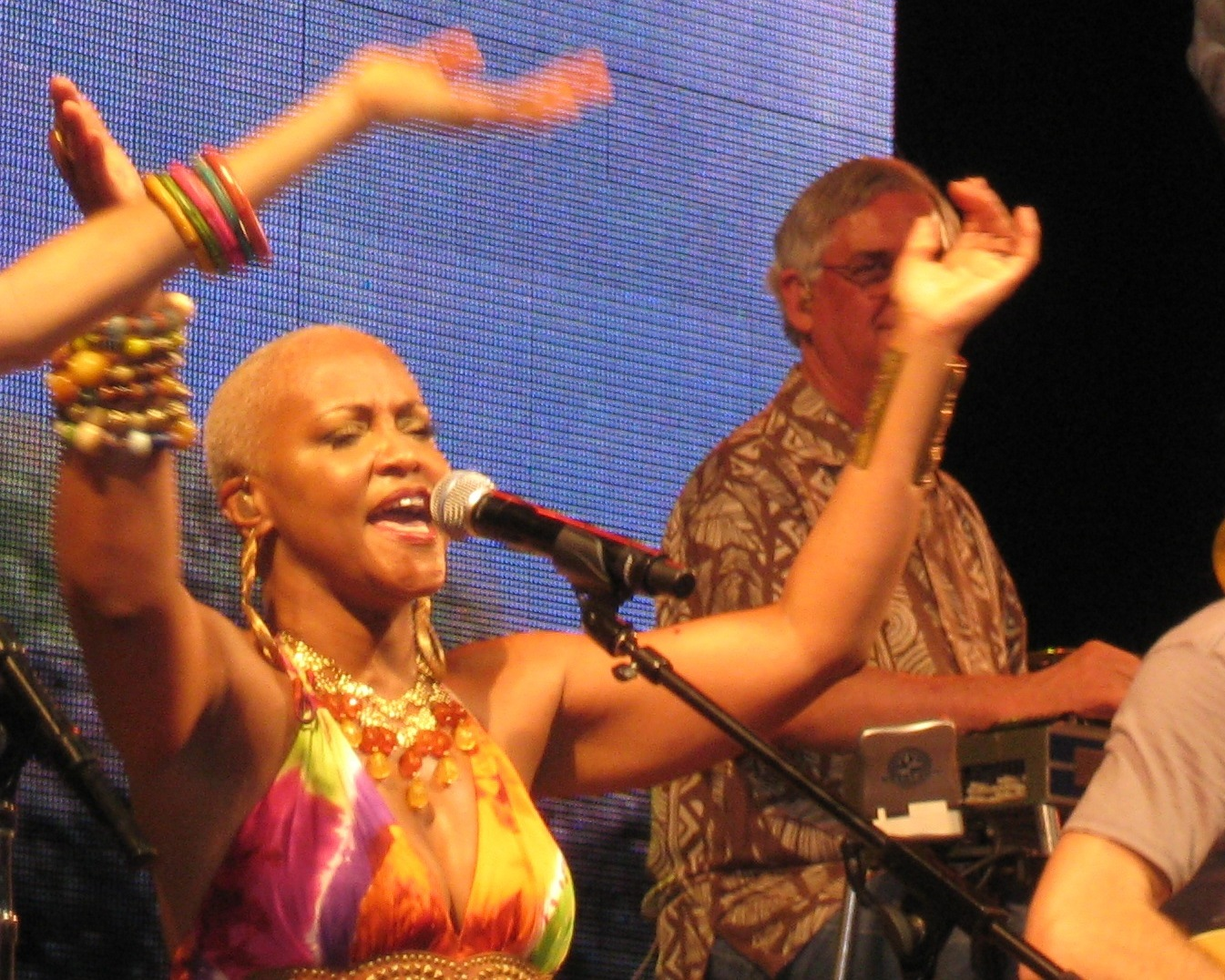
Shakoor performing with Jimmy Buffett's Coral Reefer Band in June 2009

Nadirah Shakoor is an American singer, songwriter and recording artist. She is best known for her work as featured female vocalist in Jimmy Buffett's Coral Reefer Band, in the hip hop group Arrested Development and for her solo albums. She has one Grammy nomination.

== Career ==
=== Arrested Development and Speech ===
She was a female vocalist of the hip hop group Arrested Development, of which she was a member from 1993 until 1995. She was nominated for a Grammy Award for its second album, Zingalamaduni. Nadirah was also featured in Arrested Development's Unplugged DVD and album.

=== Jimmy Buffett's Coral Reefer Band ===
Shakoor joined the Jimmy Buffett's Coral Reefer Band in 1995, touring as its featured female vocalist. Alongside Tina Gullickson, she was a dancer and a vocalist. In concerts, Shakoor often had a number as lead vocalist and contributed secondary vocals to Buffett's "Son of a Son of a Sailor".

=== Touring and recording ===
She also toured or recorded with Madonna, Al Jarreau, Paula Abdul, Quincy Jones, Jasmine Guy, Howard Hewett, Phillip Bailey and others.

=== Solo career ===
Her debut album, Soul Power (EMI Music Japan), was produced by Speech, and her next two projects, NadirahSongs and Obsessed with Peace Vol. I were released independently. In 2000, she teamed up with her best friend, producer Osunlade. Together, they released several house-music songs on Osunlade's Yoruba Records label that quickly became classics of the genre. "Love Song," "Just a Breath Away," and "Pride" are three of their most popular collaborations.

On October 14, 2008, Shakoor released a new album titled Nod to the Storyteller on Jimmy Buffett's Mailboat Records label, which includes two songs written by her along with unique covers of songs written by Jimmy Buffett and several other artists. She announced on the "Time After Island Time" radio program that she will be releasing a follow-up album. After the release, Nadirah and her brother, drummer Rasheed Shakoor, put together a band called Outside Art to help promote the album and to bring more deep house to the live-music scene.
