= Unplugged (Arrested Development album) =

Live album by Arrested Development
- Released: March 1993
- Recorded: December 17, 1992
- Venue: Ed Sullivan Theater, New York City
- Genre: Hip hop
- Length: 66:15
- Label: Chrysalis

Arrested Development chronology
3 Years, 5 Months and 2 Days in the Life Of... (1992)	Unplugged (1993)	Zingalamaduni (1994)

Professional ratings
Review scores
Source	Rating
AllMusic	2/5 stars
Calgary Herald	B
The Encyclopedia of Popular Music	3/5 stars
Entertainment Weekly	C−
Los Angeles Times	2.5/4 stars
The Rolling Stone Album Guide	3/5 stars
The Village Voice	C

Unplugged is a live album by American hip hop group Arrested Development. Performing live at the Ed Sullivan Theater in New York City on December 17, 1992, their performance was recorded for the MTV Unplugged television series.

== Track listing ==
Unplugged track listing
No.	Title	Length
1.	"Time"	0:53
2.	"Give a Man a Fish"	4:05
3.	"The Gettin'"	2:10
4.	"Natural"	4:55
5.	"Searchin' for One Soul"	1:22
6.	"Raining Revolution"	4:33
7.	"Fishin' 4 Religion"	4:04
8.	"Mama's Always on Stage"	3:21
9.	"U"	5:21
10.	"Mr. Wendal"	4:35
11.	"People Everyday"	6:51
12.	"Give a Man a Fish" (Instrumental)	4:11
13.	"The Gettin'" (Instrumental)	2:10
14.	"Natural" (Instrumental)	4:55
15.	"Searchin' for One Soul" (Instrumental)	1:22
16.	"Raining Revolution" (Instrumental)	4:33
17.	"Mama's Always on Stage" (Instrumental)	4:37
18.	"Mr. Wendal" (Instrumental)	3:30

== Personnel ==
- Speech – director, vocals, mixing, co-music director
- Headliner – turntables
- Aerle Taree – vocals, stylist
- Montsho Eshe – vocals, dancer, choreographer
- Rasha Don – drums
- Baba Oje – spiritual advisor
- Nadirah Ali – vocals
- Michael Alvord – mixing assistant, assistant
- Arnaé – vocals
- Kundalini Mark Batson – piano, director, co-music director
- Michael Benabib – photography
- Kevin Carnes – vocals
- Freddie Cash – bass
- Alex Coletti – producer
- Fulani Hart – vocals
- Audrey Johns – liner note producer
- Ju Ju House – drums
- Terrance Cinque Mason – vocals
- Frank Micelotta – photography
- Kevin Parker – mixing assistant, assistant
- Naomi Patton – liner notes
- David Pleasant – harmonica, percussion
- Don Rasa – drums
- Brandon Ross – guitar
- Kelli Sae – vocals
- Alvin Speights – engineer, mixing
- Joel Stillerman – executive producer
- Atiba Wilson – flute, percussion

== Charts ==
Chart performance for Unplugged
Chart (1993)	Peak position
Australian Albums (ARIA)	18
New Zealand Albums (RMNZ)	26
UK Albums (OCC)	40
US Billboard 200	60
US Top R&B/Hip-Hop Albums (Billboard)	38
