= Tennessee (Arrested Development song) =

1992 single by Arrested Development

- 1993 UK re-release artwork

Single by Arrested Development

from the album 3 Years, 5 Months and 2 Days in the Life Of...
- Released: March 24, 1992
- Genre: Alternative hip-hop
- Length: 4:32
- Label: Chrysalis; Cooltempo
- Songwriters: Todd Thomas; Aerle Taree; Prince
- Producer: Speech

Arrested Development singles chronology
"Tennessee" (1992)	"People Everyday" (1992)

Music video
- "Tennessee" on YouTube

"Tennessee" is a song by American hip hop group Arrested Development, released in March 1992, by Chrysalis and Cooltempo Records as the first single from their debut album, 3 Years, 5 Months & 2 Days in the Life Of... (1992). The song was produced by group member Speech and contains a sample of Prince's 1988 hit "Alphabet St.". "Tennessee" peaked at number six in the United States and won the Grammy Award for Best Rap Performance by a Duo or Group in 1993. The accompanying music video was directed by Milcho Manchevski. A 2007 poll of VH1 viewers placed the song at number 71 on the list of the "Greatest Songs of the 90s" and is listed as one of the "500 Songs That Shaped Rock and Roll" by the Rock and Roll Hall of Fame. It was also ranked number 78 on VH1's "100 Greatest Songs of Hip Hop".

== Background ==
Group member Speech was inspired to write the song after meeting up with his brother at his grandmother's funeral in Tennessee. Shortly afterward, his brother died suddenly from a bad asthma attack, and Speech wrote the song about the experience of losing two loved ones so close together.

"Tennessee" uses a sample from Prince's "Alphabet St." that was not cleared ahead of time. Prince's lawyers waited until after the song sold well and then charged the group $100,000 for the use of said sample. Speech later said he felt Prince gave him "a break" by demanding a single payment instead of co-writing credit on the song, which would have entitled Prince to a share of all royalties in the future.

== Critical reception ==
Larry Flick from Billboard magazine wrote, "Melodic, sing-song rap possesses a modern spiritual quality. Female vocalist Dionne adds heavy, soulful element to the proceedings. Socially relevant, thought-provoking lyrics lead listener into a hook-driven, memorable chorus. Track has a unique appeal and would add a new dimension to the average urban playlist." Clark and DeVancey from Cash Box said that Arrested Development "straight blew up on the scene" with "Tennessee", noting its "rapping-while-singing approach". James Bernard from Entertainment Weekly felt the lyrics of the song "resonate like Speech's most private thoughts, betraying his desperate moments." Robert Hilburn from Los Angeles Times wrote, "Some of pop's best moments come from groups that seem to arrive from nowhere with a confidence and mature vision--and that's the case here. The Georgia rap group tries in this graceful, spiritually-tinged song to reconcile life's blessings with social injustice." Another Los Angeles Times editor, Chris Willman, remarked that it "may go down in the history books as the first major sad rap hit. Not bitter, not raging or recriminatory, just flat-out, soul-and-heaven-searchingly heartsick." In his weekly UK chart commentary, James Masterton stated, "The group who seemingly can do no wrong at present notch up their third hit."

Jim Arundel from Melody Maker said, "It's quite brilliant. Another step forward for rap." Andy Beevers from Music Week gave it a full score of five out of five and named it Pick of the Week in the category of Dance, complimenting it as "arguably the best track on the LP". Parry Gettelman from Orlando Sentinel felt the album's "killer single", "Tennessee", "has a simple, irresistible melodic hook, a lazy beat that recalls hot afternoons and amazingly complex lyrics." A reviewer from People Magazine found that "the half-sung, half-rapped delivery of the band’s leader, Speech (Todd Thomas), suggests a hayride with Sly Stone and Prince on the buckboard." James Hamilton from the Record Mirror Dance Update described it as a "familiar jiggly roller" in his weekly dance column. Pete Stanton from Smash Hits also gave the song five out of five, writing, "Slip on some dungarees, chew on a length of straw and groove your groovy bits with the yokels down on the farm. The Development's infectious rap is taking us over and no one is struggling to get free. This track [...] starts with a "Ten-Ten-Ten-Tennessee" and is followed by a bumping, grinding and a dash of groove. They are without doubt the greatest rap outfit about at the mo."

== Chart performance ==
"Tennessee" topped the US Billboard Hot R&B Singles chart for one week and peaked at number six on the Billboard Hot 100. In the United Kingdom, the song spent seven weeks on the UK Singles Chart, reaching number 46, but after the top-10 successes of both "People Everyday" and "Mr. Wendal" on the chart, it was re-released in 1993, charting for a further six weeks and peaking at number 18.

== Music video ==
The music video for "Tennessee" was directed by New York-based Macedonian film director, photographer and artist Milcho Manchevski. It was shot in Georgia, with friends of the group and people from the local area appearing in the clip.

== Impact and legacy ==
"Tennessee" was awarded one of BMI's Pop Awards in 1994, honoring the songwriters, composers and music publishers of the song. It was ranked number 99 on Entertainment Weekly's "The 100 Greatest Summer Songs", saying, "Yes, technically, it's a hip-hop meditation on the troubling history of the South. But only out of the classroom could a history lesson sound so smooth and intoxicating." Slant Magazine ranked it number 98 in their list of "The 100 Best Singles of the 1990s" in 2011, writing, "Perhaps no other track from the early ‘90s provided better (or catchier) proof that hip-hop was more versatile and capable than prevailing gangster-rap themes than Arrested Development’s "Tennessee", its stuttering drumline ably providing a clean backdrop for expositions on civil rights, genealogical discovery, Southern culture, the devastating legacy of slavery, and the nature of God. A pained but uplifting narrative struggles at times to catch up with the song's driving gait, but "Tennessee" satisfies nonetheless, mixing raw, percussive power, quirky sampling, and inspirational imagery into one cerebral whole."

Bob Dylan played the song on the "Tennessee" episode of the first season of his Theme Time Radio Hour show in 2006, noting that Arrested Development had "kind of updated the Sly and the Family Stone sound for the hip-hop generation”.

A 2007 poll of VH1 viewers placed it at number 71 on the "Greatest Songs of the 90s" list and was also ranked as one of the "500 Songs That Shaped Rock and Roll" by the Rock and Roll Hall of Fame. It was also listed at number 78 on VH1's "100 Greatest Songs of Hip Hop". The song served as the theme to the short-lived Malcolm-Jamal Warner 1992 sitcom Here and Now.

== Track listings ==
- UK CD
1. "Tennessee" (edit)
2. "Tennessee" (remix)
3. "Fishin 4 Religion" (live)
4. "Mama's Always on Stage"
- Australia maxi-CD
1. "Tennessee" (remix) – 4:48
2. "Tennessee" (For DJs Only) – 2:18
3. "Tennessee" (Dubb mix) – 4:45
4. "Natural" – 4:19
- US maxi-CD
1. "Tennessee" (The Mix) – 4:33
2. "Tennessee" (remix) – 4:40
3. "Tennessee" (For DJs Only) – 2:15
4. "Tennessee" (Dubb mix) – 4:40
5. "Natural" – 4:19

== Charts ==
=== Weekly charts ===
Chart (1992)	Peak position
Australia (ARIA)	14
Canada Singles (The Record)	7
Canada Dance/Urban (RPM)	3
Europe (Eurochart Hot 100)	84
Germany (GfK)	27
Israel (Israeli Singles Chart)	25
Netherlands (Dutch Top 40)	31
Netherlands (Single Top 100)	31
New Zealand (Recorded Music NZ)	12
Sweden (Sverigetopplistan)	24
Switzerland (Schweizer Hitparade)	25
UK Singles (Official Charts)	46
UK Airplay (Music Week)	48
UK Dance (Music Week)	12
US Billboard Hot 100	6
US Dance Club Songs (Billboard)	34
US Dance Singles Sales (Billboard)	16
US Hot R&B/Hip-Hop Songs (Billboard)	1
US Hot Rap Songs (Billboard)	1
US Cash Box Top 100	5

Chart (1993)	Peak position
Europe (Eurochart Hot 100)	54
Europe (European Dance Radio)	24
Ireland (IRMA)	17
UK Singles (Official Charts)	18
UK Airplay (Music Week)	18
UK Club Chart (Music Week)	5

=== Year-end charts ===
Chart (1992)	Position
Australia (ARIA)	84
US Billboard Hot 100	40
US Hot R&B Singles (Billboard)	9
US Hot Rap Singles (Billboard)	4

== Certifications ==
Region	Certification	Certified units/sales
United States (RIAA)	Gold	500,000^{*}
^{*} Sales figures based on certification alone.

== Release history ==
Region	Date	Format(s)	Label(s)	Ref.
United States	March 24, 1992	7-inch vinyl; 12-inch vinyl; cassette	Chrysalis	
United Kingdom	April 27, 1992	7-inch vinyl; 12-inch vinyl; CD	Cooltempo	
United Kingdom	June 8, 1992	Cassette	Cooltempo	
Australia	July 20, 1992	CD; cassette	Chrysalis	

== See also ==
- List of number-one R&B singles of 1992 (U.S.)
