= Hoopla (album) =

Album by Speech

Studio album by Speech
- Released: 1999
- Genre: Hip hop
- Length: 70:48
- Label: TVT
- Producer: Speech

Speech chronology
Speech (1996)	Hoopla (1999)	Down South Produckshuns (2002)

Hoopla is the second solo album by Speech, an American rapper known for his work with Arrested Development. It was released in 1999 on TVT Records.

== Critical reception ==
Professional ratings
Review scores
Source	Rating
AllMusic	2.5/5 stars
Calgary Herald	3.5/5
Chicago Sun-Times	3/5 stars
Entertainment Weekly	C
Los Angeles Times	3/4 stars
Spin	7/10

Hoopla received mixed reviews from critics. Rob Brunner gave the album a C, and described it as a "lightweight retread," "sometimes silly," and "occasionally awful." The Los Angeles Times' Soren Baker was more favorable in his review, giving it a 3 out of 4 star rating and writing, "A comfortable, funky mix of guitars, keyboards and backup singing gives the album a relaxed feel."

== Track listing ==
1. Do You Know How to Get to Highway 85 (Skit) – 0:45
2. Clocks in Sync with Mine – 5:37
3. The Hey Song – 4:50
4. I Think Yin Is Having a Baby, But I Don't Know (Skit) – 0:22
5. Our Image – 5:55
6. Movin' On – 3:52
7. Which Radio Station Has the Guts (Skit) – 0:16
8. The Mountain of Lonely – 6:04
9. Are You Still with Me – 0:13
10. Slave of It All – 5:53
11. Leave a Message... Bye Bye (Skit) – 0:13
12. Sumtimes I Do – 5:11
13. Yeah Yeah – 5:15
14. Real Love – 5:28
15. Shut Down Our Mind Machine – 1:04
16. The List Goes On – 4:58
17. Redemption Song – 6:14
18. If Life Is a River – 4:28
19. The Hey Song (Remix) Another Perspective – 4:15

== Credits ==
- Speech - Composer, Drum Programming, Engineer, Executive Producer, Percussion, Producer, Sampling, Scratching, Lead and Background Vocals
- Albert Burroughs - Engineer
- Andrew Lane - Wurlitzer
- Barry Kimmel - Engineer
- Bill Cox - Harmonica
- Blake Eisman - Mixing, Piano
- Carl T. Boyd - Saxophone
- Colin Lantry - Composer, Engineer
- Deanna Dawn - Vocals (Background)
- Deborah Wright - Vocals (Background)
- Eddie Davis - Trumpet
- Eddie Stokes - Beats, Fender Rhodes, Handclapping, Producer, String Arrangements, Vocals, Vocals (Background)
- Enrique Coley - Drums
- Felix Farrar - Violin
- Fletcher Dozier Jr. - Wah Wah Guitar
- Franquil Hilliard - Engineer, Vocals (Background)
- Freddy Luster - Composer
- Ike "Za" Williams - Bass, Composer, Guitar (Bass)
- India - India - Vocals (Background)
- Jason Stokes - Assistant, Mixing Assistant
- Jay Frigoletto - Mastering, Wurlitzer
- Jimmie Wilson - Mixing Assistant
- Kelly Fanning - Trumpet
- Kerren Berz - Violin
- Kevin Parker - Vocals
- Larry Flannagan - Viola
- Mental Menace - Background Vocals
- Michael Musmanna - Engineer, Tape Editor, Vocals
- Mike Mullins - Guitar (Acoustic)
- Nadirah Shakoor - Primary Artist, Vocals, Vocals (Background)
- Nakayo - Percussion
- Neal Wyms - Bass Guitar
- Nicha "Wildflower" Thompson - Composer, Vocals, Vocals (Background)
- Omar Phillips - Percussion, Strings
- Ralph Cacciurri - Engineer, Mixing Assistant
- Rich Ward - Electric Guitar
- Rick Morris - Drum Loops, Drums
- Roderick Smith - Saxophone
- Shaikera Sincere - Vocals
- Spencer Brewer - Cello
- T Bone - Background Vocals
- Taylor Made - Vocals
- The Brain - Live Sound
- The Prophet - Hammond Organ
- Tommy Jenkins - Vocals
- Leonard B. Johnson - A&R
- Robin Glowski - Art Direction
- Christian Lantry - Photography
