= Foege =

Foege is a surname. Notable people with the surname include:

- Alec Foege, American author and magazine journalist
- Ro Foege (born 1938), American politician from Iowa
- William Foege (1936–2026), American physician and epidemiologist

== See also ==
- Warren Foegele (born 1996), Canadian ice hockey player
