= Grammy Award for Best Rap Performance by a Duo or Group =

The Grammy Award for Best Rap Performance by a Duo or Group was awarded between 1991 and 2011, alongside the Grammy Award for Best Rap Solo Performance. Previously a single award was presented for Best Rap Performance.

The award was discontinued in 2012. All solo and duo/group rap performances have since been shifted to the revived Best Rap Performance category.

Years reflect the year in which the Grammy Awards were presented, for music released from October a year and a half prior to September the previous year.

== Recipients ==
Year^{[I]}	Performing artist(s)	Work	Nominees	Ref.
1991	Quincy Jones, Big Daddy Kane, Ice-T, Kool Moe Dee, Melle Mel & Quincy Jones III	"Back on the Block"	Digital Underground — "The Humpty Dance"; DJ Jazzy Jeff & The Fresh Prince — And in This Corner...; Public Enemy — Fear of a Black Planet; West Coast Rap All-Stars — "We're All in the Same Gang"	
1992	DJ Jazzy Jeff & The Fresh Prince	"Summertime"	Heavy D & the Boyz — "Now That We Found Love"; Naughty by Nature — "O.P.P."; Public Enemy — Apocalypse 91... The Enemy Strikes Black; Salt-N-Pepa — "Let's Talk About Sex"	
1993	Arrested Development	"Tennessee"	Beastie Boys — Check Your Head; House of Pain — "Jump Around"; Kris Kross — "Jump"; Public Enemy — Greatest Misses	
1994	Digable Planets	"Rebirth of Slick (Cool Like Dat)"	Arrested Development — "Revolution"; Cypress Hill — "Insane in the Brain"; Dr. Dre & Snoop Dogg — "Nuthin' but a 'G' Thang"; Naughty by Nature — "Hip Hop Hooray"	
1995	Salt-N-Pepa	"None of Your Business"	Arrested Development — "Ease My Mind"; Cypress Hill — "I Ain't Goin' Out Like That"; Heavy D & the Boyz — "Nuttin' But Love"; Warren G & Nate Dogg — "Regulate"	
1996	Method Man & Mary J. Blige	"I'll Be There for You/You're All I Need to Get By"	Bone Thugs-n-Harmony — "1st of tha Month"; Cypress Hill — "Throw Your Set in the Air"; Naughty by Nature — "Feel Me Flow"; Tha Dogg Pound — "What Would You Do"	
1997	Bone Thugs-n-Harmony	"Tha Crossroads"	2Pac, Dr. Dre & Roger Troutman — "California Love"; 2Pac & K-Ci & JoJo — "How Do U Want It"; A Tribe Called Quest — "1nce Again"; Salt-N-Pepa — "Champagne"	
1998	Puff Daddy, Faith Evans & 112	"I'll Be Missing You"	Lil' Kim, Da Brat, Missy Elliott, Angie Martinez & Left Eye — "Not Tonight"; Puff Daddy & Mase — "Can't Nobody Hold Me Down"; The Notorious B.I.G., Puff Daddy & Mase — "Mo Money Mo Problems"; Wyclef Jean, Celia Cruz & Jeni Fujita — "Guantanamera"	
1999	Beastie Boys	"Intergalactic"	Jermaine Dupri & Jay-Z — "Money Ain't a Thang"; Lord Tariq and Peter Gunz — "Deja Vu (Uptown Baby)"; Outkast — "Rosa Parks"; Pras, Mýa & Ol' Dirty Bastard — "Ghetto Supastar (That Is What You Are)"	
2000	The Roots & Erykah Badu featuring Eve (awarded in 2026 over technicality)	"You Got Me"	Busta Rhymes & Janet Jackson — "What's It Gonna Be?!"; Dr. Dre & Snoop Dogg — "Still D.R.E."; Eminem & Dr. Dre — "Guilty Conscience"; Puff Daddy & R. Kelly — "Satisfy You"	
2001	Dr. Dre & Eminem	"Forgot About Dre"	Beastie Boys — "Alive"; De La Soul & Redman — "Oooh."; Dr. Dre, Snoop Dogg, Kurupt & Nate Dogg — "The Next Episode"; Jay-Z & UGK — "Big Pimpin'"	
2002	Outkast	"Ms. Jackson"	Gorillaz — "Clint Eastwood"; Ja Rule, Lil' Mo & Vita — "Put It on Me"; Jay-Z, Beanie Sigel, Memphis Bleek & Static Major — "Change the Game"; P. Diddy, Black Rob & Mark Curry — "Bad Boy for Life"	
2003	Outkast & Killer Mike	"The Whole World"	AZ & Nas — "The Essence"; Big Tymers — "Still Fly"; Busta Rhymes, P. Diddy & Pharrell — "Pass the Courvoisier, Part II"; Cam'ron & Juelz Santana — "Oh Boy"	
2004	Nelly, P. Diddy & Murphy Lee	"Shake Ya Tailfeather"	Missy Elliott & Ludacris — "Gossip Folks"; Lil' Kim & 50 Cent — "Magic Stick"; Juelz Santana & Cam'ron — "Dipset (Santana's Town)"; Young Gunz — "Can't Stop, Won't Stop"	
2005	The Black Eyed Peas	"Let's Get It Started"	Beastie Boys — "Ch-Check It Out"; The Roots — "Don't Say Nuthin"; Snoop Dogg & Pharrell — "Drop It Like It's Hot"; Terror Squad — "Lean Back"	
2006	The Black Eyed Peas	"Don't Phunk with My Heart"	Common & The Last Poets — "The Corner"; Eminem, Dr. Dre & 50 Cent — "Encore"; The Game & 50 Cent — "Hate It or Love It"; Ying Yang Twins — "Wait (The Whisper Song)"	
2007	Chamillionaire & Krayzie Bone	"Ridin'"	Field Mob, Ludacris & Jamie Foxx — "Georgia"; Nelly, Paul Wall & Ali & Gipp — "Grillz"; Outkast — "Mighty O"; The Roots — "Don't Feel Right"	
2008	Common & Kanye West	"Southside"	Fat Joe & Lil Wayne — "Make It Rain"; Kanye West, Nas & KRS-One — "Classic (Better Than I've Ever Been)"; Shop Boyz — "Party Like a Rockstar"; UGK & Outkast — "International Players Anthem (I Choose You)"	
2009	Jay-Z, T.I., Kanye West & Lil Wayne	"Swagga Like Us"	Big Boi, André 3000 & Raekwon — "Royal Flush"; Lil Wayne & Jay-Z — "Mr. Carter"; Ludacris & T.I. — "Wish You Would"; Young Jeezy & Kanye West — "Put On"	
2010	Eminem, Dr. Dre & 50 Cent	"Crack a Bottle"	Beastie Boys & Nas — "Too Many Rappers"; Fabolous & Jay-Z — "Money Goes, Honey Stay"; Kanye West & Young Jeezy — "Amazing"; Kid Cudi, Kanye West & Common — "Make Her Say"	
2011	Jay-Z & Swizz Beatz	"On to the Next One"	Big Boi & Cutty — "Shutterbugg"; Drake, T.I. & Swizz Beatz — "Fancy"; Ludacris & Nicki Minaj — "My Chick Bad"; Young Jeezy & Plies — "Lose My Mind"	

== Category facts ==
- Most wins in this category:

The Black Eyed Peas, Kanye West, Outkast, P. Diddy, Dr. Dre, Jay-Z, Eminem and Krayzie Bone - 2 wins

- Most Nominations in this category:
  - 1. Dr. Dre - 8 nominations
  - 2. P. Diddy, Jay-Z, Big Boi - 7 nominations
  - 3. Kanye West, André 3000 - 6 nominations
  - 4. Outkast, Beastie Boys - 5 nominations
  - 5. Ludacris, Eminem, Snoop Dogg - 4 nominations
  - 6. Naughty by Nature, Young Jeezy, Cypress Hill, T.I. - 3 nominations
