= Malcolm X (soundtrack) =

Soundtrack album by Various artists
- Released: 1992
- Recorded: Various
- Genres: Jazz, R&B, blues, soul, hip hop
- Length: 49:09
- Label: Qwest Records/Reprise Records
- Producers: Quincy Jones (exec.), Spike Lee (exec.)

Malcolm X is the soundtrack to the 1992 Spike Lee film, Malcolm X.

The album omits "A Change Is Going to Come" by Sam Cooke, played in the film leading up to the assassination of Malcolm X, because Lee was unable to obtain permission to include it.

== Notes by Spike Lee ==
The album inner sleeve contains the following note from director Spike Lee:

Many of the artists on this project were friends of Detroit Red/Malcolm Little. Malcolm loved to dance, and to be around the music. We have attempted to re-create that music, that sound - the distinct sound of the African-American experience.

The songs gathered here, from Big Joe Turner's "Roll 'Em Pete" to Arrested Development's rap anthem, "Revolution", all in some way reflect what it means to live, breathe, die and love, as the descendants of slaves.

May we look forward to the day when Black Radio is as diverse as the music you're listening to here.

—Spike Lee, Brooklyn, NY, September 1992

== Track listing ==
No.	Title	Writer(s)	Producer(s)	Length
1.	"Revolution" (Arrested Development)	Todd "Speech" Thomas & Taree Aerle Jones	Speech	4:49
2.	"Roll 'Em Pete" (Big Joe Turner)	Pete Johnson & Big Joe Turner		3:44
3.	"Flying Home" (Lionel Hampton)	Benny Goodman & Lionel Hampton		3:15
4.	"My Prayer" (The Ink Spots)	Jimmy Kennedy & George Boulanger		3:16
5.	"Big Stuff" (Billie Holiday)	Leonard Bernstein		2:29
6.	"Don't Cry Baby" (Erskine Hawkins)	Jimmy Johnson, Stella Unger & Saul Bernie		3:21
7.	"Beans And Cornbread" (Louis Jordan)	F. Clark & E. Moore		2:51
8.	"Azure" (Ella Fitzgerald)	Duke Ellington		2:21
9.	"Alabama" (John Coltrane)	John Coltrane		2:26
10.	"That Lucky Old Sun Just Rolls Around Heaven" (Ray Charles)	Haven Gillespie & Beasley Smith		4:23
11.	"Arabesque Cookie" (Duke Ellington)	Pyotr Ilyich Tchaikovsky & Duke Ellington & Billy Strayhorn		5:46
12.	"Shotgun" (Junior Walker & the All Stars)	Autry DeWalt		3:03
13.	"Someday We'll All Be Free" (Aretha Franklin)	Donny Hathaway & Edward U. Howard	Arif Mardin	8:21
14.	"A Change Is Gonna Come" (Sam Cooke)	Sam Cooke	Hugo & Luigi	3:12
Total length:				49:09
