= Zingalamaduni =

Studio album by Arrested Development
- Released: June 14, 1994
- Recorded: 1993–1994
- Studio: Transmedia Studio (Georgia)
- Genre: Hip hop
- Length: 54:25
- Labels: Chrysalis; EMI
- Producer: Speech

Arrested Development chronology
Unplugged (1993)	Zingalamaduni (1994)	Best of Arrested Development (1998)

Singles from Zingalamaduni
- 1. "Ease My Mind" Released: April 26, 1994; 2. "United Front" Released: July 19, 1994; 3. "Africa's Inside Me" Released: November 29, 1994

Professional ratings
Initial reviews (in 1994)
Review scores
Source	Rating
Entertainment Weekly	A
NME	8/10
Rolling Stone	4/5 stars
Select	4/5 medals
Smash Hits	4/5
Spin	0.5/1 star
The Village Voice	C+

Professional ratings
Retrospective reviews (after 1994)
Review scores
Source	Rating
AllMusic	3/5 stars
The Encyclopedia of Popular Music	3/5 stars
The Rolling Stone Album Guide	2.5/5 stars
Spin Alternative Record Guide	6/10

Zingalamaduni is the second studio album by American hip hop group Arrested Development. It was released on June 14, 1994, through Chrysalis Records. The album's title is a truncated form of a Swahili phrase meaning "the beehive of culture." Despite spawning three singles ("United Front", "Africa's Inside Me" and "Ease My Mind", the latter being the highest-charting single released from the album), it was considered a commercial disappointment compared to their previous album 3 Years, 5 Months and 2 Days in the Life Of..., peaking at number 55 on the Billboard 200 chart and at number 20 on the Top R&B/Hip-Hop Albums chart.

== Track listing ==
All tracks are written by Speech, except where noted.

Zingalamaduni track listing
No.	Title	Writer(s)	Length
1.	"WMFW (We Must Fight & Win) FM" (Intro)	Speech; Baba Oje	1:55
2.	"United Minds"		5:17
3.	"Ache'n for Acres"		2:39
4.	"United Front"		4:39
5.	"Africa's Inside Me"	Speech; Fulani Faluke	3:11
6.	"Pride"		5:38
7.	"Shell"	Speech; Kwesi Asuo	3:25
8.	"Mister Landlord"		2:54
9.	"Warm Sentiments"	Speech; Headliner	4:11
10.	"The Drum" (Instrumental)		1:57
11.	"In the Sunshine"		4:31
12.	"Kneelin' at My Altar"		2:33
13.	"Fountain of Youth"		3:21
14.	"Ease My Mind"		4:12
15.	"Praisin' U"		4:02
Total length:			54:25

Japanese edition bonus tracks
No.	Title	Length
16.	"Eggbeaters"
17.	"Ease My Mind" (Premier's Remix)
18.	"United Front" (Noise in My Attic Remix)

Samples used

- "United Minds" contains a sample of "Your Kite, My Kite", written by Toney Romeo.
- "United Front" contains a sample of "Footsteps in the Dark (Parts 1 & 2)" by the Isley Brothers.
- "Africa's Inside Me" contains a sample of "In All My Wildest Dreams" by Joe Sample.
- "Warm Sentiments" contains a sample of "Look What You've Done for Me" by Al Green.
- "Kneelin' at My Altar" contains a sample of "Baby That's What I Need" by Joe Zawinul.
- "Fountain of Youth" contains a sample of "Tighten Up My Thang", written by Isaac Hayes and David Porter.
- "Ease My Mind" contains samples of "Open All Night Drums" by George Clinton and "Summer Breeze" by Ceasar Frazier.

== Singles ==
"Ease My Mind"

Single by Arrested Development

from the album Zingalamaduni
- Released: April 26, 1994
- Studio: Transmedia Studio (Georgia)
- Genre: Hip-hop
- Length: 4:12
- Label: Chrysalis
- Songwriter: Arrested Development
- Producer: Speech

Arrested Development singles chronology
"Natural" (1993)	"Ease My Mind" (1994)	"United Front" (1994)

Music video
- "Ease My Mind" on YouTube

=== "Ease My Mind" ===
This song was the lead single from the album and was produced by member Speech. In the United States, the song peaked at number 45 on the Billboard Hot 100, number 44 on the Radio Songs, number 14 on the Hot R&B/Hip-Hop Songs, number 13 on both the R&B/Hip-Hop Airplay and the Rhythmic Airplay, number 4 on the Hot Rap Songs and number 5 on the Dance Singles Sales charts. It also reached number 11 in New Zealand, number 33 on the UK singles chart, and number 43 in Australia.

It was nominated for a Grammy Award for Best Rap Performance by a Duo or Group at the 37th Annual Grammy Awards, but ultimately lost to Salt-N-Pepa's "None of Your Business".

== Charts ==
Chart performance for Zingalamaduni
Chart (1994)	Peak position
Australian Albums (ARIA)	34
Canadian Albums (RPM)	40
Dutch Albums (Album Top 100)	54
German Albums (Offizielle Top 100)	34
Swedish Albums (Sverigetopplistan)	31
Swiss Albums (Schweizer Hitparade)	30
UK Albums (Official Charts)	16
US Billboard 200	55
US Top R&B/Hip-Hop Albums (Billboard)	20
