= Revolution (Arrested Development song) =

Song by Arrested Development

Single by Arrested Development

from the album Malcolm X
- Released: 1992
- Genre: Hip hop
- Length: 4:48
- Songwriters: Speech; Aerle Taree
- Producer: Speech

Arrested Development singles chronology
"Mr. Wendal" (1992)	"Revolution" (1992)	"Natural" (1993)

Music video
- "Revolution" on YouTube

"Revolution" is a song by American hip hop group Arrested Development, from the soundtrack to the 1992 film Malcolm X.

== Background ==
Speech has expressed gratitude for the film's depiction of a "side" of Malcolm X which shares the perspective of Arrested Development. Spike Lee, the director of the film, had asked Speech to write a song for it. Speech considered it a personal responsibility to "acknowledge that there is a need for struggle, because of all the bad things going on in the nation", which is reflected in the line "Am I doing as much as I can for the struggle?" He composed the song with a purpose to urge people into action in bringing about change.

== Music video ==
The music video for "Revolution" was directed by Spike Lee. It was shot in a high school, a city block, and a street in Brooklyn with "about 500 extras". Each location had at least 100 people in the filming. According to Speech, the video was shot in seven hours.

== Charts ==
=== Weekly charts ===
Chart (1992–1993)	Peak position
Australia (ARIA)	7
France (SNEP)	30
Germany (GfK)	31
Ireland (IRMA)	9
Netherlands (Single Top 100)	42
New Zealand (Recorded Music NZ)	2
UK Singles (Official Charts)	4
UK Dance (Music Week) with "Mr. Wendal"	2
UK Club Chart (Music Week) with "Mr. Wendal"	2
US Billboard Hot 100	90
US Hot R&B/Hip-Hop Songs (Billboard)	49
US Cash Box Top 100	88

=== Year-end charts ===
Chart (1993)	Position
Australia (ARIA)	59
