= Speech (Speech album) =

Studio album by Speech
- Released: 1996
- Recorded: 1994–95
- Genre: Rap
- Label: Chrysalis
- Producer: Speech

Speech chronology
Speech (1996)	Hoopla (1999)

Speech is the first solo album by the American rapper Speech, released in 1996.

The album's first single was "Like Marvin Gaye Said (What's Going On)". It first appeared on the Marvin Gaye tribute album Inner City Blues: The Music of Marvin Gaye.

== Production ==
The album was produced by Speech, who also sang on some of the songs. He played most of the instruments on the album, and recorded it in his home studio. Speech contains guest appearances from Pappa Jon, Laurneá Wilkerson, and Foley.

== Critical reception ==
Professional ratings
Review scores
Source	Rating
AllMusic	2/5 stars
The Encyclopedia of Popular Music	3/5 stars
Entertainment Weekly	B+
Knoxville News Sentinel	4/5 stars
MusicHound Rock: The Essential Album Guide	2.5/5 stars
Muzik	4/5 stars

Trouser Press thought that "Speech shows that he can still construct a lulling, even groovy song cycle, but at this point he just doesn’t have the lyrical chops to give it substance." Entertainment Weekly determined that, "with its rapturous echoes of Sly, Stevie, and Prince, Speech by Speech, the boss of the defunct Arrested Development, is more arresting than anyone had a right to expect." The Knoxville News Sentinel concluded that the album "restores some of the initial promise of his group Arrested Development before the band burned out in a blaze of self-importance a couple of years ago."

Vibe called the album "a mess," noting Speech's "desire to become the male Tracy Chapman." The Boston Globe praised Speech's "gift for poppy, smoothly persuasive hip-hop, rather than the gnashing, in-your-face variety." The New York Times stated that "the sound is rawer and less produced and layered than Arrested Development's music... Where Arrested Development sounded like many streams flowing into a single river, the styles, beats and words on Speech all seem to flow from a single stream-of-consciousness."

AllMusic wrote that, "where his former group sounded rootsy and gritty even at their most laid-back, Speech's record sounds slick, generally lacking in funk or dirt."

== Track listing ==
No.	Title	Length
1.	"Can U Hear Me?"
2.	"Ask Somebody Who Ain't (If U Think the System's Workin')"
3.	"Filled with Real"
4.	"Why U Gotta Be Feelin' Like Dat"
5.	"If U Was Me"
6.	"Impregnated Tid Bits of Dope Hits"
7.	"Let's Be Hippies"
8.	"Freestyle #8 from Speech's Vault"
9.	"Like Marvin Gaye Said (What's Going On)"
10.	"Hopelessly"
11.	"Insomnia Song"
12.	"Poor Little Music Boy"
13.	"Ghetto Sex"
14.	"Tell Me Something (Let Me Know)"
15.	"Runnin' Wild"
