= People Everyday =

1992 single by Arrested Development

Single by Arrested Development

from the album 3 Years, 5 Months & 2 Days in the Life Of...
- B-side: "Children Play with Earth"
- Released: July 20, 1992
- Genre: Dancehall; hip hop; reggae
- Length: 3:26
- Label: Chrysalis
- Songwriters: Speech; Sylvester Stewart
- Producer: Speech

Arrested Development singles chronology
| "Tennessee" (1992) | "People Everyday" (1992) | "Mr. Wendal" (1992) |

Music video
- "People Everyday" on YouTube

"People Everyday" is a song by American hip hop group Arrested Development, released in July 1992 by Chrysalis Records as the second single from their debut album, 3 Years, 5 Months & 2 Days in the Life Of... (1992). The song is co-written and produced by group member Speech. It reached number eight on the US Billboard Hot 100 chart and became the group's biggest hit in the United Kingdom, where it peaked at number two on the UK Singles Chart in November 1992. The song also reached the top 10 on the charts of Australia, France, and New Zealand, peaking at number six in all three countries. NME ranked "People Everyday" number 38 in their list of "Singles of the Year" in December 1992.

== Content ==
The song uses the chorus and basic structure of Sly & the Family Stone's 1969 hit "Everyday People", with new verses written by lead singer Speech. He also sings the lead, with additional lyrics sung by Dionne Farris. The single of this song, which was released in 1992, features additional singing vocals by DeAnna Fields, also known as Mawakana Auset, who is an extended family member of the group. Fields also appears in the video for this song, in addition to serving as wardrobe assistant for the video as well. It also uses a sample from "Tappan Zee" by Bob James.

The narrator describes an incident in which he is enjoying a day at the park, listening to music and spending time with his girlfriend. The couple's pleasure is interrupted by the arrival of several "niggas" who are drinking heavily, carrying firearms, and behaving disrespectfully toward the woman. The narrator hopes they will leave him in peace, but they instead begin to grope his girlfriend. He eventually flies into a rage and assaults one of the men, requiring the efforts of several police officers to pull him away. The narrator ends the song with a plea for people to treat each other with respect, since there is no way to predict when a verbal dispute might escalate into a fight or a killing.

== Critical reception ==
In a retrospective review, Daryl Easlea of BBC noted that "People Everyday", which updated Sly and the Family Stone's "Everyday People", "showed how they could embrace the past while modernising the message." Upon the release, Larry Flick from Billboard magazine named it a "languid, dancehall-spiced hip-hopper". He added that "uplifting, unity driven rhymes are delivered with laidback finesse. Tradeoff of rapping and singing works extremely well. Destined for hefty (and much deserved) success." Justin Wilson from The Cavalier Daily remarked that the group's "message of harmony and brotherhood" also resonated on songs like "People Everyday". Greg Kot from Chicago Tribune found that here, Speech "forcefully sets himself apart from the young toughs who roam the streets aiming to bring everyone down to their level. At times, he brings to mind the visionary fire of the late reggae legend Bob Marley." A reviewer from Music Week's RM Dance Update declared it as a "great follow-up" to "Tennessee", that "takes us back to its roots. Musically this is a very strong mid-tempo hip hop track with a reggae style bassline — a sure club and radio hit".

Angus Batey from NME felt the music "works best where it's given room to breathe", as on the "reggae-flavoured" "People Everyday". Another editor, John Mulvey, viewed it as "a deceptively laid-back track", complimenting its "beautifully easy-going, strolling groove." He added, "Wise, warm and impeccably right-on". People Magazine noted that here, the band "scolds men who loiter on street corners, holding their crotches and being obscene". Adam Higginbotham from Select said that it "scrambles Sly Stone's anthem into reggae format." Another editor, Rupert Howe, constated that "a track like 'People Everyday' contrasts the AD pro-African stance with that of a drug- and violence-addicted 'nigga'. "An African is proud of their culture and lives that pride out", Speech says. "While a nigga is just a social product, and that's nothing to be proud of." Alec Foege from Spin declared it as a "true '90s pop anthem", and "socially progressive and roots-conscious." Matthew Sag from Australian student newspaper Woroni found that the song is covering the issue of "street gangs".

== Chart performance ==
"People Everyday" peaked at number one on both the RPM Dance chart in Canada and on the Billboard Hot Rap Singles chart in the United States. On the Billboard Dance Club Play chart, it peaked at number six, while on the Billboard Hot 100, it reached number eight. In Europe, the single entered the top 10 in France and the United Kingdom. In the latter, it reached number two during its third week on the UK Singles Chart, on November 1, 1992. "People Everyday" was a top-20 hit in Ireland and the Netherlands, as well as on the Eurochart Hot 100, where it reached number 12, and it topped the European Dance Radio Chart in October 1992. The song was also a top-30 hit in Sweden. In Oceania, it peaked at number six in both Australia and New Zealand. In West Asia, it became a top-30 hit also in Israel, peaking at number 22 on 3 November 1992. The single was awarded with a gold record in Australia, New Zealand and the US, as well as a silver record in the UK.

== Impact and legacy ==
NME ranked "People Everyday" number 38 in their list of "Singles of the Year" in December 1992. British DJ and presenter Trevor Nelson named the song one of his favourites in 1996, saying, "It's so happy. It's a crowd participation, hope record, it's so cool. It came out it when there were a lot of emerging acts like Jamiroquai. They were light and happy and broke down all the barriers. This record has a feel-good factor of nine and I used to play it every morning before I got up!"

== Track listings ==
- US and Canadian cassette single
1. "People Everyday" — 3:26
2. "People Everyday" (Metamorphosis mix) — 4:52
3. "Children Play with Earth" — 2:38
- US 12-inch single

A1. "People Everyday" (Metamorphosis mix) — 4:52
A2. "People Everyday" (LP version) — 3:26
A3. "People Everyday" (Maroon mix) — 3:39
B1. "People Everyday" (Metamorphosis instrumental) — 3:52
B2. "Children Play with Earth" (LP version) — 2:38

- UK 7-inch single

A. "People Everyday" (Methamorphosis radio edit)
B. "People Everyday" (Methamorphosis radio version)

- European maxi-CD single
1. "People Everyday" (Metamorphosis radio edit)
2. "People Everyday" (Metamorphosis radio version)
3. "People Everyday" (Metamorphosis mix)
4. "People Everyday" (album version)

== Charts ==
=== Weekly charts ===
| Chart (1992–1993) | Peak position |
|---|---|
| Australia (ARIA) | 6 |
| Canada Top Singles (RPM) | 64 |
| Canada Dance/Urban (RPM) | 1 |
| Canada (The Record) | 4 |
| Europe (Eurochart Hot 100) | 12 |
| Europe (European Dance Radio) | 1 |
| France (SNEP) | 6 |
| Ireland (IRMA) | 11 |
| Israel (Israeli Singles Chart) | 22 |
| Netherlands (Dutch Top 40) | 26 |
| Netherlands (Single Top 100) | 20 |
| New Zealand (Recorded Music NZ) | 6 |
| Sweden (Sverigetopplistan) | 27 |
| UK Singles (Official Charts) | 2 |
| UK Airplay (Music Week) | 8 |
| UK Dance (Music Week) | 2 |
| UK Club Chart (Music Week) | 6 |
| US Billboard Hot 100 | 8 |
| US Dance Club Songs (Billboard) | 6 |
| US Dance Singles Sales (Billboard) | 10 |
| US Hot R&B/Hip-Hop Songs (Billboard) | 2 |
| US Hot Rap Songs (Billboard) | 1 |
| US Rhythmic Airplay (Billboard) | 2 |
| US Cash Box Top 100 | 8 |

=== Year-end charts ===
| Chart (1992) | Position |
|---|---|
| Canada Dance/Urban (RPM) | 19 |
| UK Singles (OCC) | 23 |
| UK Club Chart (Music Week) | 97 |
| US Billboard Hot 100 | 67 |
| US Hot R&B Singles (Billboard) | 13 |

| Chart (1993) | Position |
|---|---|
| Australia (ARIA) | 48 |
| New Zealand (RIANZ) | 30 |

== Certifications ==
| Region | Certification | Certified units/sales |
|---|---|---|
| Australia (ARIA) | Gold | 35,000^{^} |
| New Zealand (RMNZ) | Gold | 5,000^{*} |
| New Zealand (RMNZ) Sales + streams | 2× Platinum | 60,000^{‡} |
| United Kingdom (BPI) | Silver | 200,000^{^} |
| United States (RIAA) | Gold | 500,000^{^} |
^{*} Sales figures based on certification alone.^{^} Shipments figures based on certification alone.^{‡} Sales+streaming figures based on certification alone.

== Release history ==
| Region | Date | Format(s) | Label(s) | Ref. |
|---|---|---|---|---|
| United States | July 20, 1992 | 12-inch vinyl; cassette | Chrysalis | |
| United Kingdom | October 12, 1992 | 7-inch vinyl; 12-inch vinyl; CD; cassette | Cooltempo | |
