= Strong (Arrested Development album) =

Studio album by Arrested Development
- Released: (Japan) December 9, 2009 (United States) January 2010
- Genre: Hip hop
- Length: 48 Mins
- Labels: Cutting Edge, Vagabond Records

Arrested Development chronology
Since The Last Time (2006)	Strong (2009)	Standing At The Crossroads (2012)

Strong is the sixth studio album from American alternative hip-hop group Arrested Development, released in January 2010. The single "The World is Changing" charted at No. 9 in Japan.

== Track list (U.S. release) ==
No.	Title	Length
1.	"Bloody"	3:22
2.	"Let Your Voice Be Heard"	4:34
3.	"The Trends"	3:55
4.	"Haters"	4:05
5.	"Any Tree But That"	3:18
6.	"Greener"	5:39
7.	"Too Much Woman For Ya"	3:38
8.	"La La La"	3:32
9.	"We Rad, We Doin' It"	3:41
10.	"The World is Changing"	3:56
11.	"Africa We Thank Ya"	4:05
12.	"Freedom"	4:09

== Track list (Japan release) ==
No.	Title	Length
1.	"Haters"
2.	"Too Much Woman For Ya"
3.	"The World is Changing"
4.	"La La La"
5.	"Let Your Voice Be Heard"
6.	"Bloody"
7.	"Greener"
8.	"The World Is A Friendly Place"
9.	"Any Tree But That"
10.	"We Rad, We Doin' It"
11.	"So Authentic"
12.	"Granola Girl"
13.	"A Truce"
14.	"The World Is Changing (DJ Hasebe Remix)"
