= Jeffrey Henson Scales =

American photographer (born 1954)

- Born: 1954 (age 71–72)
- Known for: Photography

Jeffrey Henson Scales (born 1954) is an American photographer known both for his photographs of the Black Panther Party and for his work as the photography editor of The New York Times.

His work is in the collection of the Museum of Modern Art, and the National Gallery of Art.

In 2022 his book In a Time of Panthers: Early Photographs was published by powerHouse Books.

Scales's work was included in the 2025 exhibition Photography and the Black Arts Movement, 1955–1985 at the National Gallery of Art.
