= 3 Years, 5 Months and 2 Days in the Life Of... =

Studio album by Arrested Development
- Released: March 24, 1992
- Genre: Alternative hip-hop
- Length: 56:13
- Labels: Chrysalis; EMI
- Producer: Speech

Arrested Development chronology
3 Years, 5 Months and 2 Days in the Life Of... (1992)	Unplugged (1993)

Singles from 3 Years, 5 Months and 2 Days in the Life Of...
- 1. "Tennessee" Released: March 24, 1992; 2. "People Everyday" Released: July 20, 1992; 3. "Mr. Wendal" Released: December 7, 1992

3 Years, 5 Months and 2 Days in the Life Of... is the debut studio album by American hip-hop group Arrested Development. It was released on March 24, 1992, through Chrysalis Records. Named after the length of time it took the group to get a record contract, 3 Years, 5 Months and 2 Days in the Life Of... starkly contrasted the gangsta rap that ruled the hip-hop charts in 1992 (such as Dr. Dre's The Chronic), focusing on spirituality, peace and love.

Upon release, the album received praise from critics, and its chart success ignited the popularization of Southern hip-hop. It is included in Robert Dimery's book 1001 Albums You Must Hear Before You Die.

The song "Tennessee" is part of The Rock and Roll Hall of Fame's 500 Songs that Shaped Rock and Roll list.

== Critical reception ==
Professional ratings
Review scores
Source	Rating
AllMusic	4.5/5 stars
Calgary Herald	B+
Chicago Tribune	3.5/4 stars
The Encyclopedia of Popular Music	4/5 stars
Los Angeles Times	4/4 stars
Orlando Sentinel	5/5 stars
Q	3/5 stars
The Rolling Stone Album Guide	4/5 stars
Select	4/5
Spin Alternative Record Guide	7/10

3 Years, 5 Months and 2 Days in the Life Of... was released to widespread critical acclaim and was later voted as the best album of the year in The Village Voice's Pazz & Jop critics' poll. Entertainment Weekly's James Bernard gave the album an "A+" and praised it as a "fresh-sounding debut", referring to the group as "the anti-gangsta" and "perhaps rap's most self-reflective act." Greg Kot of the Chicago Tribune wrote that the group "displays unusual worldliness, wisdom and awareness on its debut, immediately establishing itself as a major new voice in hip-hop", noting Speech's social themes and rejection of "macho boasting and gangster posing". In a negative assessment, Robert Christgau of The Village Voice assigned the album a "dud" rating and wrote that the album was "not horrible by any means" but "too often the beats shambled and the raps meandered", though he would later revise his rating to single out "Tennessee" as a "choice cut".

Retrospectively, Steve Huey of AllMusic wrote that the rise of gangsta rap abruptly ended what seemed to be a "shining new era in alternative rap" heralded by 3 Years and that the album, while not "quite as revolutionary as it first seemed", was nonetheless "a fine record that often crosses the line into excellence", further crediting it as "a major influence on a new breed of alternative Southern hip-hop, including Goodie Mob, Outkast, and Nappy Roots".

The Wire named the album its record of the year, the first time the magazine had expanded its year-end critics' poll to include albums in non-jazz genres. The album was included in the book 1001 Albums You Must Hear Before You Die.

== Track listing ==
3 Years, 5 Months and 2 Days in the Life Of... track listing
No.	Title	Length
1.	"Man's Final Frontier"	2:38
2.	"Mama's Always on Stage"	3:25
3.	"People Everyday"	3:26
4.	"Blues Happy"	0:46
5.	"Mr. Wendal"	4:06
6.	"Children Play with Earth"	2:38
7.	"Raining Revolution"	3:55
8.	"Fishin' 4 Religion"	4:06
9.	"Give a Man a Fish"	4:22
10.	"U"	4:59
11.	"Eve of Reality"	1:53
12.	"Natural"	4:18
13.	"Dawn of the Dreads"	5:17
14.	"Tennessee"	4:32
15.	"Washed Away"	6:22
Total length:		56:13

Samples used

- "Mama's Always on Stage" samples "We're Ready" by Buddy Guy and Junior Wells on the album Hoodoo Man Blues, as well as "Parents Are People" by Harry Belafonte and Marlo Thomas.
- "People Everyday" interpolates "Everyday People" by Sly and the Family Stone, and samples "Tappan Zee" by Bob James.
- "Mr. Wendal" samples "Sing a Simple Song" by Sly and the Family Stone.
- "Give a Man a Fish" samples "When It Comes Down to It" by Minnie Riperton.
- "U" samples "Mighty Quinn" by Ramsey Lewis.
- "Natural" samples "Sunshine" by Earth, Wind & Fire.
- "Tennessee" samples "Alphabet St." by Prince, "Papa Was Too" by Joe Tex, "Funky Drummer" by James Brown, "BNH" by the Brand New Heavies, and "Tough" by Kurtis Blow.
- "Washed Away" samples "Thin Line Between Love and Hate" by the Persuaders.

== Personnel ==
- Arrested Development – arranger
- Baba Oje
- Brother Larry – guitar
- Montsho Eshe
- Dionne Farris – vocals
- Headliner
- Aerle Taree – stylist
- Tom Held – engineer
- Larry Jackson – saxophone
- Terrance Cinque Mason – vocals
- Rasa Don – drums
- Sister Paulette – vocals
- Speech – producer, executive producer, mixing
- Alvin Speights – engineer
- Howie Weinberg – mastering
- Richard Wells – engineer
- Lindsey Williams – project director
- Jeffrey Henson Scales – photography
- Matt Still – assistant engineer
- Randall Martin – art direction

== Charts ==
Chart performance for 3 Years, 5 Months and 2 Days in the Life Of...
Chart (1992–1993)	Peak position
Australian Albums (ARIA)	4
Canadian Albums (The Record)	3
Dutch Albums (Album Top 100)	30
German Albums (Offizielle Top 100)	32
New Zealand Albums (RMNZ)	6
Swedish Albums (Sverigetopplistan)	48
UK Albums (Official Charts)	3
US Billboard 200	7
US Top R&B/Hip-Hop Albums (Billboard)	3

== Certifications ==
Certifications for 3 Years, 5 Months and 2 Days in the Life Of...
Region	Certification	Certified units/sales
Australia (ARIA)	Platinum	70,000^{^}
Canada (Music Canada)	2× Platinum	200,000^{^}
United Kingdom (BPI)	Platinum	300,000^{^}
United States (RIAA)	4× Platinum	4,000,000^{^}
^{^} Shipments figures based on certification alone.
