= Mr. Wendal =

1992 single by Arrested Development

Single by Arrested Development

from the album 3 Years, 5 Months and 2 Days in the Life Of...
- Released: December 7, 1992
- Genre: Pop hip-hop
- Length: 4:06 (album version); 3:25 (radio edit)
- Label: EMI; Chrysalis
- Songwriters: Todd Thomas; Sylvester Stewart
- Producer: Speech

Arrested Development singles chronology
"People Everyday" (1992)	"Mr. Wendal" (1992)	"Revolution" (1992)

Music video
- "Mr. Wendal" on YouTube

"Mr. Wendal" is a song by American rap group Arrested Development from their debut album, 3 Years, 5 Months and 2 Days in the Life Of... (1992). In Europe and Australia, it was issued as a double A-side with their following single, "Revolution", and released in December 1992. In the United States, "Mr. Wendal" peaked at number six on the Billboard Hot 100, selling 500,000 copies and earning a gold certification. Worldwide, it reached the top 10 in Australia, Ireland, New Zealand, and the United Kingdom. The song's music video was directed by Keith Ward and received a nomination at the 1994 Soul Train Music Awards.

== Critical reception ==
Upon the release, Larry Flick from Billboard magazine named "Mr. Wendal" "another gem". He explained, "Once again, lyrics that realistically reflect the strife and struggle of survival during these racially tense times are woven into an easy-going pop/hip hop groove. Icing on the cake are rich and soulful vocals at the chorus." Dave Sholin from the Gavin Report found that the song is "entertaining, thought-provoking and cutting-edge". Sharon O'Connell from Melody Maker wrote, "Rap taken off the streets and made new and rural. Arrested Development are tribal, lightly pulsing proof that it's possible to deliver a punchy message and hang mellow all the while, and this is mainman Speech's social concern for the homeless couched in the funkiest earthiest tones imaginable."

A reviewer from Music Week stated that the follow-up to "People Everyday" is "a wordy, worthy successor", adding, "There's no familiar tune to latch on to this time, just a doodling instrumental in which they leave — for a rap groove, at least — some sizable gaps, giving the track room to breathe." The magazine also wrote that the song "will be a considerable hit." Barbara Ellen from NME named it Single of the Week, commenting, "'Mr Wendal' is a dry, nuclear cool, non-hectoring rap concerned with highlighting the street smart sagacity of your average bin-perusing tramp. Almost Cowardian in its delivery, the song's appeal has little to do with bluster or glitter and a lot to do with an elegant storytelling stance that shines like pure gold in rap's hype-infested waters." Another NME editor, Angus Batey, felt it "is spoilt by being an exact copy" of De La Soul's "Eye Know". Mark Sutherland from Smash Hits gave it a full score of five out of five and named it Best New Single, describing it as a "deliciously laidback rap number".

== Music video ==
The song's accompanying music video was directed by Keith Ward. It was nominated in the category for Best R&B Music Video at the 1994 Soul Train Music Awards.

== Legacy ==
"Mr. Wendal" was awarded one of BMI's Pop Awards in 1994, honoring the songwriters, composers and music publishers of the song.

== Charts ==
=== Weekly charts ===
Chart (1992–1993)	Peak position
Australia (ARIA)	7
Canada Top Singles (RPM)	34
Canada Dance/Urban (RPM)	1
Canada Retail Singles (The Record)	4
Europe (Eurochart Hot 100)	15
Europe (European Dance Radio)	1
Europe (European Hit Radio)	20
France (SNEP)	30
Germany (GfK)	31
Ireland (IRMA)	9
Israel (Israeli Singles Chart)	22
Netherlands (Dutch Top 40 Tipparade)	5
Netherlands (Single Top 100)	42
New Zealand (Recorded Music NZ)	2
UK Singles (Official Charts)	4
UK Airplay (Music Week)	6
UK Dance (Music Week)	2
UK Club Chart (Music Week)	2
US Billboard Hot 100	6
US Dance Club Songs (Billboard)	1
US Dance Singles Sales (Billboard)	27
US Hot R&B/Hip-Hop Songs (Billboard)	6
US Hot Rap Songs (Billboard)	4
US Pop Airplay (Billboard)	10
US Rhythmic Airplay (Billboard)	5
US Cash Box Top 100	5

=== Year-end charts ===
Chart (1993)	Position
Australia (ARIA)	59
Canada Dance/Urban (RPM)	18
New Zealand (RIANZ)	14
UK Singles (OCC)	87
UK Club Chart (Music Week)	48
US Billboard Hot 100	31
US Dance Club Play (Billboard)	41
US Hot R&B Singles (Billboard)	25
US Cash Box Top 100	28

== Certifications ==
Region	Certification	Certified units/sales
Australia (ARIA)	Gold	35,000^{^}
New Zealand (RMNZ)	Gold	5,000^{*}
United States (RIAA)	Gold	500,000
^{*} Sales figures based on certification alone.^{^} Shipments figures based on certification alone.
