= Alec Foege =

American author and magazine journalist

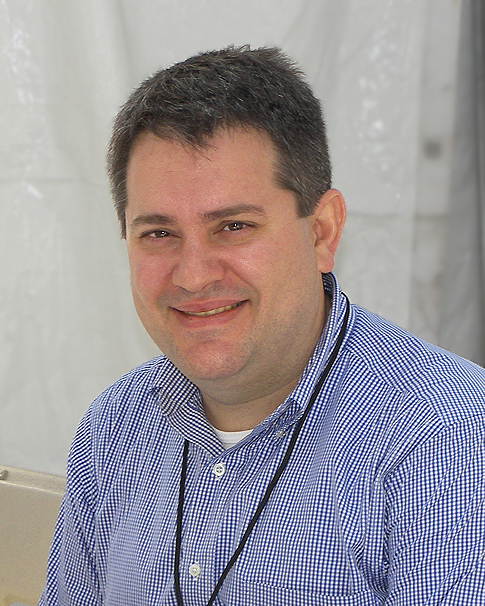
Alec Foege at the 2008 Texas Book Festival.

Alec Foege is an American author and magazine journalist.

== Career ==
A former contributing editor to Rolling Stone and senior writer for People magazine, he is the author of four books. His writing has also appeared in The New York Times, Guitar World, People, Mediaweek, Adweek, Fortune, Small Business, Spin, Variety, Vogue, and Corporate Counsel. He is the founder and director of Brookside Research LLC.

== Personal ==
Foege resides in Connecticut. He graduated from Columbia University. Foege is the son of Norma and Kenneth Foege and grew up in Rye, New York.

== Publications ==
- Confusion Is Next: The Sonic Youth Story (St. Martin's, 1994)
- The Empire God Built: Inside Pat Robertson's Media Machine (Wiley, 1996)
- Right of the Dial: The Rise of Clear Channel and the Fall of Commercial Radio (Faber and Faber/Farrar, Straus & Giroux, 2008).
- The Tinkerers: The Amateurs, DIYers, and Inventors Who Make America Great (2013)
