= Arrested Development (group) =

American alternative hip hop group

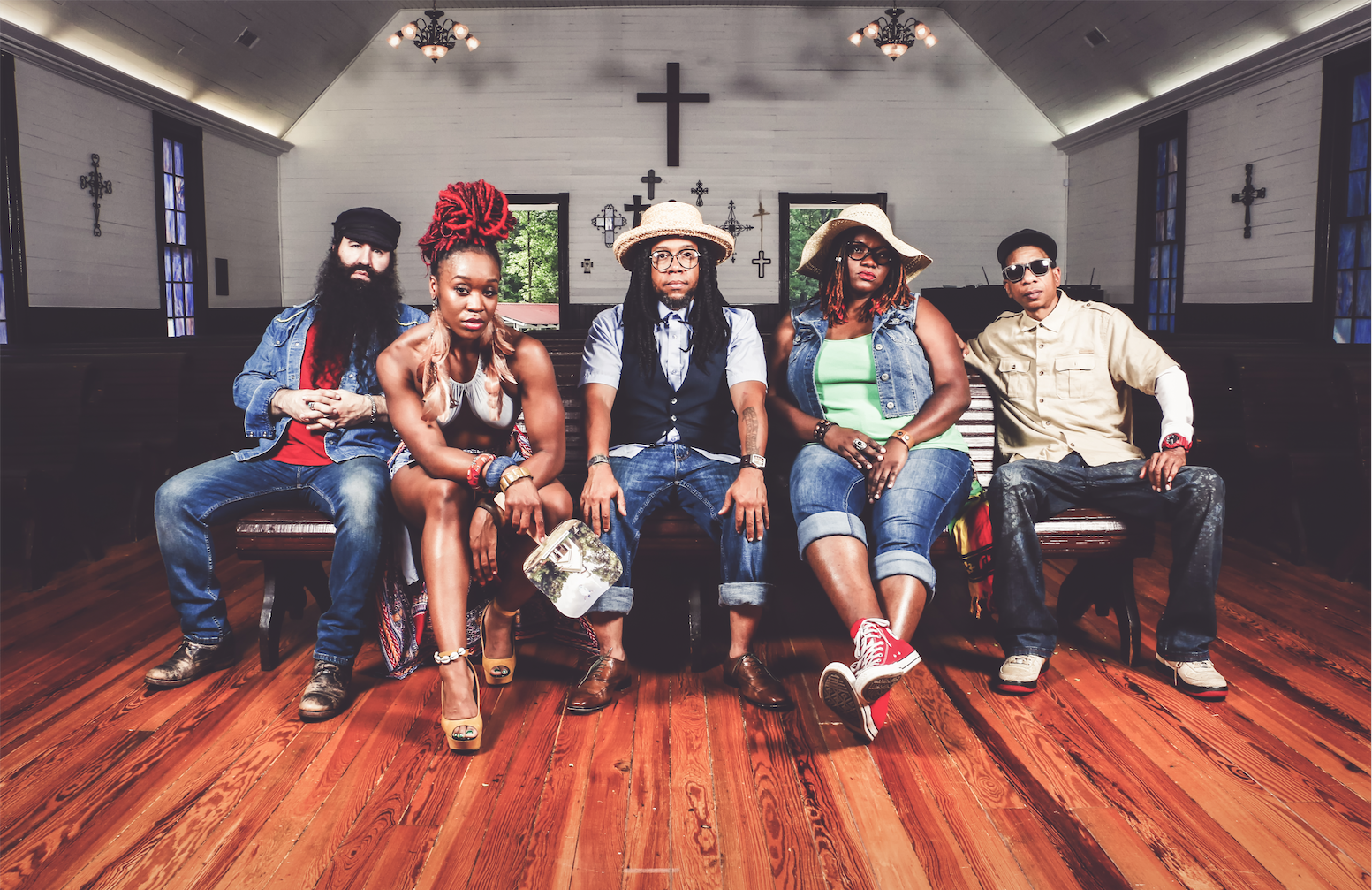
- 2018 Arrested Development promo picture

Background information
- Origin: Atlanta, Georgia, U.S.
- Genres: Hip-hop; progressive rap
- Years active: 1988–1996, 2000–present
- Labels: Vagabond Records & Tapes; Chrysalis
- Members: Speech; One Love; Jason "JJ Boogie" Reichert; Fareedah Aleem; Tasha Larae
- Past members: Headliner; Kamaal Malak; Montsho Eshe; Astrid Maure; Nyasa Sullivan; Aerle Taree; Ajile; Kwesi Asuo; Nadirah Shakoor; Foley; Rasa Don; Baba Oje; Nicha Hilliard; Isaiah "Za" Williams; Dionne Farris
- Website: www.arresteddevelopmentmusic.com

Arrested Development is an American hip-hop group formed in 1988 in Atlanta by rapper and producer Speech and turntablist Headliner. The group offered an Afrocentric, socially conscious alternative to the rise of gangsta rap, and gained critical and commercial success with its 1992 debut album, 3 Years, 5 Months and 2 Days in the Life Of.... The album topped the Village Voice's Pazz & Jop Critics' Poll and reportedly sold over 6 million copies globally. In 1993, Arrested Development became the first hip-hop act to win the Grammy Award for Best New Artist, also receiving the award for Best Rap Performance by a Duo or Group.

After the commercial disappointment of their 1994 follow-up, Zingalamaduni, the group disbanded in 1996. They reunited in 2000 and have continued to tour and release music independently through Speech's label, addressing themes of racial justice, spirituality, and environmental issues.

== History ==
=== Formation and early success (1988–1994) ===
Arrested Development was formed in 1988 by rapper and producer Todd Thomas ("Speech") and turntablist Timothy Barnwell (known as Headliner). Baba Oje and frontman Speech met at the University of Wisconsin–Milwaukee when they were both students.

The group's debut album 3 Years, 5 Months and 2 Days in the Life Of... was the number-one album in the Village Voice's 1992 Pazz and Jop Critic's Poll and in The Wire's 1992 Critic's choice. The group won two Grammy Awards in 1993: for Best New Artist, making them the first hip-hop artist to win this award, and for Best Rap Performance by a Duo or Group. They were also named Band of the Year by Rolling Stone. The debut album sold over 6 million copies worldwide.

A few months later, the group was approached by film director Spike Lee to compose a song for his upcoming biopic based on the life of Malcolm X. The group then recorded "Revolution", which appeared on the soundtrack for the film as well as the second half of its closing credits when the film was released in 1992.

Their 1994 follow-up, Zingalamaduni, sold poorly, and they broke up shortly after in 1996.

=== Reunion and legal disputes (2000–2008) ===
The group reunited in 2000, touring and releasing records via Speech's Vagabond Productions, but Aerle Taree did not return due to vocal problems. Today, Aerle is a poet and converted from Buddhism to Christianity. DJ Headliner started his own business named Creative Royalty Group.

In November 2003, the group sued the Fox network over the name of the TV show Arrested Development. The suit is referenced in the Arrested Development episodes "Public Relations", "Motherboy XXX", "Sword of Destiny", and "For British Eyes Only".

In June 2005, the group won the first round of the television series contest, Hit Me, Baby, One More Time, performing "Tennessee" and covering Los Lonely Boys' "Heaven" and donated the $20,000 proceeds to UNICEF.

The group's follow-up to their 2004 Among the Trees was Since the Last Time, released internationally on September 18, 2006. Since the Last Time was released in the United States on October 30, 2007, on Vagabond Record & Tapes, Speech's boutique label.

In March 2007, they toured Australia as part of a triple-bill, along with Simple Minds and INXS. In 2008, Arrested Development teamed with The Black Eyed Peas and performed at The Concert for Peace in Jerusalem, Israel, to promote peace among Palestinians and Israelis. Also in 2008, Arrested Development visited and sang with Debbie Peagler, an incarcerated survivor of domestic violence, and the inmate gospel choir that Peagler led at a California women's prison. Their visit was meant to support Peagler's legal battle for her release from prison and call attention to the plight of other victims of abuse and wrongful incarceration. The collaborative performance is included in Yoav Potash's documentary film Crime After Crime.

=== Later career (2009–present) ===
In 2010, the group released their ninth album Strong under Vagabond Records and Tapes, and licensed to the Japanese record label Cutting Edge, on December 9, 2009, and had a top 10 hit in Japan with the single "The World Is Changing". In an interview with Songfacts, Speech explained that the track "Greener" takes on the issue of climate change from the perspective of the African-American community. On October 14, 2010, Baba Oje had a stroke.

On January 8, 2011, they performed with Emmylou Harris at the festival first night of the Sydney Festival in Sydney, Australia to 50,000 people. In August 2012, the group released its tenth album Standing at the Crossroads, recorded while touring internationally. The album, given away for free from the group's official website, took a lo-fi approach and was recorded entirely on a Mac laptop. The same month, they announced a new tour throughout the United States and Australia to celebrate their 20th anniversary.

On October 9, 2016, Arrested Development performed at the Delicious Festival in South Africa. A line up that included The Jacksons, Macy Gray, De La Soul, Elements of Life, Roy Ayers and local food celebrities Reuben Riffel and Sarah Graham. The next day, members of Arrested Development drove to an orphanage in Soweto, then paid homage to Nelson Mandela at his home.

In January 2018, Arrested Development performed on the Trumpet Awards television show. In 2018, 16 Bars, a documentary that follows prison inmates as they undertake musical projects, was made.

Baba Oje died of leukemia on October 26, 2018. His age was reported to be 86 or 87. In October 2018, Speech released The Nigga Factory, a three-part docuseries exploring themes of racism and Afrocentrism. Later that year, they also released the album Craft & Optics.

On September 5, 2019, Arrested Development was given an award from Black Music Honors, which acknowledges artists that have made a significant contribution to African-American music.

On December 11, 2023, the group released the song Hip Hop Saves Lives featuring Chuck D & Grandmaster Caz. The record was produced by Configa.

== Personnel ==
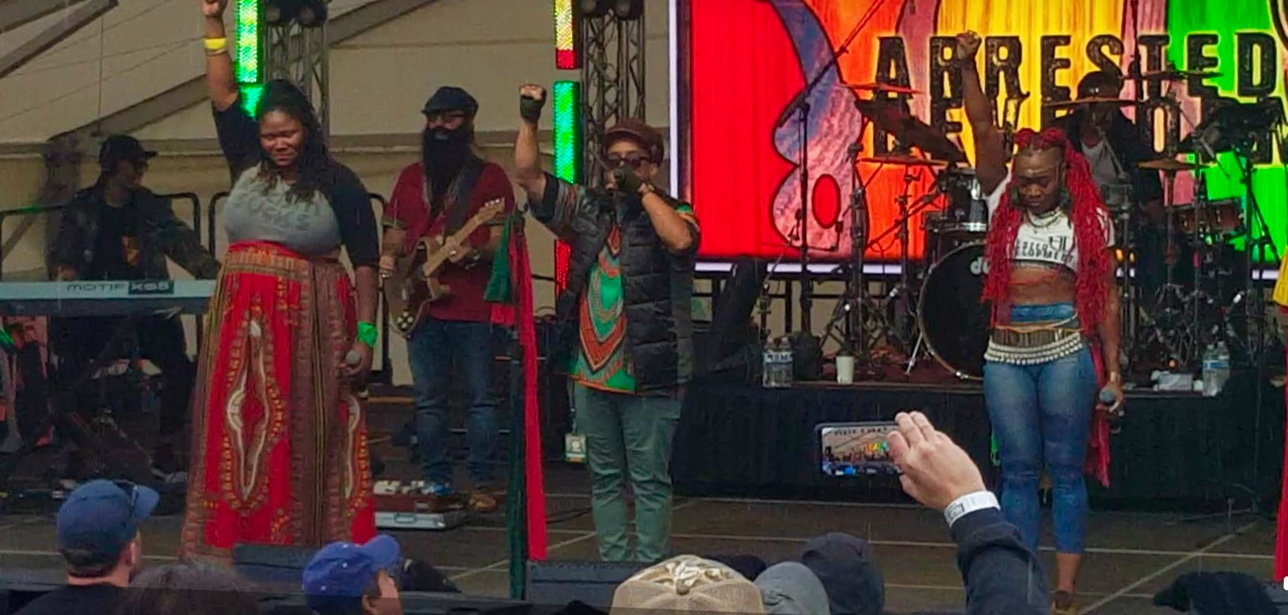
Live in 2018

=== Current members ===
- Speech – lead vocals, production (1988–present)
- Jason "JJ Boogie" Reichert – guitar, mix engineering, production (2000–present)
- One Love – vocals (2001–present)
- Fareedah Aleem – vocals, dancing, choreography (2004–present)
- Tasha Larae – vocals (2008–2021, 2023–present)
- Montsho Eshe – dancing, choreography, vocals (1990–1996, 2023–present)

=== Former members ===
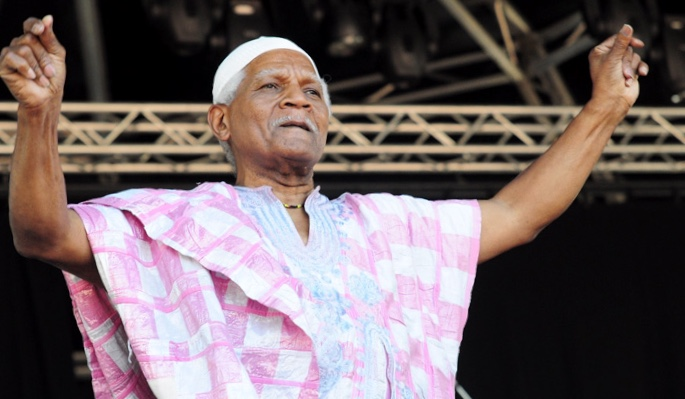
Baba Oje onstage in 2009

- Headliner – turntables (1988–1996)
- Baba Oje – spiritual elder (1990–1996, 2000–2018; his death)
- Rasa Don – drums, vocals (1990–1996, 2000–2006)
- Aerle Taree – vocals, stylist (1990–1996)
- Dionne Farris – vocals (1992)
- Ajile – vocals (1994–1995)
- Foley – bass (1994–1996)
- Kamaal Malak – bass (1994–1996)
- Kwesi Asuo – vocals (1994–1996)
- Nadirah Shakoor – vocals (1994–1996)
- Isaiah 'Za' Williams III – bass (1996, 2000–2018)
- Nicha Hilliard – vocals, dancing (1996, 2000–2008)
- April Allen – vocals (2021–2023)

== Discography ==
=== Albums ===
Year	Album details	Peak chart positions								Certifications
Year	Album details	US	US R&B	AUS	GER	NED	NZ	SWE	UK	Certifications
1992	3 Years, 5 Months and 2 Days in the Life Of...: Label: Chrysalis	7	3	4	32	30	6	48	3	RIAA: 4× Platinum; ARIA: Platinum; BPI: Platinum; MC: 2× Platinum
1993	Unplugged: Label: Chrysalis	60	38	18	—	—	26	—	40	RIAA: Gold
1994	Zingalamaduni: Label: Chrysalis	55	20	34	34	54	—	31	16	BPI: Silver
2000	Da Feelin' EP: Label: EMI	—	—	—	—	—	—	—	—	
2001	Heroes of the Harvest: Label: Vagabond Productions	—	—	—	—	—	—	—	—	
2003	Extended Revolution: Label: Stateside Records	—	—	—	—	—	—	—	—	
2004	Among the Trees: Label: Vagabond Productions	—	—	—	98	—	—	—	—	
2006	Since the Last Time: Label: Vagabond Productions	—	—	—	—	—	—	—	—	
2010	Strong: Label: Cutting Edge	—	—	—	—	—	—	—	—	
2012	Standing at the Crossroads: Label: Vagabond Productions	—	—	—	—	—	—	—	—	
2016	Changing the Narrative: Label: Vagabond Productions	—	—	—	—	—	—	—	—	
2016	This Was Never Home: Label: Vagabond Productions	—	—	—	—	—	—	—	—	
2018	Craft & Optics: Label: Vagabond Productions	—	—	—	—	—	—	—	—	
2020	Don't Fight Your Demons: Label: Vagabond Productions	—	—	—	—	—	—	—	—	
2021	For the Fkn Love: Label: Vagabond Productions	—	—	—	—	—	—	—	—	
2024	Bullets In The Chamber: Label: Vagabond Productions	—	—	—	—	—	—	—	—	
2025	Adult Contemporary Hip Hop: Label: Vagabond Productions	—	—	—	—	—	—	—	—	

==== Compilations ====
- 1998: Best of Arrested Development
- 2001: Greatest Hits

=== Singles ===
Year	Title	Peak chart positions										Certifications	Album
Year	Title	US	US Hip-Hop	US Dance	AUS	FRA	GER	NED	NZ	SWE	UK	Certifications	Album
1992	"Tennessee"	6	1	34	14	—	27	34	12	24	18	RIAA: Gold	3 Years, 5 Months & 2 Days in the Life Of...
1992	"People Everyday"	8	2	6	6	6	—	20	6	27	2	RIAA: Gold; ARIA: Gold; BPI: Silver	3 Years, 5 Months & 2 Days in the Life Of...
1992	"Mr. Wendal"	6	6	1	7	30	31	42	2	—	4	RIAA: Gold; ARIA: Gold	3 Years, 5 Months & 2 Days in the Life Of...
1992	"Revolution"	90	49	—	7	30	31	42	2	—	4		Malcolm X (Music from the Motion Picture Soundtrack)
1993	"Natural"	—	90	—	59	—	—	—	34	—	—		3 Years, 5 Months & 2 Days in the Life Of...
1993	"Mama's Always on Stage"	—	—	—	—	—	—	22	—	—	—		3 Years, 5 Months & 2 Days in the Life Of...
1994	"United Front"	—	66	—	—	—	—	—	—	—	—		Zingalamaduni
1994	"Ease My Mind"	45	14	—	43	—	—	—	11	—	33		Zingalamaduni
1994	"Africa's Inside Me"	—	—	—	—	—	—	—	—	—	—		Zingalamaduni
2000	"If Dey Ask"	—	—	—	—	—	—	—	—	—	—		Da Feelin' EP
2000	"Hit the Road Jack"	—	—	—	—	—	—	—	—	—	—		Heroes of the Harvest
2004	"Honeymoon Day"	—	—	—	—	—	—	—	—	—	—		Among the Trees
2005	"A Lotta Things to Do"	—	—	—	—	—	—	—	—	—	—		Among the Trees
2006	"Down & Dirty (Clap Your Hands)"	—	—	—	—	—	—	—	—	—	—		Since the Last Time
2006	"Miracles"	—	—	—	—	—	—	—	—	—	—		Since the Last Time
2010	"The World Is Changing"	—	—	—	—	—	—	—	—	—	—		Strong
2011	"Living"	—	—	—	—	—	—	—	—	—	—		Standing at the Crossroads
2016	"Up"	—	—	—	—	—	—	—	—	—	—		This Was Never Home
2016	"I Don't See You at the Club"	—	—	—	—	—	—	—	—	—	—		Changing the Narrative
2018	"In 1 Day (Whole World Changed)"	—	—	—	—	—	—	—	—	—	—		Craft & Optics
2020	"Becoming" (with Configa)	—	—	—	—	—	—	—	—	—	—		Don't Fight Your Demons
2021	"Vibe" (with Big Daddy Kane)	—	—	—	—	—	—	—	—	—	—		For The FKN Love

== Awards and nominations ==
=== Grammy Awards ===
Year	Nominated work	Award	Result
1993	Arrested Development	Best New Artist	Won
1993	"Tennessee"	Best Rap Performance by a Duo or Group	Won
1993	"People Everyday"	Best R&B Performance by a Duo or Group	Nominated
1994	"Revolution"	Best Rap Performance by a Duo or Group	Nominated
1995	"Ease My Mind"	Best Rap Performance by a Duo or Group	Nominated

=== MTV Video Music Awards ===
Year	Nominated work	Award	Result
1992	"Tennessee"	Best Rap Video	Won
1992	Arrested Development	Best New Artist in a Video	Nominated
1993	"People Everyday"	Best Rap Video	Won
1993	"Revolution"	Best Video From a Film	Nominated

=== American Music Awards ===
Year	Nominated work	Award	Result
1993	Arrested Development	Favorite Pop/Rock New Artist	Nominated
1993	Arrested Development	Favorite R&B/Soul New Artist	Nominated
1993	Arrested Development	Favorite Rap/Hip-Hop New Artist	Nominated
1994	Arrested Development	Favorite R&B/Soul Band, Duo, or Group	Nominated
1994	Arrested Development	Favorite Rap/Hip-Hop Artist	Nominated

=== Soul Train Music Awards ===
Year	Nominated work	Award	Result
1993	3 Years, 5 Months and 2 Days in the Life Of...	Best R&B/Soul Album – Group, Band, or Duo	Nominated
1993	"Tennessee"	Best R&B/Soul Single – Group, Band, or Duo	Nominated
1993	"Tennessee"	Song of the Year	Nominated
1993	"People Everyday"	Best Music Video	Nominated
1993	Arrested Development	Best New R&B/Soul Artist	Nominated
1993	3 Years, 5 Months and 2 Days in the Life Of...	Best Rap Album	Won
1994	"Mr. Wendal"	Best R&B Music Video	Nominated
1994	Unplugged	Best Rap Album	Nominated

== See also ==
- List of number-one R&B hits (United States)
- List of number-one dance hits (United States)
- List of artists who reached number one on the U.S. dance chart

Awards and achievements
Preceded by Marc Cohn	Grammy Award for Best New Artist; 1993	Succeeded by Toni Braxton
Preceded by DJ Jazzy Jeff & the Fresh Prince	Grammy Award for Best Rap Performance by a Duo or Group; 1993	Succeeded by Digable Planets
