= Speech (rapper) =

American rapper

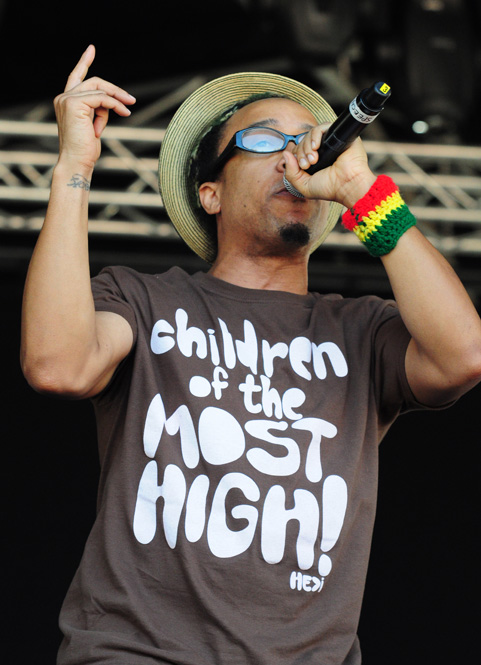
- Speech with Arrested Development in 2009

Background information
- Born: Todd Thomas; October 25, 1968 (age 57); Milwaukee, Wisconsin, U.S.
- Genres: Hip hop
- Occupations: Rapper; singer; songwriter
- Years active: 1984–present
- Label: Chrysalis/EMI
- Member of: Arrested Development
- Website: speechmusic.com

Todd Thomas (born October 25, 1968), better known by the stage name Speech, is an American rapper. He is a member of the progressive hip hop group Arrested Development and has released a number of solo albums.

== Early life ==
Speech was born in Milwaukee, Wisconsin, and spent his childhood years there and in Ripley, Tennessee, before relocating to Georgia in 1987 to attend the Art Institute of Atlanta. He attended Rufus King High School and the University of Wisconsin-Milwaukee. His first rap group, Attack, was active from 1984 until 1986. He also DJ'd at a popular teen club called the Fox Trap along with other guest DJs.

== Music career ==
=== Arrested Development ===
In 1987, Speech joined with fellow DJ Headliner to form the group Arrested Development. After over three years together, the group released their inaugural album, 3 Years, 5 Months & 2 Days in the Life Of.... Speech performed lead vocals, and produced the group's tracks. The group's follow-up album, Zingalamaduni, fared poorly by comparison, but was critically acclaimed. In a four star review, Rolling Stone wrote that "Speech still has a gift for the swinging rhythms and decent expressions that get past the differences that divide the pop audience." Speech went on to pursue his solo career, also starting Vagabond Productions as a vehicle for Arrested Development and their business dealings, and became a promoter of neo soul, hip-hop, and rock concerts in Atlanta. The company then switched to representing artists in U.S. and Japan. Since then, Vagabond has become an all around production house that presents music to various labels and digital outlets across the world.

In 2000, Speech also reunited with Arrested Development (without the participation of DJ Headliner or Aerle Taree).

=== Solo ===
His debut solo album, Speech, on Chrysalis/EMI, was released January 23, 1996. "Like Marvin Said (What's Going On)", released by EMI Records in November 1995, was the first single from the album. From March to May 1996, Speech toured Japan, Guadeloupe, Amsterdam, and several areas of the U.S. "Like Marvin Said" was a No. 1 hit in Japan for seven weeks. In December 1996, Speech became a disciple of Jesus Christ within the International Churches of Christ. Speech did various shows with Herbie Hancock, Chaka Khan, Youssou N'dour, James Brown, Parliament – Funkadelic, Jason Mraz, and The Roots. The musical side of Speech kept him producing and writing songs for progressive artists like Zap Mama, Spike Lee's Malcolm X soundtrack, and Boomerang starring Eddie Murphy. He was in other movies like Bebe's Kids, Warriors of Virtue, Whipped, and the Michael Jordan documentary To the Max (an IMAX production). He built a home studio called the Podium in Fayetteville, Georgia. He licensed his second solo album in 1998, 1998 Hoopla, to Toshiba EMI in Japan. Hoopla was later released in 1999 in the United States on TVT Records. In 2000, Speech recorded and licensed to Toshiba EMI his third solo project entitled Spiritual People, which garnered his biggest solo album sales to date, being certified gold by the RIAJ in November 2000. Speech followed up with various sold-out tours and heavy promotional schedules. Spiritual People was later released in the United States in 2001 on ArtistDirect. Speech then licensed to Toshiba EMI, Down South Produckshuns which spawned another top 10 hit entitled "Braided Hair." Vagabond Productions later released a Speech solo compilation of Down South Produckshun songs, Spiritual People songs (U.S. version) and songs from Arrested Development's Among the Trees album, entitled The Vagabond in 2006. That album was released on Bluhammock records and won in The 6th Annual Independent Music Awards for Best Rap/Hip-Hop Album.

Speech toured with US Vice President Al Gore and First Lady Hillary Clinton in the South during the 1996 United States Presidential election. Speech was also invited to and attended the inaugural celebrations. In November 1996, he toured with Hootie and the Blowfish.

In addition to touring and releasing his own albums, Speech has performed on several other projects including 1 Giant Leap and collaborating with Zap Mama on "Each Step Moves Us On".

== Publications ==
- What Is Success?. Vagabond Records and Tapes, 2009.

== Discography ==
=== Solo albums ===
- Speech (1996), Chrysalis
- Hoopla (1998), TVT
- Spiritual People (2000), Toshiba EMI
- Down South Produckshuns (2002), Toshiba EMI
- Peechy (2003), Toshiba EMI
- The Vagabond (2005), Bluhammock
- The Grown Folks Table (2009), Vagabond Records and Tapes
- Expansion (2020), Vagabond Record and Tapes
