= LeVert discography =

- Studio albums: 7
- Singles: 23

The discography of LeVert, an American contemporary R&B group, consists of seven studio albums and twenty-three singles. Four of their albums (The Big Throwdown, Just Coolin', Rope a Dope Style and For Real Tho') have been certified gold by the RIAA. The group's only pop hit in the United States was "Casanova", which peaked at #5 on the Billboard Hot 100 in 1987.

== Albums ==
=== Studio albums ===
Year	Album details	Peak chart positions				Certifications
Year	Album details	US	US R&B	CAN	UK	Certifications
1985	I Get Hot: Release date: May 1985; Label: Tempre	—	—	—	—	
1986	Bloodline: Release date: August 4, 1986; Label: Atlantic	192	8	—	—	
1987	The Big Throwdown: Release date: July 27, 1987; Label: Atlantic	32	3	89	86	US: Gold
1988	Just Coolin': Release date: October 18, 1988; Label: Atlantic	79	6	—	—	US: Gold
1990	Rope a Dope Style: Release date: October 16, 1990; Label: Atlantic	122	9	—	—	US: Gold
1993	For Real Tho': Release date: March 16, 1993; Label: Atlantic	35	3	—	—	US: Gold
1997	The Whole Scenario: Release date: February 28, 1997; Label: Atlantic	49	10	—	—	
"—" denotes a recording that did not chart or was not released in that territory.

=== Compilation albums ===
- The Best of LeVert (2001, Rhino)
- Just Coolin' and Other Hits (2004, Rhino)

== Singles ==
Year	Single	Peak chart positions					Album
Year	Single	US	US R&B	US Dan	CAN	UK	Album
1985	"I'm Still"	—	70	—	—	—	I Get Hot
1985	"All in the Way You Dance"	—	—	—	—	—	I Get Hot
1985	"Dancing with You"	—	—	—	—	—	I Get Hot
1986	"(Pop, Pop, Pop, Pop) Goes My Mind"	—	1	—	—	—	Bloodline
1986	"Let's Go Out Tonight"	—	14	—	—	—	Bloodline
1987	"Fascination"	—	26	—	—	—	Bloodline
1987	"Casanova"	5	1	27	11	9	The Big Throwdown
1987	"My Forever Love"	—	2	—	—	—	The Big Throwdown
1988	"Sweet Sensation"	—	4	—	—	—	The Big Throwdown
1988	"Addicted to You"	—	1	—	—	—	Just Coolin'
1988	"Pull Over"	—	2	—	—	—	Just Coolin'
1989	"Just Coolin'" (featuring Heavy D)	—	1	19	—	—	Just Coolin'
1989	"Gotta Get the Money"	—	4	—	—	—	Just Coolin'
1989	"Smilin'"	—	16	—	—	—	Just Coolin'
1990	"Rope a Dope Style"	—	7	—	—	—	Rope a Dope Style
1990	"All Season"	—	4	—	—	—	Rope a Dope Style
1991	"Baby I'm Ready"	—	1	—	—	—	Rope a Dope Style
1991	"Give a Little Love"	—	63	—	—	—	Rope a Dope Style
1993	"Good Ol' Days"	78	12	—	—	—	For Real Tho'
1993	"ABC-123"	46	5	—	—	—	For Real Tho'
1993	"Do the Thangs"	—	41	—	—	—	For Real Tho'
1997	"Tru Dat" (featuring Yo-Yo & Queen Pen)	107	52	—	—	—	The Whole Scenario
1997	"Sorry Is" (featuring Terry Ellis)	113	33	—	—	—	The Whole Scenario
"—" denotes a recording that did not chart or was not released in that territory.

=== As featured artist ===
Year	Single	Peak position	Album
Year	Single	US R&B	Album
1991	"For the Love of Money" / "Living for the City" (medley) (with Troop featuring Queen Latifah)	12	New Jack City

== Music videos ==
Year	Video	Director
1993	"ABC-123"	Paul Hunter
