= 1988 Soul Train Music Awards =

Music awards ceremony in Los Angeles, US

Soul Train Music Awards
- Date: March 30, 1988
- Location: Santa Monica Civic Auditorium, Los Angeles, California
- Country: United States
- Hosted by: Dionne Warwick
- First award: 1987

Highlights
- Most awards: Michael Jackson, LL Cool J and LeVert (2)
- Website: soultrain.com

Television/radio coverage
- Network: WGN America

The 1988 Soul Train Music Awards were held on March 30, 1988, at the Santa Monica Civic Auditorium in Los Angeles, California. The show was broadcast live in select cities and aired later in other areas. Dionne Warwick hosted.

== Special Award ==
=== Heritage Award for Career Achievement ===
- Gladys Knight & the Pips

== Winners and nominees ==
Winners are in bold text.

=== Album of the Year – Male ===
- **Michael Jackson – Bad**
  - Alexander O'Neal – Hearsay
  - Prince – Sign o' the Times
  - Stevie Wonder – Characters

=== Album of the Year – Female ===
- **Whitney Houston – Whitney**
  - Natalie Cole – Everlasting
  - Jody Watley – Jody Watley
  - Angela Winbush – Sharp

=== Album of the Year – Group or Band ===
- **LeVert – The Big Throwdown**
  - Earth, Wind & Fire – Touch the World
  - Gladys Knight & the Pips – All Our Love
  - The Whispers – Just Gets Better with Time

=== Best Single – Male ===
- **Michael Jackson – "Bad"**
  - Prince – "U Got the Look"
  - Luther Vandross – "So Amazing"
  - Stevie Wonder – "Skeletons"

=== Best Single – Female ===
- **Natalie Cole – "I Live for Your Love"**
  - Janet Jackson – "The Pleasure Principle"
  - Jody Watley – "Looking for a New Love"
  - Angela Winbush – "Angel"

=== Best Single – Group or Band ===
- **LeVert – "Casanova"**
  - Atlantic Starr – "Always"
  - Earth, Wind & Fire – "System of Survival"
  - The Whispers – "Rock Steady"

=== Best Rap Single ===
- **LL Cool J – "I Need Love"**
  - Dana Dane – "Cinderfella Dana Dane"
  - The Fat Boys – "Wipeout"
  - Kool Moe Dee – "How Ya Like Me Now"

=== Best Music Video ===
- **Janet Jackson – "Control"**
  - Whitney Houston – "I Wanna Dance with Somebody (Who Loves Me)"
  - Michael Jackson – "The Way You Make Me Feel"
  - Jody Watley – "Looking for a New Love"

=== Best New Artist ===
- **Miki Howard**
  - Terence Trent D'Arby
  - Exposé
  - Shanice Wilson

=== Best Rap Album ===
- **LL Cool J – Bigger and Deffer**
  - Eric B. & Rakim – Paid in Full
  - Heavy D & the Boyz – Living Large
  - Whodini – Open Sesame

=== Best Gospel Album – Solo ===
- **Vanessa Bell Armstrong – Following Jesus**
  - Shirley Caesar – Her Very Best
  - Aretha Franklin – One Lord, One Faith, One Baptism
  - Al Green – Soul Survivor

=== Best Gospel Album – Group or Choir ===
- **The Winans – Decisions**
  - Reverend Milton Brunson and The Thompson Community Singers – If I Be Lifted
  - Commissioned – Go Tell Somebody
  - The Clark Sisters – Heart and Soul

=== Best Jazz Album – Solo ===
- **Najee – Najee's Theme**
  - Jonathan Butler – Jonathan Butler
  - Dexter Gordon – The Other Side of Round Midnight
  - David Sanborn – A Change of Heart

=== Best Jazz Album – Group or Band ===
- **Hiroshima – Go**
  - George Benson and Earl Klugh – Collaboration
  - Freddie Hubbard – Life Flight
  - Pat Metheny Group – Still Life (Talking)

== Performers ==
- Alexander O'Neal – "Fake"
- Natalie Cole – "Pink Cadillac"
- Kool Moe Dee – "How Ya Like Me Now"
- The Whispers –
- Smokey Robinson – "Love Don't Give No Reason"
- LL Cool J – "I Need Love"
- Hiroshima and George Duke – "Go"
- Gladys Knight & the Pips Tribute:
  - Ronald Isley – "Neither One of Us (Wants to Be the First to Say Goodbye)"
  - Chaka Khan – "The Nitty Gritty"
  - Angela Winbush – "Midnight Train to Georgia"
  - Stephanie Mills – "If I Were Your Woman"
- Dionne Warwick and Howard Hewett – "Another Chance to Love"
- Patti LaBelle and the Edwin Hawkins Singers – "How I Got Over"
- Gladys Knight & the Pips – "Love Overboard"
