= Ronald Isley discography =

The discography of American recording artist, songwriter and record producer Ronald Isley consists of three studio albums, four singles as a primary artist and six singles as a featured artist.

== Studio albums ==
List of studio albums, with selected chart positions, sales figures and certifications
Title	Album details	Peak chart positions	
Title	Album details	US	US R&B
Here I Am (with Burt Bacharach)	Released: November 11, 2003; Label: DreamWorks; Formats: CD, digital download	73	22
Mr. I	Released: November 30, 2010; Label: Def Jam; Formats: CD, digital download	50	11
This Song Is for You	Released: July 16, 2013; Label: RI Top Ten/Notive/E1; Formats: CD, digital download	27	9
Make Me Say It Again, Girl (credits with The Isley Brothers)	Released: September 30, 2022 (Digital); Label: RI Top Ten/Stem (digital), BFD/BSMF (CD, LP); Formats: CD, LP, digital download	—	—

== Singles ==
List of singles, with selected chart positions and certifications, showing year released and album name
Title	Year	Peak chart positions			Album
Title	Year	US	US R&B	US Adult R&B	Album
"No More"	2010	—	70	18	Mr. I
"What I Miss the Most"	2010	—	79	—	Mr. I
"Dinner and a Movie"	2013	—	35	9	This Song Is for You
"My Favorite Thing" (featuring KEM)	2013	—	23	5	This Song Is for You
"Friends & Family" (featuring Snoop Dogg)	2022	—	45	13	Make Me Say It Again, Girl
"Make Me Say It Again, Girl" (with the Isley Brothers featuring Beyoncé)	2022	—	9	1	Make Me Say It Again, Girl
"The Plug" (with the Isley Brothers) featuring 2 Chainz)	2023	—	—	24	Make Me Say It Again, Girl
"Last Time" (with the Isley Brothers)	2023	—	27	7	Make Me Say It Again, Girl
"—" denotes a recording that did not chart or was not released in that territory.

=== As featured artist ===
List of singles as featured artist, with selected chart positions and certifications, showing year released and album name
Title	Year	Peak chart positions		Album
Title	Year	US	US R&B	Album
"Down Low (Nobody Has to Know)" (R. Kelly featuring Ronald Isley)	1995	4	1	R. Kelly
"Come with Me" (Keith Sweat featuring Ronald Isley)	1996	68	27	Keith Sweat
"Smokin' Me Out" (Warren G featuring Ronald Isley)	1997	35	20	Take a Look Over Your Shoulder
"Friend of Mine" (Kelly Price featuring Ronald Isley and R. Kelly)	1998	12	1	Soul of a Woman
"Bigger Business" (Swizz Beatz featuring Jadakiss, Ronald Isley, Diddy, Birdman, Snoop Dogg, Cassidy and TQ)	2002	—	72	Swizz Beatz Presents G.H.E.T.T.O. Stories
"Gotta Go Solo" (Patti LaBelle featuring Ronald Isley)	2004	89	31	Non-album singles
"Sweet Yamz (Remix)" (Fetty Wap featuring Charlie Wilson and Ronald Isley)	2022	—	—	Non-album singles
"The ATL Experience" (2 Chainz with Ronald Isley and The Isley Brothers)	2025	—	—	Red Clay
"—" denotes a recording that did not chart or was not released in that territory.

== Other charted songs ==
List of singles as featured artist, with selected chart positions and certifications, showing year released and album name
Title	Year	Peak chart positions		Album
Title	Year	US	US R&B	Album
"How Much a Dollar Cost" (Kendrick Lamar featuring James Fauntleroy and Ronald Isley)	2015	109	40	To Pimp a Butterfly

== Guest appearances ==
List of non-single guest appearances, with other performing artists, showing year released and album name
Title	Year	Other performer(s)	Album
"Hello Beloved"	1987	Angela Winbush	Sharp
"Lay Your Troubles Down"	1989	Angela Winbush	The Real Thing
"This Old Heart of Mine"	1990	Rod Stewart	This Old Heart of Mine
"Baby Hold On"	1994	Angela Winbush	Angela Winbush
"I'm Gon Blow Up"	1997	Queen Pen	My Melody
"Daddy's Little Baby"	1999	Ja Rule	Venni Vetti Vecci
"Project Windows"	1999	Nas	Nastradamus
"Heaven's Girl"	1999	Quincy Jones, R. Kelly, Aaron Hall, Charlie Wilson and Naomi Campbell	Q's Jook Joint
"Back in the Game"	2001	Wu-Tang Clan	Iron Flag
"There I Go Again / So Long"	2001	Mobb Deep	Infamy
"The Letter"	2001	Foxy Brown	Broken Silence
"Better Dayz"	2002	2Pac	Better Dayz
"Big Business"	2002	Jadakiss	Biker Boyz
"Handle Your Business"	2003	JS	Ice Cream
"Pimp Juice" (Jason "Jay E" Epperson Remix)	2003	Nelly	Da Derrty Versions: The Reinvention
"Showdown"	2003	R. Kelly	Chocolate Factory
"She Don't Know My Name"	2004	Nelly, Snoop Dogg	Suit and SweatSuit
"I Cry"	2004	Trick Daddy	Thug Matrimony: Married to the Streets
"Po Nigga Blues" (Scott Storch Remix)	2004	2Pac	Loyal to the Game
"Down Low (Nobody Has to Know)" (Live to Regret It/Blame It on the Mo Mix)	2005	R. Kelly	Remix City, Volume 1
"The Pimp & the Bun"	2009	UGK	UGK 4 Life
"Mi Corazon"	2010	MoNa a.k.a. Sad Girl	Where's My Key - EP
"Jesus"	2013	KEM, Patti LaBelle	What Christmas Means (Deluxe Edition)
"How Much a Dollar Cost?"	2015	Kendrick Lamar, James Fauntleroy	To Pimp a Butterfly
"Love Makes the World Go Round"	2016	Santana	Santana IV
"Freedom in Your Mind"	2016	Santana	Santana IV
"If I Should Die Tonight"	2021	Swizz Beatz	Godfather of Harlem: Season 2 (Original Series Soundtrack)
"Nobody Has To Know"	2026	Ty Dolla Sign	Girl Music Vol. 1
"Addictive"	2026	French Montana, Max B	Wave Gods 2: Cosmos Brothers
