= Billboard Hot R&B Hits: 1987 =

Compilation album by various artists
- Released: November 21, 1995
- Recorded: 1987
- Genres: Rhythm and blues, pop
- Length: 43:01
- Label: Rhino Records

Billboard Hot R&B Hits chronology
| Billboard Hot R&B Hits: 1986 (1995) | Billboard Hot R&B Hits: 1987 (1995) | Billboard Hot R&B Hits: 1988 (1995) |

Billboard Hot R&B Hits: 1987 is a compilation album released by Rhino Records in 1995, featuring 10 hit rhythm and blues recordings from 1987.

All tracks on the album were hits on Billboard's Hot Black Singles chart. In addition, several of the songs were mainstream hits, charting on the Billboard Hot 100 during 1987. Two of those mainstream hits — "Lean on Me" by Club Nouveau and "Head to Toe" by Lisa Lisa and Cult Jam — reached No. 1 on the Hot 100.

== Track listing ==
1. "Looking for a New Love" — Jody Watley 4:01
2. "Lean on Me" — Club Nouveau 4:00
3. "I Want to Be Your Man" — Roger 4:06
4. "Casanova" — LeVert 4:24
5. "I Feel Good All Over" — Stephanie Mills 4:17
6. "Love is a House" — Force M.D.'s 4:20
7. "Head to Toe" — Lisa Lisa and Cult Jam 4:05
8. "Have You Ever Loved Somebody" — Freddie Jackson 4:20
9. "Angel" — Angela Winbush 5:01
10. "Candy" — Cameo 4:27
