= Billboard Hot R&B Hits: 1988 =

Compilation album by various artists
- Released: November 21, 1995
- Recorded: 1988
- Genre: Rhythm and blues, pop
- Length: 43:09
- Label: Rhino Records

Billboard Hot R&B Hits chronology
Billboard Hot R&B Hits: 1987 (1995)	Billboard Hot R&B Hits: 1988 (1995)	Billboard Hot R&B Hits: 1989 (1995)

Billboard Hot R&B Hits: 1988 is a compilation album released by Rhino Records in 1995, featuring 10 hit rhythm and blues recordings from 1988.

All tracks on the album were hits on Billboard's Hot Black Singles chart. In addition, several of the songs were mainstream hits, charting on the Billboard Hot 100 during 1988 and early 1989. One of those mainstream hits — "My Prerogative" by Bobby Brown — reached No. 1 on the Hot 100.

== Track listing ==
Source: AllMusic.

1. "Just Got Paid" — Johnny Kemp 3:34
2. "Tumblin' Down" — Ziggy Marley & The Melody Makers 4:08
3. "My Prerogative" — Bobby Brown 4:38
4. "Little Walter" — Tony! Toni! Toné! 4:42
5. "Nite and Day" — Al B. Sure! 3:46
6. "Addicted to You" — LeVert 4:44
7. "Dial My Heart" — The Boys 4:26
8. "Joy" — Teddy Pendergrass 4:34
9. "Girlfriend" — Pebbles 4:20
10. "Nice 'N' Slow" — Freddie Jackson 4:17
