= Soul Train Music Award for Best R&B/Soul Single – Female =

Annual US music award

This page lists the winners and nominees for the Soul Train Music Award for Best R&B/Soul Single – Female. The award was given out every year since the first annual Soul Train Music Awards in 1987. From 1989-1992 the award was known as R&B/Urban Contemporary Single – Female. When the Soul Train Music Awards returned in 2009 the categories of Best R&B/Soul Single – Female and Best R&B/Soul Album – Female were consolidated into the Best R&B/Soul Female Artist category. Anita Baker has won the most awards in this category, with a total of three wins.

== Winners and nominees ==
Winners are listed first and highlighted in bold.

=== 1980s ===
Year	Artist	Single	Ref
1987
1987	**Anita Baker**	**"Sweet Love"**	
1987	Whitney Houston	"The Greatest Love of All"	
1987	Janet Jackson	"What Have You Done for Me Lately"	
1987	Meli'sa Morgan	"Do Me Baby"	
1988
1988	**Natalie Cole**	**"I Live for Your Love"**	
1988	Janet Jackson	"The Pleasure Principle"	
1988	Jody Watley	"Looking for a New Love"	
1988	Angela Winbush	"Angel"	
1989
1989	**Anita Baker**	**"Giving You the Best That I Got"**	
1989	Whitney Houston	"Where Do Broken Hearts Go"	
1989	Karyn White	"Superwoman"	
1989	Vanessa Williams	"The Right Stuff"	

=== 1990s ===
Year	Artist	Single	Ref
1990
1990	**Janet Jackson**	**"Miss You Much"**	
1990	Regina Belle	"Baby Come to Me"	
1990	Vesta	"Congratulations"	
1990	Karyn White	"Secret Rendezvous"	
1991
1991	**Mariah Carey**	**"Vision of Love"**	
1991	Anita Baker	"Talk to Me"	
1991	Janet Jackson	"Alright"	
1991	Lisa Stansfield	"All Around the World"	
1992
1992	**Lisa Fischer**	**"How Can I Ease the Pain"**	
1992	Natalie Cole	"Unforgettable"	
1992	Whitney Houston	"All the Man That I Need"	
1992	Patti LaBelle	"Feels Like Another One"	
1993
1993	**Whitney Houston**	**"I Will Always Love You"**	
1993	Mary J. Blige	"Real Love"	
1993	Toni Braxton	"Love Shoulda Brought You Home"	
1993	Vanessa Williams	"Save the Best For Last"	
1994
1994	**Toni Braxton**	**"Breathe Again"**	
1994	Oleta Adams	"I Just Had to Hear Your Voice"	
1994	Whitney Houston	"I Have Nothing	
1994	Janet Jackson	"That's the Way Love Goes"	
1995
1995	**Anita Baker**	**"Body & Soul"**	
1995	Brandy	"I Wanna Be Down"	
1995	Toni Braxton	"You Mean the World to Me"	
1995	Janet Jackson	"Any Time, Any Place"	
1996
1996	**Whitney Houston**	**"Exhale (Shoop Shoop)"**	
1996	Mary J. Blige	"I'm Going Down"	
1996	Brandy	"Brokenhearted"	
1996	Monica	"Like This and Like That" / "Before You Walk Out of My Life"	
1997
1997	**Toni Braxton**	**"You're Makin' Me High" / "Let It Flow"**	
1997	Mary J. Blige	"Not Gon' Cry"	
1997	Brandy	"Sittin' Up in My Room"	
1997	Monica	"Why I Love You So Much"	
1998
1998	**Erykah Badu**	**"On and On"**	
1998	Aaliyah	"One in a Million"	
1998	Mary J. Blige	"Everything"	
1998	Monica	"For You I Will"	
1999
1999	**Deborah Cox**	**"Nobody's Supposed to Be Here"**	
1999	Lauryn Hill	"Doo Wop (That Thing)"	
1999	Janet Jackson (featuring Blackstreet)	"I Get Lonely"	
1999	Kelly Price	"Friend of Mine"	

=== 2000s ===
Year	Artist	Single	Ref
2000
2000	**Lauryn Hill**	**"Ex-Factor"**	
2000	Mariah Carey (featuring Jay Z)	"Heartbreaker"	
2000	Whitney Houston	"My Love Is Your Love"	
2000	Chanté Moore	"Chanté's Got a Man"	
2001
2001	**Yolanda Adams**	**"Open My Heart"**	
2001	Erykah Badu	"Bag Lady"	
2001	Mary J. Blige	"Your Child"	
2001	Jill Scott	"Gettin' In the Way"	
2002
2002	**Aaliyah**	**"Rock the Boat"**	
2002	India.Arie	"Video"	
2002	Alicia Keys	"Fallin''"	
2002	Angie Stone	"Brotha"	
2003
2003	**Ashanti**	**"Foolish"**	
2003	Amerie	"Why Don't We Fall in Love"	
2003	Erykah Badu (featuring Common)	"Love of My Life (An Ode to Hip Hop)"	
2003	India.Arie	"Little Things"	
2004
2004	**Alicia Keys**	**"You Don't Know My Name"**	
2004	Ashanti	"Rain on Me"	
2004	Erykah Badu	"Danger"	
2004	Beyoncé (featuring Jay Z)	"Crazy in Love"	
2005
2005	**Alicia Keys**	**"If I Ain't Got You"**	
2005	Beyoncé	"Naughty Girl"	
2005	Ciara (featuring Petey Pablo)	"Goodies"	
2005	Jill Scott	"Golden"	
2006
2006	**Mariah Carey**	**"We Belong Together"**	
2006	Keyshia Cole	"I Should Have Cheated"	
2006	Alicia Keys	"Unbreakable"	
2006	Gwen Stefani	"Hollaback Girl"	
2007
2007	**Beyoncé**	**"Irreplaceable"**	
2007	Mary J. Blige	"Take Me As I Am"	
2007	Keyshia Cole	"Love"	
2007	LeToya	"Torn"	

== See also ==
- List of music awards honoring women
