= Billboard Hot R&B Hits: 1986 =

Compilation album by various artists
- Released: November 21, 1995
- Recorded: 1986
- Genres: Rhythm and blues, pop
- Length: 42:55
- Label: Rhino Records

Billboard Hot R&B Hits chronology
Billboard Hot R&B Hits: 1985 (1995)	Billboard Hot R&B Hits: 1986 (1995)	Billboard Hot R&B Hits: 1987 (1995)

Billboard Hot R&B Hits: 1986 is a compilation album released by Rhino Records in 1995, featuring 10 hit rhythm and blues recordings from 1986.

All tracks on the album were hits on Billboard's Hot Black Singles chart. In addition, several of the songs were mainstream hits, charting on the Billboard Hot 100 during 1986 and early 1987. Two of those mainstream hits — "There'll Be Sad Songs (To Make You Cry)" by Billy Ocean and "Shake You Down" by Gregory Abbott — reached number one on the Hot 100.

== Track listing ==
1. "Rumors" — Timex Social Club 4:49
2. "There'll Be Sad Songs (To Make You Cry)" — Billy Ocean 4:16
3. "Tasty Love" — Freddie Jackson 4:22
4. "Shake You Down" — Gregory Abbott 4:09
5. "Who's Johnny (Short Circuit Theme)" — El DeBarge 4:12
6. "Love You Down" — Ready For The World 4:04
7. "Do Me Baby" — Meli'sa Morgan 4:05
8. "Your Smile" — Rene & Angela 4:05
9. "I Can't Wait" — Nu Shooz 3:44
10. "The Rain" — Oran "Juice" Jones 5:09
