= Just Coolin' =

Just Coolin' may refer to:

- "Just Coolin'" (song), a 1989 song collaboration between LeVert and Heavy D
- Just Coolin' (album), an album by LeVert
- Just Coolin', an album by Art Blakey and the Jazz Messengers
