= Billboard Hot R&B Hits: 1985 =

Compilation album by various artists
- Released: November 21, 1995
- Recorded: 1985
- Genres: Rhythm and blues, pop
- Length: 43:47
- Label: Rhino Records

Billboard Hot R&B Hits chronology
Billboard Hot R&B Hits: 1984 (1996)	Billboard Hot R&B Hits: 1985 (1995)	Billboard Hot R&B Hits: 1986 (1995)

Billboard Hot R&B Hits: 1985 is a compilation album released by Rhino Records in 1995, featuring 10 hit rhythm and blues recordings from 1985.

All tracks on the album were hits on Billboard's Hot Black Singles chart. In addition, several of the songs were mainstream hits, charting on the Billboard Hot 100 during 1985.

== Track listing ==
1. "Caravan of Love" — Jasper Isley 4:23
2. "Freeway of Love" — Aretha Franklin 5:53
3. "Rhythm of the Night" — DeBarge 3:56
4. "Cherish" — Kool & the Gang 4:03
5. "Rock Me Tonight (For Old Times Sake)" — Freddie Jackson 4:05
6. "Nightshift" — Commodores 4:25
7. "Save Your Love (For #1)" — Rene & Angela 4:21
8. "Who's Holding Donna Now?" — DeBarge 4:11
9. "Treat Her Like a Lady" — The Temptations 4:18
10. "Back in Stride" — Maze featuring Frankie Beverly 4:12
