= Angel (Angela Winbush song) =

Single by Angela Winbush

from the album Sharp
- Released: 1987
- Genre: Soul
- Length: 3:45
- Label: Polygram
- Songwriter(s): Angela Winbush
- Producer(s): Angela Winbush

Angela Winbush singles chronology
"Angel" (1987)	"Run to Me" (1987)

"Angel" is the debut solo single by American R&B singer Angela Winbush. The track was released in 1987 as the first single from her debut album, Sharp on Polygram Records. As half of the duo of René & Angela, Winbush had two number-one R&B hits with "Save Your Love (For #1)" and "Your Smile." After a decade, René Moore and Winbush went their separate ways. "Angel", her solo-debut, spent two weeks at the top of the US Billboard R&B chart. It was also named by Billboard the number nine most successful R&B single of 1987. Despite the success, "Angel" did not make the Billboard Hot 100.

The single was nominated for a 1988 Soul Train Music Award for Best R&B/Soul Single, Female. The song also helped Winbush get nominated for Female Album of the Year. A video for "Angel" was released as a download on iTunes in May 2007.

In 2009, Essence magazine included the song in their list of the "25 Best Slow Jams of All Time".

== Track listing ==
US, Vinyl 12" Single

No.	Title	Length
1.	"Angel" (7" Version)	4:54
2.	"Angel" (Album Version)	5:18
3.	"Angel" (Instrumental)	5:18

== Charts ==
Chart (1987)	Peak position
US Hot Black Singles (Billboard)	1

== Compilations ==
The song also appears on several compilation albums including:

- Billboard Hot R&B Hits 1987
- Soul Classics: Quiet Storm—The 80's
- Love Jones: Best of Funk Essentials, Vol. 2
- Blues & Soul, Vol. 10: 1986-1987
- 80's Urban Beats and Grooves
