= Treat U Rite =

1994 single by Angela Winbush

Single by Angela Winbush

from the album Angela Winbush
- Released: January 13, 1994
- Recorded: 1993
- Genre: R&B; soul; new jack swing
- Length: 5:45
- Label: Elektra
- Songwriter: Chuckii Booker
- Producer: Chuckii Booker

Angela Winbush singles chronology
"Please Bring Your Love Back" (1990)	"Treat U Rite" (1994)	"Inner City Blues" (1994)

"Treat U Rite" is a R&B/Soul song by American singer-songwriter Angela Winbush, released on January 13, 1994, by Elektra Records, as the first single from her third solo album, Angela Winbush (1994). The song was her first single in over four years, from her first album of new music in over five years. It was recorded and mixed at Aire LA Studios by Raymundo Silva.

The song entered the US Billboard R&B/Hip Hop Songs chart on February 26, 1994, where it spent twenty-two weeks on the chart, peaking at number six. It spent six weeks in the top ten of the chart. Winbush performed the song on an episode of Soul Train, which aired on May 14, 1994.

== Track listing and formats ==
- US 12" Vinyl single

A1 "Treat U Rite" (Extended Version) – 6:11
A2 "Treat U Rite" (Percapella) – 6:11
B1 "Treat U Rite" (Edit LP Version) – 4:10
B2 "Treat U Rite" (Instrumental) – 6:11
B3 "Dream Lover" (LP Version) – 6:02

- US CD single
1. "Treat U Rite" (Edit LP Version) – 4:10
2. "Treat U Rite" (Extended Version) – 6:11
3. "Treat U Rite" (Instrumental) – 6:11
4. "Treat U Rite" (Percapella) – 6:11

== Charts ==
=== Weekly charts ===
Chart (1994)	Peak position
US Bubbling Under Hot 100 (Billboard)	11
US Dance Singles Sales (Billboard)	44
US Hot R&B/Hip-Hop Songs (Billboard)	6

=== Year-end charts ===
Chart (1994)	Position
US Hot R&B/Hip-Hop Songs (Billboard)	43
