= Lay Your Troubles Down =

Single by Angela Winbush and Ronald Isley

from the album The Real Thing
- Released: May 14, 1990
- Genre: Soul
- Length: 4:33
- Label: Polygram
- Songwriter: Angela Winbush
- Producer: Angela Winbush

Angela Winbush singles chronology
"No More Tears" (1990)	"Lay Your Troubles Down" (1990)	"Please Bring Your Love Back" (1990)

"Lay Your Troubles Down" is the third single for Angela Winbush's second album, The Real Thing. "Lay Your Troubles Down" features Isley Brothers singer Ronald Isley, whom Winbush would later marry. The song became her fourth top 10 solo single (eight in total) summer 1990.

== Charts ==
Chart (1990)	Peak position
US Hot R&B/Hip-Hop Songs (Billboard)	10
