= 1989 Soul Train Music Awards =

Music awards ceremony in Los Angeles, US

Soul Train Music Awards
- Date: April 13, 1989
- Location: Shrine Auditorium, Los Angeles, California
- Country: United States
- Hosted by: Dionne Warwick, Patti LaBelle and Ahmad Rashad
- First award: 1987

Highlights
- Most awards: Michael Jackson (4)
- Website: soultrain.com

Television/radio coverage
- Network: WGN America

The 1989 Soul Train Music Awards was held at the Shrine Auditorium in Los Angeles, California and aired live in select cities on April 13, 1989 (and was later syndicated in other areas), honoring the best in R&B, soul, rap, jazz, and gospel music from the previous year. The show was hosted by Patti LaBelle, Ahmad Rashad and Dionne Warwick.

== Special awards ==
=== Heritage Award for Career Achievement ===
- Michael Jackson

=== Sammy Davis Jr. Award for Entertainer of the Year ===
- Michael Jackson

== Winners and nominees ==
Winners are in bold text.

=== Best R&B/Urban Contemporary Album of the Year – Male ===
- **Bobby Brown – Don't Be Cruel**
  - Bobby McFerrin – Simple Pleasures
  - Al B. Sure – In Effect Mode
  - Luther Vandross – Any Love

=== Best R&B/Urban Contemporary Album of the Year – Female ===
- **Anita Baker – Giving You the Best That I Got**
  - Tracy Chapman – Tracy Chapman
  - Sade – Stronger Than Pride
  - Vanessa Williams – The Right Stuff

=== Best R&B/Urban Contemporary Album of the Year – Group, Band, or Duo ===
- **New Edition – Heart Break**
  - Guy – Guy
  - LeVert – Just Coolin'
  - Tony! Toni! Toné! – Who?

=== Best R&B/Urban Contemporary Single – Male ===
- **Michael Jackson – "Man in the Mirror"**
  - Bobby Brown – "My Prerogative"
  - Johnny Kemp – "Just Got Paid"
  - Keith Sweat – "Make It Last Forever""

=== Best R&B/Urban Contemporary Single – Female ===
- **Anita Baker – "Giving You the Best That I Got"**
  - Whitney Houston – "Where Do Broken Hearts Go"
  - Karyn White – "Superwoman"
  - Vanessa Williams – "The Right Stuff"
- Note: This segment of the awards ceremony is most memorable because when Whitney Houston's name was called, the crowd began to boo her, citing the idea that Houston was "acting white" and was a "sell-out".

=== Best R&B/Urban Contemporary Single – Group Band or Duo ===
- **E.U. – "Da Butt"**
  - Rob Base and DJ E-Z Rock – "It Takes Two"
  - Guy – "Groove Me"
  - New Edition – "If It Isn't Love"

=== Best R&B/Urban Contemporary Song of the Year ===
- **Anita Baker – "Giving You the Best That I Got"**
  - Bobby Brown – "My Prerogative"
  - Michael Jackson – "Man in the Mirror"
  - Keith Sweat – "I Want Her"

=== Best R&B/Urban Contemporary Music Video ===
- **Michael Jackson – "Man in the Mirror"**
  - DJ Jazzy Jeff & the Fresh Prince – "Parents Just Don't Understand"
  - Kool Moe Dee – "Wild Wild West"
  - Stevie Wonder – "Skeletons"

=== Best R&B/Urban Contemporary New Artist ===
- **Al B. Sure!**
  - Guy
  - Karyn White
  - BeBe & CeCe Winans

=== Best Rap Album ===
- **DJ Jazzy Jeff and the Fresh Prince – He's the DJ, I'm the Rapper**
  - Rob Base and DJ E-Z Rock – It Takes Two
  - Public Enemy – It Takes a Nation of Millions to Hold Us Back
  - Salt-N-Pepa – A Salt with a Deadly Pepa

=== Best Gospel Album ===
- **Take 6 – Take 6**
  - Shirley Caesar – Live in Chicago
  - The Clark Sisters – Conqueror
  - James Cleveland – Inspired

=== Best Jazz Album ===
- **Kenny G – Silhouette**
  - Bobby McFerrin – Simple Pleasures
  - Najee – Day by Day
  - Sade – Stronger Than Pride

== Performances ==
- Ashford & Simpson – "I'll Be There for You"
- Sheena Easton – "The Lover in Me"
- Sinbad and Paul Rodriguez
- Levert and Heavy D & The Boyz – "Just Coolin'"
- Bobby Brown – "My Prerogative"
- Michael Jackson Tibute:
  - Patti LaBelle – "I Just Can't Stop Loving You"
  - Dionne Warwick – "Man in the Mirror"
- New Edition and Rob Base – "Crucial"
- Shirley Caesar, The Clark Sisters, Thelma Houston, BeBe & CeCe Winans and The Winans – "Lean on Me"

== Presenters ==
- Jasmine Guy and Keith Sweat - Presented Best R&B Urban Contemporary New Artist
- Louis Gossett Jr. and Stephanie Mills - Presented Best Gospel Album
- Run DMC and Johnny Kemp - Presented Best R&B Urban Contemporary Album Group, Band, or Duo
- Don King and Mike Tyson - Presented Best R&B Urban Contemporary Album Male
- Lisa Lisa & Cult Jam and Al B. Sure! - Presented Best R&B Urban Contemporary Single Group, Band, or Duo
- Karyn White and Public Enemy - Presented Best Jazz Album
- Pebbles and Guy - Presented Best Rap Album
- James Ingram and Heather Locklear - Presented Best R&B Urban Contemporary Single Female
- Eddie Murphy and Elizabeth Taylor - Presented Sammy Davis Jr. For Enetrtainer of the Year
- LL Cool J., Cheryl Pepsii Riley, and Alyson Williams - Presented Best R&B Urban Contemporary Single Male
- Melissa Manchester and The Boys - Presented Best Urban Contemporary Song of the Year
- Quincy Jones and Anita Pointer - Presented Best Urban Contemporary Music Video
- Billy Dee Williams and Desiree Coleman - Presented R&B Urban Contemporary Album Female
