= Run to Me =

Run to Me may refer to:

- "Run to Me" (Bee Gees song), 1972
- "Run to Me" (Smokie song), 1980
- "Run to Me" (Angela Winbush song), 1987
- "Run to Me", a 1986 song by Tracy Spencer
- "Run to Me", a 1994 song by Double You
- "Run to Me", a 2019 song by Brittany Howard from the album Jaime
- Run to Me, the alternative name for the 2016 television movie Running for Her Life, starring Claire Forlani
- Run To Me (miniseries), a 2022 Philippine online miniseries
