= Your Smile =

Your Smile may refer to:

- Your Smile (song), a 1986 song by René & Angela
- Your Smile (film), a 1934 French comedy film
