= C'est Toi (It's You) =

Single by Angela Winbush

from the album Sharp
- Released: 1988
- Genre: Soul
- Length: 7:25
- Label: Polygram
- Songwriter(s): Angela Winbush
- Producer(s): Angela Winbush

Angela Winbush singles chronology
"Run to Me" (1987)	"C'est Toi (It's You)" (1988)	"Hello Beloved" (1988)

"C'est Toi (It's You)" was the third single from Angela Winbush's solo debut, Sharp. "C'est Toi (It's You)" peaked at number 47. It was her first single to miss the top forty, including her duo work as Rene & Angela.

A video for "C'est Toi (It's You)" was released as a download on iTunes in May 2007.

== Charts ==
Chart (1988)	Peak position
U.S. Billboard Hot Black Singles	47
