= It's the Real Thing =

"It's The Real Thing"

Single by Angela Winbush

from the album The Real Thing
- Released: September 11, 1989
- Recorded: 1988–1989
- Genre: Soul; new jack swing; R&B; pop; dance
- Length: 4:46
- Label: Polygram
- Songwriter(s): Angela Winbush
- Producer(s): Angela Winbush

Angela Winbush singles chronology
"Hello Beloved" (1988)	"It's The Real Thing" (1989)	"No More Tears" (1990)

"It's the Real Thing" is a 1989 song by American R&B singer Angela Winbush. It is the lead single from her second studio album, The Real Thing. The track was an R&B hit which peaked to number two on the R&B Singles chart. Actor Don Cheadle appears in the music video for the song.

== Track listing ==
US, Vinyl 12" Single

No.	Title	Length
1.	"It's The Real Thing" (Extended Version)	7:37
2.	"It's The Real Thing" (Extended Instrumental)	7:37
3.	"It's The Real Thing" (Dub)	4:51

== Charts ==
=== Weekly charts ===
Chart (1989)	Peak position
US Hot R&B/Hip-Hop Songs (Billboard)	2

=== Year-end charts ===
Chart (1990)	Position
US Hot R&B/Hip-Hop Songs (Billboard)	61
