= Street Called Desire =

Studio album by René & Angela
- Released: June 13, 1985
- Recorded: December 1984–May 1985
- Studios: René & Angela's Studios; Ocean Way Recording in Hollywood, CA, US; Image Recorders in Hollywood, CA; Greene St. Recording in New York City, NY; Evergreen Recording in Burbank, California; A&R Studios in New York City, NY
- Genres: Funk, soul, R&B
- Label: Mercury
- Producers: René & Angela, Bobby Watson, Bruce Swedien

René & Angela chronology
Rise (1983)	Street Called Desire (1985)

Professional ratings
Review scores
Source	Rating
AllMusic	5/5 stars

Street Called Desire is the fourth and final album by American singing duo René & Angela. This would be their only album released on the Mercury label. The album includes the number-one R&B hits "Save Your Love (For #1)" and "Your Smile", and the two top-5 R&B hits "I'll Be Good" and "You Don't Have to Cry".

== Track listing ==
Written by Rene & Angela.

1. "Save Your Love (For #1)" – 4:20
2. "I'll Be Good" – 5:14
3. "No How – No Way" – 5:00
4. "You Don't Have to Cry" – 5:53
5. "Street Called Desire" – 4:40
6. "Your Smile" – 4:26
7. "Who's Foolin' Who" – 5:06
8. "Drive My Love" – 4:09

== Personnel ==
- Angela Winbush – Lead & Backing Vocals, Keyboards
- René Moore – Keyboards, Synthesizer (Synth Bass), Lead & Backing Vocals
- Kurtis Blow – Rap
- Jeff Lorber, Ramsey Embick – Keyboards
- Donald Griffin, Michael McGloiry, Paul Jackson, Jr., Paul Pesco, Tony Maiden – Guitars
- Bobby Watson – Bass
- Andre Fischer, John Robinson, Leon "Ndugu" Chancler, Rayford Griffin – Drums
- Paulinho Da Costa – Percussion
- Ambrose Price, Derwin Suttle – Handclaps

== Charts ==
=== Weekly charts ===
Chart (1985)	Peak position
US Billboard 200	64
US Top R&B/Hip-Hop Albums (Billboard)	5

=== Year-end charts ===
Chart (1985)	Position
US Top R&B/Hip-Hop Albums (Billboard)	38
Chart (1986)	Position
US Billboard 200	47
US Top R&B/Hip-Hop Albums (Billboard)	4

=== Singles ===
Year	Single	Chart Positions			
Year	Single	US	US R&B	US Dance	UK
1985	"Save Your Love (For #1)"	101	1	3	66
1985	"I'll Be Good"	47	4	7	22
1985	"Secret Rendezvous"	—	—	—	54
1985	"Your Smile"	62	1	47	—
1986	"You Don't Have to Cry"	75	2	—	—
1986	"No How – No Way"	—	29	—	—
