= Billboard Hot R&B Hits: 1989 =

Compilation album by various artists
- Released: November 21, 1995
- Recorded: 1989
- Genres: Rhythm and blues, pop
- Length: 42:13
- Label: Rhino Records

Billboard Hot R&B Hits chronology
| Billboard Hot R&B Hits: 1988 (1995) | Billboard Hot R&B Hits: 1989 (1995) |

Billboard Hot R&B Hits: 1989 is a compilation album released by Rhino Records in 1995, featuring 10 hit rhythm and blues recordings from 1989.

All tracks on the album were #1 hits on Billboard's Hot Black Singles chart. In addition, several of the songs were mainstream hits, charting on the Billboard Hot 100 during 1989.

== Track listing ==
1. "Keep on Movin'" — Soul II Soul 3:37
2. "Me, Myself and I" — De La Soul 3:43
3. "Real Love" — Jody Watley 4:24
4. "All of My Love" — The Gap Band 4:51
5. "Baby Come to Me" — Regina Belle 4:15
6. "Shower Me with Your Love" — Surface 4:54
7. "Start of a Romance" — Skyy 3:47
8. "Ain't Nuthin' in the World" — Miki Howard 4:16
9. "Can't Get Over You" — Maze featuring Frankie Beverly 4:43
10. "Remember (The First Time)" — Eric Gable 3:43
