= Baby I'm Ready =

Single by LeVert

from the album Rope a Dope Style
- B-side: "Now You Know"
- Released: May 13, 1991
- Recorded: 1990
- Genre: R&B
- Length: 5:21
- Label: Atlantic
- Songwriter(s): Gerald Levert and Marc Gordon

LeVert singles chronology
"All Season" (1991)	"Baby I'm Ready" (1991)	"Give a Little Love" (1991)

"Baby I'm Ready" is the title of a number-one R&B single by LeVert. The song spent one week at number one on the US R&B chart in July 1991 and is the group's final number one on the chart.

== See also ==
- List of number-one R&B singles of 1991 (U.S.)
