= No More Tears (Angela Winbush song) =

Single by Angela Winbush

from the album The Real Thing
- Released: February 12, 1990
- Genre: Soul
- Length: 4:00
- Label: Polygram
- Songwriter(s): Angela Winbush
- Producer(s): Angela Winbush

Angela Winbush singles chronology
"It's the Real Thing" (1989)	"No More Tears" (1990)	"Lay Your Troubles Down" (1990)

"No More Tears" is a ballad song by American R&B/soul singer Angela Winbush, released as the second single from Winbush's second album, The Real Thing. "No More Tears" reached the Top ten of the airplay chart, and reached number twelve on the Billboard U.S. R&B Singles chart.

== Charts ==
Chart (1990)	Peak position
U.S. Billboard Hot Black Singles	12
