= ABC-123 =

Single by LeVert

from the album For Real Tho'
- Released: May 13, 1993
- Genre: R&B
- Length: 5:54 (album version); 4:15 (single edit)
- Label: Atlantic
- Songwriters: Gerald Levert; Edwin Nicholas; Terry Scott
- Producers: Gerald Levert; Edwin Nicholas

LeVert singles chronology
"Good Ol' Days" (1993)	"ABC-123" (1993)	"Do the Thangs" (1993)

"ABC-123" is a song performed by American contemporary R&B group LeVert. The song is the closing track on their sixth studio album, For Real Tho' (1993), and was issued in May 1993 by Atlantic Records, as the album's second single. Co-written and co-produced by lead singer Gerald Levert, it was the last song from the group to chart on the US Billboard Hot 100 and Cash Box Top 100 charts, peaking at numbers 46 and 43.

== Charts ==
Chart (1993)	Peak position
US Billboard Hot 100	46
US Hot R&B/Hip-Hop Singles & Tracks (Billboard)	5
US Rhythmic Top 40 (Billboard)	32
US Cash Box Top 100	43
