= Wall to Wall (album) =

Studio album by René & Angela
- Released: August 10, 1981
- Recorded: July 2–30, 1981
- Studios: Kendun Recorders, Burbank, California
- Genres: Soul, R&B
- Label: Capitol
- Producers: Bobby Watson, René & Angela

René & Angela chronology
René & Angela (1980)	Wall to Wall (1981)	Rise (1983)

Professional ratings
Review scores
Source	Rating
AllMusic	4/5 stars

Wall to Wall is the second album by American singing duo René & Angela, released on August 10, 1981 by Capitol Records.

== Track listing ==
All tracks composed by René Moore and Angela Winbush; except where indicated

1. "Wall to Wall" – 5:23
2. "Good Friends" – 3:23
3. "Secret Rendezvous" – 4:10
4. "Wanna Be Close to You" – 6:02
5. "I Love You More" – 5:30
6. "Love's Alright" – 3:40
7. "Imaginary Playmates" – (René Moore, Angela Winbush, Chainey) 4:30
8. "Come My Way" – 4:46

== Personnel ==
- Angela Winbush – Lead & Backing Vocal, Keyboards, Synthesizers
- René Moore – Synthesizer, Bass (Synthesizer), Lead & Backing Vocals
- David Wolinski, Ian Underwood – Keyboards
- Gregory Moore, Michael McGloiry, Tony Maiden – Guitars
- Louis Johnson, Bobby Watson, James Jamerson – Bass
- Andre Fischer, Jeff Porcaro, John Robinson, Ollie Brown – Drums
- Bill Reichenbach, Chuck Findley, Jerry Hey, Larry Williams – Horns

== Charts ==
Chart (1981)	Peak position
U.S. Billboard Top LPs	100
U.S. Billboard Top Soul LPs	15
