= Sharp (Angela Winbush album) =

Studio album by Angela Winbush
- Released: September 1987
- Recorded: 1986–1987
- Studios: Oceanway & Westlake Studios
- Genres: R&B; soul
- Length: 45:40
- Label: Mercury
- Producer: Angela Winbush

Angela Winbush chronology
Sharp (1987)	The Real Thing (1989)

Singles from Sharp
- 1. "Angel" Released: August 1987; 2. "Run to Me" Released: November 1987; 3. "C'est Toi (It's You)" Released: April 1988; 4. "Hello Beloved" Released: July 1988

Professional ratings
Review scores
Source	Rating
AllMusic	4/5 stars

Sharp is the debut studio album by the American musician Angela Winbush, after she left the duo Rene & Angela. The album was released in 1987 on Mercury Records and peaked at No. 7 on the Billboard R&B Albums chart and at No. 81 on the Billboard 200.

The album spawned four singles which were all commercially successful on the US R&B singles chart, including the album's lead single "Angel" which peaked at No. 1 on Billboard's Hot R&B Songs.

On the vinyl pressing, tracks 1–5 were known as the "Slammin' Side", while tracks 6–9 were known as the "Quiet Storm Side". The album, as well as the single "Angel", were nominated for a Soul Train Music Award in 1988.

== Track listing ==
All songs written, arranged, produced and performed by Angela Winbush, except where noted.

No.	Title	Length
1.	"Sharp"	4:20
2.	"Sensual Lover"	4:44
3.	"Run to Me"	4:47
4.	"Imagination of the Heart"	4:43
5.	"C'est Toi (It's You)"	4:20
6.	"Angel"	5:18
7.	"Hello Beloved" (Duet with Ronald Isley)	5:45
8.	"You Had a Good Girl"	5:41
9.	"No One Has Ever Cared (Like You)"	6:30

== Personnel ==
- Angela Winbush - Lead & Backing Vocals, Keyboards, Synthesizers, Drum Programming, Electric & Synthesized Bass, Percussion
- Paul Jackson, Jr., Wah-Wah Watson, Tony Maiden - Guitars
- Louis Johnson, Nathan East - Bass
- Rayford Griffin - Drums
- Paulinho Da Costa - Percussion

== Production ==
- Executive Producer: Ronald Isley
- Produced By Angela Winbush
- Engineered By Steve Sykes
- Mixed By Angela Winbush & Steve Sykes
- Mastered By Brian Gardner
- All Songs Published By Angel Notes Music

== Charts ==
Chart (1987)	Peak position
US Billboard 200	81
US Top R&B/Hip-Hop Albums (Billboard)	7

=== Singles ===
Year	Single	Chart positions	
Year	Single	US R&B	US Dance
1987	"Angel"	1	—
1987	"Run to Me"	4	32
1988	"C'est Toi (It's You)"	47	—
1988	"Hello Beloved"	26	—
