= Billboard Hot R&B Hits: 1984 =

Compilation album by various artists
- Released: February 27, 1996
- Recorded: 1984
- Genre: Rhythm and blues, pop
- Length: 41:11
- Label: Rhino Records

Billboard Hot R&B Hits chronology
Billboard Hot R&B Hits: 1983 (1996)	Billboard Hot R&B Hits: 1984 (1996)	Billboard Hot R&B Hits: 1985 (1995)

Professional ratings
Review scores
Source	Rating
AllMusic	4.5/5 stars

Billboard Hot R&B Hits: 1984 is a compilation album released by Rhino Records in 1995, featuring 10 hit rhythm and blues recordings from 1984.

All tracks on the album were hits on Billboard's Hot Black Singles chart. In addition, several of the songs were mainstream hits, charting on the Billboard Hot 100 during 1984 and early 1985.

== Track listing ==
No.	Title	Writer(s)	Artist	Length
1.	"Solid"	Nickolas Ashford; Valerie Simpson	Ashford & Simpson	3:46
2.	"Let the Music Play"	Chris Barbosa; Ed Chisolm	Shannon	4:39
3.	"Joanna"	Robert Earl Bell; Ronald Nathan Bell; James Bonneford; George Melvin Brown; James "J.T." Taylor; Claydes Charles Smith; Clifford Adams; Curtis "Fitz" Williams	Kool & the Gang	4:02
4.	"She's Strange"	Larry Blackmon; Tomi Jenkins; Nathan Leftenant; Charlie Singleton	Cameo	3:49
5.	"I Feel for You"	Prince Rogers Nelson	Chaka Khan	4:09
6.	"Don't Waste Your Time"	Jonah Ellis	Yarbrough & Peoples	4:09
7.	"If Only You Knew"	Cynthia Biggs; Dexter Wansel; Kenneth Gamble	Patti LaBelle	3:51
8.	"Automatic"	Brock Walsh; Mark Goldenberg	Pointer Sisters	4:50
9.	"You, Me and He"	James Mtume	Mtume	4:17
10.	"Encore"	Jimmy Jam; Terry Lewis	Cheryl Lynn	3:39
Total length:				41:11

- Track information and credits taken from the album's liner notes.
