= Angela Winbush (album) =

Studio album by Angela Winbush
- Released: March 15, 1994
- Recorded: 1993–1994
- Length: 61:57
- Label: Elektra
- Producers: Chuckii Booker; Sekou Bunch; Ronald Isley; Ernie Isley; Roman Johnson; Angela Winbush

Angela Winbush chronology
The Real Thing (1989)	Angela Winbush (1994)

Singles from Angela Winbush
- 1. "Treat U Rite" Released: February 1994; 2. "Inner City Blues" Released: May 1994

Angela Winbush is the third studio album by American singer-songwriter Angela Winbush, released on March 15, 1994, on Elektra Records. The self-titled album reached No. 11 on Billboard's Top R&B Albums chart.

== Background ==
The album features two versions of the Marvin Gaye classic "Inner City Blues"; the album version and a radio edit.

"Inner City Blues" and the lead single "Treat U Rite" were produced by singer-songwriter Chuckii Booker. Also included on the album is "Baby Hold On", a duet with then-husband Ronald Isley.

== Singles ==
"Treat U Rite" quickly gained heavy rotation on US R&B radio airplay. The song became an R&B hit, and peaked at No. 6 on the Billboard Top R&B Songs chart.

== Critical reception ==
Professional ratings
Review scores
Source	Rating
AllMusic	3/5 stars
Los Angeles Times	3/4 stars

AllMusic's Andrew Hamilton rated the album three out of five stars. Hamilton remarked "Angela Winbush has seductive, entrancing tracks like "Treat U Rite," "Keep Turning Me On," and "Hot Summer Love." A singer's singer, Winbush's intense, sinewy vocalizing can turn the most mundane arrangement into the sweetest ear candy. The only disappointment is her ballyhooed remake of Marvin Gaye's "Inner City Blues (Make Me Wanna Holler)."

Andy Gill of The Independent praised the album saying "Angela Winbush also arranges, produces and plays on most of her own songs, and her apprenticeship with Stevie Wonder has clearly prepared her well. The list of session men on her first album for Elektra - the likes of George Duke, Nathan East, Gerald Albright and Ernie Isley, alongside her hubby Ronald Isley - suggests that Angela's been shopping on Elektra's account, and shopping wisely: taut but intimate, this is the kind of classy 'Quiet Storm' product that should finally see her elevated to the same level as the Whitneys and Anitas.

Connie Johnson of the Los Angeles Times gave the album a 3 out of 4 stars rating. Johnson commented "On her first album in four years, Winbush mostly takes it easy. Given the hot-blooded love ballads she's written in the past, a big let down is her duet with her husband "Ronald Isley" on the routine, "Baby Hold On". Winbush really bounces back on "Treat You Right" and "Hot Summer Love", both of which feature her signature sassiness."

== Track listing ==
All tracks written by Angela Winbush, except where noted.

No.	Title	Writer(s)	Length
1.	"Treat U Rite"	Chuckii Booker	6:11
2.	"Inner City Blues"	Marvin Gaye; James Nyx Jr.	5:54
3.	"Keep Turnin' Me On"		6:29
4.	"Too Good to Let You Go"		5:45
5.	"Baby Hold On" (Duet with Ronald Isley)		5:22
6.	"You're My Everything"		5:39
7.	"Dream Lover"		6:02
8.	"Hot Summer Love"		4:47
9.	"Sensitive Heart"	Angela Winbush; Ronald Isley; Ernie Isley; Marvin Isley	5:04
10.	"I'm the Kind of Woman"		5:47
11.	"Inner City Blues"	Marvin Gaye; James Nyx Jr.	5:34

== Personnel ==
- Angela Winbush – lead & backing vocals, keyboards, synthesizers, piano, programming, clavinet, synthesized bass, drums, percussion, drum programming
- Gerald Albright – alto saxophone
- Chuckii Booker – keyboards, synthesizers, electric bass, acoustic and electric guitars, drums, percussion, drum programming
- Sekou Bunch – electric bass, drums, percussion
- George Duke – flute, piano
- Nathan East – bass
- Ernie Isley – acoustic & electric six- and twelve-string guitars, sitar, 12-string bass
- Roman Johnson – keyboards, synthesizers, sampling, synthesized bass, drums, percussion, synthesized horns
- Herman Matthews – drums, percussion
- Michael Schlesinger – keyboards, programmer

== Production ==
- Executive producers – Bob Krasnow & Ronald Isley
- Recorded & engineered by Conley Abrams, Mike Ross & Raymond Silva
- Assistant engineers – Mark Guilbeault, Kenji Nakai, Tim Nitz
- Mixing by Conley Abrams, Raymond Silva
- Mastered by Greg Calbi
- Producer – Angela Winbush (tracks 3–10)

Track & credits

== Charts ==
=== Weekly charts ===
Chart (1994)	Peak position
US Billboard 200	96
US Top R&B/Hip-Hop Albums (Billboard)	11

=== Year-end charts ===
Chart (1994)	Position
US Top R&B/Hip-Hop Albums (Billboard)	66

=== Singles ===
Year	Single	Chart positions		
Year	Single	US R&B	US Dance	UK
1994	"Treat U Rite"	6	43	—
1994	"Inner City Blues"	49	—	86
