= Rope a Dope Style =

Studio album by LeVert
- Released: November 6, 1990
- Genre: R&B
- Length: 49:47
- Label: Atlantic
- Producer: Gerald Levert; Marc Gordon

LeVert chronology
Just Coolin' (1988)	Rope a Dope Style (1990)	For Real Tho' (1993)

Singles from Rope a Dope Style
- 1. "Rope a Dope Style" Released: September 26, 1990; 2. "Give a Little Love" Released: 1991; 3. "All Season" Released: 1991; 4. "Baby I'm Ready" Released: 1991

Professional ratings
Review scores
Source	Rating
AllMusic	3/5 stars
The Rolling Stone Album Guide	2.5/5 stars

Rope a Dope Style is the fifth studio album by American contemporary R&B group LeVert, released November 6, 1990, via Atlantic Records. The album was produced by group members Gerald Levert and Marc Gordon; and it peaked at No. 122 on the Billboard 200.

Four singles were released from the album: the title track, "Give a Little Love", "All Season" and "Baby I'm Ready". The album was certified gold on July 22, 1991.

== Track listing ==
All tracks are written by Gerald Levert and Marc Gordon, except "Nobody Does It Better" written by Frederick Nathaniel White.

No.	Title	Length
1.	"Now You Know"	4:41
2.	"Rope a Dope Style"	5:06
3.	"Absolutely Positive"	4:56
4.	"All Season"	5:44
5.	"Rain"	4:54
6.	"Nobody Does It Better"	4:03
7.	"I've Been Waiting"	6:25
8.	"Baby I'm Ready"	5:21
9.	"Hey Girl"	4:40
10.	"Give a Little Love"	4:00
Total length:		49:47

== Chart positions ==
Chart (1990)	Peak position
US Billboard 200	122
US R&B Albums (Billboard)	9
