= I Get Hot =

Studio album by LeVert
- Released: May 1985
- Recorded: 1984
- Studios: Sigma Sound, New York City
- Genre: R&B
- Label: Tempre
- Producers: Eddie Levert; Gerald Levert; Dexter Wansel; Matt Rose; Harry Coombs; Walter Williams

LeVert chronology
I Get Hot (1985)	Bloodline (1986)

Singles from I Get Hot
- 1. "I'm Still" Released: 1985; 2. "All in the Way You Dance" Released: 1985; 3. "Dancing with You" Released: 1985

Professional ratings
Review scores
Source	Rating
AllMusic	2.5/5 stars

I Get Hot is the debut studio album from the American contemporary R&B group LeVert, released in 1985 via independent imprint Tempre Records. The album did not chart in the United States; however, the lead single, "I'm Still", peaked at No. 70 on the Billboard R&B chart.

== Track listing ==
No.	Title	Writer(s)	Length
1.	"I'm Still"	Eddie Levert, Gerald Levert	6:18
2.	"I Get Hot"	Cynthia Biggs, Dexter Wansel	4:31
3.	"I Want Too"	Marc Gordon	5:36
4.	"Exciting Lady"	Gerald Levert	4:47
5.	"All in the Way You Dance"	Gerald Levert	5:25
6.	"Dancing with You"	Gerald Levert	5:01
7.	"Melt"	Gerald Levert, Marc Gordon	5:15
8.	"Jam"	Gerald Levert, Marc Gordon	5:59

== Personnel ==
LeVert

- Gerald Levert – lead vocals, backing vocals
- Sean Levert – percussion, backing vocals
- Marc Gordon – keyboards, backing vocals

Additional musicians

- Billy Biddle – keyboards
- Randy Cantor – keyboards
- Matt Rose – keyboards
- Mick Rossi – keyboards
- Dexter Wansel – keyboards
- David Webster – keyboards
- Kae Williams Jr. – keyboards
- Robert Cunningham – guitars, backing vocals
- Russell Evans – guitars
- Norman Harris – guitars
- Willie Ross – guitars
- Quinton Rueben – guitars
- Mike Ferguson – bass, backing vocals
- Dwayne Simon – drums, backing vocals
- Perry Wilson – drums
- Donald Murphy – backing vocals

Production

- Harry J. Coombs – producer
- Eddie Levert – producer
- Gerald Levert – producer
- Dexter Wansel – producer
- Matt Rose – producer
- Walter Williams – producer
- Gene Leone – engineer
- Arthur Stoppe – engineer
- Mike Tarisa – engineer
- Barry Craig – assistant engineer
- Scott MacMinn – assistant engineer
- Glenn McKee – assistant engineer
- Chris Pukay – assistant engineer
- Billy Terrill – remixing (1, 5, 7, 8)
- Nimitr Sarikananda – mastering at Frankford/Wayne Mastering Labs (New York, NY)
- Ruben Benson – art direction
- Bob Alford – photography
