= The Real Thing (Angela Winbush album) =

Studio album by Angela Winbush
- Released: September 1989
- Genre: R&B
- Length: 48:12
- Label: Polygram
- Producers: Angela Winbush; Sekou Bunch; Ronald Isley; Ernie Isley

Angela Winbush chronology
Sharp (1987)	The Real Thing (1989)	Angela Winbush (1994)

Singles from The Real Thing
- 1. "It's The Real Thing" Released: September 1989; 2. "No More Tears" Released: February 1990; 3. "Lay Your Troubles Down" Released: May 1990; 4. "Please Bring Your Love Back" Released: October 1990

The Real Thing is the second studio album by American recording R&B singer-songwriter Angela Winbush released under Polygram Records in May 1989. It is the sophomore release after Winbush's debut album Sharp and features the R&B hit singles "It's The Real Thing", "Lay Your Troubles Down", and "No More Tears".

The album includes Winbush's cover of "I Have Learned to Respect the Power of Love", in which she wrote and produced for Stephanie Mills and appears on her 1985 self-titled album.

== Critical reception ==
Professional ratings
Review scores
Source	Rating
Allmusic	3/5 stars

Alex Henderson of Allmusic wrote, "For all its slickness and high-tech production gloss, this is an album with plenty of soul and grit."

== Track listing ==
All songs produced, written, arranged and performed by Angela Winbush, except where noted.

No.	Title	Length
1.	"It's the Real Thing"	4:47
2.	"No More Tears"	4:48
3.	"Thank You Love"	4:57
4.	"Lay Your Troubles Down" (Duet with Ronald Isley)	5:03
5.	"Precious"	5:53
6.	"Please Bring Your Love Back"	4:58
7.	"Menage à Trois"	5:56
8.	"I've Learned to Respect (The Power of Love)"	6:28
9.	"I'll Never Be The Same"	5:11

== Personnel ==
- Angela Winbush – Lead & Backing Vocals, Keyboards, Synthesizers, Piano, Programming, Synthesized Bass, Drums, Percussion, Drum Programming
- Ronald Isley – Backing Vocals
- Angela Winbush, Katrina McKnight, Majela Walker, Rhonda Campbell, Jeff Lorenzen, Marvin Isley, Ronald Isley, Scotty Scott - Backing Vocals (Track: 1)
- Nathan East – Bass (Tracks: 4–8)
- Sekou Bunch – Electric Bass (Tracks: 1–3)
- John Robinson – Drums (Tracks: 4–6,8)
- Rayford Griffin – Drums [Additional] (Tracks: 1–3)
- Gerald Albright – Saxophone, Soloist (Tracks: 4–5)
- Tony Maiden – Guitar: (Tracks: 1–3)
- Paul Jackson, Jr. – Guitar (Tracks: 7,9)
- Paulinho da Costa – Percussion: (Tracks: 4–6)
- Greg "Fast Fingers" Phillinganes – Piano [Acoustic] (Tracks: 3–5)
- Michael Schlesinger – Keyboards & Programming

== Production ==
- Executive Producer: Ronald Isley
- Producer, Written-By, Arranger: Angela Winbush
- Assistant Engineers: [Recording, Assisted By] Darin Prindle, Dennis Stefani, Mitch Gibson
- Recorded & Engineered By Jeff Lorenzen
- Mixed: Jeff Lorenzen
- Mixing Assistant: Darin Prindle

== Charts ==
Chart (1989)	Peak position
US Billboard 200	113
US Top R&B/Hip-Hop Albums (Billboard)	12

=== Singles ===
Year	Single	Chart positions	
Year	Single	US R&B	US Dance
1989	"It's the Real Thing"	2	—
1989	"No More Tears"	12	—
1990	"Lay Your Troubles Down"	10	—
1990	"Please Bring Your Love Back"	70	—
