= Run to Me (Angela Winbush song) =

Single by Angela Winbush

from the album Sharp
- Released: 1987
- Genre: Funk, dance-pop
- Length: 3:45
- Label: Polygram
- Songwriter(s): Angela Winbush
- Producer(s): Angela Winbush

Angela Winbush singles chronology
"Angel" (1987)	"Run to Me" (1987)	"C'est Toi (It's You)" (1988)

"Run to Me" is a song by American R&B singer Angela Winbush. The song is the second single from her first solo album, Sharp. The single reached number four on the Billboard R&B chart, following her debut single, "Angel", which spent two weeks at the top of the chart. The singles music video was choreographed by singer Paula Abdul, who is also featured as a dancer in the video.

A video for "Run to Me" was released as a download on iTunes in May 2007.

== Track listing ==
A1."Run to Me" (Club Remix) - 5:55
A2."Run to Me" (LP Version) - 4:47
B3."Run to Me" (7" Version) - 3:42
B4."Run to Me" (12" Dub Remix) - 6:15

- Remixes produced by Bruce Forest and Frank Heller.

== Charts ==
Chart (1988)	Peak position
U.S. Billboard Hot Black Singles	4
U.S. Billboard Hot Dance Club Play	32
