= The Whole Scenario =

Studio album by LeVert
- Released: 1997
- Genre: R&B
- Label: Atlantic
- Producer: Gerald Levert, Marc Gordon, Edwin "Tony" Nicholas

LeVert chronology
For Real Tho' (1993)	The Whole Scenario (1997)	The Best of LeVert (2001)

The Whole Scenario is the final studio album by the American R&B group LeVert, released in 1997.

The album peaked at No. 49 on the Billboard 200.

== Production ==
Yo-Yo and Queen Pen appear on the song "Tru Dat", the album's first single; Missy Elliott contributed to "Keys to My House". The album was produced by Gerald Levert, Marc Gordon, and Edwin "Tony" Nicholas. Gerald Levert blamed the album's relatively poor chart performance on its troubled production and his disagreements with Gordon. Mad Lion raps on "You Keep Me Comin'".

== Critical reception ==
Professional ratings
Review scores
Source	Rating
AllMusic	2/5 stars
The Commercial Appeal	3/4 stars
The Encyclopedia of Popular Music	3/5 stars
MusicHound R&B: The Essential Album Guide	2.5/5 stars
The State	4.5/5 stars

The Austin American-Statesman thought that "the old LeVert who attracted so many romance-starved women has now been replaced by three men who are trying a little too hard to keep up with the new R&B artists." The Miami Herald wrote that, "while the trio smoothly harmonizes when the tempo calls for it, the music is too slick, too processed and lacks distinction." The Akron Beacon Journal opined that "the entire album is worth a listen, but quickly skip to the lush, practically perfect 'Like Water' ... the beautiful song uses violins, violas, a harp, an English horn, a flute, and other instruments not usually found on Levert's productions."

AllMusic wrote that "although the album has some clear contemporary hip-hop influences, it works because LeVert hasn't lost sight of their primary strengths as a soulful vocal group."

== Track listing ==
No.	Title	Length
1.	"Whole Scenario"
2.	"Do It Right Here"
3.	"You Keep Me Comin'"
4.	"True Dat"
5.	"Sorry Is"
6.	"Swing My Way"
7.	"Like Water"
8.	"Keys to My House"
9.	"Playground"
10.	"I'll Get It Done"
11.	"Ain't No Thang"
12.	"Mama's House"
13.	"True Dat (Hip Hop Remix)"
