= René & Angela (album) =

Studio album by René & Angela
- Released: June 22, 1980
- Recorded: 1979–80
- Genre: Soul, R&B
- Label: Capitol
- Producer: Bobby Watson, Skip Drinkwater

René & Angela chronology
René & Angela (1980)	Wall to Wall (1981)

René & Angela is the debut album by American singing duo René & Angela. It was released on June 22, 1980 by Capitol Records.

== Critical reception ==
In review made before album release, Billboard editors found that the voices of performers complement one another into the perfect balance. Together with backing instruments it help to make a very stylistic debut.

== Track listing ==
All tracks composed by René Moore and Angela Winbush; except where indicated

1. "Do You Really Love Me" – 3:21
2. "Turn It Out" – 4:20
3. "Everything We Do" – 5:27
4. "Hotel California" – (Don Felder, Glenn Frey, Don Henley) – 4:49
5. "I Don't Know (Where Love Comes From)" – 4:15
6. "Free and Easy" – 5:50
7. "Love Won't Slip Away" – 4:36
8. "Strangers Again" – 2:58
