= I'm Still =

Single by LeVert

from the album I Get Hot
- B-side: "I Want Too"
- Released: 1985
- Genre: R&B
- Length: 6:18 (album version); 4:04 (single edit)
- Label: Tempre
- Songwriter(s): Gerald Levert, Eddie Levert
- Producer(s): Gerald Levert

LeVert singles chronology
"I'm Still" (1985)	"All in the Way You Dance" (1985)

"I'm Still" is a song performed by American contemporary R&B group LeVert. The song is the opening track from the group's debut album I Get Hot and was issued as the album's first single. The song was produced by lead singer Gerald Levert, and it peaked at #70 on the Billboard R&B chart in 1985.

== Chart positions ==
Chart (1985)	Peak position
US Hot R&B/Hip-Hop Singles & Tracks (Billboard)	70
