= Bloodline (LeVert album) =

Studio album by LeVert
- Released: 1986
- Recorded: 1986
- Studios: Dawnbreaker (Los Angeles, California); Sigma Sound, Sound Palace and Unique (New York City, New York); Palace and Kapperhead Productions, Inc. (Canton, Ohio)
- Genre: R&B
- Length: 42:22
- Label: Atlantic
- Producers: Keg Johnson, Wilmer Raglin, James Mtume, Eddie Levert, Gerald LeVert, Marc Gordon

LeVert chronology
I Get Hot (1985)	Bloodline (1986)	The Big Throwdown (1987)

Singles from Bloodline
- 1. "(Pop, Pop, Pop, Pop) Goes My Mind" Released: 1986; 2. "Let's Go Out Tonight" Released: 1986; 3. "Fascination" Released: 1987

Bloodline is the second album by the R&B group LeVert, released in 1986. It was their first album for Atlantic Records.

The album reached number eight on the Billboard R&B Albums chart.

== Critical reception ==
Professional ratings
Review scores
Source	Rating
AllMusic	3/5 stars
The Encyclopedia of Popular Music	3/5 stars
The Rolling Stone Album Guide	2.5/5 stars

The Los Angeles Times wrote that "this trio is fully committed to melody and feeling, making for an effective update of the sweet sounds associated with the street harmonizing the O'Jays themselves started with more than 25 years ago."

== Track listing ==
1. "(Pop, Pop, Pop, Pop) Goes My Mind" (Gerald LeVert, Marc Gordon) - 5:54
2. "Fascination" (Gerald LeVert, Marc Gordon, James Mtume) - 4:29
3. "Pose" (Wilmer Raglin Jr., William F. Zimmermann) - 6:12
4. "I Start You Up, You Turn Me On" (James Mtume) - 4:31
5. "Kiss and Make Up" (Gerald LeVert, Marc Gordon) - 4:45
6. "Let's Go Out Tonight" (Gerald LeVert) - 5:17
7. "Grip" (Gerald LeVert) - 5:57
8. "Looking for Love" (Gerald LeVert, Marc Gordon) - 5:17

== Personnel ==
LeVert

- Gerald LeVert – lead vocals, backing vocals, arrangements (1, 7, 8), keyboards (5, 6)
- Sean LeVert – percussion (5, 6)
- Marc Gordon – keyboards (1, 2, 4–6), backing vocals (2, 4), arrangements (8)

Additional personnel

- Ramsey Embick – keyboards (1)
- William Zimmerman – keyboards (1, 3), arrangements (3)
- James Mtume – keyboards (2, 4), backing vocals (2, 4)
- Dennis Williams – keyboard programming (5, 6), arrangements (5, 6)
- David T. Walker – guitars (1, 3)
- Ed Moore – guitars (2, 4)
- Craig Cooper – guitars (3, 7, 8), keyboards (7, 8)
- Robert Cunningham – guitars (5, 6)
- Mike Ferguson – bass (5, 6)
- Ricky Brown – electric bass (8)
- Ken Johnson – arrangements (1, 7)
- Wilmer Raglin – arrangements (1, 7)
- Paulinho da Costa – percussion (3, 7, 8)
- Tawatha Agee – backing vocals (2, 4)
- Tyrone Brunson – backing vocals (2, 4)
- Philip Field – backing vocals (2, 4)

Production

- Ken Johnson – producer (1, 3, 7, 8)
- Wilmer Raglin – producer (1, 3, 7, 8)
- James Mtume – producer (2, 4)
- Eddie Levert – producer (5, 6)
- Marc Gordon – producer (5, 6)
- Gerald Levert – producer (5, 6)
- Gary Dobbins – engineer (1, 3, 7, 8)
- James Dougherty – engineer (2, 4)
- Shameek "The Mix" Gonsalves – engineer (5, 6)
- Dennis King – mastering at Atlantic Studios (New York, NY)

== Charts ==
Chart (1986)	Peak position
Billboard Pop Albums	192
Billboard Top Soul Albums	8

=== Singles ===
Year	Single	Chart positions
Year	Single	US R&B
1986	"(Pop, Pop, Pop, Pop) Goes My Mind"	1
1986	"Let's Go Out Tonight"	14
1987	"Fascination"	26
