= For Real Tho' =

Studio album by LeVert
- Released: March 16, 1993
- Genre: R&B
- Length: 56:32
- Label: Atlantic
- Producers: Gerald Levert; Marc Gordon

LeVert chronology
Rope a Dope Style (1990)	For Real Tho' (1993)	The Whole Scenario (1997)

Singles from For Real Tho'
- 1. "Good Ol' Days" Released: February 25, 1993; 2. "ABC-123" Released: May 13, 1993; 3. "Do the Thangs" Released: August 12, 1993

For Real Tho' is the sixth studio album by the American contemporary R&B group LeVert, released in 1993 via Atlantic Records. It peaked at No. 35 on the Billboard 200 and No. 5 on the Billboard R&B chart.

Three singles were released from the album: "Good Ol' Days", "ABC-123" and "Do the Thangs". "ABC-123" was the most successful single from the album, peaking at No. 46 on the Billboard Hot 100 in 1993.

The album was certified gold by the RIAA on June 9, 1993.

== Production ==
The album was produced by Gerald Levert and Marc Gordon. Gordon began working on For Real Tho' while Gerald was promoting his 1991 solo album.

== Critical reception ==
Professional ratings
Review scores
Source	Rating
AllMusic	2.5/5 stars
Chicago Tribune	3/4 stars
The Encyclopedia of Popular Music	2/5 stars
Entertainment Weekly	B

The Baltimore Sun wrote that "Gerald Levert's lead vocals don't just underscore the music's emotional content; they also reinforce the rhythm." The Washington Post thought that "Gerald is singing better than ever, which is one of the reasons why the trio's latest album ... ranks among its best." USA Today wrote that "Gerald's rugged baritone is sounding more like his dad's every day."

== Track listing ==
No.	Title	Writer(s)	Producer(s)	Length
1.	"Me 'n' You" ( (Note: "Me 'n' You" contains a sample of "Dazz" as performed by Brick.))	Marc Gordon	Gerald Levert; Marc Gordon	4:26
2.	"Clap Your Hands" ( (Note: "Clap Your Hands" contains a sample of "Funky President (People It's Bad)" as performed by James Brown.))	Gerald Levert; Marc Gordon	Gerald Levert; Marc Gordon	3:29
3.	"Tribute Song" ( (Note: "Tribute Song" contains a sample of "King Heroin" as performed by James Brown.))	Marc Gordon	Marc Gordon; James Brown	2:34
4.	"Good Ol' Days"	Gerald Levert; Marc Gordon	Gerald Levert; Marc Gordon	5:00
5.	"She's All That (I've Been Looking For)"	Gerald Levert; Marc Gordon; Edwin Nicholas	Gerald Levert; Marc Gordon	4:59
6.	"For Real Tho'" ( (Note: "For Real Tho'" contains a sample of "Sing a Simple Song" as performed by Sly and the Family Stone.))	Gerald Levert; Marc Gordon	Gerald Levert; Marc Gordon	4:03
7.	"Quiet Storm"	Gerald Levert; Marc Gordon	Marc Gordon	7:12
8.	"Do the Thangs"	Marc Gordon	Marc Gordon	5:55
9.	"My Place (Your Place)"	Gerald Levert; Marc Gordon	Gerald Levert; Marc Gordon	6:04
10.	"Say You Will"	Marc Gordon	Marc Gordon	6:50
11.	"ABC-123"	Gerald Levert; Edwin Nicholas; Terry Scott	Gerald Levert; Edwin Nicholas	5:54
Total length:				56:32

== Chart positions ==
Chart (1993)	Peak position
US Billboard 200	35
US R&B Albums (Billboard)	5
