= Addicted to You (LeVert song) =

Single by LeVert

from the album Just Coolin'
- Released: 1988
- Genre: R&B
- Length: 3:52
- Label: Atlantic
- Songwriter(s): Gerald LeVert, Marc Gordon, Eddie LeVert Sr.

LeVert singles chronology
"Sweet Sensation" (1988)	"Addicted to You" (1988)	"Pull Over" (1988)

"Addicted to You" is a song by LeVert, released as a single in 1988. The single peaked at number one on the Billboard Black Singles chart for two weeks and was featured in the film, Coming to America.
