= The Big Throwdown =

Studio album by LeVert
- Released: July 27, 1987
- Recorded: 1986–1987
- Studios: Sigma Sound, Philadelphia, Pennsylvania; Great Tracks, Cleveland, Ohio; QCA, Cincinnati, Ohio; Mad Hatter, Los Angeles, California; Encore, Burbank, California; Unique Recording, New York City
- Genre: New jack swing
- Length: 46:24
- Label: Atlantic
- Producers: Gerald Levert, Marc Gordon, Reggie Calloway, Craig Cooper

LeVert chronology
Bloodline (1986)	The Big Throwdown (1987)	Just Coolin' (1988)

Singles from The Big Throwdown
- 1. "Casanova" Released: June 20, 1987; 2. "My Forever Love" Released: 1987; 3. "Sweet Sensation" Released: 1988

The Big Throwdown is the third album by Cleveland, Ohio-based R&B group LeVert.

== Reception ==
Professional ratings
Review scores
Source	Rating
AllMusic	4.5/5 stars
The Rolling Stone Album Guide	3/5 stars

Released in 1987, led by the number one R&B and top five Pop single, "Casanova", this album would reach number three on the Billboard R&B Albums charts.

== Track listing ==
1. "Casanova" (Reggie Calloway) – 6:25
2. "Good Stuff" (Gerald Levert, Tommie Miller) – 4:20
3. "Don't U Think It's Time" (Gerald Levert, Marc Gordon) – 4:28
4. "My Forever Love" (Gerald Levert, Marc Gordon) – 4:35
5. "Love the Way U Love Me" (Marc Gordon) – 4:42
6. "Sweet Sensation" (Gerald Levert, Marc Gordon) – 4:20
7. "In n Out" (Gerald Levert, Sean Levert, Marc Gordon) – 4:30
8. "Temptation" (Reggie Calloway, Vincent Calloway, Joel Davis, Gloria Larson) – 8:48
9. "Throwdown" (Gerald Levert, Sean Levert, Marc Gordon) – 4:16

== Personnel ==
LeVert

- Gerald Levert – lead vocals, backing vocals, drum programming (7), arrangements, vocal arrangements
- Sean Levert – backing vocals, vocal arrangements
- Marc Gordon – backing vocals, keyboards (2–7), string and bell arrangements (7), arrangements, vocal arrangements

Additional musicians

- Joel Davis – keyboards (1, 8)
- David Ervin – keyboards, arrangements (1, 8), drums (1, 8)
- Odeen Mays Jr. – keyboards (1, 8)
- Craig Cooper – arrangements (1–6, 8, 9), keyboards (2–6, 9), drum programming (2–7, 9)
- Dan Rodowicz – additional synthesizers, strings
- Mark Rossi – additional synthesizers, strings
- Jim Salamone – Fairlight programming and sampling, percussion (5)
- Gene Robinson – guitars (1, 8)
- Johnny "T" Jones – additional guitars (1, 8)
- Robert Cunningham – guitars (2, 3, 5–7, 9)
- Norman Harris – guitars (4–6)
- Mike Ferguson – bass (2, 4–6)
- Sam Peak – saxophone (4, 6, 9)
- Billy Terrell – string and bell arrangements (1–6, 8, 9), additional synthesizer and string arrangements, conductor
- Eddie Levert – vocal arrangements
- Donald Murphy – additional backing vocals
- Dwayne Simon – additional backing vocals

Production

- Reggie Calloway – producer (1, 8), assistant mix engineer (2–7, 9)
- Vincent Calloway – co-producer (1, 8), assistant mix engineer (2–7, 9)
- Craig Cooper – producer (2–7, 9)
- Marc Gordon – producer (2–7, 9)
- Gerald Levert – producer (2–7, 9)
- Keith Cohen – mix engineer (1)
- Anne Frager – recording (2–7, 9)
- Bruce Seifert – recording (2–7, 9)
- Mike Tarsia – recording (2–7, 9), mixing (2–7, 9)
- Craig Burbidge – mix engineer (2–7, 9)
- Jim Krause – mix engineer (2–7, 9)
- Eddie DeLena – mix engineer (8)
- Elmer Flores – assistant mix engineer (1)
- Jim Greene – assistant mix engineer (2–7, 9)
- Rob Harvey – assistant mix engineer (2–7, 9)
- Donnie Kraft – assistant mix engineer (2–7, 9)
- Steve Moeller – assistant mix engineer (2–7, 9)
- Russ Bracher – assistant mix engineer (8)
- Scott McMinn – recording assistant (2–7, 9)
- Adam Silverman – recording assistant (2–7, 9)
- Nimitr Sarikanada – mastering at Masterworks Recording, Inc. (Philadelphia, Pennsylvania)
- Eddie Levert – cover concept
- Bob Defrin – art direction
- David Michael Kennedy – photography
- Irvin McKnight – wardrobe
- Jane Davenport – stylist

== Charts ==
=== Weekly charts ===
Chart (1987)	Peak position
US Billboard 200	32
US Top R&B/Hip-Hop Albums (Billboard)	3

=== Year-end charts ===
Chart (1987)	Position
US Top R&B/Hip-Hop Albums (Billboard)	45

=== Singles ===
Year	Single	Chart positions		
Year	Single	US Pop	US R&B	US Dance
1987	"Casanova"	5	1	27
1987	"My Forever Love"	-	2	-
1988	"Sweet Sensation"	-	4	-
