= Save Your Love (Rene & Angela song) =

1985 song

"Save Your Love (For #1)"

Single by Rene & Angela

from the album Street Called Desire
- B-side: "Instrumental"
- Released: 1985
- Genre: Funk; Soul
- Length: 4:20
- Label: Mercury Records
- Songwriters: René Moore; Angela Winbush
- Producers: Bobby Watson; Bruce Swedien; René Moore; Angela Winbush

Rene & Angela singles chronology
"My First Love" (1983)	"Save Your Love (For #1)" (1985)	"I'll Be Good" (1985)

"Save Your Love (For #1)" is a 1985 song written and sung by the duo René & Angela from their album Street Called Desire. It was their first single (and album) for Mercury Records. The single also featured labelmate Kurtis Blow performing a rap, making it one of the first times hip hop artists collaborated with R&B artists on their work. The single was number one on the Billboard R&B chart for two weeks and was the duo's biggest hit on that chart.

== Tracklists ==
U.S. 7-inch single – Mercury 880 731-7

1. "Save Your Love (For #1)" – 4:10
2. "Save Your Love (For #1)" (Instrumental) – 4:10

U.S. 12-inch single – Mercury 880 731-1

1. "Save Your Love (For #1)" (Club Mix) – 5:25
2. "Save Your Love (For #1)" (Instrumental) – 4:10
3. "Save Your Love (For #1)" (Vocal) – 4:15
