= Just Coolin' (song) =

Song by LeVert and Heavy D

from the album Just Coolin'
- Recorded: 1988
- Studio: Sigma Sound, Philadelphia, Pennsylvania
- Genre: R&B
- Label: Atlantic
- Songwriter(s): Gerald Levert, Marc Gordon
- Producer(s): Gerald Levert, Marc Gordon

"Just Coolin'" is a 1988 song collaboration between LeVert and Heavy D, written by Gerald Levert and Marc Gordon. The single peaked at number one on the Billboard Hot Black Singles chart, and was Heavy D's only number-one hit, and Levert's fourth number one on the chart. "Just Coolin'" also peaked at number nineteen on the dance chart.

== Music video ==
The official music video was directed by Jane Simpson.
