= Your Smile (song) =

Single by René & Angela

from the album Street Called Desire
- Released: February 5, 1986
- Genre: Soul, R&B
- Length: 4:09
- Label: Mercury
- Songwriters: René Moore, Angela Winbush
- Producers: René Moore, Angela Winbush

René & Angela singles chronology
"I'll Be Good" (1985)	"Your Smile" (1986)	"You Don't Have to Cry" (1986)

"Your Smile" is a song by American singing duo René & Angela. Released on February 5, 1986, it was the third single from the duo's 1985 album, Street Called Desire. "Your Smile" was the duo's second number-one single on Billboard's R&B chart. It was also a minor hit on the Billboard Hot 100 peaking at number sixty-two. Along with the track "Drive My Love", "Your Smile" was a minor hit on the U.S. Dance chart, peaking at number forty-seven.

In a 2024 interview, Angela Winbush revealed "Your Smile" was written about her grandmother, who died during the recording of Street Called Desire.
