= Just Coolin' (album) =

Studio album by LeVert
- Released: October 1988
- Recorded: 1988
- Genre: R&B
- Length: 49:49
- Label: Atlantic
- Producer: LeVert

LeVert chronology
The Big Throwdown (1987)	Just Coolin' (1988)	Rope a Dope Style (1990)

Singles from Just Coolin'
- 1. "Addicted to You" Released: 1988; 2. "Pull Over" Released: 1988; 3. "Just Coolin'" Released: 1989; 4. "Gotta Get the Money" Released: 1989; 5. "Smilin'" Released: 1989

Just Coolin' is the fourth album by the R&B group LeVert, released in 1988.

== Production ==
The group wrote and produced the entire album, the first time they had done so.

== Critical reception ==
Professional ratings
Review scores
Source	Rating
AllMusic	4.5/5 stars
The Encyclopedia of Popular Music	3/5 stars
Los Angeles Times	2.5/4 stars
The Rolling Stone Album Guide	4/5 stars

The Rolling Stone Album Guide wrote that "the beats are bigger, the funk is deeper, and LeVert seems in the process of reinventing its whole sound." USA Today called the album the group's best to date, and praised the "delicious" ballads.

== Track listing ==
1. "Pull Over" (Gerald Levert, Marc Gordon) - 4:07
2. "Just Coolin'" (feat. Heavy D) (Gerald LeVert, Marc Gordon) - 4:19
3. "Gotta Get the Money" (Gerald LeVert, Marc Gordon)) - 4:45
4. "Take Your Time" (Gerald LeVert, Marc Gordon) - 5:04
5. "Join in the Fun" (Gerald LeVert, Marc Gordon) - 3:28
6. "Let's Get Romantic" (Gerald LeVert, Marc Gordon) - 4:23
7. "Feel Real" (Gerald LeVert, Marc Gordon) - 5:52
8. "Smilin'" (Gerald LeVert, Marc Gordon) - 4:18
9. "Start Me up Again" (Gerald LeVert, Marc Gordon) - 4:18
10. "Loveable" (Gerald LeVert, Marc Gordon) - 5:23
11. "Addicted to You" (Gerald LeVert, Marc Gordon, Eddie LeVert Sr.) - 3:52

== Personnel ==
- Gerald LeVert – Lead and Backing Vocals
- Sean LeVert – Backing Vocals
- Marc Gordon – Keyboards, Backing Vocals
- David Ervin – Drums, Keyboards
- Gene Robinson, Johnny "T" Jones, Robert Cunningham, Norman Harris – Guitar
- Joel Davis, Odeen Mays, Jr., Craig Cooper, David Ervin – Keyboards
- Mike Ferguson – Bass
- Sam Peak – Saxophone
- Jim Salamone – Percussion

== Charts ==
Chart (1988)	Peak position
Billboard Pop Albums	79
Billboard Top Soul Albums	6

=== Singles ===
Year	Single	Chart positions
Year	Single	US R&B
1988	"Addicted to You"	1
1988	"Pull Over"	2
1989	"Just Coolin'"	1
1989	"Gotta Get the Money"	4
1989	"Smilin'"	16
