= René & Angela =

American R&B duo

- Origin: United States
- Genres: R&B; soul; post-disco
- Years active: 1977–1987
- Labels: Capitol; Mercury
- Past members: René Moore; Angela Winbush

René & Angela were an American R&B duo consisting of musical artists and producers René Moore and Angela Winbush. They formed in 1977 and disbanded in 1987. They are most remembered for their 1985 song "I'll Be Good".

== Career ==
They recorded three albums for Capitol Records: their 1980 self-titled debut René & Angela, the second album Wall to Wall and their final album for the label, 1983's Rise.

They later moved to Mercury Records to release 1985's Street Called Desire. Despite the success of the album, the duo disbanded by the end of 1986. Disagreements and conflicts caused tension with the two singers. Moore claimed the source of tension was due to Winbush lending her songwriting and production talents to other artists – most notably, The Isley Brothers, with whom she co-wrote and produced their 1987 album Smooth Sailin'. However, Winbush said the demise of the group was due to Moore's violent behavior- including an onstage incident in Cleveland, Ohio in 1986, as well as Winbush singing sole lead on the song "Your Smile", which became a number one hit on the R&B chart.

Winbush said of the dissolution of their partnership:

"It was a shame to break up just when we finally got hot. PolyGram didn't want us to break up. But there was no choice. I couldn't work with him anymore."

The duo had a less than amicable split and the animosity was so intense that Moore and Winbush had to communicate through attorneys.

Moore and Winbush went on to successful solo careers as performers, songwriters, and producers. Moore lent his songwriting and production talents to Michael Jackson's 1991 Dangerous and 1995 HIStory albums and later formed Multi-Media Communications, which operated radio stations from 2008 to 2012. Winbush went on to score five top ten R&B hits as a solo artist and wrote and/or produced songs for The Isley Brothers, Sheena Easton, Stephanie Mills, and Lalah Hathaway, among others.

== Discography ==
=== Studio albums ===
Year	Album	Peak chart positions		Certifications	Record label
Year	Album	US	US R&B	Certifications	Record label
1980	René & Angela	—	—		Capitol
1981	Wall to Wall	100	15		Capitol
1983	Rise	—	33		Capitol
1985	Street Called Desire	64	5	RIAA: Gold	Mercury
"—" denotes releases that did not chart or were not released in that territory.

=== Compilation albums ===
- The Best of René & Angela: Come My Way (1996, Capitol)
- Classic Masters (2002, Capitol)

=== Singles ===
Year	Title	Peak chart Positions						Album
Year	Title	US	US R&B	US Dan	BEL (FL)	NLD	UK	Album
1980	"Do You Really Love Me"	—	43	—	—	—	—	René & Angela
1980	"Everything We Do"	—	39	—	—	—	—	René & Angela
1981	"I Love You More"	—	14	31	—	—	—	Wall to Wall
1981	"Wall to Wall"	—	37	—	—	—	—	Wall to Wall
1982	"Imaginary Playmates"	—	26	—	—	—	—	Wall to Wall
1983	"Banging the Boogie"	—	33	—	23	—	—	Rise
1983	"My First Love"	—	12	—	—	—	—	Rise
1985	"Save Your Love (For #1)"	101	1	3	—	17	66	Street Called Desire
1985	"I'll Be Good"	47	4	7	—	21	22	Street Called Desire
1985	"Secret Rendezvous"	—	—	—	—	—	54	Wall to Wall
1985	"Your Smile"	62	1	47	—	—	—	Street Called Desire
1986	"You Don't Have to Cry"	75	2	—	—	—	—	Street Called Desire
1986	"No How – No Way"	—	29	—	—	—	—	Street Called Desire
"—" denotes releases that did not chart or were not released in that territory.
