= Ronald Isley =

American singer and songwriter (born 1941)

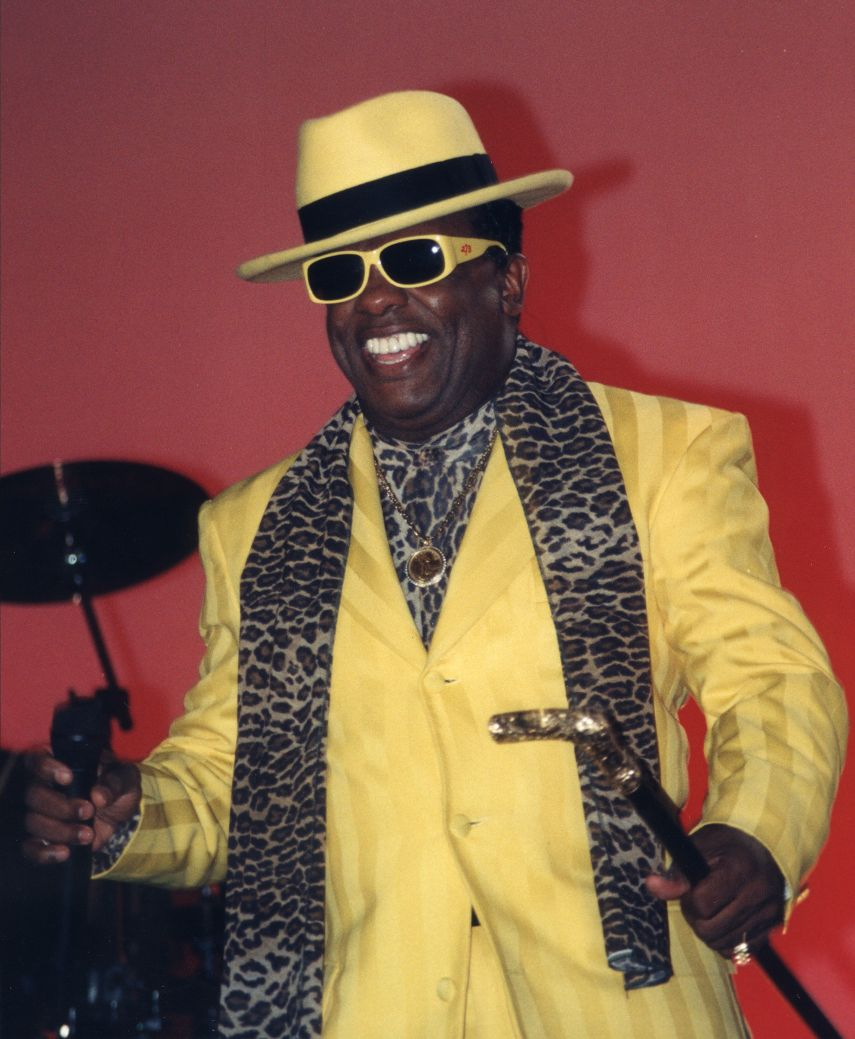
- Isley in 1996

Background information
- Also known as: Mr. Biggs
- Born: May 21, 1941 (age 85); Cincinnati, Ohio, U.S.
- Genres: R&B; soul; funk; quiet storm
- Occupations: Singer; songwriter; record producer
- Instrument: Vocals
- Works: Solo; Isley Brothers
- Years active: 1954–present
- Labels: T-Neck; Def Soul; Island Def Jam; eOne
- Member of: The Isley Brothers
- Spouses: Margret Tinsley (m. 1960; div. 1987): 1969 their daughter Tia Isley, was born.; Angela Winbush (m. 1993; div. 2002) Kandy Johnson (m. 2005): 2006 their son Ronald Isley, Jr., was born.
- Website: Official Webpage

Ronald Isley (/ˈaɪzli/ EYEZ-lee; born May 21, 1941) is an American singer, songwriter, and record producer. Isley is the lead singer, a founding member, and last surviving original member of the family music group The Isley Brothers.

== Early life ==
Born in 1941 to Sallye Bernice (née Bell) and O'Kelly Isley Sr, Isley was the third of six brothers (O'Kelly Isley Jr., Rudolph Isley, Vernon Isley, Ernie Isley, Marvin Isley). The youngest of the original four Isley Brothers was Vernon (b: 18 June 1943 - d: 24 Sept 1954); who at the age of 11 was struck and killed by a car while riding his bicycle.

== Career ==
By his early teens, Isley was singing regularly with his brothers in church tours and also first appeared on TV on Ted Mack's Amateur Hour. In 1957, 16-year-old Isley and his two elder brothers O'Kelly and Rudy then 19 and 18 moved to New York to pursue a music career. While in New York, Isley and his brothers began recording doo-wop for local labels before landing a major deal with RCA Records in 1959, where the trio wrote and released their debut single "Shout". By the summer of 1959, the Isley family had moved from Cincinnati to a home in Englewood, New Jersey.

Ron has been the Isley Brothers' longest-standing member as well as the main lead vocalist, occasionally sharing with his older brothers. In 1969, Isley reformed T-Neck Records with his brothers in a need to produce themselves without the control of record labels, forming the label shortly after ending a brief tenure with Motown. In 1973, the group's style and sound changed following the release of the 3 + 3 album where brothers Ernie Isley and Marvin Isley and in-law Chris Jasper joined the founding brothers' full-time. The younger brothers had been providing instrumental help for the brothers since the late 1960s. By the mid-1970s, Isley was living in Teaneck, New Jersey.

After Kelly Isley's death in 1986 and Rudy Isley's departure to the ministry in 1989, Ronald has carried on with the Isley Brothers name either as a solo artist or with accompanying help from younger brothers, particularly Ernie. In 1990, Isley scored a top-ten duet with Rod Stewart with a cover of his brothers' hit "This Old Heart of Mine (Is Weak for You)", and in 2003 Ronald recorded a solo album, Here I Am: Bacharach Meets Isley, with Burt Bacharach. In addition, Ron Isley became a sought-after hook singer for R. Kelly, Warren G, 2Pac and UGK. Isley released his first solo album Mr. I on November 30, 2010. The album includes the first single "No More". It debuted at number 50 on the Billboard 200, selling 22,243 copies. It was his first solo album to crack that chart.

In 2010, Isley received a "Legend Award" at the Soul Train Music Awards. In 2013, Ronald released his second solo album This Song Is For You sign labels eOne. Ronald received a nominees Independent R&B/Soul Artist Performance, at the Soul Train Music Awards. In 2014, Ronald made a cameo appearance in the music video for the Kendrick Lamar song "i".

Including his work on songs recorded by the Isley Brothers and R. Kelly, Isley's singles appeared on the U.S. Billboard Hot 100 charts in six straight decades, from the 1950s ("Shout") through the 2000s ("Contagious"). His 2015 appearance on Lamar's "How Much a Dollar Cost" peaked at number 9 on the Billboard Bubbling Under Hot 100 chart, and his 2021 Isley Brothers track "Friends and Family" failed to hit the main Billboard chart (although it was a Top 50 hit on the R&B and Hip-Hop chart), but do serve to extend his appearances on Billboard charts to eight separate decades.

Ronald Isley was inducted into the Rock and Roll Hall of Fame in 1992 as a member of the Isley Brothers.

== Personal life ==
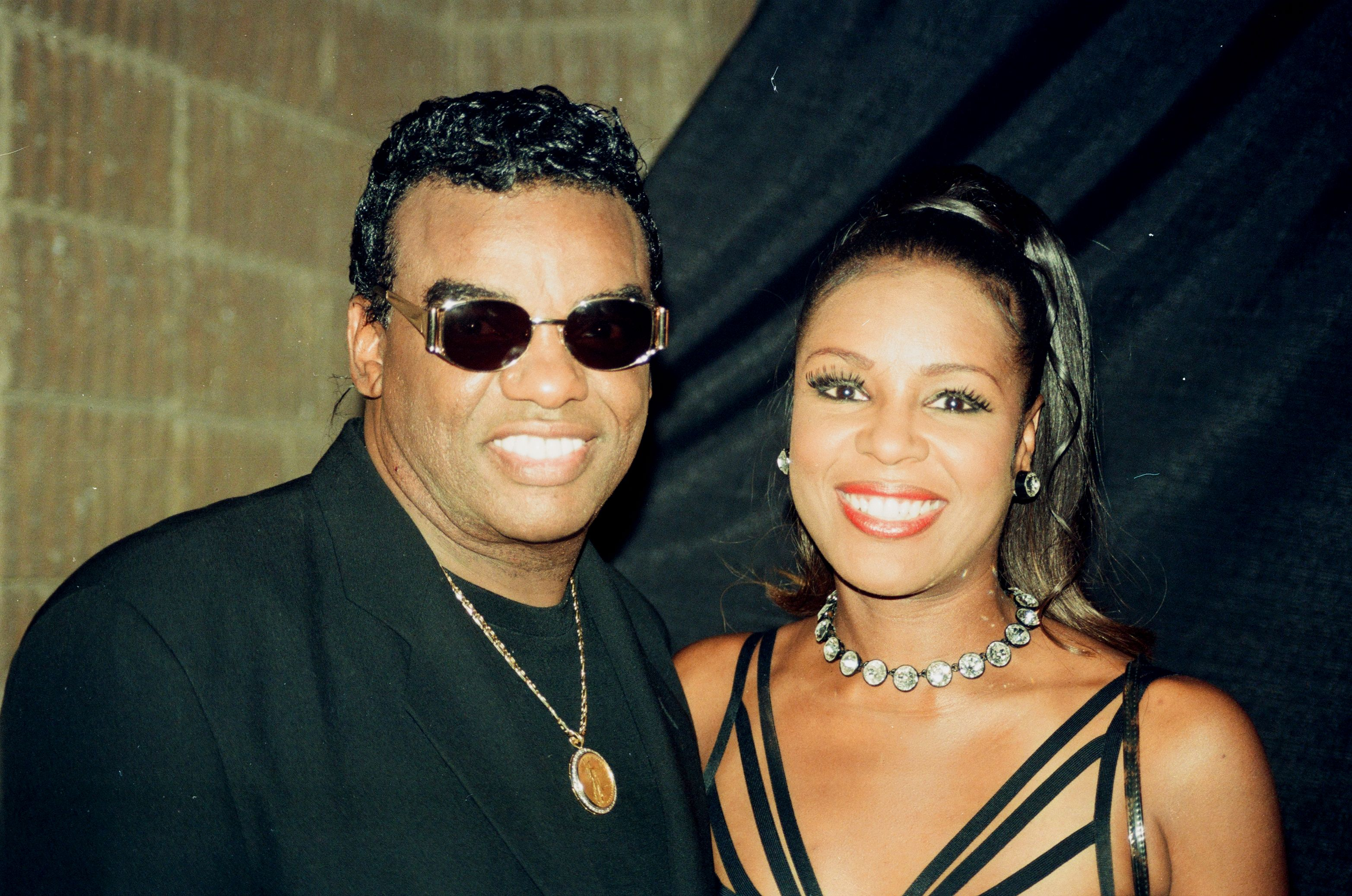
Isley and Winbush in 1996

Isley married Margaret Tinsley in 1960, and in 1969 their daughter Tia Isley was born. In 1993, he married singer Angela Winbush. They had no children during their marriage. The couple divorced in early 2002.

Isley suffered a mild stroke in London in 2004, which halted an Isley Brothers tour. In September 2005, he married background singer Kandy Johnson of the duo JS/Johnson Sisters. Their son, Ronald Isley, Jr., was born in December 2006. Isley resided in St. Louis, but now resides in Los Angeles, with his current wife and son.

=== Tax evasion ===
In 2006, Isley was convicted of tax evasion charges. He was to owe the Internal Revenue Service over $3.1 million in back taxes and sentenced to three years and one month in prison. Isley's sentence was affirmed by the United States Court of Appeals for the Ninth Circuit. Isley was imprisoned at the Federal Correctional Institution in Terre Haute, Indiana, and was scheduled for release on April 13, 2010. He was moved to a half-way house (Dismas House) in St. Louis, following an early departure that October.

== Academic title ==
- Honorary doctorate of music, awarded by the Berklee College of Music, May 7, 2016.
