= LeVert =

American R&B vocal group

- Origin: Cleveland, Ohio, U.S.
- Genres: R&B; new jack swing; soul
- Years active: 1983–1997
- Labels: Atlantic; Rhino
- Past members: Marc Gordon; Gerald Levert (deceased); Sean Levert (deceased)

LeVert was an American R&B vocal group from Cleveland, Ohio, United States. Formed in 1983, LeVert was composed of the late Sean and Gerald Levert (sons of Eddie Levert, founder and lead singer of R&B/Soul vocal group O'Jays) and Marc Gordon.

== Biography ==
The group released their first single, "I'm Still", for Harry Coombes's Tempre label. In 1985, they released their debut album, I Get Hot, which included tracks whose vocals drew strong comparisons to Sean and Gerald Levert's father Eddie. Bloodline followed in 1986, and this album included the band's first big R&B hit "(Pop, Pop, Pop, Pop) Goes My Mind". However, the band's next album, 1987's The Big Throwdown became an even bigger success, on the strength of the Number One R&B hit "Casanova", which gave them a crossover hit on the pop chart (number 5) and also a UK Top 10.

A pair of additional R&B Top Five singles were also released from this album: "My Forever Love" and "Sweet Sensation". The band's success continued with their 1988 follow-up album Just Coolin', which was nominated for Best R&B/Urban Contemporary Album for the 1989 Soul Train Music Awards. Both The Big Throwdown and Just Coolin' received gold certification. Beginning in the 1990s, Gerald began dividing his time between LeVert, and his solo career, but the band went on to release three more albums, and Rhino Records released a greatest hits album in 2001.

Gerald Levert died of a prescription and over the counter drug overdose in November 2006. Sean Levert died in March 2008 from a combination of sarcoidosis and xanax withdrawal while in the Cuyahoga County jail.

== Discography ==
Studio albums

- I Get Hot (1985)
- Bloodline (1986)
- The Big Throwdown (1987)
- Just Coolin' (1988)
- Rope a Dope Style (1990)
- For Real Tho' (1993)
- The Whole Scenario (1997)
