= List of songs recorded by Monica =

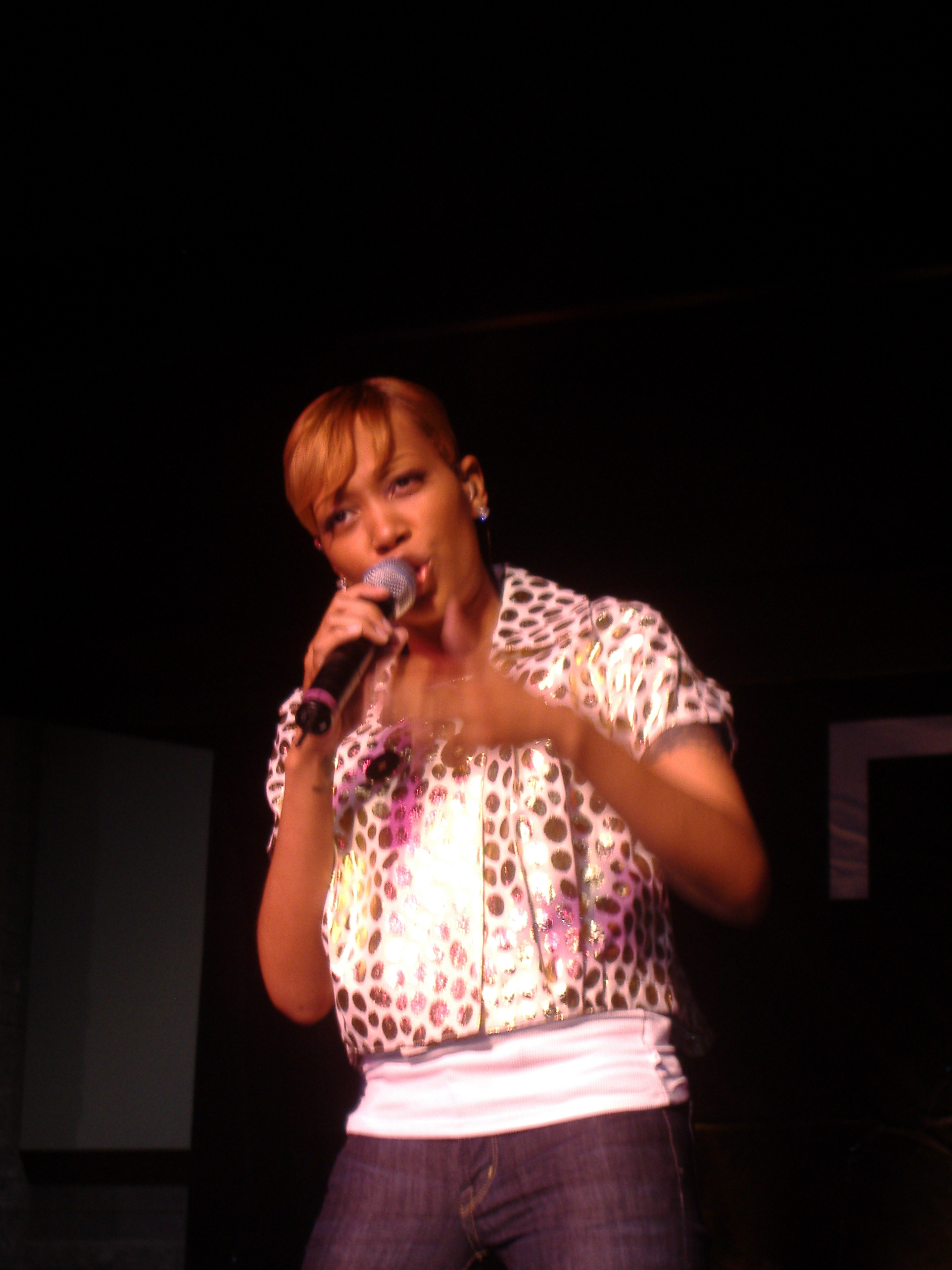
Monica performing in 2007

American recording artist Monica has recorded material for her eight studio albums and has collaborated with other artists for duets and featured songs on their respective albums and charity singles. She is also known to have written, recorded and filmed material that has never been officially released. Many of the singer's unreleased songs have been registered – the majority by her publishing company Mondenise Music – with professional bodies such as the United States Copyright Office, the Songwriters Hall of Fame, Broadcast Music Incorporated (BMI), American Society of Composers, Authors and Publishers (ASCAP), and EMI Music Publishing.

Many officially unreleased Monica songs have been scheduled, at one point, for release on records by the singer, including her seven studio albums Miss Thang (1995), The Boy Is Mine (1998), All Eyez on Me (2002), After the Storm (2003), The Makings of Me (2006), Still Standing (2010), New Life (2012), and Code Red (2015). For varying reasons, the tracks were ultimately rejected and, as of 2016, remain either completely unreleased or have been leaked onto the internet and seen release on mixtapes such as Monica: Made (2007) without gaining an official release. The singer's unreleased material includes songs recorded by Arnold as a solo artist and demo versions of tracks which were eventually re-recorded by other artists, some featuring established artists such as Fantasia, T-Pain, Trey Songz and Young Joc.

== Released songs ==
Key
†	Indicates single release

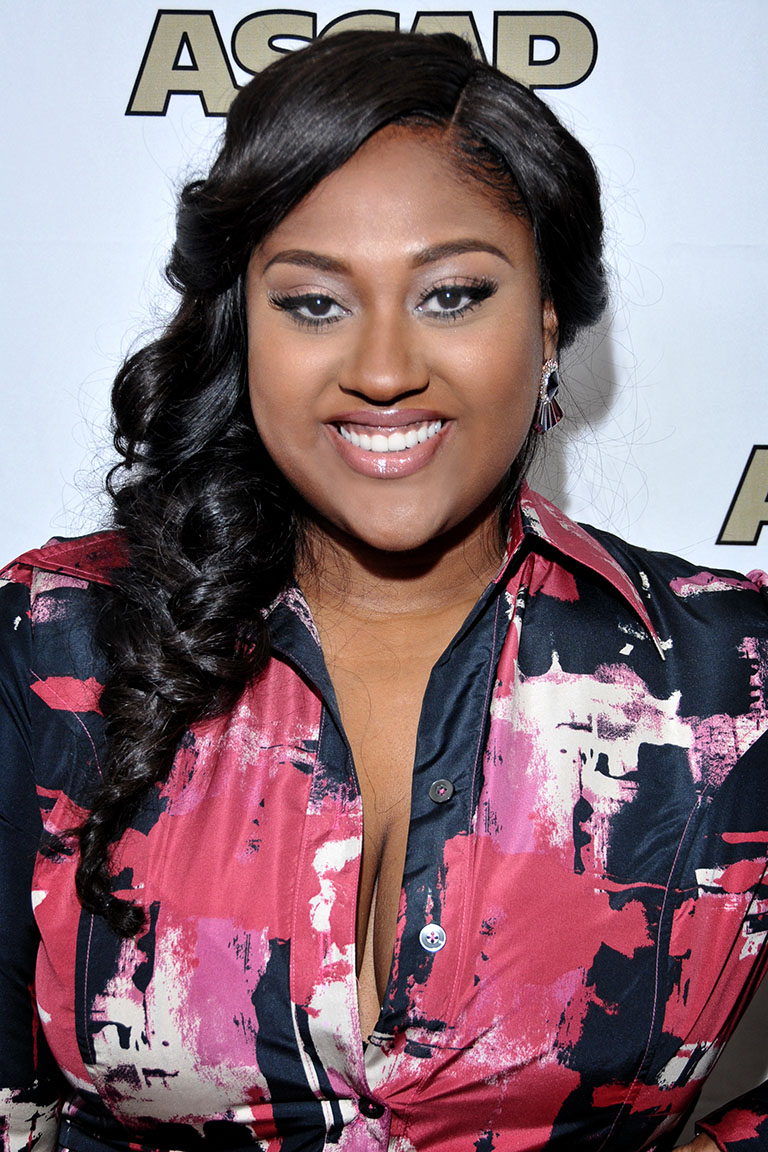
Jazmine Sullivan penned the songs "Anything (To Find You)", "Everything to Me" and "Until It's Gone".

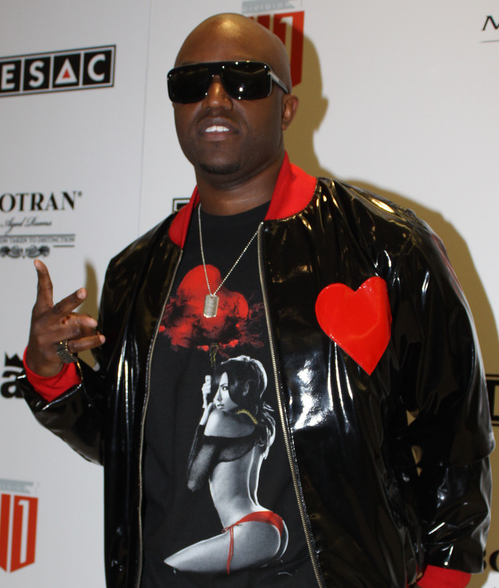
Producer Rico Love co-wrote and produced several songs on New Life.

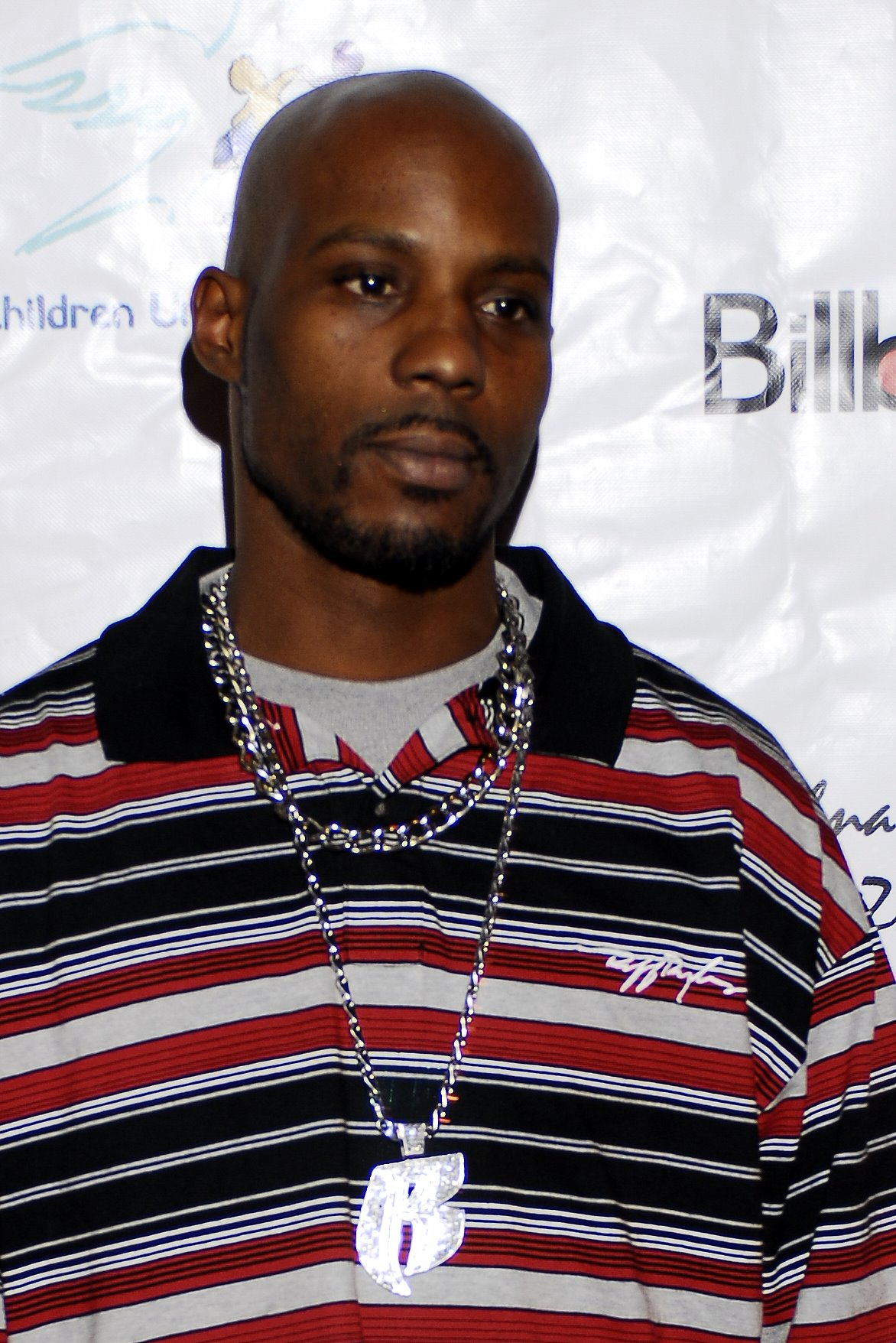
DMX co-wrote "Don't Gotta Go Home", which also appeared on his album Grand Champ.

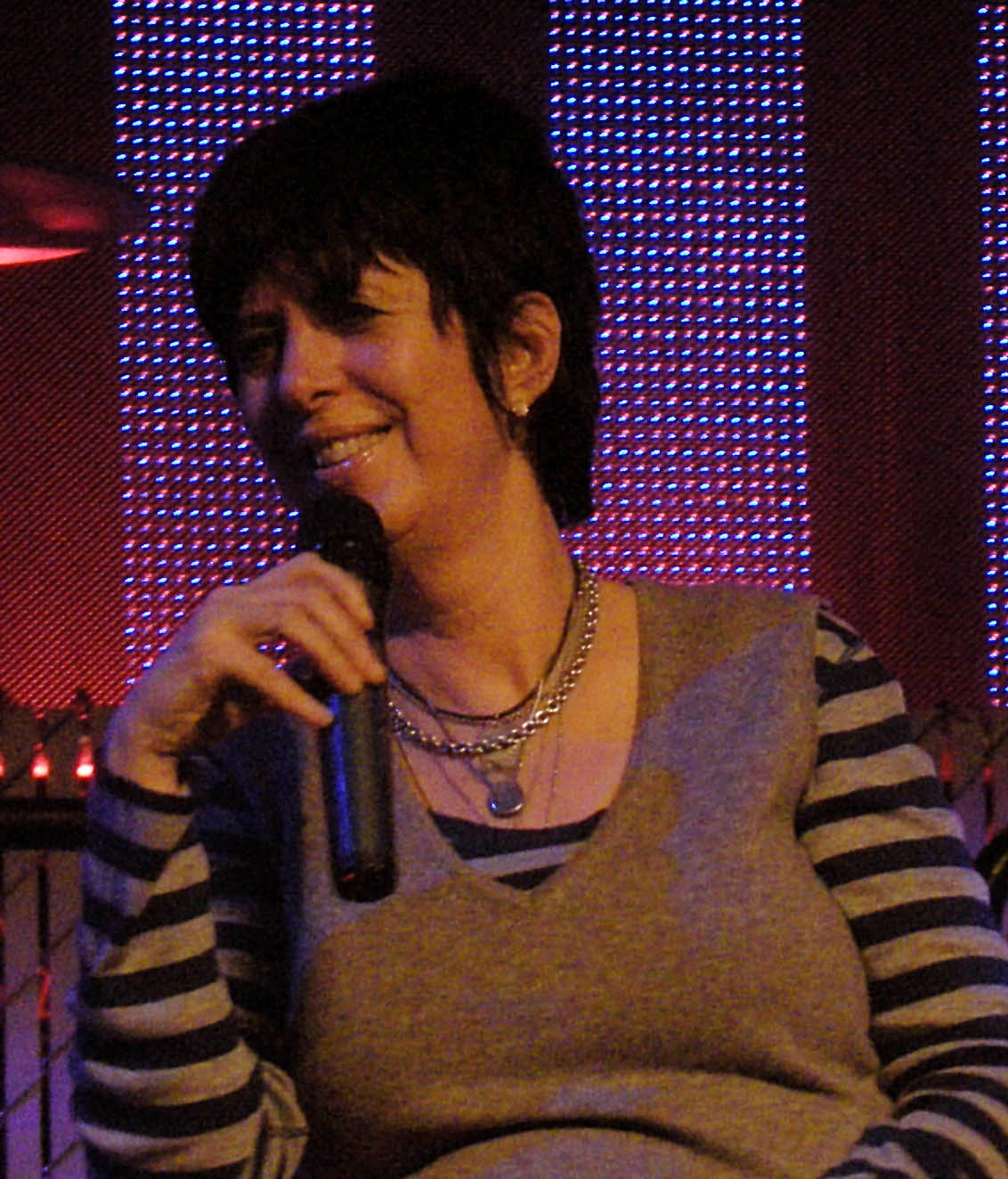
Songwriter Diane Warren wrote "For You I Will" for the Space Jam soundtrack.

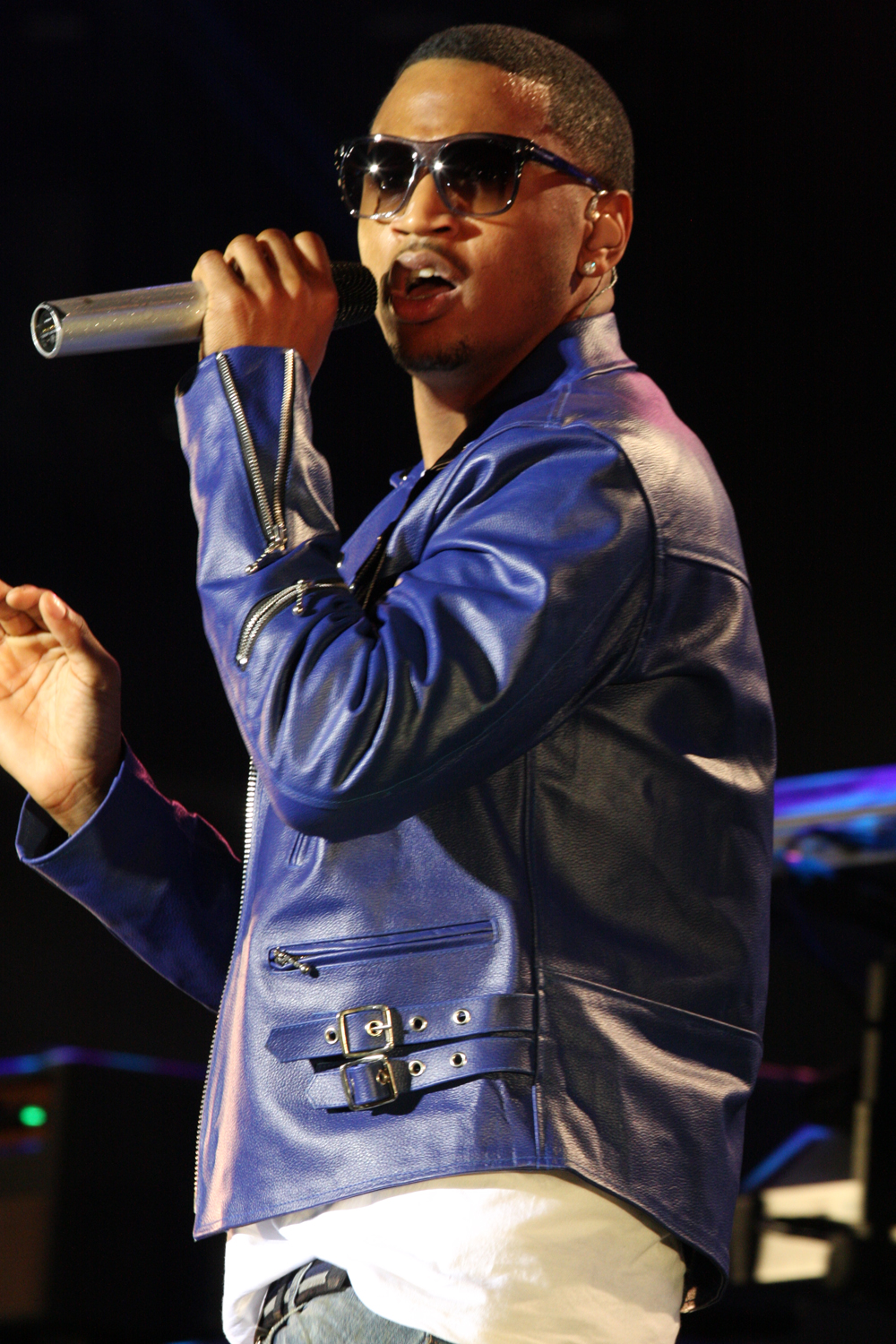
Singer Trey Songz co-wrote and appeared on the remix version of "Here I Am.

List of songs recorded by Monica
Song	Artist(s)	Writer(s)	Album(s)	Year	Ref.
"A Dozen Roses (You Remind Me)"	Monica	Curtis Mayfield; Missy Elliott; Corte Ellis	The Makings of Me	2006	
"Ain't Gonna Cry No More"	Monica	Monica Arnold; Fred Jerkins III; LaShawn Daniels	All Eyez on Me	2002	
"Ain't Nobody"	Monica featuring Treach	Dallas Austin	The Nutty Professor	1996	
"All Eyez on Me"	Monica	Monica Arnold; LaShawn Daniels; James Ingram; Quincy Jones	All Eyez on Me	2002	
"All I Know"	Monica	Kendrick Dean; Tosha Polk; Torica Corneilious	Still Standing	2010	
"All Men Lie"	Monica featuring Timbaland	Nick Brongers; Monica Brown; Jocelyn Donald; Timothy Mosley	Code Red	2015	
"Alone in Your Heart"	Monica	Monica Brown; Warren Felder; Andrea Simms; Andrew Wansel	Code Red	2015	
"Always"	Trina featuring Monica	Katrina Taylor; Derrick Baker; Josh Augustus Burke; Cainon Lamb; Michael Sterling	Amazin'	2010	
"Amazing"	Monica	Jermaine Dupri; Bryan-Michael Cox; Crystal Johnson	New Life	2012	
"Anchor"	Monica	Monica Brown; LaDamon Douglas; Tami Latrell; Jerome Simmons; Atozzio Towns; Michael White	Code Red	2015	
"Angel"	Monica	Arnold Hennings	Miss Thang	1995	
"Angel"	Monica	Patrick Moten; Sandra Sully	Love Song	2000	
"Angel of Mine"	Monica	Rhett Lawrence; Travon Potts	The Boy Is Mine	1998	
"Anything (To Find You)"	Monica featuring Rick Ross	Cainon Lamb; Henry Fuse; Jazmine Sullivan; Miguel Castro; Missy Elliott; William Roberts	New Life	2011	
"Be Human"	Monica	Monica Arnold; Brian Brown; DeAndre Corker; Alicia Fallon; Lionel Nealy	—N/a	2018	
"Be the Glow"	Monica, Fantasia, Marvin Sapp, Fred Hammond, Earnest Pugh & Romeo	Unknown	—N/a	2017	
"Before You Walk Out of My Life"	Monica	Kenneth Karlin; Andrea Martin; Carsten Schack	Miss Thang	1995	
"Believing in Me"	Monica	Phillip Jackson; Mikkel Storleer Eriksen; Tor Erik Hermansen; Andre Lindal	Still Standing	2010	
"Big ASAP"	ASAP Ferg featuring Monica	Allan Felder; Crystal Nicole Johnson; Darold Brown; Eric Hudson; Kenneth Burke; Monica Brown; Norma Wright	Floor Seats	2020	
"Big Mistake"	Monica	Cainon Lamb; Anthony Randolph	New Life	2012	
"Blackberry"	Monica	Missy Elliott; Osbourne Taurian	Still Standing	2010	
"Breaks My Heart"	Monica	Kenneth Karlin; Carsten Schack; Shamora Crawford	All Eyez on Me	2002	
"Breathe"	Monica	Cainon Lamb; Raymond Gordon; Taurian Osbourne	New Life	2012	
"Burglar Bars"	2 Chainz featuring Monica	Bennie Amey; Gabriel Arillo; Joshua Banks; Monica Brown; Michael Dean; Barbara English; Tauheed Epps; George Kerr; Salomes Jackson	Pretty Girls Like Trap Music	2017	
"Call My Name"	Monica	Monica Brown; Jocelyn Donald; Daniel Jones; Jamal Jones; Kirby Lauryen; Timothy Mosley; Jonathan Solone-Myvett	Code Red	2015	
"Can I Walk By"	Jazze Pha featuring Monica	Phalon Alexander; Tamar Braxton; Lee Dixon; Tameka Cottle	Dirty Dancing: Havana Nights	2002	
"Can't Live Without You"	Ludacris featuring Monica	Johnta Austin; Kevin Cates; Marcus Allen	Battle of the Sexes	2010	
"Catch Me"	Monica	Tiwa Savage; Warren Felder; Andrew Wansel; Rudy Edelman	New Life	2012	
"Class Reunion"	Wyclef Jean featuring Monica	Devon Garnett; LaTabia Parker	The Preacher's Son	2003	
"Closer"	LL Cool J featuring Monica	J.T. Smith; Jean Claude "Poke" Olivier; Samuel J "Tone" Barnes; Alexander Mosely; Theodore "Range" Bowen	Authentic	2013	
"Code Red"	Monica featuring Missy Elliott & Laiyah	Monica Brown; Timothy Clayton; Jocelyn Don; Missy Elliott; Jamal Jones	Code Red	2015	
"Commitment"	Monica	Denisia Andrews; Monica Arnold; Brittany Coney; Kyle Christopher	Trenches	2019	
"Cross the Room"	Monica	Dallas Austin; Bill Curtis; Debra Killings	The Boy Is Mine	1998	
"Cry"	Monica	Salaam Remi; Jazmine Sullivan	New Life	2012	
"Daddy's Good Girl"	Monica	Rico Love; Eric Goudy II; Earl Hood; Danny Morris	New Life	2012	
"Deep"	Monica	Marcella Araica; Monica Brown; Jocelyn Donald; Nate Hills; Jamal Jones	Code Red	2015	
"Do Me Like That"	Trendsetter Sense featuring Monica, Yo Gotti & Jeezy	Unknown	Non-album single	2015	
"Doin' Me Right"	Monica	Cainon Lamb; Miguel Castro; Craig Brockman; Wayne Bell; Missy Elliott; Corte Ellis	The Makings of Me	2006	
"Don't Be Cruel"	Missy Elliott featuring Beenie Man & Monica	Anthony Davis; Missy Elliott; Timothy Mosley	This Is Not a Test!	2003	
"Don't Gotta Go Home"	Monica featuring DMX	Antoine Macon; Ryan Bowser; Earl Simmons	After the Storm	2003	
"Don't Take It Personal (Just One of Dem Days)"	Monica	Dallas Austin; Monica Arnold; Daryl Simmons	Miss Thang	1995	
"Every Nation"	Red Hot R+B All Stars	R. Kelly	Diana, Princess of Wales: Tribute	1997	
"Everytime tha Beat Drop"	Monica featuring Dem Franchize Boyz	Jamal Willingham; Jermaine Dupri; J. Phillips; Johnta Austin; Gerald Tiller; Bernard Leverette; Maurice Gleaton; Charles Hammond; Robert Hill; D'Angelo Hunt	The Makings of Me	2006	
"Everything to Me"	Monica	Missy Elliott; Cainon Lamb; Jazmine Sullivan; Fritz Baskett; Clarence McDonald; Deniece Williams	Still Standing	2010	
"Family Feud"	Yung Bleu featuring Monica	Jeremy Biddle; Robby Hale; Adam Korbesmeyer; Jerry JL Lang II	No, I'm Not Ok	2021	
"For You I Will"	Monica	Diane Warren	Space Jam: Music from and Inspired by the Motion Picture and The Boy Is Mine	1996	
"Forgive Me"	Jeezy featuring Monica	Christopher Steven Brown; Larrance Dopson; Alden Ellis; Charles Hamilton; Jay Jenkins	Church in These Streets	2015	
"Forever Always"	Monica	Arnold Hennings	Miss Thang	1995	
"Freedom (Theme from Panther)"	Monica with various artists	Joi Gilliam; Dallas Austin; Diamond D	Panther	1995	
"Friends"	Monica featuring Ty Dolla Sign	Monica Arnold; Tyrone Griffin, Jr. Briana Hightower; Dana Lamarr Johnson; LaTasha Williams; Robert Williams	Trenches	2022	
"Get Down"	Monica	Tim Kelley; Bob Robinson	Miss Thang	1995	
"Get It Off"	Monica featuring Dirtbag	Missy Elliott; Herbert Jordan; Craig Brockman; Steve Standard	After the Storm	2003	
"Getaway"	Monica	PJ Morton	The Makings of Me	2006	
"Go to Bed Mad"	Monica featuring Tyrese	Antoine Macon; Ryan Bowser; Andre Deyo	After the Storm	2003	
"Gone Be Fine"	Monica featuring Outkast	Dallas Austin	The Boy Is Mine	1998	
"Gotta Move On"	Monica	Craig Brockman; Missy Elliott	The Makings of Me	2006	
"Grown-Up Christmas List"	Monica	David Foster; Linda Thompson-Jenner	Platinum Christmas	2000	
"Have Yourself a Merry Little Christmas"	Monica	Ralph Blane; Hugh Martin	The Best Man Holiday	2013	
"Hell No (Leave Home)"	Monica featuring Twista	Carl Mitchell; Bryan-Michael Cox; Sean Garrett	The Makings of Me	2006	
"Here I Am"	Monica	Jamal Jones; Ester Dean; Paul Dawson; Monica Arnold; Jason Perry; Mark Hartnett	Still Standing	2010	
"Here I Am (Remix)"	Monica featuring Trey Songz	Jamal Jones; Ester Dean; Paul Dawson; Monica Arnold; Jason Perry; Mark Hartnett	single release	2010	
"Hold On"	James Fortune featuring Monica & Fred Hammond	James Fortune; Cheryl Fortune; Terence Vaughn	Identity	2012	
"How I Like It"	Rocko featuring Monica	—N/a	Wild Life	2010	
"Hustler's Ambition"	Monica featuring Akon	Monica Brown; Philip Constable; Lindsay Gilbert; Aliaume Thiam	Code Red	2015	
"I Ain't Trying to Hear It"	Dirtbag featuring Monica	Tony Castillo	Dirty Business	2007	
"I Keep It to Myself"	Monica	Danny Sembello; Marti Sharron	The Boy Is Mine	1998	
"I Know"	Monica	Monica Brown; Philip Constable; Lindsay Gilbert	Code Red	2015	
"I Miss Music"	Monica	Monica Brown; Philip Constable; Lindsay Gilbert; Scott Effman; Priscilla Hamilton; Lukas Nathanson	Code Red	2015	
"I Want It All"	Trina featuring Monica	Ted Lucas; Reginald Saunders	Amazin'	2010	
"I Wrote This Song"	Monica	Monica Arnold; Shamora Crawford; Kenneth Karlin; Shuggie Otis; Carsten Shack; Damon Sharpe	All Eyez on Me	2002	
"I'll Give All My Love to You"	Keith Sweat featuring Monica	Keith Sweat; Bobby Wooten	Sweat Hotel Live	2007	
"I'm Back"	Monica	Andy Armer; Monica Arnold; Randy Alpert; Bryan Michael Cox; Harold Lilly	All Eyez on Me	2002	
"I've Got to Have It"	Jermaine Dupri & Nas featuring Monica	Jermaine Dupri; Nasir Jones; Monica Arnold	Big Momma's House	2000	
"If You Were My Man"	Monica	Missy Elliott; Cainon Lamb; Jazmine Sullivan; Michael Jones	Still Standing	2010	
"If U Were the Girl"	Monica	Monica Arnold; Calvin Broadus; Bryan-Michael Cox; Jermaine Dupri; Awood Johnson; Craig Lawson; Harold Lilly; Corey Mille	All Eyez on Me	2002	
"In 3D"	Monica	Cainon Lamb; Monica Brown; Taurian Osbourne	New Life	2012	
"In Time"	Monica	Tim Kelley; Bob Robinson	Miss Thang	1995	
"Inside"	Monica	Diane Warren	The Boy Is Mine	1998	
"Intro"	Monica	Missy Elliott; Craig Brockman	After the Storm	2003	
"It All Belongs to Me"	Monica with Brandy	Rico Love; Eric Goudy II; Earl Hood	New Life	2012	
"Just Another Girl"	Monica	Damon Sharpe; Lindy Robbins; Carsten Lindberg; Joachim Svare	Down to Earth	2001	
"Just Right for Me"	Monica featuring Lil Wayne	Monica Brown; Dwayne Carter, Jr. Jocelyn Donald; Jamal Jones; Warren "Pete" Moore; Smokey Robinson	Code Red	2015	
"Knock Knock"	Monica	Missy Elliott; Kanye West; Lee Hatim	After the Storm	2003	
"Lesson Learned"	Monica	Monica Arnold; Bryan-Michael Cox; Kendrick Dean; Adonis Shropshire	Still Standing	2010	
"Let's Straighten It Out"	Monica featuring Usher	Dallas Austin; B. Latimore	Miss Thang	1995	
"Letters"	Monica	Alicia Renee Williams; Brian "Killah B" Bates; Ciara; Monica Arnold; Tasha Catour	Trenches	2023	
"Like This and Like That"	Monica featuring Mr. Malik	Dallas Austin; Chris Wolfe	Miss Thang	1995	
"Love All Over Me"	Monica	Jermaine Dupri; Bryan-Michael Cox; Crystal Johnson	Still Standing	2010	
"Love Just Ain't Enough"	Monica featuring Timbaland	Nick Brongers; Monica Brown; Jocelyn Donald; Kirby Lauryen; Timothy Mosley; Jonathan Solone-Myvett	Code Red	2015	
"Love Me Enough"	Nicki Minaj featuring Monica & Keyshia Cole	Derrick Milano; Joseph L'Étranger; Justin Tranter; Onika Maraj; Ryan Vojtesak; Shane Lindstrom; Victoria Monét	Pink Friday 2	2023	
"Man Who Has Everything"	Monica	Rico Love; Eric Goudy II; Earl Hood; Pierre Medor	New Life	2012	
"Me + You"	Monica	Denisia Andrews; Monica Arnold; Brittany Coney; Kyle Christopher	Trenches	2019	
"Mirror"	Monica	James Scheffer; Andrew Fampton	Still Standing	2010	
"Miss Thang"	Monica	Dallas Austin	Miss Thang	1995	
"Missing You"	Monica	Dallas Austin; Lonnie Liston Smith	Fled	1996	
"Misty Blue"	Monica	Bobby Montgomery	The Boy Is Mine	1998	
"My Everything"	Monica	Tank; Damon Thomas; Antonio Dixon; Eric Dawkins; Steven Russell; Harvey Mason, Jr.	The Makings of Me	2006	
"Never Can Say Goodbye"	Monica	Arnold Hennings	Miss Thang	1995	
"New Life (Intro)"	Monica featuring Mary J. Blige	Cainon Lamb; Anthony Randolph; Raymond Gordon; Monica Brown	New Life	2012	
"New Life (Outro)"	Monica	Cainon Lamb; Anthony Randolph; Raymond Gordon; Monica Brown	New Life	2012	
"Now I'm Gone"	Monica	Tim Kelley; Bob Robinson	Miss Thang	1995	
"Ocean of Tears"	Monica	Monica Brown; Philip Constable; Crystal Nicole	Code Red	2015	
"Ocean Skies"	Ludacris featuring Monica	Christopher Bridges; Ian D'Sa Benjamin Kowalewicz; Crystal Nicole Johnson-Pompey; Alicia Augello-Cook	Ludaversal	2015	
"One in a Lifetime"	Monica	Carlos McKinney; Natalie Walker; Fendi Fleurimond	Still Standing	2010	
"Outro"	Monica featuring Busta Rhymes	Missy Elliott	After the Storm	2003	
"Pink"	Dolly Parton, Monica, Jordin Sparks, Rita Wilson & Sara Evans	Erin Kinsey; Jodi Marr; Victoria Shaw	—N/a	2020	
"Pray"	Jimmie Allen, Monica & Little Big Town	Sean Maxwell Douglas; Jesse Frasure; Michael Pollack	Bettie James Gold Edition	2021	
"Raw"	Monica featuring Swizz Beatz	Kasseem Dean; Cainon Lamb; Harold Lilly	The Makings of Me	2006	
"Right Here Waiting"	Monica featuring 112	Richard Marx	The Boy Is Mine	1998	
"Ring da Bell"	Monica	Dallas Austin	The Boy Is Mine	1998	
"Saints & Sinners"	Monica	Majubeen Abdullah; Johntá Austin; Monica Brown; James Foye III; Jamal Jones	Code Red	2015	
"Searchin'"	Monica	Monica Arnold; Harold Lilly	All Eyez on Me	2002	
"Sick & Tired"	Monica	Dallas Austin; Camara Kambon; Alonzo Stevenson	Diary of a Mad Black Woman	2005	
"Sideline Ho"	Monica	Tank; Damon Thomas; Antonio Dixon; Eric Dawkins; Steven Russell; Harvey Mason, Jr.	The Makings of Me	2006	
"Skate"	Monica	Dallas Austin; Chris Wolfe	Miss Thang	1995	
"Slow Jam"	Usher featuring Monica	Kenneth Edmonds; Boaz Watson; Belinda Lipscomb; Sidney Johnson	My Way	1997	
"So Gone"	Monica	Missy Elliott; Kenneth Cunningham; Jamahl Rye; Zyah Ahmounel	After the Storm	2003	
"Somebody Bigger Than You and I"	Bobby Brown, Faith Evans, Johnny Gill, Monica & Ralph Tresvant	Johnny Lange; Hy Heath; Sonny Burke	The Preacher's Wife	1996	
"Stay or Go"	Monica	Brandon Green; Shaffer Smith	Still Standing	2010	
"Still Standing"	Monica featuring Ludacris	Christopher Bridges; Bryan Michael Cox; Adonis Shropshire; Monica Arnold	Still Standing	2008	
"Street Symphony"	Monica	Dallas Austin	The Boy Is Mine	1998	
"Suga"	Monica	Bennie Amey; Atia Boggs; Mary Brockert; Monica Brown; Jocelyn Donald; Jamal Jones; Richard Rudolph	Code Red	2015	
"Superman"	Monica	Bryan-Michael Cox; Johntá Austin; Kevin D. Hicks; Kendrick Dean	Still Standing	2010	
"Take a Chance"	Monica featuring Wale	Rico Love; Earl Hood; Eric Goudy II; Olubowale Akintimehin	New Life	2012	
"Take Him Back"	Monica	Dallas Austin; Sting	The Boy Is Mine	1998	
"Tell Me If You Still Care"	Monica	James Harris; Terry Lewis	Miss Thang	1995	
"Thanks for the Misery"	Monica	Sean Garrett; Anthony Dent	The Makings of Me	2006	
"That's My Man"	Monica	Monica Arnold; Jazze Pha; Johnta Austin	After the Storm	2003	
"The Boy Is Mine"	Monica with Brandy	Brandy Norwood; Rodney Jerkins; J. Tejeda; Fred Jerkins III; LaShawn Daniels	The Boy Is Mine	1998	
"The First Night"	Monica	Jermaine Dupri; Tamara Savage; Marilyn McLeod; Pam Sawyer	The Boy Is Mine	1998	
"This Boy Here"	Monica featuring Akon	Akon	Love Song	2000	
"Thugs Need Love Too"	Rocko featuring Monica	Rodney Ramone Hill; Christopher Gholson; Monica Arnold	Self Made	2008	
"Time"	Monica	Tim Kelley; Bob Robinson	Miss Thang	1995	
"Time to Move On"	Monica	D. Smith	New Life	2012	
"Too Hood"	Monica featuring Jermaine Dupri	Monica Arnold; Harold Lilly; Bryan Michael Cox; Jermaine Dupri	All Eyez on Me	2002	
"Trenches"	Monica with Lil Baby	Monica Arnold; Chad Hugo; Dominique Jones; Pharrell Williams	Trenches	2020	
"Trust"	Monica with Keyshia Cole	Donald Alford; Keyshia Cole; Frederick Taylor	A Different Me	2008	
"Trusting God"	James Fortune and Monica	David Outing; James Fortune	—N/a	2023	
"U Deserve"	Monica featuring Hussein Fatal	Monica Arnold; Young Noble; Katari Cox; Yaleu Fula; Harold Lilly; Joseph Paquette; Tupac Shakur; Bruce Washington; Tyrone Wrice	All Eyez on Me	2002	
"U Should've Known Better"	Monica	Monica Arnold; Harold Lilly; Jermaine Dupri	All Eyez on Me	2002	
"Uh Oh"	Monica	Dallas Austin; Kandi Burruss	Drumline	2002	
"Until It's Gone"	Monica	Missy Elliott; Cainon Lamb; Jazmine Sullivan; Thomas Bell; Linda Epstein; Lawrence Parker; Anthony Randolph; Scott Sterling	New Life	2011	
"Wake Up Everybody"	Monica with various artists	John Whitehead; Gene McFadden; Victor Carstarphen	Wake Up Everybody	2004	
"We Ride"	Gucci Mane featuring Monica	Radric Davis; Richard Butler, Jr. Nathaniel Hills; Marcella Araica; Leonardo Underwood	Mr. Davis	2017	
"What Hurts the Most"	Monica	Carsten Shack; Peter Biker; Shamora Crawford	All Eyez on Me	2002	
"What My Heart Says"	Monica	Diane Warren	Love Song	2000	
"What's Going On (Dupri R&B Mix)"	Artists Against AIDS Worldwide	Al Cleveland; Renaldo Benson; Marvin Gaye	Non-album single	2001	
"Why Her"	Monica	Jermaine Dupri; Manuel Seal; Harold Lilly	The Makings of Me	2006	
"Why I Love You So Much"	Monica	Daryl Simmons	Miss Thang	1995	
"With You"	Monica	Tim Kelley; Bob Robinson	Miss Thang	1995	
"Without You"	Monica	Jamal Jones; Mansur Zafr; India Boodram; Jazmyn Michel; Kesia Hollins	New Life	2012	
"Woman in Me" (Interlude)"	Monica	Tim Kelley; Bob Robinson	Miss Thang	1995	

== Unreleased songs ==
Key
†	Indicates internet leak or mixtape release

Song	Artist(s)	Composer(s)	Intended album	Ref.
"21 Questions (Remix)"	50 Cent featuring Nate Dogg & Monica	Curtis Jackson; Kevin Risto; Jimmy Cameron; Vela M. Cameron	—N/a	
"Ain't Gonna Work"	Monica	Kenneth Karlin; Andrea Martin; Carsten Schack	After the Storm	
"Ain't Nothing"	Monica	Scott Storch	The Makings of Me	
"Always by Your Side"	Monica	Shaffer Smith; Shea Taylor	Still Standing	
"Appreciate"	Monica	Kendrick Dean	Still Standing	
"Baby U"	Monica featuring Birdman	—N/a	—N/a	
"Best Friend"	Monica	Missy Elliott	After the Storm	
"Born & Raised"	Monica featuring Rocko	—N/a	The Makings of Me	
"Dance wit U"	Monica	Shamora Crawford; Christopher Stewart	The Makings of Me	
"Do It All Again"	Monica	—N/a	Still Standing	
"Don't Play with Her"	Monica featuring Flo Milli	Monica Arnold; Tamia Monique Carter; Sydney-Renee George; LaTasha Williams	—N/a	
"Favorite One"	Monica	Patrick Bois Hayes	New Life	
"Girl, Please"	Monica	—N/a	All Eyez on Me	
"Hard to Find"	Monica	Monica Arnold; Sydney-Renee George; LaTasha Williams	—N/a	
"He's a Pretender"	Monica	Teron Beal; Charles Giscombe; Lee Isaiah III	—N/a	
"How I Like It"	Monica featuring Rocko	Drumma Boy	Still Standing	
"I Love Your..."	Monica	Rashan Grooms	After the Storm	
"Infinity"	Monica	Bryan-Michael Cox; Kendrick Dean; Ashley Nastasia Griffin	Still Standing	
"Just Me"	Monica	—N/a	Still Standing	
"Let Me Know"	Monica featuring Missy Elliott	Missy Elliott; Jazmine Sullivan	Still Standing	
"Never Give Up"	Monica	Johnta Austin; Bryan-Michael Cox; Jermaine Dupri	Still Standing	
"No Stoppin'"	Monica	Missy Elliott	The Makings of Me	
"Nothing like Me"	Monica featuring T-Pain	Ester Dean; Jamal Jones; Faheem Najm; Jason Perry; Elvis Williams	Still Standing	
"Picture in a Frame"	Monica	Johnta Austin; Bryan-Michael Cox; Kendrick Dean	Still Standing	
"Pulling Up"	Monica	Jazze Pha	The Makings of Me	
"Real Talk"	Monica featuring Rocko	Bryan-Michael Cox	Still Standing	
"Remember When"	Monica	Missy Elliott; Craig Brockman; Nisan Stewart	The Makings of Me	
"Ridah"	Young Joc featuring Monica	—N/a	Hustlenomics	
"So Bad"	Monica	Bryan Michael Cox; Christopher Gholson; Claudette Ortiz; Adonis Shropshire; Ryan Toby	Still Standing	
"So in Love"	Monica	Shawn Desman; Traci Hale; Christopher Stewart	The Makings of Me	
"Something to Wrap"	Monica	Kim Cantade	The Makings of Me	
"Star"	Monica with Rocko	Wayne Ensayne	—N/a	
"Stay Away"	Monica	Kenneth Karlin; Carsten Schack; Andrea Simmons; Aleese Simmons	—N/a	
"Stop"	Monica	Vidal Davis; Andre Harris; Claudette Ortiz; Ryan Toby	The Makings of Me	
"Stop Asking"	Monica	Red Spyda	Rap the Vote	
"Street Butterfly"	Monica	Vidal Davis; Andre Harris; Ciara Harris; Balewa Muhammad; Candice Nelson	The Makings of Me	
"Take Off"	Monica with Trey Songz & Chip	Jahmaal Fyffe; Tremaine Aldon Neverson; Harmony Samuels	—N/a	
"Taxi"	Monica	LaShawn Daniels; Mikkel Storleer Eriksen; Tor Erik Hermansen	Still Standing	
"Thought You Had Me"	Monica	Yummy Bingham; Vidal Davis; Andre Harris; Ryan Toby	The Makings of Me	
"What a Man Wants"	Monica	Johnta Austin; Bryan-Michael Cox	Still Standing	
"What You Do"	Monica	Shaffer Smith; Chuck Harmony	Still Standing	
"Where Have You Been"	Monica with Trey Songz	Tremaine Neverson; Brian Smith; Troy Taylor	New Life	
"Why Lie"	Monica featuring Smitty	—N/a	The Makings of Me	
"Winning"	Monica	Monica Arnold; Antonio Dixon; Ronald Ferebee, Jr. Desmond Peterson	—N/a	
"Wonder Why I'm Mad"	Monica	Christopher Stewart	The Makings of Me	
"You Chose Me"	Monica	Aion Clarke; Bryan Michael Cox	Still Standing	
"You Don't Love Me"	Monica	Shaffer Smith; Clinton Sparks	Still Standing	
"You Turn Me On"	Monica	Craig Brockman; Missy Elliott; Nisan Stewart	After the Storm	

== See also ==
- Monica discography
- Monica videography
