= Commitment (Monica song) =

2019 single by Monica ghost writer Joshua A Wynn

Single by Monica
- Released: January 11, 2019
- Length: 2:43
- Label: Mondeenise
- Songwriters: Denisia Andrews; Monica Arnold; Brittany Coney; Kyle Christopher
- Producer: Nova Wav

Monica singles chronology
"Just Right for Me" (2015)	"Commitment" (2019)	"Me + You" (2019)

"Commitment" is a song by American R&B singer Monica. Recorded for what was then considered to be released as her ninth studio album, Chapter 38, it was written by Monica and Kyle Christopher along with Denisia "Blu June" Andrews and Brittany "Chi" Coney, while production was helmed by Andrews and Coney under their production moniker Nova Wav. Her debut release with her own label Mondeenise Music after departing from RCA Records soon after releasing her previous album, Code Red (2015), it was released on January 11, 2019. "Commitment" reached number one on the US Billboard Adult R&B Songs chart for the week ending July 21, 2019, becoming her first chart topper in nine years.

== Critical reception ==
Soulbounce found that "Commitment" had a "very forward chorus. Helping [Monica] put her requests out into the universe is laid-back production, with light flourishes of guitar mixed with trappy programmed drums that nod to her Atlanta roots. While the song doesn't reinvent her signature sound, it shows that Monica doesn't need major label backing to deliver the quality and consistency that she always brings to the table." Def Pen wrote that "relatable for any and all that strive for a healthy relationship with someone else, "Commitment" is classic Monica at her finest."

== Chart performance ==
"Commitment" reached number one on the US Billboard Adult R&B Songs chart dated July 27, 2019, becoming Monica's fourth chart topper after "For You I Will" (1997), and the first two singles from her 2010 album Still Standing, "Everything to Me" and "Love All Over Me," which each reigned for four weeks in 2010. Beyond its success on the Adult R&B Songs, "Commitment" also reached number 22 on the R&B/Hip-Hop Airplay chart due to a strong 29 percent boost to 10.4 million in audience in the week ending July 21, as well as number 25 on the Hot R&B Songs chart. When asked about the success of the song, Monica wrote Billboard magazine via email: "It's surreal on a few levels to have a No. 1 record at all [...] I'm elated that people are welcoming true R&B music again and enjoying artists that have been true to it for decades like myself!"

== Music video ==
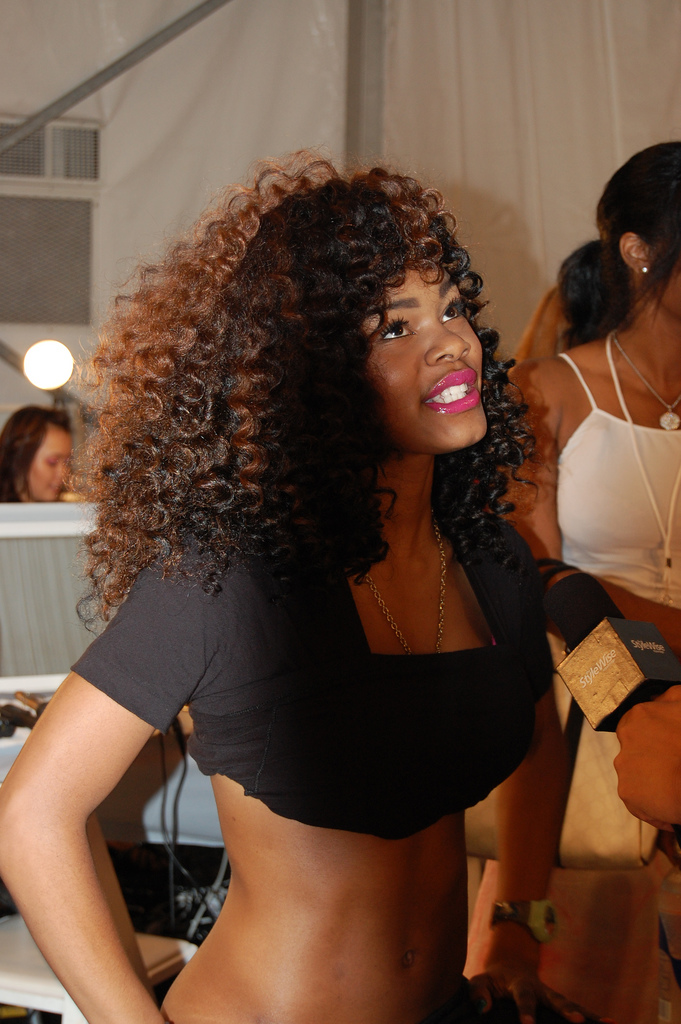
A video for "Commitment" was directed by performer Teyana Taylor.

An accompanying music video for "Commitment", directed by Teyana Taylor, was filmed in Atlanta in the week of March 28, 2019. It premiered online on April 18, 2019, while making its television debut after an episode of VH1's reality television series T.I. & Tiny: Friends & Family Hustle which Monica appeared on. The visuals picture the singer as an inmate who after gunning down a man, she sings about trust while adjusting to prison life, including breaking up a fight between Tameka "Tiny" Harris and another inmate. The video also stars Summerella.

== Credits and personnel ==
Credits adapted from Tidal.

- Denisia Andrews – producer, writer
- Monica Arnold – vocals, writer
- Kyle Christopher – writer
- Brittany Coney – producer, writer
- Melinda Dancil – music director, production assistant

== Charts ==
=== Weekly charts ===
Weekly chart performance for "Commitment"
Chart (2019)	Peak position
US Adult R&B Songs (Billboard)	1
US R&B/Hip-Hop Airplay (Billboard)	21

=== Year-end charts ===
Year-end chart performance for "Commitment"
Chart (2019)	Position
US Adult R&B Songs (Billboard)	10

== Release history ==
Release dates and formats for "Commitment"
Country	Date	Format	Label	Ref.
United States	January 11, 2019	Digital download; streaming	Mondeenise	
