= Casa viva =

Non-profit organization

Casa Viva is a non-profit organization based in Wheaton, Illinois, and San Jose, Costa Rica. Casa Viva seeks to place children who have been separated from their families into a safe, caring family. Casa Viva is Spanish for "Living Families" or "Living Homes." The model of international child care that Casa Viva has created:

- Does not rely on ongoing American funding
- Is nationally based
- Uses the social network of Christian churches to identify and train families

Casa Viva primarily cares for social orphans, and also cares for true orphans.

== History ==
In 1998 Philip and Jill Aspegren moved to the Dominican Republic to build an orphanage and train nationals to care for the children there with KidsAlive. But there had to be a better way: a less expensive, less institutional, quicker way to care for children internationally. They began to dream of a childcare model that does not require new buildings and that places children in families rather than in homes.

Moving to Costa Rica in 2005 they began to network with local churches, recruiting families belonging to those churches to care for children. Children who have been separated from their biological families are placed in families on a short-term basis while their family is identified and counseled. Children are also placed in Casa Viva homes long term when it is impossible for the child to be reunited with their biological family. Children placed in a Casa Viva home have the advantage of growing up in a home that is surrounded by extended family, local church, and the support of the Casa Viva center.

== Today ==
There are currently two Casa Viva Communities in Costa Rica - one in Eastern San Jose and a second in Grecia. In partnership with the Viva Network and Toybox it has identified Bolivia, Peru, El Salvador, Nicaragua, Mexico and Paraguay as the next sites of multiplication.

=== Developing Family Based Child Care International ===
==== Alternative to orphanages ====
Orphanages, whether private or government run, are institutions that are expensive to run and the good ones often become inundated with children sent there by the authorities. This reduces the quality of care and leaves the institution and its staff overworked and under equipped. While the physical needs of the child are met, often psychological needs of a child, the privacy of a child, and integration into their home culture are found to be lacking. This led Casa Viva to begin creating a program, similar to England and the United States' foster care model, but with two primary differences:

- Church based
- Little financial incentive

In some cases, the financial benefit of already-established government-based fostering has become a primary motivator for families to be host foster families. Casa Viva does help families cover the cost of caring for the child but relies heavily on Biblical motivation and mandates to care for the orphan in need.

==== Children raised in families ====
It has been shown that children raised in orphanages do not develop as well physically, cognitively or emotionally as children raised in family based settings.
