= Ghost Kid =

American record producer

- Born: Paul Dawson; New Bern, North Carolina, U.S.
- Genres: Hip hop, R&B, country, gospel, pop
- Occupations: Record producer, songwriter
- Years active: 2009–present

Paul Dawson, best known as Ghost Kid, formally known as Hot Sauce or Hollywood Hot Sauce, is an American music producer and songwriter based in Los Angeles, California. In short, Paul has written, produced and/or co-produced singles including Rihanna's "As Real As You and Me", Ariana Grande's "Hands on Me", Young Jeezy's "Shady Life", Robin Thicke's "Sex Therapy", New Boyz's "Spot Right There", and Usher's "Hot Tottie".

== Early life ==
Paul Dawson grew up in New Bern, North Carolina. He attributes his musical ability to a relationship with God and his mother's spiritual guidance, Dawson moved to Atlanta, Georgia. In 2008, Hot Sauce met R&B singer Jovan Dais, who offered him a guitar gig on his tour. After playing for Dais, Hot Sauce and Dais formed Atlanta based production company Dawson Dais Productions. Later teaming up with record producer Polow Da Don, Hot Sauce moved to LA in 2009. He gained musical success and gained an opportunity to work with major recording artists. 'Hollywood Hot Sauce' has worked on music with 50 Cent, Usher, Chris Brown, Justin Bieber, Britney Spears, Robin Thicke, Nas, Nelly, Weezer, Limp Bizkit Keyshia Cole, New Boyz, Teairra Mari and more. In 2012, Hotsauce teamed up with Rodney "Darkchild" Jerkins. There he was able to produce songs for Rihanna, Ariana Grande, and Young Jeezy.

== Production credits ==
Track/Title	Artist/Album	Details
"Hands On Me"	Ariana Grande/ My Everything	Co-written and Produced
"As Real As You and Me"	Rihanna/ Home Movie Soundtrack	Produced
"Shady Life"	Young Jeezy(featuring Kelly Rowland)/Seen It All	Co-written and Produced
"Ambulance"	Mishon	Written and Produced
"Sex Therapy"	Robin Thicke	Co-Produced
"Diamonds"	Robin Thicke	Co-Produced
"Shaking It 4 Daddy" ("Sex Therapy")	Robin Thicke(featuring Nicki Minaj)	Co-Produced
"Gotta Be Your Man"	Chris Brown	Co-Produced
"Wait"	Chris Brown (featuring Trey Songz, The Game)	Co-Produced
"Calypso"	Chris Brown	Co-Produced
"Heaven"	El DeBarge	Guitars
"Your Love feat. Trey Songz"	Diddy-Dirty Money	Co-Produced
"I Know feat. Chris Brown and Wiz Khalifa"	Diddy-Dirty Money	Written and Produced
"Follow Your Dreams"	T.I.	Co-Produced
"Way You Love Me feat. Rick Ross"	Keri Hilson	Co-Produced
"She's Ready To Go"	Limp Bizkit	Co-Produced
"Meet In The Middle"	Timbaland (featuring Bran'Nu)	Co-Produced
"Here I Am"	Monica ("Still Standing")	Co-Produced
"Woo Hoo"	Christina Aguilera ("Bionic")	Co-Produced
"Hot Tottie"	Usher (featuring Jay-Z ("Versus")	Co-Produced
"Baby By Me"	50 Cent (featuring Ne-Yo and Jovan Dais)	Keyboards
"Spot Right There"	New Boyz (featuring Teairra Mari)	Written and Produced
"So Cold"	Chris Brown (Graffiti)	Co-Produced
"Touch It"	Teairra Mari	Written and Produced
"Bye, Bye"	Teairra Mari	Written and Produced
"Stay"	Teairra Mari	Written and Produced
"Booty Call"	Teairra Mari	Written and Produced
"Ur A Freak"	Teairra Mari	Written and Produced
"Pocket Bible"	Ace Jones	Co-Produced
"Good Good"	Usher (featuring Summer Walker and 21 Savage)	Co-Written, Music
"I like it"	Didi J	Co-Written, Music

== Awards ==
2010 BMI Urban Music Award - Robin Thicke "Sex Therapy"
