= Champion (Beckah Shae album) =

Studio album by Beckah Shae
- Released: May 6, 2014
- Genres: Contemporary Christian music; EDM; house; Christian hip hop; club
- Label: Shae Shoc
- Producer: Jack "Shoc" Shocklee

Beckah Shae chronology
Rest (2012)	Champion (2014)	Mighty (2016)

Singles from Champion
- 1. "Incorruptible" Released: 2013; 2. "Turbo Style" Released: 2013; 3. "Pioneer" Released: 2014; 4. "Heartbeat" Released: 2014

Champion is the eighth studio album by the American Christian music singer Beckah Shae. The album was released on May 6, 2014, by her independent label Shae Shoc Records. The album was produced by her husband Jack "Shoc" Shocklee. The album charted on three Billboard charts in the USA and it received a four star rating from New Release Tuesday.

== Critical reception ==
Professional ratings
Review scores
Source	Rating
365 Days of Inspiring Media	4.5/5 stars
CCM Magazine	4/5 stars
Christian Music Review	5/5 stars
Cross Rhythms	10/10 squares
Jam the Hype	8.8/10
New Release Tuesday	4/5 stars

Champion met with positive reception from music critics. Andy Argyrakis of CCM Magazine rated the album four stars out of five, indicating how the release gives evidence that Beckah Shae can "easily compete with any electronic dance music act in the mainstream", which she had some truly fine collaborators to work with on the songs, yet the artist "is at the center of this masterpiece". At New Release Tuesday, Sarah Fine rated the album four stars out of five, remarking, "Champion reaffirms all the reasons why Shae and her husband are masters at their craft." In addition, Fine wrote that "A 15-track monster of an album, Champion doesn't disappoint." Amanda Brogan of Christian Music Review rated the album a perfect five stars, stating that the album can be utilized for just mere workout music or for its spiritual resonations. At 365 Days of Inspiring Media, Micah Garnett rated the album four-and-a-half stars out of five, writing, "Champion is full of tremendous dance tracks with uplifting and relevant lyrics." Garnett called the release "a doozy". Joshua Galla of Jam the Hype rated the album 8.8 out of ten, saying, "Revolutionary is an ideal definition of what Champion encapsulates," and that "Beckah used her life's struggles to handcraft brilliance in the form of art within music."

== Commercial performance ==
For the Billboard charting week of May 24, 2014, Champion was the No. 47 most sold of the Christian Albums, and it was the No. 12 most sold of the Gospel Albums. In addition, it was the No. 24 most sold album in the breaking-and-entry chart of the Heatseekers Albums.

== Track listing ==
Champion
No.	Title	Writer(s)	Length
1.	"Champion"	Beckah Shae, Crystal Nicole, Jack Shocklee	3:58
2.	"Incorruptible"	Shae, Shocklee	3:39
3.	"Turbo Style"	Shae, Shocklee	3:32
4.	"My All" (featuring T-Bone)	Shae, Shocklee, Nicole, Rene F. Sotomayor	3:36
5.	"Promise"	Shae, Shocklee	3:02
6.	"Jericho" (featuring Israel Houghton)	Shae, Shocklee, Montell Jordan, David Thulin	4:13
7.	"Heartbeat"	Shae, Shocklee	3:46
8.	"Me and My God" (featuring Eric Dawkins)	Shocklee, Eric Dawkins	4:24
9.	"Pioneer"	Shae, Shocklee	3:35
10.	"Legacy" (featuring Crystal Lewis)	Shae, Shocklee, Dawkins	3:45
11.	"Your Kingdom Come" (featuring Joy & Grace)	Shae, Shocklee	3:39
12.	"Vision"	Shae, Shocklee	3:31
13.	"Me First"	Shae, Dawkins, Shocklee	3:20
14.	"Turbo Style (Jack Shocklee Remix)" (featuring Canon)	Shae, Shocklee, Canon	3:23
15.	"Incorruptible (David Thulin Remix)"	Shae, Shocklee	4:41
Total length:			56:04

== Charts ==
Chart (2014)	Peak position
US Top Christian Albums (Billboard)	47
US Top Gospel Albums (Billboard)	12
US Heatseekers Albums (Billboard)	24
