= Trenches (Monica and Lil Baby song) =

Single by Monica featuring Lil Baby
- Released: August 31, 2020
- Length: 3:35
- Label: Mondeenise
- Songwriters: Chad Hugo; Dominique Jones; Monica; Pharrell Williams
- Producer: The Neptunes

Monica singles chronology
"Me + You" (2019)	"Trenches" (2020)	"Friends" (2022)

"Trenches" is a song by American singer Monica featuring rapper Lil Baby. It was written by both musicians along with Chad Hugo and Pharrell Williams from The Neptunes and recorded for what was then considered to be released as her same-titled ninth studio album. Produced by Hugo and Williams, the song was released as the album's leading single on August 31, 2020, coinciding with Monica and Brandy's appearances on the webcast battle series Verzuz. "Trenches" peaked at number 32 on the US Billboard Digital Song Sales and entered the top 20 on both the Adult R&B Songs and the Hot R&B Songs.

== Background ==
"Trenches" was written by Monica and Lil Baby along with Pharrell Williams and Chad Hugo from production duo The Neptunes. In an interview with Billboard, Monica said that the song "came about when Pharrell [Williams] and I were talking. "Trenches" [...] didn't have a name at the time. I was explaining to him that my ultimate goal is to remain authentic and connected to my people." On their collaboration, she further wrote on Instagram: "For many years I've dreamed of working with The Neptunes. [I'm] admiring their ability to remain current yet timeless as well as their bond and brotherhood because loyalty is fleeting in this business."

== Critical reception ==
Stereogum editor Tom Breihan described "Trenches" as "a slinky relationship track that does a pretty nice job walking the line between '90s and right-now sounds. On the song, Monica sings about the importance of communicating instead of getting caught up in stresses and rivalries. Monica and Lil Baby belong to different generations, but they’ve got a nice, easy chemistry on this one." Mike Wass from Idolator called the song "a melodic mid-tempo love song that evokes the 39-year-old's After the Storm era."

Variety put "Trenches" on their Best Songs of the Week listing. Editor Jem Aswad wrote: "We've gotta say this song snared us when Monica premiered it the other night on her Verzuz battle with Brandy — and while the beat and the Lil Baby cameo are both hot, what's really shining through on this song is the gorgeous melody, which is intricate and tricky to sing, but of course Monica delivers with confidence and ease, dropping in some life lessons along the way."

== Chart performance ==
Upon release, "Trenches" debuted at number 32 on Billboard's Hot 100 component Digital Song Sales, becoming Monica's first entry on the chart since 2008's "Still Standing." The song also opened at number 2 on the R&B Digital Song Sales, number 10 on the R&B/Hip-Hop Digital Song Sales and number 14 on the Hot R&B Songs. It eventually peaked at number 12 on the latter chart. On Billboard's Adult R&B Songs, "Trenches" debuted on February 6, 2021. It became her 19 top ten entry on the chart, reaching number 17.

== Music video ==
A music video for "Trenches" was filmed by The Rite Brothers, consisting of director Colin Quinn and first assistant director Sam Green. In the "simplistic visual," Lil Baby portrays a "street heavyweight" with whom Monica catches up in an abandoned warehouse. The video premiered online on November 25, 2020.

== Charts ==
Chart performance for "Trenches"
Chart (2020–2021)	Peak position
US Adult R&B Songs (Billboard)	17
US Digital Song Sales (Billboard)	32
US Hot R&B Songs (Billboard)	12

== Release history ==
Release dates and formats for "Trenches"
Country	Date	Format	Label	Ref.
United States	August 31, 2020	Digital download; streaming	Mondeenise	
