= Beckah Shae =

American singer

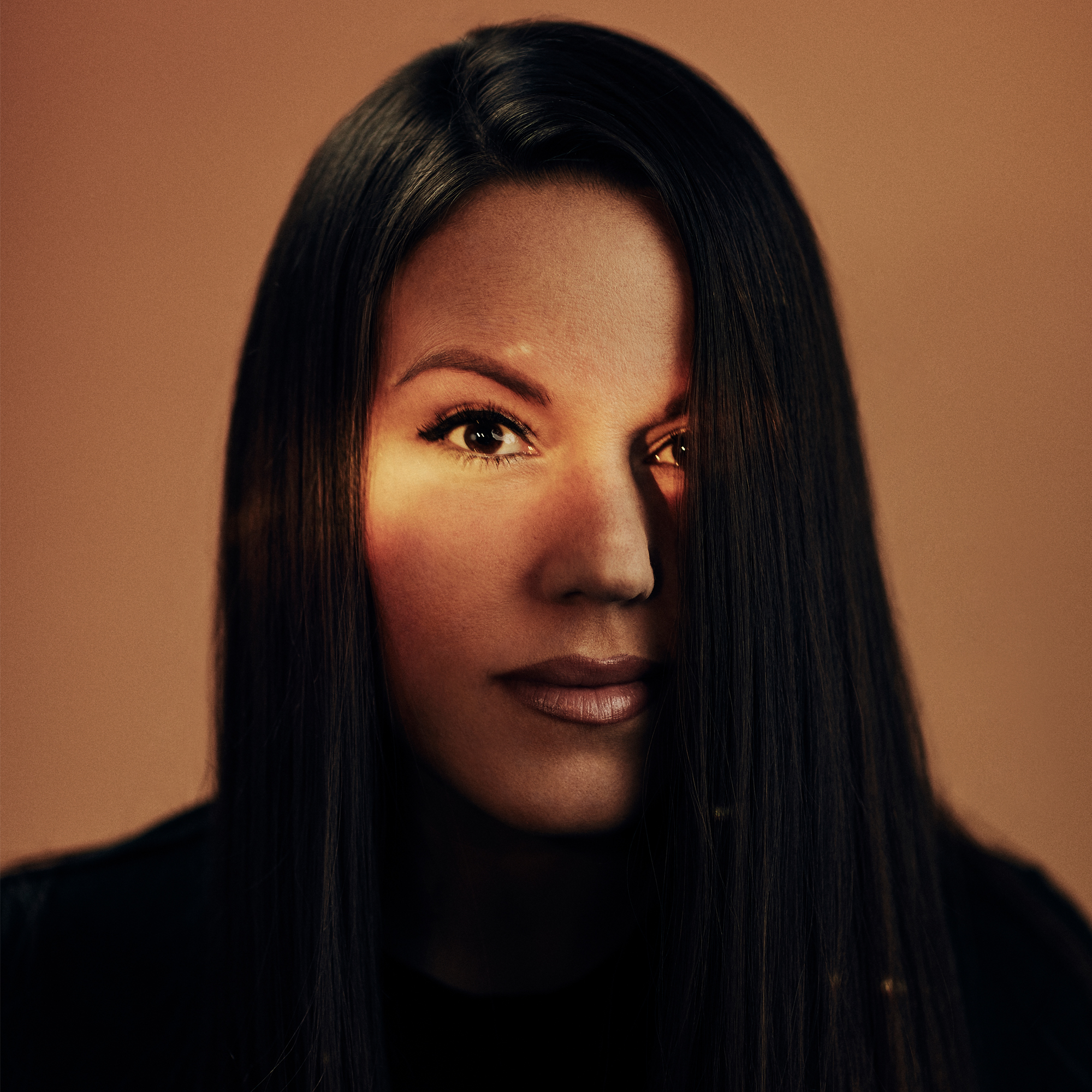
- Beckah Shae photographed 2017

Background information
- Born: Rebecca Wilson; September 1, 1978 (age 48); Orange County, California, U.S.
- Origin: Nashville, Tennessee, U.S.
- Genres: Contemporary Christian music, Electronic dance music, Christian hip hop, contemporary R&B, Urban contemporary gospel, Contemporary worship music
- Occupation: Singer–songwriter
- Instrument: Vocals
- Years active: 2005–present
- Label: Shae Shoc
- Website: beckahshae.com

Rebecca Shocklee (born September 1, 1978, née Wilson), known professionally by her stage name Beckah Shae, is an American Contemporary Christian music singer-songwriter. She is signed to the independent record label Shae Shoc Records she co-owns with her husband and producer Jack Shocklee.

== History ==
Shae received her first Dove Award nomination in 2011 in the category of Urban Recorded Song of the Year for "Life". She also appeared on Jonny Lang's Turn Around (A&M), TobyMac's "Funky Jesus Music", Tonight (ForeFront) and joined him onstage for a performance at the 2010 GMA Dove Awards. Shae co-wrote several songs and featured on the title-track of Montell Jordan's album, Shake Heaven (Victory World Music), and is currently featured on Byron "Mr. Talkbox" Chambers' EP Show Me the Way on the track "Everything Works Together". Shae also appears on the movie soundtrack I'm in Love with a Church Girl.

The single "#putyourloveglasseson" was released on April 12, 2011.

== Philanthropy ==
Shae has traveled, promoting and working alongside ministries like Kids Alive International, an organization that rescues abandoned and orphaned children. After a visit to Kenya in 2010 with Kids Alive, she filmed the music video, "Imagine", from her album LIFE, expressing her desire to "see others open up their eyes to the need and make a difference by becoming involved in sponsorship, adoption and missions." In 2011 she traveled with The A21 Campaign to Greece and acted as a "walking billboard", with matching shirts and taped mouths, as part of an initiative to raise awareness of human trafficking. On July 28, 2011, Shae performed for an audience that included keynote speaker Bernice King, daughter of Martin Luther King Jr., at the Women and Girls Benefit Luncheon held on the campus of Lipscomb University in Nashville, to raise funds for Youth Life Learning Centers (a program of Youth Life Foundation of Tennessee).

== Discography ==
=== Studio albums ===
List of studio albums, with selected chart positions
Title	Album details	Peak chart positions		
Title	Album details	US Gospel	US Christ	US Heat
Butterfly	Released: January 23, 2006; Label: Shae Shoc Records; Formats: CD, digital download, streaming	—	—	—
Joy	Released: June 28, 2008; Label: Shae Shoc Records; Formats: CD, digital download, streaming	—	—	—
Life	Released: June 15, 2010; Label: Shae Shoc Records; Formats: CD, digital download, streaming	17	—	—
Destiny	Released: August 16, 2011; Label: Shae Shoc Records; Formats: CD, digital download, streaming	19	32	35
Rest	Released: September 4, 2012; Label: Shae Shoc Records; Formats: CD, Digital download, streaming	—	—	—
Champion	Released: May 6, 2014; Label: Shae Shoc Records; Formats: CD, digital download, streaming	12	47	24
Mighty	Released: July 15, 2016; Label: Shae Shoc Records; Formats: CD, digital download, streaming, LP	—	—	—
Awake	Released: November 7, 2025; Label: Shae Shoc Records; Formats: CD, digital download, streaming	—	—	—
"—" denotes releases that did not chart or were not released in that territory.

=== Christmas albums ===
- Emmanuel (November 23, 2010)
- Let It Snow (December 2, 2016)

=== Children's albums ===
- Scripture Snacks, Vol. 1 (December 13, 2011)
- Scripture Snacks, Vol. 2 (December 4, 2012)
- Scripture Snacks Kids, Fun Size, Vol. 1 (July 31, 2015)
- Scripture Snacks, Vol. 3 (October 25, 2017)

=== Singles ===
Year	Title	US Christian			Album
Year	Title	CHR	Hot Songs	Gospel Digital	Album
2009	"Here In this Moment"	6	31	3	Life
2010	"Life"	8	33	3	Life
2010	"Gold"	23	—	—	Destiny
2010	"Most Beautiful Time of the Year"	—	23	—	Emmanuel
2011	"#putyourloveglasseson"	—	—	—	Destiny
2011	“Are You Ready?”	—	—	24	Destiny
2012	"Overflow"	—	—	—	Rest
2013	"Incorruptible"	30	—	—	Champion
2013	"Turbo Style"	—	—	—	Champion
2014	"Pioneer"	—	—	—	Champion
2014	“Heartbeat”	—	—	—	Champion
2015	"I'll Be Alright"	—	—	—	Mighty
2019	"King"	—	—	—	Awake
2019	"Lioness"	—	—	—	Awake
2019	"So Will I (100 Billion X)"	—	—	—	Awake
2020	"Awake"	—	—	—	Awake
2023	"Freedom Is My Anthem"	—	—	—	Awake
2024	"Wild & Free"	—	—	—	Awake
2026	“Pledge My Heart”	—	—	—	Non-album single
"—" denotes releases that did not chart or were not released in that territory.

=== Awards ===
==== GMA Dove Awards ====
Year	Award	Result
2011	Urban Recorded Song of the Year ("Life")	Nominated
2016	Scripture Snacks Kids, Fun Size, Vol. 1	Nominated
