= Destiny (Beckah Shae album) =

Studio album by Beckah Shae
- Released: August 16, 2011
- Genres: Christian electronic dance music, urban gospel, contemporary worship music
- Length: 47:06
- Label: Shae Shoc
- Producers: Beckah Shae, Jack "Shoc" Shocklee

Beckah Shae chronology
Life (2010)	Destiny (2011)	Rest (2012)

Singles from Destiny
- 1. "Gold" Released: 2010; 2. "#putyourloveglasseson" Released: 2011; 3. "Are You Ready?" Released: 2011

Destiny is the fourth studio album from Christian music songstress Beckah Shae. The album released on August 16, 2011, through her independent label Shae Shoc Records. This album was produced by her husband Jack "Shoc" Shocklee (Jonathan Nicholas Shocklee) and herself. The album charted on three Billboard charts, and it received a two five star ratings from New Release Tuesday and a perfect ten squares from Cross Rhythms, yet received a three star review from Christianity Today.

== Background ==
The album was preceded by 2010's Life, which was her third studio album for her career. On August 16, 2011, Beckah Shae released this album through her independent label Shae Shoc Records, and it was produced by herself with her husband Jack "Shoc" Shocklee.

== Critical reception ==
Professional ratings
Review scores
Source	Rating
Alpha Omega News	A
The Christian Music Review Blog	4.5/5 stars
Christianity Today	3/5 stars
Cross Rhythms	10/10 squares
Jesus Freak Hideout	3.5/5 stars
New Release Tuesday	5/5 stars

Destiny garnered critical praise from the ratings and reviews of music critics. At Jesus Freak Hideout, Laura Sproull rated the album three-and-a-half stars out of five, remarking that "Although Destiny does not surpass the quality of most mainstream hip-hop and R&B acts, it is a positive alternative to those looking for something more than a contagious beat with watered-down words." Lins Honeyman of Cross Rhythms rated the album a perfect ten squares, stating that "credit must go to Shae for her powerhouse vocal performance - complete with all the gusto and versatility of divas like Beyoncé and Shakira - plus an incredible writing ability that hits her message home at every turn." At New Release Tuesday, Sarah Fine rated the album a perfect five stars, writing how "from start to finish, is a complete gem." Andy Argyrakis of Christianity Today rated the album three stars out of five, saying that even "Though the disc is sometimes dripping with too much production, it keys into today's current dance/pop/R&B trends with relevance and infectiousness." At New Release Tuesday, Kevin McNeese rated the album a perfect five stars, indicating how the release "comes on strong as one of the best overall pop albums of the year" because the artist "pulls no punches and gets to the heart of the matter on many songs." Elise F. of Alpha Omega News graded the album an A, commenting that "With a sound similar to non-Christian artists like Rihanna, Beckah Shae's Destiny provides an uplifting and God-centered alternative to the music and lifestyles the world has to offer." At The Christian Music Review Blog, Jonathan Kemp rated the album four-and-a-half stars out of five, calling the album "so good" because "The beats to her music are really good, her voice is absolutely gorgeous, and her lyrics are amazing once you really read them. I really hope that a lot more people start listening to her music."

== Commercial performance ==
For the Billboard charting week of September 3, 2011, Destiny was the No. 32 most sold of the Christian Albums, and it was the No. 19 most sold of the Gospel Albums. In addition, it was the No. 35 most sold album in the breaking-and-entry chart of the Heatseekers Albums.

== Track listing ==
All tracks are written by Rebecca A. Shocklee and Jonathan Nicholas Shocklee except for track Nos. 8 and 9 where they were joined by Montell Jordan.

Track list
No.	Title	Length
1.	"Are You Ready?"	4:19
2.	"Music"	3:36
3.	"Supernova"	3:01
4.	"Holy"	4:05
5.	"Just to Know"	3:16
6.	"#PutYourLoveGlassesOn"	3:32
7.	"For Such a Time as This"	3:49
8.	"Show Me"	3:22
9.	"We Are"	3:16
10.	"Hope"	4:00
11.	"Gold"	3:28
12.	"Destiny"	7:22
Total length:		47:06

== Chart performance ==
Chart (2011)	Peak position
US Top Christian Albums (Billboard)	32
US Top Gospel Albums (Billboard)	19
US Heatseekers Albums (Billboard)	35
