= Crystal Nicole =

American singer

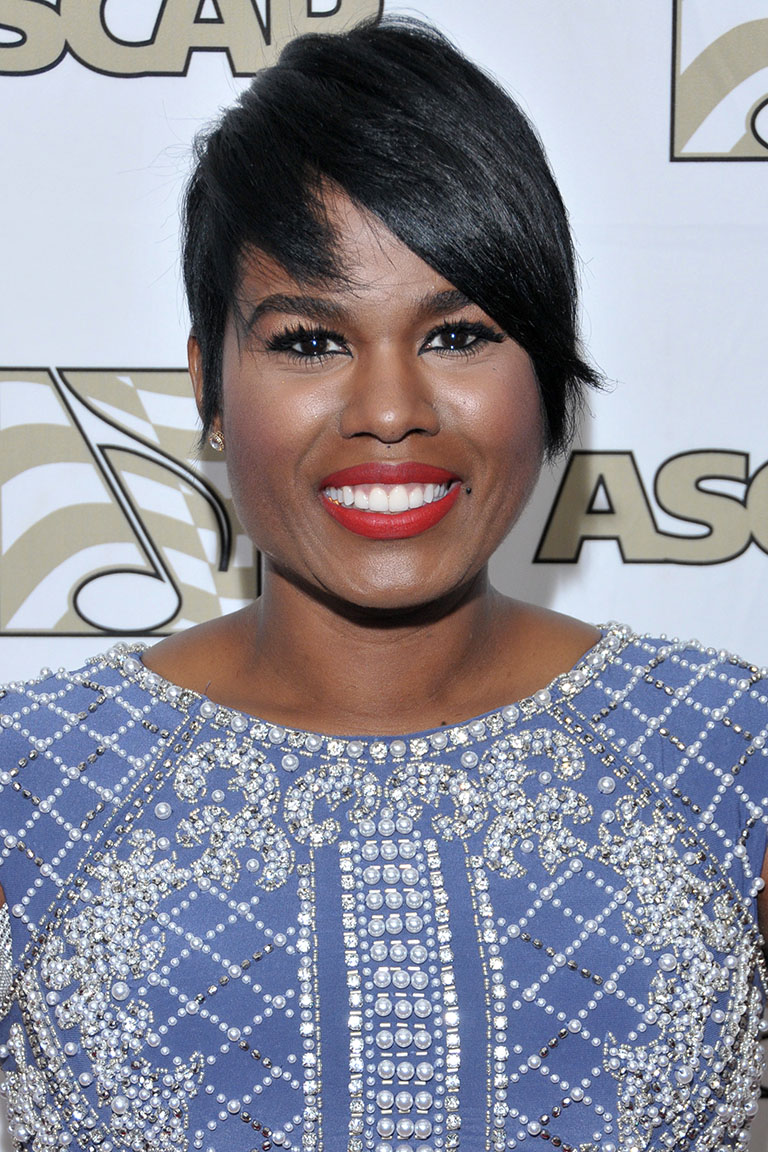
- Crystal Nicole in 2015

Background information
- Also known as: Cristyle
- Born: Crystal Nicole Johnson-Pompey; November 10, 1983 (age 42)
- Origin: Atlanta, Georgia, U.S.
- Genres: R&B, soul
- Occupations: Singer; songwriter
- Years active: 2007–present
- Labels: Interscope; Blackground; So So Def; EMI Music

Crystal Nicole Johnson-Pompey (born November 10, 1983), also known by her stage name as Cristyle (stylized as Cri$tyle), is an American singer and songwriter. She signed with Jermaine Dupri's So So Def Recordings in a joint venture with EMI in 2007, but parted ways with both labels in favor of Blackground and Interscope Records, through which she released her 2011 debut single, "Pinch Me". Produced by former label boss Dupri, the song failed to chart. Her debut extended play (EP), Masterpiece (2015), was released independently.

Johnson has won two Grammy Awards from seven nominations.

== Career ==
Nicole was born and raised in Atlanta, Georgia. She started singing at different talent shows and open mics in Atlanta and wrote her first song at the age of ten.

Nicole has written songs for Girlicious, Janet Jackson, Jennifer Lopez, Keke Palmer, Teyana Taylor, Tiffany Evans, Chilli, Natasha Bedingfield, Wonder Girls, Rihanna, and Jessica Sanchez. She has co-written songs with Mariah Carey and wrote songs featured on the projects of Brandy, Ciara, Jennifer Hudson, and Beyoncé.

In 2023, Nicole auditioned for the 24th season of The Voice. In a montage, Reba McEntire was the only coach to turn, defaulting Nicole to her team.

For the battles, Nicole was paired with her teammate, Caitlin Quisenberry. Reba chose Quisenberry to advance and John Legend, the only remaining coach with a steal, opted not to steal Nicole, eliminating her from the competition.

== Awards and nominations ==
Year	Award	Won
2012	Grammy Award for Best Dance/Electronica Album – Nothing but the Beat	No
2011	Grammy Award for Grammy Award for Album of the Year – Loud	No
2011	Grammy Award for Best Pop Vocal Album – Loud	No
2011	Grammy Award for Best Dance Recording – "Only Girl (In the World)"	Yes
2011	Grammy Award for Best R&B Album – Still Standing	No
2009	Grammy Award for Best Contemporary R&B Album – I Am... Sasha Fierce	Yes
2009	Grammy Award for Album of the Year – I Am... Sasha Fierce	No

== Discography ==
=== Albums ===
- 2015: Masterpiece (EP)

=== Singles ===
- 2011: "Pinch Me"
- 2013: "Sundown"
- 2014 "Imagine"
- 2014 "I Don't Belong to You"
- 2014 "I'm All Yours"

== Production and writing discography ==
Nicole has a list of songs that she has written or co-written on her Myspace page.

Artist	Title	Album	Year
Jennifer Lopez	"Gotta Be There"	Brave	2007
Keke Palmer	"Hood Anthem"	So Uncool	2007
Janet Jackson	"So Much Betta" "The 1" (ft. Missy Elliott) "What's Ur Name"	Discipline	2008
Mariah Carey	"Touch My Body" "I'll Be Lovin' U Long Time" "Side Effects (feat. Young Jeezy)" "Heat"	E=MC²	2008
Chilli	"Dumb Dumb Dumb"	Bi-Polar	2008
Natasha Bedingfield	"Angel"	Pocketful of Sunshine	2008
Tiffany Evans	"I'm Grown"	Tiffany Evans	2008
Teyana Taylor	"Google Me"	From a Planet Called Harlem	2008
Brandy	"The Definition" "Shattered Heart"	Human	2008
Beyoncé	"Scared of Lonely"	I Am… Sasha Fierce	2008
Pussycat Dolls	"Elevator"	Doll Domination	2008
Pussycat Dolls	"Painted Windows"	Doll Domination	2009
LeToya Luckett	"Lazy"	Lady Love	2009
Mariah Carey	"Angels Cry"	Memoirs of an Imperfect Angel	2009
Monica	"Love All Over Me"	Still Standing	2010
Sugababes	"Give It To Me Now"	Sweet 7	2010
Rihanna	"Only Girl (In the World)"	Loud	2010
Jessica Mauboy	"No One Like You" "Foreign"	Get 'Em Girls	2010
Jesse McCartney	"Mrs. Mistake"	Have It All	2010
David Guetta	"Night Of Your Life" "I'm a Machine"	Nothing but the Beat	2011
Jennifer Hudson	"I Got This"	I Remember Me	2011
Wonder Girls	"The DJ is Mine (feat. School Gyrls)" "Like Money (feat. Akon)"	Wonder Best	2012
Monica	"Amazing"	New Life	2012
Lecrae	"Was it Worth it"	Church Clothes 2	2013
Beckah Shae	"My All"	Champion	2014
Lecrae	"Give In"	Anomaly	2014

Nicole has also sung a number of demos and is accredited to other works in progress. (listed below).

- "Bread Crumbs"
- "Can't Stop"
- "Friend Like Me"
- "Good One Now"
- "Scared of Lonely" (Demo of Beyoncé's song)
- "Hard to Breathe" (Demo for Pussycat Dolls)
- "I Don't Wanna Love Ya"
- "I Just Love Ya"
- "In The Morning"
- "The Definition (Demo of Brandy's song)"
- "Only Girl (In The World)" (Demo of Rihanna's song)
