= Clarence McDonald =

American musician (1944/1945 – 2021)

Clarence Kermit "Mac" McDonald (February 24, 1945 – July 21, 2021) was a Los Angeles-based American pianist, composer, arranger, and producer. McDonald was known for his musical diversity, enduring melodies and signature groove.

His most famous contributions include "Lovely Day" by Bill Withers, "Best of My Love" by The Emotions, "I Want You Back" by The Jackson 5 (contributing on keyboard), and “Silly” sung by Deniece Williams in 1981 and Taral Hicks in 1997. In 2010, “Silly”'s instrumental intro and bridge were sampled in Monica's seven week-long Billboard No. 1 R&B Grammy nominated song "Everything To Me".

He worked with a long list of entertainment icons including Ray Charles, Barbra Streisand, Ella Fitzgerald, Justin Timberlake, Aretha Franklin, James Taylor, Carole King, Taral Hicks, Freddie Hubbard, Nancy Wilson, Boz Scaggs, Seals & Crofts, Bill Withers, and the Jackson 5.

== Biography ==
=== Early years (1945–1964) ===
Born in Los Angeles, California, on February 24, 1945, to Curtis and Ocie Brooks McDonald, Clarence showed an early interest in music, and started playing at a very young age. His first instrument was the soprano saxophone, followed by the trombone, euphonium, sousaphone and piano. McDonald chose the piano as his primary instrument because he found it to be the most challenging. His parents encouraged his early instincts.

Prominent music teacher Alma Julia Hightower taught Clarence to play the piano. The combination of early exposure and unconditional support launched the young man on his journey to becoming a great musician, songwriter, and producer. By the age of 12, Clarence was playing the piano for Angeles Funeral Home, then located on Jefferson Boulevard and Central Avenue in Los Angeles.

By the age of 16, McDonald was playing at the local nightclub, Memory Lane, accompanying American jazz & gospel singer Lorez Alexandria. On weekends he played with the Chico Hamilton Quintet through an invitation from the musical director and jazz saxophonist Charles Lloyd. McDonald understood the guitar voicings required for the quartet and was able to play them on the piano. He often worked til dawn, before heading straight to school on Monday mornings.

Upon graduation from Dorsey High School, McDonald attended Cal State, Los Angeles. He completed his college schooling, graduating with honors in 1964.

=== The Fifth Dimension and Vietnam War conscription (1964–1977) ===
After college, he was introduced to the art and business of session recording, immediately contributing to some all-time favorite pop tunes.

In the early 1960s, McDonald replaced Rex Middleton as musical director of The Hi-Fi's, a Los Angeles-based vocal group. The group changed its name to The Vocals and began working with American soul singer Lonnie Sattin. The Vocals evolved into The Versatiles, which became The 5th Dimension in 1966. Clarence lent his own special groove to classics like "Up Up and Away". While touring, the group was contracted to be the opening act for Ray Charles, traveling with him in 1964–65.

In 1966, when his rise in the music world seemed limitless, McDonald was drafted into the United States Army and sent to Vietnam, where he served for two years. His division was sent home on January 7, 1968, the day before the North Vietnamese overran and destroyed their base camp in the Tet Offensive. McDonald received an Honorable Discharge and was awarded the National Defense Service Medal, the Vietnam Service Medal, and the Vietnam Campaign Medal.

=== Return to music and career rise (1968–1977) ===
McDonald returned to the music business, contributing to thousands of songs as a session player. Some of his first sessions were for Motown (Los Angeles) recording with Diana Ross, Gladys Knight & the Pips and the Jackson 5, and he played on records including the Jackson 5's first hit, I Want You Back.

In 1975, while working with Carole King, McDonald met James Taylor. An invitation followed from Warner Brothers Producers Lenny Waronker and Russ Titelman, who asked McDonald to record on Taylor's album, Gorilla. McDonald recorded on three James Taylor albums: Gorilla (1975), In the Pocket (1976) and JT (1977). McDonald toured with Taylor from 1975 to 1978.

In 1975 McDonald worked with Maurice White and the late Charles Stepney on Deniece Williams' This Is Niecy released in 1976. The disc rose to Nos. 3 and 33 on the Top R&B/Hip-Hop Albums and Billboard 200 charts and was certified gold.

In 1977, McDonald produced the Emotions' platinum album Rejoice with Maurice White. On the album was the No. 1 Hot 100 and R&B song, "The Best of My Love". The song won a Grammy for Best R&B Performance By A Duo Or Group With Vocals and an American Music Award for Favorite Soul/R&B Single.

=== Later years (2004–2021) ===
In 2004, McDonald recorded keyboards with Ray Charles on the song "Heaven Help Us All" for the Grammy Winning Best Gospel Song duet with Gladys Knight. McDonald arranged the song with David Blumberg and Randy Waldman. The song appears on Ray Charles’ last album, Genius Loves Company.

In 2007, Erykah Badu released "Honey", a song created with "I’m In Love," originally recorded by Nancy Wilson (Music on My Mind), produced by McDonald and co-written by McDonald, Fritz Baskett and David Shields. In 2008 the song was part of Badu's CD New Amerykah Vol. 1. The lead single, "Honey" reached No. 22 on the Billboard R&B/Hip Hop Charts.

In 2008, McDonald filmed and recorded a multi-media performance at the El Portal Theatre in North Hollywood, California. McDonald documents stories of Los Angeles’ rich recording history with music classics he's associated with: "Sara Smile"/ Hall & Oates (recorded at Larrabee Studios), "Summer Breeze"/Seals & Crofts (recorded at the Sound Factory), "Best Of My Love" / The Emotions (recorded at Hollywood Sound Recorders) and "How Sweet It Is (To Be Loved by You)"/ James Taylor (recorded at Warner Brothers Recording Studios).

In 2010, McDonald was co-writer and co-publisher of the No. 1 Billboard single "Everything To Me" recorded by Monica for her 2010 album Still Standing. The song remained at No. 1 on the R&B/Hip Hop Charts for seven consecutive weeks.

In September 2011, in response to Japan's natural disasters, McDonald recorded three songs for the "Jazz for Japan" all-star benefit album on Avatar Records. All proceeds from the recording project were to go directly to Japanese relief funds. McDonald was joined by notable jazz musicians including George Duke, Nathan East, Herman Jackson, Boney James, Ndugu Chancler, Billy Childs, Christian McBride, Marcus Miller and David T. Walker. He died on July 21, 2021, at the age of 76.

== Discography ==
With Blue Mitchell

- Stratosonic Nuances (RCA, 1975)
