= Here I Am (Monica song) =

Single by Monica featuring Trey Songz

from the album Still Standing
- Released: October 22, 2010
- Studio: Zone 4's Recording Studio (Atlanta, Georgia)
- Length: 3:44
- Label: J
- Songwriters: Monica Arnold; Ester Dean; Paul Dawson; Mark Hartnett; Jamal Jones; Jason Perry
- Producer: Polow da Don

Monica singles chronology
| "Love All Over Me" (2010) | "Here I Am" (2010) | "Anything (To Find You)" (2011) |

"Here I Am" is a song by American singer Monica, taken up from her sixth studio album, Still Standing (2010). It was composed by the former along with Ester Dean, Paul Dawson, Mark Hartnett, Jason Perry, and her cousin Polow da Don, featuring production by the latter. Chiefly written by Dean, the smoky downtempo song was initially written for and recorded by a male singer but partially reconstructed for Monica. Lyrically, "Here I Am" outlines a woman's physical desires over a dubstep-lite instrumental.

The album version of the song was lined up for a dual single release along with "Nothing Like Me" to US radios in fall 2009. However, its release was scrapped twice in favor of "Everything to Me" and "Love All Over Me", both of which served as the first two singles from the album. Eventually picked as the third and final single from Still Standing, the song was officially remixed with vocals from American singer Trey Songz. The duet version was released as a digital download in October 2010 and earned positive reviews from music critics. Prior to the album's release, the original version had charted on the Billboard Hot R&B/Hip-Hop Songs at number eighty-three.

== Background and release ==
"Here I Am" was written by Ester Dean, Paul Dawson, Mark Hartnett, Jason Perry, Monica and her cousin, Polow da Don, with production handled by the latter. It was one of the first songs on which Monica and da Don collaborated on for her-then upcoming album, Still Standing (2010), and one out of two songs that he was initially expected to contribute to the album. Monica later told Rap-Up magazine that she was very happy and keen to work with da Don, and that their personal bond had transformed "Here I Am" into a standout record amongst the tracks they had previously recorded. Referring to its style, she further added: “It’s a special song to me because it’s totally different than what I normally do.” Chiefly written by singer–songwriter Ester Dean, it was originally crafted for a man and a man previously recorded it. Upon playing it to Monica in the recording studio, the team decided on flipping it and made it fitting for a woman.

On October 27, 2009, Monica revealed on her Twitter account, that "Here I Am" along with Dean and Polow's other contribution, "Nothing Like Me", an uptempo collaboration with rapper T-Pain, was to be released as a dual lead single from Still Standing. Speaking on this decision, she tweeted: "This was the best way to satisfy my fans of 15 years and the new fans that I hope to gain.” However, its release was eventually scrapped, with Monica confirming in December 2009, that some undisclosed legal issues surrounding "Nothing Like Me" "didn't get cleared" in time. On April 2, 2010, Monica again turned to Twitter to announce that "Here I Am" was scheduled to be released as the album's second single, containing newly recorded vocals from J Records label mate Jamie Foxx. In a last minute change, the single was later switched to fan-favorite "Love All Over Me". "I didn't have a choice [...] I would never ignore the fans so we switched", the singer later replied. During touring with singer Trey Songz on the Passion, Pain & Pleasure Tour, "Here I Am" was eventually announced as the album's third single. In addition, it was revealed that Songz had replaced Foxx on the duet remix version of the original track.

== Critical reception ==
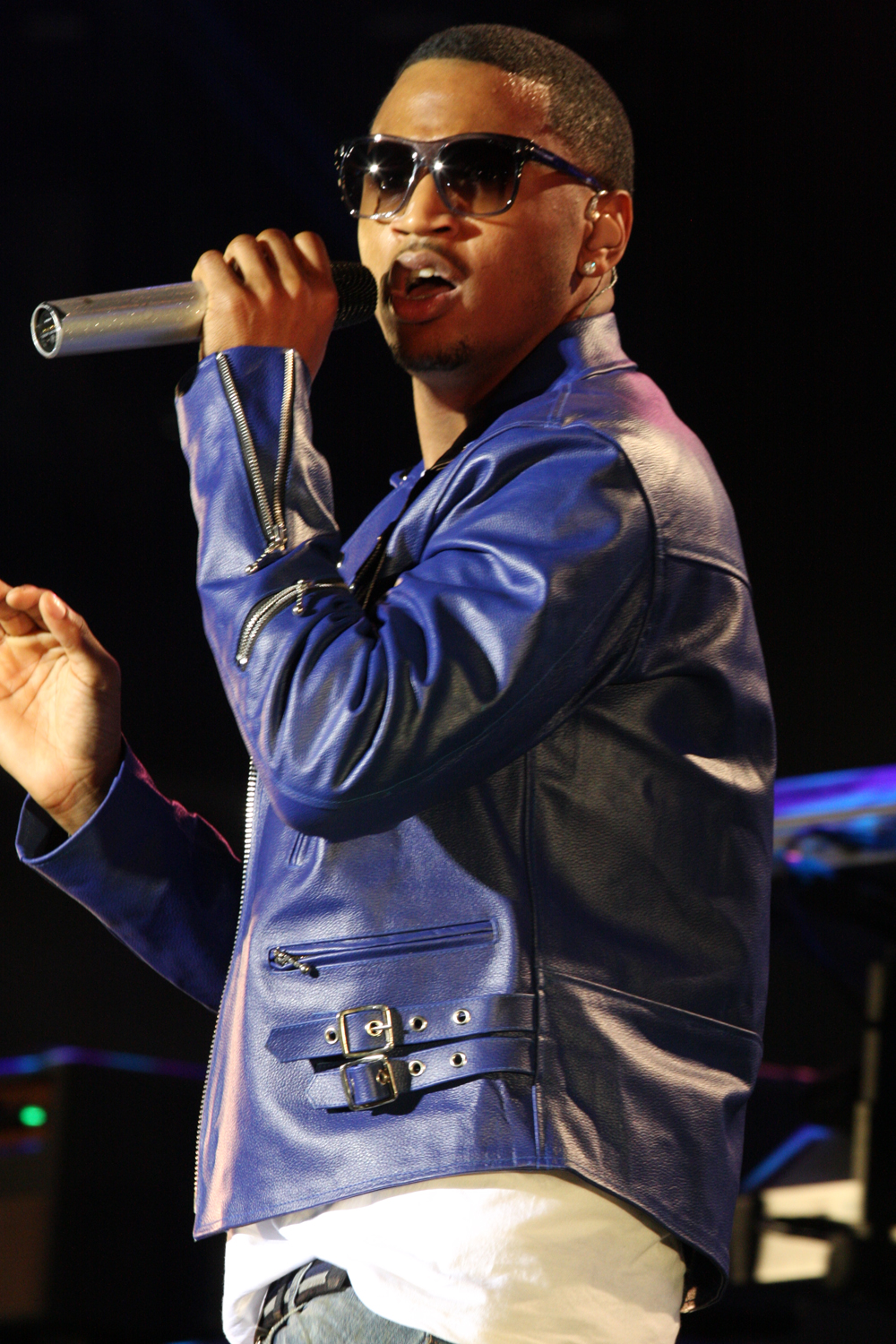
Trey Songz's appearance on the remix of "Here I Am" earned generally positive reviews.

In a review of the remix, music blog DJBooth.net wrote that "Trey Songz steps into the role of the fella who fulfills the singer’s needs when her main man is off at the club. After lacing Polow Da Don‘s reverb-drenched instrumental with a little soulful call-and-response and some glittering harmonies, the collaborators crescendo to a climax featuring some of the most dazzling vocal pyrotechnics." A fan of the original version, entertainment website ThatGrapeJuice.net called the song "R&B at its best", finding that "this stunning version deserves kudos in its own right". They added: that "despite not featuring new vocals from Monica, the addition of Songz surprisingly breathed new life into the song, with their respective vocals meshing exceptionally well. What’s more, Songz’s powerful runs sees this serve as one of his best vocal out yet." M. Gosho Oakes from SoulCulture wrote that "Responding with persuasive assurances of satisfaction, Trey Songz follows Monica‘s call all the way to the official remix for 'Here I Am'." Rap-Up magazine classified "Here I Am" as a "smoky slow jam".

== Charts ==
Chart performance for "Here I Am"
| Chart (2010) | Peak position |
|---|---|
| US Hot R&B/Hip-Hop Songs (Billboard) 2010 album version | 83 |

== Release history ==
Release dates and formats for "Here I Am"
| Country | Date | Format | Label | Ref. |
|---|---|---|---|---|
| United States | Digital download | October 22, 2010 | J | |
| Germany | Digital download | October 25, 2010 | Sony Music | |
