= Friends (Monica song) =

Single by Monica featuring Ty Dolla Sign
- Released: July 15, 2022
- Length: 4:10
- Label: Mondeenise
- Songwriters: Monica Arnold; Tyrone Griffin, Jr.; Briana Hightower; Dana Johnson; Robert Milton; LaTasha Williams; Robert Williams
- Producer: Tasha Catour

Monica singles chronology
"Trenches" (2020)	"Friends" (2022)	"Trusting God" (2023)

Music video
- "Friends" on YouTube

"Friends" is a song by American singer Monica. It was written by Monica, Ty Dolla Sign, Tasha Catour and Cousin band members Briana Hightower, Dana Johnson, and Robert Milton for her ninth studio album. Production was overseen by Catour, with Dolla Sign appearing as guest vocalist on the track. The song was released by Mondeenise Music as the album's fourth single on July 15, 2022, and reached number 37 on the US Billboard R&B/Hip-Hop Airplay chart.

== Background ==
"Friends" was co-written by Rob Milton, Dana Johnson, and Briana "Kreion" Hightower of the Atlanta group Cousin, while production was overseen by Tasha Catour. The song interpolates singer Patti LaBelle's 1992 single "Somebody Loves You Baby (You Know Who It Is)" and was first teased during Monica's acoustic Tiny Desk performance. Monica described "Friends" as being "about keeping people in their place and handling your own relationships [...] and keep them out of it as much as you can."

== Critical reception ==
Toronto Star critic Richie Assaly called the song "a match made in R&B heaven. On "Friends," backed by little more than an acoustic guitar and a tasteful dose of digital bass, Monica and Ty Dolla assume the role of two lovers resolved to dismiss the opinions of judgmental friends who would stand in their way." He found that "the song reaches its climax during the bridge, as the two singers trade vocal runs, their voices — one elegant, one raw and textured — weaving into a mighty crescendo."

Megan Grosfeld from Enspire noted that "Monica's emotions of an unbreakable bond for a special someone swell over the acoustic-lined production accompanied by a hard-hitting bass. Ty Dolla $ign is as heartfelt as Monica in the single. His verse is explaining to his lady that they must persevere through all the small bumps in the road if they want to grow and progress in their love. The two musician’s voices blend perfectly as one across the guitar strums and bass." HotNewHipHop editor Lawrencia Grose found that "Monica & Ty's tones collided perfectly as they sang about avoiding negativity from their peers."

== Chart performance ==
"Friends" debuted at number 50 on Billboard's US R&B/Hip-Hop Airplay chart in the week of October 22, 2022. It eventually peaked at number 37, becoming her first top 40 entry in three years.

== Music video ==
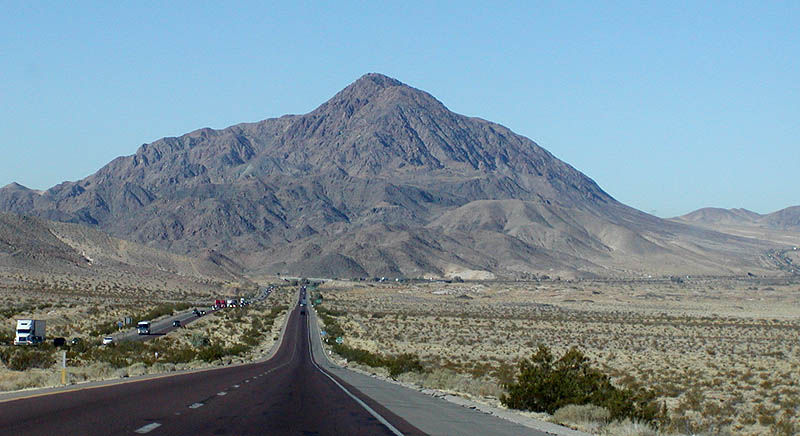
The video for "Friends" was filmed in the Mojave Desert in California.

A music video for "Friends" was directed by Sarah McColgan. Set in a California desert during a sandstorm and freezing temperatures, the visual opens with a dance number choreographed by New Zealand entertainer Parris Goebel. As the video continues, Monica and Ty Dolla Sign exchange glances under the sun.

== Charts ==
Chart performance for "Friends"
Chart (2022)	Peak position
US R&B/Hip-Hop Airplay (Billboard)	37

== Release history ==
Release dates and formats for "Friends"
Country	Date	Format	Label	Ref.
United States	July 15, 2022	Digital download; streaming	Mondeenise	
