= Me + You =

Single by Monica
- Released: April 26, 2019
- Length: 3:34
- Label: Mondeenise
- Songwriters: Denisia Andrews; Monica Arnold; Brittany Coney; Kyle Christopher
- Producer: Nova Wav

Monica singles chronology
"Commitment" (2019)	"Me + You" (2019)	"Trenches" (2020)

"Me + You" is a song by American R&B singer Monica. Recorded for what was then considered to be released as her ninth studio album, Chapter 38, it was written by Monica and Kyle Christopher along with Denisia "Blu June" Andrews and Brittany "Chi" Coney, while production was helmed by Andrews and Coney under their production moniker Nova Wav. Released by Mondeenise Music as a single on April 26, 2019, and reached number 17 on the US Billboard Adult R&B Songs.

== Critical reception ==
Soulbounce found that the "upbeat track is filled with bright, happy synths that flutter and buzz about like butterflies around her vocals. Meanwhile, 808s keep everything anchored and allow the addition of trappy drums to not seem jarring. Monica, meanwhile, rides the beat happily as she describes what it's like to love her man [...] It's a sweet sentiment and one that's sure to resonate with all the lovers in the house."

== Chart performance ==
Released as the follow-up to her number-one hit "Commitment" (2019), debuted on the US Billboard Adult R&B Songs on September 7, 2019. It eventually peaked at number 17 on December 14, 2022, becoming her 18th top ten entry on the chart.

== Promotion ==
A lyric video for "Me + You" premiered online on April 30, 2019.

== Credits and personnel ==
Credits adapted from Tidal.

- Denisia Andrews – producer, writer
- Monica Arnold – vocals, writer
- Brittany Coney – producer, writer
- Melinda Dancil – music director, production assistant
- Kyle Christopher – writer

== Charts ==
Chart performance for "Me + You"
Chart (2019)	Peak position
US Adult R&B Songs (Billboard)	17

== Release history ==
Release dates and formats for "Me + You"
Country	Date	Format	Label	Ref.
United States	April 26, 2019	Digital download; streaming	Mondeenise	
