= Jamal Jones =

American football player (born 1981)

No. 19, 89
- Position: Wide receiver

Personal information
- Born: April 24, 1981 (age 45); Washington, D.C., U.S.
- Listed height: 5 ft 11 in (1.80 m)
- Listed weight: 205 lb (93 kg)

Career information
- High school: DeMatha Catholic (Hyattsville, Maryland)
- College: North Carolina (1999–2000); North Carolina A&T (2001–2003)
- NFL draft: 2004: undrafted

Career history
- St. Louis Rams (2004)*; Green Bay Packers (2004–2005); → Frankfurt Galaxy (2005); New Orleans Saints (2006); Philadelphia Eagles (2008)*
- * Offseason or practice squad member only

Career NFL statistics
- Receptions: 6
- Receiving yards: 108
- Receiving touchdowns: 1
- Stats at Pro Football Reference

Jamal Aman Jones (born April 24, 1981) is an American former professional football player who was a wide receiver in the National Football League (NFL). He was originally signed by the St. Louis Rams as an undrafted free agent in 2004. He played college football for the North Carolina A&T Aggies. Jones is currently pursuing a master's degree in Public Administration from the Harvard Kennedy School.

== Early life ==
Jones attended DeMatha Catholic High School in Hyattsville, Maryland, and was a letterman in football. Jones graduated from DeMatha in 1999.
