= KidsAlive Charity =

U.S.-based nonprofit organization

Kids Alive International
- Founded: 1916; 110 years ago
- Founder: Rev. and Mrs. Leslie Anglin
- Type: 501(c)(3) religious nonprofit corporation
- Location: Alpharetta, Georgia
- Region served: 11 countries in Central America, South America, Africa, Middle East and Asia
- Revenue: US$13 million (2016)
- Employees: 96
- Website: www.kidsalive.org

Kids Alive International (KAI) is a Christian, U.S. based nonprofit organization that focuses on supporting the development of children, families, and communities. The organization has offices in 11 countries, including the United States, the Dominican Republic, Guatemala, Haiti, Peru, Kenya, South Sudan, Sudan, Zambia, Lebanon, Romania, and Taiwan.

== History ==
1916 Official founding of the Home of Onesiphorus in Taian, China, by Rev. and Mrs. Leslie Anglin. The ministry began when the Anglins opened their home to orphans and widows in the province.

1921 Leslie Anglin was in a trip to Hopei Province (now Hebei), a severe famine area, to rescue children; in this group of children was Samuel Hsaio who later traveled widely on behalf of Kids Alive and became the director of the Tsinan Home, the 2nd location in China.

1937 The home had a yearly average of 600 children, 95% of whom graduated from the home's school.

1948 Dar El Awlad Boys' Home opened in Beirut, Lebanon.

1953 Mission School established in Hong Kong for children of Chinese refuge families; by 1957 there were 350 pupils enrolled.

1962 Hong Kong missionaries started a Home for Boys in the New Territories, with 15 boys.

1975 Civil War began in Lebanon, ending in 1992. KAI continued operating there during this time; children and staff remained safe, even though there was some destruction to facilities.

1983 Name changed to Kids Alive International; home office moved to Valparaiso, Indiana.

1992 ANIJA School in Dominican Republic opened with Kindergarten and first grade. Hauna Schools in Hauna Village, Papua New Guinea, affiliated with Kids Alive.

2000 Kids Alive began ministry in Africa, affiliating with the Mt. Kenya Boys' Home, and a year later opened a children's home in Lusaka, Zambia.

2004 Kids Alive Peru purchased land for the Care Center in the Manchay slum of Lima, with the goal of identifying and helping single mothers find work to support their kids.

2021 The UK branch of Kids Alive changed its name from 'Hope for Kids' to 'Kids Alive International'.

== Programs ==
Kids Alive Schools

KAI's schools vary depending on the countries and the communities Currently, KAI has schools in Dominican Republic, Guatemala, Haiti, Peru, Kenya, Lebanon, Papua New Guinea, and Zambia.

Care Centers and Medical Clinics

KAI's Medical clinics provide vaccinations, screenings, nutritional evaluations, basic first aid care, and referrals to community medical facilities for advanced care.

Family-style Residential Homes

In cases where children are abandoned or appear to be orphans, KAI can work with authorities to locate a child's parents or other close family members. When a child has no home or is deemed unsafe in their own home because of abuse or exploitation concerns, the organization places them in small, family-style homes with dedicated caregivers.

"Keeping Families Together"

KAI offers assistance with nutrition, education, medical care, and sometimes entrepreneurial help.

=== Countries of Operation ===
- Lebanon 1948
- Taiwan 1971
- Dominican Republic 1989
- Guatemala 1992
- Peru 1992
- Kenya 2000
- Zambia 2001
- Haiti 2002

== Ratings ==
Kids Alive International has earned Charity Navigator's 16th consecutive 4-star rating.
