= Love All Over Me =

Single by Monica

from the album Still Standing
- Released: May 31, 2010
- Studio: Studio at the Palms (Paradise, Nevada); SouthSide Studios (Atlanta, Georgia)
- Length: 3:50
- Label: J
- Songwriters: Crystal Johnson; Jermaine Mauldin; Bryan-Michael Cox
- Producers: Jermaine Dupri; Bryan-Michael Cox

Monica singles chronology
"Always" (2010)	"Love All Over Me" (2010)	"Here I Am" (2010)

Music video
- "Love All Over Me" on YouTube

"Love All Over Me" is a song by American singer Monica. It was written by Crystal Johnson, Jermaine Dupri, and Bryan-Michael Cox for her sixth studio album Still Standing (2010), while production was helmed by Dupri, with Cox credited as co-producer of the song. Musically, "Love All Over Me" is a down-tempo R&B piece that rounds out Still Standing as another laid back, yet soulful track filled with admiration. The song was sent to rhythmic, urban, and urban adult contemporary airplay as the album's second single in the United States on May 31, 2010.

Critics received the song positively. In the United States, "Love All Over Me" peaked at number 58 on the Billboard Hot 100, also reaching number two on the Hot R&B/Hip-Hop Songs and the top of the Adult R&B Songs, becoming the album's second chart topper after lead single "Everything to Me" (2010). The song's accompanying music video, directed by Chris Robinson, features Monica pursuing her love interest in marriage.

== Chart performance ==
The song debuted on the Billboard Hot 100 chart at number 94, and then peaked at number 58 on the Billboard Hot 100. The song charted at number two on the US R&B/Hip-Hop chart. The song also hit number one on the Urban Adult Contemporary Mediabase.

== Music video ==
The Chris Robinson directed music video for "Love All Over Me" premiered on July 15, 2010, on 106 & Park. The plot of the video is Monica choosing between marrying her old love played by rapper Maino and her new love played by Shannon Brown. After the premiere of the video, fans could vote who Monica would pick as her love interest, resulting in the viewer's choice video being premiered July 23, 2010 on Vevo.

== Charts ==
=== Weekly charts ===
Weekly chart performance for "Love All Over Me"
Chart (2010)	Peak position
South Korea International (Circle)	72
US Billboard Hot 100	58
US Adult R&B Songs (Billboard)	1
US Hot R&B/Hip-Hop Songs (Billboard)	2

=== Year-end charts ===
Year-end chart performance for "Love All Over Me"
Chart (2010)	Position
US Adult R&B Songs (Billboard)	13
US Hot R&B/Hip Hop Songs (Billboard)	11
Chart (2011)	Position
US Hot R&B/Hip-Hop Songs (Billboard)	92

== Release history ==
Release dates and formats for "Love All Over Me"
Region	Format	Date	Label	Ref.
United States	May 31, 2010	Urban adult contemporary radio	J	
United States	June 15, 2010	Urban mainstream radio	J	
