= Still Standing (Monica song) =

Promotional single by Monica featuring Ludacris

from the album Still Standing
- Released: 2008
- Recorded: 2008
- Genre: R&B; hip hop
- Length: 4:18
- Label: J
- Songwriters: Christopher Bridges; Bryan Michael Cox; Adonis Shropshire; Monica
- Producer: Bryan Michael Cox

"Still Standing" is a song by American R&B singer Monica, written by Christopher Bridges, Adonis Shropshire, Bryan-Michael Cox and Monica for her sixth studio album, Still Standing (2010). Produced by Bryan-Michael Cox, it features guest vocals by her cousin and rapper Ludacris.

== Background ==
The record was originally intended to be released as the album's lead single, with its production and release being tracked by a single episode of the reality television show format Monica: The Single on Peachtree TV. However, as the label and the singer were not in agreement with the album's title track becoming the first single Monica set up additional sessions to find a new single.

Without an official single release, the song entered the US Billboard Hot R&B/Hip-Hop Songs chart at number 78 in the week of August 21, 2008, before sliding down the charts. In its fourth week, it rebounded from number 89 to number 74. The song reached number 65 on Billboard Digital Songs chart. It was sent to radio prior to the release of Still Standing, where it received some radio airplay.

== Live performances ==
Monica performed the song on for the national program special SOS Saving Ourselves – Help for Haiti Benefit on in early February with rapper Ludacris. It was received as one of the best performances overall that night. She performed it live on BET’s Black Girls Rock! on November 7, 2010 and The Mo'Nique Show on November 8, 2009. On August 22, 2020, it was announced that the latest Verzuz battle would be between Norwood and Monica. The challenge took place on August 31, 2020 at Tyler Perry Studios in Atlanta, Georgia and was watched by a record-breaking 1.2 million viewers on the Instagram live stream alone. Monica sang along to "Still Standing"in round 11, beating Brandy's 2020 single "Borderline".

== Charts ==
Chart performance for "Still Standing"
Chart (2008)	Peak position
US Hot R&B/Hip-Hop Songs (Billboard)	74
US Hot R&B/Hip-Hop Airplay (Billboard)	74
