= Everything to Me (Monica song) =

Single by Monica

from the album Still Standing
- Released: February 9, 2010
- Recorded: August 2009
- Studio: Goldmind (Miami), Hit Factory Criteria (Miami)
- Length: 3:16
- Label: J
- Songwriters: Fritz Baskett; Missy Elliott; Cainon Lamb; Clarence McDonald; Jazmine Sullivan
- Producers: Missy Elliott; Lamb

Monica singles chronology
"Trust" (2009)	"Everything to Me" (2010)	"Always" (2010)

Audio sample
- file; help

"Everything to Me" is a song by American singer Monica. It was written by fellow singer Jazmine Sullivan and co-produced by Missy Elliott and Cainon Lamb for her sixth studio album Still Standing (2010), incorporating a sample of the 1981 recording "Silly" as penned by Fritz Baskett, Clarence McDonald, and June Deniece Williams and performed by Deniece Williams.

Recorded during initially unplanned, additional recording sessions for the album, "Everything to Me" was released as the lead single from Still Standing in the United States on February 9, 2010 following a request campaign by fans on Twitter. The song garnered generally positive reviews by music critics, who noted it the album's standout track.

Monica's first solo release in over three years, the song has peaked at number forty-four on the US Billboard Hot 100 and number-one on the Hot R&B/Hip-Hop Singles & Tracks chart, becoming her first chart-topper in over seven years. The track was nominated for Best Female R&B Vocal Performance at the 53rd Annual Grammy Awards.

== Background and release ==
"Everything to Me" was one out of several tracks resulting from additional recording sessions with longtime contributor Missy Elliott, Monica set up following a disagreement over the album's leading single with her label J Records in summer 2008. Penned by Elliott's protégé and fellow R&B singer Jazmine Sullivan, it was recorded within three hours only. Incorporating elements of Deniece Williams' 1981 recording classic "Silly", the track saw the pair basically reprising the formula of previous successes such as "So Gone" and "A Dozen Roses (You Remind Me)," featuring music that has "an older feel," according to the singer.

Prior to the release of "Everything to Me" several songs were announced to lead Still Standing. Despite initial reports that uptempo record "Nothing Like", a collaboration with T-Pain, and Ester Dean-penned ballad "Here I Am", both being produced by Polow da Don, would be released as a dual single before 2010, neither song was released in time for the new year as "some of the legal issues [...] didn't get cleared," Monica confirmed on Twitter in December 2009. Instead, the album's A&R manager Larry Jackson announced on December 18, that the Los Da Mystro-produced "One in a Lifetime" and "Love All Over Me", produced by Jermaine Dupri, were being released instead as a dual single for 2010. It was not until January 7, 2010, however, that it was confirmed that "Everything to Me" had replaced both songs as the album's first single following a campaign by fans on Twitter. On J Records decision to change the single due to fan's request, Monica commented: "It just made me realize that people want authentic Monica. They don't want me to keep up with all the different gimmicks and trends that are taking place. So that's why we picked the new single because it's just me singing." A two-minute cut of the song was leaked onto the internet on January 8, 2010, and by January 27 the extended single version of "Everything to Me" had been released.

An official remix, also produced by Missy Elliott, featuring herself and the late Notorious B.I.G., and was leaked via Internet on April 22, 2010. The remix samples the instrumental from "I Love You More" by René & Angela. B.I.G.'s verse is taken from his song, "I Love the Dough" which utilized a similar sample, off his second and final studio album, Life After Death (1997).

== Reception ==
=== Critical reception ===
The song garnered generally positive reviews by critics, with About.com's Mark Edward Nero declaring "Everything to Me" the "album's standout track [...] as solid as a brick house; great singing, great lyrics, great production, just a great all-around song." The Washington Post reviewer Sarah Godrey declared the track one of the album's "catchiest inclusions," and further added: 'Everything to Me' borrows so much of Deniece Williams's 'Silly' that it almost feels accurate to call it a remake/rewrite of the original, but it's still sounds fresh." Ryan Brockington of the New York Post was less emphatic, calling it a "flat out copy" of "And I Am Telling You I'm Not Going" from the musical Dreamgirls.

=== Chart performance ===
"Everything to Me" instantly debuted at number sixty-one on the US Billboard Hot R&B/Hip-Hop Songs chart after only two days of airplay, Monica's highest debut for a single on this chart so far. Afterwards it jumped to number thirty-one on that particular chart, entering the top thirty, it eventually becoming her sixth number one hit. The song remained seven weeks atop, becoming Monica's long-running solo number-one to date, and made her the first artist to have chart-toppers in the 1990s, 2000s, and 2010s. The song also atop the Billboard Hot Adult R&B Airplay and Mediabase Urban Adult Contemporary charts.

The song also debuted at number eighty-two on the Billboard Hot 100 chart on February 18, 2010. The song fell to number ninety the following week but eventually rebounded to reach a peak of number forty-four, her highest-charting peak since 2004's "U Should've Known Better." In addition, the record reached number twenty-three on the Hot 100 Airplay (Radio Songs) chart and number twenty-one on the Hot Ringtones chart.

=== Awards and nominations ===
The track was nominated for Best Female R&B Vocal Performance at the 53rd Annual Grammy Awards.

== Music video ==
Monica and Johnson in the music video for "Everything to Me"

The music video for "Everything to Me" was shot by director Benny Boom and was filmed in Los Angeles, California on February 8, 2010. Based on a treatment by Boom and fellow director Chris Robinson, it was loosely inspired by the plot of the 2009 thriller Obsessed.

The video features former Cincinnati Bengals wide receiver Chad Johnson as Monica's love interest, the focus and victim of a stalker, while the singer herself plays his loving then outraged wife. The clip was dedicated to the memory of the late Alexander McQueen, a fashion designer who Monica admired and whose gowns and other pieces appear in the video. McQueen was found dead at his London apartment three days before the video shooting.

=== Reception ===
After airing a behind the scenes promo video on February 22, 2010, the video made its world premiere on February 23, 2010 on Vevo and on BET's video-chart countdown program, 106 & Park, the day after, at a peak position of number one for several weeks.

== Live performances ==
Monica performed the song on Lopez Tonight on April 14, 2010 with the Lopez band, Michael Bearden and the Ese Vato's. It was received as one of her best performances in her career. She performed it live on The Tonight Show with Jay Leno on April 5, 2010, Chelsea Lately on May 6, 2010, and The Mo'Nique Show on May 5, 2010, along with a medley of her previous hits "Don't Take It Personal (Just One of Dem Days)", "So Gone", and "Before You Walk Out of My Life". Monica also performed the song on the 2010 BET Awards with Deniece Williams. Other performance was Fox 5 Atlanta's Good Day Atlanta and The Wendy Williams Show.

== Charts ==
=== Weekly charts ===
Weekly chart performance
Chart (2010)	Peak position
Japan (Japan Hot 100)	85
South Korea International (Circle)	35
US Billboard Hot 100	44
US Hot R&B/Hip-Hop Songs (Billboard)	1

=== Year-end charts ===
Year-end chart performance
Chart (2010)	Position
US Adult R&B Songs (Billboard)	10
US Hot R&B/Hip Hop Songs (Billboard)	4
US Radio Songs (Billboard)	72

== Release history ==
Release dates and formats for "Everything to Me"
Region	Format	Date	Label	Ref.
United States	Digital download	February 9, 2010	J	
Canada	Digital download	February 9, 2010	J	
United States	Radio airplay	March 23, 2010	J	

== See also ==
- R&B number-one hits of 2010 (USA)
