= Still Standing (Monica album) =

Studio album by Monica
- Released: March 19, 2010
- Recorded: 2007–2010
- Studios: Carrington House; Doppler Studios; Studio at the Palms; Zone 4 Studios
- Genre: R&B
- Length: 39:30
- Labels: Worldwide; J; Arista
- Producers: Monica Arnold; Larry Jackson; Bryan-Michael Cox; Jermaine Dupri; Missy Elliott; Andrew Fampton; Kevin D. Hicks; Jim Jonsin; Cainon Lamb; Andre Lindal; Bei Maejor; Los Da Mystro; Ne-Yo; Polow da Don; The Runners; Stargate; Tha Bizness; WyldCard

Monica chronology
The Makings of Me (2006)	Still Standing (2010)	New Life (2012)

Singles from Still Standing
- 1. "Everything to Me" Released: February 9, 2010; 2. "Love All Over Me" Released: May 31, 2010; 3. "Here I Am" Released: October 22, 2010

Still Standing is the sixth studio album by American R&B singer Monica. It was released on March 19, 2010, by Worldwide Entertainment, J Records and Arista Records. Recording for the album began in 2007, in which the singer intended to take a more traditional approach to the genre and take away any "gimmicks". As executive producer of the album, Monica enlisted a variety of producers including involvement by Missy Elliott, Bryan-Michael Cox, Stargate, The Runners and Jermaine Dupri. Production on Still Standing was chronicled by Monica's BET reality series of the same name which aired between October 2009 and January 2010.

The album received mostly positive reviews, based on an aggregate score of 71/100 from Metacritic, with critics perceiving its sound as "a return to the mid-'90s heyday" of contemporary R&B. It was a commercial success, debuting at number two on the US Billboard 200 chart, selling 184,000 in its first week, and reaching the top of the Top R&B/Hip-Hop Albums chart, becoming Monica's second album to do so. Still Standing was certified gold by the Recording Industry Association of America (RIAA) for shipments of 500,000 copies. To date, the album has sold 474,000 copies in the United States according to Billboard.

The lead single, "Everything to Me", peaked at number forty-four on the US Billboard Hot 100 and number-one on the Hot R&B/Hip-Hop Singles & Tracks chart, becoming her first chart-topper in over seven years. The track was nominated for Best Female R&B Vocal Performance at the 53rd Annual Grammy Awards. The second single, "Love All Over Me", was released in May 2010 and reached number two on the R&B/Hip-Hop chart. The album was nominated for a Grammy Award for Best R&B Album, presented at the 53rd Grammy Awards in 2011.

== Background ==
In 2006, Monica's fifth studio album The Makings of Me was released. For the production of the album, the singer had re-teamed with most of her regular contributors and although the final track listing comprised an outweighing slower set of mid-tempo recording and ballads, J Records settled on "Everytime tha Beat Drop", a heavily snap-influenced up-tempo record which had initially been recorded for a So So Def mixtape, to lead the album — against the grain of the singer, who felt that the song did not speak to her core audience and was a poor representation of the album. Upon its release, The Makings of Me failed to reprise the multi-million sales success of previous albums, only selling 328,000, copies in the United States, and while it produced four single releases, none of them managed to chart or sell noticeably, garnering Monica her least commercially successful project yet.

Still during the promotion of the album, the singer acknowledged that she had to follow a more honest approach on her next project: "[The success of The Makings of Me] just made me realize that people want authentic Monica," she stated. "They don't want me to keep up with all the different gimmicks and trends that are taking place." In late 2007, Monica started work on her follow-up album. Intending to create a record that lived up to the sound her previous hits, particularly those from the 1990s, she expressed that she wanted to appeal to her existing fans although her label was concerned with making the project sound up to date: "I am going back to where I started. The next album I would like people to get more songs like "Why I Love You So Much," "Angel of Mine," or the things they really, really love from me [...]." Originally titled Lessons Learned—a reference to the mistakes Monica felt she made with The Makings of Me – the singer decided to change the project after recording the album's title track in 2008 as she felt that Still Standing was more appropriate for the body of work that she and Bryan-Michael Cox pulled off.

== Recording ==
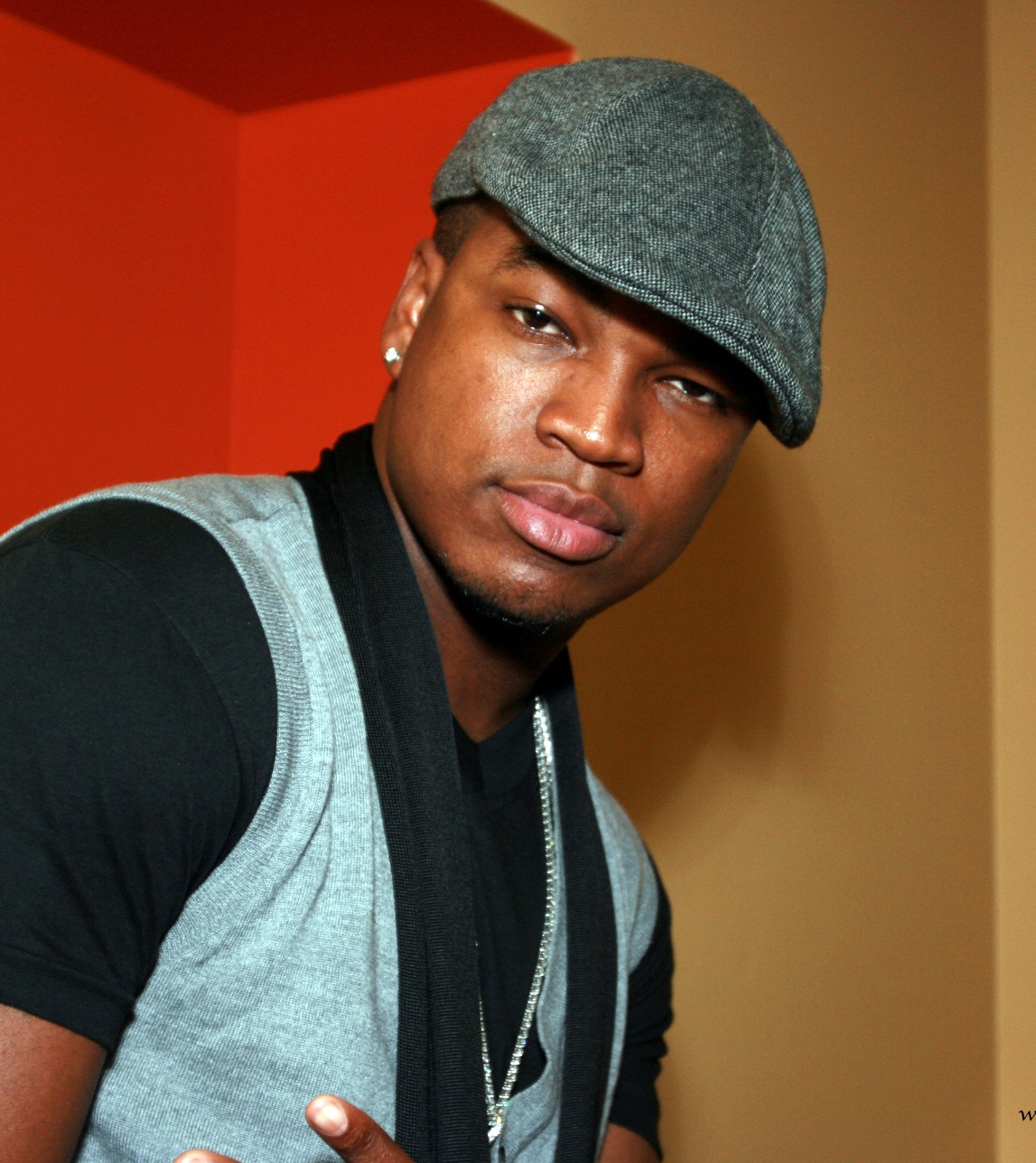
Singer–songwriter Ne-Yo was amongst the people to work with Monica.

Recording for the album took place during 2007 to 2010 at several recording studios, including Carrington House, Doppler Studios, and Zone 4 Studios in Atlanta, Georgia, and Studio at the Palms in Paradise, Nevada. Producers and songwriters having collaborated with Monica on the album include longtime collaborators Jermaine Dupri, Missy Elliott, Bryan-Michael Cox, and his co-producer WyldCard, as well as writers and producers that she had not worked with in the past, including Jim Jonsin, Bei Maejor, Andre Lindal, Los Da Mystro, singer Ne-Yo, songwriters Ester Dean and Crystal Johnson, Norwegian production duo Stargte and her elder cousin Polow da Don. Over the course of several recording periods, Monica worked on "hundreds of songs" for the album, herself serving as its executive producer and J Records A&R president Larry Jackson as co-executive. Finally, only ten tracks were selected to be placed on the regular edition of Still Standing while three additional tracks were chosen to be released as free bonus tracks through different retailers. Others songs from established hitmakers such as Dallas Austin, Babyface, Drumma Boy, J Ferrari, Sean Garrett, Jazze Pha, and Soulshock & Karlin did not make the cut. Monica's team also was in negotiations with R. Kelly to contribute to Still Standing. In an interview, Lil Jon moreover stated that he was "about to do some work with Monica".

Although the debut episode of the reality television show Monica: The Single on Peachtree TV was filmed to promote the release of the album's leading single, J Records and the singer were not in agreement with "Still Standing" becoming the first single, and thus, Monica set up additional sessions with Missy Elliott in August 2009 to find new singles. In parallel, she resumed recording with Polow da Don, Dallas Austin and Sean Garrett. Whilst at Zone 4 Studios Timbaland had some creative input into the project, voicing his opinion about "Everything to Me" being a good future single choice, but did not make any musical contribution to the project. As part of her reality TV series, Monica revealed that she was planning to record all of her own backing vocals for the album. Several tracks from the album's recording sessions leaked early which sparked a response from Monica on the eighth episode of her reality TV show: "I think it's unfair when a song like "Let Me Know" leaks. The fans don't get to hear it properly as it's not finished. It might not be a true representation of the album if it is not included on the final tracklisting." As a result of the leak, a small internal investigation was launched at J Records to find the source of the leak.

== Content ==
The production of opening track "Still Standing", one of the first songs written for the album, was tracked by the reality television show format Monica: The Single on Peachtree TV in 2008. A well-received anthem about empowerment, starting with "an icy club-busting backbeat and a gothic, low-octave choir," it features guest vocals by Monica's cousin Ludacris and was initially considered to be released as the album's first single, but J Records rejected to promote the song as Still Standing′s lead. Nevertheless, the track managed to debut within the top eighty on the US Billboard Hot R&B/Hip-Hop Songs chart and was used as the theme song of Monica: Still Standing the following year. Second track, Los Da Mystro-crafted "One In a Lifetime", was among a number of songs that leaked a year prior to the album's official release. Announced as the album's leading single at a time, the "lush, piano-laced" song deals with finding true love. Ne-Yo-penned third track titled "Stay or Go", one out of several tracks the songwriter and Monica worked on over a course of a week, deals with a "if you're not going to treat me right, then here's the option"–nature, according to Monica. "He wanted to do a record that spoke to who I am," she said, "and he reached back into my history on how I've delivered records in a sassy yet vocal way."

"Everything to Me"
Monica's top ten hit is a slow-driven love song.

"Love All Over Me"
The album's second single, which contains a "knocking bassline".

"Everything to Me", the album's fourth track and official first single, reunited Monica with producer Missy Elliott and saw the pair basically reprising the formula of previous successes such as "So Gone" (2003) and "A Dozen Roses (You Remind Me)" (2006). A musical ode to all things good in life, written by singer Jazmine Sullivan, the retro ballad contains a prominent sample of the Deniece Williams' 1981 recording "Silly". Released to rave reviews among critics, who noted it the album's "standout track — as solid as a brick house; great singing, great lyrics, great production, just a great all-around song," "Everything to Me" became the singer's most-successful release in years. Elliott also contributed "If You Were My Man", one of the few up tempo songs on Still Standing, which Monica described as the song, who was most out of her character. Originally titled "Betcha", the track samples Evelyn "Champagne" King's 1982 record "Betcha She Don't Love You", featuring heavy elements of 1980's music, and garnered a mixed response by critics, whose reviews of the song alternated between "blemish", "brainless", and "funky". "Mirror", the sixth track produced by Jim Jonsin, was recorded late into the production of the album. A song about self-acceptance, Monica noted the composition one of her personal standouts on the album: "Its basically about being able to look at yourself in the mirror and be completely happy with the person that you are," she said. "Having no shame or feeling pain again, and I am at that place in my life."

Seventh track "Here I Am" was penned by Ester Dean and produced by Monica's elder cousin Polow da Don, marking their first collaboration. Led by a "bluesy guitar riff", the song deals with unrequited love, and has been announced as an official single from the album on numerous occasions, only to be replaced at the last minute each time. In April 2010, Monica confirmed on Twitter that she had re-recorded the song as a duet with Jamie Foxx, although he was later replaced by fellow R&B singer Trey Songz. "Superman", another production by Bryan Michael Cox, is an acoustic guitar-dominated ballad with syncopated drum pattern, in which she idolizes her man as a hero, comparing him with the same-titled DC Comics superhero. The track received a positive response among critics, who called it one of the finest moments on Still Standing: "Monica shows her range [...] and gives it some muscle." The album's ninth song and second single, Cristyle-penned "Love All Over Me", is producer Jermaine Dupri's only contribution to the record. Monica described the song as "about being strictly in love where everything feels right." Ending track "Believing in Me", an acoustic ode to moving beyond heartbreak, was contributed by Stargate.

== Release and promotion ==
After numerous delays Still Standing was eventually released on March 23, 2010, in the United States. First released in the Netherlands on March 19, it received a limited release through RCA Records and Sony Music on most major music markets until the end of April 2010. The album's marked Monica's third album released under her contract with J Records, following the renewal of her joint venture with the label in October 2007. Prior to its release, Monica debuted her reality series Monica: Still Standing on the BET network on October 27, 2009. She appeared on BET's 106 & Park on February 22, 2010, to promote the album, and made further appearances as a guest or co-host on the show on March 22, 2010, and March 23, 2010. On March 23, she also performed on CBS's The Early Show in promotion of the album. At the 2010 BET Awards, the singer performed "Everything to Me" alongside Deniece Williams who sang one of her signature songs "Silly". Monica also served as a co-header with Trey Songz on the 2010 Passion, Pain & Pleasure Tour in the following summer.

=== Singles ===
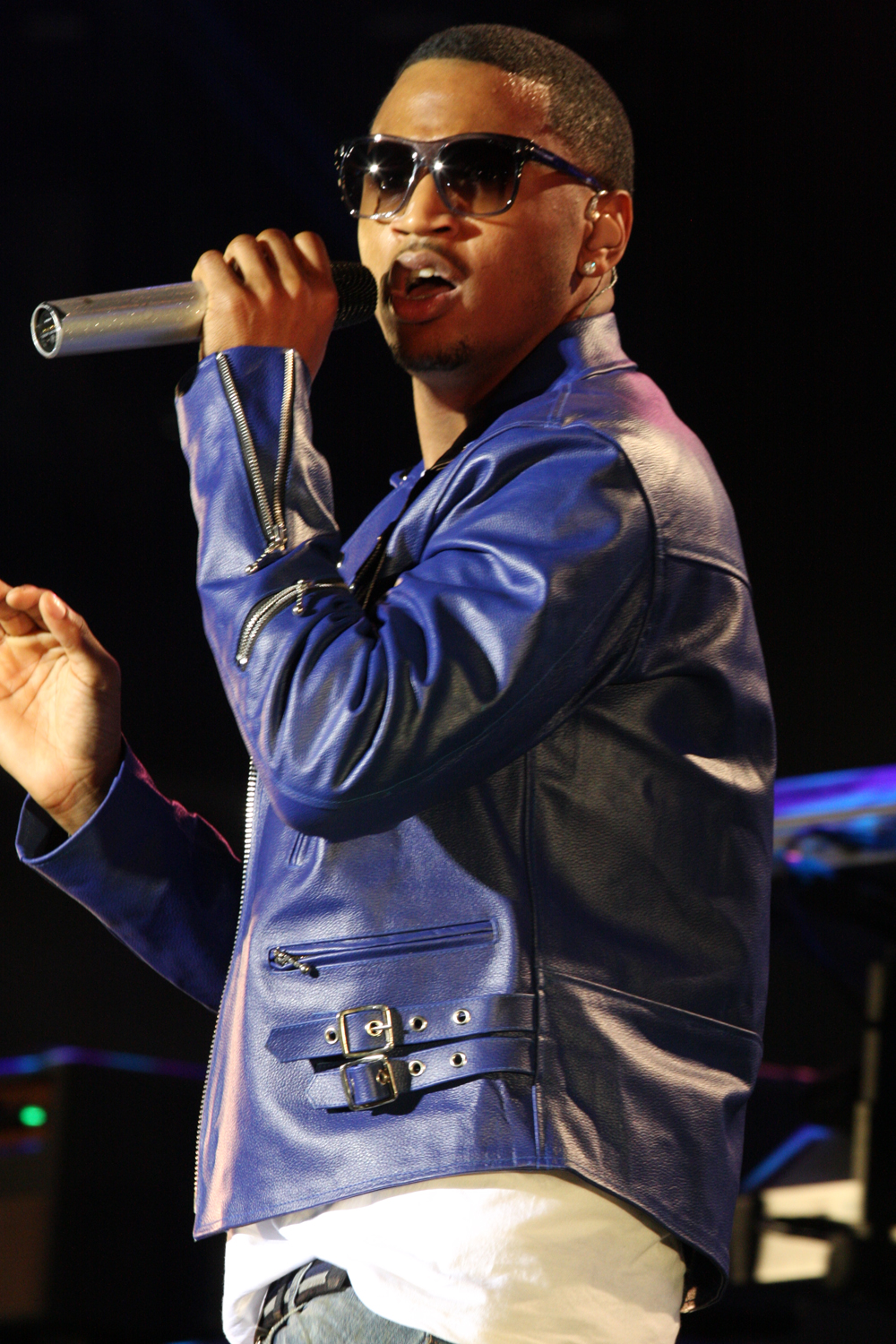
Trey Songz was featured on a remix of the album's third offering "Here I Am".

"Still Standing", featuring Ludacris was released as a buzz single from the album in August 2008. Despite being only sent to radio, it peaked at number seventy-four on the Hot R&B/Hip-Hop Songs chart. "One In a Lifetime" peaked on the Japan Hot 100 charts at sixty-six due to airplay and digital sales. Confirmed as the first single from the album, "Everything to Me" was leaked onto internet in the first week of January 2010 and officially sent to urban and rhythmic radio formats on February 9, 2010. Monica's highest peak since 2004 "So Gone", the song eventually became her sixth number one hit on the Billboard Hot R&B/Hip-Hop Songs chart and remained seven weeks atop, making it her longest-running solo number-one to date. In addition, its peak made Monica the first artist to score chart-toppers in the 1990s, 2000s, and 2010s. A moderate success on the Billboard Hot 100, it also peaked at number forty-four on the regular pop chart. The song also charted at number eight-five on the Japan Hot 100.

The second single, "Love All Over Me" was sent to radio in May 2010. It peaked at number fifty-eight on the US Billboard chart and reached number two on the Hot R&B/Hip-Hop Songs chart, becoming Monica's twelfth top ten hit on that chart. In September 2010, "Here I Am", featuring Trey Songz, was confirmed as the album's third single. The track features vocals by fellow singer Trey Songz. A remix of "Here I Am" was initially planned as a radio single but was only released as a digital download. The album version of the song had previously debuted on the Hot R&B/Hip-Hop Songs chart at number eighty-three.

== Critical reception ==
Professional ratings
Aggregate scores
Source	Rating
Metacritic	71/100
Review scores
Source	Rating
About.com	4/5 stars
AllMusic	3.5/5 stars
Boston Herald	B−
Entertainment Weekly	B+
Now	4/5
PopMatters	8/10 stars
Slant Magazine	2/5 stars
USA Today	3/4 stars

Still Standing received generally positive reviews from music critics. At Metacritic, which assigns a normalized rating out of 100 to reviews from mainstream critics, the album received an average score of 71, based on six reviews. AllMusic writer Andy Kellman commented that the album "benefits from quality control and a handful of particularly strong ballads". About.com's Mark Edward Nero called it "one of the stronger albums of Monica's career so far". Entertainment Weekly's Mikael Wood called the album "a low-key delight" and perceived its sound as reminiscent of 1990s-R&B, stating "the appealingly unflashy CD feels like a return to the mid-'90s heyday of acts such as Deborah Cox and Total." USA Today's Edna Gundersen called it "a gimmick-free set of cool R&B tracks". Andrew Rennie of Now wrote that it is "rich with songs about self-validation, love lost and subsequent recovery, and doesn't let up on that thematic gas pedal until the last tune."

However, The Boston Globe's Ken Capobianco viewed its songs as "predictable" and wrote "Monica is a vivid singer with gorgeous tone, but she's forced to breathe life into songs that don't live up to her capabilities." Luke Winkie of Slant Magazine described its music as "unembellished and bland", while calling the album "immediately forgettable, inhabiting the colorless world that has doomed the majority of mainstream R&B over the last decade." Despite writing that Monica "puts forth her richest vocal efforts", Boston Herald writer Lauren Carter called the album's songs "uninspiring", describing it as "the middle ground" and "r & b blandness". Mariel Concepcion of Billboard wrote that Still Standing lacks "Monica's spunk and sass", but ultimately commended her lyrical maturity and called the album "fluid lyrically and musically". The Washington Post's Sarah Godfrey complimented its production and Monica's musical style, stating "The disc is a lean 10 tracks, and while the sound is more mature than her 1995 debut Miss Thang, as it should be, her mellow style of R&B remains comfortingly intact."

=== Accolades ===
Still Standing was nominated for two 2011 Grammy Awards, Best R&B Album and Best Female R&B Vocal Performance for "Everything to Me." It also received a Top R&B Album nomination at the 2011 Billboard Awards.

== Commercial performance ==
Still Standing debuted and peaked at number two on the US Billboard 200 chart with first week sales of 184,000 copies; becoming Monica's second highest US chart-debut behind After the Storm (2003). On the Billboard R&B/Hip-Hop Albums chart, the album reached number one; it also debuted at number two on the Digital Albums chart. One month after its release, the album was certified gold by the Recording Industry Association of America (RIAA), for shipments of 500,000 copies on April 21, 2010. As of August 2010, Still Standing has sold 474,000 copies in the United States, according to Billboard. In Japan the album peaked at number 129, while in the United Kingdom, it debuted and peaked at number twenty-five on the UK R&B Albums Chart.

== Track listing ==
Still Standing track listing
No.	Title	Writer(s)	Producer(s)	Length
1.	"Still Standing" (featuring Ludacris)	Monica Arnold; Bryan-Michael Cox; Adonis Shropshire; Christopher Bridges	Cox	4:14
2.	"One in a Lifetime"	Carlos McKinney; Natalie Walker; Farrah "Fendi" Fleurimond	Los da Mystro	4:31
3.	"Stay or Go"	Brandon Green; Shaffer Smith	Bei Maejor; Ne-Yo^{[a]}	3:40
4.	"Everything to Me"	Missy Elliott; Cainon Lamb; Jazmine Sullivan; Fritz Baskett; Clarence McDonald; June Deniece Williams	Elliott; Lamb^{[a]}	3:17
5.	"If You Were My Man"	Elliott; Lamb; Sullivan; Michael Jones	Elliott; Lamb^{[a]}	3:26
6.	"Mirror"	James Scheffer; Andrew Fampton	Jim Jonsin; Fampton	4:17
7.	"Here I Am"	Jamal Jones; Ester Dean; Paul Dawson; Arnold; Jason Perry; Mark Hartnett	Polow da Don	3:43
8.	"Superman"	Cox; Johntá Austin; Kevin D. Hicks; Kendrick Dean	Cox; Hicks^{[b]}; WyldCard^{[b]}	4:32
9.	"Love All Over Me"	Jermaine Dupri; Cox; Crystal Johnson	Dupri; Cox^{[a]}	3:50
10.	"Believing in Me"	Mikkel Storleer Eriksen; Tor Erik Hermansen; Andre Lindal; Phillip Jackson	StarGate; Lindal^{[a]}	4:00
Total length:				39:30

US physical bonus track
No.	Title	Writer(s)	Producer(s)	Length
11.	"I Want It All" (featuring Trina)	Katrina Taylor; Christopher Whitacre; Justin Henderson	Tha Bizness	4:04

US Amazon MP3 bonus track
No.	Title	Writer(s)	Producer(s)	Length
11.	"Lesson Learned"	Arnold; Cox; K. Dean; Shropshire	Cox; WyldCard	4:48

Sony Music Store pre-order bonus track
No.	Title	Writer(s)	Producer(s)	Length
11.	"All I Know"	K. Dean; Tosha Polk; Torica Corneilious	WyldCard	4:56

Japanese bonus track
No.	Title	Writer(s)	Producer(s)	Length
11.	"Blackberry"	Elliott; Lamb; Taurian Osbourne	Elliott; Lamb^{[a]}; Osbourne^{[a]}	4:36

Notes

- ^{^a} signifies a co-producer
- ^{^b} signifies an additional producer

Sample credits

- "Everything to Me" contains a sample of Deniece Williams's "Silly" (1981).
- "If You Were My Man" contains a sample of Evelyn "Champagne" King's "Betcha She Don't Love You" (1982).

== Personnel ==
Credits for Still Standing adapted from AllMusic.

- Adonis Shropshire – vocal producer, background vocals
- Derek Blanks – photography
- Monica – executive producer, producer, vocals, background vocals
- Anita Marisa Boribbon – art direction, design
- Candice Childress – production coordination
- Bryan-Michael Cox – bass guitar, drums, executive producer, instrumentation, keyboards, piano, producer, programming
- D-Boi – drums, programming
- Carlos "Los Da Mystro" McKinney – conductor, instrumentation
- Melinda Dancil – producer
- Kevin "KD" Davis – mixing
- Jermaine Dupri – engineer, producer
- Tony Duran – photography
- Missy "Misdemeanor" Elliott – engineer, producer
- Mikkel S. Eriksen – instrumentation
- Paul J. Falcone – engineer, mixing
- Ira Folson – engineer
- Andrew Frampton – keyboards, producer
- Moses Gallart – assistant
- Mark Gary – assistant
- Jazmine Sullivan – background vocals
- Jocelyn Johnson – background vocals
- Chris Gehringer – mastering
- Erwin Gorostiza – creative director
- Mark Gray – assistant
- Tor Erik Hermansen – instrumentation
- Kevin Hicks – additional production, guitar, programming
- Aaron Holton – engineer
- John Horesco IV – engineer
- Josh Houghkirk – mixing assistant
- Larry Jackson – producer
- Jim Jonsin – arranger, keyboards, producer, programming
- Damien Lewis – assistant, engineer
- Andre Lindal – composer, instrumentation, producer
- Bei Maejor – producer, background vocals
- Rob Marks – mixing
- Mylah Morales – make up
- Ne-Yo – producer
- Taurian "TJ" Osbourne – keyboards
- Carlos Oyanedel – engineer
- Dave Pensado – mixing
- Polow da Don – producer
- Geno Regist – engineer
- Adrian "Drop" Santalla – engineer
- Stargate – producer
- Jay Stevenson – engineer
- Noah Tafua – assistant
- Phil Tan – mixing
- Sam Thomas – engineer, mixing
- Wouri Vice – stylist
- Andrew Wuepper – assistant
- WyldCard – additional production, keyboards, organ, strings, vocal producer

== Charts ==
=== Weekly charts ===
Weekly chart performance for Still Standing
Chart (2010)	Peak position
Canadian Albums (Nielsen SoundScan)	191
Japanese Albums (Oricon)	129
UK R&B Albums (Official Charts)	25
US Billboard 200	2
US Top R&B/Hip-Hop Albums (Billboard)	1

=== Year-end charts ===
Year-end chart performance for Still Standing
Chart (2010)	Position
US Billboard 200	48
US Top R&B/Hip-Hop Albums (Billboard)	15

== Certifications ==
Certifications for Still Standing
Region	Certification	Certified units/sales
United States (RIAA)	Gold	500,000^{^}
^{^} Shipments figures based on certification alone.

== Release history ==
Release dates and formats for Still Standing
Region	Date	Label	Catalog	Ref.
Netherlands	March 19, 2010	Sony Music	88697403982	
United Kingdom	March 22, 2010	RCA	88697403982	
United States	March 23, 2010	J	886974039822	
Canada	March 23, 2010	RCA		
Japan	April 7, 2010	Sony Music Japan	SICP2506	
Germany	April 9, 2010	Sony Music	88697403982	
