= Monica discography =

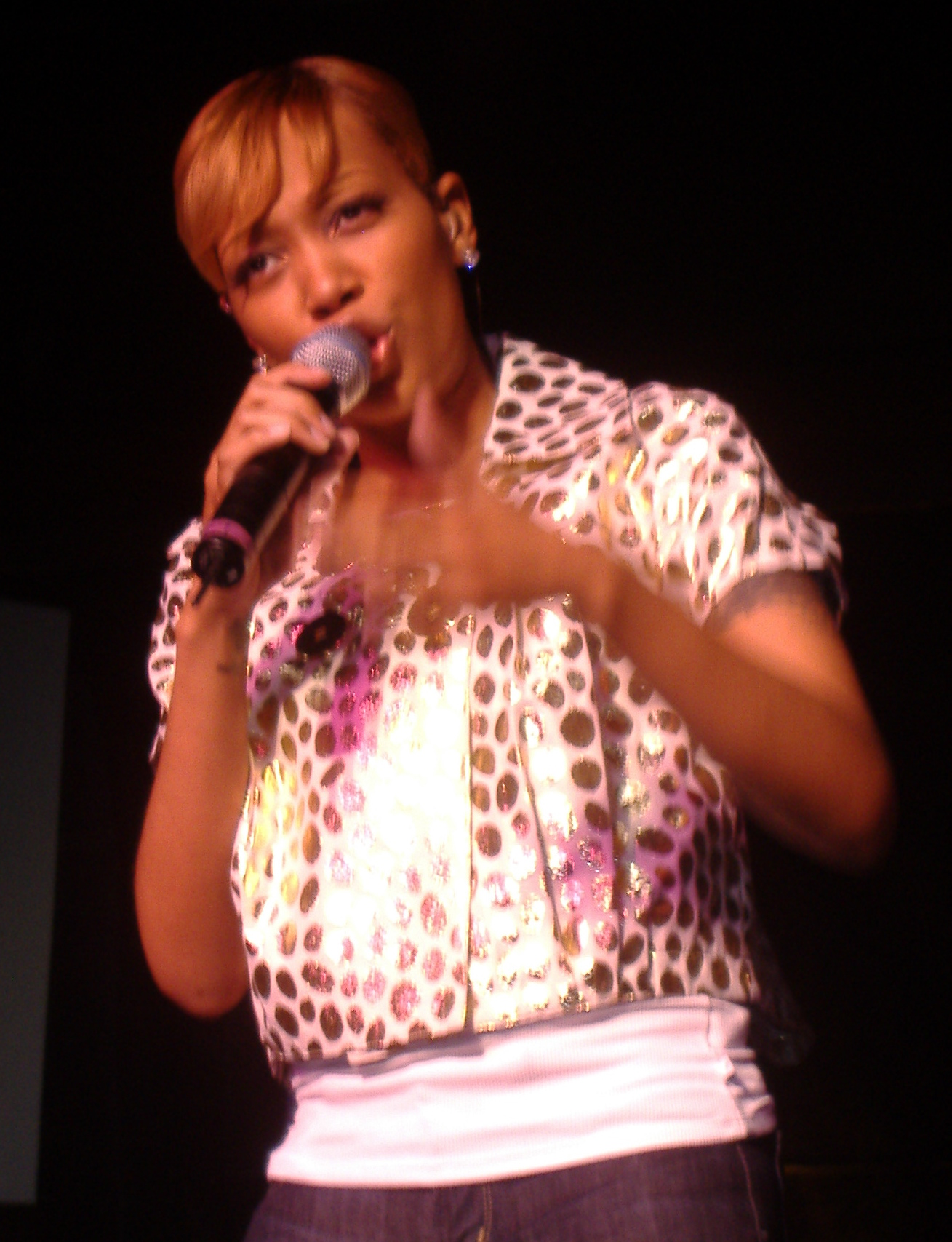
- Studio albums: 8
- Singles: 48
- Video albums: 8

American R&B singer Monica has released 8 studio albums, one extended play, and 48 singles (including six as a featured artist). Since the beginning of her career in 1995, she has sold 5.3 million albums in the United States, In 1999, Billboard included her among the top twenty of the Top Pop Artists of the 1990s, and in 2010, the magazine ranked her 24th on its list of the Top 50 R&B and Hip Hop Artists of the past 25 years. With a career lasting over 20 years, Monica became the first artist to top the US Billboard Hot R&B/Hip-Hop Songs chart in the 1990s, 2000s, and 2010s.

Monica's debut studio album, titled Miss Thang was released in July 1995, selling about 1.5 million million copies in the United States. It produced three top ten singles, including debut single "Don't Take It Personal (Just One of Dem Days)" and follow-up "Before You Walk Out of My Life", both of which made her the youngest artist ever to have two consecutive chart-topping hits on the Billboard Hot R&B Singles chart. In 1997, Monica released the top five single "For You I Will", which originated from the sports comedy film Space Jam and its soundtrack and became another platinum seller. Her second album The Boy Is Mine was released in 1998 and earned her major international chart success. It peaked at number eight on the Billboard 200 and was certified three-times platinum in the United States and Canada. Pushed by its same-titled number-one hit, a massive commercial success duet with fellow R&B teen singer Brandy, it spawned five commercially released singles, including further chart-topper "The First Night" and "Angel of Mine".

After a label switch to J Records, Monica released After the Storm in 2003, a retooled version of her third album, All Eyez on Me (2002), which had received a Japan-wide release only after its first single's commercial failure and an early leak via the internet. The album became the singer's first album to debut at number-one on the Billboard 200 chart and eventually sold more than a million copies stateside, with its single "So Gone" becoming Monica's biggest-selling singles in years. Her fifth studio album, The Makings of Me, released in 2006, was considered a commercial failure and was left uncertified by the Recording Industry Association of America (RIAA).

In 2009, Monica's duet with singer Keyshia Cole, "Trust", reached the top five of Billboard's Hot R&B/Hip-Hop Songs chart. The recording of her sixth studio album Still Standing (2010) was chronicled by her BET reality series of the same name. It spawned her biggest-charting single in seven years, "Everything to Me", her sixth number-one hit on the Hot R&B/Hip-Hop Songs chart. Still Standing was eventually certified gold by the RIAA, with domestic shipments of 500,000 copies, and also produced the R&B top ten hit "Love All Over Me". In 2012, Monica's seventh album New Life was released to moderate sales. Its four singles, including lead single "It All Belongs to Me", another duet with Brandy, failed to achieve any Billboard Hot 100 entry. In 2015, her eighth studio album Code Red was released.

== Albums ==
=== Studio albums ===
List of studio albums, with selected chart positions, sales figures and certifications
Title	Details	Peak chart positions										Sales	Certifications
Title	Details	US	US R&B	AUS	CAN	GER	JPN	NL	NZ	SWI	UK	Sales	Certifications
Miss Thang	Released: July 18, 1995; Label: Rowdy; Formats: cassette, CD	36	7	125	20	—	—	41	9	—	—	US: 1,500,000	RIAA: 3× Platinum; MC: Gold
The Boy Is Mine	Released: July 14, 1998; Label: Arista; Formats: cassette, CD	8	2	37	10	34	69	13	17	19	52	US: 2,016,000	RIAA: 3× Platinum; BPI: Silver; MC: 3× Platinum; RIAJ: Gold
All Eyez on Me	Released: September 11, 2002; Label: J; Formats: CD	—	—	—	—	—	14	—	—	88	—		
After the Storm	Released: June 17, 2003; Label: J; Formats: CD, digital download	1	2	192	56	—	—	—	—	—	136	US: 1,023,000	RIAA: Gold
The Makings of Me	Released: October 3, 2006; Label: J; Formats: CD, digital download	8	1	—	—	—	75	—	—	—	—	US: 328,000	
Still Standing	Released: March 23, 2010; Label: J; Formats: CD, digital download	2	1	—	191	—	129	—	—	—	— (Note: "Still Standing" did not enter the UK Albums Chart, but debuted peaked at number 25 on the UK Hop Hop and R&B Albums Chart.)	US: 474,000	RIAA: Gold
New Life	Released: April 6, 2012; Label: RCA; Formats: CD, digital download	4	2	—	—	—	—	—	—	—	— (Note: "New Life" did not enter the UK Albums Chart, but debuted and peaked at number 20 on the UK Hip Hop and R&B Albums Chart.)		
Code Red	Released: December 18, 2015; Label: RCA; Formats: CD, digital download	27	4	—	—	—	—	—	—	—	—		
"—" denotes a title that did not chart, or was not released in that territory.

=== Compilations ===
- Super Hits (2008, Sony BMG Music Entertainment – A 721551)
- S.O.U.L. (2013, Sony BMG Music Entertainment - 88883702912)

== Extended plays ==
- Dance Vault Remixes: Get It Off/Knock Knock (2004)

== Singles ==
=== As lead artist ===
List of singles as lead artist, with selected chart positions and certifications, showing year released and album name
Title	Year	Peak chart positions										Certifications	Album
Title	Year	US	US R&B	AUS	CAN	GER	IRL	NL	NZ	SCO	UK	Certifications	Album
"Don't Take It Personal (Just One of Dem Days)"	1995	2	1	7	—	—	—	20	5	—	32	RIAA: Platinum; ARIA: Gold	Miss Thang
"Like This and Like That" (Note: "Before You Walk Out of My Life" and "Like This and Like That" were each released as a double A-side single in the US, however, in the UK and New Zealand each song was released separately.)	1995	7	1	—	—	—	—	—	18	—	33		Miss Thang
"Before You Walk Out of My Life"	1995	7	1	60	—	—	—	—	8	78	22	RIAA: Platinum	Miss Thang
"Why I Love You So Much" (Note: "Why I Love You So Much" and "Ain't Nobody" was a released as a double A-side single in the US only.)	1996	9	3	96	—	—	—	—	22	—	—	RIAA: Gold	Miss Thang
"Ain't Nobody" (featuring Treach)	1996	9	3	—	—	—	—	—	—	—	—		The Nutty Professor: Soundtrack
"For You I Will"	1997	4	2	45	75	80	—	51	2	78	27	RIAA: Platinum	Space Jam: Music from and Inspired by the Motion Picture and The Boy Is Mine
"The Boy Is Mine" (with Brandy)	1998	1	1	3	1	5	2	1	1	22	2	RIAA: 2× Platinum; ARIA: Platinum; BPI: Platinum; BVMI: Gold; RMNZ: 2× Platinum	The Boy Is Mine
"The First Night"	1998	1	1	30	9	63	30	22	15	29	6	RIAA: Platinum	The Boy Is Mine
"Angel of Mine"	1999	1	2	12	5	—	—	—	36	81	55	RIAA: Platinum; ARIA: Gold	The Boy Is Mine
"Street Symphony"	1999	— (Note: "Street Symphony" did not enter the Billboard Hot 100, but peaked at number 20 on the Bubbling Under Hot 100 Singles chart, which acts as a 25-song extension to the Hot 100.)	50	—	—	—	—	—	—	—	—		The Boy Is Mine
"Right Here Waiting" (featuring 112)	1999	—	— (Note: "Right Here Waiting" did not enter the Hot R&B/Hip-Hop Songs chart, but peaked at number 1 on the Bubbling Under R&B/Hip-Hop Singles chart, which acts as a 25-song extension to the R&B/Hip-Hop Songs chart.)	—	—	—	—	—	—	—	—		The Boy Is Mine
"Just Another Girl"	2001	64	34	—	—	—	—	—	—	—	—		Down to Earth: Music from the Motion Picture
"All Eyez on Me"	2002	69	32	39	—	81	—	—	29	—	—		All Eyez on Me
"So Gone"	2003	10	1	72	17	—	—	—	—	—	82		After the Storm
"Knock Knock"/"Get It Off" (Note: "Knock Knock" was a B-side with "Get It Off". However, the songs charted separately as singles. "Get It Off" did not enter the Hot R&B/Hip-Hop Songs chart, but peaked at number 3 on the Bubbling Under R&B/Hip-Hop Singles chart, which acts as a 25-song extension to the R&B/Hip-Hop Songs chart.)	2003	75	24	—	—	—	—	—	—	—	—		After the Storm
"U Should've Known Better"	2004	19	6	—	—	—	—	—	—	—	—		After the Storm
"Everytime tha Beat Drop" (featuring Dem Franchize Boyz)	2006	48	11	—	—	—	—	—	—	—	—		The Makings of Me
"A Dozen Roses (You Remind Me)"	2006	—	48	—	—	—	—	—	—	—	—		The Makings of Me
"Sideline Ho"	2007	—	45	—	—	—	—	—	—	—	—		The Makings of Me
"Hell No (Leave Home)" (featuring Twista)	2007	—	— (Note: "Hell No (Leave Home)" did not enter the Hot R&B/Hip-Hop Songs chart, but peaked at number 14 on the Bubbling Under R&B/Hip-Hop Singles chart, which acts as a 25-song extension to the R&B/Hip-Hop Songs chart.)	—	—	—	—	—	—	—	—		The Makings of Me
"Trust" (with Keyshia Cole)	2009	70	5	—	—	—	—	—	—	—	—		A Different Me
"Everything to Me"	2010	44	1	—	—	—	—	—	—	—	—		Still Standing
"Love All Over Me"	2010	58	2	—	—	—	—	—	—	—	—		Still Standing
"Here I Am" (solo or featuring Trey Songz)	2010	—	83	—	—	—	—	—	—	—	—		Still Standing
"Anything (To Find You)" (featuring Rick Ross)	2011	— (Note: "Anything (To Find You)" did not enter the Hot 100 chart, but peaked at number 19 on the Bubbling Under Hot 100 Singles chart, which acts as a 25-song extension to the Hot 100.)	25	—	—	—	—	—	—	—	—		New Life
"Until It's Gone"	2011	—	22	—	—	—	—	—	—	—	—		New Life
"It All Belongs to Me" (with Brandy)	2012	—	23	—	—	—	—	— (Note: "It All Belongs to Me" did not enter the Dutch Top 100 but peaked at number 84 on the Urban Top 100 chart.)	—	—	—		New Life
"Without You"	2012	—	91	—	—	—	—	—	—	—	—		New Life
"Just Right for Me" (featuring Lil Wayne)	2015	—	—	—	—	—	—	—	—	—	—		Code Red
"Commitment"	2019	—	—	—	—	—	—	—	—	—	—		Non-album singles
"Me + You"	2019	—	—	—	—	—	—	—	—	—	—		Non-album singles
"Trenches" (featuring Lil Baby)	2020	— (Note: "Trenches" did not enter the Billboard Hot 100, but peaked at number 32 on the Digital Song Sales Chart.)	—	—	—	—	—	—	—	×	—		Non-album singles
"Pink" (with Dolly Parton, Jordin Sparks, Rita Wilson, and Sara Evans)	2020	—	—	—	—	—	—	—	—	×	—		Non-album singles
"Friends" (featuring Ty Dolla Sign)	2022	—	— (Note: "Friends" did not enter the Billboard Hot 100 R&B/Hip Hop Songs Chart, but peaked at number 37 on the Billboard R&B/Hip Hop Airplay Chart.)	—	—	—	—	—	—	×	—		Non-album singles
"Trusting God" (with James Fortune)	2023	—	—	—	—	—	—	—	—	×	—		Non-album singles
"Letters"	2023	—	— (Note: "Letters" did not enter the US R&B Chart, but peaked at number 11 on the US R&B Digital Songs Sales Chart.)	—	—	—	—	—	—	×	—		Non-album singles
"The Boy Is Mine (Remix)" (with Ariana Grande and Brandy)	2024	— (Note: "The Boy Is Mine (Remix)" did not enter the US Billboard Hot 100 Chart, but peaked at number 21 on the US Digital Song Sales Chart.)	—	—	—	—	—	—	40	×	—		Eternal Sunshine (Slightly Deluxe and Also Live)
"—" denotes releases that did not chart, were not released in that country or did not receive a certification. "×" denotes periods where charts did not exist or were not archived.

=== As featured artist ===
List of singles as lead artist, with selected chart positions, showing year released and album name
Title	Year	Peak chart positions				Album
Title	Year	US	US R&B	US Gospel	GER	Album
"Freedom" (with Various artists)	1995	44	18	—	—	Panther: The Original Motion Picture Soundtrack
"I've Got to Have It" (Jermaine Dupri and Nas featuring Monica)	2000	—	67	—	76	Big Momma's House: Music from the Motion Picture
"Wake Up Everybody" (with Various artists)	2004	—	—	—	—	Wake Up Everybody
"Always" (Trina featuring Monica)	2010	—	42	—	—	Amazin'
"Hold On" (James Fortune featuring Monica)	2012	—	57	2	—	Identity
"Do Me Like That" (Trendsetter Sense featuring Monica, Yo Gotti and Jeezy)	2015	—	—	—	—	Non-album single
"—" denotes releases that did not chart or were not released in that country.

=== Promotional singles and other charted songs ===
List of promotional singles, with selected chart positions, showing year released and album name
Title	Year	Peak chart positions			Album
Title	Year	US R&B	JPN	KOR	Album
"Inside" (Note: "Inside" was a Europe release only but failed to chart on any official charts.)	1999	—	—	—	The Boy Is Mine
"Gone Be Fine" (featuring OutKast)	1999	— (Note: "Gone Be Fine" did not enter the Hot R&B/Hip-Hop Songs chart, but peaked at number 5 on the Bubbling Under R&B/Hip-Hop Singles chart, which acts as a 25-song extension to the R&B/Hip-Hop Songs chart.)	—	—	The Boy Is Mine
"Too Hood" (featuring Jermaine Dupri)	2002	— (Note: "Too Hood" did not enter the Hot R&B/Hip-Hop Songs chart, but peaked at number 11 on the Bubbling Under R&B/Hip-Hop Singles chart, which acts as a 25-song extension to the R&B/Hip-Hop Songs chart.)	—	—	All Eyez on Me
"I Ain't Trying to Hear It" (Dirtbag featuring Monica)	2007	—	—	—	Dirty Business
"Still Standing" (featuring Ludacris)	2008	74	—	—	Still Standing
"One in a Lifetime"	2010	—	66	—	Still Standing
"Take a Chance" (featuring Wale)	2012	—	—	20	New Life
"—" denotes releases that did not chart or were not released in that country.

== Other appearances ==
=== Guests ===
List of non-single songs with guest appearances by Monica
Title	Year	Artist(s)	Album
"Streets Keep Callin'"	1999	C-Murder, Daz Dillinger	Bossalinie
"Grown-Up Christmas List"	2000	—N/a	Platinum Christmas
"Class Reunion"	2003	Wyclef Jean	Preacher's Son
"Don't Gotta Go Home"	2003	DMX	Grand Champ
"Don't Be Cruel"	2003	Beenie Man, Missy Elliott	This Is Not a Test!
"For My Niggaz"	2005	Do or Die, The Legendary Traxster	D.O.D.
"I'll Give All My Love to You"	2007	Keith Sweat	Sweat Hotel Live
"Thugs Need Love Too"	2008	Rocko	Self-Made
"How I Like It"	2010	Rocko	Wild Life
"Can't Live Without You"	2010	Ludacris	Battle of the Sexes
"I Want It All"	2010	Trina	Amazin'
"Closer"	2013	LL Cool J	Authentic
"Ocean Skies"	2015	Ludacris	Ludaversal
"Forgive Me"	2015	Jeezy	Church in These Streets
"Burglar Bars"	2017	2 Chainz	Pretty Girls Like Trap Music
"JOOTD"	2017	Young M.A	Herstory
"We Ride"	2017	Gucci Mane	Mr. Davis
"Big A$AP"	2020	A$AP Ferg	Floor Seats II
"Pray"	2021	Jimmie Allen, Little Big Town	Bettie James: Gold Edition
"Family Feud"	2021	Yung Bleu	No, I'm Not OK
"Love Me Enough"	2023	Nicki Minaj and Keyshia Cole	Pink Friday 2

=== Soundtracks ===
List of non-single songs on soundtrack appearances by Monica
Title	Year	Artist(s)	Album
"Let's Straighten It Out"	1995	Usher	Panther: The Original Motion Picture Soundtrack / Miss Thang
"Missing You"	1996	—N/a	Fled
"Somebody Bigger than You and I"	1996	Whitney Houston, Ralph Tresvant, Bobby Brown	The Preacher's Wife: Original Soundtrack Album
"Slow Jam"	1997	Usher	Soul Food: Soundtrack/Music from the Motion Picture "Soul Food"/ My Way
"Angel"	2000	—N/a	Love Song
"This Boy Here"	2000	Akon	Love Song
"What My Heart Says"	2000	—N/a	Love Song
"Angel of Mine"	2000	—N/a	Wings of the Crow
"Uh Oh"	2002	—N/a	Drumline: Soundtrack
"Can I Walk By"	2004	Jazze Pha	Dirty Dancing: Havana Nights - Original Motion Picture Soundtrack
"Sick & Tired"	2005	—N/a	Diary of a Mad Black Woman
"Have Yourself a Merry Little Christmas"	2013	—N/a	The Best Man Holiday: Original Motion Picture Soundtrack

== See also ==
- List of songs recorded by Monica
- Monica videography
