= Monica videography =

Monica video discography
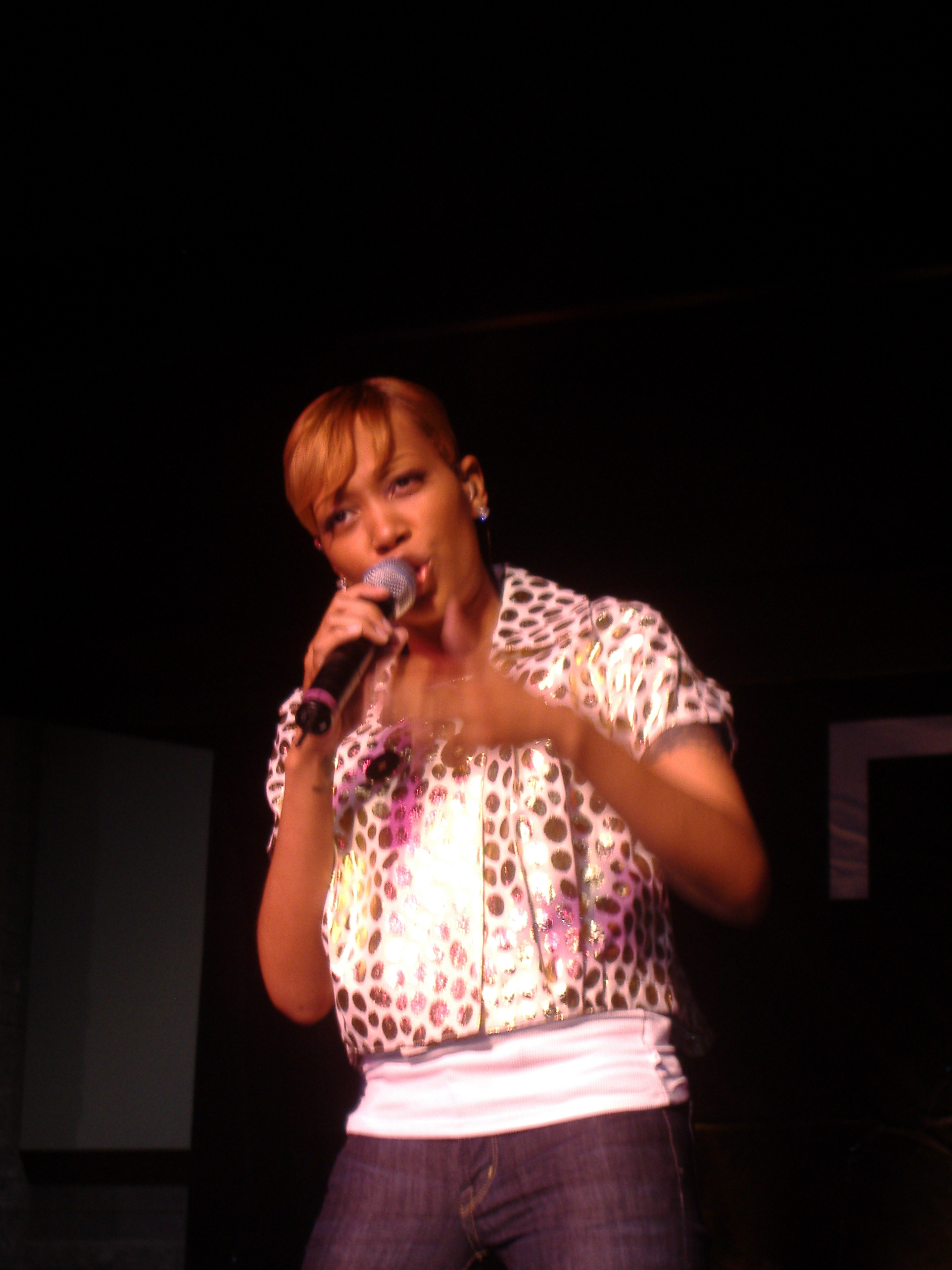
- Monica performing in a concert in May 2007.
- Music videos: 30+

American recording artist Monica has appeared in numerous music videos. Her videography includes more than thirty music videos. At age thirteen, Monica signed with Arista and released her debut album Miss Thang in 1995. An accompanying music video for the single, shot in black-and-white, was directed by Rich Murray and released in June 1995. In 1998, her second album The Boy Is Mine earned her major international chart success. Pushed by its number-one hit title track, a duet with singer Brandy, won the Best Clip (R&B/Urban) accolade at the 1998 Billboard Music Awards and received two MTV Video Music Award nominations.

== DVDs ==
| Year | DVD |
|---|---|
| 1999 | Angel of Mine Tour: Video Collection; Released: 2000 (Japan); Formats: VHS, DVD, VHS |
| 2003 | Get It Off/Knock Knock: DVD Single; Released: 2003; Formats: DVD |

== Music videos ==
=== 1990s ===
| Title | Year | Director(s) | Artist(s) |
|---|---|---|---|
| "Don't Take It Personal (Just One of Dem Days)" | 1995 | Rich Murray | Monica |
| "Freedom (Theme from Panther)" | 1995 | Antoine Fuqua | Various Artists |
| "Like This and Like That" | 1996 | Keith Ward | Monica feat. Mr. Malik |
| "Before You Walk Out of My Life" | 1996 | Kevin Bray | Monica |
| "Why I Love You So Much" | 1996 | Kevin Bray | Monica |
| "Ain't Nobody" | 1996 | David Nelson | Monica feat. Treach |
| "For You I Will" | 1997 | Francis Lawrence | Monica |
| "The Boy Is Mine" | 1998 | Joseph Kahn | Brandy & Monica |
| "The First Night" | 1998 | Joseph Kahn | Monica |
| "Angel of Mine" | 1999 | Diane Martel | Monica |
| "Street Symphony" | 1999 | Darren Grant | Monica |
| "Inside" | 1999 | Earle Sebastian | Monica |

=== 2000s ===
| Title | Year | Director(s) | Artist(s) |
|---|---|---|---|
| "I've Got to Have It" | 2000 | Dave Meyers | Jermaine Dupri feat. Monica & Nas |
| "Just Another Girl" | 2000 | Dave Meyers | Monica |
| "All Eyez on Me" | 2002 | Chris Robinson | Monica |
| "So Gone" | 2003 | Chris Robinson | Monica |
| "Knock Knock"/"Get It Off" | 2003 | Chris Robinson | Monica |
| "U Should've Known Better" | 2004 | Benny Boom | Monica |
| "Wake Up Everybody" | 2004 | Matthew Rolston | Various Artists |
| "Everytime tha Beat Drop" | 2006 | Ray Kay | Monica feat. Dem Franchize Boyz |
| "A Dozen Roses (You Remind Me)" | 2006 | Chris Robinson | Monica |
| "Trust" | 2009 | Chris Robinson | Keyshia Cole & Monica |

=== 2010s ===
| Title | Year | Director(s) | Artist(s) |
|---|---|---|---|
| "Everything to Me" | 2010 | Benny Boom | Monica |
| "Love All Over Me" | 2010 | Chris Robinson | Monica |
| "Anything (To Find You)" | 2011 | Chris Robinson | Monica |
| "Until It's Gone" | 2011 | Diane Martel | Monica |
| "It All Belongs to Me" | 2012 | Chris Robinson | Monica & Brandy |
| "Hold On" | 2012 | Bobby Yan | James Fortune & FIYA feat. Monica and Fred Hammond |
| "Just Right for Me" | 2015 | The Rite Brothers | Monica feat. Lil Wayne |
| "Commitment" | 2019 | Teyana Taylor | Monica |

=== 2020s ===
| Title | Year | Director(s) | Artist(s) |
|---|---|---|---|
| "Trenches" | 2020 | The Rite Brothers | Monica featuring Lil Baby |
| "Friends" | 2022 | Sarah McColgan | Monica featuring Ty Dolla Sign |
| "Letters" | 2023 | Richard Selvi | Monica |

=== Guest appearances ===
| Title | Year | Director(s) | Artist(s) |
|---|---|---|---|
| "Welcome to Atlanta" | 2002 | Marc Klasfeld | Jermaine Dupri feat. Ludacris |
| "Dance with My Father" | 2003 | Diane Martel | Luther Vandross |
| "Goodies" | 2004 | Benny Boom | Ciara |
| "That's Right" | 2007 | The Fat Cats | Ciara feat. Lil Jon |
| "Dis Morning" | 2008 | Gabriel Hart | Rocko |
| "Never Ever" | 2009 | Chris Robinson | Ciara feat. Young Jeezy |
| "Slow Dance" | 2009 | Chris Robinson | Keri Hilson |
| "Electric Lady" | 2014 | Alan Ferguson | Janelle Monáe |
| "Why I Still Love You" | 2020 | Derek Blanks & Missy Elliott | Missy Elliott |
| "The Boy is Mine" | 2024 | Christian Breslauer | Ariana Grande |
