= The Boy Is Mine Tour =

2025 concert tour by Brandy and Monica

- Tour by Brandy and Monica
- Promotional poster
- Location: North America
- Start date: October 16, 2025
- End date: December 14, 2025
- No. of shows: 32
- Supporting acts: Keyshia Cole; Coco Jones; Muni Long; Mya; Jamal Roberts; Kelly Rowland
- Producer: Black Promoters Collective
Brandy tour chronology
Slayana World Tour (2016)	The Boy Is Mine Tour (2025)
Monica tour chronology
Code Red Experience (2015)	The Boy Is Mine Tour (2025)

The Boy Is Mine Tour was the co-headlining concert tour by the American singers Brandy and Monica. Produced by Black Promoters Collective, the tour was announced in June 2025, in celebration of their 1998 duet, "The Boy Is Mine."

== Background ==
In 1998, Brandy and Monica collaborated on the song "The Boy Is Mine". Released as the lead single from both singers' second albums from 1998, Never Say Never and The Boy Is Mine, it became the first number-one pop hit for both artists, in the US and internationally, ultimately selling 2.6 million copies and spending thirteen weeks atop the Billboard Hot 100, making it the best‑selling single in the US that year. Though both Brandy and Monica consistently denied that the song reflected any genuine rivalry between them, emphasizing that its intent was to convey the opposite, tabloid media often portrayed their collaboration as evidence of a feud. Sustained media attention, record‑label dynamics, and competing fanbases contributed to strains in their relationship. After years of limited contact, they collaborated again on the 2012 single "It All Belongs to Me" and later appeared together on a Verzuz battle in 2020, four years before reuniting once more on Ariana Grande's remix of her 2024 song, similarly titled "The Boy Is Mine".

With Brandy having hinted at the idea of a joint tour multiple times during their Verzuz battle, often as playful banter, the singers officially announced their co-headlining tour on June 24, 2025, accompanied by a cinematic short film directed by filmmaker and production designer Ethan Tobman. Set in a maximum-sound asylum, the tour trailer finds Brandy and Monica using their powerful and "forbidden" harmonies to break free. Produced by Black Promoters Collective and initially comprising 24 arena dates, the tour expanded the following month with three additional concerts in Florida, featuring Kelly Rowland, Muni Long, and 2025 American Idol winner Jamal Roberts joining as supporting acts. Brandy and Monica framed the tour as a celebration of their shared history, growth, and enduring fan support, emphasizing that it was more than a musical reunion but honoring their journeys, their impact on R&B, and the bond with their fans, highlighting themes of sisterhood, respect, and purpose. Both noted that the timing felt right to come together and give audiences what they had long hoped to see.

== Critical reception ==
In a review for Variety, Steven J. Horowitz described the November 9 show at Kia Forum as a "ceaseless conveyor belt of hits," noting that while past their commercial peak, Brandy and Monica are "far from being nostalgia acts." He praised their contrasting styles, writing that "their performance styles never felt at odds." Similarly, Billboard editor Gail Mitchell called the same show "chock-full of boisterous sing-alongs, rigorous seat-dancing and lively shout-outs," praising the duo for showcasing their "estimable catalogs of hits and fan fave tracks" across a six-act performance. Joey Guerra of Houston Chronicle described the December 7 show as "a perfect musical close to a year that needed one last blast of joy." He emphasized the concert’s nostalgic power, noting that "nostalgia becomes a shared language, a communal experience that allows us to relive the music," and praised both singers' enduring artistry, writing that Brandy's "Never Say Never [...] still sounds ahead of its time" and Monica's hits like "Before You Walk Out of My Life" and "So Gone" highlighted her influence on fans’ personal histories. He also noted the tribute to Whitney Houston. For the Detroit stop, Metro Times critic Kahn Santori Davison highlighted the duo's enduring chemistry, describing their six-act show as "curated into forty songs" and noting that both singers "looked and sounded as amazing as they did three decades ago." He emphasized special moments, including Monica bringing out Detroit rappers Kash Doll, Skilla Baby, and Icewear Vezzo, and tributes to Whitney Houston and Aaliyah.

Milwaukee Journal Sentinel's Tamia Fowlkes praised the final show at Fiserv Forum for reclaiming Brandy and Monica's narrative, blending hits like "Full Moon" and "Street Symphony" with tributes to Whitney Houston. She highlighted the dynamic staging, fashion, and choreography, noting the finale’s puppet imagery symbolized unity and a legacy "defined not by competition, but by sisterhood and perseverance." Carlos Omar Gardinet from The Miami New Times described the Miami performance as a "full-on time machine," praising how the tour combined nostalgia with powerful live vocals. He noted that the performance of "The Boy Is Mine" "no longer felt like a battle; it felt like closure," emphasizing the singers’ technical skill: "Brandy's technical precision paired beautifully with Monica's raw emotional delivery. Every note landed. Every harmony hit." Owen Myers of The Guardian offered a more mixed take on the November 20 concert at Barclays Center, describing it as a "sometimes strange, sometimes soaring throwback night." He noted that the rivalry-themed staging could feel like a "variety segment," with some songs cut to "90 seconds apiece." Myers praised the solo performances, highlighting Brandy's virtuosic vocals and Monica's "pristine" delivery, but criticized the lack of live instrumentation, "elaborate and strange video interludes," and a "slightly perplexing" lineup of guest appearances.

== Commercial performance ==
As the Black Promoters Collective announced in July 2025, the Boy is Mine Tour helped the company to reach more than $100 million in projected sales for the first half of 2025.

== Controversies ==
=== October 18 show incident ===
During the tour's October 18, 2025 stop at the United Center in Chicago, Brandy abruptly exited the stage in the middle of performing her song "Baby" and did not return for the remainder of the show, leaving Monica to complete the concert alone without their planned finale, including "The Boy Is Mine." Videos shared on social media showed Brandy saying, "Give me one second, y'all," before walking offstage, which led to visible confusion and disappointment among fans as the set concluded early. In a statement shared the following day on social media, Brandy explained that the exit was due to a health issue caused by dehydration and associated feelings of faintness, citing "weeks of nonstop rehearsals" as contributing factors and emphasizing that prioritizing her well‑being was "of the utmost importance." She wrote that she initially tried to return to the show but was unable to "fully connect sonically with the production," and expressed gratitude for Monica's professionalism in finishing the performance. Brandy also said she sought medical treatment after the incident and apologized to fans, thanking them for their understanding and support.

=== Supporting act replacements ===
For the October 25 and 26 concerts, Mya performed in place of Muni Long, who was absent due to personal health problems. On November 30, 2025, Long announced her departure from the tour, citing ongoing personal health reasons. Mya returned as a supporting act for the November 29 and 30 concerts; Keyshia Cole was named as a permanent replacement for Long, beginning December 4.

== Set list ==
This set list is from the concert in Cincinnati on October 16, 2025.

Act I – Brandy vs. Monica

1. "What About Us?"
2. "Knock Knock"
3. "I Wanna Be Down"
4. "Don't Take It Personal (Just One of Dem Days)"
5. "Best Friend"
6. "Like This and Like That"

Act II – Brandy

7. "I Thought"
8. "Full Moon"
9. "Right Here (Departed)"
10. "Who Is She 2 U"
11. "Afrodisiac"

Act III – Monica

12. "Street Symphony"
13. "Everytime tha Beat Drop"
14. "Lean wit It, Rock wit It" / "Take Me Thru Dere" / "I'm So ATL" (dance break)
15. "Get It Off"
16. "The First Night"

Act IV – Ballads

17. "It All Belongs to Me"
18. "Brokenhearted"
19. "Nothing"
20. "He Is"
21. "Put That on Everything"
22. "Trust"
23. "U Should've Known Better"
24. "Love All Over Me"
25. "Almost Doesn't Count"
26. "Why I Love You So Much"
27. "I Keep It to Myself"

Act V – Brandy vs. Monica Part II

28. "Talk About Our Love" / "Can You Hear Me Now?" / "Put It Down" (dance break)
29. "Baby"
30. "Sittin' Up in My Room"
31. "Top of the World"
32. "Before You Walk Out of My Life"
33. "So Gone"

Act VI – Angels

34. "Angel in Disguise"
35. "Angel of Mine"
36. "I Wanna Dance with Somebody (Who Loves Me)"
37. "Have You Ever?"
38. "For You I Will"
39. "The Boy Is Mine"

== Tour dates ==
List of 2025 concerts
Date (2025)	City	Country	Venue	Supporting acts
October 16	Cincinnati	United States	Heritage Bank Center	Muni Long; Jamal Roberts; Kelly Rowland
October 17	Milwaukee	United States	Fiserv Forum	Muni Long; Jamal Roberts; Kelly Rowland
October 18	Chicago	United States	United Center	Muni Long; Jamal Roberts; Kelly Rowland
October 19	Indianapolis	United States	Gainbridge Fieldhouse	Muni Long; Jamal Roberts; Kelly Rowland
October 24	Nashville	United States	Bridgestone Arena	Coco Jones; Muni Long; Jamal Roberts
October 25	Chicago	United States	Wintrust Arena	Coco Jones; Mya
October 26	Kansas City	United States	T-Mobile Center	Coco Jones; Mya
October 30	Memphis	United States	FedExForum	Muni Long; Jamal Roberts; Kelly Rowland
October 31	Atlanta	United States	State Farm Arena	Muni Long; Jamal Roberts; Kelly Rowland
November 1	Greensboro	United States	First Horizon Coliseum	Muni Long; Jamal Roberts; Kelly Rowland
November 2	Baltimore	United States	CFG Bank Arena	Muni Long; Jamal Roberts; Kelly Rowland
November 6	Inglewood (Note: Billed as Los Angeles in promotional material.)	United States	Kia Forum	Muni Long; Jamal Roberts; Kelly Rowland
November 7	Paradise (Note: Billed as Las Vegas in promotional material.)	United States	T-Mobile Arena	Muni Long; Jamal Roberts; Kelly Rowland
November 8	Oakland	United States	Oakland Arena	Muni Long; Jamal Roberts; Kelly Rowland
November 9	Inglewood	United States	Kia Forum	Muni Long; Jamal Roberts; Kelly Rowland
November 13	Charlotte	United States	Spectrum Center	Muni Long; Jamal Roberts; Kelly Rowland
November 14	Columbia	United States	Colonial Life Arena	Muni Long; Jamal Roberts; Kelly Rowland
November 15	Birmingham	United States	Legacy Arena	Muni Long; Jamal Roberts; Kelly Rowland
November 16	St. Louis	United States	Enterprise Center	Muni Long; Jamal Roberts; Kelly Rowland
November 20	New York City (Note: Billed as Brooklyn in promotional material.)	United States	Barclays Center	Muni Long; Jamal Roberts; Kelly Rowland
November 21	Newark	United States	Prudential Center	Muni Long; Jamal Roberts; Kelly Rowland
November 22	Atlantic City	United States	Jim Whelan Boardwalk Hall	Muni Long; Jamal Roberts; Kelly Rowland
November 23	Hampton	United States	Hampton Coliseum	Jamal Roberts; Kelly Rowland
November 29	Detroit	United States	Little Caesars Arena	Mya; Jamal Roberts; Kelly Rowland
November 30	Washington, D.C.	United States	Capital One Arena	Mya; Jamal Roberts; Kelly Rowland
December 4	Atlanta	United States	State Farm Arena	Keyshia Cole; Jamal Roberts; Kelly Rowland
December 5	New Orleans	United States	Smoothie King Center	Keyshia Cole; Jamal Roberts; Kelly Rowland
December 6	Fort Worth	United States	Dickies Arena	Keyshia Cole; Jamal Roberts; Kelly Rowland
December 7	Houston	United States	Toyota Center	Keyshia Cole; Jamal Roberts; Kelly Rowland
December 12	Tampa	United States	Benchmark International Arena	Keyshia Cole; Jamal Roberts; Kelly Rowland
December 13	Miami	United States	Kaseya Center	Keyshia Cole; Jamal Roberts; Kelly Rowland
December 14	Jacksonville	United States	VyStar Veterans Memorial Arena	Keyshia Cole; Jamal Roberts; Kelly Rowland
