= LaKiesha Berri =

American singer (born 1974)

- Born: 1974 (age 51–52); Cincinnati, Ohio, U.S.
- Genres: R&B
- Occupations: Singer, songwriter, rapper

LaKiesha Berri (born 1974, Cincinnati, Ohio) is an American R&B singer who scored a minor pop hit in 1997 in the U.S. and UK with "Like This and Like That" from The 6th Man soundtrack starring Marlon Wayans and Kadeem Hardison.

== Biography ==
Berri signed with Hollywood Records in the 1990s, with the release of her debut album Berri toured the UK and made appearances on such UK shows like The Big Breakfast and performed at PopKomm with the Foo Fighters and Beck in Germany. Her debut single became an underground hit with a remix of "Like This and Like That" featuring Grammy Award nominated rapper Erick Sermon. The single landed in the Top 10 of the British R&B chart. In the US the single sold over 185,000 units within its first nine weeks.

In 1998, Berri appeared on the Snake Eyes soundtrack which starred Nicolas Cage.

Her debut album, produced by Emosia, the man behind Blessid Union of Souls was released on January 1, 1998. That year she earned a Cammy Award (Cincinnati Entertainment Award) nomination for Best New Act.

Berri remains active musically as a backing vocalist for a list of R&B and pop acts, but has not scored a chart hit since the release of "Like This and Like That".

== Singles ==
Year	Title	Album	US	UK
1997	"Like This and Like That"	The 6th Man soundtrack	70	54
1997	"Now... Feel Me" (D'Meka featuring LaKiesha Berri)	Now... Feel Me	-	-
