= Let's Straighten It Out =

1974 single by Latimore

Single by Latimore

from the album More More More (1974) I'll Do Anything for You (1983)
- B-side: "Ain't Nobody Gonna Make Me Change My Mind" (1974 only)
- Released: 1974 (first version); 1983 (second version)
- Genre: R&B, blues (1974); Soul (1983)
- Length: 3:20 (1974); 5:32 (1983)
- Label: Glades (1974); Malaco (1983)
- Songwriter: Benny Latimore
- Producers: Steve Alaimo (1974); Tommy Couch, Wolf Stephenson (1983)

"Let's Straighten It Out"

Song by Monica featuring Usher

from the album Miss Thang
- Released: 1994
- Genre: R&B
- Length: 4:25 (Miss Thang version); 4:06 (Panther version)
- Songwriters: Benny Latimore, Dallas Austin
- Producer: Dallas Austin

"Let's Straighten It Out" is the name of a hit song by blues singer Latimore. The first version of the song appeared on his second album More, More, More, with a running time of 5:12. A single, beginning at 1:28 of the album version, was released with a running time of 3:20. The single was played back at a slightly higher speed when mastered, raising the pitch slightly from the album version. The single spent two weeks at number one on the R&B singles chart in November, 1974. It also peaked at number 31 on the Billboard Hot 100 singles chart. After signing with Malaco Records, Latimore would re-record the song in 1983 for his eighth album, I'll Do Anything For You, with a spoken introduction.

The single was covered by R&B singers Monica and Usher for the Panther soundtrack in 1995. In 1995 a longer version of the same recording appeared on Monica's debut album, Miss Thang. The song has also been covered by O.V. Wright (1978), Gwen McCrae (1978), B.B. King (1989), Millie Jackson (1994), Etta James (2002), Clarence Carter (2011), and Eli "Paperboy" Reed (2020). A sample-based version of the Gwen McCrae track was released as "Baltisoul" (2018) credited to Ks French.
