= Dance Vault Remixes: Get It Off/Knock Knock =

EP by Monica
- Released: January 1, 2004
- Recorded: 2003
- Genre: R&B; dance; hip-hop
- Label: J

Monica chronology
After the Storm (2003)	Dance Vault Remixes: Get It Off/Knock Knock (2004)	The Makings of Me (2006)

Dance Vault Remixes: Get It Off/Knock Knock is the first EP by American R&B singer Monica, released in 2004. It features remix versions of the 2003 songs "Knock Knock" and "Get It Off", both from After the Storm. Both songs were released as a double A-side single. It is her first EP or compilation of any type and was released for promotional use only.

During 2004, her record company, J Records, issued the six-track remix EP featuring productions by Kid Chris and Planet Funk Crew. It was released alongside the "Knock Knock"/"Get It Off" DVD single.

== Track listing ==
1. Get It Off (That Kid Chris Club Mix) - 8:15
2. Knock Knock (Planet Funk Club Mix) - 8:27
3. Get It Off (That Kid Chris Mixshow Edit) - 5:51
4. Get It Off (That Kid Chris Dub) - 8:56
5. Knock Knock (Planet Funk Dub Mix) - 8:36
6. Get It Off (That Kid Chris Radio Edit) - 4:03
