= Ain't Nobody (Monica song) =

Single by Monica featuring Treach (from Naughty by Nature)

from the album The Nutty Professor
- Released: May 21, 1996
- Recorded: 1995
- Genre: R&B; hip hop soul
- Length: 4:30 (album version); 4:06 (radio edit)
- Label: Def Jam; Rowdy; Arista
- Songwriters: Dallas Austin; Anthony Criss; Dale Warren
- Producer: Dallas Austin

Monica singles chronology
"Before You Walk Out of My Life/Like This and Like That" (1995)	"Why I Love You So Much" / "Ain't Nobody" (1996)	"For You I Will" (1997)

Naughty by Nature singles chronology
"Feel Me Flow/Hang Out and Hustle" (1995)	"Ain't Nobody" (1996)	"Mourn You Till I Join You" / "Nothing to Lose" (1997)

"Ain't Nobody" is an R&B/hip hop soul mid-tempo song produced by Dallas Austin for American R&B singer Monica. It was featured on the Nutty Professor official soundtrack, and also was released as Miss Thang's fourth and final single on a double A-side with "Why I Love You So Much" on May 20, 1996. The double-A-side single became Monica's fourth top ten hit on the U.S. Billboard Hot 100 (Consecutive), reaching number 9 and number 3 on the Hot R&B/Hip-Hop Singles & Tracks chart.

== Music video ==
The music video for "Ain't Nobody" was directed by David Nelson (known for his work for Donell Jones, Da Brat, 2Pac, R. Kelly and Nicole Wray) and was filmed in the Staten Island Ferry, in New York City. It also features scenes from the Nutty Professor movie, cut between Monica and Treach's scenes.

== Formats and track listings ==
These are the formats and track listings of major single-releases of "Ain't Nobody"

1. "Ain't Nobody" (Main Mix)
2. "Ain't Nobody" (No Rap)
3. "Ain't Nobody (Quiet Storm Mix)

== Charts ==
=== Weekly charts ===
Weekly chart performance for "Ain't Nobody"
Chart (1996)	Peak position
US Billboard Hot 100	9
US Dance Singles Sales (Billboard)	11
US Hot R&B/Hip-Hop Songs (Billboard)	3

=== Year-end charts ===
Year-end chart performance for "Ain't Nobody"
Chart (1996)	Position
US Billboard Hot 100	46
US Hot R&B/Hip-Hop Songs (Billboard)	11
