= Miss Thang =

Studio album by Monica
- Released: July 18, 1995
- Recorded: 1993–1995
- Genre: R&B
- Length: 69:33
- Labels: Rowdy; Arista
- Producers: Dallas Austin; Tim & Bob; Arnold Hennings; Daryl Simmons; Soulshock & Karlin; Colin Wolfe

Monica chronology
Miss Thang (1995)	The Boy Is Mine (1998)

Singles from Miss Thang
- 1. "Don't Take It Personal" Released: April 10, 1995; 2. "Before You Walk Out of My Life"/"Like This and Like That" Released: August 3, 1995; 3. "Why I Love You So Much" Released: May 21, 1996

Miss Thang is the debut studio album by American singer Monica. It was released by Rowdy Records and distributed through the Arista label on July 18, 1995, in the United States. Recorded throughout her early teenage years, the album was conceived under the guidance of Rowdy head Dallas Austin who would emerge as a tutor and father figure to Monica and serve as Miss Thang's sole executive producer. Austin recruited protégés from his DARP production camp such as Tim & Bob, Arnold Hennings, and Colin Wolfe as well as Daryl Simmons, and Soulshock & Karlin to work on the album. It incorporates a wide range of contemporary genres such as soul, pop, hip hop and blues.

Upon release, Miss Thang received generally mixed to positive reviews from music critics, who complimented Monica's versatility and mature sound appearance, as well as the album's eclectic number of songs. A steady seller, the album became a commercial success as well. It debuted and peaked at number 36 of the Billboard 200 and reached the top ten on the Top R&B/Hip-Hop Albums in the United States, where it was certified three-times Platinum by the Recording Industry Association of America (RIAA) and sold over 1.5 million copies. Internationally, it earned Gold status in Canada, where it reached number 20 on RPM's Top Albums/CDs chart, and peaked at number nine on the New Zealand Albums Chart, her highest peak as of 2018.

Four singles were released from the album, including debut single "Don't Take It Personal (Just One of Dem Days)" and follow-up "Before You Walk Out of My Life", both of which made Monica the youngest artist ever to have two consecutive chart-topping hits on the Billboard Hot R&B Singles chart and became top ten hits in New Zealand. With her further two singles, "Like This and Like That" and "Why I Love You So Much" also reaching the top three on the Hot R&B Songs, Monica, along with fellow teen singers Aaliyah and Brandy, established herself as one of the most successful R&B female vocalists to emerge during the mid-to late 1990s. It also earned her four Soul Train Music Awards nods as well as American Music Award and Billboard Music Award nominations each.

== Background and production ==
In 1992, after winning a series of local talent contests, Monica was introduced to music producer Dallas Austin. Impressed by her voice and persona after hearing her perform Whitney Houston's 1986 hit single "Greatest Love of All," Austin offered her a record deal with his Arista-distributed label Rowdy Records at the age of 12. A teacher and growing father figure, Austin became instrumental in tutoring the young singer, while executive producing her debut album under the Rowdy roster. A breakaway from regular teenage life, he would often pick her up after school and whisk her off to a music studio most evenings. Austin also consulted Flavor Unit, owned by rapper Queen Latifah, to serve as Monica's management and arranged recording sessions with his in-house protégés Arnold Hennings, Tim & Bob, and Colin Wolfe for her debut. In addition, Carsten Schack and Kenneth Karlin from Danish production duo Soulshock & Karlin would hand in their yet-unreleased song "Before You Walk Out of My Life," a leftover from Toni Braxton's second studio album Secrets (1996), for Monica to record.

With much of the album being recorded during her years of 1993 and 1995, her teenage years, and her voice changing during that time, some songs were recorded twice, while new material was added or remained unreleased. Monica has described the period as hard work: "It was more from the stress I put on myself than it was pressure from others," she said. "There were so many young artists releasing records, and I wanted to stand out. I was a regular female growing up in the inner city, and I wanted to be who I was." Throughout the recording process, she ensured the album's music and lyrical content reflected her persona. As a result, she vetoed some of the songs selected for the album. "I was very assertive in making sure the album was really me," she said in an interview with Billboard. "How can you show your feeling in a song when it's about something you don't know about?" Commenting on the album title, Monica later elaborated: “Dallas [Austin] would bring producers in the studio to play records for me and I’d be quick to say ‘No’ if I didn’t feel it. I knew who I was and what I wanted to say. That’s where Miss Thang came from. He’d say, ‘Miss Thang don’t like it!’."

== Promotion ==
The album was supported by four singles. Debut single "Don't Take It Personal (Just One of Dem Days)" reached number two on the US Billboard Hot 100 and became a top ten hit in Austria and New Zealand, where it ranks among Monica's highest-charting singles. Follow-up "Before You Walk Out of My Life," released on a double-A-side with "Like This and Like That" became a top ten hit in the US and, along with "Don't Take It Personal" made Monica, at the age of 14, the youngest recording artist to have two consecutive number-one hits on Billboard's Hot R&B Songs. Ballad "Why I Love You So Much," released together with "Ain't Nobody," a collaboration with Treach from American hip hop trio Naughty by Nature, recorded for the soundtrack of the 1996 motion picture The Nutty Professor, became another top ten entry in the year of 1996.

== Critical reception ==
Professional ratings
Review scores
Source	Rating
AllMusic	3/5 stars
Los Angeles Times	2/4 stars
NME	4/10
The Rolling Stone Album Guide	2.5/5 stars

Miss Thang received generally mixed to positive reviews from music critics. In his review for AllMusic, editor Craig Lytle wrote that "the album focuses on hip-hop and contemporary urban cuts, including a pair of R&B chart-toppers." He felt that "in spite of her youthful age, Monica conveys a surprisingly mature sound." Billboard complimented the album for its "strong, today-styled hip-hop and R&B melodies" and Monica's singing versatility. The magazine noted that the "clever production maintains set's overall high energy, while remaining secondary to singer's vocals – creating a youthful, but eclectic 16 tracks."

The Los Angeles Times writer Connie Johnson wrote that "fourteen-year-old Monica is the best teen singer to come along since, well, Brandy. While "Don't Take It Personal," an urban radio staple, only hints at her abilities, she tackles Latimore's old-school classic "Let's Straighten It Out" with all the clear-eyed assertiveness of an R&B veteran. Miss Thang indeed." Alan Jones from Music Week said it was a "strong album of Jill swing and soulful ballads which belie the 14-year-old's youth". He also felt that she sings "confidently and competently against a contemporary urban music soundscape provided by some of the genre's top musicians". The New York Times's Kevin Sack found that "producer Dallas Austin injected this debut album with plenty of attitude." Christian Hoard, writing for The Rolling Stone Album Guide, called Miss Thang "an assured, streetwise amalgam of soul, pop, hip-hop, and blues". While he found praise for the up-tempo songs on the album, Hoard was less impressed with "the record's many soppy, MOR ballads" such as "Before You Walk Out of My Life". In November 2017, Complex magazine ranked the album 23rd on its The 50 Best R&B Albums of the '90s listing. In his retrospective review, editor Justin Charity wrote that "at 15, Monica dropped a debut that's as tender-loving and mature as her R&B elders; though she's less funky than Janet Jackson, Monica stepped correct with New Jack confidence on Miss Thang."

== Commercial performance ==
Miss Thang debuted and peaked at number 36 on the US Billboard 200 with first week sales of 31,500 units sold. For the week ending on August 5, 1995, the album entered the Top R&B/Hip-Hop Albums chart at number 9. 25 weeks after it debuted it reached its peak at number 7 for the week ending on January 20, 1996. Towards the end of 1995 and 1996, Billboard ranked the album at number 65 and 22 respectively on its Top R&B/Hip-Hop Albums year-end chart. In January 2000, the album was certified triple platinum by the Recording Industry Association of America (RIAA) for shipments of 3 million copies. By March 2002, Miss Thang sold 1.35 million copies in the United States, In April 2012, Billboard reported that 1.5 million copies of the album had been sold by then.

In Canada, the album debuted on RPM's Top Albums/CDs chart at number 88, during the week ending on August 21, 1995. In its 5th week on the chart the album reached its peak at number 20, during the week of September 18, 1995. Overall, the album had spent a total of 23 consecutive weeks on the Top Albums/CDs chart. For shipments in excess of 50,000 copies, it earned a gold certification from Music Canada on April 12, 1996. Elsewhere, Miss Thang peaked at number 42 on the Dutch MegaCharts and number nine on the New Zealand Albums Chart, Monica's highest peak on the latter chart as of 2018. In addition, it reached number 24 on the UK R&B Albums chart, according to the Official Charts Company (OCC).

== Track listing ==
Miss Thang track listing
No.	Title	Writer(s)	Producer(s)	Length
1.	"Miss Thang"	Dallas Austin	Austin	3:52
2.	"Don't Take It Personal (Just One of Dem Days)"	Austin; Monica Arnold; Derrick Simmons; Willie James Baker; James Todd Smith; Quincy Jones III; Abrim Tilmon; Hank Shocklee; Eric Sadler; Carlton Ridenhour; James Brown; George Clinton	Austin	4:18
3.	"Like This and Like That" (featuring Mr. Malik)	Austin; Colin Wolfe; Gabriel Jackson	Austin; Wolfe	4:41
4.	"Get Down"	Tim Kelley; Bob Robinson	Tim & Bob	4:22
5.	"With You"	Kelley; Robinson	Tim & Bob	4:50
6.	"Skate"	Austin; Wolfe; Albert Hudson; Jonathan Meadows; Dave Roberson; Glenda Hudson; Gregory Greene; Terry Morgan; Theodore Dudley	Wolfe	4:26
7.	"Angel"	Arnold Hennings	Hennings	4:44
8.	"Woman in Me (Interlude)"	Kelley; Robinson	Tim & Bob	1:36
9.	"Tell Me If You Still Care"	James Harris III; Terry Lewis	Tim & Bob; Austin^{[a]}	4:45
10.	"Let's Straighten It Out" (featuring Usher)	Austin; Benny Latimore	Austin	4:25
11.	"Before You Walk Out of My Life"	Kenneth Karlin; Andrea Martin; Carsten Schack	Soulshock & Karlin	4:53
12.	"Now I'm Gone"	Kelley; Robinson	Tim & Bob	4:39
13.	"Why I Love You So Much"	Daryl Simmons	Simmons	4:30
14.	"Never Can Say Goodbye"	Hennings	Hennings	5:02
15.	"Don't Take It Personal (Just One of Dem Days)" (Remix)	Austin; Arnold; Simmons; Willie James Baker; David Townsend; David Conley; Derrick Culler	Austin	3:50
16.	"Forever Always"	Hennings	Hennings	4:40
Total length:				69:33

Japanese bonus tracks
No.	Title	Writer(s)	Producer(s)	Length
17.	"In Time"	Kelley; Robinson	Tim & Bob	4:35
Total length:				74:08

Notes

- ^{^[a]} signifies co-producer(s)

Sample credits

- "Don't Take It Personal (Just One of Dem Days)" contains elements of The Detroit Emeralds' 1973 "You're Gettin' a Little Too Smart", LL Cool J's 1993 "Back Seat (of My Jeep)" and Public Enemy's 1987 "Bring the Noise".
- "Like This and Like That" contains elements of Spoonie Gee's 1979 "Spoonin' Rap".
- "Skate" contains elements of One Way's 1982 "Cutie Pie".
- "Tell Me If You Still Care" is a cover version of S.O.S. Band's 1983 original recording.
- "Let's Straighten It Out" is a cover version of Benny Latimore's 1974 original recording.
- The remix of "Don't Take It Personal (Just One of Dem Days)" contains elements of Jermaine Jackson's 1989 "Don't Take It Personal".

== Credits and personnel ==
Credits for the liner notes adapted from Miss Thang.

Instruments and performances

- Colin Wolfe – bass guitar
- Kenneth Crouch – piano
- Derrick Edmondson – flute, saxophone, horn
- Tommy Martin – guitar
- Derek Organ – drums
- Sandy Lawrence – art direction
- Tim Kelley – producer, arranger, drum programming, keyboards,
- Bob Robinson – keyboard, producer
- Dallas Austin, Ron Gresham, Ron Gresham, Michael Patterson, Darin Prindle – mixing

Technical and production

- Debra Killings, Monica, Lysette Titi, Usher – background vocals
- Naim Ali, Dallas Austin, Caron Veazey – creative director
- Arvel McClinton III – programming

== Charts ==
=== Weekly charts ===
Weekly chart performance for Miss Thang
Chart (1995–1996)	Peak position
Australian Albums (ARIA)	125
Canada Top Albums/CDs (RPM)	20
Dutch Albums (Album Top 100)	42
New Zealand Albums (RMNZ)	9
UK R&B Albums (Official Charts)	24
US Billboard 200	36
US Top R&B/Hip-Hop Albums (Billboard)	7
US Cashbox Top 100 Albums	35

=== Year-end charts ===
Year-end chart performance for Miss Thang
Chart (1995)	Position
Canada Top Albums/CDs (RPM)	100
US Billboard 200	181
US Top R&B/Hip-Hop Albums (Billboard)	65
Chart (1996)	Position
US Billboard 200	84
US Top R&B/Hip-Hop Albums (Billboard)	22

== Certifications ==
Sales and certifications for Miss Thang
Region	Certification	Certified units/sales
Canada (Music Canada)	Gold	50,000^{^}
United States (RIAA)	3× Platinum	1,500,000
^{^} Shipments figures based on certification alone.
