= Why I Love You So Much =

Single by Monica

from the album Miss Thang
- Released: May 21, 1996
- Genre: R&B
- Length: 4:30
- Label: Rowdy; Arista
- Songwriter: Daryl Simmons
- Producer: Daryl Simmons

Monica singles chronology
"Before You Walk Out of My Life" / "Like This and Like That" (1995)	"Why I Love You So Much" / "Ain't Nobody" (1996)	"For You I Will" (1997)

Music video
- "Why I Love You So Much" on YouTube

"Why I Love You So Much" is a song by American R&B singer Monica. It was written and produced by Daryl Simmons and recorded for her debut studio album, Miss Thang (1995). A downtempo love song about a partner being loving and supportive, the tender R&B ballad has Monica singing over a warm bass and soaring keyboard chords. "Why I Love You So Much" was released as the album's fourth and final single on a double A-side with "Ain't Nobody" during the second quarter of 1996.

The song earned largely positive review from music critics. It became Monica's third consecutive top ten hit on the US Billboard Hot 100, reaching number nine, while also peaking at number three on the Hot R&B/Hip-Hop Songs chart. In July 1996, it was certified Gold by the Recording Industry Association of America (RIAA). Elsewhere, it peaked at number 22 on the New Zealand Singles Chart. A music video for "Why I Love You So Much," shot with Kevin Bray in San Francisco, was released in April 1996.

== Background ==
"Why I Love You So Much" was written and produced by Daryl Simmons. While not specifically written for Miss Thang (1995), the song was brought in by Dallas Austin to be recorded by Monica for her debut album. In 2016, Simmons commented on how "Why I Love You So Much" was recorded: "I [...] got a call from Dallas (Austin). His studio was next door. He said, “Hey man, you got a song for Monica?” I’m like, “Yeah, I think I got something.” He came over and I played him “Why I Love You So Much.” He said, “I love it. Can you cut it on her?” I said “Yeah,” and I cut that on Monica." Monica later revealed that due to her young age, she used her father as a point of reference while recording her vocals for the song.

== Critical reception ==
In a retrospective review of the song, Andrea Castillo from The Boombox wrote: "It was the perfect R&B sound of the time, which was a little mature for Monica at her age, but just a beautiful track." Her colleagues, Suzanne Biello and Elena Bergeron, cited the song among her favorite tracks on the album, with Bergeron commenting: "At the end of that one she was basically singing like Denise Lasalle but as a 15-year-old." In 2023, Singersroom editor Erica Henderson felt that "the track’s gentle piano melody and simple yet effective production allow Monica’s voice to take center stage, making for a powerful and emotional listening experience [...] The song’s timeless sentiment and beautiful execution have made it a classic of 90s R&B, and it remains a beloved track among Monica’s fans."

== Music video ==
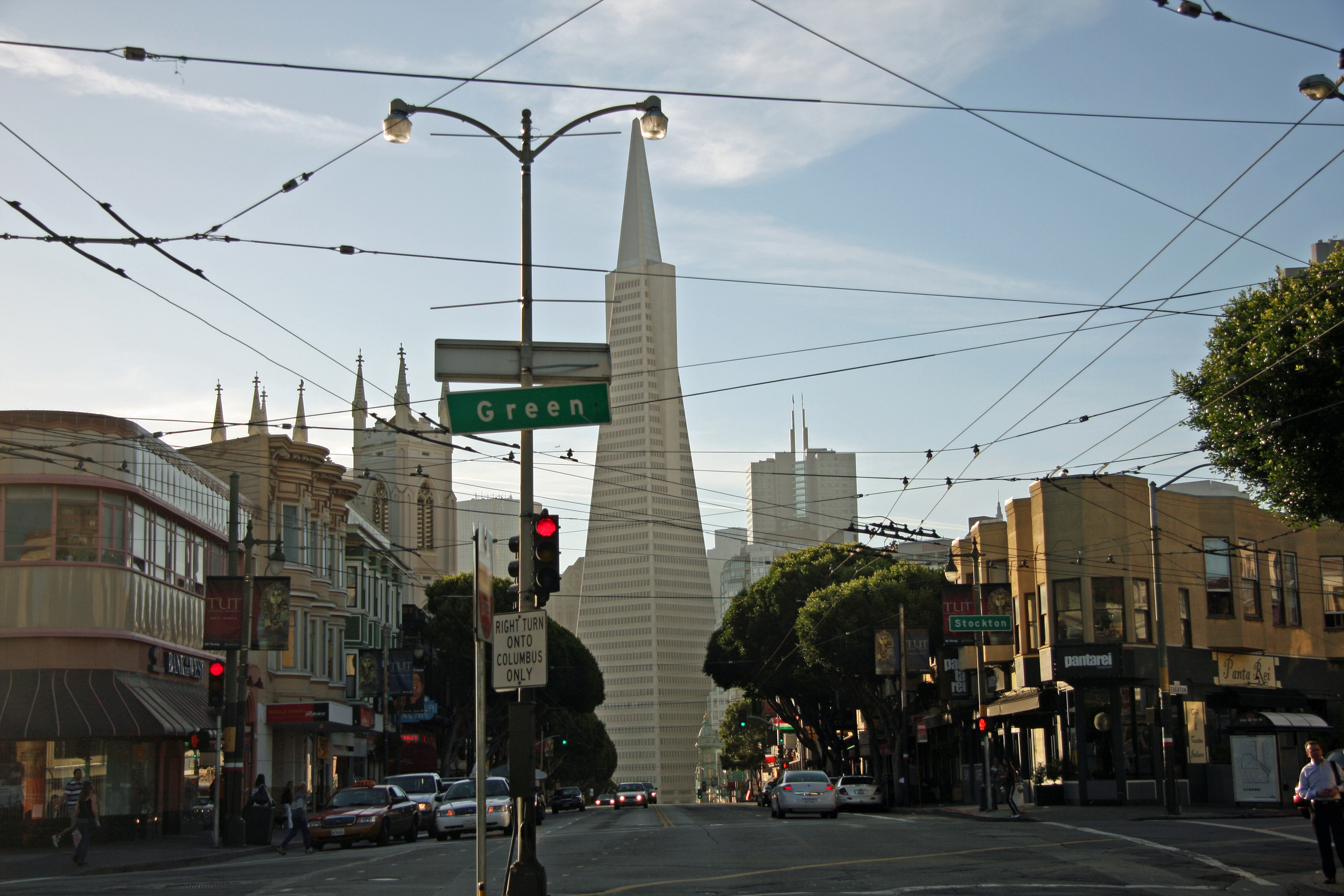
A music video for the song was filmed in San Francisco.

Monica reteamed with Kevin Bray, director of the video for her previous single "Before You Walk Out of My Life" (1995) to film the visuals for "Why I Love You So Much" in early 1996. Filming took place in various locations throughout San Francisco, particularly the North Beach neighborhood, including Italian shop Bohemian Cigar Store and Cafe on Columbus Avenue, where shots of Monica were filmed in the corner of the shop window. The video begins with clips of city streets and Monica walking a dalmatian. She sings as she hugs him against an all black background. The music video "Why I Love You So Much" premiered on video stations such as BET and The Box on the week ending April 14, 1996.

== Track listing ==
CD single
No.	Title	Writer(s)	Producer(s)	Length
1.	"Why I Love You So Much" (Album Version)	Daryl Simmons	Simmons	4:30
2.	"Why I Love You So Much" (Soulpower Remix)	Simmons	Simmons; Soulshock & Karlin^{[A]}	4:30
3.	"Ain't Nobody" (Main Mix featuring Naughty by Nature)	Dallas Austin; Anthony Criss; Dale Warren	Austin; KayGee^{[A]}	4:49
4.	"Ain't Nobody" (No Rap)	Austin; Criss; Warren	Austin; KayGee^{[A]}	4:49
5.	"Ain't Nobody" (Quiet Storm Mix)	Austin; Criss; Warren	Austin; KayGee^{[A]}	4:50

Notes

- ^{^[A]} denotes additional producer

Sample credits

- "Ain't Nobody contains portions from "Poverty's Paradise" as written by Dale Warren and performed by 24-Carat Black.

== Credits and personnel ==
Credits adapted from the liner notes of Miss Thang.

- Monica Arnold – lead vocals
- Dallas Austin – executive producer
- Ronnie Garrett – bass guitar
- Thom "T.K." Kidd – recording engineer
- Daryl Simmons – producer, writer
- Alvin Speights – mixing engineer
- José Rodriguez – mastering engineer

== Charts ==
=== Weekly charts ===
Weekly chart performance for "Why I Love You So Much"
Chart (1996)	Peak position
Australia (ARIA)	96
New Zealand (Recorded Music NZ)	22
US Billboard Hot 100	9
US Dance Singles Sales (Billboard)	11
US Hot R&B/Hip-Hop Songs (Billboard)	3
US Rhythmic Airplay (Billboard)	11
US Cash Box Top 100	6

=== Year-end charts ===
Year-end chart performance for "Why I Love You So Much"
Chart (1996)	Position
US Billboard Hot 100	46
US Hot R&B/Hip-Hop Songs (Billboard)	11
US Rhythmic (Billboard)	33

== Certifications ==
Certifications for "Why I Love You So Much"
Region	Certification	Certified units/sales
United States (RIAA)	Gold	700,000
