= The Nutty Professor (soundtrack) =

Soundtrack album by various artists
- Released: June 4, 1996
- Recorded: 1995–1996
- Genres: Hip hop; R&B
- Length: 55:13
- Label: Def Jam
- Producers: Brian Grazer (exec.); Harry Garfield (exec.); Lyor Cohen (exec.); Russell Simmons (exec.); Tina Davis (exec.); 4th Disciple; Babyface; Big Jaz; Cory Rooney; Dallas Austin; DeVante Swing; DJ Daryl; DR Period; Erick Sermon; James Earl Jones; Kenny Kornegay; Prince Markie Dee; Rashad Smith; Richie Rich; Warren G

Singles from The Nutty Professor
- 1. "Ain't No Nigga" Released: March 26, 1996; 2. "Ain't Nobody" Released: May 21, 1996; 3. "I Like" Released: June 11, 1996; 4. "Touch Me, Tease Me" Released: April 30, 1996; 5. "Last Night" Released: 1996

Professional ratings
Review scores
Source	Rating
AllMusic	4/5 stars
Los Angeles Times	3/4 stars
RapReviews	7/10

The Nutty Professor Soundtrack is the soundtrack to Tom Shadyac's 1996 comedy film The Nutty Professor. It was released in June 1996 via Def Jam Recordings, and contained hip hop and R&B music.

The album fared well on the Billboard charts, peaking at #8 on the Billboard 200 and #1 on the Top R&B/Hip-Hop Albums and featured several charting singles: "Ain't Nobody" by Monica featuring Treach of Naughty By Nature, "I Like" by Montell Jordan featuring Slick Rick, "Ain't No Nigga" by Jay-Z featuring Foxy Brown, "Touch Me, Tease Me" by Case featuring Mary J. Blige and Foxy Brown and "Last Night" by Az Yet all made it to the charts with "Last Night" making it to #9 on the Billboard Hot 100. The two tracks "Come Around" by Dos of Soul and "My Crew Can't Go For That" by Trigger tha Gambler featuring DV Alias Khrist and Smoothe da Hustler.

This is not actually the soundtrack to the film but 'music inspired by' the film, as stated on the reverse side of the CD. None of the 'Track listing' songs appeared in the music credits of the film. Songs from the film include the following: Macho Man, Super Bad, I Got You (I Feel Good), This Is How We Do It, Somethin' 4 da Honeyz, Emotionally in Love, Bounce 2 This (Montell Jordan), Close the Door, I'm So Excited, Boys Will Be Boys (Backstreet Boys), Homework, Sexy on a mutha Forget it, Strokin', In the Mood, Little Brown Jug, and Loving You.

== Track listing ==
No.	Title	Writer(s)	Producer	Length
1.	"Touch Me, Tease Me" (performed by Case, Foxy Brown and Mary J. Blige)	Case Woodard; Inga Marchand; Mary J. Blige; Kenny Kornegay; Darryl Young; Jesse Bonds Weaver Jr.	Kenny "K-Smoove" Kornegay; Darryl "88" Young^{[a]}	3:53
2.	"I Like" (performed by Montell Jordan and Slick Rick)	Montell Barnett; James Earl Jones; Harry Wayne Casey; Richard Finch	James Earl Jones; Derrick "D Man" McElveen^{[a]}	4:43
3.	"My Crew Can't Go for That" (performed by Trigga tha Gambler, D.V. Alias Khrist and Smoothe da Hustler)	Tawan Smith; Damon Smith; Kenneth Scranton; Darryl Pittman; Daryl Hall; John Oates; Sara Allen; Curtis Mayfield	DR Period; Low Mid^{[a]}	3:49
4.	"Ain't Nobody" (performed by Monica and Treach)	Anthony Criss; Dallas Austin; Dale Warren	Dallas Austin	4:47
5.	"Pillow" (performed by Richie Rich, D'wayne Wiggins and Rame Royal)	Richard Serrell; D'wayne Wiggins; Raymond Simmons; Raphael Wiggins; Timothy Christian Riley	DJ Daryl; Richie Rich	4:51
6.	"Last Night" (performed by Az Yet)	Keith Andes; Kenneth Edmonds	Babyface; Mervyn Warren^{[a]}	4:28
7.	"Come Around" (performed by Dõs of Soul)	Mark Morales; Mark C. Rooney	Prince Markie Dee; Cory Rooney	3:56
8.	"We Want Yo Hands Up" (performed by Warren G and Malik)	Warren Griffin III; Lamorris Edwards; Charlie Singleton; Kenton Nix; Larry Blackmon; Nathan Leftenant; Tomi Jenkins	Warren G	3:44
9.	"Ain't No Nigga" (performed by Jay-Z and Foxy Brown)	Shawn Carter; Marchand; Jonathan Burks; August Moon; Brian Potter; Dennis Lambert; Tyrone Thomas	Big Jaz	4:27
10.	"Breaker 1, Breaker 2" (performed by Def Squad)	Erick Sermon; Keith Murray; Reggie Noble	Erick Sermon	3:22
11.	"Doin' It Again" (performed by LL Cool J)	Anne Dudley; Gary Langan; J. J. Jeczalik; Le'Shaun Toureau; Paul Morley; Trevor Horn	Rashad Smith	4:00
12.	"Nasty Immigrants" (performed by 12 O'Clock and Raekwon)	Odion Turner; Corey Woods; Selwyn Bougard	4th Disciple	4:00
13.	"Love You Down" (performed by Da Bassment)	Melvin Riley	DeVante Swing	5:04
Total length:				55:13

Notes

- ^{^[a]} signifies a co-producer

== Charts ==
=== Weekly ===
Chart (1996)	Peak position
New Zealand Albums Chart	10
UK R&B Albums Chart	7
US Billboard 200	8
US Top R&B/Hip-Hop Albums (Billboard)	1

=== Year-end ===
Chart (1996)	Position
United States Albums Chart	74
United States R&B/Hip-Hop Albums Chart	18

== Certifications ==
Region	Certification	Certified units/sales
United States (RIAA)	Platinum	1,020,000

== See also ==
- List of Billboard number-one R&B albums of 1996
