= For You I Will (Monica song) =

1997 single by Monica

Single by Monica

from the album Space Jam: Music from and Inspired by the Motion Picture
- Released: January 14, 1997
- Studio: Chartmaker (Malibu, California); Record Plant (Los Angeles, California)
- Genre: Pop; R&B
- Length: 4:55 (album version); 4:10 (radio edit)
- Label: Atlantic; Rowdy
- Songwriter: Diane Warren
- Producer: David Foster

Monica singles chronology
"Why I Love You So Much" / "Ain't Nobody" (1996)	"For You I Will" (1997)	"The Boy Is Mine" (1998)

Space Jam singles chronology
"Space Jam" (1996)	"For You I Will" (1997)	"I Turn to You" (1997)

Music video
- "For You I Will" on YouTube

"For You I Will" is a song by American singer Monica. It was written by Diane Warren and produced by David Foster, and recorded for the soundtrack of the live-action/animated sports comedy film Space Jam (1996), directed by Joe Pytka and starring basketball player Michael Jordan and the Looney Tunes cast. One out of several songs from the album to be released as a single, it was sent to Top 40 radio on January 14, 1997 and issued on physical formats a month later on February 11, by Atlantic Records and Rowdy Records. A downtempo pop and R&B ballad, the song's lyrics involve the singer pledging love and devotion and promising to help an unnamed "you" overcome any difficulty, regardless of the magnitude.

The song debuted at an impressive number on the US Billboard Hot 100, peaking at number four, becoming Monica's second top five single and one of her highest-charting songs of the 1990s. It was eventually certified platinum by the Recording Industry Association of America (RIAA) on July 2, 1997, and ranked 13th on Billboard's Top Hot 100 Hits of 1997. Elsewhere, "For You I Will" reached the top five in the Netherlands, New Zealand, and on the Canadian Adult Contemporary chart. The first project to be recorded for her second album, it was later included on The Boy Is Mine (1998).

== Background and composition ==
"For You I Will" was written by Diane Warren and produced by David Foster. It was the first song to be recorded for Monica's second studio album The Boy Is Mine (1998). In a 2023 interview with The Hollywood Reporter, Monica called the song "a statement record for me. I had always expressed that, yes, I’m a young woman that’s from urban America that speaks to a very specific crowd at times, but I wanted to be clear that I’m not limited to one genre or the other [...] I didn’t want to separate it. I didn’t want to put limitations on myself, so I wanted to work with David Foster and Diane Warren. This was a direct request of mine because I wanted to show that these were also the types of records that I could absolutely perform." According to Monica, she had a walking pneumonia while recording "For You I Will," which she cited as a "testament to my dedication [and] versatility." Sheet music for "For You I Will" is in the key of B♭ major in common time with a slow tempo of 72 beats per minute. The key modulates to C major for the final chorus.

== Critical reception ==
"For You I Will" earned generally positive reviews from music critics some of which called it a departure from the R&B-directed nature of Monica's previous songs. Alan Jones from Music Week wrote, "It's one of those anthemic ballads that Warren has a knack for writing, building to a swayalong finale with Monica's inch-perfect R&B-inflected vocals proving a perfect foil." In a retrospective review of the song, Erica Henderson from Singersroom noted that "the song’s timeless melody and emotional depth have made it a beloved R&B classic that continues to be played and loved by fans. With its moving lyrics and powerful delivery, "For You I Will" remains one of Monica's most memorable and impactful tracks." In 2019, Vibe called "For You I Will" the standout track from Space Jam: Music from and Inspired by the Motion Picture. In 2023, Yardbarker's Mya Singleton ranked the song among Warren's best song, writing: "Monica’s contralto vocal tone is perfect for any Diane Warren ballad [...] On the track, Monica states her love and devotion for a partner, claiming she will do anything and be there for them through it all."

== Chart performance ==
The highest debut of the week, "For You I Will" opened at number nine on the US Billboard Hot 100 in the week of March 15, 1997. By April 5, 1997, it had sold 215,000 copies in the US, according to Nielsen Soundscan. On April 19, 1997, its sixth week on the chart, the song peaked at number four, eventually becoming Monica's second top five single after "Don't Take It Personal (Just One of Dem Days)" (1995) as well as one of her highest-charting songs of the 1990s. For shipments in excess of 1.0 million units, "For You I Will" was certified platinum by the Recording Industry Association of America (RIAA) on July 2, 1997, and ranked 13th on Billboard's Top Hot 100 Hits of 1997 listing. It also reached number two on the Hot R&B/Hip-Hop Songs chart and peaked at number three on both Billboard's Adult Contemporary and Rhythmic chart, respectively.

Elsewhere, "For You I Will" reached the top five in New Zealand, where it became her highest-charting single yet, reaching number two in its second week on the New Zealand Singles Chart on May 11, 1997. It also peaked at number three on the Dutch Top 40 Tipparade and at number four on the Canadian Adult Contemporary chart. In the United Kingdom, "For You I Will" spent two weeks on the UK Singles Chart, reaching number 27. It fared better on the UK Hip Hop/R&B chart, where it debuted and peaked at number seven on May 18, 1997.

== Music video ==
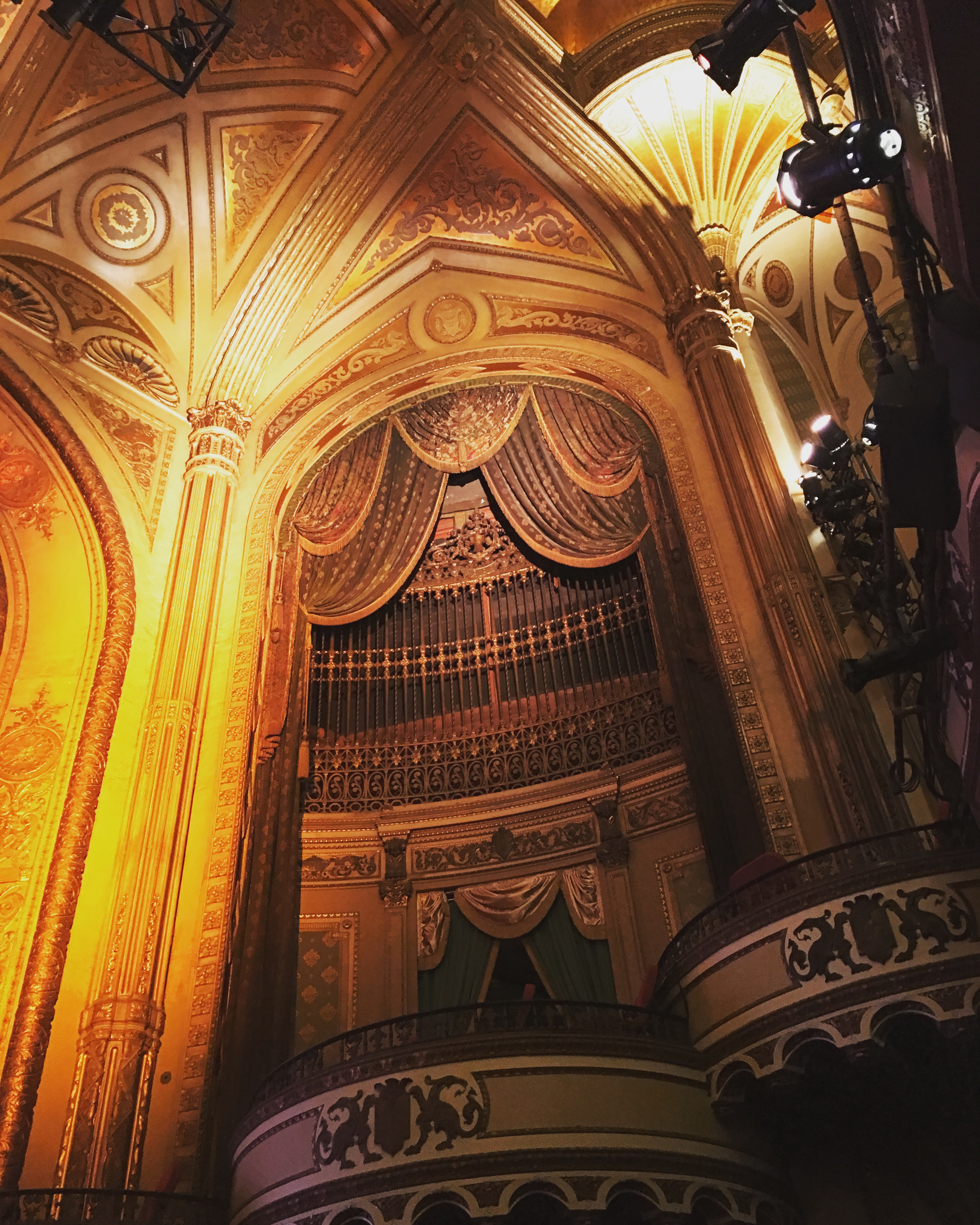
The music video for "For You I Will" was filmed at the Orpheum Theatre in Los Angeles (pictured).

A music video of "For You I Will" was directed by Francis Lawrence. Filming took place inside the Orpheum Theatre on Los Angeles Broadway. The visuals open in a closed theater with Monica singing as she walks through the lobby. She enters the theater where clips from Space Jam are shown.

== Track listing ==
All tracks written by Diane Warren and produced by David Foster.

US CD single
No.	Title	Length
1.	"For You I Will" (radio edit)	4:10
2.	"For You I Will" (instrumental)	4:53

== Personnel ==
Personnel are adapted from the liner notes of The Boy Is Mine.

- Monica Arnold – lead vocals
- Sue Ann Carwell – backing vocals
- Felipe Elgueta – engineering
- David Foster – arrangement, keyboards, production
- Simon Franglen – Synclavier programming
- Mick Guzauski – mixing
- Tim Lauber – recording assistance
- Jeff Pescetto – backing vocals
- Marnie Riley – mixing assistance
- Michael Thompson – guitar
- Diane Warren – writer

== Charts ==
=== Weekly charts ===
Weekly chart performance for "For You I Will"
Chart (1997)	Peak position
Australia (ARIA)	45
Canada Top Singles (RPM)	75
Canada Adult Contemporary (RPM)	4
Europe (Eurochart Hot 100)	86
Germany (GfK)	80
Netherlands (Dutch Top 40 Tipparade)	3
Netherlands (Single Top 100)	51
New Zealand (Recorded Music NZ)	2
Scottish Singles Sales (Official Charts)	78
UK Singles (Official Charts)	27
UK Hip Hop/R&B (Official Charts)	7
US Billboard Hot 100	4
US Adult Contemporary (Billboard)	3
US Adult Pop Airplay (Billboard)	31
US Hot R&B/Hip-Hop Songs (Billboard)	2
US Pop Airplay (Billboard)	6
US Rhythmic Airplay (Billboard)	3

=== Year-end charts ===
Year-end chart performance for "For You I Will"
Chart (1997)	Position
New Zealand (RIANZ)	45
US Billboard Hot 100	13
US Adult Contemporary (Billboard)	19
US Hot R&B Singles (Billboard)	14
US Top 40/Mainstream (Billboard)	28
US Rhythmic Top 40 (Billboard)	10

== Certifications ==
Certifications for "For You I Will"
Region	Certification	Certified units/sales
United States (RIAA)	Platinum	1,000,000^{^}
^{^} Shipments figures based on certification alone.

== Release history ==
Release dates and formats for "For You I Will"
Region	Date	Format(s)	Label(s)	Ref.
United States	January 14, 1997	Contemporary hit radio	Atlantic; Rowdy	
United States	February 11, 1997	CD; cassette	Atlantic; Rowdy	
