= Like This and Like That =

Single by Monica featuring Mr. Malik

from the album Miss Thang
- Released: November 22, 1995
- Length: 4:41
- Label: Rowdy; Arista
- Songwriters: Dallas Austin; Colin Wolfe; Malik Edwards
- Producers: Austin; Wolfe

Monica singles chronology
"Don't Take It Personal (Just One of Dem Days)" (1995)	"Before You Walk Out of My Life" / "Like This and Like That" (1995)	"Why I Love You So Much" / "Ain't Nobody" (1996)

Music video
- "Like This and Like That" on YouTube

"Like This and Like That" is a song by American singer Monica featuring rapper Mr. Malik. It was written by Dallas Austin, Colin Wolfe, and Malik, and produced by the former two. It was released as the second single along with "Before You Walk Out of My Life" from Monica's debut studio album, Miss Thang (1995). The song is built around a sample of "Spoonin' Rap" (1979) as performed by the Sugar Hill Gang and written by Gabriel Jackson. It peaked at numbers seven and eight on the US Billboard Hot 100 and Cash Box Top 100 charts.

== Background ==
"Like This and Like That" was written by Dallas Austin, Colin Wolfe, and Mr. Malik, while production on the track was overseen by Austin and Wolfe. The song contains a sample of the record "Spoonin' Rap" (1979) as written by Gabriel Jackson and performed by the Sugar Hill Gang. Mr. Malik from former rap duo Illegal performs several ad-libs and sings part of the bridge of "Like This and Like That," earning him a place as a featured artist on the track.

== Music video ==
A music video for "Like This and Like That" was directed by Keith Ward and filmed in New York City. Music website The Boombox described the visuals as an "indirect ode to the supermodel era, or, more appropriately, the glamorous life [...] it was as though Monica was battling two worlds. On the one hand, she's the high-flying artist on fancy sets and photo shoots, adorned in lavish outfits, on the other, she's completely dressed-down, going home to a regular life—explaining to her boyfriend that she’s a vulnerable young lady who deserves the sanctuary of a secure relationship."

== Track listing ==
CD single
No.	Title	Producer(s)	Length
1.	"Like This and Like That" (Radio Edit)	Dallas Austin	3:59
2.	"Like This and Like That" (Album Version)	Austin	4:41
3.	"Like This and Like That" (Instrumental)	Austin	4:41
4.	"Like This and Like That" (Acappella)	Austin	4:38

Remix single
No.	Title	Producer(s)	Length
1.	"Like This and Like That" (All Star Mix, featuring Mobb Deep)	Austin; Allen "All Star" Gordon^{[A]}	4:35
2.	"Like This and Like That" (K.O. Mix, featuring C-Knowledge)	Austin; Brian O.^{[A]}; Khalid K.^{[A]}	4:28
3.	"Like This and Like That" (Buckle Head Dance Mix)	Austin; Joey Alfred^{[A]}; Kevin Cornish^{[A]}; DJ Sean Jodi Diaz^{[A]}	5:11
4.	"Like That" (Soul Company Dirty Dubb)	Austin; Alfred^{[A]}; Cornish^{[A]}; Diaz^{[A]}	6:06

== Credits and personnel ==
Credits lifted from the album's liner notes.

- Monica Arnold – vocals
- Dallas Austin – production, writing
- Leslie Brathwaite – recording
- Debra Killings – backing vocals
- Mr. Malik – vocals
- Kevin Parker – mixing assistance, recording
- Rick Sheppard – programming
- Brian Smith – recording assistance
- Alvin Speights – mixing
- Colin Wolfe – bass, production, writing

== Charts ==
=== Weekly charts ===
Weekly chart performance for "Like This and Like That"
Chart (1996)	Peak position
Netherlands (Dutch Single Tip)	12
New Zealand (Recorded Music NZ)	18
UK Singles (Official Charts)	33
UK Club Chart (Music Week)	66
UK Hip Hop/R&B (Official Charts)	5
US Billboard Hot 100	7
US Dance Singles Sales (Billboard)	8
US Hot R&B/Hip-Hop Songs (Billboard)	1
US Cash Box Top 100	8

=== Year-end charts ===
Year-end chart performance for "Like This and Like That"
Chart (1996)	Position
US Billboard Hot 100	38
US Hot R&B/Hip-Hop Songs (Billboard)	9

== See also ==
- R&B number-one hits of 1996 (USA)
