= Before You Walk Out of My Life =

1995 single by Monica

Single by Monica

from the album Miss Thang
- Released: August 3, 1995
- Genre: R&B
- Length: 4:53 (album version); 3:59 (radio edit)
- Label: Rowdy; Arista
- Songwriters: Andrea Martin; Carsten Schack; Kenneth Karlin
- Producer: Soulshock & Karlin

Monica singles chronology
"Don't Take It Personal (Just One of Dem Days)" (1995)	"Before You Walk Out of My Life" / "Like This and Like That" (1995)	"Why I Love You So Much"/"Ain't Nobody" (1996)

Music video
- "Before You Walk Out of My Life" on YouTube

"Before You Walk Out of My Life" is a song by American R&B singer Monica. It was written by Andrea Martin, Carsten Schack, and Kenneth Karlin, with production helmed by Schack and Karlin under their production moniker Soulshock & Karlin. Initially helmed for fellow R&B singer Toni Braxton's Secrets (1996) album, it was left unused and later re-recorded by Monica for her debut album, Miss Thang (1995). Built around drum machine-backed rhythms and a saxophone-laced beat, the mid-tempo R&B ballad was released as the album's second single on August 3, 1995, with "Like This and Like That" serving as its other half on a double A-side stateside. It is considered to be one of her signature songs.

In the United States, "Before You Walk Out of My Life" became Monica's second number-one hit on the Billboard Hot R&B Singles chart, spending two weeks at number-one. It also reached the top ten on both the Billboard Hot 100 and Cash Box Top 100 charts, the New Zealand Singles Chart, and the UK R&B chart. Additionally, the song was ranked number thirty-eight on the 1996 Billboard year-end chart and certified platinum by the Recording Industry Association of America (RIAA). "Before You Walk Out of My Life," alongside previous single "Don't Take It Personal (Just One of Dem Days)," made the singer the youngest recording artist to have two consecutive number-one hits on Billboard's R&B chart at the age of fourteen.

== Background and recording ==
"Before You Walk Out of My Life" was written by American singer Andrea Martin along with Carsten Schack and Kenneth Karlin from Danish production team Soulshock & Karlin. The song was originally crafted for Toni Braxton's second studio album Secrets (1996), but later offered to Monica when Arista Records president Clive Davis demanded the song to be recorded by his protégé. In a 2020 interview, Schack commented on the sound of the song: "[Davis] was testing us [...] We were really dirty on the beats like on “Before You Walk Out Of My Life” by Monica and then Karlin would play really poppy type of chords. No one was doing that and it may be because of our upbringing in Denmark."

A mid-tempo R&B ballad with drum machine-backed rhythms and a saxophone-laced beat, the song was recorded by Jay Lean, Brian Smith, and Schack at the Pure Studio and the D.A.R.P. Studios in Atlanta, Georgia. Mixing of "Before You Walk Out of My Life" was overseen by Jon Gass at The Enterprise Studios. Dallas Austin served as executive producer on the track. Schack further commented on the recording sessions: "[Monica] was amazing. Her voice was so raw and her gospel runs were incredible. We loved that it had that street vibe. We walked out and we just knew it. We sent it to Clive and he didn't change anything. It came out and we had a number one record."

== Critical reception ==
"Before You Walk Out of My Life" earned generally favorable reviews upon its release and has since been considered to be one of Monica's signature songs. Music Week rated the song four out of five, adding, "This 15 year old from the Whitney and Brandy school of crooning turns in an ultra-smooth, ultra appealing R&B ballad which has been top three in the US." Tony Farside from the magazine's RM Dance Update gave it five out of five, calling it "one of the best new r&b tracks around for a while." He described the song as "a mid to low tempo smoocher with an acappella-ish intro and a lazy beat", and concluded, "A grower and definitely another hit waiting to happen for Monica." Another editor, James Hamilton deemed it a "sultry" and "attractive" R&B ballad. Christian Hoard from The Rolling Stone Album Guide called the song a "soppy MOR ballad" that was not playing "to her strengths."

In a retrospective review of the song, Singersroom editor Erica Henderson felt that "the track features a heartfelt vocal performance from Monica, as she pleads with her lover not to leave her. The song's catchy melody and relatable lyrics made it an instant hit, with its memorable chorus and powerful vocals [...] "Before You Walk Out of My Life" continues to be a standout moment in Monica's discography." Grant Rindner from Oprah Daily described the record as "another simmering love song dressed up like a mellow rap record filled with DJ scratches." Park Jin-young called the "perfectly written" and further noted: "It was my ultimate role model as songwriting: a song with a strong beat that was good enough as a ballad." During her Verzuz battle with Brandy in August 2020, Monica cited the song as "one of her favorites to sing to this day."

== Chart performance ==
In the United States, "Before You Walk Out of My Life" debuted at number 11 on the Billboard Hot R&B/Hip-Hop Songs in the week of October 21, 1995. It would eventually become Monica's second number-one hit on the chart when it – after recording-breaking 25 weeks – took the top spot of the chart in January 1996. The song would spend one further week at number-one. "Before You Walk Out of My Life," alongside previous single "Don't Take It Personal (Just One of Dem Days)" (1995), made Monica the youngest recording artist to have two consecutive number-one hits on Billboard's R&B chart at the age of fourteen. Billboard later ranked it ninth on its 1996 Hot R&B/Hip-Hop Songs year-end chart.

Elsewhere, the song reached numbers seven and eight on the US Billboard Hot 100 and Cash Box Top 100 charts, as well as the top 10 of the Maxi-Singles Sales and the Top 40/Rhythm-Crossover chart. It also peaked at number eight on the New Zealand Singles Chart, becoming Monica's second consecutive top-10 single there, and would become her highest-charting single from the Miss Thang era in the United Kingdom, peaking at number 22 on the UK Singles Chart, while also reaching number three of the UK R&B Chart and number six on the UK Dance Chart. In the United States, "Before You Walk Out of My Life" reached gold status on January 11, 1996. For shipments figures in excess of one million units, it was eventually certified platinum by the Recording Industry Association of America (RIAA) on March 19, 1996. Billboard ranked the song 38th on the 1996 Hot 100 year-end chart.

== Music video ==
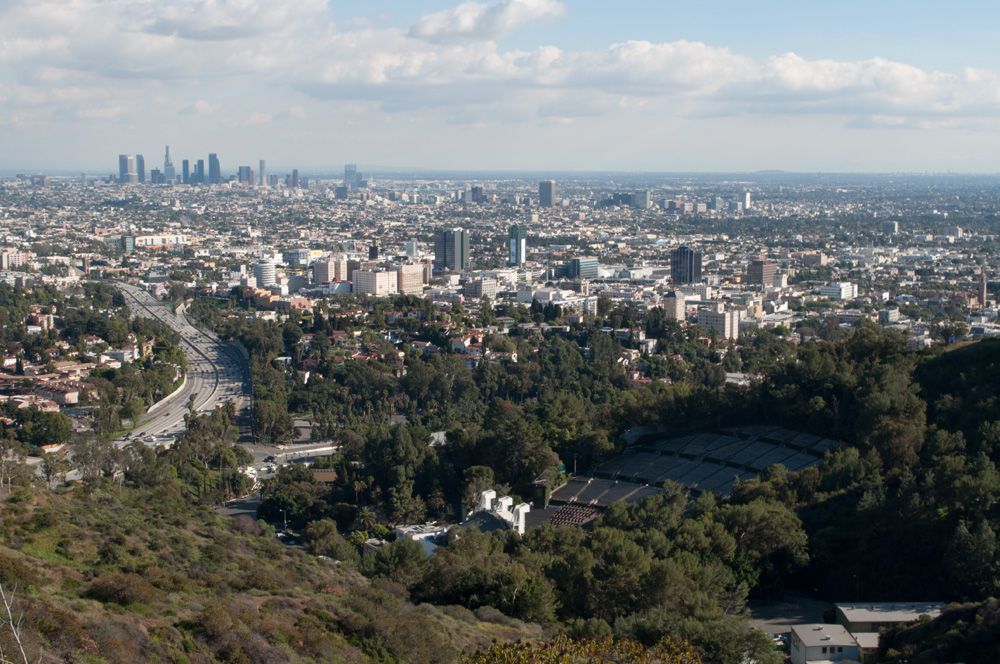
The music video for the song was filmed in Los Angeles.

An accompanying music video for "Before You Walk Out of My Life" was directed by Kevin Bray and filmed in Los Angeles, California. It begins with Monica sitting on the sidewalk and later on a roof. A man walks away from her and she looks in his direction sadly. Edited by Scott C. Wilson, it was released in October 1995.

In the 2010s, Monica became meme fodder after being teased for the "now infamous, old-school" shoes she wore in a scene in the video. A pair of what was described as "low-heeled white sandals with wide white straps across her feet, and a chunky square heel," Monica was filmed wearing them while sitting on a curb. During her Verzuz battle with Brandy in August 2020, she jokingly commented: "I think whoever made them knew that they should go away. I never found the shoes." On April 27, 2021, Monica shared a TikTok video shared on Instagram account in which she put on a pair of white open-toe kitten heels that resembled the sandals.

== Track listing ==
UK CD Single

No.	Title	Writer(s)	Producer(s)	Length
1.	"Before You Walk Out of My Life" (Radio Edit)	Andrea Martin; Carsten Schack; Kenneth Karlin	Soulshock & Karlin	3:58
2.	"Before You Walk Out of My Life" (Pete Rock Remix)	Martin; Schack; Karlin	Soulshock & Karlin; Pete Rock^{[A]}	4:56
3.	"Before You Walk Out of My Life" (Tony Rich Remix)	Martin; Schack; Karlin	Soulshock & Karlin; Tony Rich^{[A]}	4:57
4.	"Before You Walk Out of My Life" (Mike Dean Remix)	Martin; Schack; Karlin	Soulshock & Karlin; Mike Dean^{[A]}	4:55

US CD Single

No.	Title	Writer(s)	Producer(s)	Length
1.	"Before You Walk Out of My Life" (Album Version)	Martin; Schack; Karlin	Soulshock & Karlin	4:51
2.	"Like This and Like That" (Album Version)	Dallas Austin; Colin Wolfe; Malik Edwards	Austin; Wolfe	4:41
3.	"Before You Walk Out of My Life" (Mike Dean Remix)	Martin; Schack; Karlin	Soulshock & Karlin; Dean^{[A]}	4:54
4.	"Like This and Like That" (All Star Mix)	Austin; Wolfe; Edwards	Austin; Wolfe; Allstar^{[A]}	4:34
5.	"Before You Walk Out of My Life" (Pete Rock Remix)	Martin; Schack; Karlin	Soulshock & Karlin; Rock^{[A]}	4:56

Notes

- ^{^[A]} denotes additional producer

== Credits and personnel ==
Personnel are adapted from the liner notes of Miss Thang.

- Monica Arnold – vocals
- Dallas Austin – executive production
- Jon Gass – mixing engineer
- Jay Lean – recording engineer
- Andrea Martin – background vocals, writing
- Kenneth Karlin – production, writing
- Carsten Schack – production, recording engineer, writing
- Brian Smith – recording engineer

== Charts ==
=== Weekly charts ===
Weekly chart performance for "Before You Walk Out of My Life"
Chart (1995–1996)	Peak position
Australia (ARIA)	60
New Zealand (Recorded Music NZ)	8
Scottish Singles Sales (Official Charts)	78
UK Singles (Official Charts)	22
UK Dance (Official Charts)	6
UK Hip Hop/R&B (Official Charts)	3
US Billboard Hot 100 with "Like This and Like That"	7
US Dance Singles Sales (Billboard) with "Like This and Like That"	8
US Hot R&B/Hip-Hop Songs (Billboard) with "Like This and Like That"	1
US Pop Airplay (Billboard)	30
US Rhythmic Airplay (Billboard)	6
US Cash Box Top 100	8

=== Year-end charts ===
Year-end chart performance for "Before You Walk Out of My Life"
Chart (1996)	Position
US Billboard Hot 100	38
US Hot R&B Singles (Billboard)	9
US Top 40/Rhythm-Crossover (Billboard)	21

== Certifications ==
Certifications for "Before You Walk Out of My Life"
Region	Certification	Certified units/sales
New Zealand (RMNZ)	Platinum	30,000^{‡}
United States (RIAA)	Platinum	1,000,000^{^}
^{^} Shipments figures based on certification alone.^{‡} Sales+streaming figures based on certification alone.

== Release history ==
Release dates and formats for "Before You Walk Out of My Life"
Region	Date	Format(s)	Label(s)	Ref.
United States	August 3, 1995	—N/a	Rowdy	
Japan	April 24, 1996	CD	Rowdy; Arista; BMG	
United Kingdom	May 27, 1996	12-inch vinyl; CD; cassette	Rowdy; Arista; BMG	

== See also ==
- R&B number-one hits of 1996 (USA)
