= Don't Take It Personal (Just One of Dem Days) =

1995 single by Monica

Single by Monica

from the album Miss Thang
- Released: April 7, 1995
- Length: 4:18 (album version); 4:20 (radio edit)
- Label: Rowdy; Arista
- Songwriters: Dallas Austin; Derrick Simmons; Jabir Rasool, formerly known as Wil Baker
- Producer: Dallas Austin

Monica singles chronology
"Don't Take It Personal (Just One of Dem Days)" (1995)	"Before You Walk Out of My Life"\"Like This and Like That" (1995)

Music video
- "Don't Take It Personal (Just One of Dem Days)" on YouTube

"Don't Take It Personal (Just One of Dem Days)" is a song by American singer Monica. It was written by Dallas Austin, Derrick Simmons, and Recall Management for her debut album, Miss Thang (1995), while production was helmed by the former. The song contains a sample from "Back Seat (Of My Jeep)" (1993) by American rapper LL Cool J, which itself samples elements from the song "You're Gettin' a Little Too Smart" (1973), written by Abrim Tilmon and recorded by R&B vocal group The Detroit Emeralds. Due to the inclusion of the samples, several other writers are credited as songwriters.

The song was released as Monica's debut single in early 1995 by Rowdy and Arista and its music video was directed by Rich Murray. A major success, the single sold 1.2 million copies domestically, going platinum in the United States, where it spent two weeks at number-one on the US Billboard Hot R&B Songs chart, and peaked at number two for three non consecutive weeks on the Billboard Hot 100. "Don't Take It Personal (Just One of Dem Days)" also reached the top ten in Australia and New Zealand, where it was certified gold and platinum, respectively. The song, alongside follow-up single "Before You Walk Out of My Life," made Monica the youngest recording artist to have two consecutive number-one hits on the Billboard R&B chart at the age of fourteen.

== Composition ==
"Don't Take It Personal (Just One of Dem Days)" is a mid-tempo song lasting four minutes and eighteen seconds, while drawing influence from hip hop and R&B music genres. Written by Dallas Austin, Recall Management, and Derrick Simmons, and produced by the former, the song samples from "Back Seat (Of My Jeep)" (1993) by American rapper LL Cool J, which itself samples elements from the song "You're Gettin' a Little Too Smart" (1973) by R&B vocal group The Detroit Emeralds. When asked about the development of the song, Austin elaborated: "When I did [it], I got her. I understood her attitude and I thought 'this is where we have to take her for the records' [...] I then took 'Don't Take It Personal' to play for Clive Davis, and he says, 'Well I don't know... it needs a bridge.' And I said, 'No, it doesn't (because of the style).' And he says, 'I don't understand why [the lyrics] say "Dem Days" instead of "Those Days"' (laughs). But I said 'That's not what we say in the environment. We say it's one of "dem days."'"

== Critical reception ==
Steve Baltin from Cash Box wrote, "There's very little attitude on this highly warm and accessible track. Technically, this is not an overly impressive single, but that doesn't matter as most listeners aren't seeking virtuosity, especially this time of year. With the weather getting warmer, these are the songs fans want—and Monica has delivered with the first hit of the summer of ’95." In his weekly UK chart commentary in Dotmusic, James Masterton described it as "a very radio-friendly summer groove". Taylor Parkes from Melody Maker felt it "is the kind of smooth, sunbaked swingbeat I could listen to all day." Dele Fadele from NME wrote, "A catchy debut [...] who will not trouble Aretha Franklin in the wailing or heart-tugging stakes. It's kinda high-school swingbeat, with the hint of a woman, wise before her time. She just wants to be alone today, she tells an errant boyfriend, don't take it personally. However, this little slice-of-life then gets boosted with truck-shaking bass and a careful keyboard lick, whilst an echoey voice repeats "ghetto" throughout the track, and you have one of those summer songs that won't leave you alone, even if it gets a tad repetitive by the last minute." Ralph Tee from Music Week's RM Dance Update noted, "The label is a new urban soul offshoot for Arista in New York and Monica is a swing diva who debuts with an earthy two-stepper with 'live crowd' effects accompanying a phat bassline and all the appropriate snare and synth sounds. It's all written by Dallas Austin who warms things up nicely for the upcoming album Miss Thang. The track also contains a evident [sic] in the cut, which pumps along nicely."

== Commercial performance ==
"Don't Take It Personal (Just One of Dem Days)" was released as the album's lead single in the United States in early 1995. It sold 1.2 million copies domestically and earned a platinum certification from the Recording Industry Association of America (RIAA) on July 16, 1995. The song spent two weeks at number-one on the US Billboard Hot R&B Songs chart and peaked at number two for three non consecutive weeks on the Billboard Hot 100. It also reached the top of Billboard's Hot R&B/Hip-Hop Songs Sales chart and the Rhythmic chart and peaked number two on the Dance Singles Sales chart. "Don't Take It Personal (Just One of Dem Days)," alongside follow-up single "Before You Walk Out of My Life," would make the singer the youngest recording artist to have two consecutive number-one hits on the Billboard R&B chart at the age of fourteen.

Elsewhere, "Don't Take It Personal (Just One of Dem Days)" reached the top ten of the singles charts in Australia and New Zealand, where it was certified gold by the Australian Recording Industry Association (ARIA) and platinum by Recorded Music NZ, and peaked at number five and number seven, respectively. It also entered the top 20 of the Dutch Single Top 100. In the United Kingdom, "Don't Take It Personal (Just One of Dem Days)" spent four weeks on the UK Singles Chart, reaching number 32. It fared better on the UK Hip Hop/R&B chart, where it peaked at number six in the week of July 23, 1995. The song also reached the top 20 on a composite European Dance Radio Chart.

== Music video ==
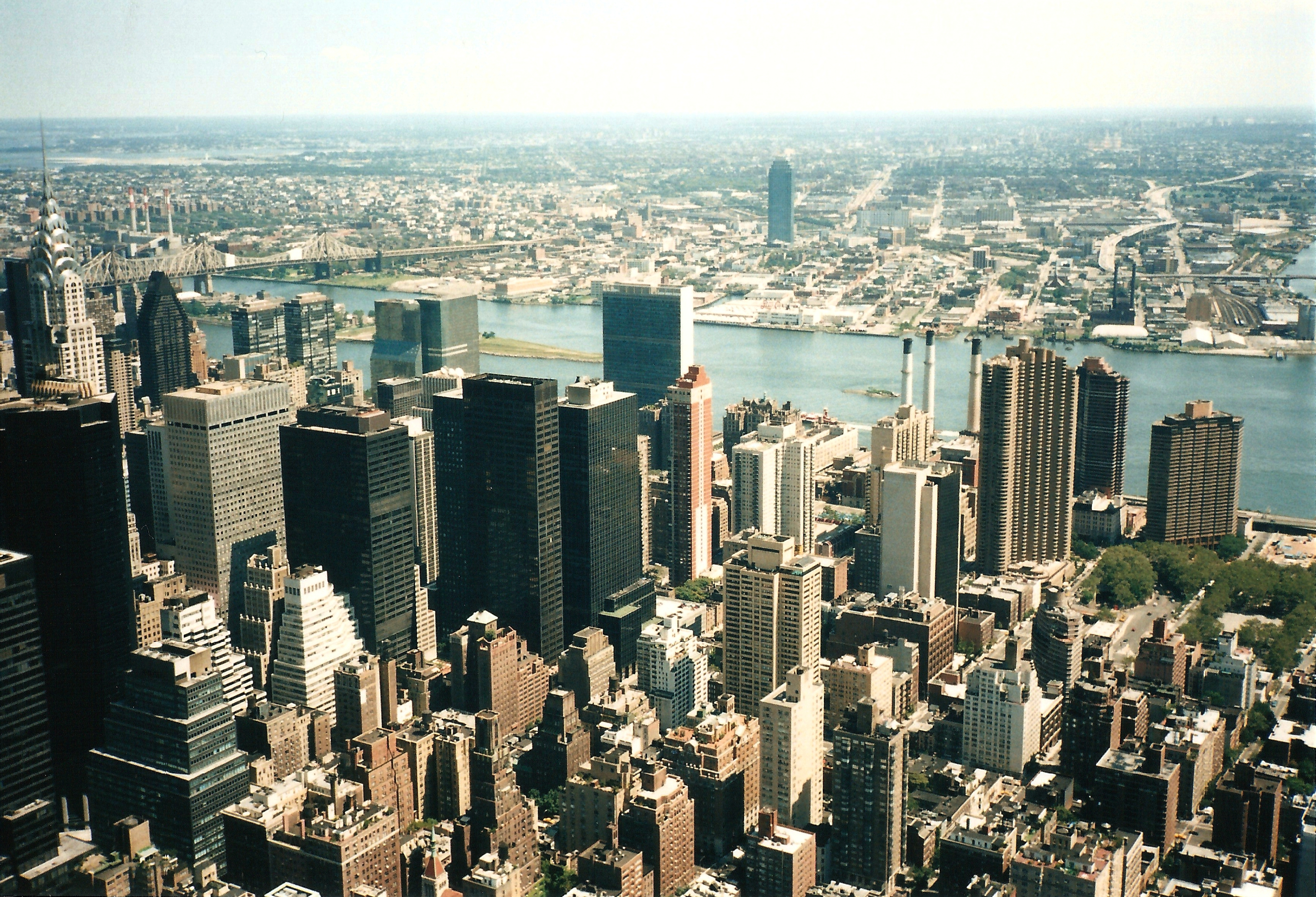
A music video for the song was filmed in New York City.

An accompanying music video for "Don't Take It Personal (Just One of Dem Days)", shot in black-and-white, was directed by Rich Murray. It was the third video to be filmed after the first one, filmed on top of a Checkers drive-thru restaurant at the National Highway in College Park, was disliked, and a second video was deemed inappropriate after Monica, unaware of the consequences for her promotional material that had already been photographed, had her hair changed from black bob cut to blonde pixie cut just a short time after filming the then-unreleased visuals. Murray's version was eventually filmed in New York City, where Daniel Hastings shot the artwork for parent album Miss Thang the same week.

"Don't Take It Personal (Just One of Dem Days)" was sent to video stations like BET and local stations on February 21, 1995. It received nominations for Best R&B/Urban Clip and Best New R&B/Urban Artist Clip at the 1995 Billboard Music Video Awards.

== Track listings ==
All track written by Dallas Austin, Derrick Simmons, and Recall Management, with production helmed by the former.

US CD single
No.	Title	Length
1.	"Don't Take It Personal (Just One of Dem Days)" (mainstream radio version)	4:05
2.	"Don't Take It Personal (Just One of Dem Days)" (radio edit)	4:20
3.	"Don't Take It Personal (Just One of Dem Days)" (album version)	4:17
4.	"Don't Take It Personal (Just One of Dem Days)" (instrumental)	3:58
5.	"Don't Take It Personal (Just One of Dem Days)" (acappella)	4:40

7-inch single
No.	Title	Length
1.	"Don't Take It Personal (Just One of Dem Days)" (radio edit)	4:20
2.	"Don't Take It Personal (Just One of Dem Days)" (album version)	4:17
3.	"Don't Take It Personal (Just One of Dem Days)" (instrumental)	3:58
4.	"Don't Take It Personal (Just One of Dem Days)" (acappella)	4:40

== Credits and personnel ==
Credits are lifted from the album's liner notes.

- Monica Arnold – lead vocals
- Dallas Austin – instruments, producer, writer
- Willie James Baker – writer (sample)
- Leslie Brathwaite – engineering, mixing
- James Brown – writer (sample)
- George Clinton – writer (sample)
- Quincy Jones III – writer (sample)
- Debra Killings – backing vocals
- Recall Management – writer
- Carlton Ridenhour – writer (sample)
- Hank Shocklee – writer (sample)
- Eric Sadler – writer (sample)
- James Todd Smith – writer (sample)
- Derrick Simmons – writer
- Abrim Tilmon, Jr. – writer (sample)

== Charts ==
=== Weekly charts ===
Weekly chart performance for "Don't Take It Personal (Just One of Dem Days)"
Chart (1995–1996)	Peak position
Australia (ARIA)	7
Europe (Eurochart Hot 100)	99
Europe (European Dance Radio)	20
Netherlands (Dutch Top 40)	21
Netherlands (Single Top 100)	20
New Zealand (Recorded Music NZ)	5
UK Singles (Official Charts)	32
UK Dance (Official Charts)	23
UK Hip Hop/R&B (Official Charts)	6
US Billboard Hot 100	2
US Dance Singles Sales (Billboard)	2
US Hot R&B/Hip-Hop Songs (Billboard)	1
US Pop Airplay (Billboard)	23
US Rhythmic Airplay (Billboard)	1
US Cash Box Top 100	3

=== Year-end charts ===
Year-end chart performance for "Don't Take It Personal (Just One of Dem Days)"
Chart (1995)	Position
Australia (ARIA)	54
Brazil (Crowley)	86
Netherlands (Dutch Top 40)	188
New Zealand (RIANZ)	19
US Billboard Hot 100	9
US Hot R&B Songs (Billboard)	6
US Maxi-Singles Sales (Billboard)	10
US Cash Box Top 100	11

== Certifications ==
Certifications for "Don't Take It Personal (Just One of Dem Days)"
Region	Certification	Certified units/sales
Australia (ARIA)	Gold	35,000^{^}
New Zealand (RMNZ)	Platinum	10,000^{*}
United States (RIAA)	Platinum	1,000,000^{^}
^{*} Sales figures based on certification alone.^{^} Shipments figures based on certification alone.

== Release history ==
Release dates and formats for "Don't Take It Personal (Just One of Dem Days)"
Region	Date	Format(s)	Label	Ref.
United States	April 7, 1995	Urban contemporary radio	Rowdy; Arista	
United States	April 25, 1995	Rhythmic contemporary radio	Rowdy; Arista	
United States	May 30, 1995	Contemporary hit radio	Rowdy; Arista	
United Kingdom	July 17, 1995	CD; cassette	Rowdy; Arista	
Japan	July 21, 1995	CD	Rowdy	
Australia	August 28, 1995	CD; cassette	Rowdy; Arista	

== Cover versions ==
- American singer White Hinterland covered the song on her Eidolon EP.

== See also ==
- R&B number-one hits of 1995 (USA)
