= Monica (singer) =

American singer (born 1980)

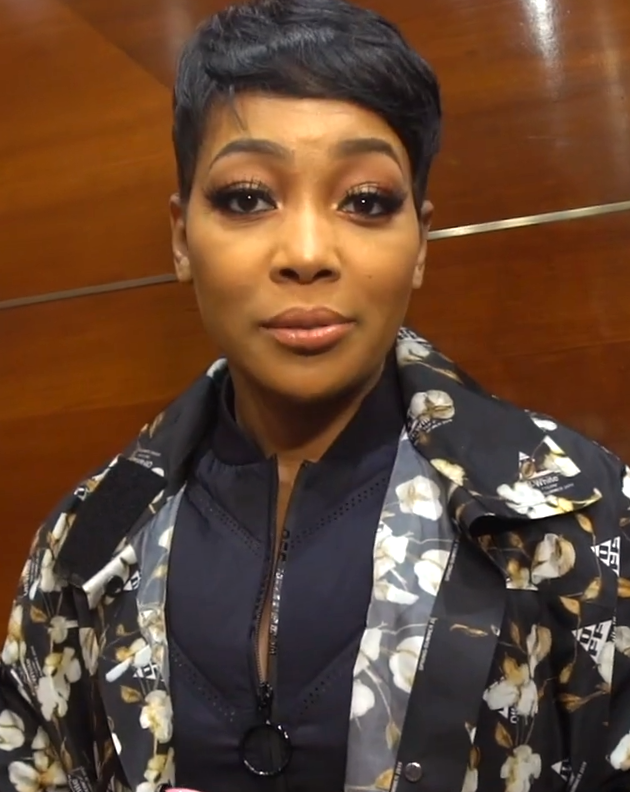
- Monica in 2019
- Born: Monica Denise Arnold; October 24, 1980 (age 46); College Park, Georgia, U.S.
- Other name: Monica Brown
- Education: North Clayton High School
- Occupations: Singer; songwriter; actress
- Years active: 1991–present
- Works: Discography; filmography; songs recorded
- Spouse: Shannon Brown (m. 2010; div. 2019) Anthony Wilson (m. 2025)
- Partner: Rocko (2003–2010)
- Children: 3
- Relatives: Polow da Don (cousin); Ludacris (cousin)
- Awards: Full list
- Musical career
- Genres: R&B; soul; hip-hop soul
- Instruments: Vocals
- Labels: MonDeenise Music; RCA; J; Arista; Rowdy
- Website: monica.com
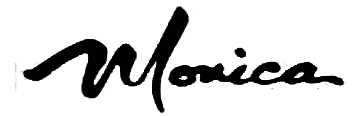

Monica Denise Arnold (born October 24, 1980) is an American singer, songwriter and actress. Born and raised in College Park, Georgia, she began performing as a child and joined a traveling gospel choir by the age of ten. Monica signed with record producer Dallas Austin's label Rowdy Records in 1993, and gained prominence following the release of her debut studio album, Miss Thang (1995). Her follow-up albums were met with continued success; her second, The Boy Is Mine (1998) remains her best-selling album and spawned three Billboard Hot 100-number one singles: "The Boy Is Mine" (with Brandy), "The First Night " and "Angel of Mine".

She then parted ways with Arista and Rowdy Records in favor of Clive Davis's J Records upon the label's launch in 2000. Her Japan-exclusive third album, All Eyez on Me (2002), was met with a steep critical and commercial decline, although its partial re-issue, After the Storm (2003), served as her fourth album and became her first to debut atop the US Billboard 200. Its lead single, "So Gone", peaked at number ten on the Billboard Hot 100. Her fifth and sixth albums, The Makings of Me (2006) and Still Standing (2010), debuted at numbers eight and two on the Billboard 200, respectively; the latter received two Grammy Award nominations. Her seventh, New Life (2012) debuted at number four on the chart despite unfavorable critical response; her eighth album, Code Red (2015) marked her final release with RCA.

Monica's popularity translated into an acting career, with television roles in Living Single (1996), Felicity (2001), and American Dreams (2003), and film roles including Boys and Girls (2000), Love Song (2000), and Pastor Brown (2009). In 2008, she served as an advisor for the NBC competition series The Voice. The recording of her 2008 single, "Still Standing" (featuring Ludacris) along with her personal life resulted in her receiving a reality television series, Monica: Still Standing on BET.

Monica has sold over 25 million records worldwide, with more than eight million of those in the United States alone. In 2000, Billboard ranked her tenth its list of the Top Female Solo Artists of the 1990s. In 2010, the magazine listed her 24th on its list of the Top 50 R&B and Hip-Hop Artists of the past 25 years. A five-time nominee, she won Best R&B Performance by a Duo or Group with Vocals for "The Boy Is Mine" at the 41st Annual Grammy Awards. Her other accolades include a Billboard Music Video Award, a BET Award, and a Soul Train Music Award. In 2009, she received the Lady of Soul Honor.

== Early life ==
Monica Denise Arnold was born in College Park, Georgia, the only daughter of Marilyn Best, a Delta Air Lines customer service representative and former church singer, and M.C. "Billy" Arnold Jr (died May 2026), who was a mechanic for an Atlanta freight company. Arnold's mother is of African American descent and her father is African American, Indian and Irish, as she stated in an interview with Wendy Williams in the year 2000; " My Grandfather was Irish & Black, and my Grandmother was entirely Indian, as my father has Blonde hair & blue eyes." . She has a younger brother, Montez (born in 1983), and a half brother, Jermond Grant, on her father's side. Monica is also a cousin of record producer Polow da Don, and is related to rapper Ludacris through her mother's second marriage to Reverend Edward Best, a Methodist minister.

At the age of 2, Monica followed in her mother's footsteps with regular performances at the Jones Hill Chapel United Methodist Church in Marilyn's hometown Newnan, Georgia. While growing up in the modest circumstances of a single-parent home after her parents' 1984 separation and 1987 divorce, Monica continued training herself in singing and became a frequent talent-show contestant, winning over 20 local singing competitions throughout her early teenage years. When she was 10 years old, she became the youngest member of "Charles Thompson and the Majestics", a traveling 12-person gospel choir. She attended North Clayton High School with rapper 2 Chainz. She graduated from high school in 1997 at age 16, having skipped ahead scholastically by studying year-round with a private tutor.

== Career ==
=== 1991–2000: Miss Thang and The Boy Is Mine ===
In 1991, at the age of eleven, Monica was discovered by music producer Dallas Austin at the Center Stage auditorium in Atlanta, performing Whitney Houston 1986's "Greatest Love of All". Amazed by her voice, Dallas offered her a record deal with his label Rowdy Records, and consulted rapper Queen Latifah to work as Monica's first manager. Shortly afterwards Dallas and then staff producers Tim & Bob entered the studio with Monica to start writing and producing her debut Miss Thang, which was released in July 1995 and peaked at number 36 on the Billboard 200 (and number seven on the Top R&B Albums chart). To date the album has sold 1.5 million copies in the United States. By January 2000, it received triple platinum certification by the RIAA for three million units. The album yielded three singles, including her debut "Don't Take It Personal (Just One of Dem Days)", and its follow-up "Before You Walk Out of My Life", which made Monica the youngest artist to have two consecutive chart-topping songs on the U.S. Billboard Hot R&B Singles chart. Miss Thang earned Monica an American Music Award nomination for Favorite New Soul/R&B Artist. The video for "Don't Take It Personal", directed by Rich Murray, was nominated for a Billboard Award for best video by a new artist.

Following the album's success, Monica's mainstream success was boosted. Her 1997 song "For You I Will"—recorded for Space Jam: Music from and Inspired by the Motion Picture (1996)—became her next pop hit, peaking at number four on the Billboard Hot 100. The song was written by Diane Warren. The following year, she was asked to team up with singer Brandy and producer Rodney "Darkchild" Jerkins to record "The Boy Is Mine", the first single from both of their second albums. Released in May 1998, surrounding highly publicized rumors about a real-life catfight between both singers, the duet became both the biggest hit of the summer and the biggest hit of 1998 in general in America, spending thirteen weeks on top of the Billboard Hot 100 chart. It earned the pair a Grammy Award for Best R&B Performance by a Duo or Group with Vocal" and garnered multi-platinum sales (to date, it remains as one of the top twenty most successful American singles in history based on Billboard chart success). Jermaine Dupri, David Foster and Austin consulted on the album The Boy Is Mine, which was released later that year and it eventually became Monica's biggest-selling album; selling over 2,016,000 copies. In June 2000, the album was certified triple platinum by the RIAA for three million shipped units. It yielded another two U.S. number-one hits with "The First Night" and "Angel of Mine", a cover of Eternal's 1997 single, as well as a remake of Richard Marx' "Right Here Waiting". Rolling Stone proclaimed it "closer to soul's source... harking back past hip-hop songbirds like Mary J. Blige and adult-contemporary sirens like Toni Braxton", while AllMusic called the album an "irresistible sounding [and] immaculately crafted musical backdrop [...] as good as mainstream urban R&B gets in 1998." Monica has also made guest appearances on several television shows such as Living Single (1996), Beverly Hills, 90210 (1997, 1999) and the Cartoon Network special Brak Presents The Brak Show Starring Brak (2000).

=== 2000–2005: All Eyez on Me and After the Storm ===
In 2000, Monica made her film debut as Camille Livingston, a young woman torn between the life her parents have planned for her and the world she experiences after meeting a musician from the wrong side of the tracks, in Love Song, the third drama produced by MTV Films. Love Song was released on December 1, 2000, and debuted the song "What My Heart Says" along with promotion for the singer's third studio album All Eyez on Me (2002). Monica has also acted in Felicity (2001) and American Dreams (2003), playing Mary Wells and singing "My Guy".

Also in 2000, Monica contributed chorus vocals for "I've Got to Have It", a collaboration with Jermaine Dupri and rapper Nas. Released as the Big Momma's House theme song, the track saw minor success in the United States. The following year, she released the Ric Wake–produced "Just Another Girl", a promotional single for the Down to Earth soundtrack.

A year later, Monica channeled much of her heavily media-discussed experiences into the production of her third studio album, All Eyez on Me, her first release on her mentor Clive Davis's newly established label J Records. "I just wanted to give the people back something that had personal passion, instead of just, 'Oh, let's dance to this record'", she said regarding the issues worked into the tracks. The first single "All Eyez on Me", a Rodney Jerkins-produced R&B-dance track, saw minor to moderate success on the international charts but failed to enter the higher half of the U.S. Billboard Hot 100 chart. A follow-up song, "Too Hood", also got a lukewarm response and as a result, the album's tentative release was pushed back several times. "I don't think people wanted to hear a big fun record from me, after knowing all the things that I had personally experienced", Monica second-guessed her new material which saw both early and heavy bootlegging via internet at that time.

After the Japan-wide release of All Eyez on Me, Monica was asked to substantially reconstruct the record with a host of new producers, and as a result she re-entered recording studios to start work with songwriters Kanye West, Jazze Pha, Andre "mrDEYO" Deyo, Bam & Ryan and Dupri—replacing executive producer Missy Elliott. Released in June 2003, After the Storm debuted at number one on the Billboard 200 chart with first-week sales of 185,500 copies. This was Monica's first and only time reaching number-one on the chart. It eventually received a gold certification, and has sold 1,023,000 copies to date. Media reception of the CD was generally enthusiastic, with AllMusic saying the album "has all the assuredness and smart developments that should keep Monica's younger longtime followers behind her—all the while holding the ability to appeal to a wider spectrum of R&B and hip-hop fans." The album's lead single, Elliott-penned "So Gone", was one of Monica's biggest commercial successes in years, becoming her first top ten single since 1999's "Angel of Mine". In addition, it reached the top position of the Billboard R&B/Hip-Hop Tracks and Hot Dance Club Play charts. Subsequently, After the Storm spawned another three singles, with final single "U Should've Known Better" reaching number nineteen on the Billboard Hot 100 chart.

=== 2006–2010: The Makings of Me, Still Standing, and reality television ===
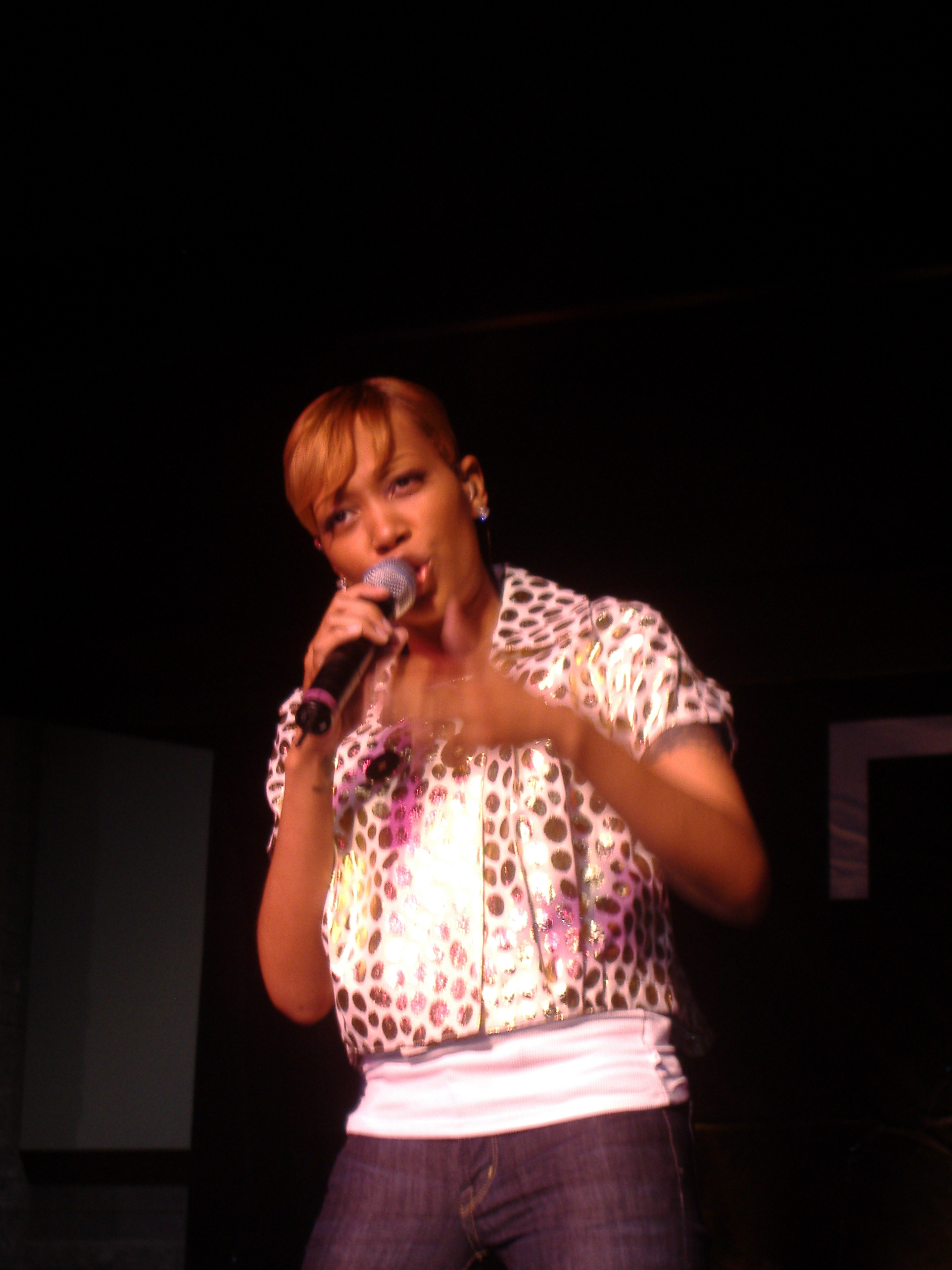
Monica performing at the DC Black Pride in 2007

Towards the end of 2006, Monica released her next studio album The Makings of Me. Titled after Curtis Mayfield's recording "The Makings of You", it saw her particularly reuniting with producers Elliott, Dupri, and Bryan Michael Cox; they had previously contributed to After the Storm. The album received a positive reception from most professional music critics, with AllMusic calling it a "concise and mostly sweet set of songs", and Entertainment Weekly declaring it "a solid addition" to Monica's discography. While it debuted at number one on Billboard's Top R&B/Hip-Hop albums chart, and at number eight on the official Billboard 200, it widely failed to revive the success of its predecessors. Singles such as snap-influenced "Everytime tha Beat Drop" featuring Atlanta hip-hop group Dem Franchize Boyz and Elliott-produced "A Dozen Roses (You Remind Me)" failed to reach the top forty of the regular pop charts. Also in 2006, she made a cameo appearance in the American comedy-drama film ATL, playing the Waffle House waitress.

In August 2008, Monica appeared in the Peachtree TV reality show special Monica: The Single, which tracked the recording of the song "Still Standing" for her same-titled sixth studio album. The following year, she lent her voice to the ballad "Trust", a duet with Keyshia Cole, that peaked in the top five on Billboard Hot R&B/Hip-Hop Songs chart, and joined the cast of Rockmond Dunbar's drama film Pastor Brown. In 2010, with the success of the 2008 one-hour special, Monica joined the production of the BET network for her own series Monica: Still Standing, producing a spin-off her Peachtree show, containing the same concept. It focused on finding a hit single for the album's release while balancing her personal life as a full-time mother and dealing with her troubled past. The premiere and encore episode garnered 3.2 million total viewers, while the show itself was made the second-highest series debut in BET history behind the debut of Tiny & Toya, and was given a B rating by Entertainment Weekly.

Featuring production by Stargate, Ne-Yo, and Polow da Don, Still Standing was released in March 2010 and garnered a generally positive response by critics, who perceived its sound as "a return to the mid-'90s heyday" of contemporary R&B. The album debuted atop on Billboard's Top R&B/Hip-Hop albums chart, and number two on the Billboard 200 with opening week sales of 184,000 copies, becoming her highest-charting album in years. Lead single "Everything to Me" scored Monica her biggest chart success since 2003's "So Gone", reaching the top position of the Billboard R&B/Hip-Hop Tracks charts for seven weeks. The album was certified gold by the RIAA with domestic shipments of 500,000 copies within a single month. With it success, the album and "Everything to Me" were nominated for a Grammy Award for Best R&B Album and Best Female R&B Vocal Performance, presented at the 53rd Grammy Awards. Monica met future husband and NBA player Shannon Brown in June 2010 when they shot the music video for her second single "Love All Over Me". Also in 2010, Monica joined Trey Songz on his Passion, Pain & Pleasure Tour, her first North American concert tour in ten years.

=== 2011–2016: New Life and Code Red ===
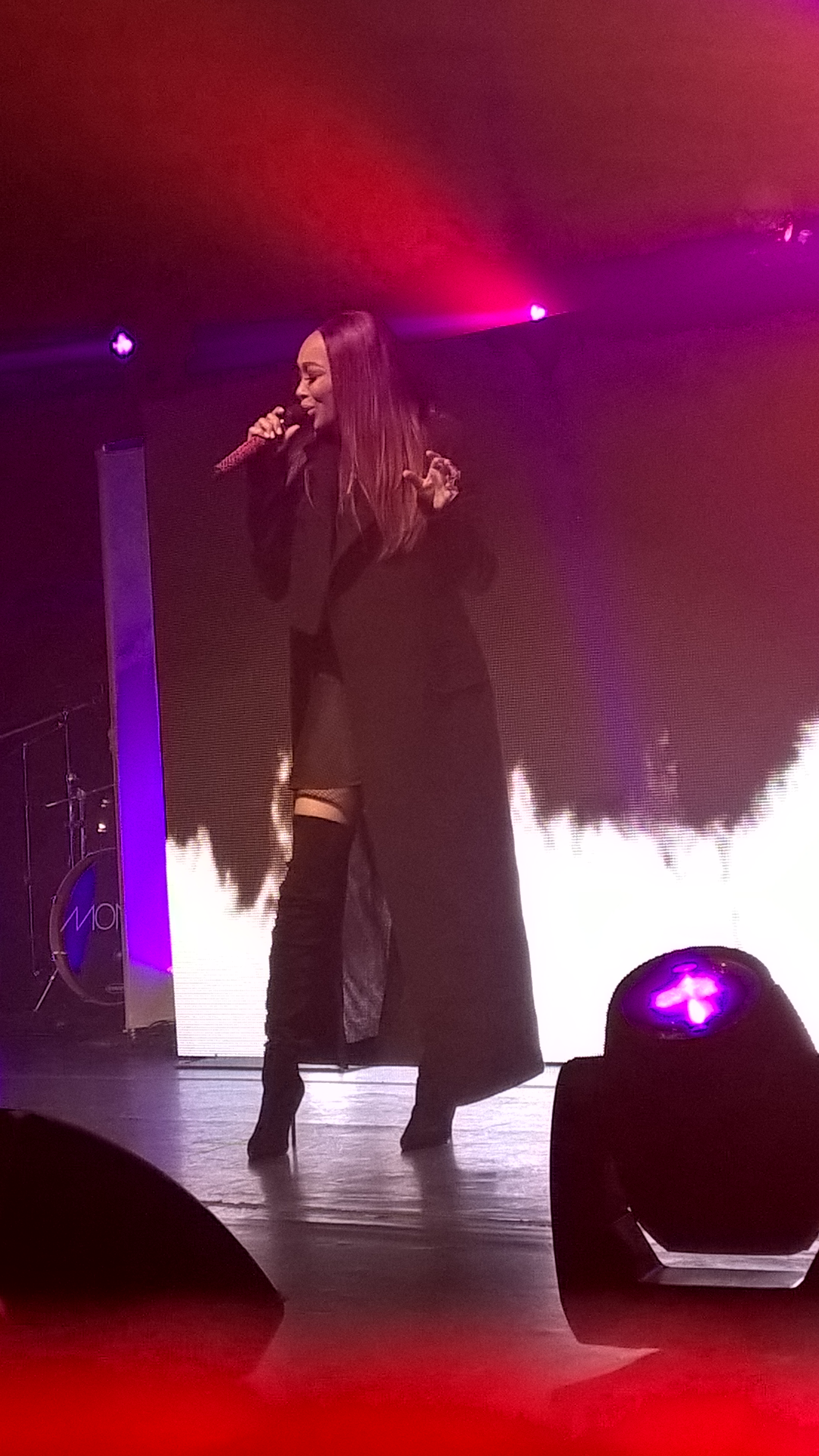
Monica performing in 2014

In 2011, Monica joined the debut season of the reality talent show The Voice as an adviser to musician coach Cee Lo Green. In April 2012, her seventh studio album, New Life, was released. It marked her first release with RCA, following its absorption of J Records in October 2011. Reception for the album was generally mixed; AllMusic complimented the album's "saucy, spirited, and soulful vibe" while Adam Markovitz of Entertainment Weekly criticized its "cheesy choruses and outdated tunes". Commercially, New Life debuted at number four on the Billboard 200 and number two on the Top R&B/Hip-Hop Albums. The album spawned two preview singles, "Anything (To Find You)" and "Until It's Gone", both of which peaked in the top 30 on the Billboard R&B/Hip-Hop Songs chart. Lead single "It All Belongs to Me", another duet with singer Brandy, charted similarly, reaching number 23 on the same chart. The same year, Monica along with Fred Hammond was featured on gospel music recording artist James Fortune and FIYA's single "Hold On" which became a top five hit on the Christian Songs chart and garnered a Grammy Award nomination for Best Gospel Song at the 54th awards ceremony.

In October 2013, Monica appeared on the soundtrack of Malcolm D. Lee's Christmas comedy-drama The Best Man Holiday with her Jermaine Dupri-produced rendition of "Have Yourself a Merry Little Christmas". In December 2015, her eighth studio album Code Red was released. Upon its release, the album received generally mixed reviews from most music critics, and debuted at number 27 on the US Billboard 200 chart. Leading single "Just Right for Me", a collaboration with Lil Wayne, reached number twelve on the Billboard Adult R&B Songs chart but failed to impact elsewhere, resulting in lackluster sales in general and the release of no further singles. In support of the album, Monica embarked on her first solo concert tour in years, The Code Red Experience to promote Code Red. In November 2016, Monica announced her departure from RCA Records after only four years with the label.

=== 2018–2024: New music and Verzuz ===
In December 2018, Monica released the ballad "Be Human" to introduce The Be Human Foundation, a non profit organization founded by herself. The same month, she previewed music from her ninth studio album when she appeared on the seventh season of the VH1 reality series T.I. & Tiny: The Family Hustle. In January 2019, she released "Commitment," the first single on her own label, Mondeenise Music. A sleeper hit, "Commitment" reached number one on the US Billboard Adult R&B Songs in the week ending July 21, 2019, becoming her first chart topper in nine years. This was followed by the release of "Me + You" in April 2019 and the album's initial title track "Trenches" featuring Lil Baby in August 2020. The release of "Trenches" coincided with Monica and Brandy's appearances on the webcast battle series Verzuz which took place on August 31, at Tyler Perry Studios in Atlanta. At least 1.2 million people tuned in for the battle. In October 2020, Monica was featured on the single "Pink" alongside Dolly Parton, Jordin Sparks, Sara Evans and Rita Wilson. The single was released in aid of Breast Cancer Research.

In July 2022, Monica released the single, "Friends," featuring Ty Dolla Sign. The song became her first top forty hit on the US R&B/Hip-Hop Airplay chart in three years. In 2023, she reteamed with singer James Fortune on the duet "Trusting God." Released as a single through Fortune's FIYA World Entertainment, it reached the top 30 on the US Billboard Hot Gospel Songs chart. "Letters," another single, was released through Mondeenise Music in June 2023. In December 2023, Monica appeared alongside Nicki Minaj and Keyshia Cole on the song "Love Me Enough" from the "Gag City" deluxe version of Minaj's album Pink Friday 2. In June 2024, Ariana Grande released "The Boy Is Mine (Remix)," a reimagination of the 1998 duet which also features both Monica and Brandy. In late July, the singer re-signed with WMA agency in partnership with her production company MonDeenise Productions. She announced that her recently renamed R&B album, now called MDA, along with her country album Open Road, executive produced by country singer Brandi Carlile, were both set for release later this year. However, neither release ultimately materialized.

=== 2025-present: Tour with Brandy ===
On June 24, 2025, it was announced Arnold would co-headline a United States tour with Brandy; the tour is due to commence in October 2025, and finish in December 2025. Titled the Boy Is Mine Tour, the shows will also feature support acts Kelly Rowland, Muni Long and Jamal Roberts.

On July 6, 2026, Monica appeared in a Missy Elliott-curated Aaliyah tribute, speaking via a video montage, for the finale at that year's Essence Festival of Culture. In November 2026, after their performance on Dancing With the Stars, Monica alongside Brandy announced their The Boy Is Mine Las Vegas residency.

== Artistry and influences ==
Monica possesses an alto vocal range, which Billboard's Erika Ramirez described as "impeccable". Elysa Gardner of the Los Angeles Times likened her "husky, dramatic alto" to that of singer Toni Braxton. Writing that the singer arguably possesses "the best alto of her generation", PopMatters contributor Tyler Lewis said Monica has "always been able to elevate even the most generic material [...] with conviction and the sheer beauty of her voice", despite believing she uses "a little too much vibrato at times".

Monica has said many times that Whitney Houston is her biggest inspiration and influence since childhood. Another big influence is Mary J. Blige. Other artists she looks up to are Betty Wright, Gladys Knight and Anita Baker.

== Personal life ==
Monica's career slowed down in 1999 due to problems in her relationship with ex-boyfriend Jarvis Weems. In July 2000, the couple were together at the gravesite of Weems's brother, who had died in an automobile accident at age 25 in 1998. Weems then, without warning, put a gun to his head and committed suicide. "Afterward, I felt, 'What else could I have done?' You replay that situation over and over and you switch it around: 'Maybe if I had said this, or if I would have done that'", Monica said in an interview with the Associated Press in 2003. "It's just something that it's never possible for me to go back and change." Monica briefly dated rapper, C-Murder, until he was incarcerated for a murder in 2003.

Monica met rapper Rodney "Rocko" Hill shortly after Weems's suicide, a time which she described as her "weakest". While the pair soon began dating in the fall of the same year, they ended their relationship in 2004. A few months later, Monica and Hill reunited and she became pregnant with their first child. On May 21, 2005, she gave birth to their son, Rodney, who performs under "Rodneyy" as a SoundCloud rapper. Monica and Hill then became engaged on Christmas Eve 2007, shortly before the birth of their second child, named Romelo Montez Hill after Monica's younger brother, on January 8, 2008. The couple split in early 2010.

In June 2010, Monica met NBA player Shannon Brown while she was looking for someone to play the love interest in her video for the song "Love All Over Me". In October 2010, she announced her engagement to Brown via her Twitter account, posting a photo of a rose-cut diamond ring. On November 22, 2010, the couple married in a secret ceremony at their Los Angeles home. Their wedding, however, did not become a matter of public record until January 21, 2011, when Brown told the Hip-Hop Non-Stop TV-Show. A second wedding ceremony was held for family and friends to attend in July 2011. On September 3, 2013, Monica gave birth to her third child, Laiyah Shannon Brown. After eight years of marriage, Monica filed for divorce from Brown in March 2019. In October 2019, their divorce was finalized.

In August 2025, Monica married talent manager Anthony Wilson.

== Discography ==
Studio albums

- Miss Thang (1995)
- The Boy Is Mine (1998)
- All Eyez on Me (2002)
- After the Storm (2003)
- The Makings of Me (2006)
- Still Standing (2010)
- New Life (2012)
- Code Red (2015)
- Chapter 38 (2019)

== Filmography ==
=== Film ===
Year	Title	Role	Notes
2000	Boys and Girls	Katie	
2000	Love Song	Camille Livingston	TV movie
2006	ATL	Waffle House Waitress	
2009	Pastor Brown	Lisa Cross	
2016	Almost Christmas	Waitress	

=== Television ===
Year	Title	Role	Notes
1995–97	Soul Train	Herself	Recurring Guest
1995–99	All That	Herself	Recurring Guest
1996	Showtime at the Apollo	Herself	Episode: "Episode 9.16"
1996	Living Single	Marissa	Episode: "Kiss of the Spider Man"
1996	New York Undercover	Herself	Episode: "If This World Were Mine"
1997–99	Beverly Hills, 90210	Herself	Guest Cast: Season 7 & 9
1999	Soul Train Music Awards	Herself/Co-Host	Main Co-Host
1999	Soul Train Lady of Soul Awards	Herself/Co-Host	Main Co-Host
2000	Brak Presents the Brak Show Starring Brak	Herself	Episode: "Episode 1.1"
2000	Hollywood Squares	Herself/Panelist	Recurring Panelist
2001	Felicity	Sarah Robinson	Episode: "Miss Conception"
2003	American Dreams	Mary Wells	Episode: "R-E-S-P-E-C-T"
2003	American Juniors	Herself/Guest Judge	Episodes: "Episode 1.13" & "1.14"
2004	E! True Hollywood Story	Herself	Episode: "Missy Elliott"
2006	Access Granted	Herself	Episode: "Monica ft. Dem Franchize Boyz 'Everytime Tha Beat Drop'"
2009	Monica: Still Standing	Herself	Main Cast
2010	Kourtney & Kim Take Miami	Herself	Episode: "Picture Perfect"
2011	Khloé & Lamar	Herself	Episode: "Unbreakable"
2011	The Voice	Herself/Adviser	Episode: "The Battles, Part 1"
2016	The Real	Herself/Guest Co-Host	Recurring Guest Co-Host: Season 3
2017	Hip Hop Squares	Herself/Center Square	Episode: "Sky vs Kid Ink"
2017	The Talk	Herself/Guest Co-Host	Episode: "Episode 8.41"
2017	Star	Announcer	Episode: "Showtime"
2021	Celebrity Game Face	Herself	Episode: "Wham Bam, Thank You Fam!"
2022	Celebrity Family Feud	Herself/Contestant	Episode: "Simu Liu vs. Nathan Chen and Monica vs. So So Def"
2022	Entertainment Tonight	Herself/Guest Co-Host	Episode: "Episode 41.260"
2023	Celebrity True Crime Story	Herself/Host	Main Host
2026	Dancing with the Stars	Herself	Season 35; guest performer with Brandy
