= Rowdy Records =

American record label

- Parent company: Dallas Austin Distribution
- Founded: 1992
- Founder: Dallas Austin; Antonio "L.A." Reid
- Distributors: Dallas Austin Distribution (2020-present); Capitol (2008-2009); Motown (2005-2008); Republic (2005-2008); Interscope (2005-2008); Arista (1992-1997); Legacy Recordings (reissues of 1990s catalog)
- Genre: Various, with a focus on hip hop and R&B
- Country of origin: United States
- Location: Atlanta, Georgia
- Official website: rowdy-records.com

Rowdy Records is an American record label distributed by record producer Dallas Austin, who founded the label in 1992. It is a precursor to his entertainment company, Freeworld Entertainment.

== History ==
Formed in 1992 by producers Dallas Austin and L.A. Reid, Rowdy was initially distributed through Arista Records. At the time, Austin had gained notoriety for writing and producing hits for acts like Monica, Another Bad Creation, Boyz II Men, Joi, For Real, Da King & I and TLC. Reid, meanwhile, was also running the fledgling LaFace Records. In 1993, Reid stepped down to continue focusing his energies on LaFace, leaving Dallas to run the Atlanta-based company on his own.

Rowdy shot to success in 1993 with rap group Illegal, who had two number-one rap singles and the number-one Billboard rap single of the year.

1995 saw the release of the triple platinum debut album from fourteen-year-old R&B singer Monica entitled Miss Thang. Other acts on the label included: Y'all So Stupid, For Real, Fishbone and Caron Wheeler. The label also released the soundtrack to the motion-picture Fled.

In spite of the label's strong buzz in the industry (mainly due to Austin's name being attached to it), by 1997 Rowdy began to flounder, as Monica's debut album had been its biggest release to date—and arguably the company's only success. Creative differences with Arista subsequently caused Rowdy to vacate its fold, while Monica (its most notable star) remained at Arista. Without a major distributor, Rowdy briefly went the independent route before stalling completely. Austin's career, meanwhile, continued to thrive as he remained a highly sought after producer, which led to him stepping down as CEO. Rowdy closed in 1998. He then started the short-lived record label Freeworld Entertainment after the dissolution of Rowdy.

In 2005, when the hip group Da BackWudz caught Austin's attention, he decided to reactivate Rowdy (after seven years of dormancy) in order to sign them. Upon its reactivation, Rowdy took up distribution with Motown Records.

The label is currently self-distributed by Dallas Austin, who revived the label in 2020 after eleven further years of dormancy. Artists signed to the label when it relaunched include Johnny Apollo and Shac From Da 3. It has also released Break Out, a 2025 comeback album by Jussie Smollett.

== Notable artists ==
- Jussie Smollett

=== Former ===
- Da BackWudz
- Vonzell Solomon
- Y'all So Stupid
- Sammie
- Monica
- Da King & I
- Illegal
- Rampage the Last Boy Scout
- Jamal a.k.a. Mally G
- For Real
- Fishbone

== Notable producers ==
- Tim & Bob (1993-1999)
- Mario Winans (1995-1998)

== See also ==
- List of record labels
