= Mandy Capristo discography =

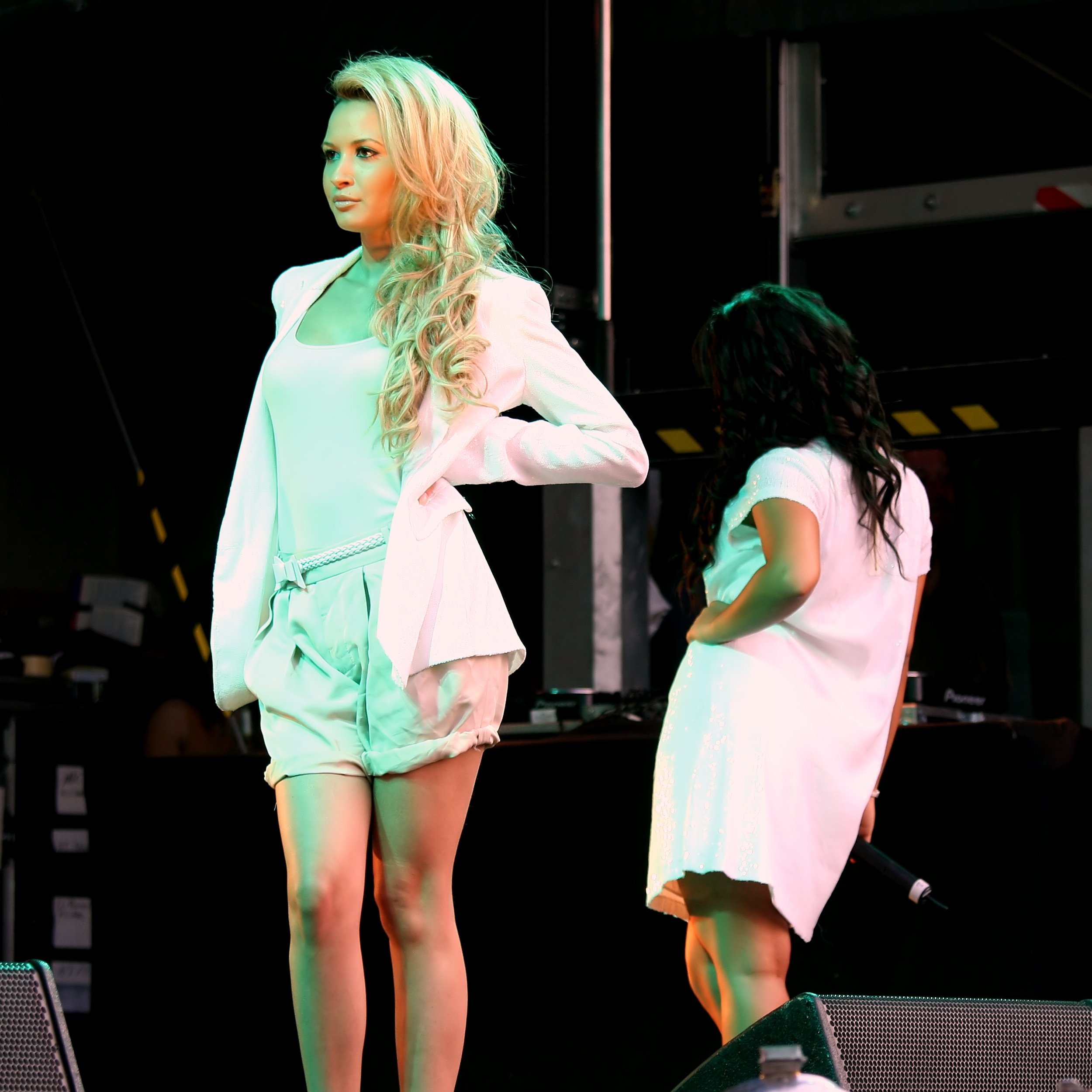
- Mandy Capristo in Cologne, 2009.
- Studio albums: 1
- Extended plays: 1
- Singles: 6
- Music videos: 1

This list is an abstract of the musical works of Mandy Capristo. Together with Monrose, she sold more than 3 million Singles and Albums.

== Albums ==
=== Studio albums ===
List of albums, with selected chart positions
| Title | Album details | Peak chart positions | | |
| Title | Album details | GER | AUT | SWI |
|---|---|---|---|---|
| Grace | Released: April 27, 2012; Label: EMI, Starwatch; Format: CD, Music download, streaming | 8 | 28 | 21 |

== Singles ==
=== As solo artist ===
List of singles, with selected chart positions and certifications
| Title | Year | Peak chart positions | | | Certifications | Album |
| Title | Year | GER | AUT | SWI | Certifications | Album |
|---|---|---|---|---|---|---|
| "The Way I Like It" | 2012 | 11 | 30 | 29 | BVMI: Gold | Grace |
| "Closer" | 2012 | 64 | 73 | — | | Grace |
| "One Woman Army" | 2016 | — | — | — | | Non-album singles |
| "Si es amor" (with Larsito) | 2018 | 52 | — | — | | Non-album singles |
| "13 Schritte" | 2020 | — | — | — | | Non-album singles |
| "Genug" | 2021 | — | — | — | | Non-album singles |
| "Million Dollar Smile" | 2025 | — | — | — | | Sense Tive |
"—" denotes a title that was not released or did not chart in that territory.

=== As featured artist ===
| Title | Year | Peak chart positions | | | Album |
| Title | Year | GER | AUT | SWI | Album |
|---|---|---|---|---|---|
| "Die Zeit hält nur in Träumen an" (Peter Maffay featuring Mandy Grace Capristo) | 2011 | 86 | — | — | Tabaluga und die Zeichen der Zeit |
| "Ricorderai l'amore (Remember the Love)" (Marco Mengoni featuring Grace Capristo) | 2016 | — | — | — | Parole in circolo – Special Edition |

== Other Appearances ==
| Year | Song | Album |
|---|---|---|
| 2001 | "Ich wünsche mir einen Bankomat" | Kiddy Contest Vol. 7 |
| 2002 | "Moskito" | Kiddy Contest Vol. 8 |
| 2009 | "Durch die Nacht" (Kay One featuring Dudi & Mandy Capristo) | Kenneth allein zu Haus (Premium Edition) |
| 2011 | "Be You" | Advertisement song for "BeYu" |
| 2012 | "Entfernte Welten" | Tinker Bell: Best of 1-4 |
| 2012 | "Entfernte Welten - Reprise" | Tinker Bell: Best of 1-4 |
| 2012 | "Wir sind da" | Tinker Bell: Best of 1-4 |
| 2012 | "The Great Divide" | Tinker Bell: Best of 1-4 |
| 2012 | "One Moment in Time" | The Dome Vol. 61 |
| 2013 | "Be Free - Aldiana" | Non-album track (Free download) |
| 2017 | "Like a Hobo" (with Gregor Meyle) | Xaviers Wunschkonzert Vol. 5 |
| 2017 | "Every Breath You Take" (with Xavier Naidoo) | Xaviers Wunschkonzert Vol. 5 |
| 2022 | "Fade to Grey" (Alex Christensen and the Berlin Orchestra featuring Mandy Capristo) | Classical 80s Dance |

== Music videos ==
| Song | Year | Director(s) |
|---|---|---|
| "The Way I Like It" | 2012 | Lennart Brede |
| "Closer" | 2012 | Oliver Sommer |
| "The Great Divide" | 2012 | - |
| "Die Zeit hält nur in Träumen an" (Peter Maffay featuring Mandy Grace Capristo) | 2013 | Sandra Marschner |
| "One Woman Army" | 2016 | Grace Capristo |
| "Si es amor" (Larsito, Mandy Capristo) | 2018 | Hamish Stephenson |
| "13 Schritte" | 2020 | Robert Wunsch |

== Other ==
- Monrose discography
