= It All Belongs to Me =

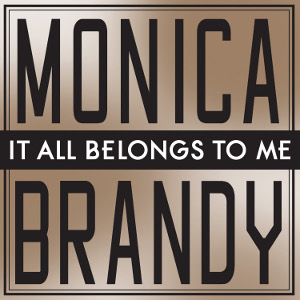

Single by Monica and Brandy

from the album New Life
- Released: February 13, 2012
- Studio: Circle House Recording Studios (Miami, FL)
- Genre: R&B; pop
- Length: 4:04
- Label: RCA
- Songwriters: Rico Love; Earl Hood; Eric Goudy II
- Producers: Rico Love; Earl & E

Monica singles chronology
"Until It's Gone" (2011)	"It All Belongs to Me" (2012)	"Without You" (2012)

Brandy singles chronology
"Talk to Me" (2010)	"It All Belongs to Me" (2012)	"Put It Down" (2012)

Music video
- "It All Belongs to Me" on YouTube

"It All Belongs to Me" is a duet by American recording artists Monica and Brandy. Written and produced by Rico Love, Earl Hood, and Eric Goudy II, the track belonged to singer R. Kelly. He then gave the song to Monica and the label presented the song to Brandy, who expressed her wish to record a duet. After Clive Davis authorized it, they went to a recording studio located in Miami, Florida to record the track. Three different versions were made, with one being released as the official lead single from Monica's seventh studio album New Life on February 10, 2012, through RCA Records. It is the first time Monica and Brandy worked together since they collaborated on "The Boy Is Mine" (1998).

"It All Belongs to Me" is a midtempo R&B ballad. Lyrically, the song is a female empowerment anthem in which both singers claims their belongings as they leave their abusive boyfriends behind. The chorus has references to MacBook and Facebook. It also received several comparisons to Beyoncé' single "Irreplaceable" (2006). "It All Belongs to Me" received generally mixed reviews from contemporary critics who praised both singers' vocal performance, but were disappointed with the track, commenting that the hype behind it was big, but also noting that the track wouldn't be as successful as "The Boy Is Mine". "It All Belongs to Me" reached number 23 on the US Billboard Hot R&B/Hip-Hop Songs chart.

An accompanying music video for "It All Belongs to Me" was directed by Chris Robinson. It premiered on VH1 on March 5, 2012. The video was inspired by the films Thelma & Louise (1991) and Waiting to Exhale (1995), and portrays the singers in dysfunctional relationships and helping each other in both situations. Monica and Brandy promoted the song doing several performances, radio and television interviews. The singers were also going to perform the track on the Clive Davis' Pre-Grammy Party in 2012; however, the performance was cancelled following Whitney Houston's death.

== Background ==
Brandy and Monica first worked together in 1997, on a song titled "The Boy is Mine." Created as a solo track, Brandy recorded the song alone. After listening to the result, however, she and Rodney Jerkins thought it would work better as a duet, an idea which was further inspired by Paul McCartney and Michael Jackson's 1982 hit duet "The Girl Is Mine". Jerkins, who produced the track, later claimed that both singers "didn't get along" during production and that he and Dexter Simmons remixed the track seven times to keep everything even. Monica later spoke about her relationship with Brandy in an interview with WZMX, stating, "we were young. We could barely stay in the room with each other. By no means was it jealousy or envy. She and I are polar opposites and instead of embracing that, we used our differences as reasons not to be amongst each other."

Later in 2011, it was reported that producer Rico Love was working with Monica on her seventh studio album, New Life. Love conceived "It All Belongs to Me" as a loose sequel to "The Boy is Mine." He stated that the song was essentially picking up where the 1998 duet left off, telling Rap-Up in 2012: "It's a very soulful R&B song with pop sensibilities. I wanted to make sure I made it a classic R&B record, but I definitely wanted to make sure that it had enough appeal to cross over and become a Top 40 record". In April 2012, Monica that the song was initially produced for and belonged to R&B singer R. Kelly and was intended to be part of his 2012 album Write Me Back. She further explained that she actually "had to really go to him and ask him: 'Can I take this song, I really wanna take this song and put it on my new album'." Kelly ended up giving the song to her, which resulted in Monica thanking him "from the bottom of [her] heart." The label then brought up the idea to her to put Brandy on the song, which was initially intended as a solo song.

== Recording ==
After "It All Belongs to Me" was presented to Monica, the singer revealed that she wanted to record a duet with Brandy, following their first released in 1998. Brandy also had plans to record a new duet with Monica. After talking to RCA and Chameleon Records executives Peter Edge and Breyon Prescott, both singers agreed to record the song. Monica, however, stated that she was not going to the studio without Clive Davis' permission. Brandy's team then contacted Davis, who authorized the duet. Brandy and Monica then recorded the song together in a recording studio located on Miami, Florida from January 6 to 8, 2012. Brandy said that the energy of the recording sessions was "magical! I was just so excited to see her again, just to work with her again. The session was great. It was like it was meant to be. It was like we never missed a beat." The singers also took pictures and talked about their current lives. Brandy also revealed that she and Monica wanted to "give [their] best vocals ever on a song."

Monica revealed that, before passing, Whitney Houston came to her after hearing "It All Belongs to Me" and said, "You killin' that run at the end. And you know I know you stole that from me, right?" Rico Love commented on the recording sessions of the song in an interview with magazine Rap-Up, saying that "it was a really interesting situation because of the history that was in the room and the energy was so positive. It was electric. I really wanted to try my best to pull the most explosive vocals out of them. ´... It kinda carried on the next part of the story, just showing their growth and their maturity, and making it real and true to both singers. It was an amazing energy, an amazing vibe. The girls were all positive. It was just fun. We had a great time and I learned so much from both of them during the session." Love also revealed that they did alternate versions of the song for both Monica and Brandy's albums but also noted that the changes were minimal. "It All Belongs to Me" was later omitted from Brandy's next project Two Eleven (2012).

== Composition ==
"It All Belongs to Me"
A 23-second sample of the R&B oriented ballad, where both singers demand their belongings back.

"It All Belongs to Me" is a midtempo pop and R&B song that lasts for four minutes and six seconds. A ballad, the first verse starts with Brandy singing, "No, no, no, sugar/You must be blind/You must be dumb/You must be tripping/You must be crazy/To think I'm gonna let you off that easy." As the chorus follows, Monica starts to sing along with Brandy, with both stating that they do not belong to their boyfriends, "But put that back/That ain't yours/Have a fit/Slam the door/But leave them bags/On the floor/That s--- belongs to me/Those clothes, cars, those rings/And that MacBook/That s--- belongs to me/So log off your Facebook, it all belongs to me." Sowmya Krishnamurthy of MTV said the track "is all about girl power and kicking that no-good-low-down-dirty-dog guy to the curb." According to John Mitchel also of MTV, "the fierce twosome are joining forces against to kick the no-good men in their lives to the curb." Towards the end of the song, Brandy and Monica starts to sing in a melismatic form, with the latter singing the last line.

== Critical reception ==
Each is special in her own right, and each clearly has had much success. ... The fact that they have gotten back together to reunite with a duet recording, we're gonna celebrate and we're gonna have a great time Saturday night.

— Clive Davis reflects on the duet.

In an interview with Yahoo! Music, Brandy told that she was expecting female listeners to love the song. According to HitFix, the track was well received by the public, being ranked as B+ on the reader's rating. However, "It All Belongs to Me" received mixed reviews from contemporary critics. Andrew Hampp of Billboard gave the song a mixed review, saying "it's about five notches below Beyoncé's 'Irreplaceable' in the sass department, and could use an extra hook or two. Still, the four-minute track finishes on a familiar note, with the two singers delivering melisma after melisma, trying to outdo the other over whom all the stuff belongs to (for the record, Monica gets the last word)." Billy Johnson Jr. of Yahoo! Music, however, said that the song's message "is tougher and more humiliating to the male ego than Beyoncé's 'Irreplaceable'," while describing it as a "fluttering piano ballad." Bill Lamb of About.com ranked "It All Belongs to Me" as the eight best pop song of the week ending on February 16, 2012. Elena Gorgan of Softpedia said that the collaboration was "worth the wait," while Michael O'Connell and Shirley Haperin of The Hollywood Reporter thought that it "serves as a solid showcase for two voices that reached their pop culture pinnacle 14 years ago."

Entertainment Weekly writer April Daley found surprising that Monica and Brandy didn't collaborate earlier in their career, as they've reportedly been close friends for years. Daley, however, noted that "unlike their '98 hit, this sleeper isn't likely to make a major dent in your Most Played list — while it seems to have the right ingredients, strong vocals, and an empowering message, it suffers from watered-down couplets about Facebook and Macbooks and a beat that isn't quite catchy enough." She also compared it to Beyoncé's "Irreplaceable", commenting that the duet is a new version "with two leads and more juvenile lyrics." Becky Bain of Idolator considered it a "snappy R&B tune", and said that it's "nice to see these two ladies finally getting along!" AOL Music's Kenneth Partridge commented on the track, saying, "they've been burned by their fellas, and they they're not shy about showing some sisterly solidarity and standing up for themselves." Danielle Cheesman of MSN Entertainment criticized "It All Belongs to Me", saying, "let's face it, [the song is] never ever going to be as big as 'The Boy Is Mine'."

Dan Martin of NME commented that "It All Belongs to Me" is "not the gold comeback standard" that people were expecting, and stated that despite "groovy references to 'Facebook' and such, this neither a) picks up the story of the original song or b) pits the ladies against each other." The Guardian journalist Michael Cragg noted that the hype behind the song was big, however, he expressed that it actually "sounds disappointing." He continued, "while 'The Boy is Mine' brilliantly played the two singers off against each other, fuelling the supposed rivalry the song itself generated, 'It All Belongs to Me' is a fairly rudimentary 'man's done me wrong and he needs to leave' mid-paced strumalong." HitFix blogger Chris Eggertsen rated the song a D+, saying that it has been many years since "The Boy is Mine" came out, and wondered if people would actually care about a Brandy/Monica reunion. Eggertsen also noted that the song's production sounded quite dated, and finished his review saying that both singers will need a stronger single for a real comeback. Amanda Dobbins of New York said the track is basically a "karaoke-friendly answer" to "Irreplaceable", "though B&M are more concerned with itemizing what, exactly, is still theirs (clothes, cars, rings, and, hilariously, that Macbook) than directing the gentleman where to put his things."

== Music video ==
=== Background ===
RCA Records commissioned a music video to be directed by Chris Robinson. According to Rap-Up, the video was filmed at a luxurious house in the Los Angeles area. Brandy described it to Rolling Stone as a girl empowerment video, "sort of like a 'Thelma & Louise'," and revealed that, according to the storyline, they're "both in dysfunctional relationships, ... helping each other through both situations." She also commented that Waiting to Exhale (1995) was another inspiration for the music video. On February 13, 2012, Monica shared two pictures from behind the scenes. One of the pictures features Monica wearing a shirt with a picture of Whitney Houston. On March 2, 2012, a thirty-second preview of the video was posted online. A behind the scenes teaser was also posted on MTV Hive, while VH1 News released an interview with both singers during the filing of video. The full video premiered on March 5, 2012, through music channel VH1 at 11 PM ET/PT.

=== Synopsis ===
Brandy (left) and Monica (right) standing next to a car in the music video

The video opens with Brandy giving her fictional boyfriend a watch. However, the couple starts to fight after a few seconds, leading Brandy to drive the boyfriend to the middle of a road and leaving him alone. She then changes her Facebook status to 'Single'. Next, we see Monica giving her lover a new car. The scene then cuts to both having a discussion on their room, that ends with Monica cutting her boyfriend's necktie with a pair of scissors. The singers are then seen together dressing black leather clothes in a bathroom. As they leave, they carry a MacBook, a golden box and a suit, while placing the items inside the car Monica had previously given her lover. As the lover watches both from afar, Monica and Brandy wave him goodbye. They leave on Brandy's car, as the other explodes in front of Monica's old house. The video ends with a dedication to Whitney Houston. Some of the video shows scenes of Brandy and Monica sitting the same way from Brandy's left and Monica's right with their chairs, Monica singing in the light with a hat and black clothing and later a beret headband from the 70s, Brandy and Monica singing in their dress and signing behind the mirror with the light.

=== Reception ===
A Rap-Up reviewer and Byron Flistch of MTV praised the looks of both singers in the video. Flistch also commented, "not that we promote arson or anything, but we're just super happy Brandy and Monica are getting along – clearly, no man is worth holding on to a years-old grudge." According to Fashion Bomb Daily, Brandy was styled in a Versace Barocco Printed Silk-Twill Shirt that costed $1,275. Robbie Daw of Idolator also said that Monica and Brandy looked "stunning", but added that the plotline of the video could have been more creative. Maritess Calabria of RyanSeacrest.com thought that the video reflects on how women can be powerful in terms of money in a relationship, and completed, "just as easily as they give it, they can take it all away." Chris Eggertsen of Hitfix gave the video a negative review, and said "that it feels as lifeless and pre-fab as the song it's been built around." New York journalist Amanda Dobbins said that the video "isn't exactly a barn-burner" as the song either, and joked that a large part of the production's budget "was blown on the Macbook in question."

== Promotion ==
Brandy and Monica first performed the song together on The Tonight Show with Jay Leno. Rickey Minor and Kim Burse, who previously worked with Beyoncé and Ciara, were among the creative team of the performance. Robbie Daw of Idolator considered the performance as impressive and soulful, noting, however, that listeners seemed to prefer the singers feuding days. Michael O'Connell and Shirley Halperin of The Hollywood Reporter thought the performance was nostalgic, and concluded that "the two can also still give a pretty good live performance." A reviewer of Rap-Up said that Monica and Brandy "put their powerful pipes on display" on the presentation. The singers were also going to perform the track on Clive Davis' Pre-Grammy Party in 2012, along with "The Boy is Mine". When asked about the performance, Brandy revealed that she was scared, "I'm just scared of everybody in that room. I think that's why it's going to be a really cool performance because I do a little bit better when I'm afraid." Monica, on the other hand, revealed that she "don't get nervous. I thank God for that because I don't know what I would do if I did." However, following Houston's passing, the performance was cancelled.

To further promote the song, Monica and Brandy did several appearances on television and radio. The singers visited BET's 106 & Park to premiere the music video for the show and talk about their tour, comeback and Whitney Houston. They also visited WWPR-FM's The Breakfast Club, and participated on VH1's Big Morning Buzz Live, where they played a game inspired by the song. They picked items out of a box and said which of them it belonged to. During their promotional tour, both singers were interviewed on SiriusXM's Sway in the Morning, while Brandy appeared on a Reebok Classics Icons campaign during a New York Knicks game on the week of March 23, 2012. They also did an intimate interview and performance in Atlanta for V-103's Conversation/Soul Session. Aside the performances of "It All Belongs to Me" and "The Boy is Mine", Brandy did a tribute to Houston, and performed a live cover of "I Will Always Love You" (1992). More performances of the song occurred on Good Morning America and Live! with Kelly. Monica performed a solo rendition of "It All Belongs to Me" during a promotional concert held by AOL on April 5, 2012.

== Track listings ==
Digital download
No.	Title	Writer(s)	Producer(s)	Length
1.	"It All Belongs to Me" (album version)	Rico Love; Earl Hood; Eric Goudy II	Love; Earl & E	4:04

Digital download – remix
No.	Title	Writer(s)	Producer(s)	Length
1.	"It All Belongs to Me" (High Level radio mix)	Love; Hood; Goudy	Love; Earl & E; High Level^{[a]}	4:18

UK digital download
No.	Title	Writer(s)	Producer(s)	Length
1.	"It All Belongs to Me" (radio edit)	Love; Hood; Goudy	Love; Earl & E	4:04
2.	"It All Belongs to Me" (album version)	Love; Hood; Goudy	Love; Earl & E	4:04
3.	"Anything (To Find You)" (featuring Rick Ross)	Cainon Lamb; Henry Fuse; Jazmine Sullivan; Miguel Castro; Missy Elliott; William Roberts	Elliott; Lamb	3:42

Sample credits

- "Anything (To Find You)" contains a portion of the composition "Who Shot Ya?", written by Christopher Wallace, Sean Combs, Nashiem Sa-Allah Myrick, Herbert Magidson and Allie Wrubel; contains a portion of the composition "You're All I Need to Get By", written by Nickolas Ashford and Valerie Simpson; contains a sample from "I'm Afraid the Masquerade Is Over", as performed by David Porter.

Notes

- ^{^a} denotes additional producer

== Chart performance ==
On the chart issue dated February 23, 2012, "It All Belongs to Me" debuted at number 66 on Billboard's Hot R&B/Hip-Hop Songs. It peaked at number 23.

Chart performance for "It All Belongs to Me"
Chart (2012)	Peak position
Netherlands (Urban Top 100)	84
South Korea (Gaon International Chart)	53
US Hot R&B/Hip-Hop Songs (Billboard)	23

== Release history ==
Release dates and formats for "It All Belongs to Me"
Region	Date	Format	Label	Ref
Various	February 13, 2012	Digital download; streaming	RCA	
