= Grace (Mandy Capristo album) =

Studio album by Mandy Capristo
- Released: April 27, 2012
- Recorded: Various: Hamburg, Germany (Lexland Studios); Berlin, Germany (Nucleus Studios); Cologne, Germany (Maarweg Studios)
- Length: 48:55
- Language: English • Italian
- Labels: EMI; Starwatch
- Producers: David Eriksen; Toby Gad; David Jost; Peter Keller; Lamb; John McLaughlin; Ruben Rodriguez; Will Simms; Dave Thomas; Twin

Singles from Grace
- 1. "The Way I Like It" Released: 13 April 2012; 2. "Closer" Released: 31 August 2012

Grace is the debut studio album by German singer Mandy Capristo. It was released on April 27, 2012, through Starwatch Entertainment and EMI Music on April 27, 2012, following the breakup of her band Monrose in 2010. Recorded in Hamburg, Cologne and Berlin, she worked with a number of different musicians on material for the album, including German producers Toby Gad and David Jost as well as American producer Cainon Lamb and Swedish production team Twin.

The album received mixed to positive reviews, with critics praising Capristo's vocal versatility, emotional delivery, and the album's variety, while criticizing its lack of originality and memorable hit songs. Commercially, it debuted at number eight on the German Albums Chart and reached the top thirty of the chart in Austria and Switzerland. Grace produced two singles, including the top 20 hit "The Way I Like It", and earned Capristo a nomination for Best Female Rock/Pop Act – National at the Echo Music Prize.

== Background and development ==
Capristo's first solo album was originally planned to be released in summer 2011, but the singer later stated that the album would not be released during the summer, as she felt that the album was not yet ready to be released, and she wanted to make sure the finished product was something she could be proud of. During the album's recording sessions in 2011, she was asked to record a song with German singer Peter Maffay named "Die Zeit hält nur in Träumen an" (English: "The time stops only in dreams") for the Tabaluga musical. Capristo got the role of "Lilli" for the musical. Their first television performance was on October 8, 2011 on Wetten, dass..?.

In December 2011, Capristo stated on her official Facebook page that her debut album was set to be released in February 2012, while not revealing any further details about the album. She said it was definitely a pop album, but was also mixed. She further elaborated that there were a lot of songs to pick from, but she chose the songs which were 100% "Mandy Capristo" and said that every song on the album she has experienced in her life.

After the collaboration with Peter Maffay, Capristo headed back in the studio and focused on her upcoming album. When asked about the title and concept of her debut album, Capristo said: "The album production was, for me personally, the biggest challenge I have ever mastered. It was the most intense and emotional time of my life. Every tear, every sleepless night and all criticism I put it as an experience in my songs." The title of the album "Grace" came from her middle name. The inspiration for the album came from dance, pop and R&B artists like Beyoncé, Rihanna, Nicole Scherzinger and Destiny's Child. The album mixes pop music with dance, and electro-pop influences. To some extent, even hip-hop, teen pop included, and reggae elements.

== Composition and recording ==
In November 2010, shortly after the disbandment of her band Monrose, Capristo revealed that she was planning to kick off recording sessions for her first studio album. Starwatch consulted a variety of producers to work with her on new music, including German producers Toby Gad and David Jost as well as American producer Cainon Lamb and Swedish production team Twin, among others. Songwriters on the album include Julie Frost, Pam Sheyne, Pixie Lott, Ina Wroldsen, Shelly Peiken, Greg Wells, and Amie Miriello. Capristo stated that "It Don't Matter", "Risque", "Hurricane" and "Grace" are her favorite songs on the album.

The album begins with "Allow Me". This song has rap elements, is an uptempo number and begins with: "My name is Mandy, second name is Grace!" [...] I know I can make it ". The second song of the album is the first single "The Way I Like It", lyrically the song is about sex. In Mandy's eyes, the meaning for her is "to do what you like and what you want". "Overrated" is a mid-tempo song, which has Contemporary R&B influences. The song is about the lonely time as a single person, if you have just "split up with your partner": "I'm on my own - I never thought that I would say this, single life is overrated! Alone is overrated! The message of the next song "Sing" is that all the feelings and pain is to sing from the soul. "Hurricane" is one of the "powerful song" of the album and is about the calm before the storm. The chorus is catchy: "He left me, when he walked away, this love - his love is like a hurricane" striking is the constant change of pace from slow to fast. "Otherside" is a cover of the Red Hot Chili Peppers, she stated that she covered this song because her brother is a fan of the track from the band, so Capristo decided to cover this song for the album. She revealed "Grace" is her most personal song, which was co-written by herself. The song is dedicated to her family. At the end of the song there are Italian lyrics.

== Promotion ==
- The lead single from Grace, "The Way I Like It", which was produced by David Jost, was the released in Germany on April 13, 2012 with the acoustic version. The Way I Like It has, to date charted at number 11 in Germany, 29 in Switzerland and 30 in Austria. It spent three weeks in the top twenty in Germany. To date, the single's music video has received over 510,000 views on MyVideo and the acoustic video has received over 2,000,000 views on YouTube.
- The second single from Grace, is Closer, which was announced on Mandy's official Facebook. The single was released on August 31. The song charted at 64 on the German single chart and 73 in Austria

== Critical reception ==
Professional ratings
Review scores
Source	Rating
CD-Bewertungen	7/10 stars
laut.de	2/5 stars
Max	3/5 stars
Monsters and Critics	3/6 stars

Grace received mixed to positive reviews by music critics. Max editor Martin Haldenmair rated the album three stars out of five stars and described Grace as Capristo's "new business card." He felt that "there are fast songs, slow songs, simple songs and some that have undergone extreme electronic optimization. If you want to find out what the singer can do: Grace shows every variation, shows a demanding, self-confident artist and an emotional, vulnerable soul." Katharina Raab, writing for Monsters and Critics, noted that "Grace is dominated by opulently arranged dramas and attempted eroticism instead of originality. In pompous ballads like "Overrated," "Side Effects" or "It Don't Matter," Capristo, with a velvet voice, once again suffers through the romantic disappointments of her young life. Only to transform into an insatiable nymph again in catchy pop songs like "Intense" or "Closer"."

Amelie Köppl from laut.de gave the album two stars out of five stars and wrote: "Grace is a well-intentioned debut, but unfortunately it also proves that the new style envisioned by the Monrose chick doesn't pay off over the length of the album [...]The best songs are "The Way I Like It" and "It Don't Matter", but the acoustic-versions are much better."CD-Bewertungen.de gave the album 7 stars out of 10 stars and praised the variety of the songs and the depth and also Capristo's passion, however, they criticized that there was no distinctive catchy tune. Altogether, her debut is a personal work and has become an interesting start for her solo career, which has just really started.

== Chart performance ==
Grace debuted and peaked at number eight on the German Albums Chart in the week of 11 May 2012.

== Track listing ==
Grace track listing
No.	Title	Writer(s)	Producer(s)	Length
1.	"Allow Me"	Cainon Lamb; Julie Frost	Lamb	3:23
2.	"The Way I Like It"	David Jost; Joacim Persson; Johan Alkenäs; Niclas Molinder	Jost; Twin	3:14
3.	"Overrated"	Will Simms; Debbie French; Derek McDonals	Simms	3:45
4.	"Side Effects"	Pam Sheyne; Toby Gad; Pixie Lott	Simms	3:30
5.	"Sing"	Anthony Galatis; Mark Frisch	Dave Thomas; John McLaughlin	3:07
6.	"Hurricane"	David Eriksen; Ina Wroldsen	Eriksen	3:50
7.	"Closer"	Robin Grubert; Martin Tingvall	Peter Keller	4:02
8.	"It Don't Matter"	Mathias Wollo; Awa Manneh	Simms	4:43
9.	"Risque"	Sharon Vaughn; Sebastian Thott; Didrik Thott	Simms	4:45
10.	"Intense"	Shelly Peiken; Greg Wells; Amie Miriello	Thomas; McLaughlin	3:58
11.	"Otherside"	Michael Peter Balzary; John Frusciante; Anthony Kiedis; Chad Smith	White	5:54
12.	"Grace"	Mandy Capristo; Keith "Elliott" Munnerlyn; Ruben Rodriguez; Sebastian Henzl; Rino Galiano	Rodriguez	4:44
Total length:				48:55

iTunes bonus track
No.	Title	Writer(s)	Producer(s)	Length
13.	"Pulse"	Peiken; Kasia Livingston; Fraser T. Smith	Smith	2:54

== Charts ==
Chart performance for Grace
Chart (2012)	Peak position
Austrian Albums (Ö3 Austria)	28
German Albums (Offizielle Top 100)	8
Swiss Albums (Schweizer Hitparade)	21

== Release history ==
Release history for Grace
Region	Date	Format	Label	Ref.
Various	April 27, 2012	CD; digital download	EMI; Starwatch	
