= Without You (Monica song) =

Single by Monica

from the album New Life
- Released: May 8, 2012
- Studio: No Excuses Studios (Santa Monica, California)
- Length: 4:09
- Label: RCA
- Songwriters: Jamal Jones; Mansur Zafr; India Boodram; Jazmyn Michel; Kesia Hollins
- Producers: Polow da Don; Mansur Zafr

Monica singles chronology
"It All Belongs to Me" (2012)	"Without You" (2012)	"Just Right for Me" (2015)

"Without You" is a song by American recording artist Monica. It was written by India Boodram, Kesia Hollins, Jamal Jones, Jazmyn Michel, and Mansur Zafr, with production helmed by her cousin Polow da Don, along with Zafr, for her seventh studio album, New Life, released in 2012. A dedication to her husband, NBA basketball player Shannon Brown, "Without You" is a ballad which features a thunderous beat and light synth riffs. The fourth single from New Life, it was serviced to rhythmic US radio on May 8, 2012 and reached number 91 on the US Hot R&B/Hip-Hop Songs chart.

== Background and composition ==
"Without You" was written by Jamal "Polow da Don" Jones, Mansur Zafr, India Boodram, Jazmyn Michel, and Kesia Hollins, with production by Polow da Don and Zafr, and recorded at No Excuses Studios in Santa Monica, California. It was mixed by Manny Marroquin with further assistance from Erik Madrid and Chris Galland. The track, along with Jermaine Dupri-crafted album cut "Amazing", was specifically written and dedicated to Monica's husband, NBA basketball player Shannon Brown, and brought to her by da Don. "I think for him, he wanted to help me find and create a song that would say exactly how I feel about my husband," she noted in an interview with Yahoo! Music. Speaking with Rap-Up, the singer further explained the importance of the song for her. “It was an important song to me on the album because it was the song that I did specifically for [Shannon],” she said. “[Polow] was able to make a song that was a true testament to the love I have for my husband now.”

== Critical reception ==
"Without You" received mainly mixed to positive reviews from music critics. In her review of New Life, Erika Ramirez of Billboard said: "Monica [...] adds some throbbing synths and twinkling piano on another "I love my man" cut. Remains solidly in the R&B vein, however, lacking the pop touch that made "Why I Love You So Much" or "Angel of Mine" cross over in their heyday. Generally critical of the album itself, Jonathan Keefe of Slant Magazine wrote: "The melody of "Without You" allows Monica to show off the breadth of her range, but with its reverb-heavy percussion line, the track's production immediately recalls—and pales in comparison to — Beyoncé's "Halo" and Kelly Clarkson's "Already Gone." But while it's both a dated knockoff and a phoned-in effort from Polow da Don, the song is still one of the better tracks on a messy, underwhelming set." Boston Globe noted that "showing off her vocal range on "Without You," Monica reminds us why she's still relevant."

== Format and track listing ==
- Digital download
1. "Without You" – 4:09

== Credits and personnel ==
- Composer - Jamal Jones, Mansur Zafr, India Boodram, Jazmyn Michel, Kesia Hollins
- Production – Polow da Don, Mansur Zafr
- Keyboards, strings, bass, piano – Brian Kennedy
- Bass – Dan Rockett
- Recording – Jay Stevenson
- Mixing – Manny Marroquin
- Mixing assistance – Erik Madrid, Chris Galland

== Charts ==
Chart performance for "Without You"
Chart (2012)	Peak position
US Adult R&B Songs (Billboard)	27
US Hot R&B/Hip-Hop Songs (Billboard)	91

== Release history ==
Release dates and formats for "Without You"
Country	Date	Format	Label	Ref.
United States	May 8, 2012	Digital download; rhythmic radio	RCA	
