= New Life (Monica album) =

Studio album by Monica
- Released: April 6, 2012
- Genre: R&B
- Length: 42:52
- Label: RCA
- Producers: Monica Brown; Tha Bizness; Bryan-Michael Cox; Jermaine Dupri; Earl & E; Missy Elliott; Lamb; Rico Love; Pierre Medor; Mr. Morris; Polow da Don; Pop & Oak; Salaam Remi; D. Smith

Monica chronology
Still Standing (2010)	New Life (2012)	Code Red (2015)

Singles from New Life
- 1. "Anything (To Find You)" Released: August 2, 2011; 2. "Until It's Gone" Released: September 27, 2011; 3. "It All Belongs to Me" Released: February 14, 2012; 4. "Without You" Released: May 8, 2012

New Life is the seventh studio album by American singer Monica, released by RCA Records on April 6, 2012. It marked the singer's debut release with the label following the dissolution of her former label, J Records in October 2011. A musical continuation of her commercially successful previous album Still Standing (2010), Monica began working on the album only weeks after the release of the former. She returned to work with frequent collaborators; writers and producers including Bryan-Michael Cox, Jermaine Dupri, Missy Elliott, and Cainon Lamb, as well as such as singer and songwriter Rico Love, whose songs replaced much of her cousin, producer Polow da Don's original material.

New Life is predominately a contemporary R&B album with major influences of pop and soul. The album's lyrics explore the complexities of romantic relationships and stages of love, much of which was inspired by her marriage to professional basketball player Shannon Brown and her relocation to Arizona. Guest vocalists on the album are rappers Rick Ross and Wale, as well as singer Mary J. Blige. Singer and actress Brandy, who had previously collaborated with Monica on their 1998 number-one single "The Boy Is Mine" (1998), co-performs on the single "It All Belongs to Me" as its spiritual successor.

New Life was met with mixed reception from music critics, many of whom praised Monica's vocal performances and the album's trend-detaching nature, but found the material too generic and cliché-addled. Upon its release, the album debuted at number four on the US Billboard 200 and number two on Billboard's Top R&B/Hip-Hop Albums chart, selling 69,000 copies. With first-month sales of 116,400 copies, New Life sold significantly less than its predecessors. Its singles—"Anything (To Find You)", "Until It's Gone", "It All Belongs to Me" and "Without You"—each failed to enter the Billboard Hot 100, but lingered on narrower charts such as Hot R&B/Hip Hop Songs.

== Background and recording ==
Monica released her sixth studio album, Still Standing, in 2010. Chronicled by her BET reality series of the same name which was aired between October 2009 and January 2010, the album marked her third album on J Records following the renewal of her contract in October 2007. Released to critical and commercial success, it debuted at number two on the US Billboard 200 chart, selling 184,000 in its first week, and reached the top of the Top R&B/Hip-Hop Albums chart. The same year, Still Standing was certified gold by the Recording Industry Association of America (RIAA) for shipments of 500,000 copies in the United States and has sold 474,000 copies to date. The album also garnered a Grammy Award nomination for Best R&B Album. Her biggest commercial success, the album was viewed as a humble comeback from Monica.

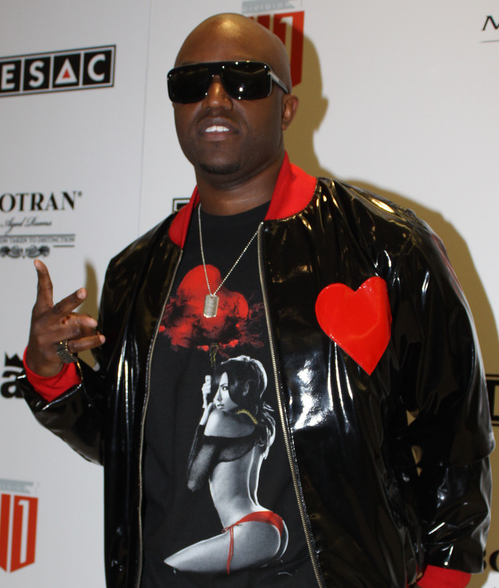
Additional songs, recorded with singer Rico Love, replaced much of the album's original material.

Monica began recording the album during the third quarter of 2010 – just weeks after the release of Still Standing. She recorded several songs in Los Angeles with longtime collaborator, producer, and cousin Polow da Don, who was consulted to executive produce the effort. Together, she and Polow worked on what was expected to be the bulk of the album as she envisioned creating the "meat" of the album's center with him. Monica hoped that as with Still Standing, determining an album title would help find a direction for the project, and she intended to finish the album by mid-2011. As with previous albums, the singer reteamed with frequent contributors such as Bryan-Michael Cox, Missy Elliott, Jazmine Sullivan, and Cainon Lamb but also worked with a group of several new musicians, songwriters, and producers. It was however not until January 2012 that she recorded with other producers apart from Polow, when she entered studio sessions with Pop & Oak and D. Smith to record "Catch Me" and "Time to Move On".

Most of the album's songs were recorded at the Audio Vision Studios and Circle House Recordings in Miami, Florida. Monica recorded "Cry" at the Chalice Recording Studios in Hollywood, and "Without You" at the No Excuses Studios in Santa Monica, California. Sessions for "New Life (Intro)" and "Amazing" took place at Doppler Studios and South Side Studios in Atlanta, Georgia. Initially expected to be released as her fifth album with J Records, much of the album was eventually recorded under RCA Records after the restructuring of the RCA Music Group in October 2011 which shuttered J along with sister labels Jive and Arista. Originally scheduled for a November 2011 release, final recording sessions for New Life with producer Hit-Boy took place in October. On November 2, 2011, Monica took to Twitter to announce that the album would be postponed and that she along with the label was planning to restructure "the entire plan for the album". Within the next months, she resumed recording for the album and booked additional studio sessions with Rico Love and co-producers Earl & E, Mr. Morris, and Pierre Medor to retool New Life.

== Music and lyrics ==
A R&B album, New Life features upbeat pop songs, hip hop-textured midtempo tracks, and anthemic ballads. Along with contemporary urban sounds, its music incorporates soft reggae elements, muted gospel, and, particularly in Elliott's songs, heavy soul influences that fit with the quiet storm radio format. Music journalist Tuyet Nguyen from The A.V. Club noted that the album is distinct from the electronic dance music–dominated leanings that many R&B singers adopted during the late 2000s to early 2010s, and characterized it as "a backwards-looking effort detached from contemporary trends", whose "lack of autotuned verses and dubstep bass drops are a welcome move away from gimmicky contemporary production." Similarly, Allison Wallace, writer for The Daily Californian, remarked that New Life contained "thick, sultry body-grinding R&B beats and fluttering falsetto solos that leave autotuned popstars like Ke$ha stammering."

Monica sings with impeccable deep alto vocals throughout the album. Erika Ramirez of Billboard asserted that in New Life, Monica "chooses passion over pride and lets us seep in her vulnerability. Her deep, emotive voice pilots her when the singer dives down to pain's core." Slant Magazine's Jonathan Keefe found that New Life reflected Monica's intention "to develop a husky, robust lower register that makes her voice even more distinctive." Music journalist Ernest Hardy stated that Monica's "vocal power and masterful control of her instrument make her a singer's singer" in the wake of her idol and mentor Whitney Houston. According to AllMusic's Matt Collar, the singer "recalls both her '90s heyday and the burnished, swaggering approach of such icons as Mary J. Blige and Toni Braxton." He felt that this was especially evident on such tracks as "Daddy's Good Girl", "Anything (To Find You)" and the ballad "Until It's Gone".

== Songs ==
"It All Belongs to Me" is a mid-tempo R&B ballad that features singer Brandy and ends in a melismatic form. Lyrically, the song is a female empowerment anthem in which both singers claim their belongings as they leave their abusive boyfriends behind. The chorus has pop cultural references to MacBook and Facebook. "Daddy's Good Girl", is a musical pledge of devotion, in which Monica calls for love's assurance, singing "As long as I know you got that love for me, I'll be g.o.o.d." "Man Who Has Everything" is Caribbean-tinged track about how money can't buy love. It has a reggae-inspired arrangement. On "Big Mistake", Monica sings about heartbreak and moving beyond over-finger snapping and a cappella backing vocals, assuring "make no mistake, you won't my mistake no more."

"Take a Chance" featuring rapper Wale depicts both parties of a love story in which Monica declared that she Is ready for more, while her lover stands still with hesitance. Airy and featherweight, it features an understated synthpop instrumental, that fades into the background during the verses before rising into a layered affair for the chorus. "Without You" is a ballad and musical dedication to Monica's husband, NBA basketball player Shannon Brown. It features a reverb-heavy percussion line, throbbing synth riffs, and twinkling piano sounds. "Until It's Gone" is a soulful, anthemic ballad built upon percussion with piano chords that mix a deft synth with a drum program studio vibe. Lyrically, the song explores the breakdown of an old relationship. "Amazing", which deals with loyalty, is a mid-tempo slow jam that mixes distracting, amelodic electronic bleeps with Monica's vocal track.

"Cry" is a retro-soul ballad about finding strength in crying while in a loving relationship. It features background vocals by its composer, singer Jazmine Sullivan. On slow-burning "Time to Move On", Monica sings with seasoned, emotive voice soars and lung-bursting harmonies. A light-handed use of Stax-era vintage sounds, it mixes her vocals with clean bluesy guitar riffs and gospel choir backups. "Anything (To Find You)" is an uptempo song, which exhibits elements of the early – to mid-1990s hip hop soul music and samples "Who Shot Ya?" performed by The Notorious B.I.G. and Diddy, while using an interpolation of Marvin Gaye and Tammi Terrell's "You're All I Need to Get By". Its original version also featured American rapper Lil' Kim next to Rick Ross.

== Titling and artwork ==
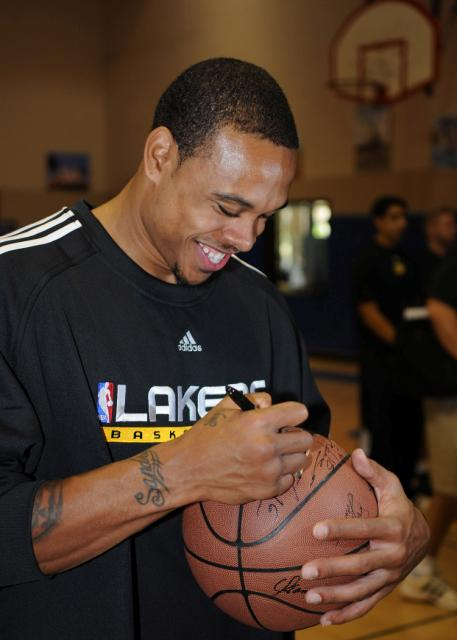
Husband Shannon Brown, inspired the album's title.

Monica stated in an interview with BET's 106 & Park that while she considered New Life a continuation of her 2010 album Still Standing, the album marked a turning point in her personal life. "We all as humans sometimes are fearful of what’s ahead. So New Life is just saying embrace the new things that can come into your atmosphere. It can be great for you. So as I embrace new love, new music, new people, new things. It's just been an amazing experience. So I named it New Life just as a representation of that." She also stated that her separation from rapper Rodney "Rocko" Hill, her marriage to professional basketball player Shannon Brown in November 2010, and their subsequent relocation from Atlanta to Arizona contributed to that idea.

As with Still Standing, the singer decided on the album's official title still during the pre-production process. Revealed via Twitter, Monica wrote on her account on December 16, 2010: "Have a great day twit-fam. Don't be afraid of new things, new people, new opportunities, or new love. It just may give you a New Life." The album's official cover (standard version) was revealed on Amazon on November 3, 2011. A simple head-shot, the album cover was photographed by Taiwan-born photographer Yu Tsai on August 17, 2011. The cover art for the deluxe edition, photographed by Derek Blanks, was shown after the album's retooling on March 19, 2012, and features another close shot of the singer's face.

== Singles ==
New Life was promoted by four singles. "Anything (To Find You)", a collaboration with rapper Rick Ross, was the first single to be released from the album on August 2, 2011, surrounding the controversy over the removal of Lil' Kim's vocals, who had appeared on the song original version along with Ross. Its accompanying music video was shot on August 18, 2010, by frequent collaborator Chris Robinson and premiered on September 11, 2011. The track peaked at number twenty-five on the US Billboard Hot R&B/Hip-Hop Songs chart but was eventually not included on the track listing of the album's standard version.

"Until It's Gone" was released for digital download on September 27, 2011, as the album's second single. The song impacted urban mainstream and adult contemporary radio on October 3 and 4, 2011, respectively, and peaked at number twenty-two on the Hot R&B/Hip Hop Songs chart. Monica reunited with director Diane Martel for the music video. The video premiered Monica's Vevo on October 24, 2011, to coincide with Monica's thirty-first birthday. "It All Belongs to Me", the album's third offering and official leading single, a duet with fellow recording artist Brandy conceived after New Life's delay and subsequent rework, was released digitally on February 14, 2012. It reached number 23 on the Billboard Hot R&B/Hip-Hop Songs chart. The accompanying music video was directed by Robinson and premiered on VH1 on March 5, 2012. The album's final single, "Without You", impacted the US urban AC radio on May 8, 2012.

== Critical response ==
Professional ratings
Aggregate scores
Source	Rating
Metacritic	58/100
Review scores
Source	Rating
About.com	3.5/5 stars
AllMusic	3.5/5 stars
The A.V. Club	C+
Entertainment Weekly	C+
Los Angeles Times	2/4 stars
NME	4/10
Slant Magazine	2/5 stars

New Life received generally mixed reviews from music critics. At Metacritic, which assigns a normalized rating out of 100 to reviews from mainstream critics, the album received an average score of 58, based on seven reviews, which indicates "mixed or average reviews." Adam Markovitz of Entertainment Weekly criticized its "cheesy choruses and outdated tun," and called the album "a thoroughly last-millennium set of self-help ballads about starting over ('Take a Chance') and finding strength in tears ('Cry'), set to the kind of cheesy slow-jam beats that were hot back during Monica's previous life as a '90s teen phenom." Los Angeles Times writer Ernest Hardy criticized the songwriting and called the album "a slickly produced collection of largely generic, meandering songs about self-affirmation in the wake of heartache and romantic disillusionment." Tuyet Nguyen of The A.V. Club commented that it "engages [Monica's] vocal strengths without ever really challenging them" and stated: "New Life isn't about broadening horizons so much as it is about realizing a comfortable niche."

Although he found it "beautifully sung and slickly produced," Ken Capobianco of The Boston Globe also called the album "numbingly predictable" and commented that Monica "deserves better material than the generic songs she works with here." Ben Cardew of NME noted "limpness" in its songs and wrote that "there are far too many limp ballads to excite." Slant Magazine's Jonathan Keefe found the album "scattered and uneven", and accused Monica's collaborators of disserving her, writing that New Life "squanders Monica's on-point vocal turns on some cliché-addled songs and embarrassingly cheap-sounding production." However, AllMusic editor Matt Collar found Monica's voice to be "in top form" and complimented her "saucy, spirited, and soulful vibe," writing that it "makes New Life such a refreshing and focused female soul album." Allison Stewart from The Washington Post called the album an "offering that's heavy on hard-luck ballads and light on snappy, elbow-throwing joints," while TheWrap critic Chris Willman found that "Monica's producers and writers seem to be saving their best game for some other prematurely aged R&B princess. Everything old in New Life just sounds old again."

== Commercial performance ==
New Life debuted and peaked at number four on the US Billboard 200 chart, with first-week sales of 69,000 copies. In total, it has spent 10 consecutive weeks on the Billboard 200. On the Billboard Top R&B/Hip-Hop Albums chart, it debuted at number two, spending 28 consecutive weeks on the chart. This marked Monica's fifth top-ten album on the Billboard 200 and sixth on the Top R&B/Hip-Hop Albums chart. In its second week, the album slid with a 70% decrease of 11 spots to number 15, selling 22,000 copies. In its fourth week, the album sold a total of 116,400 copies. By September 2015, the album had sold 196,000 copies in the United States. In South Korea, New Life peaked at number 70 on the South Korean Albums chart, meanwhile in the United Kingdom it peaked at number 20 on the UK R&B Albums Chart.

== Track listing ==
New Life track listing
No.	Title	Writer(s)	Producer(s)	Length
1.	"New Life (Intro)" (featuring Mary J. Blige)	Monica Brown; Cainon Lamb; Anthony Randolph; Raymond Gordon	Lamb	1:29
2.	"It All Belongs to Me" (with Brandy)	Rico Love; Earl Hood; Eric Goudy II	Love; Earl & E	4:04
3.	"Daddy’s Good Girl"	Love; Goudy II; Hood; Danny Morris	Love; Earl & E; Mr. Morris	4:39
4.	"Man Who Has Everything"	Love; Goudy II; Hood; Pierre Medor	Love; Earl & E; Medor	3:55
5.	"Big Mistake"	Lamb; Randolph	Lamb	3:49
6.	"Take a Chance" (featuring Wale)	Love; Hood; Goudy II; Olubowale Akintimehin	Love; Earl & E	3:44
7.	"Without You"	Jamal Jones; Mansur Zafr; India Boodram; Jazmyn Michel; Kesia Hollins	Polow da Don; Zafr	4:09
8.	"Until It's Gone"	Melissa Elliott; Lamb; Jazmine Sullivan; Randolph; Thomas Bell; Linda Epstein; Scott Sterling; Lawrence Parker	Missy Elliott; Lamb^{[a]}	3:44
9.	"Amazing"	Jermaine Dupri; Bryan-Michael Cox; Crystal Johnson	Dupri; Cox	4:03
10.	"Cry"	Salaam Remi; Sullivan	Remi	3:44
11.	"Time to Move On"	D. Smith	Smith	4:29
12.	"New Life (Outro)"	Lamb; Randolph; Gordon; Brown	Lamb	0:58
Total length:				42:47

Deluxe edition bonus tracks
No.	Title	Writer(s)	Producer(s)	Length
13.	"Breathe"	Lamb; Gordon; Taurian Osbourne	Lamb; Ray Ray	3:00
14.	"In 3D"	Lamb; Brown; Osbourne	Lamb	3:55
15.	"Catch Me"	Tiwa Savage; Warren "Oak" Felder; Andrew "Pop" Wansel; Randy Edelman	Pop & Oak	3:08
16.	"Anything (To Find You)" (featuring Rick Ross)	Elliott; Lamb; Sullivan; William Roberts II; Christopher Wallace; Sean Combs; Nashiem Sa-Allah Myrick; Herbert Magidson; Allie Wrubel; Nickolas Ashford; Valerie Simpson	Elliott; Lamb^{[a]}	3:42

Digital deluxe edition bonus track
No.	Title	Writer(s)	Producer(s)	Length
17.	"It All Belongs to Me" (with Brandy) (High Level Club Mix)	Love; Hood; Goudy II	Love; Earl & E	7:40

Notes

- ^{^a} signifies a co-producer

Sample credits

- "Until It's Gone" contains a sample from "I Don't Want to Lose You" written by Thomas Bell and Linda Epstein, as performed by The Spinners; and "9mm Goes Bang" written by Scott Sterling and Lawrence Parker, as performed by Boogie Down Productions.
- "Cry" contains a sample from "Igloo Love" written and performed by Salaam Remi.
- "Catch Me" contains a sample from "Isn't It a Shame" as performed by Labelle, written by Randy Edelman.
- "Anything (To Find You)" contains a portion of the composition "Who Shot Ya?", written by Christopher Wallace, Sean Combs, Nashiem Sa-Allah Myrick, Herbert Magidson and Allie Wrubel; contains a portion of the composition "You're All I Need to Get By", written by Nickolas Ashford and Valerie Simpson; contains a sample from "I'm Afraid the Masquerade Is Over", as performed by David Porter.

== Personnel ==
Managerial

- Melinda Dancil – album producer
- Peter Edge – album producer
- Trevor Jerideau – album producer
- Monica – album producer, executive producer
- Monica – album producer, executive producer
- Polow da Don – executive producer

Performance credits

- Rico Love – background vocals (tracks 2–4, 6)
- Monica – lead vocals (All tracks), background vocals (tracks 1, 5, 7–9, 11–12)
- Brandy Norwood – lead vocals (track 2)
- Jazmine Sullivan – background vocals (track 10)
- Wale – lead vocals (track 6)

Visuals and imagery

- Derek Blanks – photography
- Anita Marisa Boriboon – art direction, design
- Sheika Daily – make-up
- Melinda Dancil – styling
- Jocelyn Goldstein – styling
- Erwin Gorostiza – creative director
- Mylah Morales – make-up
- Cesar Ramirez – hair
- Ursula Stephens – hair
- Yu Tsai – photography

== Charts ==
=== Weekly charts ===
Weekly chart performance for New Life
Chart (2012)	Peak position
South Korean International Albums (Gaon)	70
UK R&B Albums (Official Charts)	20
US Billboard 200	4
US Top R&B/Hip-Hop Albums (Billboard)	2

=== Year-end charts ===
Year-end chart performance for New Life
Chart (2012)	Position
US Billboard 200	185
US Top R&B/Hip-Hop Albums (Billboard)	37

== Release history ==
Release dates and formats for New Life
Region	Date	Format(s)	Label(s)	Ref.
Germany	April 6, 2012	CD; digital download	Sony Music Entertainment	
Canada	April 7, 2012	CD; digital download	Sony Music Entertainment	
United States	April 10, 2012	CD; digital download	RCA	
United Kingdom	April 9, 2012	CD; digital download	RCA	
Japan	April 19, 2012	CD; digital download	Sony Music Entertainment Japan	
