= Shake Your Pom Pom =

2008 single by Missy Elliott

Single by Missy Elliott

from the album Step Up 2 the Streets
- Released: March 4, 2008
- Length: 4:00
- Label: Goldmind; Atlantic
- Songwriters: Doug Davis; Missy Elliott; Cainon Lamb; Marcus Miller; Timothy Mosley; Mark Stevens; Ricky Walters
- Producer: Timbaland

Missy Elliott singles chronology
"Ching-a-Ling" (2008)	"Shake Your Pom Pom" (2008)	"Need U Bad" (2008)

"Shake Your Pom Pom" is a song by American rapper Missy Elliott. It was written by Elliott along with frequent collaborator Cainon Lamb and Timbaland for what was supposed to be her seventh studio album Block Party, while production was helmed by the latter. The song contains interpolations from "The Show" (1985) by Doug E. Fresh & the Get Fresh Crew and "Da Butt" (1988) by Experience Unlimited Due to the inclusion of the sample, several other writers are credited as songwriters.

== Critical reception ==
In a retrospective review of the song, Steven J. Horowitz from Vulture found that "Shake Your Pom Pom" encourages "booty-clapping as Timbaland sets off what sounds like drum sticks going wild in a boiler room."

== Music video ==
A music video was produced that includes both "Shake Your Pom Pom" and "Ching-a-Ling", another Missy Elliott single. The video premiered on MTV's TRL and BET's 106 & Park on February 4, 2008. It was directed by Dave Meyers. It is the first ever 3D music video and guest-stars the Japanese hip hop dance group U-Min, known especially for their slow motion dancing and popping.

The "Ching-a-Ling" portion of the music video is set primarily with a white backdrop featuring Elliott and various background dancers, including U-Min. Other shots are interspersed throughout the video which relate to the lyrics, such as Elliott swinging on a rope swing in an autumn setting, and playing a Dance Dance Revolution-style game which uses the letters of Ching-A-Ling instead of arrows.

The "Shake Your Pom Pom" portion of the music video is set in a house party, with Elliott and others dancing before ending with Elliott and others blowing noisemakers at the camera.

== Live performances ==
"Shake Your Pom Pom" has only been performed live once and that was during the second season of America's Best Dance Crew during Week 7: Missy Elliott Challenge episode, in which the remaining four dance crews paid tribute to Elliott's videos by dancing to her songs while incorporating the innovative choreography as seen in her videos.

== Credits and personnel ==
- Craig Brockman – additional instruments
- Doug Davis – writer (sample)
- Missy Elliott – writer
- Cainon Lamb – writer
- Marcus Miller – writer (sample)
- Timothy "Timbaland" Mosley – producer, writer
- Tauian Osbourne – additional instruments
- Mark Stevens – writer (sample)
- Ricky Walters – writer (sample)

== Charts ==
Chart performance for "Shake Your Pom Pom"
Chart (2008)	Peak position
UK Singles (The Official Charts Company)	113
US Billboard Hot 100	95
US Dance Singles Sales (Billboard) with "Ching-a-Ling"	9
US Pop 100 (Billboard)	71

== Release history ==
Release history for "Shake Your Pom Pom"
Region	Date	Format(s)	Label	Ref(s)
Various	March 4, 2008	Digital download	Goldmind; Atlantic	
