= Until It's Gone (Monica song) =

2011 single by Monica

Single by Monica

from the album New Life
- Released: September 27, 2011
- Length: 3:45
- Label: RCA
- Songwriters: Melissa Elliott; Cainon Lamb; Jazmine Sullivan; Thomas Bell; Linda Epstein; Lawrence Parker; Anthony Randolph; Scott Sterling
- Producers: Missy Elliott; Lamb

Monica singles chronology
"Anything (To Find You)" (2011)	"Until It's Gone" (2011)	"It All Belongs to Me" (2012)

Music video
- "Until It's Gone" on YouTube

"Until It's Gone" is a song by American recording artist Monica. It was written and produced by longtime contributor Missy Elliott with additional penning from Jazmine Sullivan, Cainon "Lambo" Lamb, and Anthony "J.R. Smashh" Randolph for Monica's seventh studio album, New Life (2012), sampling both The Spinners' 1975 record "I Don't Want to Lose You" and Boogie Down Productions' 1987 song "9mm Goes Bang". A soulful, anthemic R&B ballad built upon percussion with piano chords, the song lyrically explores the breakdown of an old relationship.

The track was serviced to digital media stores on September 27, 2011, in the United States, replacing "Anything (To Find You)" featuring Rick Ross as the album's initial leading single. Released to mixed reviews by contemporary music critics, who praised its more sophisticated and melodically complex structure but felt it formulaic, it failed to chart on the US Billboard Hot 100, but peaked at number 22 on the component Hot R&B/Hip-Hop Songs chart. While it would remain the highest-charting single offering from the New Life album, it was later demoted and replaced by Rico Love-produced "It All Belongs to Me", a duet with R&B singer Brandy, as the album's leading single.

The music video for "Until It's Gone" was shot by director Diane Martel and filmed in the Harlem neighborhood, New York City on October 3, 2011. It premiered online on October 24, 2011, to coincide with Monica's thirty-first birthday. American actor Brian J. White and actress Malinda Williams star in the video, which centers on two characters having words in their automobile, leading to a devastating accident.

== Background and recording ==
"Until It's Gone" was written and produced by Missy Elliott, Cainon Lamb, and Jazmine Sullivan, all of which had contributed to Monica's previous singles "Everything to Me" and "Anything (To Find You)", with additional writing by Anthony Randolph. It contains elements of both The Spinners' 1975 record "I Don't Want to Lose You", penned by Thomas Bell and Linda Epstein, and Boogie Down Productions' 1987 song "9mm Goes Bang", written by band members Lawrence "KRS-One" Parker, and Scott "La Rock" Sterling. Production on the track was handled by Elliott and Lamb. While most of the music was sampled from the two songs mentioned above, Anthony "J.R. Smashh" Randolph played additional keyboards. Manny Marroquin mixed the track with assistance by Erik Madrid and Chris Galland, while Miguel "Pro" Castro assisted in the audio engineering of "Until It's Gone"; both tasks were executed at the Larrabee Sound Studio, in Universal City, California. Speaking about what motivated her to record the song, Monica said: "When it came to 'Until It's Gone,' I probably was just sharing," she said. "I was already in a sharing mood."

== Critical reception ==
"Until It's Gone" received generally mixed to positive reviews by music critics. AllMusic editor Matt Collar called the song an "anthemic ballad", benefiting from Elliott's "slick but straightforward productions that mix a deft synth and drum program studio vibe with a warm, overall earthy vibe." Mark Edward Nero from About.com felt that "Until It's Gone" gave "a few hints where Monica might be headed", and added: "The song, which has a strong piano-based melody, is a lot more sophisticated and melodically complex than anything she recorded during her The Boy is Mine days in the '90s". Music blog DJBooth.net remarked that the "heart-wrenching ballad finds heavyweight femcee Missy Elliott and co-producer Lamb once again working their magic behind the boards. Pairing reverb-drenched percussion with delicate piano chords, the collaborators craft an appropriately poignant backdrop for Monica’s soulful (and rather blunt) entreaties." Bianca Roach, writer for news agency Associated Press, felt that "sophisticated killer ballad "Until It's Gone" is proof Monica hasn't lost that golden voice." She remarked that "the raw pain in her voice hits home to give you goosebumps all over".

ThatGrapeJuice.net felt that the song was sticking to her tried-and-true formula of previous midtempo singles "So Gone" and "Everything to Me" and wrote that it "showcases the Monica fans have grown to know and love – sass, simplicity, and heartfelt vocal delivery." In her track-by-track review of New Life, Billboard magazine writer Erika Ramirez noted, "the 'You Don't Know What You Got Till It's Gone' anthem is laced with The Spinners "I Don't Want to Lose You" and Boogie Down Productions' "9 MM Goes Bang." The cut stands the best chance of breaking out amid the filler-heavy material here". Less empathetic with its production, Slant Magazine writer Jonathan Keefe found that "Missy Elliott brings nothing more to the ballad than a pedestrian beat and chintzy quiet-storm keyboards," while Tuyet Nguyen of The A.V. Club commented that "even catchy tunes, like the Missy Elliott-produced "Until It's Gone," only register for a moment before disappearing again into the recesses of the album.

== Music video ==
=== Background ===
Monica along with Malinda Williams in a sequence from the "Until It's Gone" video

The music video for "Until It's Gone" was directed by Diane Martel, and largely filmed in the Harlem neighborhood in the New York City borough of Manhattan on October 3, 2011. The video marked Martel and Monica's first collaboration since 1999's "Angel of Mine". It premiered online on October 24, 2011, to coincide with Monica's thirty-first birthday.

=== Synopsis ===
American actors Malinda Williams and Brian J. White appear in the cinematic video, which centers on a couple who suffers a devastating car accident after having words in their automobile. As the video opens, the pregnant woman is being wheeled into the hospital on a gurney, while her boyfriend seems to have escaped with a gnarly facial wound only. When Monica shows up to support her best friend and her family, including their son, she reveals her contempt for the boyfriend, implying that his infidelity — confirmed later on when provocative pictures of another woman show up on his iPhone — are to blame for the misfortune. In the end of the video, the woman dies from her injuries, leaving behind a waiting room filled with grieving loved ones.

=== Reception ===
The video was generally well–received by critics. PopCrush remarked that "Monica is certainly bringing the drama with her new video. All and all, the singer is relaying a valuable life message throughout the clip — love the one you’re with and don’t cheat on your spouse. We can dig it." Music blog ThatGrapeJuice.net wrote that "similar to the offerings of Still Standing, Mo continues to weave compelling storylines with heartfelt/emotional vocal deliveries. In an age where so many succumb to the pressures of the music industry’s tyrant electropop, Mrs. Brown stands as proof that staying true to oneself yields more long term satisfaction (and fan approval) than a minor iTunes top 10." Rap-Up magazine commended to "grab the Kleenex 'cause this one’s a tearjerker", while SoulCulture declared the clip a "deeply emotive video".

== Credits and personnel ==
- Composer – Melissa Elliott, Cainon Lamb, Jazmine Sullivan, Anthony Randoplh, Thomas Bell, Linda Epstein, Scott Sterling, Lawrence Parker
- Production – Missy Elliott, Cainon "Lambo" Lamb
- Additional keyboards – Anthony "J.R. Smashh" Randolph
- Engineering – Miguel "Pro" Castro
- Mixing – Manny Marroquin
- Mixing assistance – Erik Madrid, Chris Galland

== Charts ==
=== Weekly charts ===
Weekly chart performance for "Until It's Gone"
Chart (2012)	Peak position
US Adult R&B Songs (Billboard)	11
US Hot R&B/Hip-Hop Songs (Billboard)	22

=== Year-end charts ===
Year-end chart performance for "Until It's Gone"
Chart (2012)	Position
US Adult R&B Songs (Billboard)	27
US Hot R&B/Hip-Hop Songs (Billboard)	89

== Release history ==
Release dates and formats for "Until It's Gone"
Country	Date	Format	Label	Ref.
Germany	September 26, 2011	Digital single	Sony Music	
United States	September 27, 2011	Digital single	RCA	
United States	October 3, 2011	Urban mainstream radio	RCA	
United States	October 4, 2011	Urban adult radio	RCA	
