= The Way I Like It =

Single by Mandy Capristo

from the album Grace
- Released: April 13, 2012
- Label: Starwatch; EMI
- Songwriters: David Jost; Twin
- Producers: Jost; Twin

Mandy singles chronology
"The Way I Like It" (2012)	"Closer" (2012)

Music video
- "The Way I Like It" on YouTube

"The Way I Like It" is a song by German singer Mandy Capristo. Written and produced by David Jost and Swedish production team Twin, it was recorded by Capristo for her debut solo album Grace (2012). Released as the album's lead single, it marked her first release as a solo artist following the disbandment of her band Monrose. Upon release, the electropop song reached number eleven on the German Singles Chart, while reaching the top thirty in Austria and Switzerland. It also served as theme song to the film adaption of the German comedy series Türkisch für Anfänger (2012).

== Background ==
"The Way I Like It" was written and produced by German musician David Jost and Swedish production team Twin. Capristo teased a snippet of the single version of "The Way I Like It" on 1 March 2012. On 14 March, the audience of Let's Dance was previewed a new section of the song. On 15 March, an acoustic version of "The Way I Like It" was presented live. Capristo commented on the song: "There have been so many songs that were attributed to me that we wrote together, or that I have written but when I heard "The Way I Like It", I thought, 'This is it!' That's easy for me the most beautiful music."

== Music video ==
A music video for "The Way I Like It" was directed by Lennart Brede and premiered on the MyVideo on 5 April 2012. Three different settings were chosen. At the beginning, Capristo walks through the gates of a huge castle in a pink Haute couture dress. Capristo said: "We wanted to get a contrast to an haute couture gown and went to an old ruin and shoot there. It was definitely very cold." Finally she goes dancing inside the walls of the building. This is interwoven with dream-like flashbacks shot in black and white where she lies in the arms of an unknown man. Finally, it starts to rain through the roof of the old building so that it is completely wet. "I had to shoot a rain scene at 3:30 in the morning. The water it was not heated." Some shots show a black outfit on a ledge of the castle. The video ends with a scene where the unknown man carries Capristo from a room.

== Track listings ==
Maxi single
No.	Title	Writer(s)	Producer(s)	Length
1.	"The Way I Like It" (single version)	David Jost; Twin	Jost; Twin	3:14
2.	"The Way I Like It" (acoustic version)	Jost; Twin	Jost; Twin	3:27
3.	"One Moment in Time"	Albert Hammond; John Bettis		4:38

== Charts ==
Chart performance for "The Way I Like It"
Chart (2012)	Peak position
Austria (Ö3 Austria Top 40)	30
Germany (GfK)	11
Switzerland (Schweizer Hitparade)	29

== Certifications ==
Certifications for "The Way I Like It"
Region	Certification	Certified units/sales
Germany (BVMI)	Gold	150,000^{^}
^{^} Shipments figures based on certification alone.

== Release history ==
Release history for "The Way I Like It"
Region	Date	Format
Various	April 13, 2012	CD single; digital download
