= Ching-a-Ling =

2008 single by Missy Elliott

Single by Missy Elliott

from the album Step Up 2 the Streets
- Released: January 22, 2008
- Length: 3:43
- Label: Goldmind; Atlantic
- Songwriters: Shawn Campbell; Missy Elliott; Cainon Lamb; Marshall Leathers
- Producers: The Arkitects; Lamb

Missy Elliott singles chronology
"Let It Go" (2007)	"Ching-a-Ling" (2008)	"Shake Your Pom Pom" (2008)

Music video
- "Ching-a-Ling" on YouTube

"Ching-a-Ling" is a song by American rapper Missy Elliott. It was written by Elliott along with frequent collaborator Cainon Lamb as well as Shawn Campbell and Marshall Leathers from production duo The Arkitects for what was supposed to be Elliott's seventh studio album Block Party, while production was helmed by Lamb, Campbell, and Leathers. In the song, sound elements of the 1981 arcade game Donkey Kong are heard throughout the song.

Serving as the lead single for the soundtrack of the dance drama film Step Up 2 the Streets (2008), the song premiered on both Elliott's MySpace and official website on January 10, 2008 before being released digitally by The Goldmind Inc. and Atlantic Records on January 22, 2008. Within a week, it had debuted on the US Billboard Hot R&B/Hip-Hop Songs chart. Released to positive reviews, "Ching-a-Ling" was ranked 69th on Rolling Stone's list of the 100 Best Songs of 2008.

== Critical reception ==
Blues & Soul found that "the tune packs a powerful punch and is instantly catchy. It just sounds like one that will burn very brightly for a short while and then be forgotten. It's a club-friendly bubbler that would sit nicely alongside the likes of Eve's "Tambourine," with several winning elements in place – a nonsensical infectious hook, bass-heavy buzzing beat, and a feisty vocal edge." In a retrospective review of the song, Steven J. Horowitz from Vulture remarked: "There was something repetitive about "Ching-a-Ling" that closely followed the blueprints Elliott had set before it: the reversed vocal lines, the whistles, the incessantly chanted chorus. It felt almost too familiar, and yet, still welcome as one of the liveliest of her post-Cookbook cuts." Rolling Stone ranked the song 69th on its 100 Best Songs of 2008 listing.

== Music video ==
Elliott reteamed with director Dave Meyers to film a music video for "Ching-a-Ling", which features portions from her other Step Up 2 the Streets single "Shake Your Pom Pom" (2008). Filmed in 3D, the video guest-stars the famous Japanese hip hop dance group, U-Min, known for their slow motion dancing and popping. Shot in Los Angeles, California in January 2008, stylist Misa Hylton worked on the set. The video premiered on MTV's TRL and BET's 106 & Park on February 4, 2008.

The "Ching-a-Ling" portion of the music video is set primarily with a white backdrop featuring Elliott and various background dancers, such as U-Min. Other shots are interspersed throughout the video which relates to the lyrics, such as Elliott swinging on a rope swing in an Autumn setting, and playing a DDR-esque game which uses the letters of Ching-A-Ling instead of arrows. The "Shake Your Pom Pom" portion of the music video is set in what appears to be a house party, with Elliott and others dancing before ending with Elliott and others blowing noisemakers at the camera.

== Remixes ==
The official remix of "Ching-a-Ling" features rappers Busta Rhymes and singer Ciara. Other additional remixes featuring Kid Capri, Precious Latoye and Buckshot were released via mixtapes and radio airplay.

== Charts ==
=== Weekly charts ===
Weekly chart performance for "Ching-a-Ling"
Chart (2008)	Peak position
Canada Hot 100 (Billboard)	58
Germany (GfK)	85
Netherlands (Single Top 100)	97
New Zealand (Recorded Music NZ)	24
UK Singles (OCC)	180
US Billboard Hot 100	60
US Dance Singles Sales (Billboard) with "Shake Your Pom Pom"	9
US Hot R&B/Hip-Hop Songs (Billboard)	28
US Pop 100 (Billboard)	57
US Hot Rap Songs (Billboard)	11
US Rhythmic Airplay (Billboard)	33

=== Year-end charts ===
Year-end chart performance for "Ching-a-Ling"
Chart (2008)	Position
US Hot R&B/Hip-Hop Songs (Billboard)	99

== Release history ==
Release history for "Ching-a-Ling"
Region	Date	Format(s)	Label	Ref(s)
Various	January 22, 2008	Digital download	Goldmind; Atlantic	
