= Closer (Mandy Capristo song) =

Single by Mandy Capristo

from the album Grace
- Released: August 31, 2012
- Length: 4:02
- Label: Starwatch; EMI
- Songwriter(s): Robin Grubert; Martin Tingvall
- Producer(s): Peter Keller

Mandy singles chronology
"The Way I Like It" (2012)	"Closer" (2012)	"One Woman Army" (2016)

"Closer" is song by German singer Mandy Capristo. It was written by Robin Grubert and Martin Tingvall for her debut solo album Grace (2012), while production was helmed by Peter Keller. The song was released by Starwatch Entertainment as the album's second and final single in August 2012 and peaked at number 62 on the German Singles Chart and number 73 on the Austrian Singles Chart.

== Background ==
Capristo first presented "Closer" live on 20 July 2012. The song was issued to radios as the album's second single on 9 August. Capristo said of "Closer": "The song is intended to provide simple, that you are more happy about things that you have to remembers it and not taking anything for granted accepts. I also had the point in my life where all my material needs were met and I was not happy. As it did click and I reconsidered what is really important to me."

== Music video ==
A music video for "Closer" was directed by Oliver Sommer and filmed on 9 June 2012. A total of four different scenes were filmed. At the beginning of the video takes place in a new apartment, Capristo and her boyfriend (played by Thando Walbaum) set them up straight. The second scene begins in a bar Capristo is again with her boyfriend and wearing a long cocktail dress. Then tilts the mood as her boyfriend flirting with another woman appears, and then leaves the room. He returns with Capristo ran furiously out of the bar a car racing towards them. Your friend saves her by jumping in front of them. Then he is taken to hospital and is in a coma. Capristo visits him every day and leaves him on little sticky notes love messages. The last setting is ended with the resounding beats of the victim. It remains unclear whether this will wake up. Capristos fans could determine the end of the video. Either her lover remains in a coma, or he wakes up again. The video was premiered on MyVideo on 2 August 2012.

== Track listings ==
Maxi single
No.	Title	Writer(s)	Producer(s)	Length
1.	"Closer" (radio edit)	Robin Grubert; Martin Tingvall	Peter Keller	3:37
2.	"Closer" (acoustic version)	Grubert; Tingvall	Keller	4:30
3.	"Hurricane" (acoustic version)	David Eriksen; Ina Wroldsen	Eriksen	3:48
4.	"Overrated" (acoustic version)	Will Simms; Debbie French; Derek McDonals	Simms	3:55
5.	"Be You"	George Hammond-Hagan; Michelle Escoffery; Scott Wild	White N3rd	4:12
6.	"Closer" (music video)			4:12

== Charts ==
Weekly chart performance for "Closer"
Chart (2012)	Peak position
Austria (Ö3 Austria Top 40)	73
Germany (GfK)	64

== Release history ==
Release history and formats for "Closer"
Region	Date	Format
Various	August 31, 2012	CD single; digital download
