= Countdown (Beyoncé song) =

2011 single by Beyoncé

Single by Beyoncé

from the album 4
- Released: October 4, 2011
- Recorded: 2010
- Studio: MSR (New York City)
- Genre: R&B; funk; reggae; dancehall
- Length: 3:32
- Label: Columbia
- Songwriters: Beyoncé Knowles; Terius "The-Dream" Nash; Shea Taylor; Ester Dean; Cainon Lamb; Julie Frost; Nathan Morris; Wanya Morris; Michael Bivins
- Producers: Beyoncé Knowles; Shea Taylor; Cainon Lamb

Beyoncé singles chronology
"Love On Top" (2011)	"Countdown" (2011)	"I Care" (2012)

Music video
- "Countdown" on YouTube

"Countdown" is a song recorded by American singer Beyoncé Knowles for her fourth studio album, 4 (2011). The song was written by Knowles, Terius Nash, Shea Taylor, Ester Dean, Cainon Lamb, Julie Frost, Michael Bivins, Nathan Morris and Wanya Morris, and produced by Beyoncé, Taylor and Lamb. The song's conception was brought about by Knowles desiring to mix musical styles of the 1990s with the 1970s. It was sent to radio on October 4, 2011, as the fifth single from 4.

Featuring a sample of "Uhh Ahh" by Boyz II Men, "Countdown" incorporates aspects of hip hop, funk, reggae and world music. Lyrically, the female protagonist delivers a message of monogamy to her lover, celebrating self-worthiness as well as appreciating him. Several music critics were surprised by its maturity and compared it to Beyoncé's earlier solo work and with Destiny's Child. The song finished second in 2011's Pazz & Jop critics' poll and was included on the list of the year's best songs by various critics and publications including Spin, Rolling Stone and The Guardian. "Countdown" peaked at number 71 on the US Billboard Hot 100 chart. It also peaked at number 12 on the US Hot R&B/Hip-Hop Songs chart, and number one on the US Hot Dance Club Songs chart. It has been certified gold by the Recording Industry Association of America (RIAA). "Countdown" peaked at number 35 on the UK Singles Chart and number nine on the UK R&B Chart.

Adria Petty directed the accompanying music video, which was recorded while Knowles was pregnant in August 2011. The music video sees Beyoncé incorporate a mix of classic and modern dances, with references to pieces like that of Audrey Hepburn's appearance in Funny Face. Although well received by critics, the video faced controversy for the use of choreography from Anne Teresa De Keersmaeker's 1983 ballet Rosas danst Rosas. Beyoncé performed "Countdown" on her 4 Intimate Nights with Beyoncé and Revel Presents: Beyoncé Live residency shows, as a video interlude on The Mrs. Carter Show World Tour and on the set list of The Formation World Tour.

== Background and release ==
"Countdown" was written by Beyoncé, Terius Nash, Shea Taylor, Ester Dean, Cainon Lamb, Julie Frost, Michael Bivins, Nathan Morris and Wanya Morris. Production was handled by Beyoncé, Taylor and Lamb. Bivins, Morris and Morris are credited as "Countdown" samples Boyz II Men's 1991 single, "Uhh Ahh". A private listening party for Knowles' fourth studio album was held on May 12, 2011, at the Sony offices in New York City, where one of the five songs previewed was "Countdown". While playing the song, Knowles commented: "[Jay-Z] liked it. I do not think he was dissecting it, just thinking of what he could do to it as a rapper."

On June 7, 2011, both "Party" and "Countdown" leaked online, followed by the whole album, three weeks prior to its official release date on June 28, 2011. This was followed by cease-and-desist notices from Beyoncé's legal team, who forced multiple media sites to remove download links to the songs. Beginning on June 16 to June 27, 2011, the songs from 4 were available to listen to in full each day on Knowles' official website, paired with its accompanying photo spread from the album packaging and a quote. On June 24, 2011, "Countdown" was the ninth song to be chosen. The quote found Beyoncé elaborating on the song's inspiration: "I really liked mixing the 90s with the 70s. I put those two together and it was so much fun putting bridges back into songs, all the things in music that I love that I feel I just want to hear again." She also referred to "Countdown" as "really experimental". Concerning the development "Countdown" and the reason for using the sample, Beyoncé stated:

I wanted to do something refreshing and different, so I mixed genres and drew inspiration from touring, traveling, watching rock bands, and attending festivals… I was like a mad scientist, putting lots of different songs together. Boyz II Men were the first ones to put Destiny's Child on tour. They showed us how to treat an opening act and I will never forget that. That was 15 years ago! Wow, 15 years! I'm old.

On September 22, 2011, Columbia Records posted the cover art of "Countdown" on the official website of KZII-FM, most commonly known as "102.5 Kiss FM". It was the same photograph spread for "Countdown" in the album notes for 4 and it was taken by German photographer Ellen von Unwerth. "Countdown" impacted both rhythmic and contemporary hit radio on October 4, 2011, in the United States as the fourth single from 4.

== Development ==
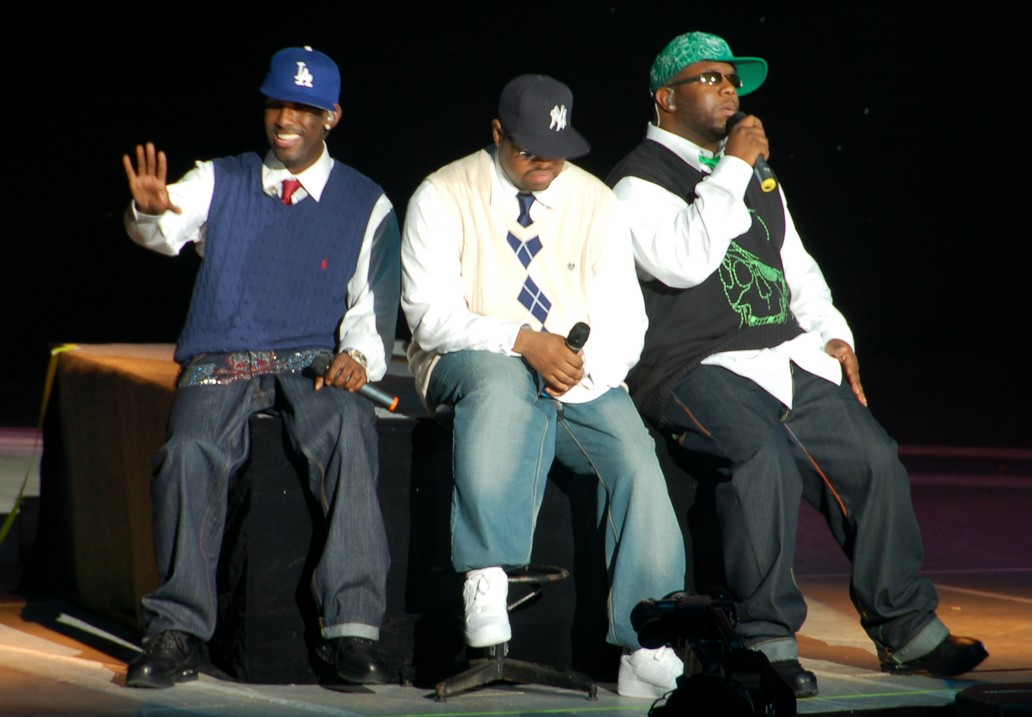
"Countdown" samples "Uhh Ahh" by Boyz II Men who included Destiny's Child on tour as an opening act.

In an interview with Leslie Moore on Tumblr, Cainon Lamb recalled how he started working on the Boyz II Men's sample and how his work reached Knowles. He said that he began working on "Countdown" during the night preceding the 2010 BET Awards. He was in the studio, listening to Boyz II Men's song, "Uhh Ahh". He commented: "[It] starts with a countdown of '10, 9, 8, 7, 6, 5, 4, 3, 2, 1'. So I thought, 'Wow, that could be something. Just the countdown itself.'" Once the countdown was in the computer, he slightly increased the pace at which it was played, added some snare drum taps to it, and started a beat. After that, he sent the song to his publisher, EMI Music. The latter was impressed with the instrumental and went on saying: "I had a meeting this morning with Beyoncé and I played a couple other songs I had and she wasn't really feeling them. When I played the beat that you sent me, you should have seen how she went crazy! She started dancing and bouncing up and down and just doing all kind of stuff. She loved that beat!" On the request of his publisher, Lamb made "a female version of the countdown part". Terius Nash wrote the verses and two days later, Knowles went in the studio and recorded it.

In an interview with Jocelyn Vena of MTV News, the members of Boyz II Men said that they were surprised that Beyoncé decided to use their song on "Countdown" even though they have known her for long. Wanya Morris considered it a "clever" move and quipped that Boyz II Men finally got their duet with Beyoncé.

== Composition ==
=== Music and comparisons ===
"Countdown", which samples "Uhh Ahh" performed by American group Boyz II Men, was considered to be "everywhere on the genre map" by Consequence of Sound's Chris Coplan. It is an upbeat R&B song, displaying elements of funk, hip hop, Latin pop, world music, reggae as well as dancehall influences. "Countdown" is set in common time with a moderate tempo of 84 beats per minute. The song is scored in the key of D minor, and has the sequence Dm–Gm–F–C. Beyoncé's voice in the song ranges from D_{3} to F_{5}. "Countdown" makes heavy use of staccato horns, and rides a "disjointed military rhythm", containing an "agitated" Afrobeat heavy brass riff which, according to Alexis Petridis of The Guardian, bears resemblance to that of "Run the World (Girls)" (2011). Jody Rosen of Rolling Stone attributed the bristling brass arrangement to the fact that Beyoncé's collaborated with the band from Fela! for a couple of days to gain inspiration from the play's subject, Nigerian multi-instrumentalist musician and composer, Fela Kuti. Additional instrumentation on the song includes a keyboard, synthesizers, a plucky guitar, 180 BPM steel drums, and trumpets. Built on a stepping beat, "Countdown" features video-game bleeps reminiscent of Knowles' previous alter ego, Sasha Fierce, as stated by Jocelyn Vena of MTV News. Priya Elan of NME noted that it also consists of "some nicely disorientating" chord changes.

"Countdown"
A 21-second sample of part of the hook lines of "Countdown". As the countdown of "Uhh Ahh" plays, Knowles interpolates additional lyrics.

Ryan Dombal of Pitchfork viewed "Countdown" as a sequel to Beyoncé's own 2003 single, "Crazy in Love". Matthew Horton of BBC compared the musical style of "Countdown" to that of M.I.A.'s work. John Mitchell of MTV Newsroom wrote that "'[Countdown]' has a flair that reminds us of ... the best tracks from B'Day." Similarly, Matthew Perpetua of Rolling Stone wrote that "Countdown" is a "playful [and] inventive jam", in tradition of "Get Me Bodied" (2007), adding the former "revisits the "sassy spirit" of the latter. Jocelyn Vena added that while "Countdown" is different from other songs on 4, it has a "Check on It" vibe. Joey Guerra of the Houston Chronicle commented that the song shares the same "frenetic club swagger" as previous Destiny's Child singles such as "Bug a Boo" (1999) and "Jumpin', Jumpin'" (2000).

=== Song structure and lyrical interpretation ===
Throughout the song, Beyoncé sings with "a sassy attitude", setting a "futuristic tone", as stated by Jocelyn Vena. According to Dombal, "Countdown" finds Knowles as the female protagonist delivering her "message of ten years of loyalty" to her love interest. Jody Rosen of Rolling Stone, who described "Countdown" as a "monogamous romance", added that it is a love song that is "no less sexy for being unblinkingly true to life", and Jocelyn Vena of MTV News wrote that the song is "all about the rapture of true love". Kicking off with Knowles vocal runs followed by a reggae-ish beat, horns and drums, Knowles starts to chant the introductory lines, which also serves as the pre-chorus lines, "Oh, killing me softly and I'm still falling / Still the one I need, I will always be with you / Oh, you got me all gone, don't ever let me go / Say it real loud if you fly / If you leave me you're out of your mind", followed by the chorus lines, which is a literal count backwards where Knowles counts down the ways in which she loves her man, "My baby is a ten / We dressing to the nine / He pick me up at eight / Make me feel so lucky seven / He kiss me in his six / We be making love in five / Still the one I do this four / I’m trying to make a three / From that two / He still the one."

According to Maura Johnston of The Village Voice, the verses of "Countdown" contain lyrics about "twinned boasts of self-worth and proclamations of fidelity into a tight knot of romantic ideals". In the first verse of the song, Knowles' chants lines dedicated to the one she loves, "There's ups and downs in this love / Got a lot to learn in this love / Through the good and the bad, still got love". The verse continues with Knowles offering her partner copious praise, in a half-rap cadence, "Still love the way he talks / Still love the way I sing / Still love the way he rock them black diamonds in that chain." As stated by Adam Markovitz of Entertainment Weekly, the first verse of "Countdown" also contains "joy-inducing non-lyrics" such as "Me and my boo, and my boo, boo-ridin’. Additionally, Knowles sings to her love interest that he should feel lucky "to have her grind up on him." In the second verse, Knowles continues to boast of all the ways her man is lucky to have her, happily declaring her devotion to him, and celebrates their "mature relationship", as stated by Spence D. of IGN. Towards the end of the verse, Knowles references the Houston Rockets in the lyrics.

== Critical reception ==
=== Reviews ===
"Countdown" was widely acclaimed by music critics. Adam Markovitz of Entertainment Weekly wrote that "[...] unsurprisingly, Beyoncé is at her best when she sounds like no one but herself." She also commended Knowles for "tak[ing] her trusty freakum dress out of mothballs" for "Countdown". Taking into account the track placement of the song on 4, Thomas Conner of the Chicago Sun-Times complimented "Countdown" for picking things up and making 4 start moving near the end, describing the song as "careening into an ethnic club". John Mitchell of MTV News called "Countdown" the best track from 4, writing that it is impossible to resist, while Jocelyn Vena of the same publication named "Countdown" the most surprising song on the album. Conrad Tao of Sputnikmusic found that "Countdown" was one of the irresistible uptempo cuts on 4 and added that it makes "particularly successful use of its namesake" as well as its dancehall influences.

Eric Henderson of Slant Magazine described the song as a "hyperventilating number" which sounds like a "parody of Beyoncé's more militant hits from the tail-end of the Destiny's Child era" further favoring the song's sample of Boyz II Men's "Uhh Ahh". Ben Cardew of Music Week appreciated "Countdown"'s composition and praised Knowles for experimenting with it; he thought "Countdown" was the oddest thing on the album and in Knowles' entire career. He coined the song as "a new page in [Knowles'] book". Similarly, Rich Juzwiak of The Village Voice wrote that the sample of "Uhh Ahh" provides "one in the tangled collection of hooks that is the whirlwind career highlight [of Knowles] on 'Countdown'". Erika Ramirez of Billboard magazine commented that "Countdown" has the potential to manifest "trillions of YouTube dance crazes". Chris Coplan of Consequence of Sound commented that "[...] as far as demonstrating the power of a stripped-down Beyoncé and how devastating that can be, the winner is 'Countdown'." He praised the chorus which he described as being created "of staggering simplicity and effectiveness".

Alexis Petridis of The Guardian stated that "there's nothing like ['Countdown'] on the charts" and that the brass arrangement "stab the one moment you hear anything resembling the influences mooted in the advance publicity". Ryan Dombal of Pitchfork wrote that the album's best elements, thematically and sonically, burst ahead on "Countdown", which he described as a sequel to "Crazy in Love". James Reed of The Boston Globe viewed "Countdown" as a radio-friendly song, having the potential of being one of the biggest hits from 4. Echoing Reed's sentiments, Joanne Dorken of MTV UK wrote that "Countdown" is "faced-past, original and bound to be a massive tune in clubs across the globe". Dorke also noted it to be "a refreshing break from the slower part of the [4]". Michael Cragg of The Observer commended the way 4 peaks with the "incredible 'Countdown' [featuring] Beyoncé near rapping over ecstatic horn blasts".

=== Recognition ===
On The Village Voice's Pazz & Jop critics' year-end list in 2011, "Countdown" was ranked at number two. Maura Johnston of the same publication included "Countdown" on her list of 47 Great Songs From 2011. Charles Aaron of Spin magazine placed "Countdown" at number two on his list of the 20 Best Songs of 2011, writing: "'Countdown' is Beyoncé's gangsta throwdown as an artiste, bumping and grinding and skipping and skating and caressing and catcalling and bearing witness all over the beat like nobody since MJ [Michael Jackson] — full stop. The Afro brass blasts, the minimalist synth boop boop, the jazzy Boyz II Men breakdown, the syncopated shiftiness back-to-front. A masterpiece, with legs for days." Rolling Stone ranked the song at number eight on its list of the 50 Best Singles of 2011, writing that it is a triumphal love song, "slathered in crazy sauce; marching-band drums, backward-counting backup singers, honking horns", and praising its hook. Additionally, Rob Sheffield ranked the song at number 3 on his list of The Top 25 Songs of 2011 writing, "The harder she tries to come on crazy, the less crazy she sounds. She might be the most aggressively sane pop diva ever, even when she's boofing her boof boof." Consequence of Sound's staff placed "Countdown" at number four on their list of the Top 50 Songs of 2011 and wrote, "Beyoncé has transcended the traditional confines of pop diva status ... Queen B has built an empire of love songs and tributes to her boo(s), but none, be it on this album or the three before, come off as easily and thoroughly as they do here. We dare anyone to resist falling under the spell of the chorus, ... the sing-along-ability, the bombastic nature, and the beat... Count it any way you want, this number’s a shining gem in Beyoncé's bangin[g] catalog."

The Guardian's critics Michael Cragg, Caspar Llewellyn Smith and Sian Rowe placed "Countdown" at numbers one, four and five on their lists of The 10 Best Tracks of 2011. The song was also ranked on The Guardian's writers' year-end list of Top 40 Best Songs of 2011 at number seven. Glenn Gamboa of Newsday placed the song at number 9 on his list of the best songs of 2011, writing, "While her ambitious '4' album was uneven, this love song, packed with stacked vocals, marching band horns and crazed synths, is irreplaceable." It was also ranked at number 12 on Billboard's list of 20 Best Songs of 2011 and number 30 on The Sydney Morning Herald's list of the Top 50 Singles of 2011. Aaron Zorgel of Aux ranked the song on their list of Top 15 Pop Releases: 2011 calling it the best song on 4. NPR's staff writers placed it on their list of 100 Favorite Songs Of 2011 writing that it was "An ode to married bliss that's also an exploding grab bag of sounds, from the Boyz II Men sample to a marching band." The staff members of Pitchfork placed it at number seven on their list of The Top 100 Tracks of 2011. The Jack Beats Remix of the song was included in Spin's list of favorite dance tracks of 2011 at number seven. In 2013, John Boone and Jennifer Cady of E! Online placed the song at number two on their list of ten best Knowles' songs. In 2019, Pitchfork listed Countdown at number 28 on their greatest songs of the decade (2010s) list.

== Chart performance ==
Selling 14,897 digital downloads, "Countdown" opened at number 40 on the South Korea Gaon International Singles Chart for the week ending July 2, 2011, following the release of 4. Before being released a single in the United States, it debuted at number 75 on the US Hot R&B/Hip-Hop Songs chart issue dated July 2, 2011. The song also charted at number 12 on the US Bubbling Under Hot 100 Singles chart issue dated July 16, 2011. For the week ending October 29, 2011, "Countdown" was the Hot Shot Debut on the US Hot Dance Club Songs chart. It also debuted at number 85 on the US Billboard Hot 100 chart. The following week, it moved to number 71. For the week ending November 19, 2011, the song debuted at number 38 on the US Pop Songs chart. "Countdown" reached number one on the Hot Dance Club Songs chart for the week ending December 24, 2011, becoming Knowles' 17th song to top that chart. It has been certified double platinum by the Recording Industry Association of America (RIAA) for sales and streams of over 2,000,000 units.

Though not officially released in the United Kingdom, "Countdown" debuted at number 171 on the UK Singles Chart on October 9, 2011, and moved to number 77 the following week. It climbed from number 47 to number 22 on the UK R&B Chart on October 16, 2011. The song moved to number 49 on the UK Singles Chart and to number 13 on the UK R&B chart the following week. On November 6, 2011, "Countdown" peaked at number 35 on the UK Singles Chart and at number nine on the UK R&B Chart.

== Music video ==
=== Background and development ===
On August 2, 2011, Complex magazine reported that the music video for "Countdown" was in preparations for filming, and that it was being directed by Adria Petty, who previously directed the music video for "Sweet Dreams" (2009). Knowles also co-directed. A 38-second preview of the video was posted on MTV.com on October 3, 2011. The full video premiered on October 6, 2011, at 7:56 p.m. ET on MTV and Knowles' official website. An alternate version of the music video was released on the Live at Roseland: Elements of 4 DVD.

Concerning her collaboration with Knowles, Petty stated: "I think whenever you work with Beyoncé it's a collaboration. She has a lot of input. And then you have the time constraints that come with working with her that push you into different directions. [...] There are countless homages to pop culture of the past in this video. I think we were playing with Mod, and '60's and '80's iconic stuff that [Beyoncé] responded to and related to." She further said that during the filming Knowles put a lot of energy and made many decisions for the finished product. Talking about the development and the filming of the video, Petty said:

I brought Beyoncé a number of references and we picked some out together. Most were German modern-dance references, believe it or not. But it really evolved. The references were then dispersed to her creative team (hair, makeup, wardrobe), and they interpreted them on the set in their own special way. Of course, one of the strongest wardrobe references was Audrey Hepburn in Funny Face when she does the beatnik dance scene. I think a lot grew from there. [...] The shoot was great. We had a number of brilliant dancers and musicians and a top-notch crew. Beyoncé brings in a number of her own people who are so hardworking. Our video was the fourth they had shot in five days. I love the creative team that works with Beyoncé because they can roll with anything and keep smiling. Everyone was really upbeat and excited because we all love the track and the opportunity to work with Beyoncé so much.

In 5 days, Knowles filmed various music videos from the album back-to-back. "Countdown" was the fourth one filmed. It was shot in New York City warehouses. Petty noted that the video unexpectedly celebrated Knowles' pregnancy as there are scenes in which Knowles' baby bump are visible and not. She added that these circumstances meant that the video was developed under "evolving circumstances that remained flexible". According to John Mitchell of MTV News: "[The clip is] a perfect mix of classic and modern, which seems to be what Beyoncé is aiming for in this era of her career. It is a feeling reflected in the smooth, '[19]90s vibe and reliance on live instruments that sets her album 4 apart from her previous work as well as other artists on the charts right now."

=== Fashion ===
Knowles' fashion in the clip includes retro side-swept mini bangs, large lined eyes and almond-shaped pumpkin-colored nails. As stated by MTV Style, these accessories, alongside Knowles' "syncopated dancing in vibrant monochrome, wink back to that iconic Audrey Hepburn sequence in Funny Face". Knowles' make-up was by Francesca Tolot, who explained, "The inspiration behind Beyoncé'[s] brightly-lined lids came from the beatnik movement of the late '[19]50s, early '[19]60s. From previous experiences with Dreamgirls, I knew Beyoncé looked amazing with that type of makeup so the almond eye seemed to be the perfect fit." For the countdown part of the video, Knowles wears black and white from head-to-toe and neon orange nails. The first time Knowles shows her baby bump in the video, she wears a black and white dress, designed by Thierry Mugler.

Next, Knowles wears a primary color leotard Capezio collection with a black and white striped Karen Keith for Patricia Field sun hat. During the second chorus, Knowles wears a sheer American Apparel oversized button up with high stiletto heels. She later wears more colorways of the sheer American Apparel button-up with a tied headkerchief, changing the shoes for loafers, and a pastel palette. In a scene reminiscent of the film Flashdance, Knowles wears an off-the-shoulder Forever 21 T-shirt, showing a lilac bra strap and blunt bangs. For the Dreamgirls flashback, she wears a jeweled Chan Luu mini dress, subtle makeup with sculpted brows and a shiny, flipped bob. For the final scene, Knowles wears another black and white striped American Apparel outfit with a sleek tank, shorts, suspenders and white socks with pumps.

=== Synopsis and analysis ===
John Mitchell of MTV News wrote that, throughout the clip, Knowles is "all smiles, perhaps reflecting her joy at beginning a new phase in her life". The visibility of Knowles' pregnancy varies throughout the video, indicating she may have filmed some of the footage for "Countdown" earlier in her pregnancy and later re-shot or re-conceptualized the clip to reflect her growing belly. The clip has several references and looks, dating from the 1960s to the 1980s. Knowles re-enacts a series of iconic pop images in the video.

The video opens with a close shot of Knowles' face who's wearing a similar make-up to English model Twiggy. The video then shows shots of Knowles moving her arms like a clock and wearing a black T-shirt and black trousers. Scenes similar to 1957 film Funny Face follow with Knowles looking like Audrey Hepburn. Those shots are cut by a variety of brightly colored bathing suits and a black-and-white hat, set against a constantly changing background of colors which is similar to Vogue photo shoots. Knowles' baby bump is less visible in the bathing suit scenes but is featured prominently earlier in the video. The clip cuts quickly from the bathing suit sequence to shots of Knowles in an audition space similar to the 1980 film Fame. The sequence features choreographed moves from Knowles and her back-up dancers who snap with their fingers which is a reference to 1961 musical West Side Story.

Knowles lovingly rubs her baby bump in a scene that features 10 different incarnations of herself in a loft space. According to MTV Newsroom, this is the "key scene" where Knowles puts into perspective all those aforementioned sides. Knowles references Brigitte Bardot when the video cuts to and from shots of Knowles in a men's dress shirt with her hair styled up with a scarf. She also briefly references her film, Dreamgirls, more specifically the latter's inspiration, being Diana Ross, during a few brief scenes in which Knowles wears a short, sparkly dress and bob hairstyle. The clip then sequences from Fame to Flashdance with Knowles and her dancers in another open warehouse-like space sporting the iconic off-the-shoulder look from the 1983 drama starring Jennifer Beals. The video ends with Knowles in a chair, dancing and then flashing a smile.

=== Reception ===
John Mitchell of MTV News praised Knowles' dance skills and sexiness in the video despite being pregnant, and called it "a feast for the eyes" and "a perfect mix of classic and modern, which seems to be what Beyoncé is aiming for in this era of her career". A writer of The Huffington Post described the video as "characteristically kinetic". Chris Coplan of Consequence of Sound wrote that "the concept may be simple, but the intricate dance numbers (take that, Fred Astaire!) and split screen action make for an energetic cinematic affair with loads of modern swag and '60s-inspired sass." Joe Marvilli of the same publication wrote that the retro horns in the song, match the 1960s "throwback visuals" as Knowles "sashes through a variety of classy outfits and energetic dance moves. It's as full of sass and swagger, as if she'd give us any less". Entertainment Weekly's Grady Smith compared Knowles with Nicki Minaj and called the video a "typical Beyoncé dance-fest featuring frenetic movement, flashing colors, and a whole lot of sexy outfits". Contessa Gayles of The Boombox also compared Knowles' look and make-up in the video with Minaj's style. Lisa Potter of Marie Claire compared Knowles with Andy Warhol. Carrie Battan of Pitchfork called it a "clean and classic, filled with blocked colors, Audrey Hepburn stylings and the occasional flashing of the baby bump". Luke Jennings of The Guardian called the video a "slick, very new-retro piece of film-making, and borrowed imagery is absolutely the point of it". Stereogum wrote that the video "has [a] potential to be the most electric Beyoncé video since the immortal classic 'Single Ladies (Put a Ring on It)'". Similarly, Matt Donnelly of the Los Angeles Times described the video as "so fantastic it borders on annoying" and added that it could be a miniature version of "Single Ladies". AOL Music's Marina Galperina called the video "mod-tastic" and the editing "funky" and "collaged".

Leah Collins of Dose magazine wrote that the director "has taken everything to concoct a technicolour rainbow of retro throw-back set-pieces". Colleen Nika of Rolling Stone commented, "Already one of the year's most acclaimed pop singles, [the video] will also go down as one of the year's most stylish clips, though it didn't pull any slick maneuvers to earn that distinction", and described it as "brilliant and bright". Nika also said that the video contrasted with Lady Gaga's style and that it was another "pop art effect" for Knowles. Matthew Perpetua of the same publication wrote that the video had a "variety of dazzling looks that could definitely be emulated by fans on the cheap". He stated, "the clip is nearly as joyful and super-charged as the song itself, with its barrage of world-class hooks complemented by a rapid succession of memorable, charming and sexy images." Ray Rahman of New York magazine wrote that Knowles "packs the short video with all her classic signatures: being amazing at dancing, recruiting teams of others to be amazing at dancing, and proving how even her fingers are amazing at dancing. But also, and possibly most importantly: Babyoncé!" Kathleen Perricone of Daily News wrote that "Beyoncé's baby isn't even born yet – and already it's a star" referring to her abdomen in the video. Erika Ramiirez of Billboard commented that "even with a bun in the oven, Beyoncé can still bring it." CNN wrote that "the imagery is a hodge-podge of modern and retro styling created in an ultra-bright palette, and staccato camera work effortlessly matches 'Countdown's' beat." Sasha Frere-Jones of The New Yorker wrote, "And though Beyoncé's video for 'Countdown' is close to the top of pack simply on the strength of extreme shoulder work, the video art form is going through a phase of robust, competitive health, probably because the money's gone."

=== Recognition and accolades ===
According to MTV News, the video was well received by fans, who praised its simplicity and Knowles' "bumpin[g] belly". For the week ending October 29, 2011, the music video for "Countdown" debuted at number one on Yahoo! Video chart. The writers of Stereogum ranked it at number one on their year-end list of the best music videos of 2011. The video was placed on Pitchfork's unranked list of The Top Music Videos of 2011, and at number four on the list of Consequence of Sound's staff, who wrote: "The flawless makeup and choreography coupled (yes, that was intentional) with calculatedly goofy facial expressions and dancing maintain the tenuous balance between idol Sasha Fierce and Bey[oncé], the girl next door. It proves to her audience that even though Beyoncé is rapidly ascending the celebrity ladder to an almost untouchable height, she's just like any other girl who secretly wants to be Audrey Hepburn in Funny Face." The writers of Slant Magazine put the music video at number 17 on their list of The 25 Best Music Videos of 2011, writing that "using jolts of pop-art colors, virtuosic editing, and a smile that spans from one tip of her bob cut to the other, Beyoncé pilfers through a very specific musical past with her customarily giddy and sincere sense of spirit." Jesse Skinner of Toro magazine put the music video at number 14 on his list of Best Videos of 2011 and noted that the video was "the most energetic clip of the year, a utilization of all things – colour, composition, movement, editing – that used to make major label music videos 'events.'" Phoebe Reilly of Spin ranked the video at number nine on Spin's 10 Most Innovative Music Videos of 2011 list, writing that Knowles looked "damn adorable" while channeling Audrey Hepburn. NME's writers included "Countdown"'s music video at number eight on their list of 50 Best Music Videos of 2011 praising the rolling, multiple split screens as its highlight. In 2013, John Boone and Jennifer Cady of E! Online placed the video at number four on their list of Knowles' ten best music videos, writing that the star of the video is her growing Blue Ivy baby bump. As of January 2015, Billboard named the video as the sixth best music video of the 2010s (so far).

The music video for "Countdown" received a nomination in the category for Best Video at the NME Awards 2012 held in February. It was also nominated for Video of the Year at the 2012 BET Awards. It received three nominations at the 2012 MTV Video Music Awards in the categories Best Choreography, Best Editing and Most Share-Worthy Video. The video won the Best Editing category on September 6, 2012.

=== Controversy ===
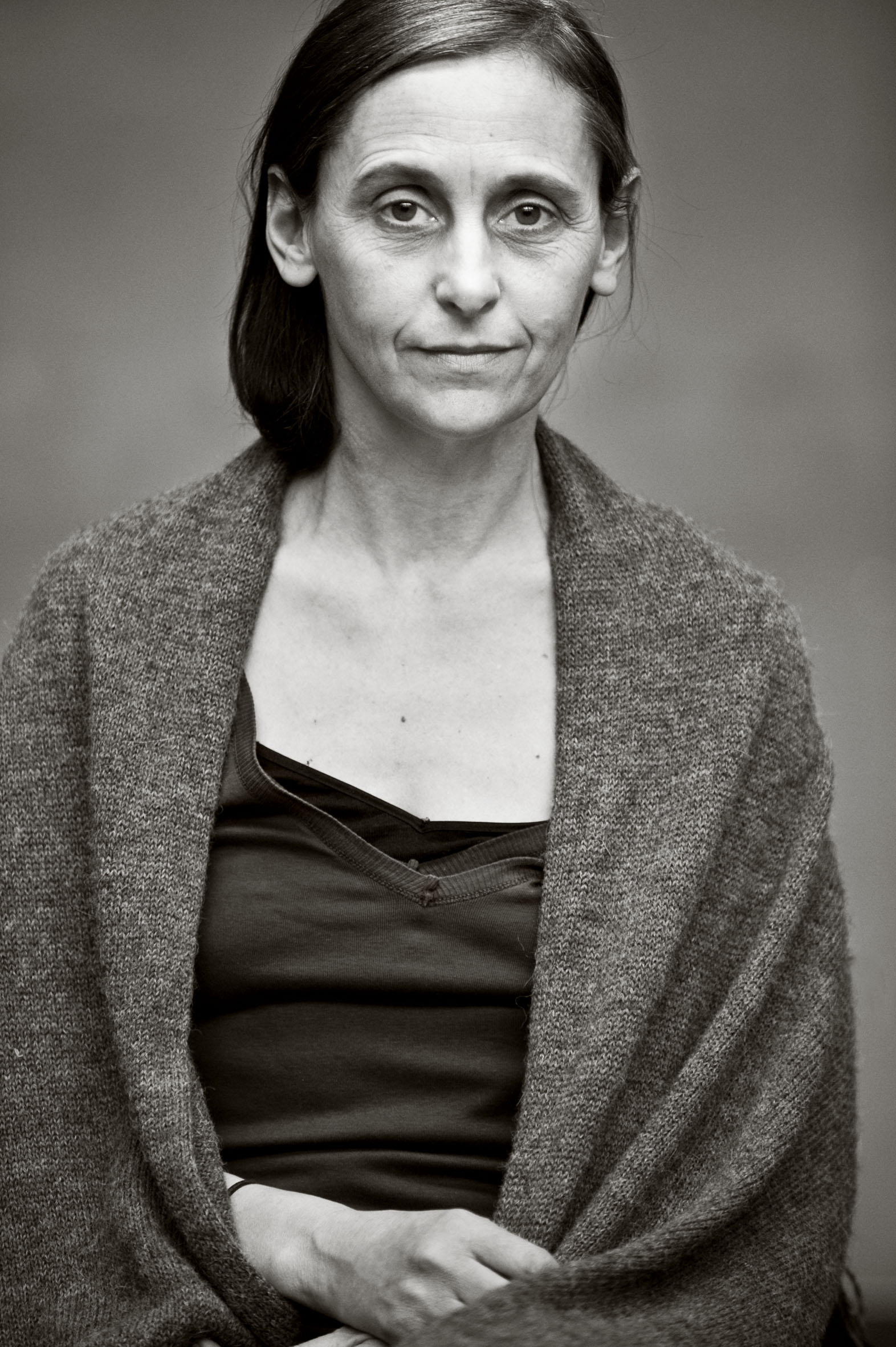
Anne Teresa De Keersmaeker (pictured), who affirmed that Knowles had borrowed liberally from two of her pieces, later revealed that she is neither angered nor honored by the tribute.

In an interview with Studio Brussel, Belgian choreographer Anne Teresa De Keersmaeker accused Knowles of using concepts from two of her pieces, Rosas danst Rosas (1983) and Achterlund (1990). De Keersmaeker commented, "It's a bit rude, [...] What’s rude about it its that they don’t even bother about hiding it", further adding that "this is pure plagiarism". Rosas spokeswoman Johanne De Bie added about the clip: "We noticed more than a few resemblances... We have passed the details to our lawyer to see about our rights." The director of the music video, Adria Petty, in an interview with MTV, stated that along with Knowles, had viewed some German modern dance clips as they were exploring cultural reference points, although she never mentioned De Keersmaeker specifically. She concluded that "very little of Keersmaeker's actual choreography inspired the finished result." An alternative video for "Countdown" premiered on November 28, 2011, and it excluded the dance moves from Anne Teresa De Keersmaeker's video.

In response to De Keersmaeker's comments, Knowles issued the following statement: "Clearly, the ballet Rosas danst Rosas was one of many references for my video 'Countdown'. It was one of the inspirations used to bring the feel and look of the song to life. I was also paying tribute to the film, Funny Face with the legendary Audrey Hepburn [...] My biggest inspirations were the [19]60s, the [19]70s, Brigitte Bardot, Andy Warhol, Twiggy and Diana Ross. I've always been fascinated by the way contemporary art uses different elements and references to produce something unique." Following Knowles' statement, De Keersmaeker wrote in a statement to The Performance Club that she was neither angry or honored about its usage, questioning why had it had taken so long for her work to reach popular culture. She also noticed a coincidence in that they were both pregnant during the filming of both videos, and wished Knowles the same joy her daughter had brought her.

== Live performances ==
On June 30, 2011, Knowles made a surprise appearance at the Target store in Harlem, New York, where kids from the local Boys and Girls Club danced onstage to "Countdown". In the middle of their performance, Knowles took the stage and gave them a big group hug before letting them continue their routine. Knowles told the crowd, "I'd like to thank the Boys and Girls Club for coming out. I hope y'all had fun learning the choreography to 'Countdown' today." Knowles sang the song live for first time on August 14, 2011, during her 4 Intimate Nights with Beyoncé in Roseland Ballroom, New York City. Wearing a gold dress, she performed the song in front of 3,500 people and she was backed by her all-female band, which includes, among others, two saxophonists, a sinuous guitar player, a seven-piece string section, a peppy pianist, a superfluous conductor, and her backing singers, called the Mamas. Erika Ramirez of Billboard magazine commented that "fans took the liberty to create individual dances in every pocket of the stadium" when Knowles was singing "Countdown".

Referring to "Countdown" as an "experimental [and] framing an expression of artistic freedom", Jody Rosen of Rolling Stone wrote that the song "made [Knowles'] case." Jozen Cummings of The Wall Street Journal commented that "when [Knowles] went up-tempo on songs like 'Countdown', her virtuosic ability to engage in crisp choreography without cracking her huge voice took center stage." Jocelyn Vena of MTV News concluded that "it was [Knowles'] ability to throw a party during faster jams like 'Party', 'Countdown', 'End of Time' and 'Run the World (Girls)' that put on full display her range as a performer, dancing and singing live the entire night."

A performance of Knowles singing "Countdown" live on Late Night with Jimmy Fallon was taped in July 2011. The performance aired on November 11, 2011. Backed by The Roots, Knowles gave her performance, wearing a black dress. During the ITV special A Night With Beyoncé which aired on December 4 in the United Kingdom, Knowles performed "Countdown" to a selected crowd of fans. In May 2012, Knowles performed "Countdown" during her Revel Presents: Beyoncé Live revue in Revel Atlantic City. The performance began with Knowles' "ululations and moans" as stated by Maura Johnston of The Village Voice. During the performance, scenes of the music video of the song were shown behind Knowles and the LED screens flashed blinding walls of color. Ben Ratliff of The New York Times mentioned "Countdown" in the "almost continuous high point" of the concert. Georgette Cline of The Boombox wrote that Knowles "got the crowd on their feet" with the performance of the song. "Countdown" served as a video interlude that preceded "Crazy in Love" during The Mrs. Carter Show World Tour in 2013. In 2016, the singer performed "Countdown" along with "Hold Up" during the set list of The Formation World Tour. She also included the song on her setlist for her co-headline OTR II tour with Jay-Z.

== Covers and usage in media ==
Norwegian singer Sondre Lerche covered "Countdown" in December 2011 as a "Christmas gift" and his favorite song of the year. He further stated, "I took the liberty of making some gender-oriented changes to the lyrics to better accommodate my macho-persona... That being said, the trick is to get passed the novelty-factor and just sing a beautiful song at the best of your abilities. Obviously, a significant part of this song's appeal and ecstatic energy comes from the dizzying vocal performance and the mind-blowingly cool production work — elements and talents useless to even attempt replicating (especially not in my father in-law's basement). But as long as there's a song underneath, there's a way." His cover of the song contains his vocals and mild acoustic guitar strumming, which according to Andrew Martin of Prefix Magazine gives "an approach that puts the focus on the track's stellar songwriting". According to Mallika Rao of The Huffington Post, "Sondre Lerche made us a gift... and probably because he's a talented, popular, professional musician, it's really good". Chris Coplan of Consequence of Sound praised the cover, saying: "The end result is a simple track, without pomp or circumstance or the crazy marching band, where Lerche is able to replicate not the high-energy feel, but the song's simple message of love and dedication. Thanks to its minimalist nature, the track isn't a corny display of pop mockery, but a demonstration of how universal great music can be."

Knowles appeared on Entertainment Tonight on June 16, 2011, to promote the exclusive-to-Target deluxe edition of 4, and gave fans a sneak preview of its television commercial. The 30-second commercial, which features "1+1" and "Countdown" playing in the background, began airing in the United States on June 24, 2011. In August 2011, "Countdown" was used in a commercial for the CBS fall television series previews. The instrumental of the song featured in Google's 2020 'Most Searched: A Celebration of Black History Makers' ad, which included Beyoncé's Beyoncé's 2018 Coachella performance as the most searched performance.

=== Snuggie version ===
On July 9, 2012, Ton Do-Nguyen, uploaded a shot-for-shot recreation of the clip on YouTube, wearing a snuggie. Throughout the video, the color-blocked style and the very fast cuts of the original are mimicked. The video went viral and gathered attention by media; Knowles herself responded to it on her website, calling it "brilliant", adding, "I think he did this video better than I did". Will Goodman of CBS News described it as an "amazing tribute" and the "cutest and most impressive tribute to Beyonce that has ever been done in the history of forever". Mawuse Ziegbe from The Boston Globe described it as a "highly produced tribute". Aisha Harris from Slate magazine described the editing of the video as "far superior to that of the average YouTube user", adding that Do-Nguyen transformed makeshift performance spaces like his basement into venues for "visual splendor". She concluded the review by writing that his attention to detail is "fascinating". Following the popularity of the remake, MTV asked Do-Nguyen to create a video mash-up of the Best Choreography nominees at the 2012 MTV Video Music Awards and gave him free tickets to the award show.

== Track listing ==
- Digital download
1. "Countdown" – 3:32
2. "Countdown" (RedTop Radio Edit – Clean) – 3:57
- Digital download – Remixes EP
1. "Countdown" – 3:31
2. "Countdown" (Reggae Rewind Remix) – 4:04
3. "Countdown" (Olli Collins & Fred Portelli Remix) – 6:10
4. "Countdown" (Jack Beats Remix) – 4:03
5. "Countdown" (Single Version) [Music Video] – 3:32

== Credits and personnel ==
Credits are taken from 4 liner notes.

- Beyoncé Knowles – vocals, producer, songwriter
- Alex Asher – trombone
- Michael Bivins – songwriter
- Ester Dean – songwriter
- Julie Frost – songwriter
- Cole-Kamen Green – trumpet
- Serban Ghenea – mixer
- John Hanes – engineer mixer
- Ryan Kelly – engineer assistant
- Lamb – co-production, songwriter
- Nathan Morris – songwriter
- Wanya Morris – songwriter
- Terius "The-Dream" Nash – songwriter
- Phil Seaford – engineer mix assistant
- Drew Sayers – saxophones
- Shea Taylor – production
- Nick Videen – tenor saxophone
- Pete Wolford – engineer assistant
- Josiah Woodson – trumpet
- Jordan "DJ Swivel" Young – engineer, vocal engineer

== Charts ==
=== Weekly charts ===
Chart (2011–2012)	Peak position
Austrian Singles Chart	65
Belgian Tip Chart (Flanders)	14
Brazilian Hot 100 Airplay	33
Canadian Hot 100	62
(Germany) Deutsche Black Charts	1
Global Dance Songs (Billboard)	19
Japan Hot 100	87
Irish Singles Chart	45
Netherlands (Dutch Tip Chart)	12
Netherlands (Single Top 100)	92
South Korea Gaon International Chart	40
UK Singles Chart	35
UK R&B Chart	9
US Billboard Hot 100	71
US Hot Dance Club Songs	1
US Hot R&B/Hip-Hop Songs	12
US Mainstream Top 40	36
US Rhythmic	25

=== Year-end charts ===
Chart (2012)	Position
US Hot R&B/Hip-Hop Songs	62

== Certifications ==
Region	Certification	Certified units/sales
Australia (ARIA)	Platinum	70,000^{‡}
Brazil (Pro-Música Brasil)	2× Platinum	120,000^{‡}
Canada (Music Canada)	Platinum	80,000^{‡}
New Zealand (RMNZ)	Gold	7,500^{*}
United Kingdom (BPI)	Gold	400,000^{‡}
United States (RIAA)	3× Platinum	3,000,000^{‡}
^{*} Sales figures based on certification alone.^{‡} Sales+streaming figures based on certification alone.

== Radio and release history ==
Country	Date	Format
United States	October 4, 2011	Mainstream and rhythmic radio
Belgium	October 21, 2011	Digital download
Luxembourg	October 21, 2011	Digital download
Germany	November 25, 2011	Digital download
Sweden	November 25, 2011	Digital download
Switzerland	November 25, 2011	Digital download
Austria	November 25, 2011	Remixes EP
Germany	November 25, 2011	Remixes EP
Switzerland	November 25, 2011	Remixes EP

== See also ==
- List of number-one dance singles of 2011 (U.S.)
