= Max (German magazine) =

Magazine published in Hamburg

- Editor in chief: Christian Krug
- Categories: Lifestyle magazine
- Frequency: monthly
- Circulation: 157,104 (2007)
- Publisher: MAX Verlag GmbH & Co. KG
- First issue: 1991
- Final issue: January/February 2008
- Country: Germany
- Based in: Hamburg
- Language: German
- Website: Max
- ISSN: 1617-5530

Max was a German language magazine published in Hamburg, Germany, from 1991 to 2008.

== History ==
Max was first published in 1991 and appeared monthly until the final issue which was a double issue for the months January and February 2008. It described itself as a photo and pop culture and lifestyle magazine.

The magazine was owned by MAX Verlag GmbH & Co. KG, part of the publishing group Verlagsgruppe Milchstraße, which has been 100% owned by Hubert Burda Media since 2004.

The circulation became continually lower according to the IVW figures. In the third quarter 2005, it had a circulation of 250,393, and in the third quarter 2006 220,333. During the same period, the number of subscriptions fell from 19,958 to 13,534.

In March 2006, the magazine started to publish multi-paged features of the best photos found on Flickr in the Flickr-Portfolio, which covered approximately 6 pages. This was controversial, because the Flickr photographers received no money.

On 11 January 2008, Hubert Burda Medien announced that they would stop publishing the magazine. The name of the magazine was to be kept for the publication of city guides. In 2011, a special "one shot" issue was published. Editors were the former chief editors of the magazine who chronicled their work, collected feedback and other input on a Facebook-fanpage, an idea they called "Gläserne Redaktion" (glass editorial office). After a moderate success, Hubert Burda Medien decided on publishing another special issue in 2012. This time, the editorial department was outsourced to the Storyboard GmbH in Munich. As for winter 2012, it is not decided yet, whether the special issues are to become an annual event.

The webpage continued after 2008 with a separate, small editorial staff. From fall 2011 to spring 2012, students of the Deutsche Journalistenschule wrote most of the articles on Max.de. After that, the site was run by a single editor who focused on pop culture, especially music, film and web phenomena. In winter 2012, a new editor took over to try out a new approach with pieces on adventurous and urban lifestyles. Since March 2013, there were no authors writing for Max.de, the side being updated with automatically imported articles from the German news agency dpa.
