= Cainon Lamb =

American record producer and songwriter

- Also known as: Lamb, Lamb Litty
- Born: Cainon Renard Lamb; March 22, 1978 (age 48); Miami, Florida, U.S.
- Genres: Pop; R&B; Hip hop; Urban pop
- Occupations: Record producer, songwriter, rapper, hype man
- Years active: 2004–present

Cainon Renard Lamb (born March 22, 1978), professionally known as Lamb or Lamb Litty, is an American record producer and songwriter from Miami, Florida. He has worked with artists including Beyoncé, SWV, Missy Elliott, Monica, Keyshia Cole and Jazmine Sullivan. In 2017, Lamb made his rapping debut on colleague Missy Elliott's single "I'm Better".

== Biography ==
=== Early life ===
A native of Miami, Florida, Lamb's involvement with music started in the church, as a drummer in the church band. As a youth, Lamb continued to develop his musical talents and excelled in sports, particularly football. He earned a full scholarship to Florida A&M University and became a wide receiver for the FAMU Rattlers football team. During his college years, Cainon Lamb was given an MPC, also known as a "Beat Machine," as a gift from his late mother Regina T. Lamb. He utilized his musical background to create music for his local gospel rap group, Against da Grain.

After graduating with a bachelor's degree in Criminal Justice, Lamb went on to play professional arena football with the Tallahassee Thunder and Florida Firecats. During his Firecats tenure as a record-breaking wide receiver, Lamb and his team won the ArenaCup Championship in 2004.

=== Music career ===
In 2004, Lamb's music caught the ear of Grammy Award-winning artist, producer, and songwriter Missy Elliott, who was given a beat CD through Lamb's affiliation with Elliott's Goldmind artist Lil Brianna. The CD contained a track which became Lamb's first major song placement—"Selfish (I Want You to Myself)" from American Idol winner Fantasia Barrino's 2004 debut album Free Yourself.

After retiring from football in late 2005, Lamb and Elliott went on to work with artists including Monica, Ruben Studdard, Fantasia, Missy Elliott, Keyshia Cole, Jazmine Sullivan, Trina and Jagged Edge.

In 2007, Lamb produced his first #1 record with Keyshia Cole's Grammy-nominated single "Let It Go". In 2008, Lamb went on to produce "Need U Bad," Jazmine Sullivan's debut single. He also produced "Holding You Down (Goin' in Circles)", the lead single from Jazmine's sophomore albumLove Me Back. In addition to producing songs on Monica's 5th studio album The Making of Me, in 2010 Lamb produced 3 songs for Monica's 6th studio album, Still Standing. While producing Monica's #1 hit single "Everything to Me", Lamb made his television debut on the December 8, 2009 episode of Monica's BET reality television show Monica: Still Standing.

In 2011, Lamb started his own company—Lambo Music Group.

That same year, he co-produced the track "Countdown" by Beyonce, which peaked at #1 on the Billboard Dance Club/Play Songs Chart.

2017 opened with Lamb making his first rapping debut on colleague Missy Elliott's single "I'm Better".

In 2018, Lamb began to release music as a solo artist with songs like “Tru Luv and "Ya Birthday." The latter includes the line "And now we sip lemonade like Beyoncè," a reference to the artist's 2016 album Lemonade in which she used a sample of a song Lamb produced for her called “Countdown” in the song “Hold Up”.

In late 2019, Lamb produced Ozuna Feat. Diddy & DJ Snake's single “Eres Top”. Lamb and his production partner Bigg D sample “I Need a Girl Part 2” by P. Diddy Featuring from Ginuwine, Loon, Mario Winans and Tammy Ruggeri in the song, which is the first single on Ozuna’s album Nibiru.

In 2020, Lamb and Bigg D signed new artists Rapper Love, Hip-Hop Miami, and social media star Sukihana under their production company 12th and Collins Ent.

== Discography ==
=== 2004 ===
Fantasia — Free Yourself

- 04. "Selfish (I Want You to Myself)" (co-produced by Missy Elliott)

=== 2006 ===
Fantasia — Fantasia

- 08. "I'm Not That Type" (co-produced by Missy Elliott)
- 10. "Two Weeks Notice" (co-produced by Missy Elliott)
- 13. "Sunshine" (co-produced by Harold Lilly)

Monica — The Makings of Me

- 06. "Doin' Me Right" (co-produced by Missy Elliott & Miguel "Pro" Castro)
- 07. "Raw"

Ruben Studdard — The Return

- 09. Ain't No Party

=== 2007 ===
Keyshia Cole — Just like You

- 01. "Let It Go" (featuring Lil' Kim & Missy Elliott) (co-produced by Missy Elliott) #1 for 8 weeks on the Billboard R&B/Hip-Hop Chart; #7 on the Billboard Hot 100

=== 2008 ===
Step Up 2: The Streets (soundtrack)

- 02. "Shake Your Pom Pom"
- 08. "Ching-a-Ling" (co-produced by Missy Elliott)

Jazmine Sullivan — Fearless

- 02. "Need U Bad" (co-produced by Missy Elliott) #1 for 8 weeks on the Billboard R&B/Hip-Hop Songs Chart
- 08. "Dream Big" (co-produced by Missy Elliott)

=== 2009 ===
Crystal Aikin — Crystal Aikin

- 06. "Love Him"

Billy Blue — Trap Certified (mixtape)

- 22. "Story of My Life"

=== 2010 ===
Monica — Still Standing

- 03. "Everything to Me" (co-produced by Missy Elliott) #1 for 8 weeks on the Billboard R&B/Hip-Hop Songs Chart
- 06. "If You Were My Man" (co-produced by Missy Elliott)
- 11. "Blackberry" (co-produced by Missy Elliott) [bonus track]

Jazmine Sullivan — Love Me Back

- 01. "Holding You Down (Goin' In Circles)" (co-produced by Missy Elliott) #3 for 8 weeks on the Billboard R&B/Hip-Hop Songs Chart
- 07. "Excuse Me" (co-produced by Missy Elliott)

Flo Rida Only One Flo (Part 1)

- 09. "Momma"
- Puzzle (promo single)

Trina — Amazin'

- 10. Always (featuring Monica)

=== 2011 ===
Beyoncé — 4

- 09. "Countdown" (co-produced by Beyoncé Knowles, Shea Taylor) #1 on Billboard Dance Club/Play Chart

Brianna — Face Off (mixtape)

- 03 — "I'm Super (Kim)"
- 05 — "Marilyn Monroe"

Jagged Edge — The Remedy

- 03. "Baby"
- 06. "I Need A Woman"

Git Fresh — Eat It Up (mixtape)

- 04. "She Be Like"

Isaac Carree — Uncommon Me

- 13. "Navigation"

=== 2012 ===
SWV — I Missed Us

- 01 "Co-Sign"
- 02. "All About You"
- 03. "Show Off"
- 04 "Everything I Love"
- 05. "Do Ya" (featuring Brianna Perry)
- 06. "The Best Years"
- 07. "I Missed Us"
- 08. "Better Than I"
- 09. "Keep You Home"

Monica — New Life

- 01. "New Life (Intro)"
- 05. "Big Mistake"
- 08. "Until It's Gone" (co-produced by Missy Elliott)
- 12. "New Life (Outro)"
- 13. "Breathe" (co-produced by Ray Ray)
- 14. "In 3D"
- 16. "Anything (To Find You)" (featuring Rick Ross) (co-produced by Missy Elliott)

Mandy Capristo — Grace

- 01. "Allow Me"

=== 2014 ===
Missy Elliott — Block Party

- 00. "Rather" (co-produced by Missy Elliott)

=== 2015 ===
Jay Burna — TBA

- 00. "Mood" (co-produced by Bigg D)

Ludacris – Ludaversal

- 17. “In My Life" (co-produced by Bigg D)

=== 2017 ===
Missy Elliott — Single

- 00. "I'm Better" (featuring Lamb)

=== 2018 ===
City Girls — PERIOD

- 02. "Take Yo Man" (co-produced by Bigg D)
- 06. "Where The Bag At" (co-produced by Bigg D)

DJ Nasty 305 — I Like

- 00. "I Like (featuring Lamb Litty, Ball Greezy, Tory Lanez & Mike Smiff)"

=== 2019 ===
PJ — One Missed Call

- 00. "One Missed Call"

PJ — My Best Life

- 00. "My Best Life"

Ball Greezy — I'm In Love

- 00. "I'm In Love"
