= Anything (To Find You) =

Single by Monica featuring Rick Ross

from the album New Life
- Released: August 2, 2011
- Length: 3:42
- Label: J; RCA
- Songwriters: Cainon Lamb; Henry Fuse; Jazmine Sullivan, Miguel Castro; Missy Elliott; William Roberts
- Producers: Missy Elliott; Lamb

Monica singles chronology
| "Here I Am" (2010) | "Anything (To Find You)" (2011) | "Until It's Gone" (2011) |

Rick Ross singles chronology
| "I'm on One" (2011) | "Anything (To Find You)" (2011) | "Fly Together" (2011) |

"Anything (To Find You)" is a song by American recording artist Monica taken from her seventh studio album, New Life (2012). It features additional vocals from American rapper Rick Ross, and was written and produced by longtime contributors Missy Elliott and Cainon Lamb with additional penning from fellow R&B singer Jazmine Sullivan, Henry Fuse, Miguel "Pro" Castro, and William Roberts. The song samples 1995's "Who Shot Ya?" performed by The Notorious B.I.G. and Diddy, and uses an interpolation of Marvin Gaye and Tammi Terrell's 1968 hit, "You're All I Need to Get By".

A lyrical homage to hip hop's beginnings, the song's initial version also featured American rapper Lil' Kim and was lined up for a release to urban radios in July 2011. However, by the time of its official digital release as the album's leading single, Kim's vocals had been removed entirely from the track due to contractual issues surrounding B.I.G.'s estate, headed by his mother. Released on August 2, 2011, as the album's first offering, the single version of "Anything" peaked at number twenty-five on the US Billboard Hot R&B/Hip-Hop Songs chart.

An R&B-up-tempo song, which exhibits elements of the early- to mid 1990s hip hop soul music, "Anything (To Find You)" was well received by music critics, who praised its retro theme and noted it a much-welcomed break from the Europop-dominated influence on contemporary R&B by the time of its release. An accompanying music video for the track was shot in Los Angeles and directed by Chris Robinson in August 2011. Featuring flashy 1990s fashions, boomboxes, and colorfully dressed dancers, the retro-themed video pays homage to the 1990s.

== Background ==
"Anything (To Find You)" was written by longtime contributor Missy Elliott along with singer Jazmine Sullivan and producer Cainon Lamb, all of which had contributed to Monica's previous single "Everything to Me" (2010), with additional writing by Henry Fuse, Miguel Castro, and William Roberts. The song contains portions The Notorious B.I.G.'s 1995 record, "Who Shot Ya?", written by Christopher Wallace, Sean Combs, Nashiem Sa-Allah Myrick, Herbert Magidson and Allie Wrubel, which again samples from 1972's "I'm Afraid the Masquerade Is Over", as performed by David Porter. "Anything (To Find You)" also contains elements of "You're All I Need to Get By" (1968), written by Ashford & Simpson and performed by Marvin Gaye and Tammi Terrell. Speaking of the recording of the song, which Monica described as an "homage to hip hop's beginnings", she elaborated: "[It] was basically a record where we knew we needed hip-hop flavor all across the board and the first thing I did was reach out to Lil Kim ... And when we sat back and we really listened to it, also we figured we wanted the fellas tofeel comfortable to. And with our mix of "Ladies' Night" with me, Missy and Kim, we all figured that Rick [Ross] was the man."

== Release ==
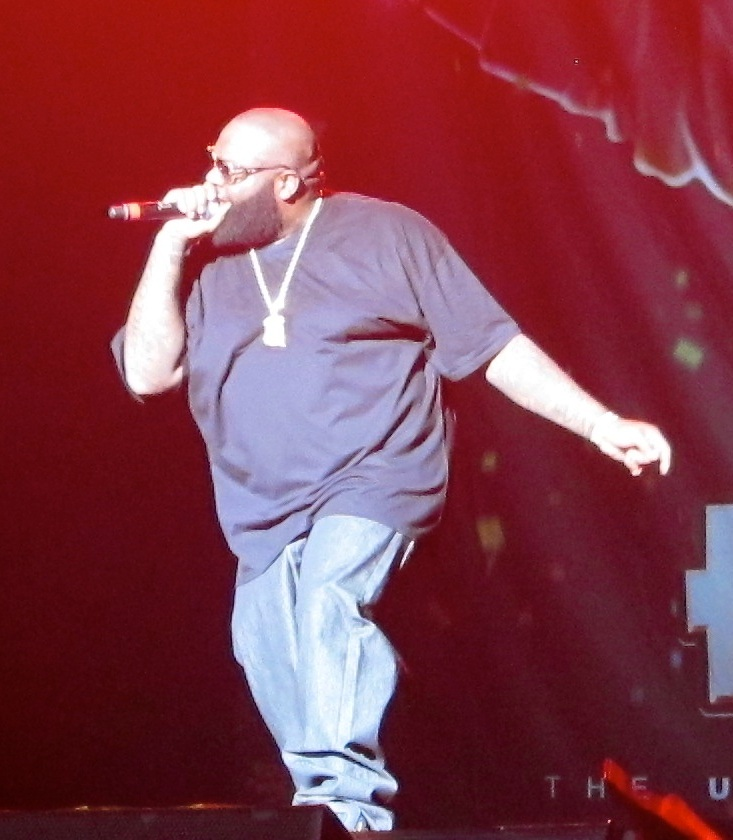
While rapper Rick Ross (left) became the song's only feature, Lil Kim also recorded vocals for "Anything (To Find You)".

On July 7, 2011, the full song was leaked onto the internet, featuring guest vocals by both rappers Lil' Kim and Rick Ross. Having initially recorded sixteen additional bars to the eight bars that appeared on the track, Kim's part was reportedly cut to make room for a second guest part, contributed by Ross. When the song made its debut on the Billboard R&B/Hip-Hop Songs chart in the week of July 14, 2011, Kim's name was not listed however. In a statement, J Records later confirmed that they were forced to remove her vocals from the official version at the last minute due to contractual issues as the sample that she used in her part — an excerpt of The Notorious B.I.G.'s controversial 1995 song "Who Shot Ya?" – was revoked by his mother Volleta Wallace, the head of B.I.G's estate. Addressing the issue on her Twitter account, Monica wrote:

I am just finding out what has happened to my single and myself and Missy are beyond hurt that Lil Kim was removed. She's our friend, a legend, and Lil Kim will get the respect she deserves at all cost. The clearance was revoked and I'm fighting to get it reinstated by the Biggie Estate ... I am as thorough as they come and I Love Lil Kim, bottom line is Ms Wallace has the final say and she said No. If we put it out we get sued.

The original version of the song, featuring all sixteen bars recorded by Lil' Kim, was leaked on July 30, 2011.

== Reception ==
The single has been generally well received by critics. Rap-Up favored the track stating that "Monica takes listeners back to R&B's glory days with her soulful voice, Rozay channels Biggie, and the Queen Bee delivers a short, yet stinging verse." ThatGrapeJuice noted that the song "will be sure to entice Urban disc-jockeys everywhere this summer," and further added, "what many will find to be a much needed breath of fresh air in Europop centric world, Monica has once again proven why she is the kind of artist whose creativity and skill is firmly based in her ability to deliver enjoyable music." Billboard called the track "a throwback to '90s hip-hop," adding: "Monica arrives with lyrics that combine attitude and vulnerability ... With "Anything (To Find You)", she das issued another soft jam to secure her status as an R&B queen in the company of Mary J. Blige."

Before being released as a digital download and rhythmic radio, "Anything (To Find You)" instantly debuted at number 71 on the US Billboard Hot R&B/Hip-Hop Songs chart on July 14, 2011, based on airplay alone. Afterwards it jumped from number fifty-seven to fifty-one on that particular chart, before eventually entering the top 30. Reaching its peak position of number 25, it became Monica's least successful lead single since 2002's "All Eyez on Me.". However, the song became Monica's sixteenth top forty entry on the Billboard Hot R&B/Hip-Hop Tracks chart, and due to digital downloads debuted and peaked at number 19 in the Bubbling Under Hot 100 Singles.

== Music video ==
=== Background ===
One of the fashionable light-tinged scenes from the video, where Monica sings dancing.

The music video for "Anything (To Find You)" was directed by frequent collaborator Chris Robinson. As reported by herself on Twitter, Monica and rapper Rick Ross filmed the clip in Los Angeles, California, on August 18, 2011. Based on a concept developed by the singer and Robinson, the video shoot called for multiple flashy 1990s fashions, boomboxes, colorfully dressed dancers, and jewelry by designer Simone I. Smith. Monica summed the retro-themed video as being about "paying homage to the era that made [her] – 90s baby."

The full music video exclusively premiered through the Vevo network on September 11, 2011, a day earlier than planned, on Monica's Vevo account. It made its television debut on September 12, 2011, during an episode of BET's format 106 & Park, where it eventually reached the top spot on the show's music video countdown.

=== Synopsis ===
Summed up by Essence magazine, "Monica channels the '90s in her latest video [for] "Anything (To Find You)", [presenting] a heavy influence from Mary J. Blige." The video opens in a lit warehouse, with Brown walking in the passageway before it cuts to her standing with her arms folded. She then kneels down and began to sing the into verse of the song. The clip then shows Rick Ross in his own scene rapping his verse to the song. Monica goes into her first verse with three girls choreographed routines with a 1980s vibe. Doing the first run of the hook, Monica is seen singing on a bed and sitting on a curb with gold lights in the background. The video then continues with another scene of Monica singing behind a gold background with a black tank top and with a white jumpsuit. After the scenes quickly jumped from another, the video then ends with Monica 2-stepping and singing her final lines from the song.

== Credits and personnel ==
Credits are taken from New Life liner notes.

- Miguel "Pro" Castro – engineering, keyboards
- Missy Elliott – engineering, production
- Henry "Henny" Fuse – keyboards
- Chris Galland – mixing assistance
- Cainon Lamb – co-production
- Erik Madrid – mixing assistance
- Manny Marroquin – mixing
- Taurian "TJ" Osbourne – keyboards

== Charts ==
Chart performance for "Anything (To Find You)"
| Chart (2011) | Peak position |
|---|---|
| South Korea International (Circle) | 30 |
| US Bubbling Under Hot 100 (Billboard) | 19 |
| US Hot R&B/Hip-Hop Songs (Billboard) | 25 |

== Release history ==
Release dates and formats for "Anything (To Find You)"
| Country | Date | Format | Label | Ref. |
|---|---|---|---|---|
| United States | August 2, 2011 | Digital single | J | |
| United States | August 8, 2011+ | Urban Mainstream radio | J | |
| United States | August 30, 2011 | Rhythmic radio | J | |
