= India Shawn =

- Born: India Shawn Boodram; March 25, 1988 (age 38)
- Origin: Los Angeles, CA
- Genres: R&B
- Occupation: Singer-songwriter
- Years active: 2012–present
- Labels: Epic; Hollywood; Vanta

India Shawn Boodram (born March 25, 1988) is an American R&B singer-songwriter based in Los Angeles and signed to Vanta Music. She has released four EPs, most recently Subject to Change in 2026, and her debut album, Before We Go (Deeper), was released on Epic Records in 2022.

== Early life ==
Shawn was born in Los Angeles, and moved to Atlanta while in high school.

== Career ==
Early in her career, Shawn wrote songs for artists including Chris Brown, El DeBarge, Keri Hilson, and Monica. Shawn released her debut EP, Origin, in 2012. In 2013, her song "I'm Alive" was included on Solange's Saint Heron compilation album. Shawn collaborated with James Fauntleroy on the 2015 song "Floating Away", and the two went on to collaborate on the EP Outer Limits, released in March 2015. Shawn also sang background vocals on "This Has Been My World" - the final track on the Ludacris album, Ludaversal.

After signing with Epic Records in 2020, she released the double single "Cali Love" and "Not Too Deep" featuring 6lack. That summer, she collaborated with Anderson .Paak on the 2020 single "Movin' On", which was featured in an episode of the HBO series Insecure. She collaborated with Unknown Mortal Orchestra on her single "Too Sweet", released on February 26, 2021.

On November 11, 2021, Shawn released the EP Before We Go on Epic Records. On July 22, 2022, she released her debut album, Before We Go (Deeper), also on Epic, with the release including all the songs from her 2021 EP alongside several new tracks. The album was produced by D'Mile, and features collaborations with Anderson .Paak, 6lack, Ambré, and Cory Henry.

Shawn sang background vocals on Harry Styles' 2022 album Harry's House. In 2024, she released the single "There Must Be a God", from the soundtrack for the film She Taught Love. On June 13, 2025, she released the single "Kill Switch", along with a video starring herself and Luke James. On August 1, 2025, she released the single "Cotton Candy Blvd" featuring Lucky Daye. On October 10, 2025, she released the single "Gone", which she co-wrote with D'Mile (who also produced), Bianca Atterberry, and Jean Baptiste Kouame.

On April 7, 2026, Shawn released the single "Rain on Me", in advance of her EP Subject to Change, which was released on Vanta Music on May 1, 2026.

== Performances ==
Shawn had a co-headlining tour with Free Nationals, has opened for 6lack and Mayer Hawthorne, and has toured as a background vocalist for Anderson .Paak, Daniel Caesar, and Willow Smith. As a vocalist with Free Nationals, she performed on their Tiny Desk concert and opened for Gary Clark Jr. She sung background for Harry Styles for his performances at the 2020 Jingle Ball and 2021 Grammy Awards, performed at Lollapalooza in Chicago in 2022, and was a part of Ye's Sunday Service at Coachella.

In 2022, in support of her album Before We Go (Deeper), Shawn went on a six-city US headlining tour, joined by Zyah Belle, Remey Williams, and Brik.Liam. In 2025, she went on tour in support of Free Nationals and Giveon.

== Discography ==
=== Albums ===
| Title | Release details |
|---|---|
| Before We Go (Deeper) | Released: July 22, 2022; Label: Epic Records; Formats: LP, digital download, streaming |

=== EPs ===
| Title | Release details |
|---|---|
| Origin | Released: November 13, 2012; Label: Self-released; Formats: Digital download, streaming |
| Outer Limits (with James Fauntleroy) | Released: March 4, 2015; Label: Self-released; Formats: Digital download, streaming |
| Before We Go | Released: November 11, 2021; Label: Epic Records; Formats: Digital download, streaming |
| Subject to Change | Released: May 1, 2026; Label: Vanta Music; Formats: Digital download, streaming |

=== Singles ===
| Year | Title | Album |
|---|---|---|
| 2013 | "I'm Alive" | Origin |
| 2017 | "Galaxies" | Non-album singles |
| 2018 | "Water Me" feat. Alex Isley and Ré Lxuise | Non-album singles |
| 2020 | "Cali Love" | Before We Go |
| 2020 | "Not Too Deep" feat. 6lack | Before We Go |
| 2020 | "Movin' On" feat. Anderson .Paak | Before We Go |
| 2021 | "Too Sweet" feat. Unknown Mortal Orchestra | Before We Go |
| 2021 | "Don't Play With My Heart" | Before We Go |
| 2022 | "Exchange" | Before We Go (Deeper) |
| 2024 | "There Must Be a God" | She Taught Love OST |
| 2025 | "Kill Switch" | Non-album singles |
| 2025 | "Cotton Candy Blvd" feat. Lucky Daye | Non-album singles |
| 2025 | "Gone" | Non-album singles |
| 2026 | "Rain on Me" | Subject to Change |

=== Featured on ===
- "Yours" – Dixson feat. India Shawn (2021)
- "No More Maybes" – TAVE feat. Bibi Bourelly and India Shawn (2024)
