= MyVideo =

Video hosting website

- Available in: German
- Dissolved: April 2016
- Headquarters: Germany
- Website: http://www.myvideo.de/

MyVideo was a German video hosting service website, provided by Magic Internet based in Bucharest, Romania and later in Berlin.

It was available in German (myvideo.de, myvideo.ch, and myvideo.at) until April 2016. According to Alexa Internet, the German domain name was one of the 1,000 most visited websites on the Internet.

The service was founded in 2006, and had over 200,000 daily visitors in 2011.

The users had the possibility to upload, rate and watch videos and to share them over social networks.

Today MyVideo is an entertainment news platform of maxdome, a video on demand service of ProSiebenSat.1 Media. The former video hosting service was replaced by quazer.com and later sold to Pluto TV.
