= List of awards and nominations received by Monica =

Monica awards and nominations
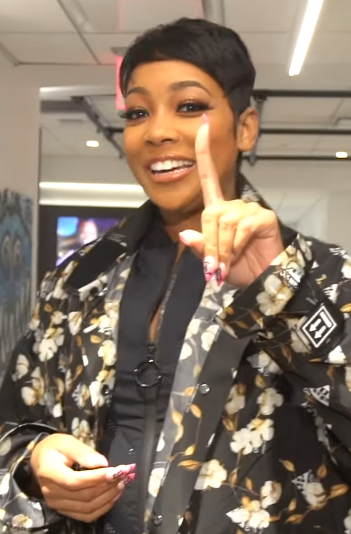
Awards and nominations
Award	Wins	Nominations
American Music Awards	0	1
Billboard	1	5
Grammy	1	5
MTV VMA	0	2
Soul Train	1	11

Totals (Note: Certain award groups do not simply award one winner. They acknowledge several different recipients, have runners-up, and have third place. Since this is a specific recognition and is different from losing an award, runner-up mentions are considered wins in this award tally. For simplification and to avoid errors, each award in this list has been presumed to have had a prior nomination.)
- Wins: 10
- Nominations: 43

Monica is an American singer and actress; she was discovered by music producer Dallas Austin in 1991. The singer achieved worldwide success in 1998 with her second album The Boy Is Mine, which featured the singles "The Boy Is Mine", "The First Night", and "Angel of Mine".

The single "The Boy Is Mine", a duet with Brandy, reached number one in several countries, including Canada, The Netherlands, New Zealand, and on the Billboard Hot 100. Both singers won a Billboard Music Video Award for Best R&B/Urban Clip for the video. The video also nabbed two MTV Video Music Awards nominations.

On the Billboard Year-End List, the song ranked number 1 on the Hot Dance Maxi-Singles Sales, Hot 100 Singles Sales, and Hot R&B Singles Sales charts. In 1999, she and Brandy won a Grammy Award for Best R&B Performance By a Duo or Group. In 2020 Monica was honored with the Lady of Soul Award at the Soul Train Music Awards.

== American Music Awards ==
The American Music Awards is an annual awards ceremony created by Dick Clark in 1973. Monica has received one nomination.

Year	Nominee / work	Award	Result	Ref.
1996	Herself	Favorite Soul/R&B New Artist	Nominated	

== BDS Certified Spin Awards ==
Year	Nominee / work	Award	Result	Ref.
2003	"So Gone"	100,000 Spins	Won	
2004	"U Should've Known Better"	100,000 Spins	Won	
2006	"Everytime tha Beat Drop"	50,000 Spins	Won	

== BET Awards ==
The BET Awards were established in 2001 by the Black Entertainment Television (BET) network. Monica has received one awards from three nominations.

Year	Nominee / work	Award	Result	Ref.
2004	Herself	Best Female R&B Artist	Nominated	
2010	Herself	Centric Award	Won	
2010	"Everything to Me"	Viewer's Choice	Nominated	

== Billboard Music Awards ==
Year	Nominee / work	Award	Result	Ref.
2004	Herself	R&B/Hip-Hop Artist of the Year - Female	Nominated	
2011	Herself	Top R&B Artist	Nominated	
2011	"Still Standing"	Top R&B Album	Nominated	

== Billboard Music Video Awards ==
Year	Nominee / work	Award	Result	Ref.
1995	Don't Take It Personal	Best R&B/Urban Clip	Nominated	
1995	Don't Take It Personal	Best New R&B/Urban Artist Clip	Nominated	
1998	The Boy Is Mine	Best R&B/Urban Clip	Won	

== Billboard R&B/Hip-Hop Awards ==
Year	Nominee / work	Award	Result	Ref.
2004	Monica	Top R&B/Hip Hop Female Artist	Nominated	

== Billboard Year-End List ==
Year	Nominee / work	Award	Result	Ref.
1995	Herself	Top R&B Artists	17th Place	
1995	Herself	Top New R&B Artists	8th Place	
1995	Herself	Top R&B Artists – Female	5th Place	
1996	Herself	Top R&B Artists	3rd Place	
1996	Herself	Top R&B Artists – Female	1st Place	
1998	"The Boy Is Mine"	Hot Dance Maxi–Singles Sales	1st Place	
1998	"The Boy Is Mine"	Hot 100 Singles Sales	1st Place	
1998	"The Boy Is Mine"	Hot R&B Singles Sales	1st Place	

== City of Atlanta Phoenix Awards ==
Year	Nominee / work	Award	Result	Ref.
1999	Herself	Phoenix Award	Honoree	

== Grammy Awards ==
The Grammy Awards are awarded annually by the National Academy of Recording Arts and Sciences.

Year	Nominee / work	Award	Result	Ref.
1999	"The Boy Is Mine"	Record of the Year	Nominated	
1999	"The Boy Is Mine"	Best R&B Performance by a Duo or Group with Vocals	Won	
2011	"Everything to Me"	Best Female R&B Vocal Performance	Nominated	
2011	Still Standing	Best R&B Album	Nominated	
2025	"The Boy Is Mine" (with Ariana Grande & Brandy)	Best Pop Duo/Group Performance	Nominated	

== Groovevolt Music & Fashion Awards ==
Year	Nominee / work	Award	Result	Ref.
2004	After the Storm	Best Album — Female	Nominated	
2005	U Should've Known Better	Best Song Performance — Female	Nominated	
2005	Class Reunion (shared with Wyclef Jean)	Best Deep Cut	Won	

== MOBO ==
The MOBO Awards (an acronym for Music of Black Origin) were established in 1996 by Kanya King. They are held annually in the United Kingdom to recognize artists of any race or nationality performing music of black origin.

Year	Nominee / work	Award	Result	Ref.
1998	"The Boy Is Mine"	Best International Single	Nominated	

== MTV Video Music Awards ==
The MTV Video Music Awards is an annual awards ceremony established in 1984 by MTV. Monica has received two nominations.

Year	Nominee / work	Award	Result	Ref.
1998	"The Boy Is Mine"	Best R&B Video	Nominated	
1998	"The Boy Is Mine"	Video of the Year	Nominated	

== NAACP Image Awards ==
Year	Nominee / work	Award	Result	Ref.
1996	Herself	Outstanding New Artist	Nominated	
1999	Brandy & Monica	Outstanding Duo or Group (for "The Boy Is Mine")	Nominated	
1999	Brandy & Monica	Outstanding Music Video (for "The Boy Is Mine")	Nominated	
2000	Herself	Outstanding Female Artist	Nominated	

== Soul Train Music Awards ==
The Soul Train Music Awards is an annual awards show that honors black musicians and entertainers. Monica has received one award out of twelve nominations.

Year	Nominee / work	Award	Result	Ref.
1996	"Like This and Like That" / "Before You Walk Out of My Life"	Best R&B/Soul Single - Female	Nominated	
1996	Miss Thang	Best R&B/Soul Album - Female	Nominated	
1996	Herself	Best R&B/Soul or Rap New Artist	Nominated	
1997	"Why I Love You So Much"	Best R&B/Soul Single - Female	Nominated	
1998	"For You I Will"	Best R&B/Soul Single - Female	Nominated	
1999	"The Boy Is Mine"	Best R&B/Soul Single; Group, Band or Duo (with Brandy)	Nominated	
2007	The Makings of Me	Best R&B/Soul Album - Female	Nominated	
2009	"Trust" (with Keyshia Cole)	Best Collaboration	Nominated	
2010	Herself	Best R&B/Soul Artist - Female	Nominated	
2010	"Everything to Me"	Song of the Year	Nominated	
2020	Herself	Soul Train Certified Award	Nominated	
2020	Herself	Lady of Soul Award	Won	

== Soul Train Lady of Soul Awards ==
Year	Nominee / work	Award	Result	Ref.
1996	"Like This and Like That" / "Before You Walk Out of My Life"	Best R&B Soul Single - Solo	Nominated	
1996	Miss Thang	R&B/Soul Album of the Year - Solo	Nominated	
1999	"The Boy Is Mine"	Best R&B/Soul Single, Group, Band Or Duo (with Brandy)	Nominated	
1999	"Angel of Mine"	Best R&B Soul Single - Solo	Nominated	
1999	The Boy Is Mine	R&B/Soul Album of the Year - Solo	Nominated	
2003	"So Gone"	Best R&B/Soul Single - Solo	Nominated	

== Source Hip-Hop Music Awards ==
Year	Nominee / work	Award	Result	Ref.
2004	Herself	R&B Artist of the Year — Female	Nominated	

== Teen Choice Awards ==
Year	Nominee / work	Award	Result	Ref.
1999	Herself	Choice Music: Female Artist	Nominated	
1999	The Boy Is Mine	Choice Music: Album	Nominated	
2003	So Gone	Choice Music: R&B/Hip-Hop Track	Nominated	

== Young Hollywood Hall of Fame ==
Year	Nominated work / Recipient	Category	Result	Ref.
1999	Herself	Music Artist	Inducted	

== YoungStar Awards ==
Year	Nominee / work	Award	Result	Ref.
1998	Herself	Best Performance by a Young Recording Group or Artist	Nominated	
