= After the Storm (Monica album) =

Studio album by Monica
- Released: June 17, 2003
- Genre: R&B
- Length: 52:34
- Label: J
- Producers: BAM & Ryan; Peter Biker; Craig Brockman; Bryan-Michael Cox; Jasper DaFatso; Jermaine Dupri; Missy Elliott; Rodney Jerkins; Jazze Pha; Soulshock & Karlin

Monica chronology
All Eyez on Me (2002)	After the Storm (2003)	The Makings of Me (2006)

Singles from After the Storm
- 1. "So Gone" Released: April 8, 2003; 2. "Knock Knock"/"Get It Off" Released: September 2003; 3. "U Should've Known Better" Released: May 18, 2004

After the Storm is the fourth album by the American singer Monica. It was first released on June 17, 2003, through J Records. Developed over three years amid personal struggles, the project faced multiple delays following the moderate success and bootlegging of the album's previous incarnation All Eyez on Me (2002), leading Monica to scrap much of the original material and start anew with collaborators, including Jazze Pha, BAM & Ryan, and Missy Elliott, the latter of whom served as executive producer and re-shaped much of After the Storm with her sample-heavy signature production and creative vision.

The album earned mixed to positive reviews, with critics praising Monica's vocal growth and Elliott's standout contributions while criticizing the album's uneven pacing. It debuted at number one on the US Billboard 200, becoming Monica's first album to top the chart, with first-week sales of 185,500 copies. The album was later certified gold by the Recording Industry Association of America (RIAA) and had sold 1,023,000 copies in the United States as of November 2014. Despite its domestic success, it was less successful internationally than her previous album, The Boy Is Mine (1998).

After the Storm spawned four singles that achieved notable success on the Billboard charts. Lead single "So Gone" became Monica’s biggest hit in years, reaching number 10 on the US Billboard Hot 100 and number 20 in Canada, while also topping Billboard's Hot R&B/Hip-Hop Singles & Tracks and Hot Dance Club Play charts. The album's fourth and final single, "U Should've Known Better," peaked at number 19 in the United States and became a top ten hit on the R&B chart. Monica would later reteam with many of the album's collaborators on her subsequent project The Makings of Me (2006).

== Background ==
Following the release of her second album The Boy Is Mine (1998) and her contribution to "I've Got to Have It," a collaboration with Jermaine Dupri and rapper Nas, recorded for the soundtrack of the 2000 comedy film Big Momma's House, Monica took a hiatus from her recording career. During the hiatus, she pursued acting, completing roles on J. J. Abrams's prime time drama series Felicity and the theatrical film Boys and Girls (2000) and garnered a starring role in the MTV Films drama Love Song (2000). In a June 2000 interview with MTV News amid promotion for Oscar Mayer's Jingle Jam Talent Search contest, Monica revealed that she was planning to start work on her third, self-titled album throughout the summer season, with a first single to be released by October of the same year.

The following month, production on the album was temporarily halted after Monica's friend and former boyfriend, Jarvis "Knot" Weems, died by suicide, leaving behind a daughter from a previous relationship, whom Monica took into her care during her hiatus. She eventually resumed work on the project in fall 2001, involving her usual stable of producers such as Dallas Austin, production team Soulshock & Karlin, Jermaine Dupri, and Rodney Jerkins and his Darkchild crew. Although the album, eventually titled All Eyez on Me, was originally intended for a worldwide release, it was released on October 21, 2002, exclusively in Japan. Its US release had initially been scheduled for July 2002, then delayed to September, and finally set for November 12. By the time of its planned domestic release, however, the album had already been heavily bootlegged in Japan and circulated widely through Internet file-sharing services. Additionally, the first two singles from the project, "All Eyez on Me" and "Too Hood," achieved moderate chart success.

== Conceptualization ==
Amid rapid changes in the music market and a shift in urban radio toward hip hop and edgier sounds, J Records asked Monica to substantially reconstruct the record with a host of new producers, leading to the cancellation of the US release of All Eyez on Me. After the commercial failure of original lead single "All Eyez on Me," an upbeat, pop-influenced track that the label felt had given the impression that she was moving away from her core R&B audience, Monica agreed that she would once again return to the studio, significantly raising the financial stakes of the project. Fresh from the success of her album Under Construction (2002), the label consulted rapper-producer Missy Elliott to work with her. Frustrated that the album had not yet reflected her artistic vision, Monica connected with Elliott during their first session in a Miami studio, where Elliott played sample-heavy demos with old-school soul influences to her. The pair recorded three full-length songs together that altered the course of the album and prompted J Records to replace former executive producer Jermaine Dupri with Elliott. Additional recording sessions were set up with producers BAM & Ryan, Jasper DaFatso, and Jazze Pha, with rappers DMX, Dirtbag, Busta Rhymes and Mia X, and singers Tweet and Tyrese joining. Labelmate Mýa was initially set to feature on a track but was replaced by Faith Evans, although the song was ultimately left unused.

Although the project was still planned to be titled All Eyez on Me until its completion, Monica ultimately chose a more personal name to reflect the challenges and private struggles she had experienced over the years, also including the deaths of her grandmother and her cousin and friend Selena Glenn from a brain aneurysm as well as the incarceration of her former partner, rapper C-Murder, on second-degree murder charges, describing the material as a testimony of her life and artistic journey. In an interview with Jet magazine, she commented in 2003: "I feel blessed to still be here after a lot of things that I've been through. I wanted to share certain things with people. Not so much as what I've been through, but how I made it through. That's what the album reflects [...] It's really the reason I titled my album After the Storm." The revamp also led to a redesign of the album's packaging, with J Records enlisting South African photographer Warwick Saint to shoot new photos for the project, replacing Joshua Jordan, who had photographed the artwork for All Eyez on Me. In a 2016 retrospective, Monica reflected on the album: "Everything about After the Storm was about my life after the hardship. This album came when I felt whole enough to make a record again." She further elaborated in 2020, expressing her hope that the album would reach listeners facing their own challenges and provide them with encouragement, writing on Instagram that her "sincerest prayer is that it reaches somebody in the midst right now and gives them hope to make it [through] the storm."

== Songs ==
The standard edition of After the Storm comprises thirteen tracks, five of which were transferred from All Eyez on Me. It opens with "Intro", a skit about people stuck in a traffic jam that ends in a drive-by shooting provoked by someone, voiced by Missy Elliott, playing Monica's "So Gone" too loudly. After the Storm then launches into the Elliott-crafted song "Get It Off", a club-friendly, percussive, 1980s-style jam with a percolating groove, that samples American hip hop group Strafe's single "Set It Off" (1984) and features uncredited vocals from rapper Dirtbag. Third track "So Gone", another retro-soul song, has a 1970s soul groove that samples from American vocal group the Whispers' "You Are Number One" (1976) and is built upon old-school touches including horns and vinyl surface noise. Elliott convinced Monica to record a rap portion for the song, which is about a woman almost losing her mind over an unfaithful lover. The singer explores a painful personal relationship on "U Should've Known Better", a Jermaine Dupri-produced slow jam, set against a pulsating backbeat, about a girl who stands by her man during his jail term. Co-written by Monica herself, it was inspired by her relationship with rapper C-Murder.

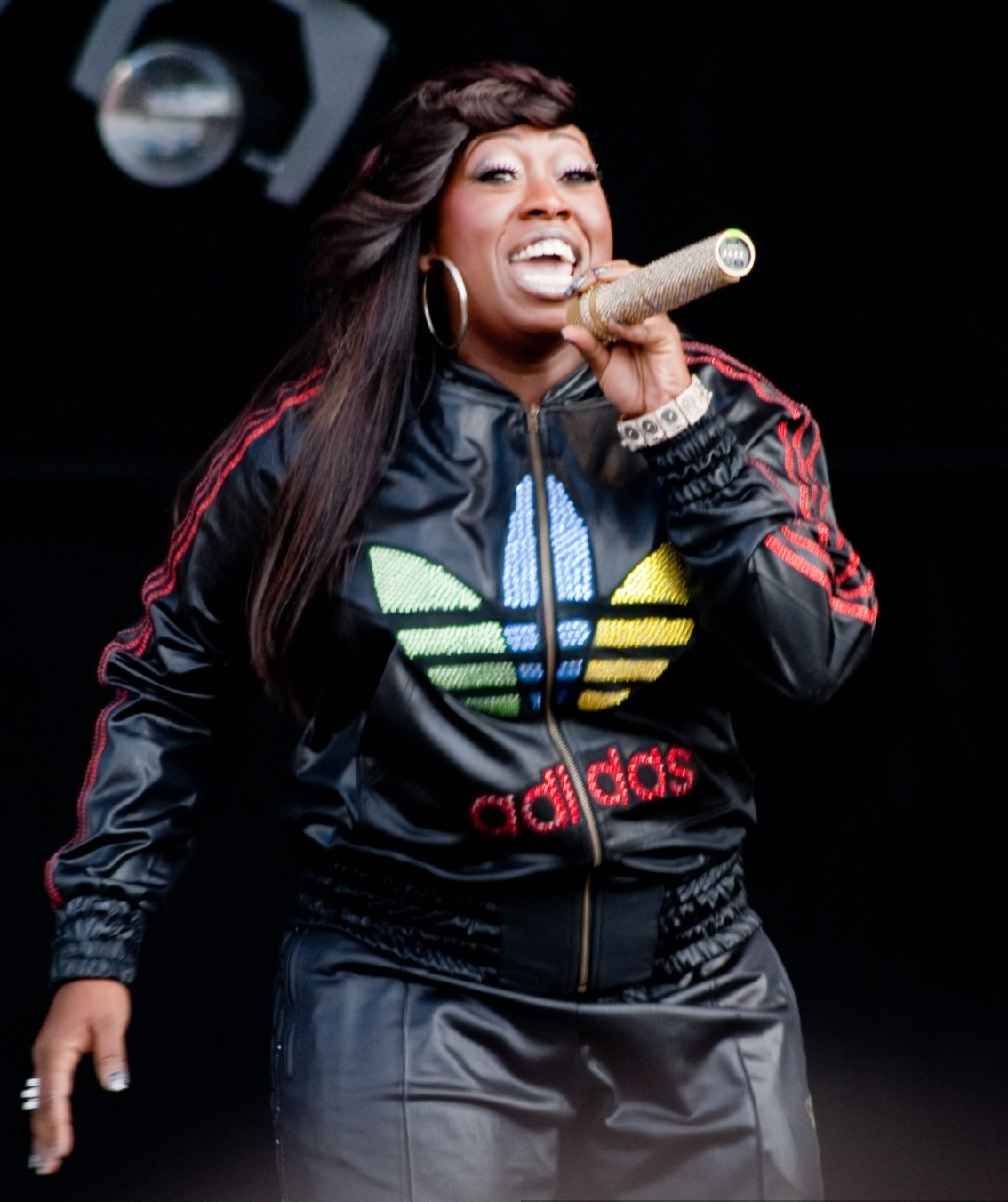
Missy Elliott (pictured) replaced Jermaine Dupri as After the Storm's executive producer.

Monica plays the other woman in "Don't Gotta Go Home", a sassy, guitar-led duet, produced by BAM & Ryan, with rapper DMX as her straying husband. "Knock Knock", a "get back record" and thematic sequel to "So Gone", also produced by Elliott, similarly features old-school soul sounds, sampling from American vocal band The Masqueraders' "It's a Terrible Thing to Waste Your Love" (1976). It was described as "erotic boogie fare", in which she sends away a lover who used to take her for granted. Rapper Kanye West, whose mixtape track "Apologize" (2005) the Monica song is based on, is credited as a co-producer. "Breaks My Heart", produced by Danish duo Soulshock and Karlin, is a "heartbreaking personal lament" in which "a classic slow rhythm-and-blues piano rolls", while the singer "apologizes to the man who stayed with her despite her affairs". Eighth track "I Wrote This Song", neatly set off by a sample from American singer Shuggie Otis' "Aht Uh Mi Hed" (1970), deals with Weems' suicide. Monica commented that writing the song, her first ever composition, was a healing process for her as well as a "way of sharing the intimate situation between [them]."

Rodney Jerkins-produced "Ain't Gonna Cry No More," a mid-tempo song about a young woman who falls for a man with a hidden family, was described as an upbeat "angry kiss-off". "Go to Bed Mad", a duet with singer Tyrese, is a "soulful" and "heartfelt jam" that has a couple asking each other to compromise after an argument before they go to bed at night. On pop ballad "Hurts the Most", another Soulshock and Karlin contribution, consisting of acoustic guitars and an understated drum pattern, Monica says goodbye to a former lover who has entered a new relationship since their last meeting, though she still pines for him. Jazze Pha-produced "That's My Man" is an acoustic-guitar-laced mid-tempo track, talking about a woman's proudness of her man. The standard edition of After the Storm ends with "Outro", a remix version of "So Gone", that features rapper Busta Rhymes as well as more prominent background vocals from singer Tweet. Monica admitted that she was initially intimidated by recording her rhymes alongside Rhymes. Bonus track "Too Hood", an upbeat song featuring Dupri, was described as "an image-mongering song in which Monica tells a guy who's not rough enough that she's 'too hood' for" him, while "Searchin'" is a reflective track in which she offers comfort to those grieving the loss of family and friends from the September 11 attacks.

== Promotion ==
After the album's original first two singles, "All Eyez on Me" and "Too Hood," underperformed commercially, both tracks were omitted from the standard edition of After the Storm, with J Records and Monica instead choosing Missy Elliott–produced "So Gone" as the album's lead single. Released in April 2003, the song became the singer's biggest commercial successes in years, reaching number 10 on the US Billboard Hot 100, while also spending five consecutive weeks on top of Billboard's Hot R&B/Hip-Hop Songs chart. It also topped US Dance Club Songs chart for one week and appeared on year-end charts, ranking 39th on the Hot 100 and fourth on the R&B/Hip-Hop chart. Internationally, "So Gone" had a limited release, peaking at number 17 in Canada and number 82 in the United Kingdom, and receiving a Gold certification from Recorded Music NZ in 2024.

Although Monica expected "Ain't Gonna Cry No More" and Don't Gotta Go Home" to be released as single at times, two other Elliott productions, "Knock Knock" and "Get It Off" were released as a dual singles in September 2003. While "Knock Knock" failed to reach the upper half of the Billboard Hot 100 and peaked at number 24 on the US Hot R&B/Hip-Hop Songs chart, remixes of "Get It Off" made it to number 13 on the Dance Club Songs chart. After the Storm's fourth and final single, "U Should've Known Better," the only single to survive the album's revamp and carried over from All Eyez on Me, also marked Monica's first ballad release in over five years and was issued in May 2004. The song peaked at number 19 on the US Billboard Hot 100 and number 6 on the Hot Hot R&B/Hip-Hop Songs, becoming the album's highest-charting single release after "So Gone".

== Critical reception ==
Professional ratings
Review scores
Source	Rating
AllMusic	4/5 stars
Chicago Sun-Times	3/4 stars
Entertainment Weekly	B−
The Guardian	3/5 stars
Los Angeles Times	2.5/4 stars
The Rolling Stone Album Guide	2.5/5 stars
The Situation	4.5/5
USA Today	3/4 stars

After the Storm received generally mixed to positive reviews from music critics. AllMusic editor Andy Kellman gave the album four out of five stars and found that it picked up where previous album The Boy Is Mine "left off with nary a speed bump. Rather than come across as if there's lost time being made up, the album has all the assuredness and smart developments that should keep Monica's younger longtime followers behind her – all the while holding the ability to appeal to a wider spectrum of R&B and hip-hop fans [...] with just the right amount of swagger added to the singer's more wide-eyed personality of the '90s." Caroline Sullivan from The Guardian commented that while "executive producer Missy Elliott is reliably ebullient on the burbling party number "Get It Off", and her enthusiasm clearly rubbed off on Monica [...] things plod a bit in the second half, though, making After the Storm more it'll-do than must-buy." Writing for The Situation, Melisa Tang, found that After the Storm "displays Monica at her best, and is her most personal work to date."

Vanessa Jones from Entertainment Weekly also called the non-Elliott-produced material mediocre, noting that "super producer Missy Elliott tarts things up with a trio of streetwise party anthems. Otherwise, in between are bland ballads and derivative midtempo tunes that often fail to match the creative heights of Monica's lush, church-trained voice. Only on a four-track bonus CD do vocals and music achieve equal footing as the singer moves beyond hackneyed beats to explore gospel, hip-hop, and quiet-storm grooves." Natalie Nichols of the Los Angeles Times also complimented Elliott's input on the album. She added that "great R&B moments have come from singers who dwell on tragedy as intensely as on overcoming. Clearly, the title After the Storm implies moving on rather than wallowing, but the album too often feels generic, despite the personal sentiments Monica lets out [...] So maybe she should've dwelt a little more, at that." The Village Voice critic Allison Stewart found that After the Storm "dissolves into a pillowy mixture of limpid ballads and self-help expositions from which it never recovers." Similarly, Jon Pareles from The New York Times concluded: "Monica is still growing into the natural richness of her voice, which is overly processed on many songs. But she's on her way to becoming a soul storyteller."

== Commercial performance ==
After the Storm became Monica's first number-one album in the United States, debuting atop the Billboard 200 with first-week sales of 185,500 copies for the week ending July 5, 2003. On the Top R&B/Hip-Hop Albums chart, the album debuted at number 84 and climbed to its peak of number 2 the following week, matching the peak of her previous and best-performing album on the chart, The Boy Is Mine. On July 17, 2003, the album was certified gold by the Recording Industry Association of America (RIAA) for domestic shipments exceeding 500,000 copies. After spending twenty-four consecutive weeks on the album chart, Billboard ranked it at number 104 on their 2003 year-end chart. The album also placed at number 36 on the magazine's Top R&B/Hip-Hop Albums year-end chart. By March 2007 After the Storm had sold 997,000 copies. By August 2010, Billboard reported that After the Storm had sold over 1,023,000 copies in the United States, according to Nielsen SoundScan. In Canada, the album peaked at number 56 on the Canadian Albums Chart, meanwhile in the United Kingdom it debuted and peaked at number 32 on the UK R&B Albums Chart.

== Track listing ==
After the Storm track listing
No.	Title	Writer(s)	Producer(s)	Length
1.	"Intro"	Missy Elliott; Craig Brockman	Elliott	1:04
2.	"Get It Off" (featuring Dirtbag)	Elliott; Herbert Jordan; Brockman; Steve Standard; Dirtbag	Elliott; DJ Scratchator^{[a]}; Brockman^{[b]}	4:19
3.	"So Gone"	Elliott; Kenneth Cunningham; Jamahl Rye; Zyah Ahmounel	Elliott; Spike & Jamahl^{[a]}	4:02
4.	"U Should've Known Better"	Arnold; Jermaine Dupri; Harold Lilly	Dupri; Bryan-Michael Cox^{[a]}	4:17
5.	"Don't Gotta Go Home" (featuring DMX)	Antoine Macon; Ryan Bowser; Earl Simmons	BAM & Ryan	3:55
6.	"Knock Knock"	Elliott; Kanye West; Lee Hatim	Elliott; West^{[a]}	4:18
7.	"Breaks My Heart"	Carsten Shack; Kenneth Karlin; Shamora Crawford	Soulshock & Karlin	4:26
8.	"I Wrote This Song"	Arnold; Shack; Karlin; Crawford; Damon Sharpe; Shuggie Otis	Soulshock & Karlin	3:48
9.	"Ain't Gonna Cry No More"	Arnold; Fred Jerkins III; LaShawn Daniels	Rodney "Darkchild" Jerkins	4:10
10.	"Go to Bed Mad" (featuring Tyrese)	Macon; Bowser; Andre "mrDEYO" Deyo	BAM & Ryan	4:37
11.	"Hurts the Most"	Shack; Peter Biker; Crawford	Soulshock & KarlinBiker	4:44
12.	"That's My Man"	Arnold; Jazze Pha; Johnta Austin	Pha	4:34
13.	"So Gone (Remix)" (featuring Busta Rhymes)	Arnold; Elliott; Cunningham; Rye; Ahmounel	Elliott; Brockman	4:20
Total length:				52:34

Japanese bonus track
No.	Title	Writer(s)	Producer(s)	Length
14.	"All Eyez on Me"	Arnold; Daniels; Quincy Jones; James Ingram	Darkchild	4:03
Total length:				56:37

Limited edition bonus disc
No.	Title	Writer(s)	Producer(s)	Length
1.	"Too Hood" (featuring Jermaine Dupri)	Arnold; Dupri; Lilly	Dupri; Cox^{[a]}	4:05
2.	"Down 4 Whatever"	Arnold; Daniels	Darkchild	4:39
3.	"What Part of the Game" (featuring Mia X)	Arnold; Mia Young; Raymond Pool Percy; Chad Butler	Jasper Da Fatso	3:08
4.	"Searchin'" (North American bonus track)	Arnold; Lilly	Cox	4:27
5.	"So Gone" (video)
Total length:				16:19

Notes

- ^{^a} signifies a co-producer
- ^{^b} signifies an additional producer
- On some physical editions of After The Storm, "So Gone (Remix)" is listed as "Outro"

Sample credits

- "Get It Off" contains a sample of Strafe's 1984 "Set It Off".
- "So Gone" contains a sample of The Whispers' 1976 "You Are Number One".
- "Knock Knock" contains a sample of The Masqueraders' 1976 "It's a Terrible Thing to Waste Your Love".
- "I Wrote This Song" contains a sample of Shuggie Otis' 1970 "Aht Uh Mi He'd".
- "All Eyez on Me" contains a sample of Michael Jackson's 1982 "P.Y.T. (Pretty Young Thing)".
- "What Part of the Game" contains a sample of Pimp C's 1996 "Break 'Em Off Somethin'".

== Personnel ==
Production and imagery

- Alexander Allen – styling
- Monica Arnold – album producer
- Leondra Crew – hair styling
- Melinda Dancil – executive album coordinator
- Clive Davis – album producer
- Missy Elliott – executive producer
- Roxanna Floyd – makeup
- Chris Lebeau – photo shoot production
- Warwick Saint – photography
- DeVyne Stephens – creative direction
- Alexis Yraola – art direction, design

Performers and musicians

- Monica Arnold – vocals, background vocals
- Montez Arnold – keyboards
- Isaac Carree – background vocals
- Shamora Crawford – background vocals
- Eric D. Jackson – guitar
- Dirtbag – vocals
- DMX – vocals
- Jermaine Dupri – vocals
- Missy Elliott – additional vocals, background vocals
- Mark Kelly – bass guitar
- Tommy Martin – guitar
- New Birth Praise Team – vocals
- Billy Odum – guitar
- Charles Pettaway – guitar
- Busta Rhymes – vocals
- R.J. Ronquillo – guitar
- Tweet – background vocals
- Tyrese – vocals, background vocals
- Mia X – vocals

Technical

- Marcella Araica – engineering assistance
- Rich Balmer – engineering
- Carlos Bedoya – engineering
- Leslie Braithwaite – mixing
- Jimmy Briggs – engineering assistance
- Ralph Cacciurri – engineering assistance
- Demacio Castellon – engineering
- Jermaine Dupri – mixing
- Brian Frye – engineering
- John Horesco IV – engineering assistance
- Scott Kieklak – mixing
- Marc Stephen Lee – engineering assistance
- Carlton Lynn – engineering, mixing
- Bill Malina – engineering
- Fabian Marasciullo – engineering, mixing
- Manny Marroquin – mixing
- Michael McCoy – engineering
- Tadd Mingo – engineering assistance
- Dexter Simmons – mixing
- Phil Tan – mixing
- Sam Thomas – engineering
- Rabeka Tuinei – engineering assistance
- Javier Valverde – engineering assistance
- Arnold Wolfe – engineering
- Chris Young – engineering assistance

== Charts ==
=== Weekly charts ===
Weekly chart performance for After the Storm
Chart (2003)	Peak position
Australian Albums (ARIA)	192
Canadian Albums (Nielsen SoundScan)	56
UK Albums (Official Charts)	136
UK R&B Albums (Official Charts)	32
US Billboard 200	1
US Top R&B/Hip-Hop Albums (Billboard)	2

=== Year-end charts ===
2003 year-end chart performance for After the Storm
Chart (2003)	Position
US Billboard 200	104
US Top R&B/Hip-Hop Albums (Billboard)	36

2004 year-end chart performance for After the Storm
Chart (2004)	Position
US Top R&B/Hip-Hop Albums (Billboard)	90

== Certifications ==
Certifications for After the Storm
Region	Certification	Certified units/sales
United States (RIAA)	Gold	1,023,000

== Release history ==
Release dates and formats for After the Storm
Region	Date	Format(s)	Label	Edition(s)	Ref
United States	June 17, 2003	CD; digital download	J Records	Standard	
Canada	June 24, 2003	CD; digital download	J Records	Standard	
Japan	June 25, 2003	CD; digital download	BMG Japan	Standard	
United Kingdom	June 30, 2003	CD; digital download	NuLife	Standard	
Europe	September 21, 2004	CD; digital download	J Records	Standard	
