= Knock Knock (Monica song) =

Single by Monica

from the album After the Storm
- Released: September 1, 2003
- Studio: The Hit Factory Criteria (Miami, Florida)
- Length: 3:41 (album version); 3:31 (radio edit)
- Label: J
- Songwriters: Missy Elliott; Lee Hatim; Kanye West
- Producers: Missy Elliott; Kanye West

Monica singles chronology
"So Gone" (2003)	"Knock Knock" (2003)	"Get It Off" (2003)

Music video
- "Knock Knock/ Get It Off" on YouTube

"Knock Knock" is a song by American R&B recording artist Monica. It was written and produced by rappers Missy Elliott and Kanye West for her fourth studio album, After the Storm (2003). Commissioned following the delay and subsequent reconstruction of Monica's third album All Eyez on Me (2002), the song is built around excerpts of the composition "It's a Terrible Thing to Waste Your Love" (1976) by American vocal group The Masqueraders. Due to the sample, Lee Hatim is also credited as a songwriter. The protagonist of "Knock Knock" warns a cheating boyfriend not to come calling.

J Records released "Knock Knock" alongside fellow Elliott production "Get It Off" as one of two singles that followed leading single "So Gone" during the third quarter of 2003. The song was lauded by critics, who praised its streetwise production and Monica's rap part on the track. A moderate success on the charts, it peaked at number 75 on the US Billboard Hot 100 and number 24 on the Hot R&B/Hip-Hop Songs chart. Its accompanying music video, directed by Chris Robinson, was filmed as a two-part story with "So Gone".

== Writing and recording ==
"Knock Knock" was written and produced by Missy Elliott for Mass Confusion Productions, with additional production by Kanye West. The song contains excerpts from the opening piano riff of The Masqueraders' "tearful" 1977 single "It's a Terrible Thing to Waste Your Love". Due to this band member and original writer Lee Hatim is also credited as a songwriter. West previously sampled the track in his own demo recording, "Apologize", which was recorded during the sessions for West's debut studio album, The College Dropout. The song was ultimately not used. "Knock Knock" was recorded by Carlos Bedoya at The Hit Factory Criteria in Miami, Florida, with further assistance from Marcella Araica. Scott Kieklak mixed the song, while mastering was overseen by Tom Coyne. Elliott also provided additional vocals. According to Rolling Stone, "Knock Knock" is a "cool and contemptuous" mid-tempo track with "steely keyboards and stony bass" that serve as "a gloating kiss-off to an inattentive partner".

The song is one out of three Elliott-produced records on After the Storm, commissioned by J Records head and executive producer Clive Davis after the release of Elliott's acclaimed studio album Under Construction (2002) and the delay of Monica's original third studio album All Eyez on Me the year before. It was conceived during a studio session week in Miami in early 2003, and was produced as a sequel to "So Gone", another Elliott track. In an interview with MTV News at the 2003 BET Awards, Monica stated that "'Knock Knock' is [...] like a follow-up to 'So Gone,' just saying that, 'All right, we went through all that stuff, now it's time for you to get lost. This is the end of the road for you.' So, it's kind of like a 'get back' record." Commenting on the recording process, she added: "She [Elliott] doesn't have any fear [...] When she goes in the studio, her goal is to be creative and to give something new and she could care less [sic] what else is current. And she creates new trends by doing that."

== Release and reception ==
"Knock Knock" received generally positive reviews from music critics. AllMusic editor Andy Kellman felt that the song, along with Elliott's other contributions on the album, provides "a bulk of the most exciting material, with just the right amount of swagger added to the singer's more wide-eyed personality of the '90s." Melisa Tang from The Situation called Monica's vocals "exceptional" and felt that she "does a pretty decent job" at emceeing on the track. Entertainment Weekly's Vanessa Jones declared "Knock Knock" a "streetwise party anthem." Elias Light from Rolling Stone named the song "the centerpiece" of parent album After the Storm and complimented West's production on the track. Billboard ranked the song among the album's highlights.

First released in the United States, "Knock Knock" debuted at number 89 on the national Billboard Hot 100 chart in the week of October 2, 2003. The fifth-highest debut of the week, it remained eighteen weeks on the chart and peaked at number 75, making it the lowest-charting single from Monica's After the Storm album. Like its predecessor "So Gone," the song was more successful on Billboard's component charts, where "Knock Knock" reached number 24 on the Hot R&B/Hip-Hop Songs chart and number 37 on the Hot R&B/Hip-Hop Airplay chart. In 2004, J Records issued the song on a remix EP along with "Get If Off".

== Music video ==
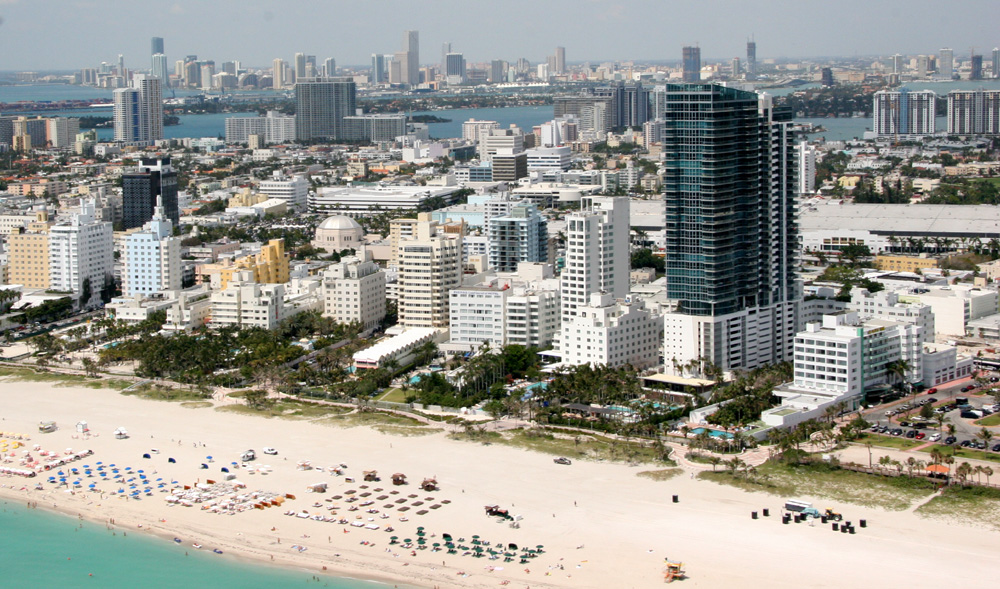
A sequel to "So Gone", the video was also filmed in the South Beach neighborhood in Miami.

A music video for "Knock Knock" was shot by director Chris Robinson, and produced by Dawn Rose for Partizan Entertainment. It was filmed in various locations throughout Miami, Florida in mid-late July 2003, and widely serves as the sequel ("Part II") to the visuals for "So Gone", the first single released from After the Storm, also directed by Robinson. The video features a second appearance by actor Derek Luke, who plays Monica's boyfriend, and intercuts a clip of simultaneously released club single "Get It Off" with a dance scene. "Knock Knock" premiered worldwide in July 2003. It charted well on several video-chart countdowns, including peak positions of number 3 on BET's 106 & Park.

== Track listings ==
CD single
No.	Title	Writer(s)	Producer(s)	Length
1.	"Knock Knock" (Radio Edit)	Melissa Elliott; Kanye West; Lee Hatim	Missy Elliott; West	3:31
2.	"Knock Knock" (Album Version)	Elliott; West; Hatim	Elliott; West	3:41
3.	"Knock Knock" (Instrumental)	Elliott; West; Hatim	Elliott; West	4:17

Dance Vault Mixes – EP
No.	Title	Writer(s)	Producer(s)	Length
1.	"Get It Off" (That Kid Chris Edit)	Craig Brockman; Elliott; Jermany James; Herbert Jordan; Steve Standard	Elliott; DJ Scratchator^{[a]}; Brockman^{[b]}; That Kid Chris^{[b]}	8:15
2.	"Get It Off" (That Kid Chris Mixshow)	Brockman; Elliott; James; Jordan; Standard	Elliott; DJ Scratchator^{[a]}; Brockman^{[b]}; That Kid Chris^{[b]}	8:37
3.	"Get It Off" (That Kid Chris Club Mix)	Brockman; Elliott; James; Jordan; Standard	Elliott; DJ Scratchator^{[a]}; Brockman^{[b]}; That Kid Chris^{[b]}	5:50
4.	"Get It Off" (That Kid Chris Dub)	Brockman; Elliott; James; Jordan; Standard	Elliott; DJ Scratchator^{[a]}; Brockman^{[b]}; That Kid Chris^{[b]}	8:56
5.	"Knock Knock" (Planet Funk Club Mix)	Elliott; West; Hatim	Elliott; West; Planet Funk^{[b]}	8:36
6.	"Knock Knock" (Planet Funk Instrumental)	Elliott; West; Hatim	Elliott; West; Planet Funk^{[b]}	4:05

Notes

- ^{^a} denotes co-producer(s)
- ^{^b} denotes additional producer(s)

Sample credits

- "Knock Knock" contains excerpts from the composition "It's a Terrible Thing to Waste Your Love" (1976) by The Masqueraders.
- "Get It Off" contains a sample from the composition "Set It Off" (1985) by Strafe.

== Credits and personnel ==
Credits adapted from the liner notes of After the Storm.

- Marcella Araica – audio engineering
- Monica Arnold – lead vocals, background vocals
- Carlos Bedoya – recording
- Tom Coyne – mastering
- Missy Elliott – production, additional vocals, writer
- Lee Hatim – writer
- Scott Kieklak – mixing
- Kanye West – production, writer

== Charts ==
Weekly chart performance for "Knock Knock"
Chart (2003)	Peak position
US Billboard Hot 100	75
US Hot R&B/Hip-Hop Songs (Billboard)	24

== Release history ==
Release dates and formats for "Knock Knock"
Region	Date	Format(s)	Label(s)	Ref.
United States	September 1, 2003	CD single	J Records	
