= Get It Off =

Single by Monica featuring Dirtbag

from the album After the Storm
- A-side: "Knock Knock"
- Released: September 2003
- Recorded: 2003
- Studio: Hit Factory Criteria (Miami)
- Length: 4:19
- Label: J
- Songwriters: Craig Brockman; Missy Elliott; Dirtbag; Herbert Jordan; Steve Standard
- Producers: Missy Elliott; DJ Scratchator

Monica singles chronology
"Knock Knock" (2003)	"Get It Off" (2003)	"U Should've Known Better" (2004)

Music video
- "Knock Knock/ Get It Off" on YouTube

"Get It Off" is a song by American recording artist Monica. It was written by rapper Missy Elliott, Craig Brockman, and Herbert Jordan, and produced by the former along with DJ Scratchator and Brockman for Monica's fourth studio album, After the Storm (2003). The song is built around a sample of "Set It Off" (1984) by American electro and old school hip hop group Strafe. Due to the inclusion of the sample, Steve Standard is also credited as a songwriter. The uptempo also features guest vocals by rapper Dirtbag.

The song was released as the album's second single on a double A-side single with "Knock Knock", also produced by Elliott. While "Get It Off" failed to chart within the US Billboard Hot 100, its That Kid Chris Remix, produced by Chris Staropoli, peaked at number 13 on the component Dance Club Songs chart. A portion of "Get It Off" was incorporated as a dance break into the music video for "Knock Knock", filmed by director Chris Robinson in Miami, Florida on in mid-late July 2003.

== Track listings ==
Dance Vault Mixes – EP
No.	Title	Writer(s)	Producer(s)	Length
1.	"Get It Off" (That Kid Chris Edit)	Craig Brockman; Elliott; Jermany James; Herbert Jordan; Steve Standard	Elliott; DJ Scratchator^{[a]}; Brockman^{[b]}; That Kid Chris^{[b]}	8:15
2.	"Get It Off" (That Kid Chris Mixshow)	Brockman; Elliott; James; Jordan; Standard	Elliott; DJ Scratchator^{[a]}; Brockman^{[b]}; That Kid Chris^{[b]}	8:37
3.	"Get It Off" (That Kid Chris Club Mix)	Brockman; Elliott; James; Jordan; Standard	Elliott; DJ Scratchator^{[a]}; Brockman^{[b]}; That Kid Chris^{[b]}	5:50
4.	"Get It Off" (That Kid Chris Dub)	Brockman; Elliott; James; Jordan; Standard	Elliott; DJ Scratchator^{[a]}; Brockman^{[b]}; That Kid Chris^{[b]}	8:56
5.	"Knock Knock" (Planet Funk Club Mix)	Elliott; West; Hatim	Elliott; West; Planet Funk^{[b]}	8:36
6.	"Knock Knock" (Planet Funk Instrumental)	Elliott; West; Hatim	Elliott; West; Planet Funk^{[b]}	4:05

Notes

- ^{^a} denotes co-producer(s)
- ^{^b} denotes additional producer(s)

Sample credits

- "Get It Off" contains a sample from the composition "Set It Off" (1985) by Strafe.
- "Knock Knock" contains excerpts from the composition "It's a Terrible Thing to Waste Your Love" (1976) by The Masqueraders.

== Credits and personnel ==
Credits adapted from the liner notes of After the Storm.

- Marcella Araica – audio engineering
- Monica Arnold – lead vocals, background vocals
- Carlos Bedoya – recording
- Tom Coyne – mastering
- Missy Elliott – production, additional vocals
- Scott Kieklak – mixing

== Charts ==
Chart (2003)	Peak position
US Dance Club Songs (Billboard) That Kid Chris remix	13
US Rhythmic Airplay (Billboard)	31
