= All Eyez on Me (disambiguation) =

All Eyez on Me is a 1996 double album by 2Pac.

All Eyez on Me may also refer to:

- "All Eyez On Me" (Tupac Shakur song), the 2Pac album's title track featuring Big Syke
- All Eyez on Me (Monica album), 2002 studio album by Monica
  - "All Eyez on Me" (Monica song), the Monica album's title track
- All Eyez on Me (film), 2017 biographical drama film about rapper Tupac Shakur

== See also ==
- All Eyez on Us (album), a 2008 album by Lil' Flip and Young Noble
- All Eyes on Me (disambiguation)
