= So Gone =

Single by Monica

from the album After the Storm
- Released: March 31, 2003
- Studio: Hit Factory Criteria (Miami)
- Length: 4:02
- Label: J
- Songwriters: Melissa Elliott; Zyah Ahmonuel; Kenneth Cunningham; Jamahl Rye
- Producer: Missy Elliott

Monica singles chronology
"Too Hood" (2002)	"So Gone" (2003)	"Knock Knock" (2003)

Music video
- "So Gone" on YouTube

"So Gone" is a song by American R&B recording artist Monica. It was one out of several tracks rapper-producer Missy Elliott wrote and produced along with Kenneth Cunningham and Jamahl Rye from production duo Spike & Jamahl for Monica's fourth studio album, After the Storm (2003), following the delay and subsequent reconstruction of her 2002 album, All Eyez on Me. Incorporating elements of hip hop and 1970s-style smooth jazz as well as soul music, it features a sample from the 1976 song "You Are Number One", penned by Zyah Ahmonuel and performed by The Whispers.

Following the less successful chart performances of previous singles "All Eyez on Me" and "Too Hood", J Records released the song on March 31, 2003, as the lead single from After the Storm in the United States. The song was lauded by critics, who praised its vintage touches and sparse hip hop influences. "So Gone" became Monica's biggest commercial success in years, reaching number 10 on the US Billboard Hot 100 and the top of both the Hot R&B/Hip-Hop Singles & Tracks and Hot Dance Club Play charts, becoming her first chart topper since 1999's "Angel of Mine".

The song's music video, directed by Chris Robinson and shot at Miami's South Beach in April 2003, features Monica as one half of a dysfunctional relationship in which she prejudges her man to cheat on her. It ends on a cliffhanger, which leads to the video for the album's second single, "Knock Knock". Nominated for a Soul Train Music Award for Best R&B/Soul Single and a Teen Choice Awards, Monica performed the song on several televised events, including 106 & Park, The Today Show, The Tonight Show with Jay Leno and MTV's Total Request Live.

== Background and recording ==
"So Gone" was written and produced by rapper Missy Elliott along with Kenneth Cunningham and Jamahl Rye from duo Spike & Jamahl. Recorded by Demacio Castellon at Hit Factory Criteria in Miami, Florida, the song was mixed by Scott Kieklak, while Marcella Araica and Javier Valeverde both assisted in the audio engineering of "So Gone". Backing vocals for the track were recorded by Monica, with additional vocals provided by fellow R&B singer Tweet. Built around a prominent sample from the 1976 song "You Are Number One", originally performed by American vocal group The Whispers, writer Zyah Ahmonuel holds partial songwriter credits on the song.

The record is one out of three Elliott-produced additions to the partially re-worked After the Storm album, commissioned by J Records head and executive producer Clive Davis after Elliott's 2002 success with her fourth studio album, Under Construction, and the delay of Monica's original third studio album, All Eyez On Me, the year before. It was conceived during a studio session week in the Goldmind recordings studios in Miami in early 2003, with most of it being "done in probably three or four hours." Speaking about its sound, Monica said in an interview with MTV News: "'So Gone' takes you back to when people first heard me. It's got that feeling like no holds barred, not trying to cater to any one audience." Initially recorded for the US re-release of All Eyez on Me, it was later featured on the re-tooled After the Storm album only.

Lyrically, "So Gone" describes and chronicles lovesickness towards an unfaithful romantic partner. "The song is saying that I'm so gone that I'm not thinking straight," Monica told Jet Magazine. "I do that sometimes because I'm pretty hard. She [Missy Elliott] may have taken some of the real life from me and put it into song." Elliott proposed the singer to start rapping over the record — a venture, that would become "second nature" to her: "Missy kept telling me that I act like a rapper so she encouraged me to rap on 'So Gone' and 'Knock Knock'. She would put together rhythms." Elliott protégé, singer Tweet, and frequent collaborator, rapper Busta Rhymes, joined the recording sessions to provide vocals for a remix version of the song, which was later also included as "Outro" on After the Storm.

== Critical reception ==
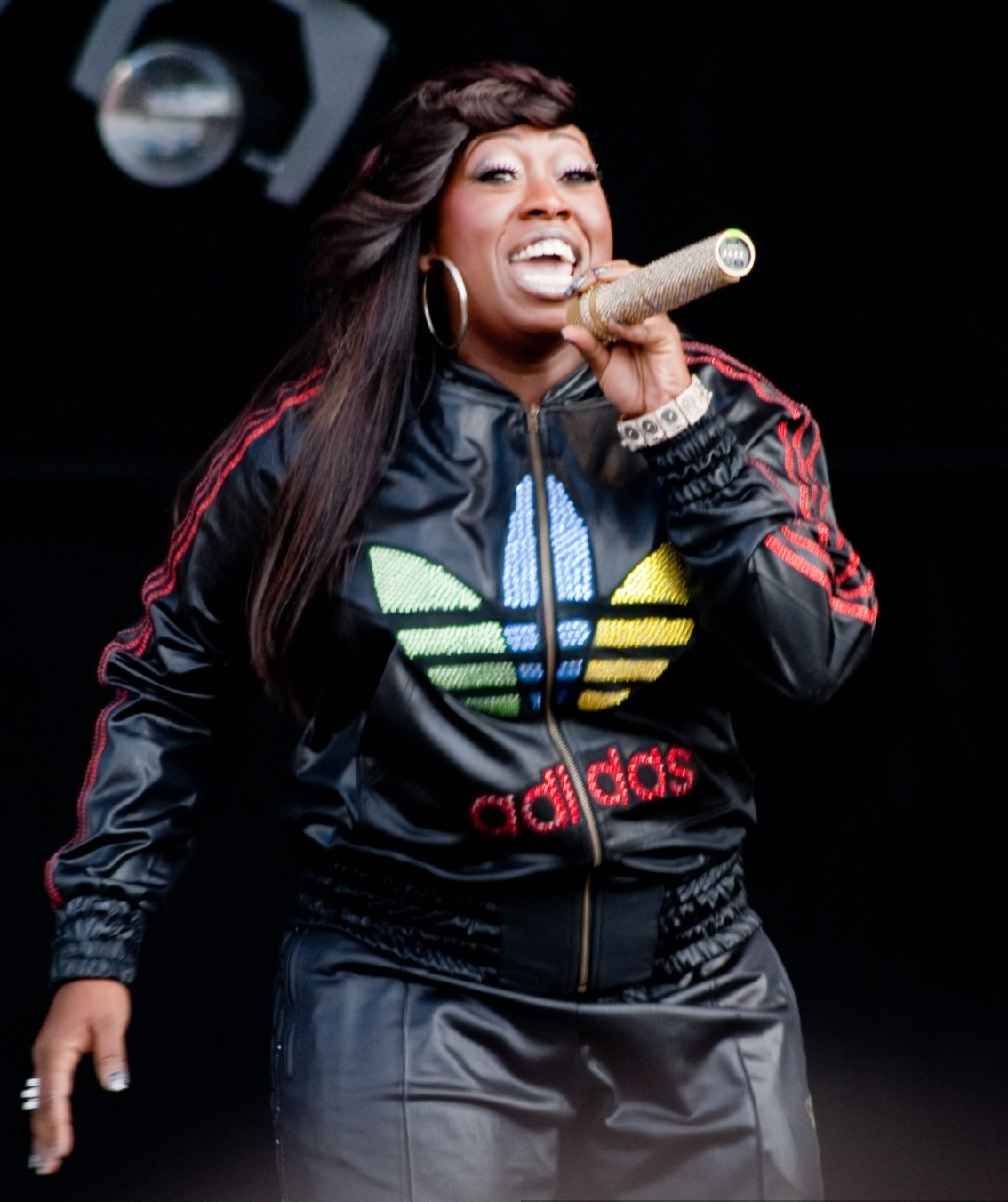
Rapper Missy Elliott earned favorable reviews for her production on "So Gone."

"So Gone" received generally positive reviews from contemporary music critics, many of whom praised its retro-inspired sound. Lewis Dene of BBC Music described the track as an "infectious ’70s soul groove," while Chuck Arnold of People wrote that "So Gone" was one of three standout tracks on parent album After the Storm. He noted that the use of The Whispers' 1977 single "You Are Number One," was resulting in a retro-soul atmosphere reminiscent of Aretha Franklin's 1972 hit "Day Dreaming." In his review of After the Storm, AllMusic editor Andy Kellman wrote that "So Gone," along with Elliott's other productions such as "Get It Off" and "Knock Knock," constituted the album's most exciting material, praising the tracks for adding "just the right amount of swagger" to Monica's more wide-eyed 1990s persona.

Writing for the Los Angeles Times, Natalie Nichols observed that the song depicts "the obsessive love call of an unrequited female suitor" and is driven by a hip hop–influenced beat from Elliott, complemented by "funky-to-humorous old-school touches," including horns and vinyl surface noise. Chuck Taylor of Billboard described the song's "sparse, hip-hop-influenced" production and "vintage touches" as "instantly infectious." He further commented that Monica's familiar "around-the-way-girl" persona was "on full display," adding that "So Gone" could help the singer maintain her relevance. Similarly, Jon Pareles from The New York Times wrote that "So Gone," with "a sparse backdrop of static and sampled strings and horns, has the singer missing her ex so much that she stalks him." The Washington Post described the song as "a jilted lover's fulmination abetted by the platinum production touch of Missy Elliott," but judged it inferior to its "Outro" remix.

== Commercial performance ==
"So Gone" was one of Monica's most commercially successful singles in several years. The song debuted at number 66 on the US Billboard Hot 100 and peaked at number 10, becoming her eighth top-ten entry on the chart. Its comparatively strong performance contrasted with that of many of her singles released between 1999 and 2003, several of which failed to chart on the Hot 100 or its Bubbling Under extension. "So Gone" also marked Monica’s tenth top-ten hit on the US domestic charts overall and her first top-ten single since "Angel of Mine" in early 1999. The track remained in the Hot 100's top forty for twenty weeks and was ranked number 39 on the chart's 2003 year-end list.

The song also spent five consecutive weeks at number one on Billboard's component Hot R&B/Hip-Hop Singles & Tracks chart, becoming Monica's first chart topper since 1998's "The First Night" and sixth number-one hit in total. It was ranked fourth on the Hot R&B/Hip-Hop Singles 2003 year-end chart behind 50 Cent's "In da Club", R. Kelly's "Ignition (Remix)" and Aaliyah's "Miss You". The "Scum frog Club Mix" of the song also spent one week on top of the Hot Dance Club Play chart. Outside North America, "So Gone" received only a limited 12-inch vinyl release, which contributed to its modest performance in international markets. The song peaked at number 17 on the Canadian Singles Chart and reached number 82 on the UK Singles Chart. In 2024, it earned a Gold certification from Recorded Music NZ (RMNZ).

== Music video ==
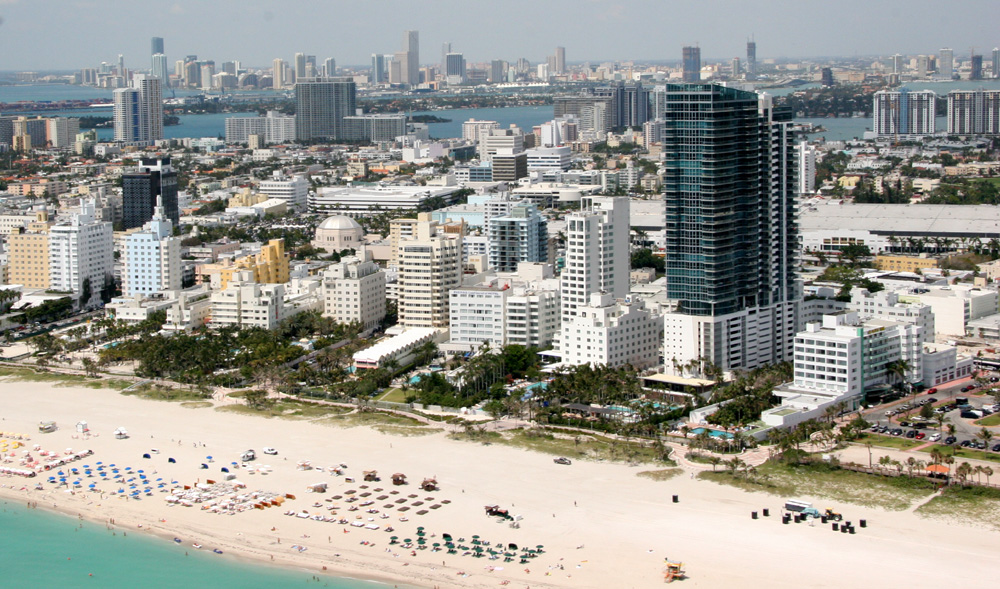
The music video for "So Gone" was filmed in various locations throughout the South Beach neighborhood in Miami.

The music video for "So Gone" was directed by Chris Robinson and produced by Dawn Rose for Partizan Entertainment. The cinematography was handled by Jo Willems, and the costume design was created by Alexander Allen. Filming took place on April 1 and 2, 2003, with many interior scenes shot at the same Key Biscayne, Florida mansion used in the 1983 film Scarface, as well as at various locations throughout the South Beach area of Miami, Florida. Actor Derek Luke co-stars as Monica’s love interest, while producer Missy Elliott makes a cameo in several scenes.

The video’s narrative portrays Monica as a distraught girlfriend who believes she has uncovered her partner’s hidden secret. "The video is like [Luke] and I are in a relationship," Monica explained in an interview with MTV News. "In my mind I think he’s cheating. As you see in the video, my mind’s playing tricks on me. I’ve destroyed his home and all this stuff for no reason. I get arrested, as you would in real life." The video concludes with Monica being taken away in a police cruiser, creating a cliffhanger that leads directly into the video for the album’s second single, "Knock Knock."

The "So Gone" video premiered worldwide on April 23, 2003, during the closing segment of BET's television series Access Granted. It performed strongly on music video countdowns, peaking at number two on BET's 106 & Park and at number six on MTV's Total Request Live.

== Track listings ==
Maxi-CD single
No.	Title	Writer(s)	Producer(s)	Length
1.	"So Gone" (Radio Edit)	Melissa Elliott; Zyah Ahmonuel; Kenneth Cunningham; Jamahl Rye	Missy Elliott; Spike & Jamahl^{[a]}	3:26
2.	"So Gone" (Album Version)	Elliott; Ahmonuel; Cunningham; Rye	Elliott; Spike & Jamahl^{[a]}	4:02
3.	"So Gone" (Remix featuring Busta Rhymes)	Elliott; Ahmonuel; Cunningham; Rye; Trevor Smith, Jr.; William Allen; Roy Ayers; Edwin Birdsong; Walter Booker; Kamaal Fareed; Ali Shaheed Muhammad; Charles Stepney	Elliott; Spike & Jamahl^{[a]}	4:46
4.	"So Gone" (Scumfrog Remix, Part II)	Elliott; Ahmonuel; Cunningham; Rye	Elliott; Spike & Jamahl^{[a]}; The Scumfrog^{[b]}	3:40
5.	"U Should've Known Better"	Monica Arnold; Jermaine Dupri; Harold Lilly	Dupri; Bryan Michael Cox^{[a]}	4:17

US CD single II
No.	Title	Writer(s)	Producer(s)	Length
1.	"So Gone" (Radio Mix)	Elliott; Ahmonuel; Cunningham; Rye	Elliott; Spike & Jamahl^{[a]}	3:26
2.	"All Eyez on Me" (Radio Edit – Urban Mix)	Arnold; Rodney Jerkins; LaShawn Daniels	Jerkins; Daniels^{[c]}	3:58

Notes

- ^{^a} denotes co-producer(s)
- ^{^b} denotes additional producer(s)
- ^{^c} denotes vocal producer(s)

Sample credits

- "So Gone (Album Version)" contains excerpts from the composition "You Are Number One" (1976) by The Whispers.
- "So Gone (Remix)" contains samples from "Violation" (1978) by Saint Tropez and "Bonita Applebum" (1990) by A Tribe Called Quest.
- "All Eyez on Me" contains excerpts from the composition "P.Y.T. (Pretty Young Thing)" (1982) by Michael Jackson.

== Credits and personnel ==
Credits adapted from the liner notes of After the Storm.

- Monica Arnold – lead vocals, background vocals
- Marcella Araica – audio engineering
- Demacio Castellon – recording
- Tom Coyne – mastering
- Kenneth Cunningham – co-producer, writer
- Missy Elliott – production
- Scott Kieklak – mixing
- Jamahl Rye – co-producer, writer
- Tweet – additional vocals
- Javier Valeverde – audio engineering

== Charts ==
=== Weekly charts ===
Weekly chart performance for "So Gone"
Chart (2003)	Peak position
Australia (ARIA)	72
Australian Urban (ARIA)	20
Canada (Nielsen SoundScan)	17
UK Singles (Official Charts)	82
UK Hip Hop/R&B (Official Charts)	12
US Billboard Hot 100	10
US Dance Club Songs (Billboard) Scumfrog mixes	1
US Hot R&B/Hip-Hop Songs (Billboard)	1
US Rhythmic Airplay (Billboard)	15

=== Year-end charts ===
Year-end chart performance for "So Gone"
Chart (2003)	Position
UK Urban (Music Week)	15
US Billboard Hot 100	39
US Dance Club Play (Billboard)	11
US Hot R&B/Hip-Hop Singles & Tracks (Billboard)	4
US Rhythmic Top 40 (Billboard)	75

== Certifications ==
Certifications for "So Gone"
Region	Certification	Certified units/sales
New Zealand (RMNZ)	Gold	15,000^{‡}
^{‡} Sales+streaming figures based on certification alone.

== Release history ==
Release dates and formats for "So Gone"
Region	Date	Format(s)	Label(s)	Ref(s).
United States	March 31, 2003	Rhythmic contemporary; urban radio	J	
Australia	August 18, 2003	CD	J	

== See also ==
- List of number-one dance singles of 2003 (U.S.)
- List of number-one R&B singles of 2003 (U.S.)
