= Ryan Bowser =

American record producer

- Birth name: Ryan Bowser
- Origin: St. Louis, Missouri, U.S.
- Genres: Hip-hop; R&B; pop
- Occupation: Record producer
- Years active: 1995–present

Ryan Bowser is an American record producer from St. Louis, Missouri. He is known for his work with R&B and soul artists.

== Information ==
Bowser began producing and working with local artists including Nelly, City Spud, and the St. Lunatics in the late 1990s. His vocals can still be heard singing background on their Free City album Groovin' Tonight, featuring Brian McKnight. Bowser joined forces with longtime friend Antoine "Bam" Macon to form the production duo The Nimrods in early 2000. Bowser's first noted major placement was Arista Recording artist, Toya Rodriguez, professionally known as Toya in 2001. He produced over 50 percent of the album including her most popular hit "I DO!" The single and debut album Toya, sold approximately 400,000 copies. In 2001, Bowser's remake of Patti LaBelle's "Love Need and Want You" featured as "Dilemma" on Nelly's album, Nellyville featuring Kelly Rowland from Destiny's Child. The single landed at #1 on the Billboard Hot R&B/Hip Hop Singles & Tracks, Hot Rap Tracks and on the Billboard Hot 100 as the first rap song to hold the #1 spot for 12 consecutive weeks earning a Grammy Award for Best R&B & Rap Collaboration. "Dilemma" now sits at #64 on Billboard's Greatest Songs Of All Time and is the most successful song of Nelly's career, giving him his first number-one single in many countries, such as Australia, Belgium, Germany, Ireland, The Netherlands, Switzerland, United Kingdom and the United States. "Dilemma" was nominated twice for Best Music Video at the 2003 Soul Train Music Awards and MTV Music Video Awards.

In 2005 he split from the Nimrods and he began branding himself as Ghost Music. Bowser was signed to EMI Music Publishing by John "Big Jon" Platt. In 2014, Bowser produced two singles for Sony UK pop group Moorhouse, as well as new rap artist Eric Martinez's single "Seasons" featured on his recent project Inspired By 92. Bowser went on to open 2015 producing a single for Columbia Records female rap artist Dej Loaf titled "Me U & Hennessy" featuring Lil Wayne along with her producer DDS.

Ryan's success led him to producing for other notable acts MOORHOUSE, Monica, 112, Mario, J-Kwon, Rubben Studdard, Trina, Paul Wall, Ma$e, Pretty Ricky, Tabiyus, DMX and Q Da Kid, including chart hitting singles like Take It Slow (O'Ryan), My Baby (Bow Wow feat. Jagged Edge), Ball Out/500 1's (Blak Jak feat T-Pain), and scoring his first movie "4 Minutes".

== Discography ==
- Toya 2001
- "Dilemma" 2002
- Nellyville 2002
- Simply Deep 2002
- After the Storm 2003
- "Me U & Hennessy" 2015
