= Down to Earth (soundtrack) =

Down to Earth: Music from the Motion Picture

Soundtrack album by Various artists
- Released: February 13, 2001
- Recorded: 2000–01
- Genre: Hip hop; R&B
- Length: 58:31
- Label: Sony Music Soundtrax
- Producer: Bill Stephney (exec.); Ken Komisar (exec.); Ken Kushnick (exec.); Matt Walden (exec.); Beyoncé; Bryan-Michael Cox; Cory Rooney; Damon Elliott; Darren Vegas; Dr. Dre; Eddie Berkeley; Falonte Moore; KayGee; Kevin "She'kspere" Briggs; Kowan Paul; Lauryn Hill; Lewis A. Martineé; Rob Fusari; Ric Wake; Scott Storch; Tricky Stewart; Troy Oliver; Vidal Davis

Singles from Down to Earth
- 1. "Just Another Girl" Released: January 1, 2001; 2. "Someone to Love You" Released: February 11, 2002

Professional ratings
Review scores
Source	Rating
AllMusic	4/5 stars

Down to Earth: Music From the Motion Picture is the soundtrack to Paul and Chris Weitz's 2001 film Down to Earth. It was released on February 13, 2001 through Epic/Sony Music Soundtrax. It consisted of a blend of hip hop and contemporary R&B music. The soundtrack was a minor success, peaking at #71 on the Billboard 200 and #34 on the Top R&B/Hip-Hop Albums, and spawned two promotional singles: Ruff Endz's "Someone to Love You" which peaked at #49 on the Billboard Hot 100 and Monica's "Just Another Girl" which peaked at #64 on the same chart.

== Track listing ==
No.	Title	Writer(s)	Producer(s)	Length
1.	"Glitches" (performed by The Roots & Amel Larrieux)	Ahmir Thompson; Tariq Trotter; Amel Larrieux; Laru Larrieux; Scott Storch	Scott Storch	4:05
2.	"Just Another Girl" (performed by Monica)	Damon Sharpe; Lindy Robbins; Carsten Lindberg; Joachim Svare	Ric Wake; Great Dane Productions (add.); Richie Jones (add.)	3:23
3.	"Can You Tell It's Me" (performed by Ginuwine)	Kowan Paul; Marcus Clinkscale	Kowan "Q" Paul	4:00
4.	"What If I Was White" (performed by Sticky Fingaz featuring Eminem)	Sticky Fingaz; Damon Elliott	Damon Elliott	3:37
5.	"Never Let Go" (performed by 3LW)	Kevin "She'kspere" Briggs; Kandi Burruss	She'kspere	3:45
6.	"Someone to Love You" (performed by Ruff Endz)	Cory Rooney	Cory Rooney; Troy Oliver	5:35
7.	"Gin and Juice" (performed by Snoop Doggy Dogg)	Cordozar Broadus; Andre Young	Dr. Dre	3:41
8.	"With You" (performed by Son by Four)	Ángel López	Lewis A. Martineé	4:20
9.	"I Think I Like You" (performed by Jordan Brown)	Christopher A. Stewart; Thabiso Nkhereanye; Traci Hale	Christopher "Tricky" Stewart	3:22
10.	"Up Against the Wall" (performed by Layzie Bone)	Steven Howse; Darren Hubbard	Darren Vegas	3:46
11.	"Dreamed You" (performed by Jagged Edge)	Bryan-Michael Cox; Brian Casey; Brandon Casey	Bryan-Michael Cox	3:50
12.	"One Time" (performed by Jill Scott featuring Eric Roberson)	Jill Scott; Vidal Davis; Eric Roberson	Vidal Davis	3:59
13.	"Angel" (performed by Kelly Rowland)	Beyoncé Knowles; Falonte Moore; Rob Fusari	Beyoncé Knowles; Falonte Moore; Rob Fusari	3:36
14.	"Thug Music Play On" (performed by Bone Thugs-n-Harmony)	Bone; James Harris III; Terry Lewis; Lionel Richie	KayGee; Eddie Berkeley; Damizza (co.)	3:35
15.	"Everything Is Everything" (performed by Lauryn Hill)	Lauryn Hill; Johari Newton (add.)	Lauryn Hill	3:57
Total length:				58:31

Sample credits

- "Thug Music Play On" contains interpolations from "Human" (James Harris III, Terry Lewis) and "All Night Long" (Lionel Richie).

== Charts ==
Chart (2001)	Peak position
US Billboard 200	71
US Top R&B/Hip-Hop Albums (Billboard)	34
