= Eyes on Me =

Eyes on Me can refer to several musical works:

- "Eyes on Me" (Celine Dion song)
- "Eyes on Me" (Faye Wong song)
- "Eyes on Me" (Superfly song)
- "Eyes on Me" (Yu Yamada song)
- "Eyes on Me", a song by Misia from Mars & Roses
- "Eyes on Me" (Iz*One Concert Series)

== See also ==
- All Eyes on Me (disambiguation)
