= Too Hood =

Single by Monica featuring Jermaine Dupri

from the album All Eyez on Me
- Released: September 23, 2002
- Recorded: 2001; SouthSide Studios (Atlanta, Georgia)
- Length: 3:55 (album version)
- Label: J
- Songwriters: Monica Arnold; Jermaine Mauldin; Bryan-Michael Cox; Harold Lilly
- Producer: Jermaine Dupri

Monica singles chronology
"All Eyez on Me" (2002)	"Too Hood" (2002)	"So Gone" (2003)

Jermaine Dupri singles chronology
"Basketball" (2002)	"Too Hood" (2002)	"Pop That Booty" (2002)

"Too Hood" is a song by American singer Monica. It was written by Monica along with Bryan-Michael Cox, Harold Lilly, and Jermaine Dupri for her original third studio album, All Eyez on Me (2002), featuring production by the latter and additional production by Cox. The song was released as the album's second single in the United States during the third quarter of 2002. It reached minor success with a peak position of number 11 on the official US Bubbling Under R&B/Hip-Hop Singles.

In September 2002, the single followed the mediocre chart success of the album's title song, "All Eyez on Me." Unlike its predecessor, however, the track saw minimal success on the charts, and thus a music video was never produced. The lukewarm response to both singles eventually resulted in the reconstruction of the same-titled album, which received a Japan-wide release only and was subsequently retooled into a new version. Branded After the Storm (2003), "Too Hood" was later included on a limited bonus disc on the re-worked album. The track is also featured on EA Sports's video game NBA Live 2003.

== Background ==
"Too Hood" was written by Monica, Bryan-Michael Cox, Harold Lilly, and Jermaine Dupri, while production was overseen by the latter. Cox is credited as co-producer on the track. Monica has described the song as "a lighthearted way of explaining where I’m from. I really like that song."

== Track listing ==
All tracks written by Monica Arnold, Bryan Michael Cox, Jermaine Dupri, and Harold Lilly, and produced by Dupri, with co-production by Cox.

CD single
No.	Title	Length
1.	"Too Hood" (Radio Edit featuring Jermaine Dupri)	3:55
2.	"Too Hood" (Radio Edit without rap)	3:23
3.	"Too Hood" (Instrumental)	3:55

== Credits and personnel ==
Credits lifted from the liner notes of All Eyez on Me.

- Monica Arnold – lead vocals, writer
- Bryan Michael Cox – co-producer, writer
- Tony Dawsey – mastering
- Jermaine Dupri – mixing, producer, vocals, writer
- Brian Frye – recording
- Harold Lilly – writer
- Phil Tan – mixing

== Charts ==
Chart performance for "Too Hood"
Chart (2002)	Peak position
US Hot R&B/Hip-Hop Singles Sales (Billboard)	61
