= Just Another Girl (Monica song) =

2001 single by Monica

Single by Monica

from the album Down to Earth and All Eyez on Me (bonus track)
- Released: January 16, 2001
- Recorded: 2000
- Length: 3:24
- Label: Epic; Sony Music Soundtrax
- Songwriters: Carsten Lindberg; Lindy Robbins; Damon Sharpe; Joachim Svare
- Producer: Ric Wake

Monica singles chronology
"I've Got to Have It" (2000)	"Just Another Girl" (2001)	"All Eyez on Me" (2002)

Music video
- "Just Another Girl" on YouTube

"Just Another Girl" is a song by American recording artist Monica. It was written by Carsten Lindberg, Lindy Robbins, Damon Sharpe, and Joachim Svare with production by Ric Wake from W&R Group and additional contribution by Richard "Richie" Jones and Great Dane Productions. Originally intended for Monica's third studio album All Eyez on Me (2002), it was eventually recorded for the soundtrack of the 2001 motion picture comedy Down to Earth after a different song by producer Kevin "She'kspere" Briggs was rejected as the film's title tack by Sony Music.

An uptempo song, "Just Another Girl" finds the female protagonist expressing her doubt on her man's fidelity. Released to positive reviews by contemporary music critics, who called it "sassy [and] crackling", the song was released as the soundtrack's only single in the United States, where it became a moderate commercial success, peaking at number 64 on the US Billboard Hot 100 and number 34 on the component Hot R&B/Hip-Hop Singles & Tracks chart. An accompanying music video was filmed with director Dave Meyers in January 2001.

== Background and recording ==
"Just Another Girl" was written by Carsten Lindberg, Lindy Robbins, Damon Sharpe, and Joachim Svare, while production was handled by English producer Ric Wake from W&R Group, with additional production by Richard "Richie" Jones and Great Dane Productions. It was recorded by Dave Scheuer at The Dream Factory in New York City, Cove City Sound Studios in Long Island, New York, and Doppler Studios in Atlanta, Georgia. Dan Hetzel mixed with further assistance from Jim Annunziato. Arrangements were handled by Great Dane Productions and Wake, while keyboards and programming was led by Lindberg, Svare, and Jones. Additional keyboard contribution came from Eric Kupper.

Originally crafted for Monica's then untitled third studio album, All Eyez on Me (2002), the song was not expected to be used for the soundtrack of Chris and Paul Weitz's 2001 comedy film Down to Earth, starring comedian Chris Rock. Instead, Monica recorded a different title track with producer Kevin "She'kspere" Briggs that Sony Music decided not to use however, prompting her to enter recording sessions with Ric Wake. During an interview, she said, "Everybody loved the record, but it was being held for my album. So there were some issues about getting the song, and once we did, we actually worked through the Christmas holidays recording it." While Monica remarked, that "Just Another Girl" was not "pertaining to the stage in [her] life [she was] in" as she was waiting and looking different material to be recorded for her album, the record was later included as a bonus track on the All Eyez on Me album.

== Reception ==
Jason Birchmeier of Allmusic described the song as being "successive," while Elysa Gardner from Vibe magazine wrote that "Monica's sassy, crackling "Just Another Girl" is a winner."

== Music video ==
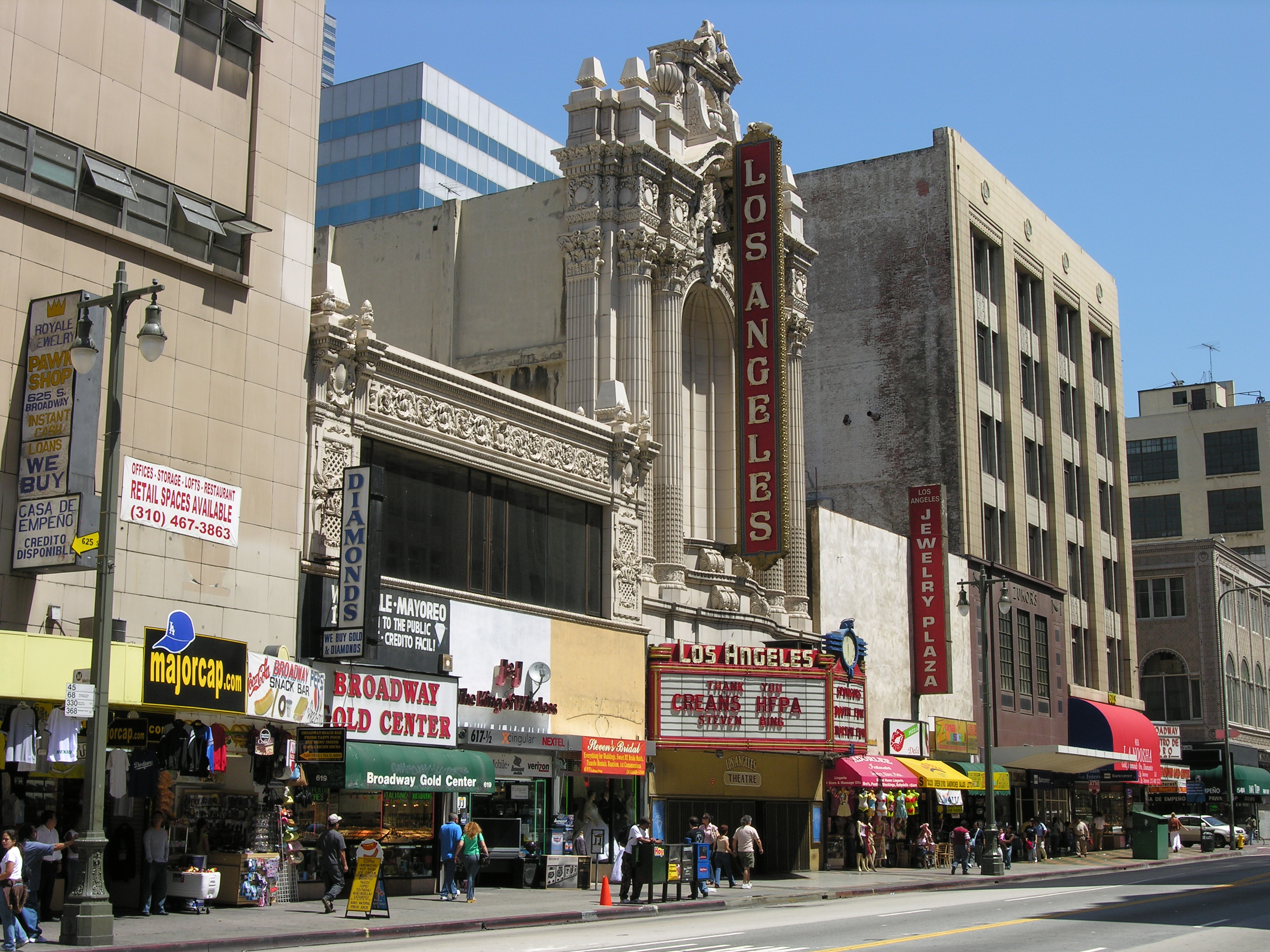
The music video for "Just Another Girl" was filmed at the Los Angeles Theatre (pictured).

A music video for "Just Another Girl" was directed by Dave Meyers and filmed inside the Los Angeles Theatre in the historic Broadway Theater District in Downtown Los Angeles on January 2, 2001. Speaking of the shoot, Monica noted in an interview with MTV News that the team "had our ups and downs as far as the video shoot was concerned, because coming out of the holidays, people weren't really in work mode." In addition, a water main broke while filming and black smut covered most of the set.

The video starts out with features clips from the movie while Monica performs dancing in the background. Monica comes out to make a performance, appears on stage and later so to a downstairs club get together catching a guy's eye. The video ends with a dance scene. Stylistically, the visuals marked a departure from previous music videos: "I was really excited about being able to look different and come with different imaging, because I think I've grown a lot as a person," Monica stated, "I did moves that were comfortable for me." "Just Another Girl" became BET's most-played clip in the week of March 3, 2001.

== Personnel ==
Personnel are taken from the Down to Earth liner notes.

- Jim Annunziato – assistant engineering
- Great Dane Productions – additional production, arrangement
- Dan Hetzel – mix engineering
- Richard "Richie" Jones – additional production, keyboards, programming
- Eric Kupper – additional keysboards
- Carsten Lindberg – keyboards, programming, writing
- Lindy Robbins – writing
- Marc Russell – production coordination
- "Young" Dave Scheuer – recording engineering
- Damon Sharpe – keyboards, programming, writing
- Joachim Svare – writing
- Ric Wake – arrangement, production

== Charts ==
=== Weekly charts ===
Weekly chart performance for "Just Another Girl"
Chart (2001)	Peak position
US Billboard Hot 100	64
US Hot R&B/Hip-Hop Songs (Billboard)	34
US Rhythmic Airplay (Billboard)	14

=== Year-end charts ===
Year-end chart performance for "Just Another Girl"
Chart (2001)	Position
US Rhythmic Top 40 (Billboard)	59
