= All Eyes on Me =

All Eyes on Me may refer to:

- "All Eyes on Me" (AKA song), 2014 single by South African rapper AKA
- "All Eyes on Me" (Bo Burnham song), 2021
- "All Eyes on Me" (Jisoo song), 2023 single by Jisoo
- "All Eyes on Me", 2022 song from the album Alpha Zulu by Phoenix
- "All Eyes on Me", 1998 song from the album Dizzy Up the Girl by the Goo Goo Dolls
- "All Eyes on Me", 2006 song from the album LeToya by LeToya Luckett, featuring Paul Wall
- "All Eyes on Me", 2007 song from the album Food by Zico Chain
- "All Eyes on Me", 2009 song from the album Til the Casket Drops by Clipse, featuring Keri Hilson
- All Eyes on Me, 2018 extended play release by Conro

== See also ==
- "All Eyes on You", a 2015 song by Meek Mill from the album Dreams Worth More Than Money
- "All Eyes on You", a 1982 song by Peter Frampton from the album Premonition (Peter Frampton album)
- All Eyez on Me (disambiguation)
- Eyes on Me (disambiguation)
