= I've Got to Have It =

2000 single by Jermaine Dupri and Nas featuring Monica

Single by Jermaine Dupri and Nas featuring Monica

from the album Big Momma's House (soundtrack)
- Released: May 2, 2000
- Length: 3:20
- Label: So So Def; Columbia
- Songwriters: Jermaine Mauldin; Nasir Jones; Monica Arnold; Bryan-Michael Cox; Peter Gabriel
- Producer: Jermaine Dupri

Jermaine Dupri singles chronology
"Get None" (1999)	"I've Got to Have It" (2000)	"Thank You" (2001)

Nas singles chronology
"You Owe Me" (2000)	"I've Got To Have It" (2000)	"Da Bridge 2001" (2000)

Monica singles chronology
"Right Here Waiting" (1999)	"I've Got To Have It" (2000)	"Just Another Girl" (2001)

"I've Got to Have It" is a song by American rappers Jermaine Dupri and Nas featuring American singer Monica, released by So So Def Recordings and Columbia Records on May 2, 2000 as the lead single for the soundtrack to the comedy film Big Momma's House (2000). Its production, helmed by Dupri, samples English singer Peter Gabriel's 1986 song "Sledgehammer".

== Chart performance ==
"I've Got to Have It" peaked at number 68 on the Hot R&B/Hip-Hop Songs chart, but failed to enter the Billboard Hot 100.

== Music video ==
Dupri, Nas, and Monica teamed with director Dave Meyers to shoot a video for the song, which depicts them hosting a party under the watchful eye of Martin Lawrence in his role as Big Momma.

== Charts ==
Weekly chart performance for "I've Got to Have It"
Chart (2000)	Peak position
Netherlands (Dutch Top 40 Tipparade)	16
Germany (GfK)	76
US Hot R&B/Hip-Hop Songs (Billboard)	67
US R&B/Hip-Hop Airplay (Billboard)	68
US Hot Rap Songs (Billboard)	15
