= U Should've Known Better =

2004 single by Monica

Single by Monica

from the album All Eyez on Me and After the Storm
- Released: March 8, 2004
- Studio: SouthSide (Atlanta, Georgia)
- Length: 4:17 (radio edit)
- Label: J
- Songwriters: Monica Arnold; Jermaine Mauldin; Bryan-Michael Cox; Harold Lilly
- Producers: Jermaine Dupri; Bryan-Michael Cox

Monica singles chronology
"Get It Off" (2003)	"U Should've Known Better" (2004)	"Everytime tha Beat Drop" (2006)

Music video
- "U Should've Known Better" on YouTube

"U Should've Known Better" is a song by American singer Monica. It was written in collaboration with Harold Lilly and Jermaine Dupri, and produced by the latter along with frequent co-producer Bryan Michael Cox for her original third studio album, All Eyez on Me (2002). When the album was shelved for release outside Japan, the song was one out of five original records that were transferred into its new version, After the Storm (2003). An R&B slow jam, "U Should've Known Better" contains elements of soul and rock music. Built on an pulsating backbeat, the song's instrumentation consists of screeching guitars and an understated harp pattern. Lyrically, Monica, as the protagonist, delivers a message of loyalty to her imprisoned love interest and sings about staying down for him despite his doubts.

The song was generally well received by contemporary music critics who highlighted the heartfelt emotion and sadness. Released as the fourth and final single from After the Storm on March 8, 2004, the single marked Monica's first balladic release in over five years. On the charts, "U Should've Known Better" peaked at number 19 on the US Billboard Hot 100 and number 6 on the Hot R&B/Hip-Hop Singles & Tracks, becoming the album's highest-charting single release after "So Gone". Its accompanying music video was shot by director Benny Boom, and filmed in Mexico in April 2004. It features rapper Young Buck as Monica's love interest.

== Background ==
In an interview with MTV News in June 2000, Monica revealed that she was planning to start work on a follow-up to her 1998 album The Boy Is Mine throughout the summer season, with a first single to be released by October of the same year. The following month, personal tribulations put a temporary halt on the album's production when her former boyfriend Jarvis "Knot" Weems committed suicide. In July 2000, Monica and Weems were together at the graveside of Weems's brother, who had died in an automobile accident at age 25 in 1998, when Weems, without warning, put a gun to his head and shot himself to death. Knot left behind a daughter from a previous relationship, who Monica took into care after going into hiatus. In early 2001, Monica eventually decided to resume recording to prepare the release of her third album in fall 2001. Throughout the process, Monica primarily worked with her usual stable of producers, which included Dallas Austin, production team Soulshock & Karlin, Bryan Michael Cox, and Rodney Jerkins and his Darkchild crew. Though she "had never thought about writing much" by then, her producers encouraged the singer to intensify her work on the All Eyez on Me album and to write and contribute own lyrics and ideas to the songs, one of which was the ballad "U Should've Known Better."

== Production and release ==
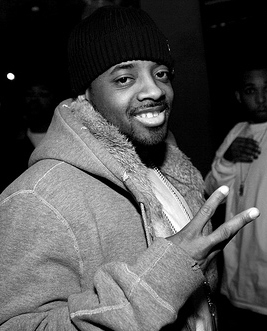
The song was co-written and produced by mentor Jermaine Dupri.

Monica penned the song along with Harold Lilly and longtime contributor Jermaine Dupri, while production on the track was helmed by Dupri and Bryan Michael Cox. "U Should've Known Better" was mixed by Phil Tan with further assistance from Dupri and John Horesco IV. William Odum played the guitar, while recording at the SouthSide Studios in Atlanta, Georgia was overseen Brian Frye. He was assisted by Tadd Mingo, and Javier Valeverde. A sultry ballad, the lyrics of the song deal with misunderstandings in a relationship, which conduce to doubts about love's veracity. Nonetheless Monica, as the female protagonist, promises her man she'll stay with him, singing lines like: "It don't matter if you're up, matter if you're down, either way I'm gonna be around." In a July 2002 interview with MTV News, Monica revealed that the song was inspired by a relationship that initially appeared promising but ended when the man was incarcerated, alluding to her relationship with rapper C-Murder, who had been arrested in connection with the murder of 16-year-old Steve Thomas and later sentenced to life in prison on August 14, 2009. When the US release of All Eyez on Me was shelved, the song was one out of five original records that were transferred into its new version, After the Storm. Although a duet with DMX, "Don't Gotta Go Home", was expected be released as the album's fourth single at times, "U Should've Known Better" eventually replaced original plans.

== Chart performance ==
Released as the album's fourth and final single in March 2004, "U Should've Known Better" opened as the Hot Shot Debut of the week at number 72 on Billboard's Hot R&B/Hip-Hop Singles & Tracks chart in the week of April 3, 2004. However, it took another three months until the song entered the Billboard Hot 100 chart, where it debuted at number 67 in the week of June 6, 2004, the second-highest debut of the week. "U Should've Known Better" remained twenty weeks on the chart, reaching its peak position of number 19 in its ninth week. It marked the second single from After the Storm to reach the top twenty on the Hot 100chart and, as the album's final single, would remain its second highest-charting offering behind leading single "So Gone."

Although never released on a CD single or CD maxi single format, "U Should've Known Better" was also successful on Billboard´s component charts. It reached number 6 on the Hot R&B/Hip-Hop Singles & Tracks—Monica's tenth non-consecutive top ten entry on that particular chart—as well as the top ten on the Hot R&B/Hip-Hop Airplay and the top twenty on the Hot 100 Airplay chart. It also appeared on the Rhythmic Top 40 at number 20. The song was ranked 72nd on the Hot R&B/Hip-Hop Singles 2004 year-end chart.

== Music video ==
Monica in the video for "U Should've Known Better"

A music video for "U Should've Known Better" was directed by Benny Boom and produced by Joyce Washington for FM Rocks, with Thomas Fanning serving as head of production. Cinematography was handled by French-born Israeli cinematographer Jonathan Sela. Filmed on location in Mexico in April 2004, the video features rapper Young Buck portraying Monica's love interest. The visuals premiered in May 2004 on BET's making of series Access Granted. It later received significant airplay on music video countdown programs, including BET's 106 & Park and MTV's Total Request Live.

The music video illustrates the song's theme of misunderstandings within a romantic relationship. It portrays Monica as a devoted girlfriend whose boyfriend, played by Young Buck, is imprisoned in Mexico. When she seeks assistance from a male friend, the boyfriend's best friend observes their interaction and misinterprets it as an act of infidelity. Monica then undertakes a journey across the Mexican desert to secure her boyfriend's release. The video concludes with the couple reuniting and returning home together.

== Track listing ==
US 12-inch vinyl
No.	Title	Producer(s)	Length
1.	"U Should've Known Better" (DIO club mix)	Dupri; Cox^{[A]}; Christian Dio^{[B]}	7:11
2.	"U Should've Known Better" (DIO radio mix)	Dupri; Cox^{[A]}; Christian Dio^{[B]}	3:58
3.	"U Should've Known Better" (Bass / Fonseca mixshow)	Dupri; Cox^{[A]}; Anthony Fonseca^{[B]}; Anton Bass^{[B]}	5:39
4.	"U Should've Known Better" (Bass / Fonseca instrumental)	Dupri; Cox^{[A]}; Fonseca^{[B]}; Bass^{[B]}	3:42
5.	"U Should've Known Better" (Bass / Fonseca radio)	Dupri; Cox^{[A]}; Fonseca^{[B]}; Bass^{[B]}	3:41

Notes

- ^{^[A]} denotes co-producer
- ^{^[B]} denotes additional producer

== Personnel ==
Personnel for After the Storm are adapted from the album's liner notes.

- Lead vocals – Monica Arnold
- Background vocals – Monica Arnold
- Mixing – Phil Tan, Jermaine Dupri
- Mixing assistance – John Horesco IV
- Guitar – William Odum
- Recording – Brian Frye at SouthSide Studios, Atlanta, Georgia
- Recording assistance – Tadd Mingo, Javier Valeverde
- Mastering – Tom Coyne

== Charts ==
=== Weekly charts ===
Weekly chart performance for "U Should've Known Better"
Chart (2004)	Peak position
US Billboard Hot 100	19
US Hot R&B/Hip-Hop Songs (Billboard)	6
US Rhythmic Airplay (Billboard)	20

=== Year-end charts ===
Year-end chart performance for "U Should've Known Better"
Chart (2004)	Position
US Billboard Hot 100	72
US Hot R&B/Hip-Hop Singles & Tracks (Billboard)	29
US Rhythmic Top 40 (Billboard)	85

== Release history ==
Release dates and formats for "U Should've Known Better"
Region	Date	Format(s)	Label(s)	Ref.
United States	March 8, 2004	Urban AC; urban radio	J	
United States	June 8, 2004	Rhythmic contemporary radio	J	
United States	August 9, 2004	Contemporary hit radio	J	
