= All Eyez on Me (Monica song) =

2002 single by Monica

Single by Monica

from the album All Eyez on Me
- Released: July 1, 2002
- Studio: Patchwerk (Atlanta, Georgia)
- Length: 4:00
- Label: J
- Songwriters: Monica Arnold; LaShawn Daniels; Rodney Jerkins; James Ingram; Quincy Jones
- Producer: Rodney "Darkchild" Jerkins

Monica singles chronology
"Just Another Girl" (2001)	"All Eyez on Me" (2002)	"Too Hood" (2002)

Music video
- "All Eyez on Me" on YouTube

"All Eyez on Me" is a song by American singer Monica. It was written in collaboration with Rodney "Darkchild" Jerkins and LaShawn Daniels for her original third studio album of the same name, while production was helmed by the former. The song incorporates excerpts of "P.Y.T. (Pretty Young Thing)" (1983) by American singer Michael Jackson. Due to the inclusion of the sample, Quincy Jones and James Ingram are also credited as songwriters. A lighthearted party jam that is built on a danceable groove, "All Eyez on Me" talks about self-confidence.

Picked as the album's leading single and Monica's first release on Clive Davis' then newly founded J Records label, "All Eyez on Me" was released to US radio on July 1, 2002. Its impact on the charts, however, was moderate in comparison with previous releases as it reached the top 20 in Belgium and the top 40 in Australia and New Zealand but failed to reach the upper half of the US Billboard Hot 100. The lukewarm response to the track and its follow-up "Too Hood" eventually resulted in the reconstruction of the same-titled album, which received a Japan-wide release only and was subsequently retooled into a new version, branded After the Storm (2003).

== Writing and recording ==
"All Eyez on Me" was written by Monica along with songwriter LaShawn Daniels and producer Rodney "Darkchild" Jerkins. Recorded at the latter's Patchwerk recording studios in Atlanta, Georgia, it is one out of nine songs the singer wrote or co-wrote for the album. She has described the track as a "party record" and "a feel-good song for the summer," stylistically comparing it with Michael Jackson's 1983 song "P.Y.T. (Pretty Young Thing)" from his album Thriller (1982), which the song partially samples. Due to this, Quincy Jones and James Ingram are also credited as songwriters. "The same way that 'P.Y.T.' was, I was hoping 'All Eyez on Me' would be – more relaxing and you could have a good time," she later told MTV News. "It's not based on anything emotional or anything sad." Jackson hand-delivered the original masters of the song for the production.

The song's title also is a nod to rapper Tupac Shakur, whose same titled song from 1996 served as "somewhat of an inspiration," Monica also remarked. "I always liked the idea of 'all eyes on me,' even from his perspective. Because sometimes that's what our life becomes. I thought that would grab the attention of a lot of people." In an interview with Vibe, she replied, that "All Eyez on Me" was "not one of those vain, stuck-up songs, like, 'Everybody's lookin' at me'." On her decision to release "All Eyez on Me" as the lead single from its parent album, she elaborated: "The world has had plenty of tragedy to deal with recently so I wanted to do something that had a 'feel good' flavor to it [...] So when you go out and have a good time, if you get dressed up in the right thing, all eyes will be on you." The song was later omitted from After the Storm, the re-tooled version of the album, since Monica felt that it "was a great song, but it didn't reflect the rest of the album, it was misleading."

== Chart performance ==
"All Eyez on Me" debuted at number 67 on the US Billboard Hot R&B/Hip-Hop Singles & Tracks chart on the week of July 6, 2002, becoming that week's Hot Shot Debut. In August 2002, it entered the Billboard Hot 100 at number 70. The song eventually reached and peaked at number 69 a week later, becoming Monica's least successful lead single up to then as well her lowest-charting single since 1999's "Street Symphony." On Billboard's component charts, "All Eyez on Me" reached number 19 on the Rhythmic Top 40 chart and the top 40 on the Mainstream Top 40 chart.

Elsewhere, "All Eyez on Me" enjoyed similar success. It entered the top 20 in both regions of Belgium, peaking at number 11 on the Wallonian Ultratip chart, while also reaching number 12 on the Flemish equivalent. The song also charted at number 29 in New Zealand and number 39 in Australia, and reached the lower halves of the national top 100 singles charts in Germany and Switzerland. Though generally mildly successful, as of 2021, "All Eyez on Me" remains her latest entry on all these chart as no further singles by Monica have been released or charted there ever since.

== Music video ==
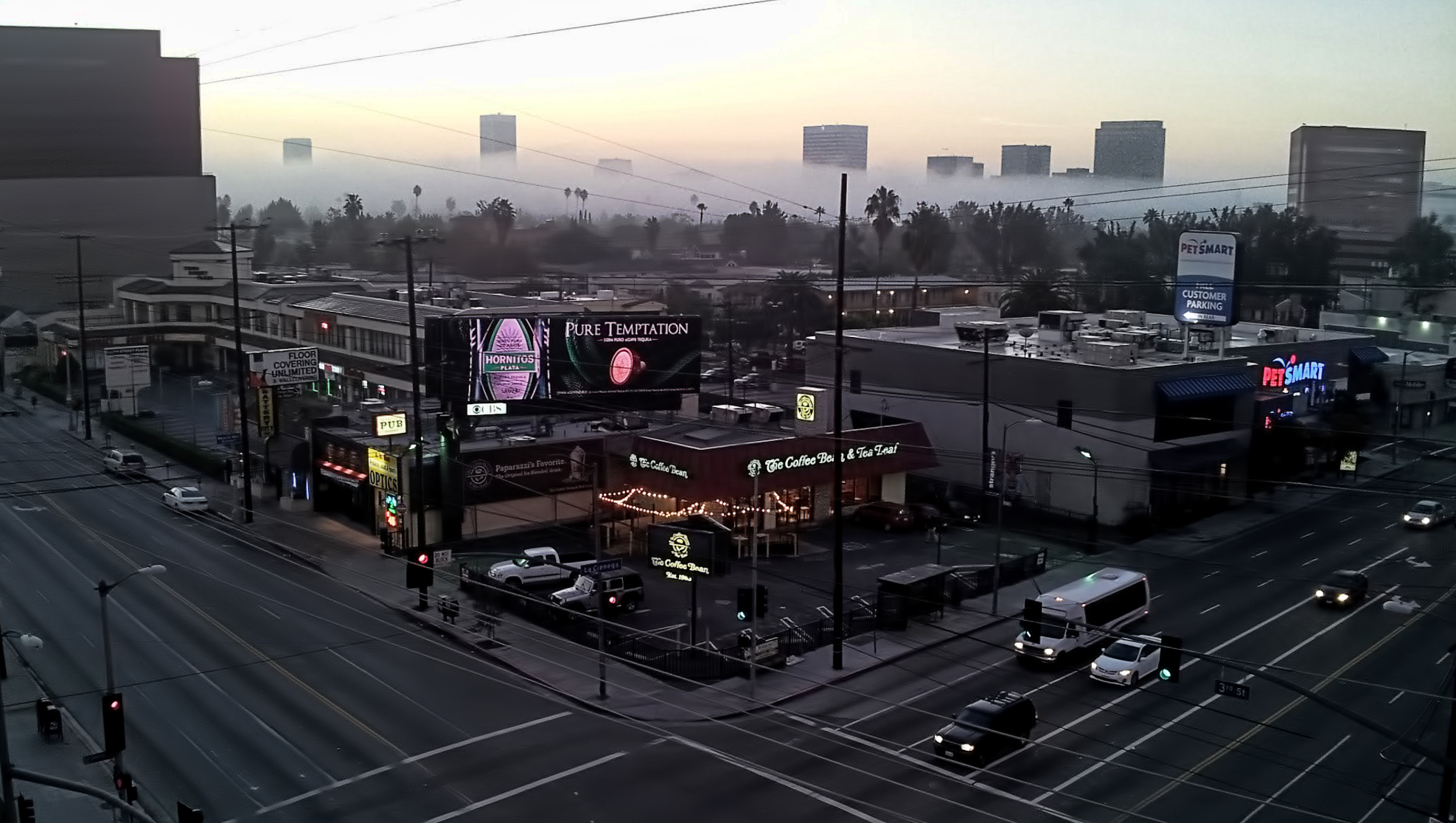
The music video for "All Eyez on Me" was filmed in various locations throughout Los Angeles County.

An accompanying music video for "All Eyez on Me" was directed by Chris Robinson and filmed at several locations in Beverly Hills and Mid-City West, Los Angeles, California between July 14–15, 2002. On the concept of the video, Monica commented: "The theme of the video is me just getting up, going about a normal day," she said. "I got a chance to just go shopping and stuff like that, but this scene is more of me dancing and having a good time, like the song says, in the club. So that's basically the whole theme of it. Just to have a good time."

The video features guest appearances by rappers Missy Elliott, Jermaine Dupri, Ludacris, Trina, and Mia X, producer Rodney Jerkins and Monica's younger brother Montez Arnold. "All Eyez on Me" was partially choreographed by Devyne Stephens. The video world premiered at the end of BET's documentary series Access Granted on July 26, 2002.

== Track listings ==
All tracks written by Monica Arnold, LaShawn Daniels, Rodney Jerkins, James Ingram, and Quincy Jones.

CD single
No.	Title	Producer(s)	Length
1.	"All Eyez on Me" (Radio Edit)	Jerkins	3:58
2.	"All Eyez on Me" (Blacksmith Club Radio Mix featuring Rahzel)	Jerkins; Daniels^{[a]}; Blacksmith^{[b]}	4:22
3.	"All Eyez on Me" (MaUVe Vocal Mix)	Jerkins; Daniels^{[a]}; MaUVe^{[b]}	7:33
4.	"All Eyez on Me" (MaUVe Dub Mix)	Jerkins; Daniels^{[a]}; MaUVe^{[b]}	7:14

12-inch single 1
No.	Title	Producer(s)	Length
1.	"All Eyez on Me" (Radio Edit)	Jerkins; Daniels^{[a]}	3:58
2.	"All Eyez on Me" (Instrumental)	Jerkins	3:58
3.	"All Eyez on Me" (Radio Mix)	Jerkins; Daniels^{[a]}	3:58
4.	"All Eyez on Me" (Acappella)	Jerkins; Daniels^{[a]}	3:58

12-inch single 2
No.	Title	Producer(s)	Length
1.	"All Eyez on Me" (Blacksmith Club Rub)	Jerkins; Daniels^{[a]}; Blacksmith^{[b]}	4:27
2.	"All Eyez on Me" (Blacksmith Clubstrumental)	Jerkins; Daniels^{[a]}; Blacksmith^{[b]}	4:27
3.	"All Eyez on Me" (Radio Edit)	Jerkins; Daniels^{[a]}	3:58
4.	"All Eyez on Me" (Instrumental)	Jerkins	3:58

Notes

- ^{^a} denotes vocal producer(s)
- ^{^b} denotes additional producer(s)

Sample credits

- "All Eyez on Me" contains excerpts from the composition "P.Y.T. (Pretty Young Thing)" (1982) by Michael Jackson.

== Credits and personnel ==
Credits lifted from the liner notes of All Eyez on Me.

- Monica Arnold – lead vocals, writer
- LaShawn Daniels – vocal production, writer
- James Ingram – writer (sample)
- Rodney "Darkchild" Jerkins – music, producer, writer
- Quincy Jones – writer (sample)
- Fabian Marascuillo – recording
- Manny Marroquin – mixing
- Tommy Martin – guitar

== Charts ==
=== Weekly charts ===
Weekly chart performance for "All Eyez on Me"
Chart (2002)	Peak position
Australia (ARIA)	39
Australian Urban (ARIA)	11
Belgium (Ultratip Bubbling Under Flanders)	12
Belgium (Ultratip Bubbling Under Wallonia)	11
Germany (GfK)	81
New Zealand (Recorded Music NZ)	29
US Billboard Hot 100	69
US Hot R&B/Hip-Hop Songs (Billboard)	32
US Pop Airplay (Billboard)	37
US Rhythmic Airplay (Billboard)	19

=== Year-end charts ===
Year-end chart performance for "All Eyez on Me"
Chart (2002)	Position
UK Urban (Music Week)	9

== Release history ==
Release dates and formats for "All Eyez on Me"
Region	Date	Format(s)	Label(s)	Ref.
United States	July 1, 2002	Rhythmic contemporary; urban radio	J Records	
New Zealand	October 7, 2002	CD	J Records	
Australia	October 14, 2002	CD	J Records	
