= All Eyez on Me (Monica album) =

Studio album by Monica
- Released: September 11, 2002 (Japan)
- Recorded: 2000–2002
- Genre: R&B
- Length: 47:24
- Label: J
- Producers: Dallas Austin; Peter Biker; Bryan Michael Cox; Jermaine Dupri; David Foster; Fred Jerkins III; Rodney "Darkchild" Jerkins; Soulshock & Karlin; Ric Wake

Monica chronology
The Boy Is Mine (1998)	All Eyez on Me (2002)	After the Storm (2003)

Singles from All Eyez on Me
- 1. "All Eyez on Me" Released: June 17, 2002

All Eyez on Me is the third album by the American recording artist Monica. Named after its lead single "All Eyez on Me", it marked the singer's first record under Clive Davis's J Records roster, and was first released on September 11, 2002, in Japan. The tracks on the album are a mixture of uptempo songs and ballads, and it was crafted by producers such as Dallas Austin, Bryan Michael Cox, Jermaine Dupri, Rodney "Darkchild" Jerkins, and Soulshock & Karlin.

Released to mixed reviews by music critics, the album reached number 14 on the Japanese Albums chart. Its preceding lead single, "All Eyez on Me", achieved moderate commercial success on the charts. Expected to be released on November 12, 2002, in the United States, the album was eventually put on hold after being heavily bootlegged following its Japanese release and became widely available through Internet file-sharing services. The album was then partially re-recorded and retooled as After the Storm in 2003 with original album cut, "U Should've Known Better", released as its fourth single in 2004.

== Background ==
In June 2000, in an interview with MTV News, Monica revealed that she was planning to start working on a follow-up to her 1998 album, The Boy Is Mine, throughout the summer season, with a first single to be released by October of the same year. Expressing her interest in reteaming with the core musicians she had worked with on her second album – including frequent collaborators Dallas Austin, Rodney Jerkins, David Foster, Daryl Simmons, and Jermaine Dupri – the singer expected the album to be released in the first quarter of 2001 following her involvement with Oscar Mayer's Jingle Jam Talent Search contest and the filming of her first major motion picture, Love Song (2001). The following month, personal tribulations put a temporary halt on the album's production when her former boyfriend Jarvis "Knot" Weems committed suicide. In July 2000, Monica and Weems were together at the graveside of Weems's brother, who had died in an automobile accident at age 25 in 1998, when Weems, without warning, put a gun to his head and shot himself to death. Knot left behind a daughter from a previous relationship, who Monica took into care after going into hiatus. "Jarvis' death had everything to do with me not working," she said in 2001. "I was not able [...] I was working all these hours after it happened, [but] I realized in the midst of everything, I couldn't handle it. I'm not ashamed to say that I decided to step back and get the help I needed to really come from within."

== Recording and production ==
In the first quarter of 2001, Monica's single "Just Another Girl", taken from the soundtrack of the 2001 motion picture Down to Earth, was released. An uptempo R&B track dealing with relationship issues, Monica noted that the song did not "pertain to the stage in my life I'm in, so I'm really waiting and looking for material that will take you to some of the depths in my soul. It was very difficult to juggle all of those things and then try to be a family for his kids at the same time. I'm hoping to be an inspiration to a lot of young women." She eventually decided to return to the recording studio to prepare the release of her third album in fall 2001. Over the course of the sessions, Clive Davis – who had taken the singer with him from his former label, Arista Records, to his latest venture, J Records – emerged as Monica's new mentor. Davis replaced producer Dallas Austin, while longtime contributor Jermaine Dupri served as the album's executive producer. Throughout the process, Monica primarily focused on working with her usual stable of producers, which also included Austin, production duo Soulshock & Karlin, Bryan Michael Cox, and Rodney Jerkins and his Darkchild crew. Though she "had never thought about writing much" by then, her producers encouraged the singer to intensify her work on the album and to write and contribute own lyrics and ideas to the songs. "I didn't have one concept in mind: I just thought about the situations and that they might be worth sharing." In the end Monica came up with nine songs for her third album, which she declared as "quite serious" because of its more-adult subject-matter and moreover called it her "'coming of age' record" with the view to "establish the kind of fans who will be with me for the next ten years and more". Although the album was tentatively titled I'm Back and Monica at one time or another, it was eventually named after the album's lead single, "All Eyez on Me".

== Critical reception ==
Professional ratings
Review scores
Source	Rating
Blender	2/5 stars
Soul in Stereo	3.5/5 stars

Upon its limited release, All Eyez on Me received generally mixed reviews from music critics. Michael Endelman wrote in his early review for The Boston Globe that "like recent releases from Christina Aguilera and Brandy, the new album from Monica finds the 21-year-old R&B singer trying to escape her teen-pop past. Thankfully, the result is more successful than Aguilera's recent foray into brazen sexuality and strained grunge rock. Her first album in four years, All Eyez on Me continues the pleasant, light-hearted soul that Monica is known for, while expanding into more mature subject matter." Blender magazine's Dorian Lynskey, on the other hand, rated the album two out of five stars only. He sumed All Eyez on Me as "standard-issue R&B, competently rendered" and called it "a briskly efficient affair. Hired hands [...] earn their paychecks with a fistful of potential hits [...] but Monica has neither the vocal presence nor the charisma to convince us that someone else couldn't do an equally good job with the same bland, assembly-line material."

In a retrospective review of Monica's album discography, Soul in Stereo's Edward Bowser rated the album three and a half stars out of five and ranked it seventh ouf of her eight albums that were released until 2018. He wrote: "The album itself is pretty solid, filled with lots of familiar samples and loaded with promise." He cited "Too Hood", "All Eyez on Me", and "I'm Back" his favorite tracks on All Eyez on Me.

== Release and performance ==
Though originally expected to be released worldwide, All Eyez on Me received a wide release on September 11, 2002, in Japan only. The set was initially scheduled for a US release in July 2002 and then pushed back to August and September before a November 12 release date was set. By the time it was being scheduled for domestic release however, All Eyez on Me had been heavily bootlegged in Japan and become widely available through Internet file-sharing services. In addition, the first single released from the project, "All Eyez on Me" had experienced moderate success on the charts, while promotional single "Too Hood" also got a lukewarm response. As a result, the album was pulled from stores days after the release and Monica's label J Records asked her to substantially reconstruct the record with a host of new producers, including musician Missy Elliott who would emerge as the new version's executive producer.

Though Rodney Jerkins-produced "Ain't Gonna Cry No More" was considered to be released as a single at times, All Eyez on Me yielded just one single. Its lead single, "All Eyez on Me", entered the top 40 in Australia and New Zealand but barely made it to the top 70 of the US Billboard Hot 100 chart and peaked at number 24 on the component Hot R&B/Hip-Hop Singles & Tracks chart. The first and only promotional single, "Too Hood", featuring Jermaine Dupri, received a limited vinyl release only since J Records denied to produce a music video for the song. It, however, was included on a limited edition bonus CD with re-worked After the Storm in 2003.

== Track listing ==
Some songs appear with different titles than the re-tooled release, After the Storm.

All Eyez on Me track listing
No.	Title	Writer(s)	Producer(s)	Length
1.	"I'm Back"	Monica Arnold; Bryan Michael Cox; Harold Lilly; Andy Armer; Randy Alpert	Cox; Jermaine Dupri^{[B]}; Lilly^{[D]}	3:35
2.	"All Eyez on Me"	Arnold; LaShawn Daniels; James Ingram; Quincy Jones	Rodney "Darkchild" Jerkins; Daniels^{[D]}	4:00
3.	"U Should've Known ^{[A]}"	Arnold; Cox; Dupri; Lilly	Dupri; Cox^{[C]}	4:18
4.	"Too Hood ^{[A]}" (featuring Jermaine Dupri)	Arnold; Cox; Dupri; Lilly	Dupri; Cox^{[C]}	4:04
5.	"I Wrote This Song ^{[A]}"	Arnold; Shamora Crawford; Kenneth Karlin; Carsten Shack; Damon Sharpe; Shuggie Otis	Soulshock & Karlin	3:48
6.	"U Deserve" (featuring Hussein Fatal)	Arnold; Lilly; Rufus Cooper; Katari Cox; Yaleu Fula; Joseph Paquette; Tupac Shakur; Bruce Washington; Tyrone Wrice	Dallas Austin	4:24
7.	"Breaks My Heart ^{[A]}"	Shack; Karlin; Crawford	Soulshock & Karlin	4:27
8.	"Ain't Gonna Cry No More ^{[A]}"	Arnold; Jerkins; Fred Jerkins III; Daniels	Jerkins; Daniels^{[D]}	4:10
9.	"If U Were the Girl"	Arnold; Dupri; Cox; Lilly; Calvin Broadus; Awood Johnson; Craig Lawson; Corey Miller	Dupri; Cox^{[C]}	3:51
10.	"What Hurts the Most ^{[A]}"	Shack; Peter Biker; Crawford	Soulshock & Karlin; Biker	4:44
11.	"Searchin'"	Arnold; Lilly	Cox	4:30

Bonus tracks
No.	Title	Writer(s)	Producer(s)	Length
12.	"Just Another Girl"	Damon Sharpe; Lindy Robbins; Carsten Lindberg; Joachim Svare	Ric Wake; Richard "Richie" Jones^{[B]}; Great Dane^{[B]}	3:24
13.	"What My Heart Says"	Diane Warren	David Foster	3:59

Notes

- ^{^[A]} denotes later inclusion on After the Storm
- ^{^[B]} denotes additional producer
- ^{^[C]} denotes co-producer
- ^{^[D]} denotes vocal producer

Sample credits

- "I'm Back" contains interpolations from Herb Alpert's 1979 composition "Rise", written by Andy Armer and Randy Alpert.
- "All Eyez on Me" contains excerpts from Michael Jackson's 1982 song "P.Y.T. (Pretty Young Thing)", written by Quincy Jones and James Ingram.
- "I Wrote This Song" contains excerpts from the composition "Aht Uh Mi Hed" (1970), written and performed by Shuggie Otis.
- "U Deserve" samples from Tupac's "Hail Mary" (1996), written by Rufus Cooper, Katari Cox, Yaleu Fula, Joseph Paquette, Tupac Shakur, Bruce Washington, and Tyrone Wrice.
- "If U Were the Girl" sample from C-Murder' composition "Down 4 My Niggas" (2000), written by Calvin Broadus, Awood Johnson, Craig Lawson, and Corey Miller.

== Credits and personnel ==
Credits are taken from the album's liner notes.

Performers and musicians

- Montez Arnold – keyboards
- Shamora Crawford – backing vocals
- DJ Mars – programming
- Eric Jackson – guitar
- Marc Kelly – bass guitar
- New Birth Praise Team – backing vocals
- Tommy Martin – guitar
- William Odum – guitar

Production

- A&R – Larry Jackson, Keith Naftaly
- Album coordination – Melinda Dancil
- Art direction – Alexis Yraola
- Engineering – Ralph Cacciurri, Doug Harms, Tim Lauber, Carlton Lynn, Bill Malina
- Mastering – Tony Dawsey
- Mixing – Kevin Davis, R. Jerkins, Manny Marroquin, Carsten Shack, Dexter Simmons, Phil Tan
- Mixing assistance – John Horesco IV
- Photography – Joshua Jordan
- Photo shoot production – Chris LeBeau
- Vocal production – LaShawn Daniels, Harold Lilly, Rodney Jerkins

== Charts ==
Chart performance for All Eyez on Me
Chart (2002–2003)	Peak position
Japanese Albums (Oricon)	14
Swiss Albums (Schweizer Hitparade)	88

== Release history ==
All Eyez on Me release history
Region	Date	Format	Label	Ref.
Japan	September 11, 2002	CD	BMG Japan	
