= Strafe (band) =

American hip hop group

- Origin: Brooklyn, New York, US
- Genres: Electro, old school hip hop
- Years active: 1984–unknown
- Labels: Jus Born Productions; A&M Records
- Members: Steve Standard

Strafe is an American electro group that gained popularity in the mid-1980s. The group is primarily known for its single "Set It Off" (1984), which has been extensively sampled by hip-hop, house, techno, and EDM artists.

== Partial discography ==
- "Set It Off" (12-inch single) (Jus Born Productions, 1984)
- "Comin’ from Another Place" (12-inch single) (A&M Records, 1985)
- "React" (12-inch single) (A&M Records, 1985)
- "Outlaw" (12-inch single) (A&M Records, 1987)
