= The Masqueraders =

1928 novel by Georgette Heyer

- First edition
- Author: Georgette Heyer
- Language: English
- Genre: Georgian, Romance
- Publisher: William Heinemann
- Publication date: 1928
- Publication place: United Kingdom
- Media type: Print (hardback & paperback)
- Pages: 304 pp

The Masqueraders is a 1928 novel written by Georgette Heyer. It is set in Britain at a time shortly after the 1745 Jacobite rising and is concerned with a family of adventurers and escaped Jacobites.

== Plot summary ==
To escape exposure as a former Jacobite, Robin and his sister Prudence have exchanged identities and assumed new names. The tall sister takes the name Peter while the slighter Robin is disguised as his younger sister, Kate. On their way to London, the pair encounter Gregory Markham eloping with a beautiful heiress named Letitia Grayson and rescue her. Shortly afterwards Sir Anthony, a friend of Letitia's father, arrives to discover that the elopement has already been frustrated and takes her home.

"Peter" and "Kate" take refuge in London with Lady Lowestoft, a former admirer of their adventurous father, and quickly rise to social prominence. Peter/Prudence comes under the patronage of Sir Anthony in particular, but he is recognised by the vengeful Markham, who tries to have him beaten by Mohocks. Later Peter is provoked into challenging Markham's friend Rensley to a duel. Hearing of this, Sir Anthony forestalls their fight by insulting Rensley in order to force him into an earlier duel and disables him. Startled by this intervention, Prudence/Peter begins to wonder if Sir Anthony suspects her masquerade.

Meanwhile, their father, whom they refer to as "The Old Gentleman", has arrived in London claiming to be the younger brother and legal heir of the recently deceased Viscount Barham, much to the consternation of Rensley, who had long believed himself to be the heir and who had already installed himself as the new lord. Under the name of "Tremaine of Barham" the polished new claimant rapidly insinuates himself into high society. He does not acknowledge his children immediately, while they, long used to his delusions of grandeur and multiple identities, are sceptical of his claims.

Prudence is invited to dine with Sir Anthony who, despite his air of sleepy detachment, has guessed that "Peter" is actually a woman and fallen in love with her. Prudence refuses his proposal, asking him to wait until her father's doubtful claim is proved. Sir Anthony verbally agrees, but resolves to carry her off and marry her whatever the outcome.

Having obtained a document that could get the Old Gentleman executed as a Jacobite himself, Markham attempts to blackmail him but is persuaded instead to exchange the incriminating letter for another that exposes Letitia's wealthy father as a traitor. Using this, Markham forces Letitia to run away with him again. To counter that, the Old Gentleman dispatches Robin/Kate, disguised as a highwayman, to kill Markham and steal back the exchanged document, thereby inspiring the romantic Letitia to fall in love with her unknown rescuer.

When questioned by the authorities, Letitia gives a false description of the "highwayman" to protect her love. Unfortunately, she unwittingly describes "Peter Merriot" and Prudence is arrested. Once more she is rescued by the respectable Sir Anthony from the officers of the law and they gallop cross-country to the residence of Sir Anthony's sister. There "Peter" dons a gown and becomes the dazzling Miss Prudence Tremaine.

Following "Peter's" disappearance, suspicion is cast over both the Merriots, and so "Kate" flees to France while Lady Lowestoft complains of the deception played upon her by her protégés. In the interval the Old Gentleman proves conclusively that he is indeed Tremaine of Barham and the former Kate returns from France, causing a sensation as Mr. Robin Tremaine, his handsome heir. Calling on Letitia's father, the future Viscount is readily accepted as a prospective son-in-law while Tremaine of Barham welcomes Sir Anthony as Prudence's fiancé and a son-in-law after his own heart.

== See also ==
- Georgette Heyer
