= P.Y.T. (Pretty Young Thing) =

1983 single by Michael Jackson

- US 7" vinyl

Single by Michael Jackson

from the album Thriller
- B-side: "This Place Hotel" (UK); "Working Day and Night"; "Thriller" (instrumental)
- Released: September 19, 1983
- Recorded: 1982
- Studio: Westlake (Los Angeles, California)
- Genre: Disco; funk; R&B; pop
- Length: 3:59
- Label: Epic
- Songwriters: James Ingram; Quincy Jones
- Producer: Quincy Jones

Michael Jackson singles chronology
"Human Nature" (1983)	"P.Y.T. (Pretty Young Thing)" (1983)	"Say Say Say" (1983)

Audio
- "P.Y.T. (Pretty Young Thing)" on YouTube

"P.Y.T. (Pretty Young Thing)" is a song by the American singer, songwriter and dancer Michael Jackson, released as the sixth single from his sixth album, Thriller (1982). The song was written by James Ingram and Quincy Jones.

"P.Y.T. (Pretty Young Thing)" was released on September 19, 1983. The single charted at number 10 on the US Billboard Hot 100 and number 46 on the Hot Black Singles chart, becoming the sixth top 10 hit from the album. It reached number 11 on the UK Singles Chart. The single was most successful in Belgium, charting within the top 10 at number 6. The song has been covered and sampled by numerous artists, including Monica, Justin Guarini and Kanye West. The original demo was also remixed by Black Eyed Peas singer will.i.am for Thriller 25.

== Background ==
Jones came up with the original title for the song after his then-wife, Peggy Lipton, brought lingerie with the words "pretty young thing" on it. From there, Jones asked several songwriters to write a song around the title. Jackson and musician Greg Phillinganes co-wrote and recorded a demo, which was presented to Jones by Phillinganes. That version is featured on The Ultimate Collection (2004). Jackson recalls that his version with Phillinganes was not what Jones was looking for. "Quincy wanted a fast song. Mine was mid-tempo." When James Ingram presented his demo, Jones said "that's it", and sent Ingram home to finish the lyrics. Jones then suggested they extend the bridge and add a chant section, resulting in Jones receiving a co-writer's credit. Jackson says he loved the version Ingram and Jones came up with, stating that he liked the "code" in the lyrics and the fact that words like "tenderoni" were fun rock 'n' roll-type words that couldn't be found in the dictionary.

== Recording ==
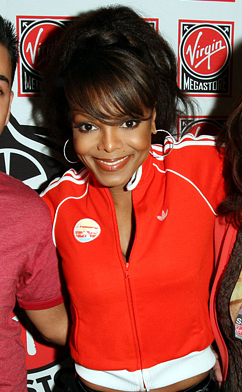
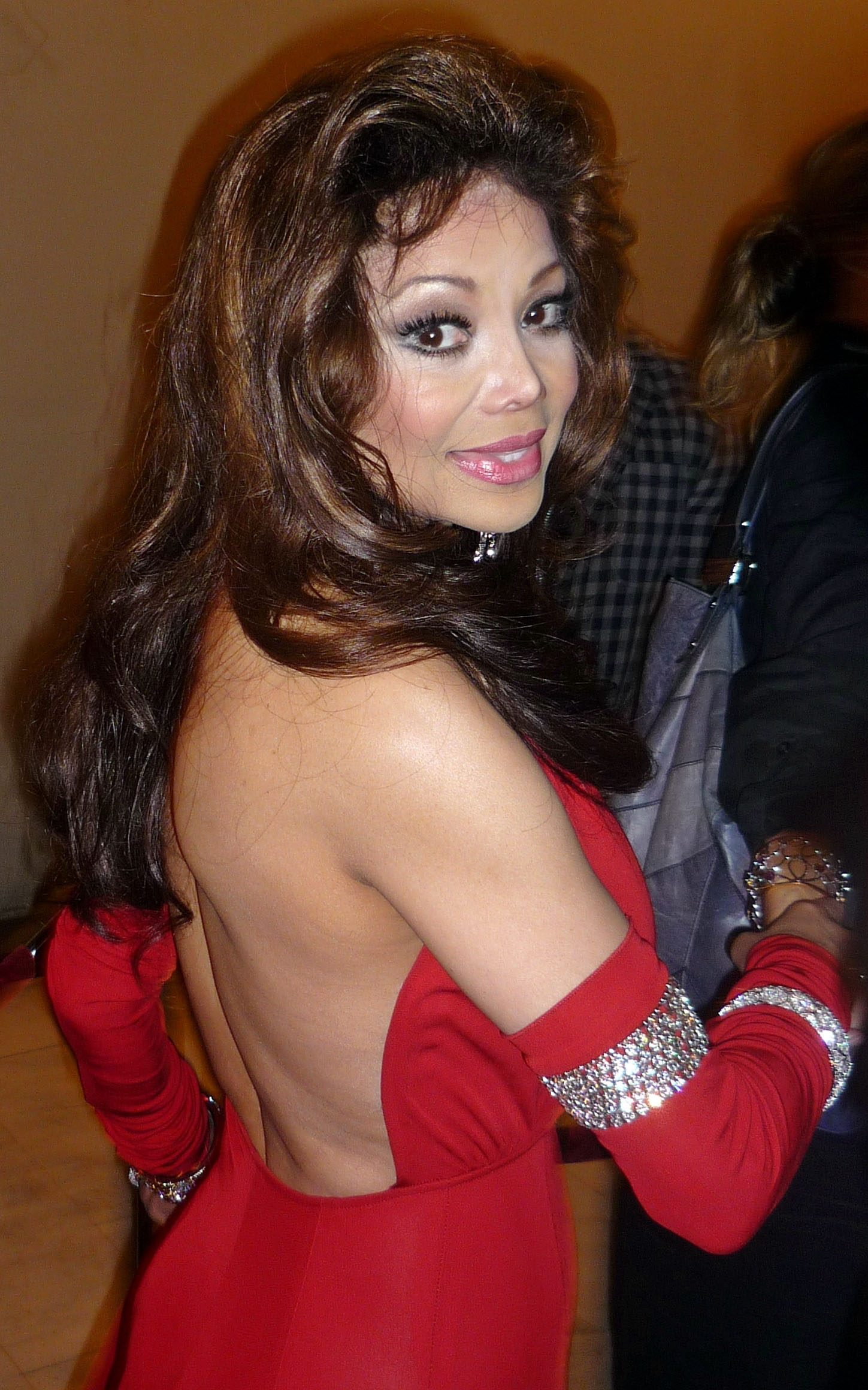
Jackson's sisters Janet Jackson (left) and La Toya Jackson (right) provided backing vocals in the guise of the P.Y.T.s.

Producer Quincy Jones allowed his long-time sound engineer Bruce Swedien to choose a large-diaphragm Shure SM7 dynamic microphone for Jackson's voice. The choice was unusual, as the microphone was more often seen in radio stations. For backing vocals, Swedien positioned Jackson at different distances from the microphone to record each track, to get a thicker sound.

James Ingram later described working with Jackson and Jones as being in The Wonderful Wizard of Oz. "It's almost like I got the chance to go to Oz and Quincy was the Wizard of Oz and Michael Jackson was who he was dealing with in his world. Their work ethic is unbelievable." He noted how Jones would fall asleep on the board, waking up to answer a question. "He works in the Alpha state a lot", Ingram added. Two of Jackson's sisters, Janet and La Toya, provided backing vocals in the guise of the P.Y.T.s. The two sisters sang "na na na" back at their brother towards the end of the song. According to the official sheet music at Musicnotes.com, "P.Y.T. (Pretty Young Thing)" is in the key of B minor. It has a tempo of 126 beats per minute, making it one of Jackson's fastest songs.

== Release and reception ==
"P.Y.T. (Pretty Young Thing)" was released in the US on September 19, 1983, as the sixth single from Thriller. The single charted at no. 10 on the Billboard Hot 100 and no. 46 on the Hot Black Singles chart, becoming the sixth Top 10 hit from Thriller. The song was released in Europe in March 1984. In the United Kingdom, the song reached a peak position of 11. It was most successful in Belgium, charting within the Top 10 at no. 6. The single was placed at no. 14 in the Netherlands. "P.Y.T. (Pretty Young Thing)" charted at number 24 in Canada and peaked at number 51 in Germany.

Response to "P.Y.T. (Pretty Young Thing)" was mixed to positive. Stephen Thomas Erlewine of AllMusic thought that it was "frizzy funk". Eric Henderson of Slant Magazine believed that "P.Y.T. (Pretty Young Thing)" was a "lush disco paradise". However, Rolling Stone reviewer Christopher Connelly, while discussing the album in a review, stated that the song "isn't up to the spunky character of the other tracks". Connelly mentioned that one of Jackson's weaknesses was "a tendency to go for the glitz", and cited the song as one example of this. Davitt Sigerson, from the same magazine, also agreed with Connelly, calling it one of Thriller's "forgettables". Jon Pareles of The New York Times called the song "fluff", and believed that the other songs from the album were what made Thriller such a hit. Felix Rowe of Classic Pop called the song "an R&B and pop cracker".

== P.Y.T. (Pretty Young Thing) 2008 ==
"P.Y.T. (Pretty Young Thing) 2008"

Song by Michael Jackson featuring will.i.am

from the album Thriller 25
- Released: 2008
- Length: 4:37
- Label: Epic
- Songwriters: Michael Jackson; William Adams; Keith Harris; Greg Phillinganes
- Producers: Michael Jackson; will.i.am

For Thriller 25, Black Eyed Peas frontman and producer will.i.am remixed the demo version of "P.Y.T. (Pretty Young Thing)" which Michael Jackson and Greg Phillinganes had co-written. The producer commented on Jackson and the project: "You always just dream of meeting him, let alone working with him. I wouldn't have believed it. I grew up in the projects in East Los Angeles and Thriller was filmed about two blocks from my house, but my mother was really strict and she wouldn't let me go to the factories—she didn't care who was filming a video there; but I'm on the 25th anniversary, 25 years later—that's pretty awesome." Entitled "P.Y.T. (Pretty Young Thing) 2008", the remix was well received by Rolling Stone. The publication described the track, along with "The Girl Is Mine 2008", as being one of the best songs on the album. They noted that will.i.am "updates the songs' original sound to make them dancefloor-worthy 25 years after their release".

== Personnel ==
- Written, composed and arranged by James Ingram and Quincy Jones
- Produced by Quincy Jones
- Michael Jackson – lead and backing vocals, handclaps
- Greg Phillinganes – Rhodes piano, synthesizers, synthesizer programming, handclaps
- Michael Boddicker – vocoder, E-mu Emulator
- James Ingram – Portasound keyboards, handclaps
- Paul Jackson Jr. – guitars
- Louis Johnson – electric bass, handclaps
- N'dugu Chancler – drums
- Steven Ray – handclaps
- P.Y.T.s:
  - Janet Jackson
  - La Toya Jackson
  - Becky Lopez
  - Bunny Hull
- Additional background vocals:
  - James Ingram
  - Howard Hewett

== Track listing ==
45 RPM

A-side

1. "P.Y.T (Pretty Young Thing)" – 3:59

B-side

1. "Working Day and Night" (live—Jacksons) – 4:26

Disco single

A-side

1. "P.Y.T (Pretty Young Thing)" – 3:59

B-side

1. "This Place Hotel" – 4:41
2. "Thriller" (instrumental) – 5:56

== Official versions ==
- Album version – 3:59
- Demo version – 3:47
- 2008 remix with will.i.am – 4:21

== Charts ==
=== Weekly charts ===
1983–1984 weekly chart performance for "P.Y.T. (Pretty Young Thing)"
Chart (1983–1984)	Peak position
Australia (Kent Music Report)	40
Belgium (Ultratop 50 Flanders)	6
Canada Adult Contemporary (RPM)	13
Canada Top Singles (RPM)	17
Europe (European Hot 100 Singles)	11
Netherlands (Dutch Top 40)	13
Netherlands (Single Top 100)	14
Ireland (IRMA)	4
UK Singles (Official Charts)	11
US Billboard Adult Contemporary	37
US Billboard Hot 100	10
US Billboard Hot Black Singles	46
US Cash Box	15
West Germany (GfK)	51

2009 weekly chart performance for "P.Y.T. (Pretty Young Thing)"
Chart (2009)	Peak position
Belgium (Back Catalogue Singles Flanders)	26
Canada (Hot Canadian Digital Singles)	48
Netherlands (Single Top 100)	68
Switzerland (Schweizer Hitparade)	92
UK Singles (OCC)	98
UK Hip Hop/R&B (Official Charts)	30
US Billboard Hot Digital Songs	14

2026 weekly chart performance for "P.Y.T. (Pretty Young Thing)"
Chart (2026)	Peak position
Global 200 (Billboard)	97
UK Hip Hop/R&B (Official Charts)	9
US Hot R&B/Hip-Hop Songs (Billboard)	15

=== Year-end charts ===
1983 year-end chart performance for "P.Y.T. (Pretty Young Thing)"
Chart (1983)	Position
US Cash Box	96

1984 year-end chart performance for "P.Y.T. (Pretty Young Thing)"
Chart (1984)	Position
Belgium (Ultratop 50 Flanders)	65

== Certifications ==
Certifications for "P.Y.T. (Pretty Young Thing)"
Region	Certification	Certified units/sales
Canada (Music Canada)	2× Platinum	160,000^{‡}
Denmark (IFPI Danmark)	Gold	45,000^{‡}
Mexico (AMPROFON)	2× Platinum	120,000^{‡}
New Zealand (RMNZ)	2× Platinum	60,000^{‡}
United Kingdom (BPI)	Platinum	600,000^{‡}
United States (RIAA)	4× Platinum	4,000,000^{‡}
^{‡} Sales+streaming figures based on certification alone.

== Cover versions and references to the song ==
- 2002: American Idol runner-up Justin Guarini sang "P.Y.T. (Pretty Young Thing)" on the first season of the show.
- 2007: A part of the lyrics to Justice's "D.A.N.C.E." refer to Jackson's song, and are said to be in homage to the singer.
- 2011: The song was performed in the second season of musical television series Glee in its twelfth episode "Silly Love Songs", by character Artie Abrams (played by Kevin McHale).
- 2012: The Wood Brothers performed a version of the song for The A.V. Club's A.V. Undercover series.
- 2017: John Gibbons covered "P.Y.T (Pretty Young Thing)". It charted at number 12 on the UK Dance Singles Chart, number one on the UK Indie Singles Chart and number 22 on the Scottish Singles Chart.

=== Certifications ===
Certifications for "P.Y.T. (Pretty Young Thing)" John Gibbons version
Region	Certification	Certified units/sales
Australia (ARIA)	Gold	35,000^{‡}
United Kingdom (BPI)	Gold	400,000^{‡}
^{‡} Sales+streaming figures based on certification alone.

=== Sampling ===
- 2002: "P.Y.T. (Pretty Young Thing)" was both sampled and interpolated in Monica's single "All Eyez on Me". "We used vocals from the song that didn't make the Thriller album", stated producer Rodney Jerkins. "He [Jackson] had more vocals and ad-libs that were never heard, and we used the ones that were not heard." Jackson hand-delivered his original masters to Monica, who, as a longtime Jackson fan, was touched by the move.
- 2003: The chorus of "P.Y.T. (Pretty Young Thing)" was sampled by rapper Memphis Bleek in "I Wanna Love U". The song, sung by Donell Jones, featured on Bleek's M.A.D.E. album.
- 2007: "P.Y.T. (Pretty Young Thing)" was also sampled in Kanye West's "Good Life", the third single from his Graduation album.
- 2023: "P.Y.T. (Pretty Young Thing)" was also sampled in DJ Khaled's "Supposed to Be Loved".

== Bibliography ==
- Halstead, Craig (2003). Michael Jackson the Solo Years. Authors On Line. ISBN 0-7552-0091-8.
- Halstead, Craig (2007). Michael Jackson: For the Record. Authors On Line. ISBN 978-0-7552-0267-6.
