= Another One of Me =

2023 single by Diddy, the Weeknd, and French Montana featuring 21 Savage

Single by Diddy, the Weeknd, and French Montana featuring 21 Savage

from the album The Love Album: Off the Grid
- Released: September 15, 2023
- Recorded: 2013
- Genre: R&B
- Length: 4:46
- Label: Love
- Songwriters: Sean Combs; Abel Tesfaye; Karim Kharbouch; Shéyaa Abraham-Joseph; Carlos Coleman; Uforo Ebong; Jason Quenneville; Eric Hudson; Roark Bailey; DeForrest Taylor
- Producers: Diddy; BongoByTheWay; DaHeala; Hudson; Bailey; Taylor

Diddy singles chronology
"Mandem" (2023)	"Another One of Me" (2023)

The Weeknd singles chronology
"K-pop" (2023)	"Another One of Me" (2023)	"One of the Girls" (2023)

French Montana singles chronology
"Frenchy" (2023)	"Another One of Me" (2023)	"Pit Stop" (2023)

21 Savage singles chronology
"Both" (2023)	"Another One of Me" (2023)	"Call Me Revenge" (2023)

Music video
- "Another One of Me" on YouTube

"Another One of Me" is a song by American rapper Diddy, Canadian singer the Weeknd, and Moroccan-American rapper French Montana featuring British-American rapper 21 Savage. It was released through Love Records as the only single from Diddy's fifth studio album, The Love Album: Off the Grid, on September 15, 2023, along with the album.

Diddy, the Weeknd, and 21 Savage had collaborated earlier on the remix of Metro Boomin's 2023 single, "Creepin'". The song was also promoted as the Weeknd's final feature, which the Weeknd stated while touring. He would later appear on the song "Young Metro" from the collaborative album We Don't Trust You by Future and Metro Boomin in 2024.

== Background and composition ==
The Weeknd first revealed a demo of the song through his radio show, Memento Mori, stating the demo was recorded during the sessions for his 2013 debut studio album, Kiss Land. During a show in Warsaw, Poland, for his After Hours til Dawn Tour on August 9, 2023, the Weeknd previewed the track, stating it would be his "last feature – in my career". That was proven untrue in 2024 when he collaborated on three songs from Future and Metro Boomin's second collaborative album We Still Don't Trust You and a song from the aforementioned rappers' first collaborative album We Don't Trust You, "Young Metro".

On the song, all four artists have their own verses, with Uproxx's Alex Gonzalez calling the Weeknd's lyrics on the chorus an "empowering farewell", in which he claims: "Another one of me won't come around again". The song features a drum sample from the English drummer Phil Collins' 1981 single, "In the Air Tonight".

== Music video ==
The official music video for "Another One of Me", directed by James Larese was released along with the song and album on September 15, 2023. The Weeknd, French Montana, and 21 Savage appear in a sci-fi-inspired background filled with glass pieces in the air and geometric statues with a dystopian look and it calms down as Diddy enters through the heavens at the end.

== Charts ==
Chart performance for "Another One of Me"
Chart (2023)	Peak position
Canada Hot 100 (Billboard)	83
Global 200 (Billboard)	167
Greece International (IFPI)	13
New Zealand Hot Singles (RMNZ)	11
UK Singles (OCC)	98
UK Indie (OCC)	41
US Billboard Hot 100	87
US Hot R&B/Hip-Hop Songs (Billboard)	34
US Rhythmic Airplay (Billboard)	18

== Release history ==
Release history for "Another One of Me"
Region	Date	Format	Label	Ref.
Various	September 15, 2023	Digital download; streaming	Love	
