= Code Red Experience =

2015 concert tour by Monica

- Tour by Monica
- Promotional poster
- Associated album: Code Red
- Start date: November 12, 2015
- End date: December 13, 2015
- Legs: 1
- No. of shows: 22 in North America

The Code Red Experience was a concert tour by American recording artist Monica, in support of her eighth studio album Code Red (2015). The tour played over 20 shows in the United States. It marks the singer's first headlining tour in 16 years.

== Opening acts ==
- Rico Love
- XSO (Las Vegas, San Francisco and Los Angeles)
- Atiba (Orlando)
- Michael Blackson (Orlando)
- Shawty-Shawty (Orlando)

== Set list ==
The following set list was obtained from the December 6, 2015 show; held at Sound Board in Detroit, Michigan. It does not represent all shows during the tour.

1. "Video Introduction" (contains elements of "Code Red")
2. "The First Night"
3. "Don't Take It Personal (Just One of Dem Days)"
4. "So Gone"
5. "Before You Walk Out of My Life"
6. "Video Sequence"
7. "Love Just Ain't Enough"
8. "Call My Name" (contains elements of "Say My Name")
9. "I Know"
10. "Why I Love You So Much"
11. "Video Sequence"
12. "For You I Will" / "Believing in Me" / "U Should've Known Better" / "Love All Over Me" / "Angel of Mine" / "Until It's Gone"
13. "I Miss Music"
14. "Everything to Me
15. "Video Sequence" (contains elements of "The Boy Is Mine")
16. "Still Standing"
17. "Just Right for Me"

== Tour dates ==
Date	City	Country	Venue
North America
November 12, 2015	Las Vegas	United States	Brooklyn Bowl
November 13, 2015	San Francisco	United States	Regency Ballroom
November 14, 2015	Los Angeles	United States	Club Nokia
November 15, 2015	Anaheim	United States	House of Blues
November 17, 2015	Phoenix	United States	Celebrity Theatre
November 19, 2015	Dallas	United States	House of Blues
November 21, 2015	Orlando	United States	Walt Disney Theater
November 22, 2015	Memphis	United States	The New Daisy Theatre
November 23, 2015	Louisville	United States	Mercury Ballroom
November 25, 2015	North Myrtle Beach	United States	House of Blues
November 27, 2015	Norfolk	United States	Norva Theatre
November 28, 2015	Raleigh	United States	The Ritz
November 29, 2015	Charlotte	United States	The Fillmore Charlotte
December 1, 2015	Cleveland	United States	House of Blues
December 2, 2015	Chicago	United States	House of Blues
December 3, 2015	Atlanta	United States	Center Stage Theater
December 4, 2015	Cincinnati	United States	Bogart's
December 6, 2015	Detroit	United States	Sound Board
December 8, 2015	Philadelphia	United States	Theatre of Living Arts
December 9, 2015	Silver Spring	United States	The Fillmore Silver Spring
December 10, 2015	Baltimore	United States	Baltimore Soundstage
December 13, 2015	New York City	United States	Hammerstein Ballroom

=== Box office score data ===
Venue	City	Tickets sold / available	Gross revenue
Club Nokia	Los Angeles	1,259 / 1,500 (84%)	$44,067
Sound Board	Detroit	1,523 / 1,530 (~100%)	$57,710
