= Gotta Move On (Diddy song) =

Single by Diddy featuring Bryson Tiller

from the album The Love Album: Off the Grid (Expanded Edition)
- Released: June 17, 2022
- Genre: R&B
- Label: Love; Motown
- Composers: Sean Combs; Jerome Monroe; Joshua Huizar; Kentaro "RNSOM" Kawamura; Olubowale Victor Akintimehin; Roark Bailey; Travis Walton
- Producers: Teddy Walton; J-Louis; RNSM; Bailey; SlimWav

Diddy singles chronology
"Watcha Gon Do?" (2017)	"Gotta Move On" (2022)	"Sex In the Porsche" (2022)

Bryson Tiller singles chronology
"Body in Motion" (2021)	"Gotta Move On" (2022)	"Outside" (2022)

"Gotta Move On" is a song by American rapper and record executive Diddy. It features guest vocals from singer Bryson Tiller and production from Teddy Walton, J-Louis, RNSM, Roark Bailey SlimWav — all of whom co-wrote the track with backing vocalist Wale. Influenced by dancehall, it was released as a single by Motown and Love Records on June 17, 2022 and intended to lead his fifth album, The Love Album: Off the Grid (2023); however, the song was included on the album's expanded edition. The accompanying music video was directed by singer Teyana Taylor under the pseudonym "Spike Tee".

"Gotta Move On" peaked at number 79 on the Billboard Hot 100 and became Diddy's first entry on the chart since his 2010 single "Coming Home" (with Dirty Money featuring Skylar Grey).

== Background ==
The song marks Diddy's first record to not be released by his label, Bad Boy Records, for which he was the flagship artist and founder. After a lukewarm commercial and critical response from his previous decade of material, the song finds Diddy in a less-braggadocious state of vulnerability as he laments on unrequited love. According to Diddy, he co-wrote the song with Tiller to help both of them move on during a period when they each were moving on from failed relationships. Tiller, however, claims the song was originally written and recorded by him c. 2018, and his brother mistakenly sent the song to Diddy in 2022, which led to their collaboration.

== Remixes ==
The song spawned three official remixes with varying guest performers and producers, including City Girls, Ashanti, Fabolous, and Cool & Dre. The remix with former two was titled the "Queens Mix."

== Charts ==
Chart performance for "Gotta Move On"
Chart (2023)	Peak position
US Adult R&B Airplay	1
US Billboard Hot 100	79
US Hot R&B/Hip-Hop Songs (Billboard)	24
US Rhythmic Airplay (Billboard)	15
US R&B Digital Song Sales	7

== Release history ==
Release history for "Gotta Move On"
Region	Date	Format	Label	Ref.
Various	June 17, 2022	Digital download; streaming	Love Records; Motown	
