= Jozzy =

American songwriter

- Jozzy in 2023

Background information
- Born: Jocelyn Adriene Donald; January 25, 1991 (age 35); Memphis, Tennessee, U.S.
- Genres: R&B; pop; hip hop
- Occupations: Singer; songwriter; record producer
- Years active: 2015–present
- Labels: Roc Nation; Motown; Love; Columbia

Jocelyn Adriene Donald (born January 25, 1991), better known by her stage name Jozzy, is an American songwriter and singer. She is best known for co-writing the Billy Ray Cyrus remix of Lil Nas X's 2019 single "Old Town Road", which peaked atop the Billboard Hot 100 for a record-breaking 19 weeks. Her other credits include the top ten singles "Lemonade" by Internet Money and "Mr. Right Now" by 21 Savage and Metro Boomin, as well as "Virgo's Groove" by Beyoncé, "Low" by SZA, and "You" by Jacquees, among others.

In May 2022, Jozzy signed with Sean Combs's record label Love Records, an imprint of Motown, becoming its only signee. During her time on the label, she released her debut extended play (EP), Songs for Women, Free Game for N****s EP, in 2023. As a recording artist, she has collaborated with artists such as Diddy, Lil Wayne, Lecrae, Black Coffee, Pharrell Williams, Schoolboy Q, and Sophie. She has also received accolades for her work with other artists, including three Grammy Award nominations.

== Discography ==
=== Studio albums ===
List of studio albums, with selected chart positions, sales figures and certifications
| 2026 | Soundtrack 2 Get Her Back: Released: March 27, 2026; RIAA certification: -; Chart positions: - |

=== Extended plays ===
List of extended plays, with selected chart positions, sales figures and certifications
| 2023 | Songs for Women, Free Game for N****s EP: Released: 2023; RIAA certification: -; Chart positions: - |

=== Guest appearances ===
List of guest appearances, with other performing artists, showing year released and album name
| Title | Year | Other performer(s) | Album |
|---|---|---|---|
| "Sucka Free" | 2020 | Lil Wayne | Non-album single |
| "Saturday Night" | 2020 | Lecrae | Restoration |
| "10 Missed Calls" | 2021 | Black Coffee, Pharrell Williams | Subconsciously |
| "Homecoming" | 2023 | Diddy | The Love Album: Off the Grid |
| "Lost Times" | 2024 | Schoolboy Q | Blue Lips |
| "Rawwwwww" | 2024 | Sophie | Sophie |
| "Fish N Steak (What It Is)" | 2026 | ASAP Rocky, Tyler, the Creator | Don't Be Dumb |

== Songwriting and production credits ==
Credits are courtesy of Discogs, Tidal, Apple Music, and AllMusic.

| Title | Year | Artist | Album |
|---|---|---|---|
| "Code Red" (featuring Missy Elliott & Laiyah) | 2015 | Monica | Code Red |
| "Just Right for Me" (featuring Lil Wayne) | 2015 | Monica | Code Red |
| "Love Just Ain't Enough" (featuring Timbaland) | 2015 | Monica | Code Red |
| "Call My Name" | 2015 | Monica | Code Red |
| "Deep" | 2015 | Monica | Code Red |
| "Suga" | 2015 | Monica | Code Red |
| "Discover" | 2015 | Chris Brown | Royalty |
| "M.I.L.F. $" | 2016 | Fergie | Double Dutchess |
| "Mamacita" (featuring Rico Nasty) | 2017 | Lil Yachty | The Fate of the Furious: The Album |
| "Ooh La La" | 2018 | Tinashe | Joyride |
| "Welcome to the Party" (featuring Zhavia Ward) | 2018 | Diplo, French Montana & Lil Pump | Deadpool 2 (Original Motion Picture Soundtrack) |
| "Ride It" | 2018 | Jeremih & Ty Dolla Sign | MihTy |
| "Old Town Road (Remix)" (featuring Billy Ray Cyrus) | 2019 | Lil Nas X | 7 |
| "Body" | 2019 | Summer Walker | Over It |
| "Pass Me By" | 2019 | Dinah Jane | Dinah Jane 1 |
| "Lemonade" (featuring Gunna, Don Toliver, & Nav) | 2020 | Internet Money | B4 the Storm and Demons Protected by Angels |
| "Holiday" | 2020 | Lil Nas X | Non-album single |
| "Mr. Right Now" (featuring Drake) | 2020 | 21 Savage & Metro Boomin | Savage Mode II |
| "Throw It Away" | 2021 | Summer Walker | Still Over It |
| "Bounce Back" | 2021 | Little Mix | Between Us |
| "Fast Lane" | 2021 | Don Toliver, Lil Durk & Latto | F9: The Fast Saga (Original Motion Picture Soundtrack) |
| "Double Standards" | 2021 | Don Toliver | Life of a Don |
| "Virgo's Groove" | 2022 | Beyoncé | Renaissance |
| "777 Pt. 1" | 2022 | Latto | 777 |
| "It's Givin" | 2022 | Latto | 777 |
| "Stepper" (featuring Nardo Wick) | 2022 | Latto | 777 |
| "Sleep Sleep" | 2022 | Latto | 777 |
| "Real One" | 2022 | Latto | 777 |
| "Love Will Never" | 2022 | Mary J. Blige | Good Morning Gorgeous |
| "Come See About Me" | 2022 | Mary J. Blige | Good Morning Gorgeous |
| "On Top" (featuring Fivio Foreign) | 2022 | Mary J. Blige | Good Morning Gorgeous |
| "Failing in Love" | 2022 | Mary J. Blige | Good Morning Gorgeous |
| "Come See About Me" (featuring Fabolous) | 2022 | Mary J. Blige | Good Morning Gorgeous |
| "Overthinking" (with 24kGoldn) | 2022 | Mabel | About Last Night... |
| "Low" | 2022 | SZA | SOS |
| "Water (Drowning Pt. 2)" (featuring Kodak Black) | 2022 | A Boogie wit da Hoodie | Me vs. Myself |
| "On Time" (with John Legend) | 2022 | Metro Boomin | Heroes & Villains |
| "Pray It Away" | 2023 | Chlöe | In Pieces |
| "NRH" | 2023 | 6lack | Since I Have a Lover |
| "Annihilate" (with Swae Lee, Lil Wayne, & Offset) | 2023 | Metro Boomin | Metro Boomin Presents Spider-Man: Across the Spider-Verse (Soundtrack from and Inspired by the Motion Picture) |
| "Take It to the Top" (with Becky G & Ayra Starr) | 2023 | Metro Boomin | Metro Boomin Presents Spider-Man: Across the Spider-Verse (Soundtrack from and Inspired by the Motion Picture) |
| "Georgia Peach" | 2024 | Latto | Sugar Honey Iced Tea |
| "Settle Down" | 2024 | Latto | Sugar Honey Iced Tea |
| "Good 2 You" (featuring Ciara) | 2024 | Latto | Sugar Honey Iced Tea |
| "Look What You Did" (featuring Mariah the Scientist) | 2024 | Latto | Sugar Honey Iced Tea |
| "Favorite" (featuring Jeremih) | 2024 | Chloë | Trouble in Paradise |
| "Breathing" (featuring Fabolous) | 2024 | Mary J. Blige | Gratitude |
| "Final Destination" | 2025 | Teyana Taylor | Escape Room |
| "Horoscope" | 2026 | Ari Lennox | Vacancy |
| "Truce" | 2026 | Jai'Len Josey | Serial Romantic |

== Awards and nominations ==
| Year | Awarding Body | Award | Result | Ref |
|---|---|---|---|---|
| 2020 | 62nd Annual Grammy Awards | Grammy Award for Record of the Year ("Old Town Road") | Nominated | |
| 2022 | BMI R&B/Hip-Hop Awards | Most Performed Songs Of The Year ("Lemonade") | Won | |
| 2022 | SOCAN Songwriting Awards | Rap Music Awards ("Lemonade") | Won | |
| 2023 | 65th Annual Grammy Awards | Grammy Award for Album of the Year (Renaissance) | Nominated | |
| 2023 | 65th Annual Grammy Awards | Grammy Award for Album of the Year (Good Morning Gorgeous) | Nominated | |
