= The Love Album: Off the Grid =

2023 studio album by Diddy

Studio album by Diddy
- Released: September 15, 2023
- Genre: R&B
- Length: 93:16
- Labels: Love; Stem
- Producers: Roark Bailey; Stevie J; Babyface; Big White; BNJMN; BongoByTheWay; Austin Brown; Zac Brunson; Darhyl Camper Jr.; DaHeala; Damn James; Diddy; Dinuzzo; D'Mile; Larrance Dopson; Ghost Kid; Dylan Graham; Quintin "Q" Gulledge; Eric Hudson; Infamous; Chaz Jackson; J Dilla; Peter Lee Johnson; Key Wane; Rob Knox; The Kount; Lil Cobaine; Lil Rod Madeit; Aaron Lindsey; Brian London; London on da Track; Metro Boomin; Thomas Lumpkins; The Stereotypes; Nova Wav; Oz; Monica Paez; Aaron Parrish; Chris Payton; Phil the Keys; Mick Schultz; Slimwav; Tariq; DeForrest Taylor; Timbaland; Ty Dolla Sign; Federico Vindver; Remey Williams; Mario Winans

Diddy chronology
MMM (Money Making Mitch) (2015)	The Love Album: Off the Grid (2023)

Singles from The Love Album: Off the Grid
- 1. "Another One of Me" Released: September 15, 2023

The Love Album: Off the Grid is the fifth and final studio album by American rapper and record producer Sean "Diddy" Combs. The album was released on September 15, 2023. Combs signed with the record label Motown in late 2022 to release its bonus tracks, "Gotta Move On" and "Sex In the Porsche", and in 2023, the album's only single, "Another One of Me". Despite this, the album was self-released by Combs' Love Records, becoming his only project to not be released by any major label, or Bad Boy Records. It is Combs's first solo album since 2006's Press Play, and his first project following the 2015 mixtape MMM (Money Making Mitch), which was credited to "Puff Daddy". Two months following its release, he was subject to numerous allegations of sexual misconduct, which overshadowed the album's promotion.

It includes guest appearances from The-Dream, Herb Alpert, Nova Wav, Busta Rhymes, Dawn Richard, Kalenna, Nija, Jozzy, Jacquees, Fabolous, Swae Lee, Summer Walker, The Weeknd, French Montana, 21 Savage, Justin Bieber, Jazmine Sullivan, Ty Dolla Sign, Kehlani, Coco Jones, Kalan.FrFr, K-Ci, Jeremih, Mary J. Blige, Teyana Taylor, Burna Boy, Babyface, John Legend, and H.E.R. The extended version contains additional guest appearances from Bryson Tiller, PartyNextDoor, and Metro Boomin. Production was handled by a variety of record producers, such as Combs, Nova Wav, Ty Dolla Sign, and Metro Boomin themselves, alongside Stevie J, Timbaland, London on da Track, J Dilla, D'Mile, OZ, the Stereotypes, Mick Schultz, and DaHeala, among others.

Upon its release, the album received polarizing reviews from music critics. Commercially, the album charted at number 19 on the Billboard 200 and peaked within the top 10 of the Independent Albums and Top R&B/Hip-Hop Albums charts in the United States. The album also made charts in Canada, Switzerland, and the United Kingdom. Though "Another One of Me" was its only official single, "Gotta Move On" and a remix of Metro Boomin's song "Creepin'" were included on the album's deluxe edition. The former topped the Adult R&B Airplay charts, while the latter topped numerous other charts worldwide.

== Background ==
Sean "Diddy" Combs released a four-minute trailer for the album on August 22, 2023, which included the names of some of the featured artists, such as Justin Bieber, Swae Lee, Mary J. Blige, Babyface, Jozzy, Yung Miami, French Montana, DJ Khaled, Teyana Taylor, the Weeknd and 21 Savage, among others. A press release called the album "a journey of retreating from the craziness of the world with a partner by shutting out all the distractions to just love on one another".

Combs proclaimed that the "era of love is here" and "R&B is back" alongside the announcement, and touted the album as containing the "last collab" of Canadian singer the Weeknd's career on "Another One of Me", due to the singer stating that he would no longer feature on other artists' songs. This proved untrue when in 2024 the Weeknd appeared on multiple tracks released by Future and Metro Boomin. The song is also a collaboration with Moroccan-American rapper French Montana and features Atlanta-based rapper 21 Savage and was released as the lead and only single from the album on the same day of its release.

== Critical reception ==
Professional ratings
Review scores
Source	Rating
AllMusic	3.5/5 stars
The Guardian	3/5 stars
HipHopDX	3.5/5 stars
The Times	2/5 stars

The album received polarizing reviews by critics. Reviewing the album for The Guardian, Rachel Aroesti wrote that Diddy "hasn't lost his knack for novelty" but "you inevitably find yourself searching for his vocal presence among the lush, swirling R&B", which "all adds up to an oddly dissatisfying return".

== Commercial performance ==
In the United States, The Love Album: Off the Grid debuted at number 19 on the Billboard 200 and sold 30,000 album-equivalent units in its first week. The album debuted at number 5 on the Top R&B/Hip-Hop Albums, marking Diddy's fifth top ten on the chart. The album would later peak at number 4 on the Independent Albums chart. By the end of the year, the album was positioned at number 94 on the Top R&B/Hip-Hop Albums chart.

In the United Kingdom, the album debuted at number 33 on the UK Album Downloads Chart on September 22, 2023. It would later peak at number 20 on the UK R&B Albums chart. In Canada, the album charted at number 56 on the Canadian Albums chart. In Switzerland, the album charted at number 57 on the Swiss Albums Chart.

== Track listing ==
The Love Album: Off the Grid track listing
No.	Title	Writer(s)	Producer(s)	Length
1.	"Brought My Love" (featuring The-Dream and Herb Alpert)	Sean Combs; Terius Gesteedle-Diamant; Steven Jordan; Mario Winans	Diddy; Stevie J; Winans	3:18
2.	"What's Love" (with Nova Wav)	Sean Combs; Brittany Coney; Denisia Andrews; Carlos Coleman; Jeremy Reeves; Jonathan Yip; Ray Romulus; Ray Charles McCullough II	Diddy; Nova Wav; The Stereotypes; Stevie J	3:14
3.	"Deliver Me" (performed by Diddy – Dirty Money featuring Busta Rhymes)	Sean Combs; Dawn Richard; Kaleena Harper; Trevor Smith	Diddy; Stevie J; J Dilla; Lil Rod Madeit	3:19
4.	"Stay Awhile" (with Nija)	Sean Combs; Nija Charles; Jordan; Coleman; DeForrest Taylor; Fletcher Redd	Diddy; Stevie J; Lil Rod Madeit	2:35
5.	"Homecoming" (with Jozzy)	Sean Combs; Jocelyn Donald; Andre Harris; Coleman; Roark Bailey; Chaz Jackson	Diddy; Stevie J; Bailey; Jackson; Lil Rod Madeit	3:24
6.	"Pick Up" (with Jacquees featuring Fabolous)	Sean Combs; Rodriquez Broadnax; John Jackson; Uforo Ebong; Bailey; Dylan Graham; Quintin Gulledge; John Conception; Benjamin Singh-Reynolds; Tariq	Diddy; BongoByTheWay; Bailey; Graham; Q; Big White; BNJMN; Tariq	4:07
7.	"Tough Love" (featuring Swae Lee)	Sean Combs; Khalif Brown; Ozan Yildirim; Aaron Cheung	Diddy; Oz; Aaron Paris; Winans; Federico Vindver; Bailey; Monica Paez; The Kount; Phil the Keys	4:22
8.	"Stay Long" (with Summer Walker)	Sean Combs; Summer Walker; London Holmes; Timothy Mosley; Remey Williams; Eric Bellinger; Bailey; Jerome Monroe	Diddy; London on da Track; Timbaland; Williams; Slimwav	2:25
9.	"It Belongs to You" (with Jozzy)	Sean Combs; Donald	Diddy; London on da Track; Bailey; Williams; Slimwav	2:37
10.	"Another One of Me" (with the Weeknd and French Montana featuring 21 Savage)	Sean Combs; Abel Tesfaye; Karim Kharbouch; Shéyaa Abraham-Joseph; Coleman; Ebong; Jason Quenneville; Eric Hudson; Bailey; D. Taylor	Diddy; BongoByTheWay; DaHeala; Hudson; Bailey; D. Taylor	4:46
11.	"Intermission (Side B)"	Combs	Diddy; Slim Wav	2:39
12.	"Moments" (featuring Justin Bieber)	Sean Combs; Justin Bieber; Rob Knox; Larrance Dopson	Diddy; Knox; Dopson; Winans; Stevie J; D'Mile; Vindver; Jackson; Chris Payton; Bailey; Slimwav	4:33
13.	"Need Somebody" (with Jazmine Sullivan)	Sean Combs; Jazmine Sullivan; Dwane Weir II	Diddy; Key Wane; Winans; D'Mile; Bailey; Slimwav; Lil Rod Madeit	4:18
14.	"Bosses in Love" (with Nova Wav)	Sean Combs; Coney; Andrews; Bailey; Monroe	Diddy; Winans; Bailey; Slimwav; Ghost Kid	0:53
15.	"Mind Your Business" (with Kehlani and Ty Dolla Sign)	Sean Combs; Kehlani Parrish; Tyrone Griffin Jr.; Bailey; Monroe	Diddy; Winans; Bailey; Slimwav; Ghost Kid	4:51
16.	"Nasty" (interlude; featuring Jozzy)	Donald	Diddy; Stevie J; Zac Brunson	1:40
17.	"Reachin'" (featuring Ty Dolla Sign and Coco Jones)	Sean Combs; Griffin; Courtney Jones; Jahron Brathwaite; Jordan; James Royo; Peter Lee Johnson; Cayman Cline; Lydia Asrat	Diddy; Ty Dolla Sign; Stevie J; Lil Rod Madeit; Bailey; Damn James; Johnson; Lil Cobaine	3:10
18.	"Stay Part 1" (with Kalan.FrFr and K-Ci featuring Jeremih)	Sean Combs; Kalan Montgomery; Cedric Hailey; Jeremy Felton; Coleman; Jackson; D. Taylor; Darrien Overton	Diddy; Jackson; D. Taylor; Lil Rod Madeit; Dinuzzo	3:36
19.	"I Like" (with Mary J. Blige)	Sean Combs; Jordan; Jackson; Coleman; Nash	Diddy; Stevie J; Jackson	3:44
20.	"Closer to God" (featuring Teyana Taylor)	Sean Combs; Teyana Taylor; Stacy Barthe; Austin Brown; Brian London; Thomas Lumpkins; Taylor	Diddy; D'Mile; Brown; London; Lumpkins; Bailey; D. Taylor; Aaron Lindsey	4:04
21.	"Boohoo" (featuring Jeremih)	Sean Combs; Felton; Mick Schultz	Diddy; Schultz	3:09
22.	"Burna Boy Interlude" (with Burna Boy)	Damini Ogulu	Diddy	1:03
23.	"Kim Porter" (with Babyface featuring John Legend)	Sean Combs; Kenneth Edmonds III; Darhyl Camper Jr.; Mosley; Bailey	Diddy; Camper; Timbaland; Bailey	7:17
24.	"Space" (with H.E.R.)	Sean Combs; Gabriella Wilson; Marco Rodriguez-Diaz Jr.; Bailey	Diddy; Infamous; Bailey	5:55
Total length:				93:16

Extended bonus tracks
No.	Title	Writer(s)	Producer(s)	Length
25.	"Gotta Move On" (featuring Bryson Tiller)	Sean Combs; Bryson Tiller; Travis Walton; Bailey; Monroe; Kentaro Kawamura; Olubowale Akintimehin; Joshua Huizar	Diddy; Teddy Walton; Bailey; Slimwav; J-Louis; RNSOM	2:40
26.	"Sex in the Porsche" (with PartyNextDoor)	Sean Combs; Brathwaite; Christopher Wallace; Coleman; Carl Thompson; Norman A. Glover; Reginald D. Ellis; Jordan; Bailey; Monroe; Nyan Lieberthal	Diddy; Stevie J; Bailey; Slimwav; Nyan	3:34
27.	"Creepin'" (remix; with Metro Boomin and the Weeknd featuring 21 Savage)	Sean Combs; Leland Wayne; Tesfaye; Abraham-Joseph; Quenneville; Johnson; Johan Lenox; Winans; Eithne Ní Bhraonáin; Erick Sermon; Parrish Smith; Chauncey Hawkins; Michael Jones; Nicky Ryan; Roma Ryan	Metro Boomin; DaHeala; Johnson; Lenox	3:52
Total length:				103:22

== Charts ==
=== Weekly charts ===
Weekly chart performance for The Love Album: Off the Grid
Chart (2023)	Peak position
Canadian Albums (Billboard)	56
Swiss Albums (Schweizer Hitparade)	57
UK Album Downloads (Official Charts)	33
UK R&B Albums (Official Charts)	20
US Billboard 200	19
US Independent Albums (Billboard)	4
US Top R&B/Hip-Hop Albums (Billboard)	5

=== Year-end charts ===
Year-end chart performance for The Love Album: Off the Grid
Chart (2023)	Position
US Top R&B/Hip-Hop Albums (Billboard)	94
