= Code Red (Monica album) =

Studio album by Monica
- Released: December 18, 2015
- Studios: Glenwood Place Studios (Burbank, California); Dream Asylum Studios (Hallandale Beach, Florida); Music Box Studios, PatchWerk Studios, Top 40 Studios (Atlanta, Georgia); 6AM Studios (Chicago, Illinois); Jungle City Studios (New York City)
- Genre: R&B
- Length: 52:30
- Label: RCA
- Producers: Polow da Don; Nick Brongers; Danja; Fatboi; DJ HardWork; Daniel Jones; KEYZBABY; Pop & Oak; Jonathan "Anonymous" Solone-Myvett; Timbaland

Monica chronology
New Life (2012)	Code Red (2015)

Singles from Code Red
- 1. "Just Right for Me" Released: May 4, 2015

Code Red is the eighth studio album by American singer Monica. It was released on December 18, 2015, by RCA Records and coincided with the twentieth release anniversary of her debut album Miss Thang (1995). For the project, Monica reteamed with her cousin Polow da Don, who had co-executive produced her previous album New Life (2012). The pair enlisted a variation of producers and songwriters to work with her, including Danja, DJ HardWork, Fatboi, KEYZBABY, Pop & Oak, and Timbaland – in addition to longtime collaborators such as performers Missy Elliott and Akon, and songwriters Crystal Nicole and Johntá Austin.

Upon its release, Code Red received generally mixed reviews from most music critics. The album debuted at number 27 on the US Billboard 200 chart, selling 35,656 copies in its first week, becoming Monica's lowest-charting debut since her first album. Leading single "Just Right for Me," a collaboration with Lil Wayne reached number twelve on the US Billboard Adult R&B Songs chart but failed to impact elsewhere, resulting in lackluster sales in general and the release of no further singles. In support of the album, Monica embarked on her first solo concert tour in years, The Code Red Experience to promote Code Red.

== Background ==
In October 2012, only six months after releasing her previous album New Life, Monica confirmed on Twitter that she was in the very early stages of her eighth album and was having meetings with RCA Records CEO Peter Edge while staying in New York City. Following New Life's moderate commercial success, Monica felt that she was distancing herself from younger music listeners and that the album, while neither specifically recorded for her core audience nor urban adult contemporary, had failed to connect with a more influential audience. Initial plans for Code Red had her working with frequent collaborators such as Missy Elliott, Rico Love, Jim Jonsin, Polow da Don, Stargate but also new contributors, including Red Styles and Mike Will Made It, to create a "fresh sound."

In September 2013, Monica gave birth to her third child, Laiyah Shannon Brown, her first child with NBA player Shannon Brown. While she mostly cared for Laiyah, she soon resumed recording. In early 2015, the singer expressed dissatisfaction with contemporary R&B radio. She intended Code Red to help change that status, commenting, "Right now for R&B music, there's a state of emergency. Myself being one person, one artist, I can't change that on my own. No one is that powerful, but all of us together, I think we can make huge strides, allowing this generation to enjoy what this music embodies, which is a lot of love, passion, soul." In an interview with online music magazine Singersroom, she further elaborated, that "Code Red is just my way of saying let's bring attention to the music. I love the music today, but I think it's important to get back to music that touched our hearts. Let's get back to the soul of R&B music. So I'm saying that this is a part of my fight, the continuation of making great music."

== Songs ==
Code Red opens with its title track, an aggressive uptempo dance song that features guest vocals by longtime collaborator Missy Elliott as well as a cameo from Monica's daughter Laiyah. According to Monica, it was inspired by "the sound that lived in Atlanta, especially in the 1990s." Lyrically, the song sees Monica and Elliott lamenting those artists who are out chasing hits, leading to the genre's lack of creativity and diversity. "Just Right for Me" is a hip hop-infused soul track with a thick drum arrangement that jumbles a sample from The Miracles' "Much Better Off" (1968). Musically, it follows previous retro-soul singles such as "So Gone" and "Everything to Me". "Just Right for Me" marked Monica's first collaboration with rapper and feature Lil Wayne. "Love Just Ain’t Enough," a duet with Timbaland, is a soulful mid-tempo soap opera led by a snap beat. "Call My Name" opens with a self-recorded portion from "A Dream Is a Wish Your Heart Makes", a song written for Walt Disney's Cinderella (1950). On the uplifting ballad, Monica suspects her lover of cheating, asking him to call her name.

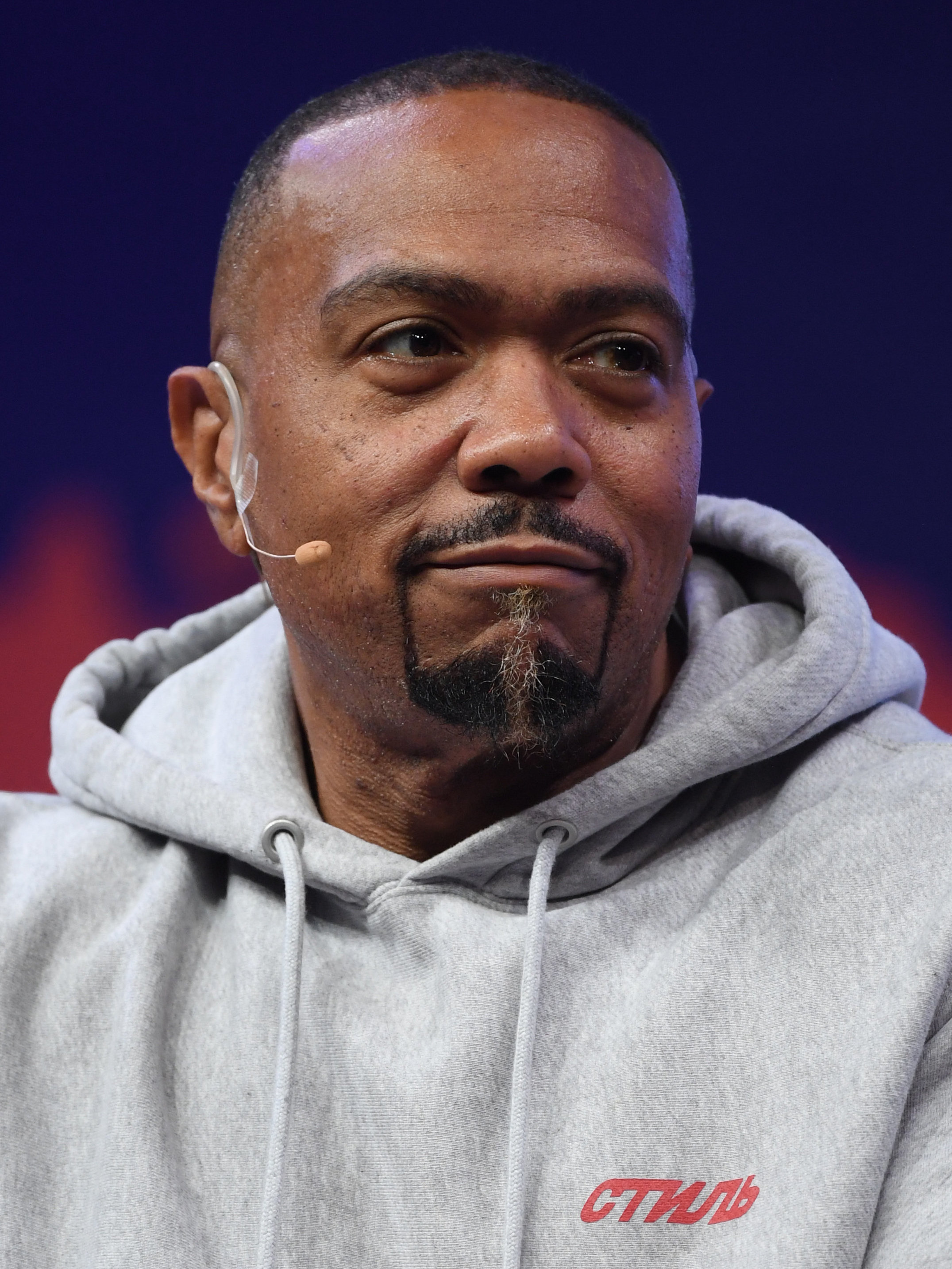
Timbaland (pictured) co-wrote and features on two tracks on Code Red.

Supported by piano and reverb, Monica pledges her love and loyalty on the stripped-back "I Know", a heartfelt ballad in which she sings about leaving emotional baggage behind while getting into a new relationship. On "All Men Lie", another duet sung and written by Timbaland, Monica insists that all men are the same. Led by a mix of big horns and hip-hop sensibility it follows an experimental melancholy. "Deep," an ode to Shannon Brown that was produced by Danja and Polow da Don, is a luminous ballad that takes on an edgier tone as the singer talks about falling in love. "Hustler's Ambition" features singer Akon and tells the tale of distanced but committed love between a criminal and his woman over Latin-inspired instrumentals and soft singing.

"Alone in Your Heart," a pop-soul belter, samples from Harold Melvin & the Blue Notes' "Stay Together" (1977). Monica compared it to her songs "Before You Walk Out of My Life" (1995) and "Angel of Mine" (1998). "Suga" has been described as an '90s-oriented, "electro/freestyle hybrid," that contains a portion of American singer Teena Marie's "Behind the Groove" (1980). On "Ocean of Tears," gritty urban meets smooth soul 1990s music. According to Monica, the song displays "how you feel when you’re connected to someone that’s just not treating you the way you should be treated." Inspirational, heartfelt ballad "Saints & Sinners" strips down technical gimmickry, showcasing Monica's faith. "I Miss Music" is a wistful ballad that blends mid-1990s adult contemporary with alternative singer-songwriter material. Lyrically, the song is a gently nostalgic reminiscence-cum-complaint about the lasting value of music in which Monica sings about Stevie Wonder, Lauryn Hill, Michael Jackson, and Kurt Cobain. Code Red closes with the lush ballad "Anchor," a touching declaration of support.

== Release and promotion ==
A release date for Monica's eighth studio album was first suggested in October 2013, when Monica expressed her intention of releasing it in late 2014. In January 2015, the singer took to her Instagram page to announce that the title of the album would be Code Red, when she posted a photo of a red bar code above the title that read "#AlbumComingSoon #CodeRed." In an interview with American hip-hop DJ Smallz, released on YouTube on July 29, 2015, Monica announced that Code Red would be released on September 18, 2015. The album's original release date was preceded by a private listening party at the PatchWerk Recording Studios in West Midtown in Atlanta on August 27. Attendees included Monica's then-husband Shannon Brown, producer Polow da Don, and rappers Young Jeezy, and Kap G.

However, though recording sessions for the album were concluded, it was soon bumped to October 2 and eventually pushed to TBA status again. Commenting on this decision, Monica cited promotional reasons as a major reason for delay and wrote on Instagram that "it was a very hard decision to push this album date back. The music is ready and the label was ready to drop it immediately [...] My love for the people and my connection to them made me want to reach them. Get out on the road and go places many pass by". A month later, in anticipation of her upcoming album, she announced dates for The Code Red Experience, her first solo concert tour in years. Joined by special guest Rico Love, the 22-date venue started on November 12 in Las Vegas. On November 1, 2015, she announced through social media that the Code Red album would be released on December 18, and on November 19, she revealed its cover art and track listing. The next day, it was made available for pre-order.

=== Singles ===
"Just Right for Me", featuring guest vocals from rapper Lil Wayne was released as the lead single from Code Red. It premiered on Los Angeles radio station Power 106's programme Lift Off on May 18, 2015. Released on June 26, 2015, the song debuted at number 26 on the US Billboard Adult R&B Songs chart during the week of July 25, 2015, and peaked at number 12 on the chart. In the weeks leading up to the album's release, title track "Code Red" featuring Missy Elliott and vocals from Monica's daughter Laiyah, "Hustler's Ambition" featuring Akon, and the ballad "I Know" were released online. On January 15, 2016, Monica confirmed on Twitter that "Alone in Your Heart" would be released as the second single from Code Red but plans were eventually scrapped for unknown reasons.

== Critical response ==
Professional ratings
Review scores
Source	Rating
AllMusic	3/5 stars
Exclaim!	6/10
Knoxville News Sentinel	4/5 stars
Newsday	B+

Code Red received generally mixed reviews from music critics. Knoxville News Sentinel writer Chuck Campbell gave the album four stars out of five. While he complimented her collaborations with Lil Wayne, Elliott, and Timbaland, he stated that "Monica fares best on Code Red when she goes it alone at the microphone with her powerful pipes", making "a good case for reviving R&B with Code Red." Michael Arceneaux, writing for Ebony, declared Code Red "an enjoyable listen", praising it as "Monica’s best album in years, and a reminder that when you have a format that works for you, stick with it and stop swerving". He noted comparisons with Tamia's Love Life (2015), citing its undoubtedly "awareness of current trends, and in select cases on the album, offers a nod to them without going too far left." Newsday' Glenn Gamboa found that with Code Red, Monica raises "the flag for over-30 R&B lovers", spending "the rest of Code Red looking to give people something new to sing to. And that doesn’t mean just old-school soul".

In his mixed review, Jon Caramanica of The New York Times felt that the Code Red "manifests in the tension between traditionalist instincts and modern music-making imperatives". He also noted that its sound reflects "choices of an artist trying to thread several needles at once". Allmusic's Andy Kellman rated the album three ouf of five stars and summed it as "another Monica album that, at its best, draws from the past while remaining in the present [...] Subtract the mixed and muddled messages, and Code Red is satisfactory." He felt that "what truly distinguishes Code Red from the rest of Monica's albums is that the singer is credited as co-writer of every track. Unsurprisingly, she sounds completely connected to every song". Canadian music magazine Exclaim! summed that "Code Red is a well packaged collection of songs, but falls short on containing anything on the same calibre of Monica's iconic hit "The Boy Is Mine." L. Michael Gipson from SoulTracks called Code Red a "project that boasts strong vocals, but songs not always equal in memorability to the voice or to the fight to save more traditional R&B in the mainstream or commercial arena [...] As is usual in what determines an album's creative, if not always commercial success, it's still all about the songs, and there are only good, not great ones here. "

== Commercial performance ==
In the week of January 9, 2016, Code Red debuted at number four on the US Billboard's Top R&B/Hip-Hop Albums chart, and at number 27 on the Billboard 200 chart, with first week sales of 35,656 copies—half as much as her previous album, New Life (2012), which had first-week sales of 69,000 copies. However, this marked Monica's eighth top ten album in this country on the US Top R&B/Hip-Hop Albums charts. Billboard ranked it 52nd on his Top R&B/Hip-Hop Albums year-end chart.

== Track listing ==
Code Red track listing
No.	Title	Writer(s)	Producer(s)	Length
1.	"Code Red" (featuring Missy Elliott and Laiyah)	Monica Brown; Timothy Clayton; Jocelyn Donald; Melissa Elliott; Jamal Jones	Polow da Don; Blanco^{[C]}	4:24
2.	"Just Right for Me" (featuring Lil Wayne)	Brown; Dwayne Carter, Jr.; Donald; J. Jones; Warren "Pete" Moore; Smokey Robinson	Polow da Don; Blanco^{[C]}	3:20
3.	"Love Just Ain't Enough" (featuring Timbaland)	Brown; Nick Brongers; Donald; Kirby Lauryen; Timothy Mosley; Jonathan Solone-Myvett	Timbaland; Solone-Myvett^{A]}; Brongers^{[B]}; Blanco^{[C]}	3:22
4.	"Call My Name"	Brown; Donald; Daniel Jones; J. Jones; Lauryen; Mosley; Solone-Myvett	Timbaland; Polow da Don; Jones^{A]}; Blanco^{[C]}	4:13
5.	"I Know"	Brown; Philip Constable; Lindsay Gilbert	DJ HardWerk; Lindsay "Mavelle" Gilbert^{[C]}	3:18
6.	"All Men Lie" (featuring Timbaland)	Brown; Brongers; Lauryen; Mosley	Timbaland; Brongers^{[B]}; Blanco^{[C]}	2:32
7.	"Deep"	Brown; Marcella Araica; Donald; Nate Hills; J. Jones	Danja; Polow da Don	3:54
8.	"Hustler's Ambition" (featuring Akon)	Brown; Constable; Gilbert; Aliaume Thiam	Akon; DJ HardWerk; Lindsay "Mavelle" Gilbert^{[C]}	4:18
9.	"Alone in Your Heart"	Brown; Warren "Oak" Felder; Andrea Simms; Maidine HaHa; Andrew "Pop" Wansel	Pop & Oak	3:35
10.	"Suga"	Brown; Bennie Amey; Atia Boggs; Mary Brockert; Donald; J. Jones; Richard Rudolph	Polow da Don; Blanco^{[C]}	3:21
11.	"Ocean of Tears"	Brown; Constable; Crystal Nicole	DJ HardWerk; Nicole^{[C]}	3:56
12.	"Saints & Sinners"	Brown; Majubeen Abdullah; Johntá Austin; James Foye III; J. Jones	Polow da Don; KEYZBABY^{[B]}	4:03
13.	"I Miss Music"	Brown; Constable; Scott Effman; Gilbert; Priscilla Hamilton; Lukas Nathanson	DJ HardWerk; Gilbert^{[C]}	3:13
14.	"Anchor"	Brown; LaDamon Douglas; Tami Latrell; Jerome Simmons; Atozzio Towns; Michael White	Fatboi	5:01
Total length:				52:30

Notes

- ^{^[A]} denotes additional producer
- ^{^[B]} denotes co-producer
- ^{^[C]} denotes vocal producer

Sample credits

- "Just Right for Me" contains a sample from "Much Better Off", written by Warren "Pete" Moore and Smokey Robinson, performed by Smokey Robinson & the Miracles.
- "Call My Name" contains a sample of "A Dream Is a Wish Your Heart Makes", composed by Mack David, Al Hoffman and Jerry Livingston for the film Cinderella (1950).
- "Alone in Your Heart" contains a sample from "Stay Together" as performed by Harold Melvin & the Blue Notes.
- "Suga" contains a portion of "Behind the Groove", written by Teena Marie and Richard Rudolph, and performed by the former.

== Credits and personnel ==
Managerial

- Album producers – Monica, Melinda Dancil
- Executive producers – Monica, Polow da Don

Technical and production

- Recording – Chad Jolley, Chris Godbey, Chris King, Matt Weber, Oak, Roark Bailey
- Recording assistants – Perry Jimenez
- Mixing – Abel Garibaldi, Chris King, Leslie Brathwaite, Marcella Araica
- Mastering – Chris Athens

Visuals and imagery

- Art direction, design – Fusako Chubachi
- Creative direction – Erwin Gorostiza
- Photography – Tyler Kolhoff

== Charts ==
=== Weekly charts ===
Weekly chart performance for Code Red
Chart (2015)	Peak position
US Billboard 200	27
US Top R&B/Hip-Hop Albums (Billboard)	4

=== Year-end charts ===
Year-end chart performance for Code Red
Chart (2016)	Position
US Top R&B/Hip-Hop Albums (Billboard)	52

== Release history ==
Release dates and formats for Code Red
Region	Date	Format(s)	Label	Edition(s)	Ref.
Japan	December 18, 2015	CD; digital download	Sony	Standard	
United States	December 18, 2015	CD; digital download	RCA	Standard	
