= Sean Combs =

American rapper and producer (born 1969)

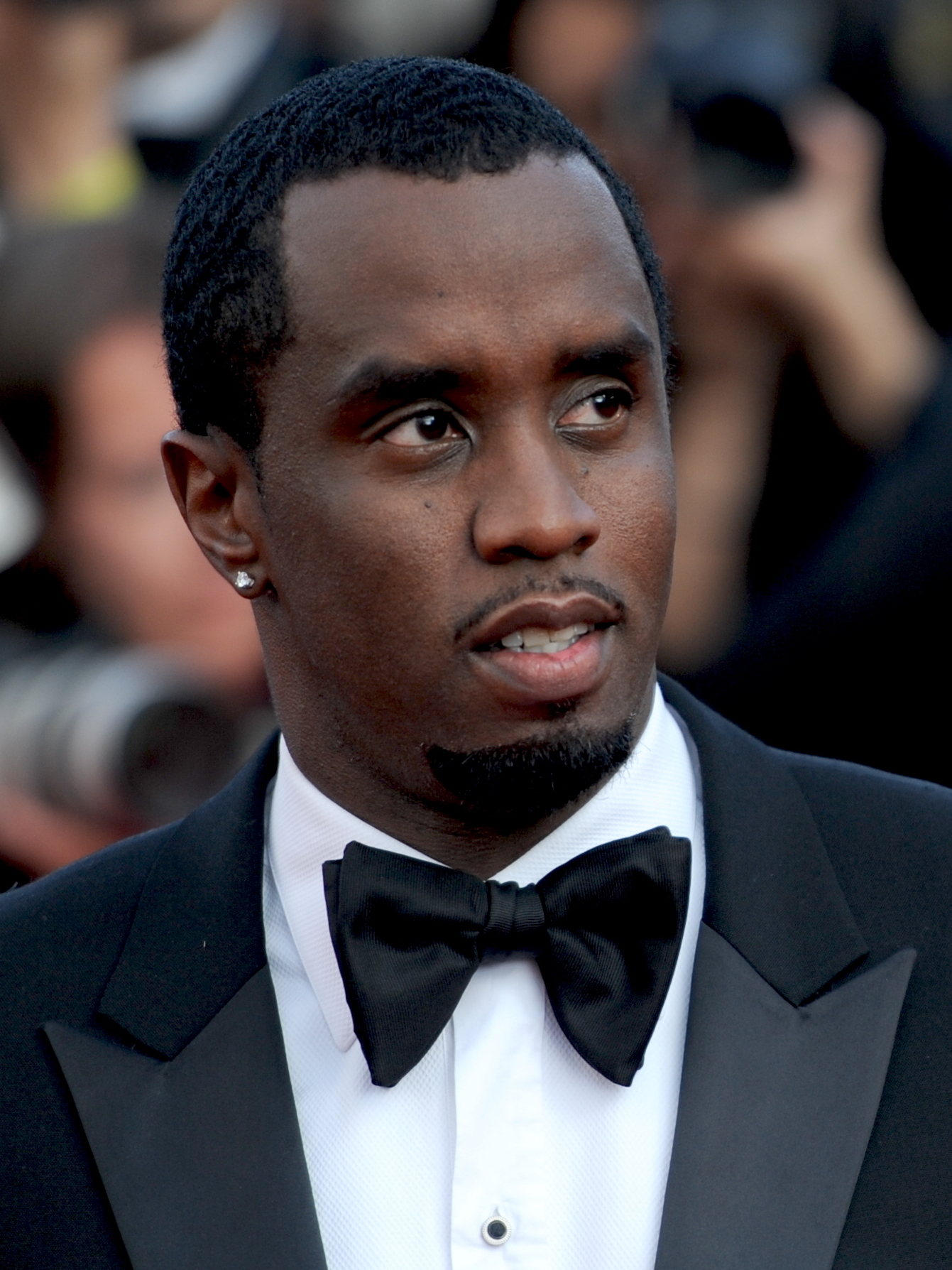
- Combs at the 2012 Cannes Film Festival
- Born: Sean John Combs; November 4, 1969 (age 57); New York City, U.S.
- Other names: Puffy; Puff; Puff Daddy; P. Diddy; Diddy; PD; Love; Brother Love
- Occupations: Rapper; songwriter; record producer; entrepreneur; record executive; television producer; actor; dancer
- Years active: 1990–2024
- Works: Discography; filmography; production
- Criminal charges: Transportation to engage in prostitution (2 counts)
- Criminal penalty: 50 months' incarceration (with time served) and $500,000 fine
- Criminal status: Incarcerated at Federal Correctional Institution, Allenwood Low
- Partners: Kimberly Porter (1994–2007); Jennifer Lopez (1999–2001); Cassie Ventura (2007–2018); Yung Miami (2021–2024)
- Children: 7, including Quincy, Justin, and King
- Awards: Full list
- Musical career
- Genres: East Coast hip-hop; R&B
- Labels: Arista; Atlantic; Bad Boy; BMG; Epic; Interscope; Love; Motown; Universal; Uptown
- Member of: The Hitmen
- Formerly of: Diddy – Dirty Money

Sean John Combs (born November 4, 1969), also known professionally as Diddy (formerly Puff Daddy and P. Diddy), is an American former rapper, record producer, record executive, and actor. He is credited with the discovery and development of musical artists such as the Notorious B.I.G., Mary J. Blige, and Usher, among others.

Born in Harlem, Combs worked as a talent director at Uptown Records before founding his own record label, Bad Boy Records, in 1993. Combs's debut studio album, No Way Out (1997), peaked atop the Billboard 200 and sold over 7 million copies in the US. Two of its singles, "Can't Nobody Hold Me Down" and "I'll Be Missing You", topped the Billboard Hot 100—the latter was the first hip-hop song to debut atop the chart. With his guest appearance on "Mo Money Mo Problems", Combs became the first solo artist to replace himself atop the chart. His second and third albums, Forever (1999) and The Saga Continues... (2001), both peaked at number two on the Billboard 200. The collaborative singles "Bump, Bump, Bump" (2002) and "Shake Ya Tailfeather" (2003) made him the first rapper with five US number-one singles. Following the release of his US chart-topping fourth album Press Play (2006), Combs formed the musical trio Diddy – Dirty Money with R&B singers Kalenna Harper and Dawn Richard to release the collaborative album Last Train to Paris (2010). His fifth album, The Love Album: Off the Grid (2023), was his first to be self-released.

One of the world's wealthiest musical artists, Combs topped Forbes annual hip-hop rich list in 2014 and 2017. His accolades include three Grammy Awards, three BET Awards and two MTV Video Music Awards. He has worked as a producer for other media, including the reality television series Making the Band, and he starred in the films Made, Monster's Ball (both 2001) and Get Him to the Greek (2010). Combs founded the clothing retailer Sean John in 1998, for which he won Menswear Designer of the Year from the Council of Fashion Designers of America in 2004, having previously been nominated in 2000. He served as brand ambassador for the liquor brand Cîroc from 2007 to 2023, and co-founded the digital television network Revolt in 2013. In 2008, Combs became the first male rapper to get a star on the Hollywood Walk of Fame.

In late 2023, Combs settled a high-profile sexual assault and abuse lawsuit filed by his former partner Cassie Ventura. Numerous lawsuits regarding sexual misconduct were filed in the following months, with several claimants alleging sexual assault and abuse by Combs between 1991 and 2009. In March 2024, several of Combs's properties were raided by the Department of Homeland Security, and that September he was charged with federal sex trafficking, transportation to engage in prostitution, and racketeering. He pleaded not guilty and was denied bail three times. His trial began on May 5, 2025; on July 2, he was found guilty of transportation to engage in prostitution, but not guilty on racketeering and sex trafficking charges. On October 3, 2025, Combs was sentenced to 50 months in prison with credit for 12 months time served. As of October 2026, he is incarcerated at the Federal Correctional Institution, Allenwood Low.

== Early life ==
Sean John Combs was born on November 4, 1969, in Harlem, New York City. His mother Janice Combs (née Smalls) worked as a model who organized fashion shows, and as a teacher's assistant. His father, Melvin Earl Combs, served in the U.S. Air Force, worked at a hair salon, and was an associate of convicted New York drug lord Frank Lucas. Melvin Combs probably began working part-time as a drug dealer around 1970. In 1972, at age 33, Melvin was shot dead while sitting in his car on Central Park West. According to a 2010 account by Vibe magazine, Melvin Combs was killed by Walter Grant, a fellow affiliate of mafia-supplied heroin dealer Willie Abraham; "Grant was convinced that Melvin had either ratted out his crew after his arrest—or planned to", although Lucas himself doubted that Combs had, in fact, revealed any information to law enforcement. Sean Combs was two years and two months old when his father died. Combs has a younger sister, Keisha, and grew up in poverty. Janice Combs and her children stayed in Upper Manhattan for "several years" after Melvin's death, before moving to Mount Vernon, which is an inner suburb of New York City, located just north of the Bronx.

Combs said he was given the nickname "Puff" as a child, because he would "huff and puff" when he was angry. Combs was raised Catholic and served as an altar boy. Sean Combs graduated in 1987 from Mount Saint Michael Academy, an all-boys Catholic school in the Bronx. He played on school football team that won a division title in 1986. In autumn 1987, Combs enrolled as a business major at Howard University, a historically black college in Washington, D.C., but he left after his second year. At college, Combs was known for throwing parties; three classmates also recalled him using a belt to beat his then-girlfriend outside her Harriet Tubman Quadrangle dormitory.

== Career ==
=== 1990–1996: Career beginnings ===
Combs became an intern at New York's Uptown Records in 1990. While working as a talent director at Uptown, under the guidance of label founder Andre Harrell, he helped develop Jodeci and Mary J. Blige. In his college days, Combs had a reputation for throwing parties, some of which attracted up to a thousand participants. Usher, who lived with Combs for a year in New York City when he was 13 years old, told Howard Stern in 2016 that Combs's lifestyle was "pretty wild" during that time. In 1991, Combs promoted an AIDS fundraiser with Heavy D held at the City College of New York (CCNY) gymnasium, following a charity basketball game. The event was oversold, and a stampede occurred in which nine people died.

Shortly after being fired from Uptown in 1993, Combs established his own label Bad Boy Records, which entered a joint venture deal with Arista Records. Combs brought Uptown signee Christopher Wallace (better known as the Notorious B.I.G.) along with him to the newly established label. Both Wallace and Craig Mack began recording for the label and yielded mainstream recognition, leading to the former's debut album and the label's first major project, Ready to Die (1994). Combs signed more acts to Bad Boy, including Carl Thomas, Faith Evans, 112, Total, and Father MC. The Hitmen, his in-house production team, worked with Jodeci, Mary J. Blige, Usher, Lil' Kim, TLC, Mariah Carey, Boyz II Men, SWV, Aretha Franklin, and others.

Mase and the Lox joined Bad Boy just as a widely publicized East Coast–West Coast hip-hop rivalry was beginning. Combs and Wallace were criticized and parodied by Death Row Records cohorts Tupac Shakur and Suge Knight in songs and interviews during the mid-1990s. During 1994–1995, Combs produced several songs for TLC's CrazySexyCool, which finished the decade as number 25 on Billboard's list of top pop albums of the decade.

=== 1996–1998: "Puff Daddy" and No Way Out ===
In 1996, under the name Puff Daddy, Combs released his first commercial vocal work as a rapper. His debut single, "Can't Nobody Hold Me Down", spent 28 weeks on the Billboard Hot 100 chart, peaking at number one. His debut album, No Way Out, was released on July 22, 1997, through Bad Boy Records. Originally titled Hell up in Harlem, the album underwent several changes after the Notorious B.I.G. was killed on March 9, 1997. Several of the label's artists made guest appearances on the album. No Way Out was a significant success, particularly in the United States, where it reached number one on the Billboard 200 in its first week of release, selling 561,000 copies.

The album produced five singles: "I'll Be Missing You", a tribute to the Notorious B.I.G., was the first rap song to debut at number one on the Billboard Hot 100; it remained at the top of the chart for 11 consecutive weeks and topped several other charts worldwide. Four other singles—"Can't Nobody Hold Me Down", "It's All About the Benjamins", "Been Around the World", and "Victory"—were also released. Combs collaborated with Jimmy Page on the song "Come with Me" for the 1998 film Godzilla.

The album earned Combs five nominations at the 40th Grammy Awards in 1998, and would go on to win the Grammy Award for Best Rap Album. On September 7, 2000, the album was certified septuple platinum by the Recording Industry Association of America for sales of over 7 million copies. By the late 1990s, he was being criticized for watering down and overly commercializing hip hop, and for relying excessively on guest appearances, samples, and interpolations of past hits. For example, in a 1997 review of No Way Out for Billboard, Havelock Nelson commented: "...the over-reliance on huge swathes of undiluted samples is simply clumsy, lazy, and demeaning to the sources." Also in 1997, Neil Strauss of The New York Times called Combs the "king of sampled hits".

=== 1999–2000: Forever ===
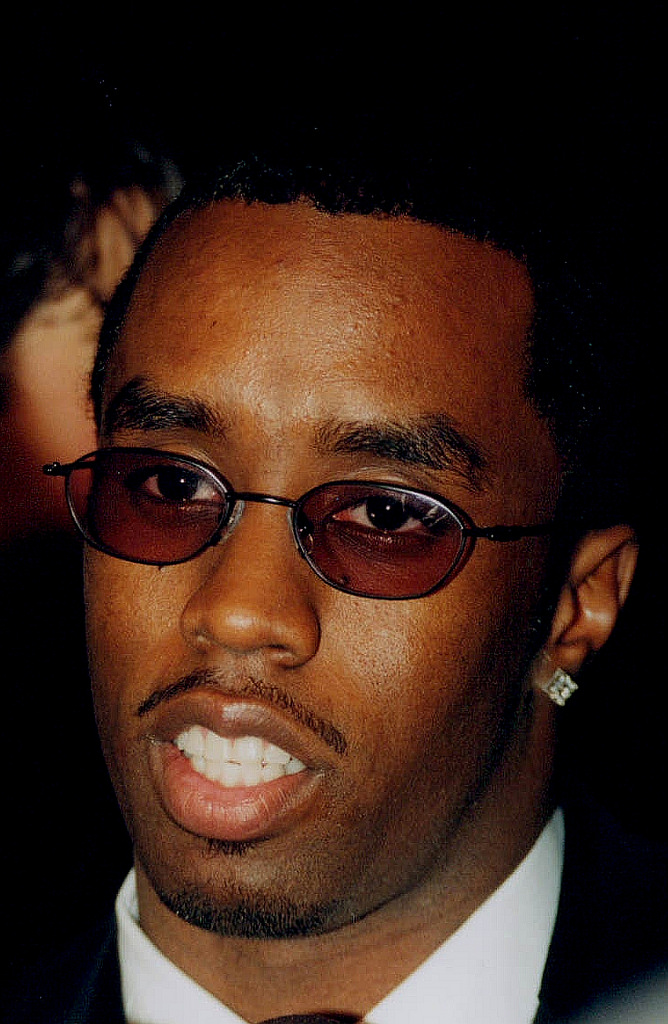
Combs at the Rock and Roll Hall of Fame in 2000

In April 1999, Combs was charged with assaulting Steve Stoute of Interscope Records. Stoute was the manager for Nas, with whom Combs had filmed a video earlier that year for the song "Hate Me Now". Combs was concerned that the video, which featured a shot of Nas and Combs being crucified, was blasphemous.

He asked for his scenes on the cross to be pulled, but after the video aired unedited on MTV on April 15, Combs visited Stoute's offices and injured Stoute.

Forever, Combs's second solo studio album, was released by Bad Boy Records on August 24, 1999, in North America, and in the UK on the following day. It reached number two on the Billboard 200 and number one on the Top R&B/Hip-Hop Albums chart, before being ousted the following week by Mary J. Blige's fourth album, Mary. The album received positive to mixed reviews from music critics and spawned three singles that have charted on the Billboard charts. It peaked at number four on the Canadian Albums Chart, Combs's highest-charting album in that country.

=== 2001–2004: "P. Diddy" and The Saga Continues ===
Combs changed his stage name from "Puff Daddy" to "P. Diddy" in 2001. The gospel album Thank You, which had been completed just before the beginning of the weapons trial, was due to be released in March that year, but remains unreleased as of 2023. He appeared as a drug dealer in the film Made, and starred with Halle Berry, Heath Ledger, and Billy Bob Thornton in Monster's Ball (both in 2001).

Combs began working with a series of atypical (for him) artists. For a short period of time, he was the manager of Kelis; they have a collaboration titled "Let's Get Ill". He was an opening act for NSYNC on their Spring 2002 Celebrity Tour, and he signed California-based pop girl group Dream to his record label. Combs was a producer of the soundtrack album for the film Training Day (2001).

The Saga Continues..., his third album, was released on July 10, 2001, in North America. The album reached number two on the Billboard 200 and the Top R&B/Hip-Hop Albums charts and was eventually certified Platinum. It is the only studio album under the P. Diddy name, and the first album by Sean Combs not to feature any guest appearances by Jay-Z or Lil' Kim. In June 2002, Combs ended Bad Boy's distribution deal with Arista Records, gaining full control of the label, its catalogue, and its roster of artists. Combs was executive producer of the reality TV show, Making the Band, which appeared on MTV from 2002 to 2009.

The show involves interviewing candidates and creating musical acts that would then enter the music business. Acts who got their start this way include Da Band, Danity Kane, Day26, and Donnie Klang. In 2003, Combs ran in the New York City Marathon, raising $2 million for the educational system of the city of New York. On March 10, 2004, he appeared on The Oprah Winfrey Show to discuss the marathon, which he finished in four hours and eighteen minutes. In 2004, Combs headed the campaign "Vote or Die" for the 2004 presidential election. On February 1, 2004, Combs performed at the Super Bowl XXXVIII halftime show.

=== 2005–2009: "Diddy" and Press Play ===
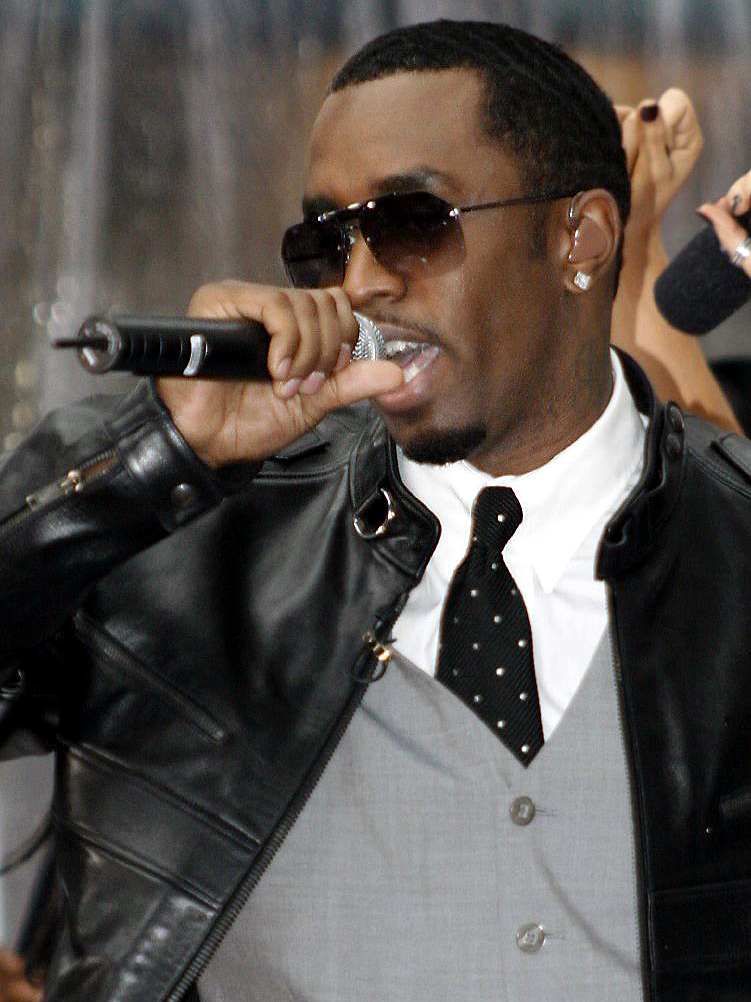
Combs performing at the Tribeca Film Festival in 2007

On August 16, 2005, Combs announced on Today that he was altering his stage name yet again; he would be calling himself "Diddy". Combs said fans did not know how to address him, which led to confusion.

Combs starred in the 2005 film Carlito's Way: Rise to Power. He played Walter Lee Younger in the 2004 Broadway revival of A Raisin in the Sun and the television adaptation that aired in February 2008. In 2005, Combs sold half of his record company to the Warner Music Group. He hosted the 2005 MTV Video Music Awards and was named one of the 100 Most Influential People of 2005 by Time magazine. He was mentioned in the country song "Play Something Country" by Brooks & Dunn: the lyricist says he "didn't come to hear P. Diddy", which is rhymed with "something thumpin' from the city".

In 2006, when Combs refused to release rapper Mase from his contractual obligations with Bad Boy to allow him to join the group G-Unit, 50 Cent recorded a diss song, "Hip-Hop". The lyrics imply that Combs knew the identity of the Notorious B.I.G.'s murderer. The two resolved the feud, but it resurfaced in later years.

Combs released his first album in four years, Press Play, on October 17, 2006, on the Bad Boy Records label. The album, featuring guest appearances by many popular artists, debuted at number one on the US Billboard 200 chart with sales of over 173,009. Its singles "Come to Me" and "Last Night" both reached the top ten of the Billboard Hot 100. The album became available to preview on MTV's The Leak on October 10, 2006, a week before being sold in stores. Press Play received mixed to positive reviews from critics, and was certified Gold on the RIAA ratings. On September 18, 2007, Combs teamed up with 50 Cent and Jay-Z for the "Forbes I Get Money Billion Dollar Remix".

In June 2008, Combs's representative denied rumors of another name change. Combs ventured into reality television in August 2008 with the premiere of his VH1 series I Want to Work for Diddy. He appeared—credited under his real name—in two episodes of Season 7 of CSI: Miami: "Presumed Guilty" and "Sink or Swim", in the role of lawyer Derek Powell.

=== 2010–2013: Diddy – Dirty Money and acting ===
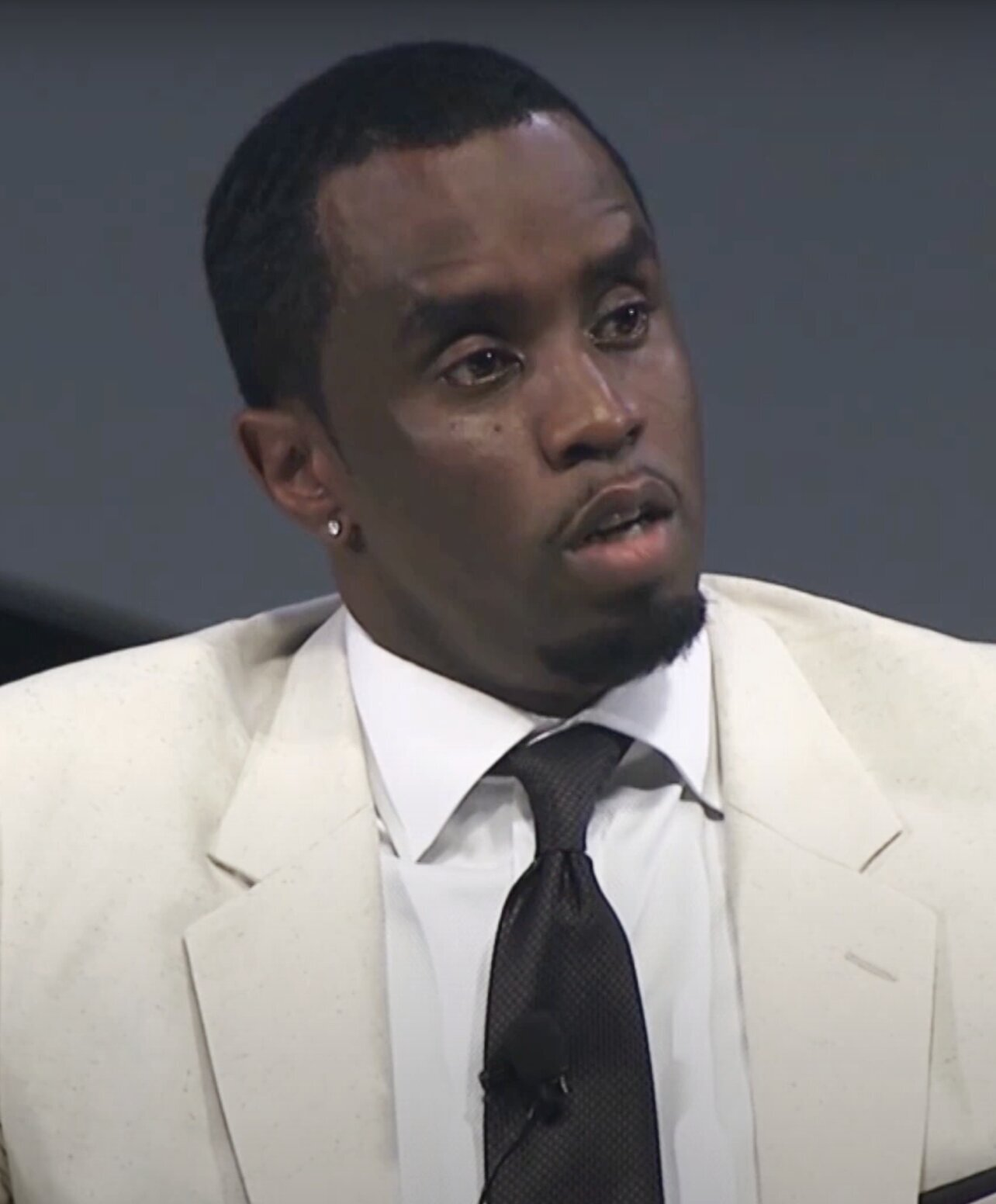
Combs in 2013

Combs created a rap supergroup in 2010 known as the Dream Team. The group consists of Combs, Rick Ross, DJ Khaled, Fat Joe, Busta Rhymes, Red Café, and Fabolous. Combs made an appearance at comedian Chris Gethard's live show in January 2010 at the Upright Citizens Brigade Theatre in New York City. In June 2010, Combs played a role, credited as Sean Combs, in the comedy film Get Him to the Greek, as Sergio Roma, a record company executive. An Entourage series representative announced that Combs would guest star on an episode during the 2010 season.

In 2009, recruiting singers Dawn Richard and Kalenna Harper, Combs formed the female duo Diddy – Dirty Money. The trio's first and only album, Last Train to Paris, was released by Interscope Records on December 13, 2010. The release was preceded by four singles: "Angels", "Hello Good Morning", "Loving You No More", and "Coming Home", each saw mixed success on the Billboard Hot 100, although the latter peaked at number 11 on the US Hot 100, number four in the UK, and number seven in Canada. Combs produced the group, and often performed with them. On March 10, 2011, Diddy and Dirty Money performed "Coming Home" live on American Idol.

On April 18, 2011, Combs appeared in season one of Hawaii Five-0, guest starring as an undercover NYPD detective. In November 2012, Combs appeared in an episode of the eighth season of the American sitcom It's Always Sunny in Philadelphia.

=== 2014–2017: MMM and Bad Boy anniversary ===
On February 26, 2014, Combs premiered "Big Homie", featuring Rick Ross and French Montana, as the first single from his mixtape MMM (Money Making Mitch), which was originally scheduled to be released that year. The song was released for digital download on March 24, and two days later the trailer for the music video was released. The full version of the music video was released on March 31. Combs used his former stage name Puff Daddy for the album. MMM was released as a free mixtape album of 12 tracks on November 4, 2015. In July 2014, Combs and Israeli record producer Guy Gerber released the collaborative album 11:11 as a free download. On June 29, 2015, Combs released the single "Finna Get Loose", which featured vocals and production by Pharrell Williams.

In July 2015, Bad Boy Entertainment signee Gizzle told the press that she was collaborating with Combs on the ultimately-cancelled album No Way Out 2, a sequel to his 1997 debut. She describes the music as unique: "The mindset is to just be classic and to be epic. And to really live up to that ... we know it's a tall order, but we welcome the challenge." In April 2016, Combs announced that after this album and its accompanying tour, he planned to retire from the music industry to focus on acting.

On May 20, 2016, Combs launched a tour of Bad Boy Records' biggest names to celebrate the 20th anniversary of the label. The documentary Can't Stop, Won't Stop: A Bad Boy Story, covering the two shows at the Barclays Center in Brooklyn as well as behind-the-scenes events, was released on June 23, 2017. The show toured to an additional twenty venues across the United States and Canada.

=== 2018–2024: Love, Love Records and The Love Album: Off the Grid ===
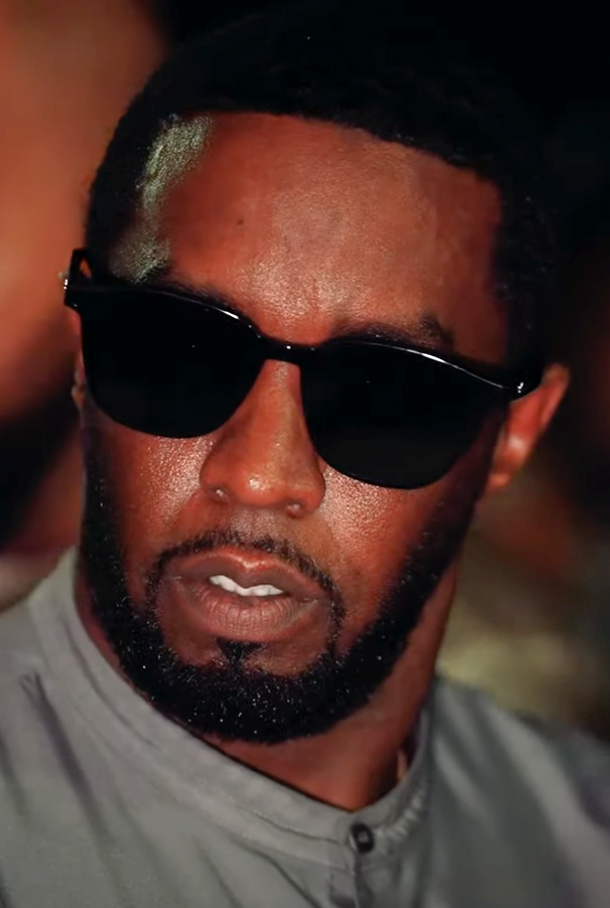
Combs in 2023

On November 5, 2017, Combs announced that he would be going by the name Love, stating, "My new name is Love, aka Brother Love." Two days later, he told the press he had been joking, but on January 3, 2018, he announced on Jimmy Kimmel Live! that he had changed his mind again, and will be using the new name after all. The change became official in 2022.

In 2019, Combs announced on Twitter that Making the Band would return to MTV in 2020. Due to the COVID-19 pandemic, it failed to do so; it was delayed once more for a release in 2021 before its complete cancellation. Combs executive-produced Nigerian singer Burna Boy's album, Twice as Tall, which was released on August 14, 2020. Combs hosted the 2022 Billboard Music Awards. In May 2022, he announced the startup of a new record label, Love Records as part of a recording contract with Motown. Along with Combs himself, the label's inaugural artist was singer Jozzy, who signed to the label that same month.

In June 2022, he released the single "Gotta Move On", which features singer Bryson Tiller and marked his first entry—at number 79—on the Billboard Hot 100 since "Coming Home". It was promoted as the lead single for the album, although it was only included on its expanded edition. On August 22, 2023, Combs released a teaser trailer on social media for his fifth studio album, The Love Album: Off the Grid, which was released on September 15, 2023.

Coinciding with its release was the lead single "Another One of Me" (with the Weeknd, French Montana and 21 Savage). The song peaked at number 87 on the Billboard Hot 100, while the album peaked at number 19 on the Billboard 200. Critical responses to both the song and album were mixed to average. Despite Combs's signing with Motown, the album was released independently, with the label's name only present on promotional materials. During an interview with Billboard, Combs stated that:

[I]'m in a season of total independence. I had an experience with Motown where it was like, 'I've come too far to ask somebody that isn't where I'm from about cultural and artistic things. If I'm going to bet on anybody, I'm going to bet on the people I believe in.' So I decided to go independent with Love Records and Bad Boy. I decided to come back into the game with bolder ideas of ownership, distribution and future manufacturing because those are the things that we as a people are cut out of.

The Love Album: Off the Grid received a nomination for Best Progressive R&B Album at the 66th Annual Grammy Awards, which commenced on February 4, 2024; Combs did not attend the ceremony, due to sexual misconduct allegations levied against him.

== Business career ==
Fortune magazine listed Combs at number 12 on their top 40 of entrepreneurs under 40 in 2002. Forbes magazine estimated that for the year ending May 2017, Combs earned $130 million, ranking him number one among entertainers. He topped the Forbes annual hip-hop rich list in 2014 and 2017. He is one of the wealthiest musical artists, with an estimated net worth of US$1 billion by 2022.

=== Sean John ===
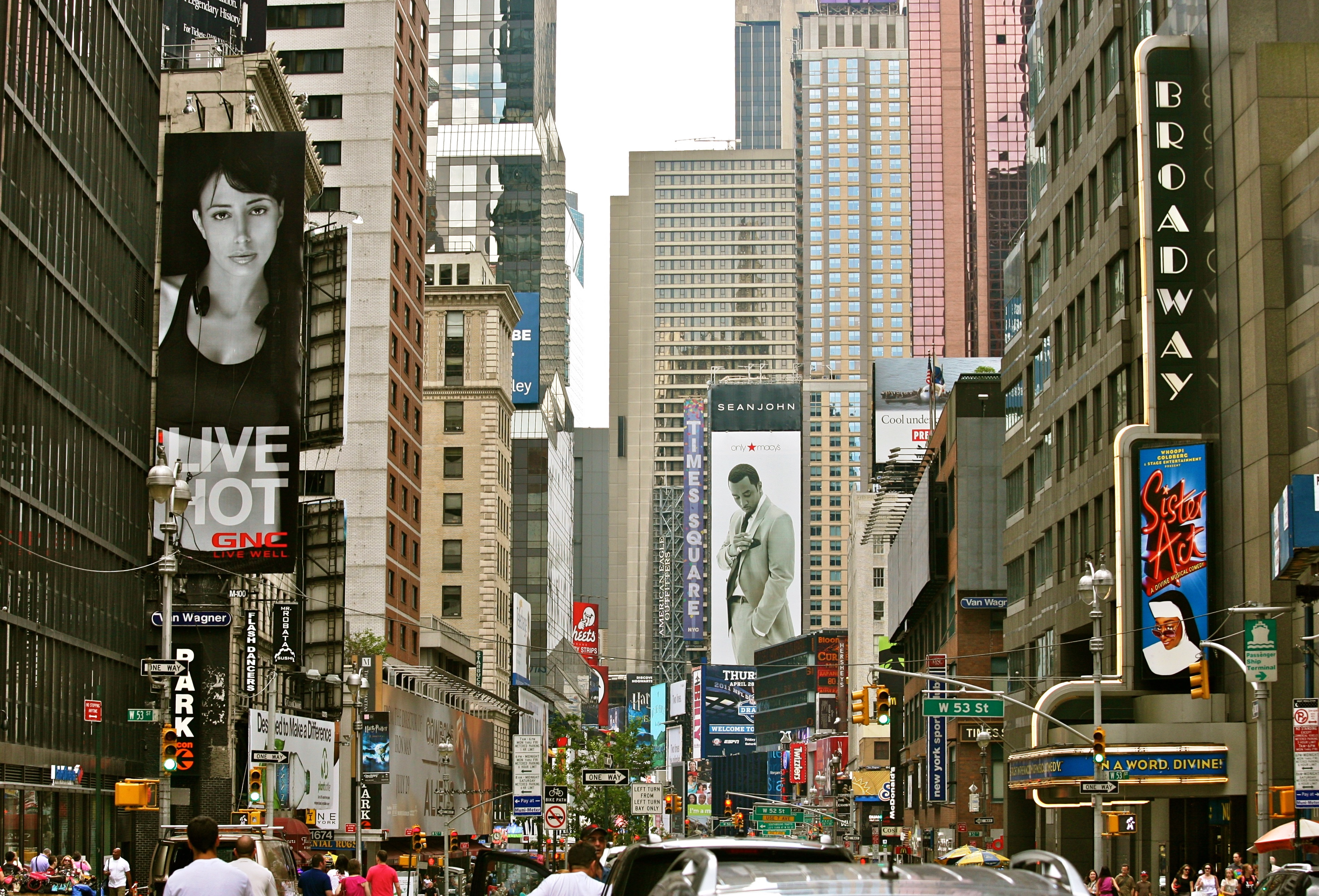
A billboard of Sean John is in the distance on Broadway, 2011.

In 1998, Combs started a clothing line, Sean John. It was nominated for the Council of Fashion Designers of America (CFDA) award for Menswear Designer of the Year in 2000, and won in 2004. California billionaire Ronald Burkle invested $100 million into the company in 2003.

In late 2006, the department store Macy's removed Sean John jackets from their shelves when they discovered that the clothing was made using raccoon dog fur. Combs had not known the jackets were made with genuine fur; as soon as he was alerted, he had production stopped.

In November 2008, Combs added a men's perfume line "I Am King" to the Sean John brand. The fragrance, dedicated to Barack Obama, Muhammad Ali, and Martin Luther King Jr., featured Bar Refaeli in its advertising. In early 2016, Sean John introduced the brand's GIRLS collection.

=== Other ventures ===
Combs is the head of Combs Enterprises, an umbrella company for his portfolio of businesses. In addition to his clothing line, Combs owned two restaurants called Justin's, named after his son. The original New York location closed in September 2007; the Atlanta location closed in June 2012. He is the designer of a Dallas Mavericks alternate jersey used from 2004 to 2009. In October 2007, Combs agreed to help develop the Cîroc vodka brand for a 50% share of the profits. In June 2023, after Ciroc was acquired by Diageo, they ended their partnership with Combs for "refusing to acknowledge or honor his commitments".

Combs acquired the Enyce clothing line from Liz Claiborne for $20 million on October 21, 2008.

Combs has a major equity stake in Revolt, a television network that also has a film production branch. It began broadcasting in 2014. In February 2015, Combs teamed up with actor Mark Wahlberg and businessman Ronald Burkle of Yucaipa Companies to purchase a majority holding in Aquahydrate, a calorie-free beverage for athletes. John Cochran, former president of Fiji Water, is CEO of the company.

In 2019, Combs became an investor in PlayVS, which provides an infrastructure for competitive gaming in US high schools. The company was also backed by Twitch co-founder Kevin Lin.

== Personal life ==
=== Family and relationships ===
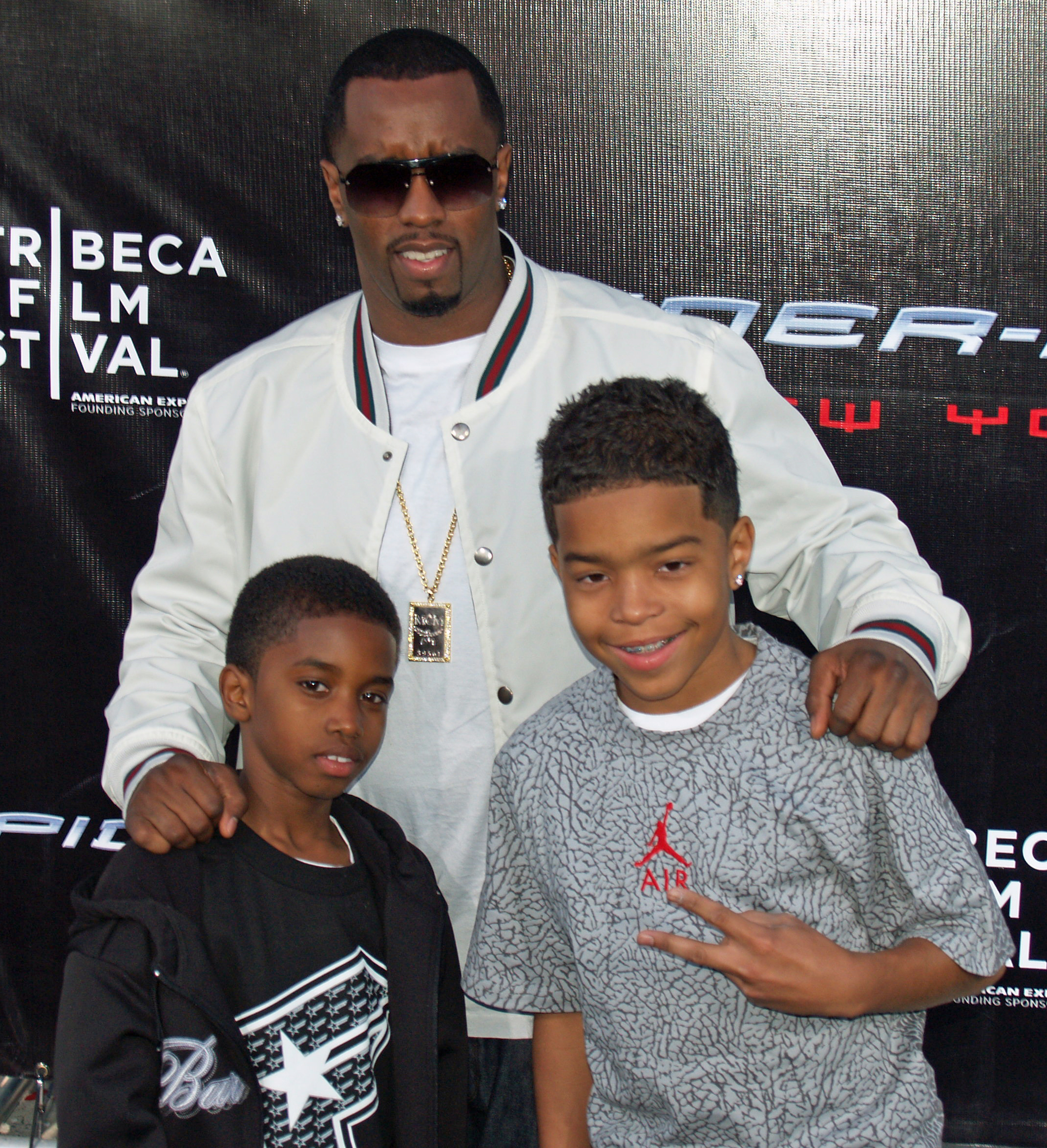
Combs with his sons Christian and Justin at the Spider-Man 3 premiere, 2007

Combs is a father to seven children. His first biological child, Justin, was born in 1993 to fashion designer and stylist Misa Hylton. Justin attended UCLA on a football scholarship and graduated in 2016. Combs had an on-again, off-again relationship with Kimberly Porter from 1994 to 2007. He raised and adopted Quincy, born 1991, Porter's son from a previous relationship with singer-producer and Combs's rival Al B. Sure!. Together, they had a son, Christian, born in 1998, and twin daughters, born in 2006. Porter died of pneumonia in 2018.

Five months before the birth of his twins, Combs had a daughter, born to Sarah Chapman. He took legal responsibility for her in October 2007. Combs was in an 11-year relationship with Cassie Ventura from 2007 to 2018. Combs's seventh child was born on October 15, 2022. Her mother is Dana Tran.

In November 2022, Combs and his second-eldest son became the first father–son duo to have simultaneous No. 1 hits. Combs reached the top of the Billboard Adult R&B Airplay chart with "Gotta Move On", while his son Christian, under his stage name King Combs, topped Mediabase's US Urban Radio chart with "Can't Stop Won't Stop", featuring Kodak Black.

Combs owns a home in Alpine, New Jersey, which he purchased for $7 million. In 2018, Combs bought Kerry James Marshall's 1997 painting Past Times for $21 million, establishing a record for a painting by a living black artist.

=== Religious views ===
In 2008, Combs told The Daily Telegraph that he does not belong to any specific religious denomination. He said, "I just follow right from wrong, so I could pray in a synagogue or a mosque or a church. I believe that there is only one God." In a 2023 interview, Combs said he believes that God is a woman.

=== Charity work and honors ===
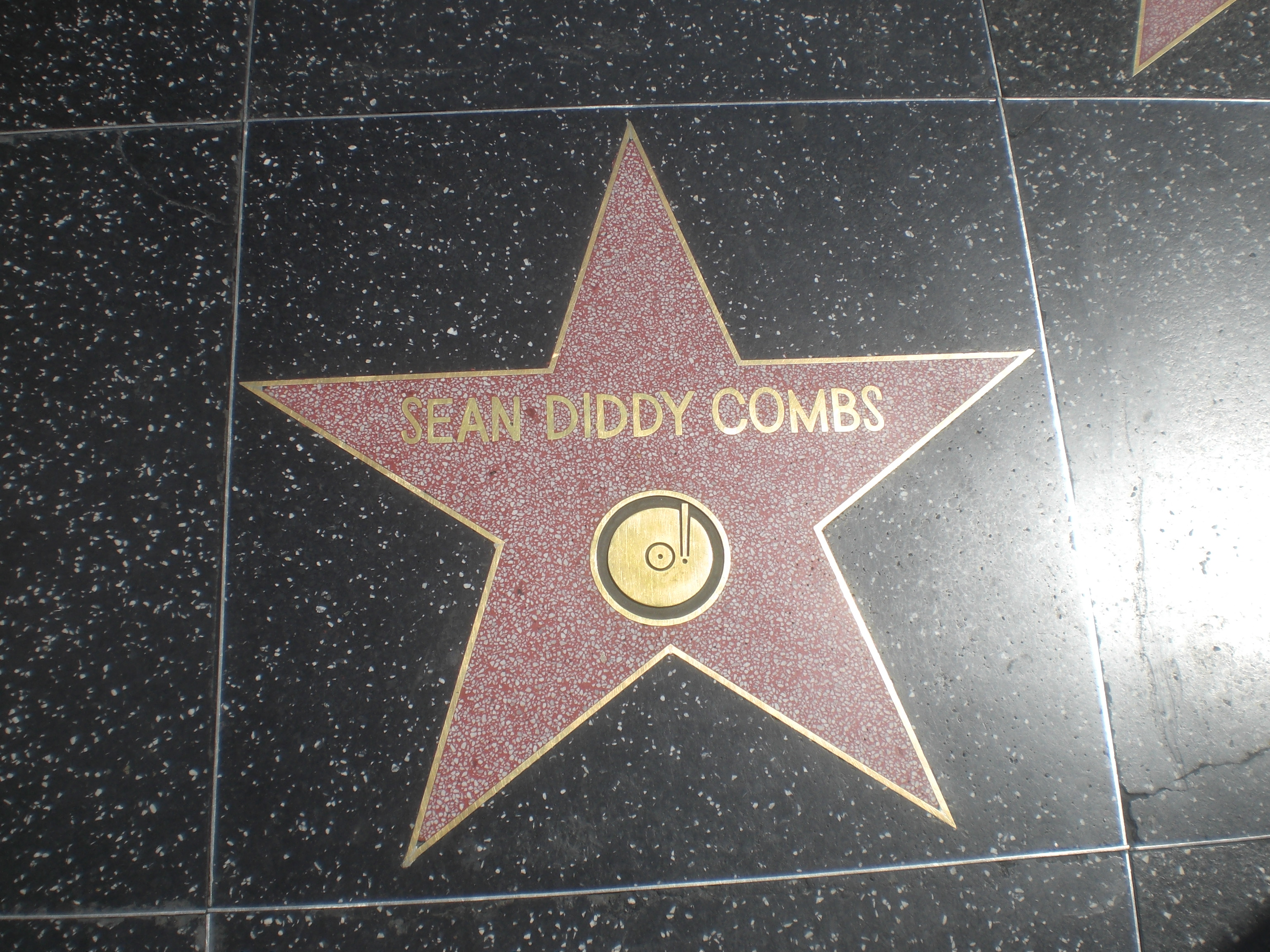
Combs's star on the Hollywood Walk of Fame

In 1995, Combs founded Daddy's House Social Programs, an organization to help inner-city youth. Programs include tutoring, life skills classes, and an annual summer camp. Along with Jay-Z, he pledged $1 million to help support victims of Hurricane Katrina in 2005, and donated clothing from his Sean John line to victims. He has donated computers and books to New York schools.

In 1998, Combs received a Golden Plate Award from the American Academy of Achievement. Chicago mayor Richard M. Daley named October 13, 2006, "Diddy Day" in honor of Combs's charity work. In 2008, Combs was honored with a star on the Hollywood Walk of Fame, the first male rapper to be so honored.

In 2014, Combs received an honorary doctorate in humanities from Howard University and gave the commencement speech for its 146th commencement ceremony. In his speech, Combs said his experiences as a Howard student positively influenced his life. In 2016, Combs donated $1 million to Howard University to establish the Sean Combs Scholarship Fund to help students who are unable to pay their tuition.

In 2022, Combs announced during his BET Lifetime Achievement Award acceptance speech that he would donate $1 million each to Howard University and Jackson State University. On June 7, 2024, Howard University announced that it was revoking Combs's honorary doctorate. It also returned his $1 million donation and terminated his pledge agreement.

=== White Parties ===
Combs held a series of parties known as White Parties between 1998 and 2009. The parties had a strict all-white dress code. According to a 2024 New York Times article, in the 2000s "few events held the [parties'] cultural cachet". CNN wrote, "there was a time when one of the hottest summer tickets belonged to anyone who was able to score an invite to party" with Combs and that the parties "marked the peak of his cultural influence".

== Legal issues ==
In 1997, Combs was sued for landlord negligence by Inge Bongo; Combs denied the charges. On April 15, 1999, shortly after the music video for Nas' "Hate Me Now" aired on MTV featuring Combs being crucified, he and two others burst into Nas' former manager, Steve Stoute's office and attacked him. Stoute sued Combs in June 1999, resulting in Combs paying him an out-of-court settlement of $500,000. Originally charged with assault for the event, Combs pleaded guilty on September 8, 1999, to a charge of harassment, and was sentenced to spend one day in an anger management class.

On December 27, 1999, Combs, his then-girlfriend Jennifer Lopez, and his protégé rapper Shyne were at Club New York in Times Square in Manhattan when gunfire occurred. A prosecutor said that the incident was sparked by an argument at the club between Combs and another patron. After a police investigation, Combs and Shyne were arrested for weapons violations and other charges. Combs was charged with four weapons-related crimes and with bribing his driver, Wardel Fenderson, to claim ownership of his gun.

With a gag order in place, the highly publicized trial began. Combs's attorneys were Johnnie L. Cochran Jr. and Benjamin Brafman. Combs was found not guilty on all charges. Shyne was convicted on five of his eight charges and sentenced to ten years in prison. Combs and Lopez broke up shortly after. A lawsuit filed by Fenderson, who said he suffered emotional damage after the shooting, was settled in February 2004. Lawyers for both sides, having agreed to keep the settlement terms secret, said the matter had been "resolved to the satisfaction of all parties".

In 2001, Combs was arrested for driving with a suspended license in Florida.

In 2003, the National Labor Committee revealed that factories producing the Sean John clothing brand in Honduras were violating Honduran labor laws. Accusations were that workers were subjected to body searches and involuntary pregnancy tests, bathrooms were locked and access tightly controlled, and employees were forced to work overtime and received sweatshop wages. Charles Kernaghan of the National Labor Committee told The New York Times that, "Sean Puff Daddy obviously has a lot of clout, he can literally do a lot overnight to help these workers." Combs responded with an extensive investigation, telling reporters, "I'm as pro-worker as they get." In February 2004, Kernaghan announced that improvements had been implemented at the factory, including adding air conditioning and water purification systems, firing the most abusive supervisors, and allowing the formation of a labor union.

Also in 2003, Kirk Burrowes sued Combs, claiming that Combs had forced him to give up his shares in Bad Boy Records through threats of violence. In 2006, the case was dismissed because the statute of limitations had expired.

In 2005, an assault charge against Combs filed by Michigan television host Rogelio Mills was resolved in Combs's favor.

Later in 2005, London-based musical artist and DJ Richard Dearlove, who had been performing under the name "Diddy" since 1992—nine years before Combs started using even "P. Diddy"—sought an injunction in the High Court of Justice in London. He accepted an out-of-court settlement of £10,000 in damages and more than £100,000 in costs. Combs can no longer use the name Diddy in the UK, where he is still known as P. Diddy.

In 2007, Gerard Rechnitzer sued Combs for battery, claiming Combs had punched him outside a Hollywood nightclub. Rechnitzer claimed he was attacked after he approached Combs while the rap mogul was talking to his girlfriend. Combs settled the lawsuit on undisclosed terms in March 2008.

In 2008, journalist Chuck Philips of the Los Angeles Times claimed that the Notorious B.I.G. and Combs orchestrated the 1994 robbery and shooting of Tupac, substantiating the claim with supposed FBI documents. The newspaper later retracted the story, acknowledging that the documents had been fabricated, and parted ways with Philips a few months later. In 2012, Dexter Isaac, an associate of record management executive Jimmy Henchman, confessed that he had shot Tupac on Henchman's orders.

In 2015, Combs was arrested for aggravated assault after an altercation with his son's football coach at the University of California, Los Angeles. On July 2, 2015, the assault charges were dropped due to lack of evidence.

In 2021, Combs filed a $60 million lawsuit against the new owners of Sean John, claiming the firm used his likeness without his permission and fabricated quotes endorsing their new product line. In 2023, Combs filed a racial discrimination lawsuit against Diageo, claiming that the spirits company deliberately "knee-capped" the marketing and sales of his Cîroc vodka and DeLéon tequila labels. In January 2024, Combs voluntarily withdrew the lawsuit with prejudice, and also severed the business relationship.

On March 4, 2024, music producer Rodney "Lil Rod" Jones, who was already suing Combs for sexual assault, filed a lawsuit against Combs and his son Justin, alleging that they engaged in a "massive" cover-up of their involvement in the shooting of a 30-year-old man at a "writers and producers camp" that was held at Combs's Chalice Recording Studio in Los Angeles in September 2022.

On March 25, 2024, former Syracuse University basketball player and Combs associate Brendan Paul was arrested at the Opa Locka Airport in Miami-Dade County, Florida, on two charges of cocaine and controlled substance possession; he was released the next day after posting a $2,500 bond. Lil Rod has accused Paul of being Combs's "drug mule" in court documents.

=== Lawsuits ===
In May 2017, Cindy Rueda, who previously had served as Combs's personal chef, filed a lawsuit against Combs in the Los Angeles County Superior Court, claiming, among other things, sexual harassment and retaliation. The lawsuit was settled for an undisclosed amount in February 2019.

Cassie Ventura, with whom Combs had a long-term relationship, filed a lawsuit against him on November 16, 2023, accusing him of rape, sex trafficking, and physical abuse. The lawsuit also suggested that Combs was responsible for blowing up Ventura's then-boyfriend Kid Cudi's car. Combs and Ventura reached an undisclosed settlement the following day, and the lawsuit was dismissed.

Two further lawsuits were filed against Combs by two additional complainants, alleging sexual assault and revenge porn, on November 23, 2023. One of the lawsuits claimed that in 1990 or 1991, Combs and Aaron Hall had sexually abused a woman, with Combs recording the incident.

On May 17, 2024, CNN released surveillance footage of Combs physically assaulting Ventura at the InterContinental hotel in Century City, Los Angeles, on March 5, 2016. This incident was among the allegations made in the lawsuit. On May 19, 2024, Combs issued a video apology on Instagram and Facebook, stating he was "truly sorry" and that his actions were "inexcusable". Combs's assault of Ventura was stopped by hotel staff, after which Combs allegedly tried to bribe the staff, according to a federal indictment in September 2024.

On October 1, 2024, The Washington Post reported that a team of lawyers will be filing as many as 120 more lawsuits, covering assaults that took place during the 2000s and 2010s. Plaintiffs, 25 of whom are minors, are both male and female. Tony Buzbee, one of the attorneys on the team, said most of the alleged assaults took place in New York State. Half of the alleged victims say they reported the assault to police, to a doctor, or to the FBI. Some claim to have been drugged or offered hush money. Additional potential defendants other than Combs are also to be named in the lawsuits: "The names that we're going to name, assuming our investigators confirm and corroborate what we've been told, are names that will shock you", Buzbee commented at a press conference in Houston. "I'm talking here about not just the cowardly but complicit bystanders, that is those people that we know watched this behavior occur and did nothing. I'm talking about the people that participated, encouraged it, egged it on. They know who they are." Buzbee filed the first six of these lawsuits in New York federal court on October 13, 2024. Andrew Van Arsdale of the AVA Law Group, which is working with Buzbee, said they have heard abuse allegations against Combs from some three thousand people, and their team is actively examining another hundred potential cases. Erica Wolff, a member of Combs's legal team, told the BBC that Combs "looks forward to proving his innocence and vindicating himself in court, where the truth will be established based on evidence, not speculation".

In 2025, Peacock released the documentary movie Diddy: The Making of a Bad Boy about Combs's life and legal issues, and Investigation Discovery released a four-part docuseries Fall of Diddy. On February 12, 2025, Combs's representatives filed a defamation lawsuit against NBCUniversal, Peacock, and Ample Entertainment alleging Diddy: The Making of a Bad Boy contains defamatory statements.

=== Arrest, trial, and sentence ===
Combs was arrested and indicted in the Southern District of New York on September 16, 2024, on charges of racketeering, sex trafficking by force, and transportation for purposes of prostitution. He is held in federal custody at the Federal Correctional Institution, Fort Dix. During a court appearance on October 10, 2024, Judge Arun Subramanian set Combs's trial start date as May 5, 2025. On November 27, 2024, a judge denied bail for a third time. On April 18, 2025, a request by Combs's lawyers to postpone the trial for two months was denied.

The trial began on May 5, 2025, with jury selection, while opening statements and witness testimony began on May 12. The prosecution and defense concluded their cases on June 24, 2025. Closing arguments began on June 26.

On July 2, 2025, after three days of deliberation, the jury found Combs guilty on two counts of transportation for the purposes of prostitution involving Ventura, another former girlfriend, and male sex workers, but not guilty of racketeering conspiracy and sex trafficking charges. Later that day, Combs was denied bail and ordered to remain in custody pending sentencing, which was scheduled on October 3. In August 2025, Combs's legal team said that they had reached out to President Donald Trump regarding a possible presidential pardon.

On October 3, 2025, Combs was sentenced to four years in prison, followed by five years of supervised release. With the 12 months already spent in holding, Combs was originally expected to be released in May 2028. As of November 2026, his release date is February 6, 2028.

Due to his convictions and the allegations against him, his associations with numerous celebrities, including U.S. President Donald Trump, have attracted controversy.

== Discography ==
=== Solo studio albums ===
- No Way Out (1997) (as Puff Daddy)
- Forever (1999) (as Puff Daddy)
- The Saga Continues... (2001) (as P. Diddy)
- Press Play (2006) (as P. Diddy)
- The Love Album: Off the Grid (2023)

=== Collaborative studio albums ===
- Last Train to Paris with Dirty Money (2010)
- 11 11 with Guy Gerber (2014) (as Puff Daddy)

== Filmography ==
=== Film ===
| Year | Title | Role | Notes |
|---|---|---|---|
| 2001 | Made | Ruiz | |
| 2001 | Monster's Ball | Lawrence Musgrove | |
| 2003 | Death of a Dynasty | Himself | |
| 2005 | Carlito's Way: Rise to Power | Hollywood Nicky | |
| 2009 | Notorious | —N/a | Executive producer |
| 2010 | Get Him to the Greek | Sergio | |
| 2010 | I'm Still Here | Himself | |
| 2014 | Muppets Most Wanted | Himself | |
| 2014 | Draft Day | Chris Crawford | |
| 2017 | Girls Trip | Himself | |

=== Television ===
| Year | Title | Role | Notes |
|---|---|---|---|
| 1992 | In Living Color | Himself | Episode: "Episode #3.27" |
| 1997 | The Steve Harvey Show | Himself | Episode: "I Do, I Don't" |
| 1997–2001 | Showtime at the Apollo | Himself | Recurring Guest |
| 1999 | Videotech | Himself | Episode: "Episode #1.136" |
| 1999 | The Priory | Himself | Episode: "Episode #1.3" |
| 1999–2001 | Behind the Music | Himself | Recurring Guest |
| 2000 | Top of the Pops | Himself | Episode: "Episode #37.11" |
| 2000 | Who Wants to Be a Millionaire | Himself/Contestant | Episode: "Episode #1.172" & "#1.174" |
| 2001 | Say It Loud: A Celebration of Black Music in America | Himself | Episode: "Express Yourself" |
| 2001 | Jackass | Himself | Episode: "Beard of Leeches" |
| 2001 | Journeys in Black | Himself | Episode: "Johnnie Cochran" |
| 2002 | All That | Himself | Episode: "P. Diddy" |
| 2002 | Anatomy of a Scene | Himself | Episode: "Monster's Ball" |
| 2002 | The Nick Cannon Show | Himself | Episode: "Nick Takes Over Style" |
| 2002 | MTV Europe Music Awards | Himself/Host | Main Host |
| 2002 | Top Ten | Himself | Episode: "Camp Pop" |
| 2004 | The Ashlee Simpson Show | Himself | Episode: "Ashlee Goes Platinum" |
| 2004 | Style Star | Himself | Episode: "Sean 'P. Diddy' Combs" |
| 2005 | MTV Video Music Awards | Himself/Host | Main Host |
| 2006 | Diary | Himself | Episode: "Diddy" |
| 2006 | E! True Hollywood Story | Himself | Episode: "Sean 'Diddy' Combs" |
| 2006 | Access Granted | Himself | Episode: "We Fly High Remix" |
| 2008 | A Raisin in the Sun | Walter Lee Younger | TV movie |
| 2009 | CSI: Miami | Derek Powell | Episode: "Presumed Guilty" & "Sink or Swim" |
| 2010 | Entourage | Himself | Episode: "Tequila and Coke" |
| 2011 | Hawaii Five-0 | Reggie Cole | Episode: "Hoʻopaʻi" |
| 2012 | It's Always Sunny in Philadelphia | Dr. Jinx | Episode: "Charlie's Mom Has Cancer" |
| 2015 | Black-ish | Elroy Savoy | Episode: "Pops' Pops' Pops" |
| 2016 | Stevie J & Joseline: Go Hollywood | Himself | Episode: "L.A., The Stevie J Way" |
| 2016 | Finding Your Roots | Himself | Episode: "Family Reunions" |
| 2016 | The Voice | Himself/Advisor | Recurring Advisor: Season 10 |
| 2016 | Inside the Label | Himself | Episode: "Uptown Records, Part I & II" |
| 2017 | The Defiant Ones | Himself | Main Guest |
| 2018 | The Four: Battle for Stardom | Himself/Judge | Main Judge |
| 2022 | Hip-Hop Evolution | Himself | Guest Cast: Season 2–3 |
| 2022 | Billboard Music Awards | Himself/Host | Main Host |

=== Documentary ===
| Year | Title |
|---|---|
| 1995 | The Show |
| 1998 | Where It's At: The Rolling Stone State of the Union |
| 2002 | Street Dreams |
| 2004 | Fade to Black |
| 2005 | Seamless |
| 2016 | The Art of Organized Noize |
| 2017 | Clive Davis: The Soundtrack of Our Lives |
| 2017 | House of Z |
| 2017 | Can't Stop, Won't Stop: A Bad Boy Story |
| 2017 | The Defiant Ones |
| 2019 | The Black Godfather |
| 2021 | Mary J. Blige's My Life |
| 2024 | The French Montana Story: For Khadija |

== Tours ==
- No Way Out Tour (1997–1998)
- Forever Tour (2000)
- The Heavyweights of Hip-Hop (with Snoop Dogg) (2007)
- Bad Boy Family Reunion Tour (2016)

== Awards and nominations ==
Combs is listed as having a Guinness World Record for "Most Successful Rap Producer" in 1997, as he was producer of singles that charted for 36 consecutive weeks in 1997. In 2021, Combs was among the inaugural inductees into the Black Music and Entertainment Walk of Fame. In June 2022, Combs received the BET Lifetime Achievement Award. In September 2023, Combs was awarded the key to New York City by Mayor Eric Adams.

He received an MTV VMA Global Icon Award in 2023.

Awards and nominations received by Sean Combs
| Award | Year | Nominated work | Category | Result | Ref. |
|---|---|---|---|---|---|
| BET Awards | 2002 | "Bad Boy for Life" (featuring Black Rob & Mark Curry) | Video of the Year | Nominated | |
| BET Awards | 2002 | "Pass the Courvoisier, Part II" (with Busta Rhymes & Pharrell Williams) | Video of the Year | Won | |
| BET Awards | 2003 | "Bump, Bump, Bump" (with B2K) | Coca-Cola Viewer's Choice Award | Won | |
| BET Awards | 2007 | "Last Night" (featuring Keyshia Cole) | Best Collaboration | Nominated | |
| BET Awards | 2007 | Diddy | Best Male Hip-Hop Artist | Nominated | |
| BET Awards | 2010 | Diddy – Dirty Money | Best Group | Nominated | |
| BET Awards | 2011 | Diddy – Dirty Money | Best Group | Won | |
| BET Awards | 2012 | Diddy – Dirty Money | Best Group | Nominated | |
| BET Awards | 2016 | Puff Daddy and the Family | Best Group | Nominated | |
| BET Hip Hop Awards | 2008 | "Roc Boys (And the Winner Is)..." | Track of the Year | Nominated | |
| BET Hip Hop Awards | 2008 | Sean Combs | Hustler of the Year | Won | |
| BET Hip Hop Awards | 2009 | Sean Combs | Hustler of the Year | Nominated | |
| BET Hip Hop Awards | 2010 | "All I Do Is Win (Remix)" | Reese's Perfect Combo Award | Nominated | |
| BET Hip Hop Awards | 2010 | "Hello Good Morning (Remix)" | Reese's Perfect Combo Award | Nominated | |
| BET Hip Hop Awards | 2010 | "Hello Good Morning (Remix)" | Best Club Banger | Nominated | |
| BET Hip Hop Awards | 2010 | Sean Combs | Hustler of the Year | Won | |
| BET Hip Hop Awards | 2011 | Sean Combs | Hustler of the Year | Nominated | |
| BET Hip Hop Awards | 2012 | "Same Damn Time (Remix)" | Sweet 16: Best Featured Verse | Nominated | |
| BET Hip Hop Awards | 2013 | "Same Damn Time (Remix)" | Sweet 16: Best Featured Verse | Nominated | |
| BET Hip Hop Awards | 2013 | Sean Combs | Hustler of the Year | Nominated | |
| BET Hip Hop Awards | 2017 | Sean Combs | Hustler of the Year | Nominated | |
| Grammy Awards | 1998 | Puff Daddy | Best New Artist | Nominated | |
| Grammy Awards | 1998 | No Way Out | Best Rap Album | Won | |
| Grammy Awards | 1998 | Life After Death (as producer) | Best Rap Album | Nominated | |
| Grammy Awards | 1998 | "Honey" (as songwriter) | Best Rhythm & Blues Song | Nominated | |
| Grammy Awards | 1998 | "I'll Be Missing You" (featuring Faith Evans & 112) | Best Rap Performance by a Duo or Group | Won | |
| Grammy Awards | 1998 | "Mo Money Mo Problems" (with the Notorious B.I.G. & Mase) | Best Rap Performance by a Duo or Group | Nominated | |
| Grammy Awards | 1998 | "Can't Nobody Hold Me Down" (featuring Mase) | Best Rap Performance by a Duo or Group | Nominated | |
| Grammy Awards | 2000 | "Satisfy You" (featuring R. Kelly) | Best Rap Performance by a Duo or Group | Nominated | |
| Grammy Awards | 2002 | "Bad Boy for Life" (with Black Rob & Mark Curry) | Best Rap Performance by a Duo or Group | Nominated | |
| Grammy Awards | 2003 | "Pass the Courvoisier, Part II" (with Busta Rhymes & Pharrell) | Best Rap Performance by a Duo or Group | Nominated | |
| Grammy Awards | 2004 | "Shake Ya Tailfeather" (with Nelly & Murphy Lee) | Best Rap Performance by a Duo or Group | Won | |
| Grammy Awards | 2016 | "All Day" (as songwriter) | Best Rap Song | Nominated | |
| Grammy Awards | 2024 | The Love Album: Off the Grid | Best Progressive R&B Album | Nominated | |
| MTV Europe Music Awards | 1997 | "I'll Be Missing You" | MTV Select | Nominated | |
| MTV Europe Music Awards | 1997 | "I'll Be Missing You" | Best Song | Nominated | |
| MTV Europe Music Awards | 1997 | Sean Combs | Best New Act | Nominated | |
| MTV Europe Music Awards | 1997 | Sean Combs | Best Hip-Hop | Nominated | |
| MTV Europe Music Awards | 1998 | Sean Combs | Best Male | Nominated | |
| MTV Europe Music Awards | 1998 | Sean Combs | Best Hip-Hop | Nominated | |
| MTV Europe Music Awards | 1999 | Sean Combs | Best Hip-Hop | Nominated | |
| MTV Europe Music Awards | 2001 | Sean Combs | Best Hip-Hop | Nominated | |
| MTV Europe Music Awards | 2002 | Sean Combs | Best Hip-Hop | Nominated | |
| MTV Europe Music Awards | 2006 | Sean Combs | Best Hip-Hop | Nominated | |
| MTV Europe Music Awards | 2011 | Diddy – Dirty Money | Best World Stage Performance | Nominated | |
| MTV Movie & TV Awards | 2018 | Can't Stop, Won't Stop: A Bad Boy Story | Best Music Documentary | Nominated | |
| MTV Video Music Awards | 1997 | "I'll Be Missing You" | Best R&B Video | Won | |
| MTV Video Music Awards | 1997 | "I'll Be Missing You" | Viewer's Choice | Nominated | |
| MTV Video Music Awards | 1998 | "It's All About the Benjamins" (Rock Remix) | Video of the Year | Nominated | |
| MTV Video Music Awards | 1998 | "It's All About the Benjamins" (Rock Remix) | Viewer's Choice | Won | |
| MTV Video Music Awards | 1998 | "Come with Me" (from Godzilla) | Best Video from a Film | Nominated | |
| MTV Video Music Awards | 2002 | "Bad Boy for Life" | Best Rap Video | Nominated | |
| NAACP Image Awards | 2009 | A Raisin in the Sun | Outstanding Actor in a Television Movie, Mini-Series or Dramatic Special | Won | |
| NAACP Image Awards | 2011 | Diddy – Dirty Money | Outstanding Duo or Group | Nominated | |

== Sources ==
- Harrison, Thomas (2011). Music of the 1990s. American History Through Music. Santa Barbara, CA: Greenwood. ISBN 978-0-313-37942-0.
- Jones, Jen (2014). Sean "Diddy" Combs: A Biography of a Music Mogul. African-American Icons. Berkeley Heights, NJ: Enslow. ISBN 978-0-7660-4296-4.
- Traugh, Susan M. (2010). Sean Combs. People in the News. Farmington Hills, MI: Lucent Books. ISBN 978-1-4205-0237-4.
