= Past Times (painting) =

1997 painting by Kerry James Marshall

Past Times is a 1997 painting by Kerry James Marshall.

It is made with acrylic paint with collage on canvas and measures 9 ft. 6 in. × 13 ft. (289.6 × 396.2 cm).

It depicts African-Americans enjoying leisure activities including boating, croquet, and golf. Some subjects are having a picnic. Towers similar to those found in public housing are in the background.

It was bought for $25,000 in 1997 by the Metropolitan Pier and Exposition Authority of Chicago from the Koplin Gallery in Los Angeles. It was sold at auction at Sotheby's in May 2018 for $21 million, establishing a record for a painting by a living black artist. It was bought by Sean Combs and was displayed at his 50th birthday party in December 2019.

It was displayed as part of the 2016–17 touring exhibition Kerry James Marshall: Mastry at the Museum of Contemporary Art Chicago, The Metropolitan Museum of Art, New York and the Museum of Contemporary Art, Los Angeles.
