= Kerry James Marshall =

American artist and professor (born 1955)

- Born: October 17, 1955 (age 70); Birmingham, Alabama, U.S.
- Education: Otis College of Art and Design (BFA)
- Occupations: Painter; sculptor; professor
- Spouse: Cheryl Lynn Bruce (m. 1989)
- Relatives: Sydney Kamlager-Dove (stepdaughter)
- Awards: MacArthur Fellowship

Kerry James Marshall (born October 17, 1955) is an American artist and professor, known for his paintings of Black figures. He previously taught painting at the School of Art and Design at the University of Illinois at Chicago. In 2017, Marshall was included on the annual Time 100 list of the most influential people in the world. He was born and raised in Birmingham, Alabama, and moved in childhood to South Central Los Angeles. He has spent much of his career in Chicago, Illinois.

A retrospective exhibition of his work, Kerry James Marshall: Mastry, was assembled by the Museum of Contemporary Art, Chicago in 2016.

== Early life and education ==
Marshall was born October 17, 1955, in Birmingham, Alabama, United States. He was raised in Birmingham and later moved to Los Angeles, California, as part of the Great Migration. He is the son of a postal worker and a homemaker. His father's hobby was buying broken watches that he would inexpensively acquire in pawnshops and learn how to fix them with the help of books, before reselling the watches.

Marshall's home in Los Angeles was near the Black Panther Party's headquarters, which left him with a feeling of social responsibility and influenced his work directly.

The subject matter of his paintings, installations, and public projects is drawn from African-American culture and is rooted in the geography of his upbringing. In 1963, he moved with his family to the Nickerson Gardens public housing project in the Watts district of Los Angeles, just a few years before the race riots began.

=== Education ===
In high school, Marshall began figure drawing under the mentorship of social realist painter Charles White, which continued on into Marshall's college career. He stated that during the years of his training, White "became as much as a friend as a mentor; I kept in touch with his family, even after his death." While studying at Otis College of Art and Design in Los Angeles, Marshall worked to "not have a representational image or a specific story to tell" over abstraction. Marshall earned a B.F.A. degree in 1978 from Otis College of Art and Design.

== Career ==
In 1992, art dealer Jack Shainman approached Marshall after seeing his exhibition at the Chicago Cultural Center. He spent a year persuading Marshall to mount a show in SoHo. Although the exhibition did not receive the level of attention Shainman had expected—resulting in the sale of only three paintings at $7,000 each—he continued to place Marshall’s work in a range of venues, including museums. This sustained exposure led to significant critical recognition, and in 2018 Marshall’s painting Past Times sold for $21.1 million at Sotheby’s.

Marshall was awarded a MacArthur Fellowship in 1997. He was a professor at the University of Illinois in Chicago in the School of Art and Design from 1993 until 2006. In 2013, he was named for the Committee on the Arts and the Humanities by President Barack Obama, one of seven new appointees chosen.

Conceptual artist Hank Willis Thomas has said that Marshall was a big influence on him and his practice.

== Work influence, social views and themes ==
Untitled (Studio) (2014) at the Metropolitan Museum of Art in 2022

Marshall's childhood time spent in the Watts neighborhood of Los Angeles, California, where the Black Power and Civil Rights movements happened, had a significant impact on his paintings. Strongly influenced by his experiences as a young man, he developed a signature style during his early years as an artist that involved the use of extremely dark, essentially black figures. These images represent his perspective of African Americans, specifically black men with separate and distinct inner and outer appearances. At the same time, they confront racial stereotypes within contemporary American society. This common theme appeared continuously in his work throughout the subsequent decades, especially in the 1980s and 1990s, and still appears in his most recent works.

Marshall is known for large-scale paintings, sculptures, and other objects that take African-American life and history as their subject matter. In a 1998 interview with Bomb Magazine, Marshall observed:

"Black people occupy a space, even mundane spaces, in the most fascinating ways. Style is such an integral part of what black people do that just walking is not a simple thing. You've got to walk with style. You've got to talk with a certain rhythm; you've got to do things with some flair. And so in the paintings I try to enact that same tendency toward the theatrical that seems to be so integral a part of the black cultural body."

Marshall believes that the gears of historical and institutional power in Western art resided primarily in painting. When he studied at Otis, he was fascinated by the work of Bill Traylor, the self-taught artist who was born into enslavement in Alabama, which inspired Marshall to create more artwork relating to depiction of "a kind of old-timey, grinning racial trope".

Marshall is one of the members of the contemporary artists of color such as Mickalene Thomas, Howardena Pindell, Charlene Teters, and Fred Wilson, who often incorporated the issue of race into their work. Marshall's work is steeped in black history and black popular culture embracing blackness as a signifier of difference to critically address the marginalization of blacks in the visual sphere, utilizing a wide range of styles. His artworks are identity-based; specifically, he made black aesthetics visible and brought the black aesthetic into the fold of the grand narrative of art. In his own words, he uses blackness to amplify the difference as an oppositional force, both aesthetically and philosophically. One such "black" issue Marshall takes up is that of beauty. He stated that since most figures in advertising are white, he wanted to produce images of black bodies to "offset the impression that beauty is synonymous with whiteness" "Black is beautiful" was one of the Black Arts movement's slogans to counter the prevailing view that blackness was inherently unattractive. Marshall directly appropriates the slogan in some of his works by utilizing language. Along with "Black is beautiful", he wanted to create an epic narrative in his paintings in the "grand manner". His focus was to create new works of art that were not a part of the western art-historical tradition.

Most of Marshall's painting engages allegory and symbolism. Most of his work's subject matter relates to the iniquities of colonial regimes. Marshall is best known for his richly designed large acrylic paintings on unstretched canvas. His works combined rough-hewn realism with elements of collage, signage, with lively and highly patterned settings. His images often suggest populist banners. Viewers often will see ornate texts and figures looking directly into them. Some of his works often are under-represented black middle class and many employ pictorial strategies. His artworks are closely related to the Black Arts movement. Through exploring the theme of being black in America, Marshall's work also explores race in context with the "Civil Rights Movement, Black Power Movement, housing projects, black beauty, and the political and social invisibility of blacks". Marshall's work was heavily influenced by his upbringing in Alabama in the 1950s and Los Angeles in the 1960s. His works were always based on the experience of being black in America during these time periods.

Marshall created comic strips, such as Rhythm Mastr, a story of an African-American teenager who gained superpowers through African sculptures using drum patterns. Specifically, the powers are derived from the seven gods that make up the Yoruba pantheon. Marshall chose this to address the differences in how African and Western mythologies, such as Greek and Norse, are represented. Whereas the latter remain culturally significant with a level of currency to them, Marshall believes that the former has been forgotten - being treated as "either dead or obsolete". Marshall was concerned with the lack of African-American heroes kids could look up to while growing up. He revisited the Comic 20 years after its debut at the 2018 Carnegie International. When questioned about the presence of Marvel's Black Panther as a Black comic book hero, Marshall retorted with the fact that he was still created by white writers and therefore not representative of black culture. Other comics included P-Van, which was inspired by some guys who would sit in a Van outside Marshall's studio and just "hang out", and On the Stroll, which was based on neighborhood prostitutes with Marshall taking them out of that context and humanizing them. He was one of the many African-American artists who tried to incorporate themes of race and being black into his works, hoping to diversify the art historical canon. Some of his works, such as La Venus Negra and Voyager, combine African aesthetics with Western traditions, showing the struggle of African Americans to find their place in American society. Oftentimes Marshall's works were perceived to be full of emotion portraying what it was like being an Urban African American, displaying middle-class African-American homes and families. Other projects of Marshall's, namely The Garden Project and Souvenir, demonstrate the issues of race in America from the 1960s and 1970s and onward. The Garden Project also critiques the glorified names of housing projects that conceal desperate poverty, while the Lost Boys series examines young black men "lost in the ghetto, lost in public housing, lost in joblessness, and lost in illiteracy." Marshall's work is dynamic and consistently relevant, especially to the problem of finding an identity.

Marshall reflected: "Under Charles White's influence I always knew that I wanted to make work that was about something: history, culture, politics, social issues. … It was just a matter of mastering the skills to actually do it."

== Work ==
=== Portrait of the Artist as a Shadow of His Former Self (1980) ===
The painting Portrait of the Artist as a Shadow of His Former Self (1980) was a departure for Marshall, and was the first painting he made of a Black figure. Prior to this work, Marshall was working in collage. It is a small painting, made with egg tempera on paper. It was created primarily in shades of black and depicts the bust of a black man with a large white smile and gapped teeth. Since 2019, this painting is housed in the collection at Los Angeles County Museum of Modern Art (LACMA).

=== Voyager (1992) ===
Voyager (1992) at the National Gallery of Art in 2022

Marshall based several of his pieces in the early 1990s on actual events in American history. One such painting,Voyager, painted in 1992, has special pertinence in a discussion of race issues in the United States because Marshall based it on a "luxury schooner ... secretly outfitted to carry African slaves". Symbols of this representation abound, from the two black figures in the boat and the flowers draped around the woman's neck to the contrast between the light and airy clouds and the darkness of the upper background. A skull lies in the water, just beneath the ship, hinting at the doomed future of the Africans, and the unknown woman has an expression of uneasiness. He thus brings to the forefront the irony of a ship with a beautiful, high-class appearance and a dark secret purpose, forcing people to think about something they would rather forget.

=== Black beauty, Untitled (La Venus Negra) (1992) and Untitled (Supermodel) (1994) ===
Untitled (Supermodel) (1994), Honolulu Museum of Art

Marshall explored the concept of black beauty in contrast to Western ideals with his painting, Untitled (La Venus Negra) (1992). The figure literally blends into her dark surroundings, her sensuous shape barely discernible. Yet, once the viewer looks closely, her curvaceous figure evokes a womanly power only enhanced by the deep black of her skin. The painting Untitled (Supermodel) (1994), is in the collection of the Honolulu Museum of Art, this work portrays a black woman trying to look like blond Caucasian models. The work also references self-portraits of the artist, who adorns himself with pale lipstick and a long blond wig.

As Marshall admits, he himself "had not considered that a black woman could be considered a goddess of love and beauty," but with this painting he proves its possibility. He challenges the classic perception of a goddess as a white woman with long flowing hair, speaking again to the issue of African-American identity in the Western world. This concept has more meaning when looking at the African pattern on the top quarter of the background. With this addition, he references the movement begun during the Harlem Renaissance to incorporate traditional African aesthetics into African-American art. In an attempt to reconcile the African art and Western ideals, Marshall places both in his painting. Thus he highlights the search for a black identity that involves all aspects of their ancestral history and their current situation. Although African Americans may feel connected to two differing cultures, Marshall's painting of a classically Western figure represented with a new black aesthetic brings the two together, showing that they can live in harmony.

=== The Lost Boys series (1993–1995) ===
One of his most famous series of works The Lost Boys (1993–1995) displays the lives of and issues many African Americans faced. The series of portraits was of young African-American boys from the shoulder up, with very dark skin tones, which contrasted with extreme whiteness of the subject's eyes which was common in Marshall's works. The portraits also featured almost completely white imagery, with white orbs, flowers, and areas in the background to create even more contrast. The artist explained that this series of portraits was to show these young boys loss of innocence at an early age and being a victim to ghettos and public housing.

=== The Garden Project series ===
Vignette #2, 2008. Acrylic on Plexiglas displayed at Chicago Art Institute.

The Garden Project is an insightful series of paintings, both in its shrill outcry against the false promises and despairing reality of low-income public housing and in its capacity to show the incredible ability of African Americans to find happiness and build community despite these conditions. Through this series, Marshall reveals the inherent contradictions and profound juxtapositions between the idealized promises of Public Housing Projects and the often harsh, despairing reality of those living in them. But Marshall goes beyond merely exposing the discrepancy between this ideal and its corresponding reality, as his work alludes to the sense of community and hope that African Americans were able to create within the grinding conditions of low-income housing. Inspired by his former home, Nickerson Gardens, Marshall's series "The Garden Project" makes an ironic play on the connotations inherent in the word "garden". The five paintings in the series depict different public housing projects – Rockwell Gardens, Wentworth Gardens, Stateway Gardens, etc. – exploring how the almost eden-like imagery used in the names is absurd in regards to these failed projects. Executed on unstretched canvas, these massive paintings appear mural-like. Their collaged elements and, at times, rough surface treatment signify the decrepitude of public housing projects and the difficulty of life within them.

=== Many Mansions (1994) ===
Marshall's Many Mansions, from 1994, exposes the contradiction between the name "Stateway Gardens", and the reality of life there. There is a deceitful cheerfulness permeating the piece, as the landscape is illustrated in full bloom. The exaggeratedly black figures are planting blossoming flowers, the trees are pristinely cut, and everything appears bountiful. But Marshall's black figures, as Michael Kimmelman notes in his New York Times piece, are "stiff and stylized: almost stereotypes". They epitomize the impoverished black man living in public housing and unlike the landscape that surrounds them, they are not cheerful. One stares condemningly at the viewer, while the other two avert their gaze, all devoid of happiness. The buildings they live in appear as cardboard backdrops, calling attention to the falsity of the situation. Truth is not found in the beautiful utopianism of the scenery or flowers, but rather in the artificiality of the buildings and the stereotypical, damning images of the men who live in them.

=== Souvenir series ===
The Souvenir series chronicles the loss dealt to American society from the deaths of leaders in politics, literature, arts, and music. Souvenir III, finished in 1998, centers on the angel that arbitrates the present with the past. She is an angel of annunciation and the caretaker of the living room's arrangements. However, in creating a new rhetoric of black people in America, he highlights their differences from conventional white power structures. There is a subtlety to the characters that compels the viewer to look deeper: these figures are directly in opposition to the abstraction black artists felt they had to incorporate in order to become mainstream artists. Marshall calls this incorporation of a strong aesthetic and political commentary a "visual authority" that commands the attention of society Within Souvenir III, the names of prominent black historical figures and the years of their deaths are featured at the top of the mural-sized painting. Thus, the theme of timelessness emerges: the viewer is in the present ruminating on the legacies of figures who are both civil rights champions and African-American artists. The paintings reinforce these symbols of remembrance with the phrases "We Mourn Our Loss" and "In Memory Of". Souvenir IV (1998), likewise set in a middle-class living room based on Marshall's family's living quarters, is realism with a touch of the intangible. Through the painting the viewer is traveling to the Civil Rights era and the painting itself is a postcard that also marks the journey. The entire scene echoes Egyptian rituals of supplying the dead in the afterlife with furnishings and food. Souvenir III and IV are done in the grisaille style, an "old-master narrative painting" technique, while Souvenir I and II (1997) are done in color. As one examines the backgrounds of the Souvenir series, the viewer realizes the lushness of the settings even within the monochromatic natures of III and IV. A Marshall hallmark is the stamping repeated through a painting, seen here as angel wings surrounding the black leaders, and floral backgrounds, seen here as glittered ornamentation.

=== Public art by Marshall ===
In 2017, Marshall was commissioned by the non-profit, Murals of Acceptance to produce a public mural entitled, Rush More. Located on the west façade of the Chicago Cultural Center, the piece is an homage to women who have contributed to the culture of Chicago including Illinois poet Laureate Gwendolyn Brooks, media icon Oprah Winfrey, author Sandra Cisneros, as well as artist Margaret Burroughs among others.

In 2018, two of Marshall's large-scale works came to public attention in a clash between public art, and commerce. In May, Past Times (1997) was sold by Chicago's Metropolitan Pier and Exposition Authority to Sean Combs for a $21 million funding windfall to the public agency, after hanging in McCormick Place for many years. Past Times had played an important role during its loan to the 2016 museum exhibition. In October, Chicago Mayor Rahm Emanuel announced plans to upgrade the Legler Branch of the Chicago Public Library on the West Side. The upgrade would be financed by the auction of the library's Knowledge and Wonder (1995). After criticism, including from Marshall, the Mayor cancelled the auction.

In 2021, Marshall was selected by Washington National Cathedral through its Racial Justice Windows Project to create two new stained glass windows. These replace earlier windows dating from 1953, which honored Confederate generals Robert E. Lee and Thomas "Stonewall" Jackson; the cathedral deconsecrated and removed those windows in 2017. Marshall's new windows, titled "Now and Forever", are the artist's first work in the medium of stained glass. They were revealed and dedicated publicly at the cathedral on September 23, 2023.

== Exhibitions ==
Marshall has staged several solo shows and exhibitions at museums and galleries in the United States and internationally. His solo shows include Kerry James Marshall, Telling Stories: Selected Paintings (1994–1995), originating at the Museum of Contemporary Art Cleveland; Kerry James Marshall: Mementos (1998–2000), originating at the Renaissance Society, Chicago; Along the Way (2005–2006), originating at Camden Arts Centre, London; Kerry James Marshall: In the Tower (2013), National Gallery of Art, Washington, D.C.; and Kerry James Marshall: Mastry (2016–2017), originating at the Museum of Contemporary Art, Chicago (also exhibited at the Metropolitan Museum of Art).

His work has also been exhibited in numerous group exhibitions, including documenta X (1997); the 50th Venice Biennale (2003); documenta 12 (2007); and Afro-Atlantic Histories (2022).

From 20 September 2025 - 18 January 2026, the Royal Academy of Arts presented Kerry James Marshall: The Histories, an exhibition of over 70 of Marshall’s works. It is “the largest survey of Marshall’s work ever presented in Europe;” the exhibition was curated by the Royal Academy of Arts, London in collaboration with the Kunsthaus Zurich and the Musée d'Art Moderne, Paris. An exhibition catalog accompanied the exhibit. ISBN 978-1-915-81512-5

== Notable works in public collections ==
- Silence is Golden (1986), Studio Museum in Harlem, New York
- When Frustration Threatens Desire (1990), Glenstone, Potomac, Maryland
- Voyager (1992), National Gallery of Art, Washington, D.C.
- De Style (1993), Los Angeles County Museum of Art
- The Lost Boys (A.K.A. Untitled) (1993), Seattle Art Museum
- Better Homes, Better Gardens (1994), Denver Art Museum
- Great American (1994), National Gallery of Art, Washington, D.C.
- Many Mansions (1994), Art Institute of Chicago
- Supermodel (1994), Museum of Fine Arts, Boston
- Our Town (1995), Crystal Bridges Museum of American Art, Bentonville, Arkansas
- Watts 1963 (1995), Saint Louis Art Museum
- Souvenir II (1997), Addison Gallery of American Art, Andover, Massachusetts
- Souvenir III (1998), San Francisco Museum of Modern Art
- Souvenir IV (1998), Whitney Museum, New York
- Untitled (1998-1999), Rubell Museum, Miami
- Heirlooms & Accessories (2002), Studio Museum in Harlem, New York
- 7am Sunday Morning (2003), Museum of Contemporary Art, Chicago
- Africa Restored (Cheryl as Cleopatra) (2003), Art Institute of Chicago
- Diptych Color Blind Test (2003), Denver Art Museum
- Gulf Stream (2003), Walker Art Center, Minneapolis
- SOB, SOB (2003), Smithsonian American Art Museum, Smithsonian Institution, Washington, D.C.
- Black Painting (2003-2006), Glenstone, Potomac, Maryland
- Untitled (2008), Harvard Art Museums, Cambridge, Massachusetts
- Untitled (Bride of Frankenstein) (2010), Fine Arts Museums of San Francisco; Los Angeles County Museum of Art; Museum of Modern Art, New York; and Pennsylvania Academy of the Fine Arts, Philadelphia
- Untitled (Frankenstein) (2010), Fine Arts Museums of San Francisco; Los Angeles County Museum of Art; Museum of Modern Art, New York; and Pennsylvania Academy of the Fine Arts, Philadelphia
- Untitled (Handsome Young Man) (2010), Minneapolis Institute of Art
- Vignette (Wishing Well) (2010), Carnegie Museum of Art, Pittsburgh; Museum of Fine Arts, Houston; Pennsylvania Academy of the Fine Arts, Philadelphia; and Walker Art Center, Minneapolis
- Untitled (Club Scene) (2013), Museum of Modern Art, New York
- Untitled (Orange Pants) (2014), The Broad, Los Angeles
- Untitled (Studio) (2014), Metropolitan Museum of Art, New York
- Untitled (policeman) (2015), Museum of Modern Art, New York
- Untitled (Gallery) (2016), Carnegie Museum of Art, Pittsburgh
- Untitled (2017), The Broad, Los Angeles
- Untitled (London Bridge) (2017), Tate, London
- Untitled (Underpainting) (2018), Glenstone, Potomac, Maryland
- Henry Louis Gates Jr (2020), Fitzwilliam Museum, Cambridge

== Personal life ==
He is married to playwright, director, and actress Cheryl Lynn Bruce. They met while Bruce was working at the Studio Museum in Harlem and Marshall was beginning an art residency there. In 1987, Marshall followed Bruce in moving to her hometown on Chicago's South Side, where they were married in 1989 at the South Side Community Art Center. His stepdaughter is United States Representative Sydney Kamlager-Dove.

== Awards and honors ==
- 1997 – MacArthur Fellowship, MacArthur Foundation
- 1999 – Honorary doctorate, Otis College of Art and Design, Los Angeles, California
- 2017 – Fifth Star Award, for his contributions to Chicago, City of Chicago.
- 2022 – Elected Honorary Royal Academician (HonRA) on 13 December 2022

== Filmography ==
=== Film ===
| Year | Film title | Role | Notes |
|---|---|---|---|
| 1991 | Daughters of the Dust | Production designer | |

=== Television ===
| Year | Television show | Episode | Type | Notes |
|---|---|---|---|---|
| 2001 | Art:21 - Art In the Twenty First Century | Identity (Season 1) | Television | PBS art documentary. |
