= Just Right for Me =

Single by Monica featuring Lil Wayne

from the album Code Red
- Released: May 4, 2015
- Length: 3:20
- Label: RCA
- Songwriters: Monica Brown; Dwayne Carter; Jocelyn Donald; Jamal Jones; Warren Moore; Smokey Robinson
- Producer: Polow da Don

Monica singles chronology
"Without You" (2012)	"Just Right for Me" (2015)	"Commitment" (2019)

Lil Wayne singles chronology
"How Many Times" (2015)	"Just Right for Me" (2015)	"Why I Do It" (2015)

Music video
- "Just Right for Me" on YouTube

"Just Right for Me" is a song by American singer Monica, featuring guest vocals from rapper Lil Wayne. It was written by Monica and Lil Wayne along with Jozzy and Jamal "Polow da Don" Jones for her seventh studio album Code Red (2015), while production was helmed by the latter. The song contains a sample of the 1968 song "Much Better Off" by American vocal group Smokey Robinson and The Miracles. Due to the inclusion of the sample, its writers Warren "Pete" Moore and Smokey Robinson are also credited as songwriters.

The song was released as Code Red's first and only single in May 2015. "Just Right for Me" received generally positive reviews from music critics but was less successful on the charts, reaching number 18 on the US Billboard R&B/Hip-Hop Airplay and number twelve on the Adult R&B Songs chart, becoming Monica's fourth top twenty entry but also her lowest-charting lead single yet. An accompanying music video for "Just Right for Me" was directed by The Rite Brothers and filmed at Lil Wayne's private skatepark in Miami in late 2015.

== Critical reception ==
Upon its premiere, Vibe remarked that "the rambunctious club track starts out with a stellar verse from Weezy – and Monica’s buttery vocals bring it all home". Fuse found that "Monica sounds bulletproof as she belts about fully accepting a loved one" on the track. Matthew Trammell from The Fader felt that "Just Right For Me" recalls "the summertime spunk of "So Gone" with the earnestness that buoyed her debut album, Miss Thang. The Polow Da Don-produced single loops up a warm soul sample, and Lil Wayne holds the door open." Essence writer Gia Peppers declared the "hard-hitting, hip hop fused song [a] sure to be a summer hit."

== Commercial performance ==
"Just Right for Me" world premiered on Los Angeles radio station Power 106's programme Lift Off on May 18, 2015. It peaked at number 12 on the US Adult R&B Songs chart, becoming Monica's fourth single to reach the top twenty, while also reaching number 18 on the R&B/Hip-Hop Airplay chart. In 2016, Monica released the original remix version of the song on her SoundCloud account with an additional verse from rapper 2 Chainz.

== Music video ==
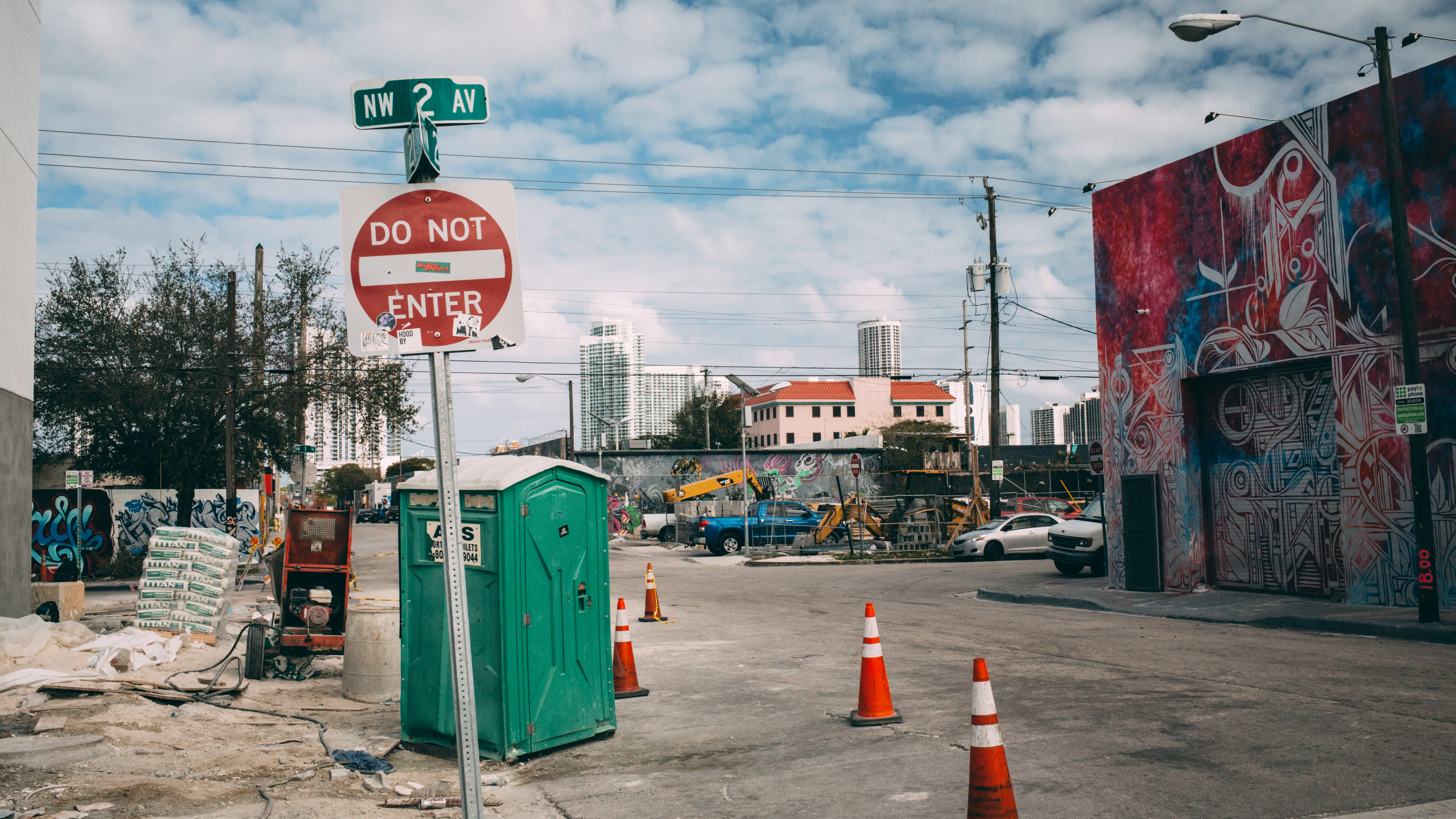
The music video for "Just Right for Me" was filmed at Lil Wayne's skatepark in Wynwood, Miami.

The music video for "Just Right for Me" was filmed by The Rite Brothers, consisting of director Colin Quinn and first assistant director Sam Green. Primarily filmed at Lil Wayne's private skatepark in the Wynwood section of Miami, it was premiered on November 5, 2015. Commenting on its release, Monica stated: "I am very proud of the 'Just Right for Me' video because it showcases my love for R&B music and Tunechi's love for skateboarding in a fun, raw and authentic way".

== Live performances ==
Monica first performed "Just Right for Me" on the inaugural broadcast of the NBPA Players Awards that aired on BET on July 19, 2015. She performed the song a second time on The Wendy Williams Show along with "Don't Take It Personal" on December 17, 2015.

== Credits and personnel ==
Credits adapted from the liner notes of Code Red.

- Siraaj "Encore" Aziz – horns
- Blanco "The Ear" Brown – vocal producer
- Monica Brown – vocals, writer
- Dwayne "Lil Wayne" Carter – vocals, writer
- Jocelyn Donald – writer
- Abel Garibaldi – mixing
- Jamal "Polow da Don" Jones – producer, writer
- Chris "KingMixx" King – recording
- Warren "Pete" Moore – writer
- Smokey Robinson – writer
- Jonathan "Anonymous" Solone-Myvett – programming

== Charts ==
Chart performance for "Just Right for Me"
Chart (2015)	Peak position
US R&B/Hip-Hop Airplay (Billboard)	18

== Release history ==
Release dates and formats for "Just Right for Me"
Country	Date	Format	Label	Ref.
United States	June 26, 2015	Digital download	RCA	
United States	June 30, 2015	Urban AC	RCA	
