= Love Records (Sean Combs) =

American record label

- Founded: 2022 (4 years ago)
- Founder: Sean Combs
- Status: Active
- Distributor: Motown (2022–present)
- Genre: R&B; East Coast hip-hop
- Country of origin: United States
- Location: New York City, U.S.

Love Records is an American record label founded by rapper Sean "Diddy" Combs in 2022. The label was created to release Combs's fifth album, The Love Album: Off the Grid (2023), though American songwriter Jozzy has signed with the label and released one extended play (EP).

== History ==
=== Beginnings (2021–2024) ===
After his last album, 11 11 in 2014, Sean Combs would take a long break from making music. In 2021, rumors circulated that Combs was making a musical return. In 2022, Combs announced the formation of Love Records, in a joint venture with Motown, as a successor to his Bad Boy Records brand. Both Motown and Love were slated to release Combs' fifth album, The Love Album: Off the Grid (2023).

Love Records' first artist, Jozzy, was signed on September 12, 2022. Despite the label's deal with Motown, Combs' fifth album was released solely through Love Records on September 15, 2023. It moderately entered the Billboard 200 and received mostly positive reviews from critics, earning a nomination for Best Progressive R&B Album at the 66th Annual Grammy Awards.

=== Hiatus (2024–present) ===
In March 2024, several of Combs' properties were raided by the Department of Homeland Security, and that September he was charged with federal sex trafficking, transportation to engage in prostitution, and racketeering. The search found various narcotics, including ketamine, ecstasy, and GHB. His trial began on May 5, 2025, and on July 2, he was found guilty of transportation to engage in prostitution and not guilty on racketeering and sex trafficking charges, thus putting a pause on Love Records.

== Roster ==
=== Current ===
Act	Year signed	Releases under Love
Sean Combs	Founder (2022)	1
Jozzy	2022	1

== Discography ==
Year	Information
2023	Diddy - The Love Album: Off the Grid: Released: September 15, 2023; RIAA certification: -; Chart positions: No. 19 Billboard
2023	Jozzy - Songs for Women, Free Game for N****s EP: Released: 2023; RIAA certification: -; Chart positions: -
