= Sean Combs discography =

Hip hop recording artist discography

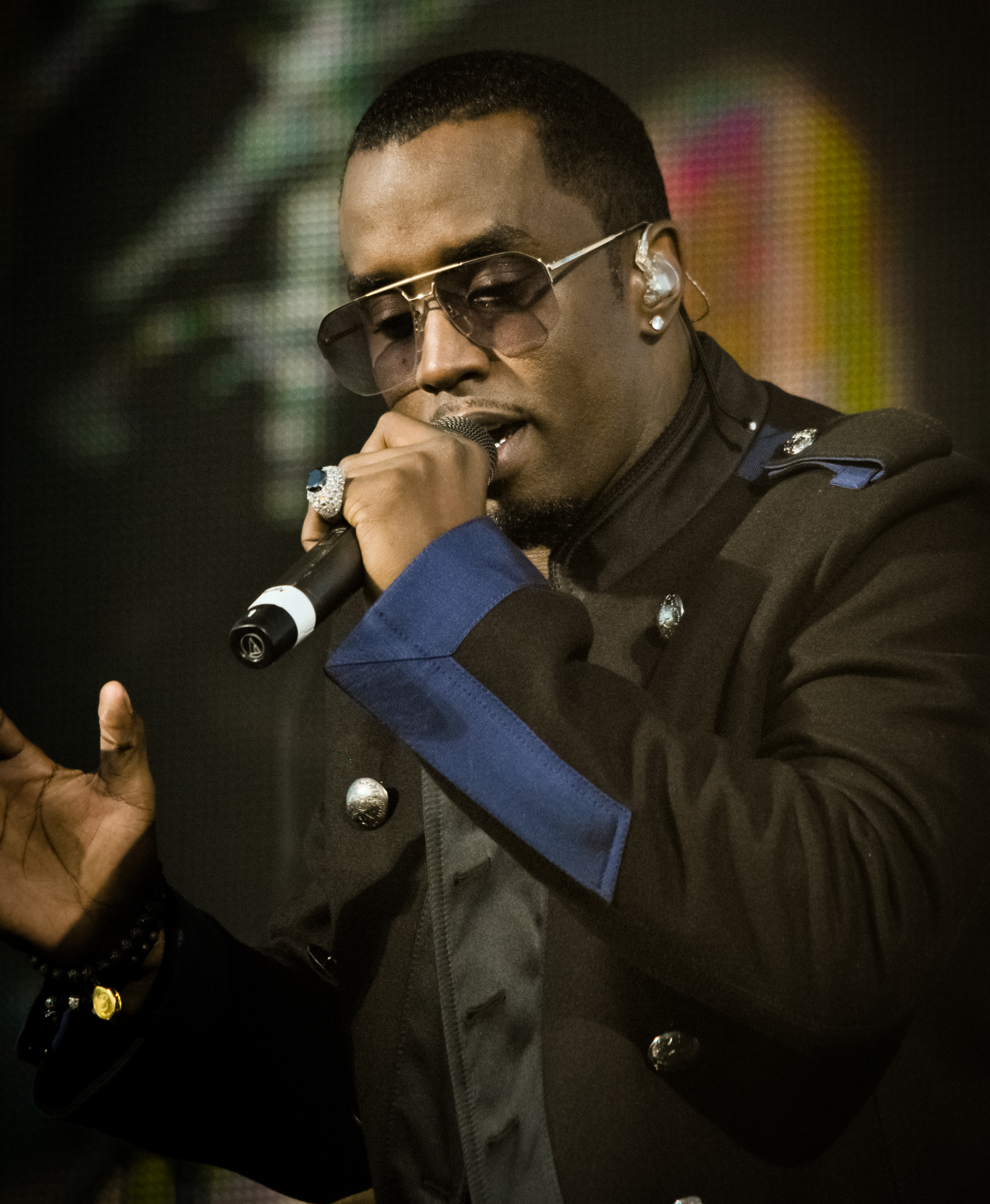
- Combs in 2010
- Studio albums: 5
- Singles: 72
- Collaborative: 2
- Remix albums: 1

The discography of American rapper and record producer Sean Combs, known professionally as Diddy (formerly Puff Daddy and P. Diddy), (Note: Combs adopted the stage name "Puff Daddy" in 1996 for his first release and would later change his name to "P. Diddy" in 2001 and to "Diddy" in 2005. This article uses "Combs" for consistency.) consists of five studio albums, two collaborative albums, one remix album and 72 singles (including 33 as a lead artist and 39 as a featured artist).

Combs began his musical career as an intern at the New York City-based record label Uptown Records. During this time, Combs served as executive producer for Mary J. Blige's first two albums—What's the 411? (1992) and My Life (1994)—and was assigned artists and repertoire duties for R&B act Jodeci. In 1993, he was fired from Uptown and launched his own label, Bad Boy Records, shortly after. He also took then-unknown Uptown signee, the Notorious B.I.G., along with him to Bad Boy. In August 1994, the Notorious B.I.G. released the song "Juicy"; produced by Combs and one of the label's first releases, it became one of the most influential songs in hip hop music. Combs served as the primary producer of B.I.G.'s debut studio album and the label's first LP release: Ready to Die (1994). Its critical and commercial success brought Bad Boy to the forefront of mainstream hip-hop, with Combs also producing the album's signature hits "Big Poppa" and "One More Chance".

Following B.I.G.'s success during his lifetime, Combs become widely known as his manager and hype man, leading Combs himself to debut as a lead performer with his 1996 single, "Can't Nobody Hold Me Down". Prior, he made recording appearances on Super Cat's 1993 single "Dolly My Baby" and TLC's 1994 album CrazySexyCool, but predominantly acted as a record producer or backing vocalist. "Can't Nobody Hold Me Down"—which also introduced Combs' next protégé Mase—proved to be commercially successful, peaking atop the Billboard Hot 100 by August of the following year, where it remained for six consecutive weeks. By this time, the Bad Boy label had signed other acts, including Faith Evans, Total, the Lox, 112, Black Rob, Craig Mack, and Carl Thomas.

In March 1997, the Notorious B.I.G. was fatally shot by an unknown assailant, prompting Combs to make his second commercial single a tribute song titled "I'll Be Missing You". Featuring guest appearances from Bad Boy acts Faith Evans and R&B group 112, the song became the first ever hip-hop song to debut atop the Billboard Hot 100, while also peaking 15 international charts. Furthermore, it won Best Rap Performance by a Duo or Group at the 40th Annual Grammy Awards and remains one of the best selling singles of all time. The song and its parent album, No Way Out (1997), have yielded Combs' furthest critical and commercial success. The album was credited to "Puff Daddy & the Family", which referred to Combs and other Bad Boy signees, who were showcased extensively.

In 1997, Combs spent the most weeks atop the Billboard Hot 100 of any musical act that year, with 19 weeks, and 26 when including the Combs-produced songs "Hypnotize" by B.I.G. and "Honey" by Mariah Carey. Furthermore, he became the first hip hop artist to replace himself at the position, with "Mo Money Mo Problems" replacing "I'll Be Missing You" the following week. In 1998, Combs released the singles "Victory" (featuring the Notorious B.I.G. and Busta Rhymes) and "Come with Me" (featuring Led Zeppelin guitarist Jimmy Page) for the Godzilla soundtrack, while also cultivating acts on the Bad Boy label and producing material for other artists.

Combs' second and third studio albums, Forever (1999) and The Saga Continues... (2001) were met with commercial success, albeit less than his previous work, and generally mixed reviews. By this point and onward, Combs and Bad Boy Records received criticism for being seen as the leading exploiter of the dumbing down and over-commercialization of hip hop, as well as over-reliance on guest appearances and samples of older hits. Critics would often praise the production value and catchiness, but become weary of Combs' public figure and character, citing the remarkably shallow nature of his lyrical persona, along with an overall lack of originality. Combs and the Bad Boy label were also subjects of a style over substance argument.

Combs' fourth studio album, Press Play (2006), peaked atop Billboard 200, becoming his second and final release to do so. In 2009, he formed the musical group Diddy – Dirty Money with R&B singers Kalenna Harper and Dawn Richard. The trio signed with Bad Boy, which was an imprint of Interscope Records at the time, as a collaborative act and released four singles—"Love Come Down", "Angels", "Hello Good Morning" (featuring T.I.), "Loving You No More" (featuring Drake)—to moderate success. Their fifth single, "Coming Home" (featuring Skylar Grey), was released in November 2010 and peaked at number 11 on the Billboard Hot 100. The following month, their debut studio album, Last Train to Paris (2010), was released to critical and commercial success—peaking at number seven on the Billboard 200. Despite this, the trio disbanded two years later, and Combs has since admitted that the album's reception, which he deemed to be disappointing, dampened his musical inspiration for several years.

== Albums ==
=== Studio albums ===
List of studio albums, with selected chart positions, sales figures and certifications
Title	Album details	Peak chart positions										Sales	Certifications
Title	Album details	US	AUS	CAN	FRA	GER	NLD	NZ	SWE	SWI	UK	Sales	Certifications
No Way Out (with the Family)	Released: July 22, 1997 (US); Label: Bad Boy, Arista; Formats: CD, LP, cassette, digital download	1	17	1	18	2	6	12	6	1	8	US: 7,000,000	RIAA: 7× Platinum; ARIA: Gold; BPI: Gold; IFPI SWE: Gold; IFPI SWI: Platinum; MC: 6× Platinum; NVPI: Gold; SNEP: Gold
Forever	Released: August 24, 1999 (US); Labels: Bad Boy, Arista; Format: CD, LP, cassette, digital download	2	17	4	14	4	26	—	40	7	9		RIAA: Platinum; BPI: Gold; MC: Gold
The Saga Continues... (with The Bad Boy Family)	Released: June 19, 2001 (US); Labels: Bad Boy, Arista; Formats: CD, LP, cassette, digital download	2	—	19	14	14	85	—	—	43	89		BPI: Silver; MC: Gold
Press Play	Released: October 17, 2006 (US); Labels: Bad Boy, Atlantic; Formats: CD, LP, digital download	1	41	17	31	32	58	—	46	9	11		RIAA: Gold; BPI: Gold
The Love Album: Off the Grid	Released: September 15, 2023; Labels: Love; Formats: LP, digital download, streaming	19	—	56	—	—	—	—	—	57	— (Note: "The Love Album: Off the Grid" did not enter the UK Albums Chart Top 100 but debuted and peaked at number 33 on the UK Album Downloads Chart on September 22, 2023.)		
"—" denotes a recording that did not chart or was not released in that territory.

=== Collaboration albums ===
List of collaboration albums, with selected chart positions, sales figures and certifications
Title	Album details	Peak chart positions						Sales
Title	Album details	US	CAN	FRA	GER	SWI	UK	Sales
Last Train to Paris (with Dawn Richard & Kalenna Harper; as Diddy – Dirty Money)	Released: December 14, 2010 (US); Labels: Bad Boy, Interscope; Formats: CD, LP, digital download	7	67	194	52	61	24	US: 270,000
11 11 (with Guy Gerber)	Released: August 20, 2014 (worldwide); Label: Rumors; Formats: CD, LP, digital download	—	—	—	—	—	—	
"—" denotes a recording that did not chart or was not released in that territory.

=== Remix albums ===
List of remix albums, with selected chart positions and certifications
Title	Album details	Peak chart positions								Certifications
Title	Album details	US	AUS	CAN	FRA	NLD	NZ	SWI	UK	Certifications
We Invented the Remix	Released: May 14, 2002 (US); Labels: Bad Boy, Arista; Formats: CD, LP, cassette, digital download	1	36	8	42	50	37	56	17	RIAA: Platinum; BPI: Gold

=== Mixtapes ===
List of mixtapes, with selected chart positions
Title	Album details	Peak chart positions	
Title	Album details	US R&B	US Rap
MMM (Money Making Mitch)	Released: November 4, 2015; Label: Bad Boy, Epic; Formats: CD, LP, digital download	45	23

== Singles ==
=== As lead artist ===
List of singles as lead artist, with selected chart positions and certifications, showing year released and album name
Title	Year	Peak chart positions										Certifications	Album
Title	Year	US	AUS	CAN	FRA	GER	NLD	NZ	SWE	SWI	UK	Certifications	Album
"Can't Nobody Hold Me Down" (featuring Mase)	1997	1	27	1	—	23	59	11	—	37	19	RIAA: 2× Platinum	No Way Out
"I'll Be Missing You" (with Faith Evans, featuring 112)	1997	1	1	1	2	1	1	1	1	1	1	RIAA: 3× Platinum; ARIA: 2× Platinum; BPI: 3× Platinum; BVMI: 3× Platinum; IFPI SWE: 2× Platinum; IFPI SWI: 2× Platinum; MC: Platinum; NVPI: 2× Platinum; RMNZ: 3× Platinum; SNEP: Gold	No Way Out
"It's All About the Benjamins" (Remix) (featuring The Notorious B.I.G., Lil' Kim and The LOX)	1997	—	—	—	—	—	25	—	51	—	18		No Way Out
"Been Around the World" (featuring The Notorious B.I.G. and Mase)	1997	2	48	2	—	41	22	3	22	39	20	RIAA: Platinum; RMNZ: Platinum	No Way Out
"Victory" (featuring The Notorious B.I.G. and Busta Rhymes)	1998	19	—	—	—	67	—	19	—	—	—	RIAA: Gold	No Way Out
"Come with Me" (featuring Jimmy Page)	1998	4	10	7	8	3	8	3	12	2	2	RIAA: Platinum; ARIA: Gold; BPI: Silver; BVMI: Platinum; IFPI SWE: Gold; IFPI SWI: Gold; RMNZ: Gold; SNEP: Silver	Godzilla: The Album
"P.E. 2000" (featuring Hurricane G)	1999	— (Note: "P.E. 2000" did not enter the Billboard Hot 100, but peaked at number 11 on the Bubbling Under Hot 100 Singles chart.)	79	—	—	14	42	27	—	24	13		Forever
"Satisfy You" (featuring R. Kelly)	1999	2	31	—	19	2	4	—	38	6	8	RIAA: Gold; BPI: Silver; BVMI: Gold	Forever
"Best Friend" (featuring Mario Winans)	2000	59	—	—	50	35	52	—	—	44	24		Forever
"Let's Get It" (with G. Dep, featuring Black Rob)	2001	80	—	—	—	—	—	—	—	—	—		The Saga Continues... and Child of the Ghetto
"Bad Boy for Life" (featuring Black Rob and Mark Curry)	2001	33	20	—	—	6	17	—	32	20	13	BPI: Silver; RMNZ: Gold	The Saga Continues...
"Diddy" (featuring The Neptunes)	2001	66	31	—	—	59	—	—	—	84	19		The Saga Continues...
"I Need a Girl (Part One)" (featuring Usher and Loon)	2002	2	5	—	9	8	3	9	17	5	4	ARIA: Gold; IFPI SWI: Gold; RMNZ: Gold	We Invented the Remix
"I Need a Girl (Part Two)" (featuring Ginuwine, Loon Mimi "Mimete" Hanyu of The Westside Girls, Tammy Ruggieri and Mario Winans)	2002	4	—	3	—	—	3	—	—	—	4	BPI: Gold; RMNZ: Platinum	We Invented the Remix
"Dance with Us" (with Brandy, featuring Bow Wow)	2002	—	—	—	—	—	—	—	—	—	—		The Wild Thornberrys Movie soundtrack
"Let's Get Ill" (featuring Kelis)	2003	—	37	—	—	—	—	—	—	—	25		Non-album single
"Shake Ya Tailfeather" (with Nelly and Murphy Lee)	2003	1	3	14	—	26	20	3	17	10	10	RIAA: Gold; ARIA: Platinum; RMNZ: Gold	Bad Boys II soundtrack
"Show Me Your Soul" (with Lenny Kravitz, Loon and Pharrell)	2003	—	45	—	—	61	—	—	—	62	35		Bad Boys II soundtrack
"Come to Me" (featuring Nicole Scherzinger)	2006	9	11	—	15	6	45	25	44	3	4	BPI: Silver; BVMI: Gold	Press Play
"Tell Me" (featuring Christina Aguilera)	2006	47	13	—	—	5	13	—	—	7	8	BPI: Silver	Press Play
"Last Night" (featuring Keyshia Cole)	2007	10	53	23	99	25	37	—	—	33	14	BPI: Silver; RMNZ: Gold	Press Play
"Through the Pain (She Told Me)" (featuring Mario Winans)	2007	—	—	—	—	46	—	—	—	—	50		Press Play
"Diddy Boppin'" (featuring Yung Joc and Xplicit)	2009	—	—	—	—	—	—	—	—	—	—		Non-album single
"Angels" (with Dirty Money, featuring The Notorious B.I.G.)	2009	— (Note: "Angels" did not enter the Billboard Hot 100, but peaked at number 16 on the Bubbling Under Hot 100 Singles chart.)	—	—	—	—	—	—	—	—	—		Last Train to Paris
"Love Come Down" (with Dirty Money)	2009	—	—	—	—	—	—	—	—	—	—		Non-album single
"Hello Good Morning" (with Dirty Money, featuring T.I.)	2010	27	94	55	—	—	—	—	—	65	22	RIAA: Gold	Last Train to Paris
"Loving You No More" (with Dirty Money, featuring Drake)	2010	91	—	—	—	—	—	—	—	—	—		Last Train to Paris
"Coming Home" (with Dirty Money, featuring Skylar Grey)	2010	11	4	7	8	4	14	5	26	1	4	RIAA: 2× Platinum; ARIA: 5× Platinum; BPI: Platinum; BVMI: Platinum; IFPI SWI: Platinum; RMNZ: Gold	Last Train to Paris
"Your Love" (with Dirty Money, featuring Trey Songz)	2011	—	—	—	—	—	—	—	—	—	—		Last Train to Paris
"Ass on the Floor" (with Dirty Money, featuring Swizz Beatz)	2011	—	—	—	—	—	—	—	—	—	187		Last Train to Paris
"Big Homie" (featuring Rick Ross and French Montana)	2014	—	—	—	—	—	—	—	—	—	—		Non-album singles
"I Want the Love" (featuring Meek Mill)	2014	—	—	—	—	—	—	—	—	—	—		Non-album singles
"Finna Get Loose" (featuring Pharrell)	2015	— (Note: "Finna Get Loose" did not enter the Billboard Hot 100, but peaked at number 15 on the Bubbling Under Hot 100 Singles chart.)	—	—	—	—	—	—	—	—	—		Non-album singles
"Workin"	2015	—	—	—	—	—	—	—	—	—	—		MMM (Money Making Mitch)
"Money Ain't a Problem" (featuring French Montana)	2015	—	—	—	—	—	—	—	—	—	—		MMM (Money Making Mitch)
"Watcha Gon' Do?" (featuring The Notorious B.I.G. and Rick Ross)	2017	—	—	—	—	—	—	—	—	—	—		Non-album single
"Gotta Move On" (featuring Bryson Tiller)	2022	79	—	—	—	—	—	— (Note: "Gotta Move On" did not enter the NZ Top 40 Singles Chart, but peaked at number 23 on the NZ Hot Singles Chart.)	—	—	—		The Love Album: Off the Grid (Extended)
"Sex in the Porsche" (featuring PartyNextDoor)	2022	—	—	—	—	—	—	—	—	—	—		The Love Album: Off the Grid (Extended)
"Creepin'" (Remix) (with Metro Boomin and the Weeknd featuring 21 Savage)	2023	—	—	—	—	—	—	—	—	—	—		The Love Album: Off the Grid (Extended)
"Act Bad" (with Fabolous and City Girls)	2023	—	—	—	—	—	—	—	—	—	—		Non-album single
"Another One of Me" (with the Weeknd and French Montana featuring 21 Savage)	2023	87	—	83	—	—	—	— (Note: "Another One of Me" did not enter the NZ Top 40 Singles Chart, but peaked at number 11 on the NZ Hot Singles Chart.)	—	—	98		The Love Album: Off the Grid
"—" denotes a recording that did not chart or was not released in that territory.

=== As featured artist ===
List of singles as featured artist, with selected chart positions and certifications, showing year released and album name
Title	Year	Peak chart positions										Certifications	Album
Title	Year	US	AUS	CAN	FRA	GER	NLD	NZ	SWE	SWI	UK	Certifications	Album
"No Time" (Lil' Kim featuring Puff Daddy)	1996	18	—	—	—	—	—	—	—	—	45	RIAA: Gold	Hard Core
"Mo Money Mo Problems" (The Notorious B.I.G. featuring Puff Daddy and Mase)	1997	1	10	2	36	11	2	2	5	8	6	RIAA: Platinum; ARIA: Gold; BPI: Silver; RMNZ: 3× Platinum	Life After Death
"Someone" (SWV featuring Puff Daddy)	1997	19	—	28	—	—	—	28	—	—	34		Release Some Tension
"Lookin' at Me" (Mase featuring Puff Daddy)	1998	8	—	17	—	—	—	18	—	—	—	RIAA: Gold	Harlem World
"Don Cartagena" (Fat Joe featuring Puff Daddy)	1998	— (Note: "Don Cartagena" did not enter the Billboard Hot 100, but peaked at number two on the Bubbling Under Hot 100 Singles chart.)	—	—	—	—	—	—	—	—	—		Don Cartagena
"Nothin' Move But the Money" (Mic Geronimo featuring Puff Daddy and Kelly Price)	1998	70	—	—	—	—	—	—	—	—	—		Vendetta
"All Night Long" (Faith Evans featuring Puff Daddy)	1999	9	—	—	—	11	17	—	55	30	23		Keep the Faith
"Hate Me Now" (Nas featuring Puff Daddy)	1999	62	55	—	—	11	—	29	—	—	23		I Am...
"Notorious B.I.G." (The Notorious B.I.G. featuring Puff Daddy and Lil' Kim)	1999	82	51	—	95	56	—	—	44	68	16		Born Again
"Son of a Gun (I Betcha Think This Song Is About You)" (Janet Jackson and Carly Simon featuring Missy Elliott and P. Diddy)	2001	28	20	—	—	69	34	49	48	56	13		All for You
"Trade It All, Pt. 2" (Fabolous featuring P. Diddy and Jagged Edge)	2002	20	—	—	—	79	—	—	—	—	—		Street Dreams
"Pass the Courvoisier, Part II" (Busta Rhymes featuring P. Diddy and Pharrell)	2002	11	43	30	—	27	—	—	—	58	16		Genesis
"Bigger Business" (Swizz Beatz featuring Birdman, Jadakiss, P. Diddy, Snoop Dogg, Ron Isley, Cassidy and TQ)	2002	—	—	—	—	—	—	—	—	—	—		Swizz Beatz Presents G.H.E.T.T.O. Stories
"Bump, Bump, Bump" (B2K featuring P. Diddy)	2002	1	4	—	7	7	10	10	53	2	11	ARIA: Platinum; BPI: Silver; BVMI: Gold; SNEP: Silver	Pandemonium!
"Do That..." (Birdman featuring P. Diddy, Mannie Fresh and Tateeze)	2002	33	—	—	—	—	—	—	—	—	—		Birdman
"Summertime" (Beyoncé featuring P. Diddy)	2003	— (Note: "Summertime" did not enter the Billboard Hot 100, but peaked at number eight on the Bubbling Under Hot 100 Singles chart.)	—	—	—	—	—	—	—	—	—		The Fighting Temptations soundtrack
"I Don't Wanna Know" (Mario Winans featuring Enya and P. Diddy)	2004	2	2	—	4	1	1	3	11	2	1	RIAA: Gold; ARIA: Platinum; BPI: Silver; RMNZ: Gold	Hurt No More
"You Don't Want Drama" (8Ball & MJG featuring P. Diddy)	2004	— (Note: "You Don't Want Drama" did not enter the Billboard Hot 100, but peaked at number three on the Bubbling Under Hot 100 Singles chart.)	—	—	—	—	—	—	—	—	—		Living Legends
"Breathe, Stretch, Shake" (Mase featuring P. Diddy)	2004	28	—	—	—	—	—	—	—	41	28	RIAA: Gold	Welcome Back
"Run This City" (Clinton Sparks featuring P. Diddy and Miri Ben-Ari)	2005	—	—	—	—	—	—	—	—	—	—		Maybe You've Been Brainwashed
"What You Been Drankin' On?" (Jim Jones featuring P. Diddy, Paul Wall and Jha Jha)	2005	—	—	—	—	—	—	—	—	—	—		Harlem: Diary of a Summer
"Nasty Girl" (The Notorious B.I.G. featuring Diddy, Nelly, Jagged Edge and Avery Storm)	2005	44	15	—	22	8	28	7	40	14	1	BPI: 2× Platinum; RMNZ: Platinum	Duets: The Final Chapter
"Get Buck in Here" (DJ Felli Fel featuring Diddy, Akon, Ludacris and Lil Jon)	2007	41	—	58	—	—	—	—	—	—	—	RIAA: Gold	Non-album single
"5000 Ones" (DJ Drama featuring Nelly, T.I., Diddy, Yung Joc, Willie the Kid, Young Jeezy and Twista)	2007	—	—	—	—	—	—	—	—	—	—		Gangsta Grillz: The Album
"Take You There" (Donnie Klang featuring Diddy)	2008	— (Note: "Take You There" did not enter the Billboard Hot 100, but peaked at number 10 on the Bubbling Under Hot 100 Singles chart.)	—	—	—	—	—	—	—	—	—		Just a Rolling Stone
"Imma Put It on Her" (Day26 featuring Diddy and Yung Joc)	2009	79	—	—	—	—	—	—	—	—	—		Forever in a Day
"Must Be Love" (Cassie featuring Puff Daddy)	2009	—	—	—	—	—	—	—	—	—	—		Non-album single
"Million Dollar Girl" (Trina featuring Diddy and Keri Hilson)	2010	—	—	—	—	—	—	—	—	—	—		Amazin'
"O Let's Do It" (Remix) (Waka Flocka Flame featuring Diddy, Rick Ross and Gucci Mane)	2010	—	—	—	—	—	—	—	—	—	—		Non-album singles
"All I Do Is Win" (Remix) (DJ Khaled featuring T-Pain, Diddy, Nicki Minaj, Rick Ross, Busta Rhymes, Fabolous, Jadakiss, Fat Joe and Swizz Beatz)	2010	—	—	—	—	—	—	—	—	—	—		Non-album singles
"Money Money Money" (Red Café featuring Diddy and Fabolous)	2010	—	—	—	—	—	—	—	—	—	—		Non-album singles
"Someone to Love Me (Naked)" (Mary J. Blige featuring Diddy and Lil Wayne)	2011	— (Note: "Someone to Love Me (Naked)" did not enter the Billboard Hot 100, but peaked at number eight on the Bubbling Under Hot 100 Singles chart.)	—	—	—	—	—	—	—	—	—		My Life II... The Journey Continues (Act 1)
"I'm on You" (Timati featuring Diddy, Dirty Money and DJ Antoine)	2011	—	—	—	—	50	—	—	—	67	—		SWAGG
"Let It Go (Dope Boy)" (Red Café featuring Diddy)	2011	—	—	—	—	—	—	—	—	—	—		ShakeDown
"Shot Caller" (Remix) (French Montana featuring Diddy, Rick Ross and Charlie Rock)	2012	—	—	—	—	—	—	—	—	—	—		Non-album single
"Same Damn Time" (Remix) (Future featuring Diddy and Ludacris)	2012	—	—	—	—	—	—	—	—	—	—		Pluto 3D
"Scream & Shout" (Hit-Boy Remix) (will.i.am featuring Britney Spears, Hit-Boy, Waka Flocka Flame, Lil Wayne and Diddy)	2013	—	—	—	—	—	—	—	—	—	—		#willpower
"Don't Shoot" (The Game featuring Rick Ross, 2 Chainz, Diddy, Fabolous, Wale, DJ Khaled, Swizz Beatz, Yo Gotti, Currensy, Problem, King Pharaoh and TGT)	2014	—	—	—	—	—	—	—	—	—	—		Non-album singles
"#Wheresthelove" (The Black Eyed Peas featuring Diddy, Justin Timberlake, Usher, Jamie Foxx, The Game, Mary J. Blige, Jessie J, Jessica Szohr, Nicole Scherzinger, DJ Khaled, Andra Day, Tori Kelly, Ty Dolla $ign, Jaden Smith and ASAP Rocky)	2016	—	—	—	—	—	—	—	—	—	—		Non-album singles
"Bottles Up" (Jeezy featuring Puff Daddy)	2017	—	—	—	—	—	—	—	—	—	—		Pressure
"—" denotes a recording that did not chart or was not released in that territory.

== Other charted and certified songs ==
List of songs, with selected chart positions, showing year released and album name
Title	Year	Peak chart positions					Certifications	Album
Title	Year	US Bubb.	US R&B/ HH	US Rap	US R&B	US Rhy.	Certifications	Album
"Señorita"	1997	—	—	—	—	34		No Way Out
"I Don't Know" (Usher featuring P. Diddy)	2001	—	68	—	—	—		8701
"Roll with Me" (featuring 8Ball & MJG and Faith Evans)	2001	—	— (Note: "Roll with Me" did not enter the Hot R&B/Hip-Hop Songs chart, but peaked at number 25 on the Bubbling Under R&B/Hip-Hop Singles chart.)	—	—	—		The Saga Continues...
"I Need a Girl (To Bella)" (featuring Loon, Lo & Jack and Mario Winans)	2001	—	— (Note: "I Need a Girl (To Bella)" did not enter the Hot R&B/Hip-Hop Songs chart, but peaked at number nine on the Bubbling Under R&B/Hip-Hop Singles chart.)	—	—	—	BPI: Silver	The Saga Continues...
"Stop Playin' Games" (8Ball featuring P. Diddy)	2001	—	64	—	—	—		Almost Famous
"American Dream" (featuring David Bowie, Black Rob, Big Azz Ko, Kain Cioffie, and G. Dep)	2001	—	—	—	—	—		Training Day soundtrack
"And We" (featuring Black Rob, Big Azz Ko, Kain Cioffie, G. Dep, Foxy Brown, Craig Mack and The Mighty Ha)	2002	—	— (Note: "And We" did not enter the Hot R&B/Hip-Hop Songs chart, but peaked at number two on the Bubbling Under R&B/Hip-Hop Singles chart.)	—	—	—		Barbershop soundtrack
"After School" (LL Cool J featuring P. Diddy)	2002	—	— (Note: "After School" did not enter the Hot R&B/Hip-Hop Songs chart, but peaked at number 25 on the Bubbling Under R&B/Hip-Hop Singles chart.)	—	—	—		10
"Love & Life Intro" (Mary J. Blige featuring Jay-Z and P. Diddy)	2003	—	— (Note: "Love & Life Intro" did not enter the Hot R&B/Hip-Hop Songs chart, but peaked at number 21 on the Bubbling Under R&B/Hip-Hop Singles chart.)	—	—	—		Love & Life
"Hooked" (Mary J. Blige featuring P. Diddy)	2003	—	54	—	—	—		Love & Life
"Girl I'm a Bad Boy" (Fat Joe featuring P. Diddy and Dre)	2003	22	69	25	—	27		Bad Boys II soundtrack
"Victory 2004" (with The Notorious B.I.G., 50 Cent, Lloyd Banks and Busta Rhymes)	2004	—	61	—	—	—		Bad Boy's 10th Anniversary... The Hits
"The Godfather" (featuring Black Rob and G. Dep)	2005	—	— (Note: "The Godfather" did not enter the Hot R&B/Hip-Hop Songs chart, but peaked at number 13 on the Bubbling Under R&B/Hip-Hop Singles chart.)	—	—	—		Non-album single
"Diddy Rock" (featuring Timbaland, Twista and Shawnna)	2006	—	— (Note: "Diddy Rock" did not enter the Hot R&B/Hip-Hop Songs chart, but peaked at number 24 on the Bubbling Under R&B/Hip-Hop Singles chart.)	—	—	—		Press Play
"Everything I Love" (featuring Nas and Cee Lo Green)	2006	—	— (Note: "Everything I Love" did not enter the Hot R&B/Hip-Hop Songs chart, but peaked at number 19 on the Bubbling Under R&B/Hip-Hop Singles chart.)	—	—	—		Press Play
"Making It Hard" (featuring Mary J. Blige)	2006	—	— (Note: "Making It Hard" did not enter the Hot R&B/Hip-Hop Songs chart, but peaked at number 19 on the Bubbling Under R&B/Hip-Hop Singles chart.)	—	—	—		Press Play
"Better on the Other Side" (with Chris Brown, DJ Khalil, The Game, Polow da Don, Usher, Mario Winans and Boyz II Men)	2009	—	— (Note: "Better on the Other Side" did not enter the Hot R&B/Hip-Hop Songs chart, but peaked at number 13 on the Bubbling Under R&B/Hip-Hop Singles chart.)	—	—	—		Non-album single
"No. 1" (Rick Ross featuring Trey Songz and Diddy)	2010	—	— (Note: "No. 1" did not enter the Hot R&B/Hip-Hop Songs chart, but peaked at number 17 on the Bubbling Under R&B/Hip-Hop Singles chart.)	—	—	—		Teflon Don
"Looking for Love" (with Dirty Money, featuring Usher)	2010	—	91	—	—	—		Last Train to Paris
"Someone to Love Me" (with Dirty Money)	2010	—	82	—	—	—		Last Train to Paris
"Another One" (with Rick Ross)	2010	—	— (Note: "Another One" did not enter the Hot R&B/Hip-Hop Songs chart, but peaked at number 10 on the Bubbling Under R&B/Hip-Hop Singles chart.)	—	—	—		Ashes to Ashes
"Daddy Gettin' Money" (Fred the Godson featuring Diddy)	2011	—	— (Note: "Daddy Gettin' Money" did not enter the Hot R&B/Hip-Hop Songs chart, but peaked at number eleven on the Bubbling Under R&B/Hip-Hop Singles chart.)	—	—	—		Non-album single
"Holy Ghost" (Rick Ross featuring Diddy)	2012	—	— (Note: "Holy Ghost" did not enter the Hot R&B/Hip-Hop Songs chart, but peaked at number 16 on the Bubbling Under R&B/Hip-Hop Singles chart.)	—	—	—		Rich Forever
"Check Me Out" (Trey Songz featuring Diddy and Meek Mill)	2012	—	— (Note: "Check Me Out" did not enter the Hot R&B/Hip-Hop Songs chart, but peaked at number three on the Bubbling Under R&B/Hip-Hop Singles chart.)	—	—	—		Chapter V
"Should Be You" (Ne-Yo featuring Fabolous and Diddy)	2012	—	— (Note: "Should Be You" did not enter the Hot R&B/Hip-Hop Songs chart, but peaked at number nine on the Bubbling Under R&B/Hip-Hop Singles chart.)	—	—	—		R.E.D.
"Ocho Cinco" (French Montana featuring Machine Gun Kelly, Diddy, Red Café and Los)	2012	—	— (Note: "Ocho Cinco" did not enter the Hot R&B/Hip-Hop Songs chart, but peaked at number two on the Bubbling Under R&B/Hip-Hop Singles chart.)	—	—	—		Mac & Cheese 3
"This Is My Year" (DJ Khaled featuring A Boogie wit da Hoodie, Big Sean, Rick Ross, and Puff Daddy)	2021	20	—	—	—	—		Khaled Khaled
"What's Love" (with Nova Wav)	2023	—	—	—	21	—		The Love Album: Off the Grid
"Pick Up" (with Jacquees featuring Fabolous)	2023	—	—	—	18	—		The Love Album: Off the Grid
"Tough Love" (featuring Swae Lee)	2023	—	—	—	25	—		The Love Album: Off the Grid
"Stay Long" (with Summer Walker)	2023	—	—	—	13	—		The Love Album: Off the Grid
"Moments" (featuring Justin Bieber)	2023	—	—	—	18	—		The Love Album: Off the Grid
"Need Somebody" (with Jazmine Sullivan)	2023	—	—	—	21	—		The Love Album: Off the Grid
"—" denotes a recording that did not chart or was not released in that territory.

== Guest appearances ==
List of non-single guest appearances, with other performing artists, showing year released and album name
Title	Year	Other performer(s)	Album
"Dolly My Baby (Remix)"	1993	Super Cat, Notorious B.I.G., Mary J. Blige, 3rd Eye	—N/a
"CrazySexyCool (Interlude)"	1994	TLC	CrazySexyCool
"Sexy (Interlude)"	1994	TLC	CrazySexyCool
"Can I Get a Witness (Interlude)"	1994	TLC, Busta Rhymes	CrazySexyCool
"Intro"	1996	Total	Total
"The Body Rock"	1997	Busta Rhymes, Rampage, Mase	When Disaster Strikes...
"Puff's Intro"	1997	Mase	Harlem World
"Jealous Guys"	1997	Mase, 112	Harlem World
"Will They Die 4 U?"	1997	Mase, Lil' Kim	Harlem World
"The World is Filled..."	1997	The Notorious B.I.G., Carl Thomas, Too $hort	Life After Death
"I Know What Girls Like"	1997	Jay-Z, Lil' Kim	In My Lifetime, Vol. 1
"Can't Stop, Won't Stop"	1998	The LOX	Money, Power & Respect
"Will They Die 4 U? (Rick Rubin Remix)"	1998	Mase, Lil' Kim, and System of a Down	Chef Aid: The South Park Album
"No Matter What"	1999	Mase, Cheri Dennis	Double Up
"Do It Again"	1999	Mase	Double Up
"Get Out Our Way"	1999	Lil' Cease, Blake C	The Wonderful World of Cease A Leo
"Don't Stop"	1999	Lil' Cease	The Wonderful World of Cease A Leo
"Would You Die for Me?"	1999	The Notorious B.I.G., Lil' Kim	Born Again
"Down the Line Joint"	2000	Black Rob, G. Dep, Mark Curry, Mase	Life Story
"PD World Tour"	2000	Black Rob	Life Story
"Queen Bitch Part II"	2000	Lil' Kim	The Notorious K.I.M.
"I Don't Know"	2001	Usher	8701
"You Gets No Love"	2001	Faith Evans, Loon	Faithfully
"After School"	2002	LL Cool J	10
"Lay It Down Pt.2"	2002	8Ball, MJG, Ice Cube	Lay It Down
"P. Diddy Intro"	2003	Loon	Loon
"Can't Talk to Her"	2003	Loon, Joe Hooker	Loon
"Do Your Thang"	2003	Biz Markie	Weekend Warrior
"It Has Been Said"	2005	The Notorious B.I.G., Eminem, Obie Trice	Duets: The Final Chapter
"Me & U" (Remix)	2006	Cassie, Yung Joc	—N/a
"Bailar Conmigo"	2006	N.O.R.E., Big Mato, Don Omar	N.O.R.E. y la Familia...Ya Tú Sabe
"It’s Craccin' All Night"	2006	Tha Dogg Pound, Snoop Dogg	Cali Iz Active
"Hell Yeah"	2007	Yung Joc	Hustlenomics
"Shake It for Me"	2007	Beanie Sigel, Ghostface Killah, Peedi Peedi	The Solution
"Welcome to the Dollhouse"	2008	Danity Kane	Welcome to the Dollhouse
"Change"	2008	T-Pain, Akon, Mary J. Blige	Three Ringz
"No. 1"	2010	Rick Ross, Trey Songz	Teflon Don
"Caesar Palace"	2010	Booba	Lunatic
"Changing of the Guards"	2011	Pusha T	Fear of God II: Let Us Pray
"Holy Ghost"	2012	Rick Ross	Rich Forever
"New Bugatti"	2012	Rick Ross	Rich Forever
"Slight Work" (Remix)	2012	Wale, French Montana, Meek Mill, Mase	—N/a
"Check Me Out"	2012	Trey Songz, Meek Mill	Chapter V
"Adorn" (Ted Smooth Remix)	2012	Miguel, French Montana	—N/a
"Birthday"	2012	Rick Ross	The Black Bar Mitzvah
"Should Be You"	2012	Ne-Yo, Fabolous	R.E.D.
"Ocho Cinco"	2012	French Montana, Red Café, Machine Gun Kelly, Los	Mac & Cheese 3
"I'm a Coke Boy" (Remix)	2013	Chinx Drugz, French Montana, Rick Ross	Cocaine Riot 3
"Champions"	2013	Machine Gun Kelly	Black Flag
"Disappointed"	2013	Los, Ludacris	Becoming King
"Ballin' Out"	2013	French Montana, Jeremih	Excuse My French
"Im Leanin (Intro)"	2013	Meek Mill, Travis Scott, Birdman	Dreamchasers 3
"Kill Everything"	2013	The Game	OKE: Operation Kill Everything
"I Feel Like Pac/I Feel Like Biggie"	2013	DJ Khaled, Rick Ross, Meek Mill, T.I., Swizz Beatz	Suffering from Success
"Ain't Worried About Nothin" (Remix)	2013	French Montana, Rick Ross, Snoop Dogg	none
"Shit (Megamix)"	2013	Mike Will Made It, Future, Drake, Jeezy, T.I., Juicy J, Schoolboy Q, Pastor Troy	#MikeWillBeenTrill
"Hold Up"	2013	Trae tha Truth, T.I., Jeezy	I Am King
"Paranoid" (Remix)	2014	French Montana, Rick Ross, Chinx Drugz, Lil Durk, Jadakiss	Coke Boys 4
"Worst Nightmare"	2014	French Montana	Coke Boys 4
"Don't Shoot"	2014	The Game, Rick Ross, 2 Chainz, Fabolous, Wale, DJ Khaled, Swizz Beatz, Yo Gotti, Currensy, JasonMartin, King Pharaoh, TGT	none
"Cold Hearted"	2015	Meek Mill	Dreams Worth More Than Money
"Standing on Ferraris"	2015	The Game	The Documentary 2
"Guard Down"	2015	Ty Dolla Sign, Kanye West	Free TC
"Absurd (May 21)	2015	Hit-Boy, Gizzle, The Notorious B.I.G.	Zoomin
"You Don't Eat"	2015	Jadakiss	Top 5 Dead or Alive
"Blase (Remix)"	2015	Ty Dolla Sign, Jeezy, Juicy J	—N/a
"Old Man Wildin'"	2016	French Montana, Jadakiss, Manolo Rose	Wave Gods
"Can't Feel My Face"	2017	French Montana	—N/a
"Rap Rushmore"	2017	Mase, DJ Khaled	—N/a
"Puff Daddy intro"	2017	King Los	Moor Bars
"Senorita"	2018	King Combs	90's Baby
"Young Niggas"	2018	Nipsey Hussle	Victory Lap
"Tony Tone"	2018	ASAP Rocky	TESTING.
"Not for Radio"	2018	Nas	Nasir
"Woah"	2018	Bow Wow	—N/a
"Hope"	2018	Blood Orange, Tei Shi	Negro Swan
"So Disrespectful"	2019	Problem	S2
"Sage Wisdom From Diddy"	2019	Mike Posner	Men in Black: International
"Smile"	2020	Katy Perry	Smile (Vinyl edition)
"Full Circle"	2020	Big Sean, Key Wane	Detroit 2
"This Is My Year"	2021	DJ Khaled, A Boogie wit da Hoodie, Big Sean, Rick Ross	Khaled Khaled
"10 More Commandments"	2022	Benny The Butcher	Tana Talk 4
"The Baddest"	2022	Joey Badass	2000
"QUESTIONS, Pt. 2 2022"	2023	JasonMartin, Hit-Boy, KenTheMan	A Compton Story

== Music videos ==
=== As lead artist ===
List of music videos as lead artist, with directors, showing year released
Title	Year	Director(s)
"Can't Nobody Hold Me Down" (featuring Mase)	1997	Paul Hunter
"I'll Be Missing You" (with Faith Evans, featuring 112)	1997	Hype Williams
"It's All About the Benjamins" (Remix) (featuring The Notorious B.I.G., Lil' Kim and The LOX)	1997	Paul Hunter
"Been Around the World" (featuring The Notorious B.I.G. and Mase)	1997	Paul Hunter
"Victory" (featuring The Notorious B.I.G. and Busta Rhymes)	1998	Marcus Nispel
"Come with Me" (featuring Jimmy Page)	1998	Howard Greenhalgh
"P.E. 2000" (featuring Hurricane G)	1999	Martin Weisz
"Satisfy You" (featuring R. Kelly)	1999	Hype Williams
"Best Friend" (featuring Mario Winans)	2000	Paul Hunter
"Bad Boy for Life" (featuring Black Rob and Mark Curry)	2001	Chris Robinson
"Let's Get It" (featuring G-Dep and Black Rob)	2001	Little X
"I Need a Girl (Part One)" (featuring Usher and Loon)	2002	Benny Boom
"I Need a Girl (Part Two)" (featuring Ginuwine, Loon and Mario Winans)	2002	Benny Boom
"Shake Ya Tailfeather" (with Nelly and Murphy Lee)	2003	Chris Robinson
"Show Me Your Soul" (with Lenny Kravitz, Loon and Pharrell)	2003	Chris Robinson
"Come to Me" (featuring Nicole Scherzinger)	2006	Chris Robinson
"Tell Me" (featuring Christina Aguilera)	2006	Erik White
"Last Night" (featuring Keyshia Cole)	2007	Marc Webb
"Love in This Club" (Cameo)	2008	Brothers Strause
"Through The Pain (She Hold Me)" (featuring Mario Winans)	2008	Kim Porter
"Angels" (with Dirty Money, featuring The Notorious B.I.G.)	2009	Hype Williams
"Love Come Down" (with Dirty Money)	2009	Rage
"Angels" (Remix) (with Dirty Money, featuring Rick Ross)	2010	Parris
"Hello Good Morning" (with Dirty Money, featuring Rick Ross and T.I.)	2010	Hype Williams
"Hello Good Morning" (Remix) (with Dirty Money, featuring Rick Ross and Nicki Minaj)	2010	Hype Williams
"Loving You No More" (with Dirty Money, featuring Drake)	2010	Gil Green
"Coming Home" (with Dirty Money, featuring Skylar Grey)	2010	Rich Lee
"Someone to Love Me" (with Dirty Money)	2010	Nabil
"Ass on the Floor" (with Dirty Money, featuring Swizz Beatz)	2010	Colin Tilley
"I Hate That You Love Me" (with Dirty Money)	2011	Gil Green
"Yesterday" (with Dirty Money, featuring Chris Brown)	2011	Colin Tilley
"Your Love" (with Dirty Money, featuring Rick Ross and Trey Songz)	2011	Colin Tilley
"Looking for Love" (with Dirty Money, featuring Usher)	2011	Colin Tilley
"Big Homie" (featuring Rick Ross and French Montana)	2014	Jay Rodriguez, Rock Davis
"I Want the Love" (featuring Meek Mill)	2014	Eif Rivera
"Finna Get Loose" (featuring Pharrell)	2015	Hype Williams
"Workin"	2015	Hype Williams
"Workin" (Remix) (featuring Travis Scott and Big Sean)	2015	Hype Williams
"Blow a Check" (Bad Boy Remix) (featuring Zoey Dollaz and French Montana)	2016	Joe Weil
"Auction" (featuring Lil' Kim, Styles P and King Los)	2016	Hype Williams
"You Could Be My Lover" (featuring Gizzle and Ty Dolla Sign)	2016	Harrison Boyce
"Gotta Move On" (featuring Bryson Tiller)	2022	Spike Tey
"Gotta Move On (Queens Remix)" (featuring Yung Miami and Ashanti)	2022	Kid Art
"Diddy Freestyle"	2022	Mike Oberlies
"Whatcha Gon' Do?" (featuring Rick Ross)		Mike Oberlies
"ACT BAD" (featuring City Girls and Fabolous)	2023	Kid Art
"Another One of Me" (featuring the Weeknd, French Montana and 21 Savage)	2023	James Larese
"Closer To God" (featuring Teyana Taylor)	2023	Spike Tey
