= Hello Good Morning (disambiguation) =

"Hello Good Morning"' is a song by Dirty Money

Hello Good Morning may also refer to:

- Hello Good Morning, TV show Golden Bell Awards: 1990–99 winners list
- Hello Good Morning (Nick MacKenzie song)
