= Your Love (Diddy – Dirty Money song) =

2011 single by Diddy – Dirty Money featuring Rick Ross and Trey Songz

Single by Diddy – Dirty Money featuring Trey Songz

from the album Last Train to Paris
- Released: March 15, 2011
- Recorded: 2010
- Studio: Daddy's House Recording Studio (New York City)
- Genre: R&B; hip hop
- Length: 4:01
- Label: Bad Boy; Interscope
- Songwriters: Indira Boodram; Kesia Hollins; Alja Jackson; Jamal Jones; Jazmyn Michel Roberts; William Roberts II; Tremaine Neverson
- Producer: Polow da Don

Diddy – Dirty Money singles chronology
"Coming Home" (2010)	"Your Love" (2011)	"Ass on the Floor" (2011)

Trey Songz singles chronology
"Love Faces" (2011)	"Your Love" (2011)	"Unusual" (2011)

"Your Love" is a song by American rapper and producer Diddy and his group Dirty Money, released as the fifth single from their debut album Last Train to Paris (2010). It features R&B singer Trey Songz and production from Polow da Don. The music video version features an additional intro verse by rapper Rick Ross, who also wrote Diddy's verse on the song.

== Credits and personnel ==
The credits for "Your Love" are adapted from the liner notes of Last Train to Paris.

Recording

- Recorded at: Daddy’s House Recording Studio in New York City.
- Diddy; vocals
- Dawn Richard; vocals
- Kalenna Harper – vocals
- Polow da Don – songwriting, production
- Indira Boodram – songwriting
- Kesia Hollins; songwriting
- Jazmyn Michel; songwriting
- Alja Jackson; songwriting
- Rick Ross; songwriting
- V. Bozeman; vocal production
- Matthew Tiesta; audio engineering
- Steve Dickey; audio engineering
- Jeremy Stevenson; audio engineering, mixing
- Miles Walker; mixing
- Brian Allison; mixing assistance
- Nolan Wescott; mixing assistance

== Charts ==
=== Weekly charts ===
Chart (2011)	Peak position
US Hot R&B/Hip-Hop Songs (Billboard)	23
US Hot Rap Songs (Billboard)	20

=== Year-end charts ===
Chart (2011)	Position
US Hot R&B/Hip-Hop Songs (Billboard)	90

== Radio and release history ==
Country	Date	Format	Label
United States	March 15, 2011	Rhythmic contemporary radio	Interscope Records
