= Coming Home (Diddy – Dirty Money song) =

2010 single by Diddy – Dirty Money featuring Skylar Grey

Single by Diddy – Dirty Money featuring Skylar Grey

from the album Last Train to Paris
- B-side: "Hello Good Morning"
- Released: November 16, 2010
- Recorded: 2009–10
- Studio: Chalice, Los Angeles; End of Era, Los Angeles
- Genre: Hip hop; pop
- Length: 3:59
- Label: Bad Boy; Interscope
- Songwriters: Shawn Carter; Jermaine Cole; Alexander Grant; Holly Hafermann
- Producers: Alex da Kid; Jay-Z (co-producer)

Diddy – Dirty Money singles chronology
"Loving You No More" (2010)	"Coming Home" (2010)	"Your Love" (2011)

Skylar Grey singles chronology
"Where'd You Go" (2006)	"Coming Home" (2010)	"I Need a Doctor" (2011)

Music video
- "Coming Home" on YouTube

"Coming Home" is a song by American musical trio Diddy – Dirty Money, released by Bad Boy and Interscope Records on November 16, 2010, as the third single from their only studio album, Last Train to Paris (2010). The song contains a guest performance from American singer Skylar Grey, who co-wrote the song along with American rappers J. Cole and Jay-Z; the latter co-produced it with British record producer, Alex da Kid. A biographically written hip hop and pop ballad inspired by moments in Diddy's life, including the loss of his close friend The Notorious B.I.G., it references classic songs by Dionne Warwick, McFadden & Whitehead, and Smokey Robinson & the Miracles. Jay-Z and Kid personally gifted the song to Diddy for Last Train to Paris.

Critics praised the redemptive ballad for the personal themes and lyrics which were a snapshot of Diddy's life. Praise was also given for Grey's soft vocals, which complemented the warmth of the song. An accompanying music video, directed by Rich Lee, follows the trio wandering through the desert in search of home only to find burned belongings and the shell of a home. Singled out as one of the album's highlights, "Coming Home" was promoted with live TV performances including at the American Music Awards on November 21, 2010, the WWE Tribute to the Troops concert, and the March 10, 2011, episode of American Idol which marked the first live performance of the song featuring Skylar Grey.

"Coming Home" became Diddy – Dirty Money's most commercially successful release. Along with amassing one million digital sales, it peaked at number 11 on the Billboard Hot 100, and number nine in Canada. Internationally, the single topped both Belgium Ultratip charts and the Swiss Singles Chart, as well as reaching top five in the UK. This comes in addition to breaking onto the A-playlists on British urban music radio and mainstream radio, and topping the UK R&B Singles chart for three consecutive weeks.

== Inspiration and composition ==
"Coming Home" is a downtempo hip-hop and pop song, that opens with a "simple piano intro" and a "delicate vocal verse from Skylar Grey". It was written by Grey, Jay-Z, J. Cole, and Alex "da Kid" Grant, and produced by Jay-Z and Grant. When speaking to Kid about what he wanted, Diddy said, "I want a beat that makes me feel like a white man in a basement in Atlanta". Diddy later called "Coming Home" a gift from Jay-Z and Kid. On Genius, Grey wrote: "This is actually crazy. I wrote "Coming Home" for T.I. originally because he was getting out of prison, so it was originally written about that. But Puff wanted [the song] when he heard it and the song I had originally written for Puff, which is called "Castle Walls," ended up on T.I.'s album. So they swapped songs. The meaning of "Coming Home" changed and that's the beauty of music: it's open to interpretation." A demo of the song leaked in April 2010, performed by J. Cole and Skylar Grey. The only remnants of the demo in the final version of the song is the intro.

According to the sheet music published at Musicnotes.com, by EMI Music Publishing, the song was performed in the key of D major with a time signature of common time and a tempo of 69 beats per minute. It follows the basic chord progression of G–D–Bm–F♯m. Jayson Rodriguez of MTV noted that the concept and theme of the song were similar to events in Diddy's life, "referencing mistakes he has made in the past and that he wants to put behind him." Rodriguez also noted the song's tribute to The Notorious B.I.G., in the line "I miss you, B.I.G." The chorus features vocals from the group's female members, Kalenna Harper and Dawn Richard, as well as background vocals from fellow Bad Boy Records recording artist Cassie. The trio use a vocal range of A_{3}–A_{4}. Grey also sings some of the vocals during the song's opening chorus.

Diddy-Dirty Money – "Coming Home"
Diddy's second verse where he references the death of The Notorious B.I.G. and other moments in his life.

Rap-Up magazine reflected on the lyrics of the song, calling them a personal reflection of Diddy's life and career thanks to lines like "What am I ‘posed to do when the club lights come on/ It’s easy to be Puff, but it’s harder to be Sean/ What if my twins ask why I ain’t married their mom?" Scott Schetler from AOL Radio Blog noted how Diddy referenced a different popular song in each verse. Lamb particularly noted the strong autobiographical lyrics, and the references to the 1979 hit song "Ain't No Stoppin' Us Now" by McFadden & Whitehead. Other songs referenced include Dionne Warwick's "A House Is Not a Home" (1964) and Smokey Robinson & the Miracles' "The Tears of a Clown" (1970). Rodriguez said "Diddy do[es] some soul-searching in his rhymes as the chorus echoes his need for salvation."

Lamb compared the song to Diddy's early releases, saying that "'Coming Home' [welcomes] Diddy back to the upper ranks of pop-oriented hip hop artists". Additionally, Diddy told MTV that although the track had autobiographical elements, it was part of the album's "conceptual love story narrated by his character". When asked by Live Lounge's Trevor Nelson what "Coming Home" was based on, Diddy said:

"Coming Home" goes to everybody out there who's going through a struggle or obstacle. I've been lost in life, I'm still lost in life in these sense of trying to find your way back to that person who your grandmother or father wanted you to be. Sometimes you get lost through drug addiction or you break up with up your partner or remission from cancer etc. you struggle to find your way back to yourself. That's what "Coming Home" is about.

== Critical reception ==
Upon release, "Coming Home" was generally met with a positive reception from music critics, who praised the autobiographical lyrics and composition of Skylar Grey's vocals with the Alex da Kid and Jay-Z production. Becky Bain of Idolator wrote, "We have to give some credit to Diddy (or Jay-Z, if he did indeed write [the lyrics]) for dropping some truly introspective lyrics instead of the usual not-so-subtle Cîroc vodka promotions." Simon Vozick-Levinson from Entertainment Weekly agreed, and noted "Coming Home" as one of Last Train to Paris' highlights, saying it was a "must download" as the album's only "redemptive ballad". Jim Farber of the New York Daily News also noted the song's redemptive themes. He said 'Coming Home' is the "only song which breaks the flow" of Last Train to Paris, "Diddy confesses to everything from bad parenting to fear of commitment. It's an interesting moment but an unnecessary one."

Meanwhile, About.com's Bill Lamb awarded the song four out of five stars, calling it the first "pop hit single" in a long time "[which] matches the size of his public persona". He praised the "beautifully sung chorus by Skylar Grey" and Diddy's deep "autobiographical lyrics". Lamb noted that the song "didn't have the same intensity of emotional impact" other Alex da Kid productions (Eminem's "Love the Way You Lie") but it did "deliver a warmth and sense of hope that is a good match with the current holiday season." A reviewer from Sound Savvy said "The latest single 'Coming Home' is another example of some of the great work found on the album. ... it’s a heartfelt anthem of triumph and survival – somber but not depressing."

== Chart performance ==
"Coming Home" premiered on October 31, 2010, just prior to the fourth game of the Baseball World Series. It made its U.S. Billboard Hot 100 chart debut at number sixty-one on December 11, 2010, three weeks after its release. In its third week on the U.S. Billboard Hot 100, the single experienced a 92% increase in sales, which amounted to 65,000 copies. As a result, the song vaulted from number forty-four to number seventeen on the Digital Songs chart causing the single to move from number fifty-one to twenty-four on the Billboard Hot 100. The song peaked at number seven on the Billboard Hot Digital Songs chart, number nine on the U.S. Pop Songs, number seven on the Canadian Hot 100 chart, and number eleven on the Billboard Hot 100 chart. It also peaked at number fifteen on the Radio Songs. Consequently, "Coming Home" outperformed all of the group's previous singles on the Hot 100 and Digital Songs charts. Additionally, "Coming Home" also peaked higher than two of the three songs mentioned in the lyrics. "Ain't No Stoppin' Us Now" by McFadden & Whitehead reached number thirteen, while Dionne Warwick's "A House Is Not a Home" only reached number seventy-nine. The song experience some crossover success, including on the Rap Songs chart where it reached number twenty-one. By the end of January 2011, "Coming Home" had sold one million digital copies in the United States. It was certified platinum by the Recording Industry Association of America (RIAA) on April 19 and 2× platinum on May 17, 2011.

Internationally, the single got off to a strong start in Belgium, debuting on both the Flanders Tip and Wallonia Tip charts at number twenty-six. "Coming Home" would later top both Tip charts, before impacting on the main Ultratop charts. On the Flanders Ultratop Singles chart, the song peaked at number seventeen, while on the Wallonia chart it peaked at number twenty-seven. "Coming Home" debuted in Switzerland at number forty-eight, and dropped seven places to number fifty-five in its second week. In its third week, the single rose fifteen places to number forty, and then continued to rise, eventually reaching number one on the Swiss Singles Chart. As a result of reaching number one, "Coming Home" is Diddy's highest-charting single in Switzerland in fourteen years; his last number one in Switzerland was "I'll Be Missing You" with Faith Evans and 112 in 1997. "Coming Home" made its Australian Singles Chart debut at number forty-nine and is thus the first single from Diddy-Dirty Money to chart within the top-fifty. It is since peaked at number four, and number two on the Australian Urban Singles Chart. The single had equal success in Germany, peaking at number four for two weeks.

"Coming Home" was also successful in other territories too, also peaking in the top-ten in Austria, France, Ireland, New Zealand and Poland. On December 15, 2010, the single was added to the playlists on British mainstream radio and a week later to the playlists on British urban music radio. Following its release, "Coming Home" debuted at number four on the UK Singles Chart, becoming Diddy's most successful single in that country since 2006's "Come to Me" with Nicole Scherzinger. Additionally the single topped the UK R&B Chart and as a consequence, "Coming Home" is Diddy-Dirty Money's most successful single in the United Kingdom. In its second week, the single held on to its position of number four on the singles chart, which came in addition to maintaining its position at the top of the UK R&B Singles chart for three consecutive weeks. According to a press release by Interscope Records, as of March 25, 2011, "Coming Home" has sold 1.8 million digital downloads worldwide.

== Music video ==
=== Background ===
The accompanying music video made its worldwide premiere through E! Online on November 29, 2010. It was filmed entirely in the Mojave Desert, just outside Palm Springs, CA. The video was the first of three released in the three weeks counting down to the album's release. Album cuts "Somebody to Love Me" and "Ass on the Floor" (featuring Swizz Beatz) received video releases on December 10 and 13, respectively. "Coming Home" was directed by Rich Lee and according to Steven Gottlieb, of Video Static, the theme drew comparisons to some of Diddy's earliest work. "'Coming Home' has Diddy choppering onto a dry lake bed which is dotted by the charred remains of a luxurious lifestyle."

The official video premiered on Vevo and YouTube on November 30, 2010.

=== Synopsis ===
A scene from the middle of the video, where Diddy enters the burnt remains of a home, while singing about moments of his life. The two female members of the group (Dawn and Kalenna) walk the landscape outside.

"Coming Home" starts with scenes of a black helicopter (an AgustaWestland AW109) flying over the desert. In some of the shots, Diddy can be seen looking out on to the horizon. As the song progresses into its main verses, the camera follows Diddy walking through the desert. In the background and foreground, the fire-damaged remnants of a home such as a TV set, fur coats and a stereo system are scattered across the landscape. During the chorus Dawn Richard and Kalenna Harper take place in front of the camera, walking behind Diddy miming Grey's words. Later in the clip, during the second verse, Diddy sits in a burned out building singing to himself. Outside, a burned out vehicle is parked. Then during the song's bridge, red smoke surrounds Diddy as the helicopter, from the opening scene, comes to land. However, this time Richard and Harper are seated inside waiting for Diddy. As the song fades, the helicopter flies over the desert toward the horizon.

=== Reception ===
Staff from E! Online seemed impressed with the video's concept and choice of background scenery. They said "what better place for some introspection than the desert, right? No sexy bikini-clad ladies or blue-haired Nicki Minajs to distract you, and when you're done, just call up the helicopter to pick you up (Pro tip: Hang your leg outside of the chopper for extra cool points.)". Stephen Gottlieb from Video Static said "It's a nice bookend with Diddy's – then Puff Daddy – first solo video, "Can't Nobody Hold Me Down," which featured him and Mase introducing an era of big budget hip-hop while driving a Rolls convertible across the desert." While Ed Easton Jr. from 92.3 Now FM drew comparisons to Diddy's earlier video for his 1997 hit single "Been Around the World", thus awarding the video six out of ten. However Easton was annoyed with the number of videos being released and said that fans were waiting for the actual album to be released.

== Live performances and usage in media ==
Diddy-Dirty Money performed the song live for the first time at the 2010 American Music Awards on November 21, 2010. For the performance the group were joined on stage by a full orchestra, with Diddy dressed in all-black but the other half of the group dressed in white gowns. The group reprised this performance on the December 4, 2010, airing of Saturday Night Live along with the debut performance of the next scheduled single "Ass On the Floor". On December 14, 2010, the group performed "Coming Home" on two separate occasions. First Diddy appeared on daytime chatshow, The View, for an interview and was then joined by Richard and Harper to perform "Coming Home" then later the trio performed on the Late Show with David Letterman. Four days later, the group performed the ballad at the WWE Tribute to the Troops concert. On January 20, 2011, the group performed the song live in the United Kingdom, on the Radio 1 Live Lounge. Diddy-Dirty Money then returned to the United States, where they performed "Coming Home" for the first time with Skylar Grey, on season ten of American Idol, on March 10, 2011.

The song was used as entrance music by UFC Light Heavyweight champion Jon Bones Jones before his successful title defense against Quinton Rampage Jackson. Also, during the pre-game introductions for the New York Knicks' 2010–11 NBA game against the Milwaukee Bucks on February 23, 2011 (and home debut of newly acquired Syracuse Orange alumnus Carmelo Anthony), the song was used in a pre-game video, welcoming Melo "home" (he started his NBA career with the Denver Nuggets after leaving the Orange) to New York. There is also a friendly version of the song recorded by the cast of Nickelodeon's popular TV show iCarly, which can be heard on the show's second soundtrack, entitled iSoundtrack II. It was the official theme song to WWE's WrestleMania 29, and at the event, Sean Combs and Skylar Grey performed it live in front of a sold-out venue of 80,676 in MetLife Stadium. Though not used as the official theme song, "Coming Home" has been used in almost every advertisement for the ABC drama series Resurrection. On December 4, 2013, The Fast and the Furious team released a tribute video to Paul Walker after the actor's untimely death, which contained excerpts from Coming Home. On December 30, 2014, newly hired Michigan Wolverines head football coach Jim Harbaugh was introduced to the public during a brief halftime ceremony with the song playing as he walked onto center court.

== Track listing ==
- Digital single
1. "Coming Home" featuring Skylar Grey – 3:59
2. "Coming Home" featuring Skylar Grey (Instrumental) – 3:59
- UK CD single
1. "Coming Home" featuring Skylar Grey (Album Version) – 3:59
2. "Coming Home" featuring Skylar Grey (Clean Version) – 3:59
- Digital download
1. "Coming Home" featuring Skylar Grey – 3:59
- Germany CD Single
1. "Coming Home" featuring Skylar Grey – 4:00
2. "Hello Good Morning" featuring T.I. – 4:29

== Credits and personnel ==
"Coming Home" was recorded at Chalice Recording Studios and End of Era Studios in Los Angeles, California.

- J Browz – additional piano, guitar and bass
- Jay-Z – producer (co-producer)
- Diddy – lead vocals
- Steve "Rock Star" Dickey – engineer
- Dirty Money (Kalenna Harper, Dawn Richard) – lead vocals
- Alex "da Kid" Grant – producer
- Zack Gurka – engineer
- Skylar Grey – featured vocals
- Eric Hudson – Additional keyboards
- Sly Jordan – vocal production
- Chris Kasych – assistant engineer
- Erik Madrid – assistant mix engineer
- Manny Marroquin – mix engineer
- Jarrod Newcomb – assistant engineer
- Matthew Testa – engineer
- Cassie Ventura – additional background vocals
- Jeffrey Walker (J-Dub) – additional keyboards

== Charts ==
=== Weekly charts ===
Weekly chart performance for "Coming Home"
Chart (2010–2011)	Peak position
Australia (ARIA)	4
Australia (ARIA Urban Singles)	2
Austria (Ö3 Austria Top 40)	8
Belgium (Ultratop 50 Flanders)	17
Belgium (Ultratop 50 Wallonia)	27
Canada (Canadian Hot 100)	7
Czech Republic Airplay (ČNS IFPI)	26
France (SNEP)	8
Germany (GfK)	4
Ireland (IRMA)	3
Israel International Airplay (Media Forest)	2
Netherlands (Dutch Top 40)	16
Netherlands (Single Top 100)	14
New Zealand (Recorded Music NZ)	5
Norway (VG-lista)	13
Poland (ZPAV)	3
Scottish Singles Sales (Official Charts)	3
Slovakia Airplay (ČNS IFPI)	17
Sweden (Sverigetopplistan)	26
Switzerland (Schweizer Hitparade)	1
UK Singles (Official Charts)	4
UK Hip Hop/R&B (Official Charts)	1
US Billboard Hot 100	11
US Pop Airplay (Billboard)	9
US Hot R&B/Hip-Hop Songs (Billboard)	83

=== Year-end charts ===
Year-end chart performance for "Coming Home"
Chart (2011)	Position
Australia (ARIA)	37
Austria (Ö3 Austria Top 40)	62
Belgium (Ultratop 50 Flanders)	98
Canada (Canadian Hot 100)	31
Germany (Official German Charts)	56
Sweden (Sverigetopplistan)	85
Switzerland (Schweizer Hitparade)	23
UK Singles (OCC)	55
US Billboard Hot 100	38
US Mainstream Top 40 (Billboard)	38

== Certifications ==
Certifications and sales for "Coming Home"
Region	Certification	Certified units/sales
Australia (ARIA)	5× Platinum	350,000^{‡}
Brazil (Pro-Música Brasil)	Gold	30,000^{‡}
Denmark (IFPI Danmark)	Gold	45,000^{‡}
Germany (BVMI)	Platinum	300,000^{‡}
New Zealand (RMNZ)	Gold	7,500^{*}
Switzerland (IFPI Switzerland)	Platinum	30,000^{^}
United Kingdom (BPI)	Platinum	600,000^{‡}
United States (RIAA)	2× Platinum	2,000,000^{^}
^{*} Sales figures based on certification alone.^{^} Shipments figures based on certification alone.^{‡} Sales+streaming figures based on certification alone.

== Radio and release history ==
Release dates, formats and labels for "Coming Home"
Region	Date	Format	Record Label	Ref.
United States	November 16, 2010	Mainstream airplay	Bad Boy; Interscope	
United States	November 21, 2010	Digital download; streaming	Bad Boy; Interscope	
Belgium	December 13, 2010	Digital download; streaming	Universal Music	
Finland	December 13, 2010	Digital download; streaming	Universal Music	
France	December 13, 2010	Digital download; streaming	Universal Music	
Norway	December 13, 2010	Digital download; streaming	Universal Music	
Netherlands	December 17, 2010	Digital download; streaming	Universal Music	
Ireland	January 13, 2011	Digital single	Universal Music	
United Kingdom	January 16, 2011	Digital single	Polydor Records	
United Kingdom	January 17, 2011	CD single	Polydor Records	
Germany	January 21, 2011	CD single	Universal Music	
