= Hello Good Morning (Nick MacKenzie song) =

"Hello, Good Morning" is a 1980 hit single by the Dutch singer Nick Mackenzie (stage name of Nick van den Broeke), written by Henk Van Broekhoven. The song was also recorded by Van Broekhoven under his own stage name John Spencer in 1996. Mackenzie's original record reached No.20 in the Dutch charts, while Van Broekhoven as John Spencer's version reached No.35 in 1996. In 2010 the Flemish singer Bart Kaëll brought out the song again in Flemish translation as "Hallo goeie morgen!", which was a No.30 hit in Belgium.
