= Diddy – Dirty Money =

American R&B trio

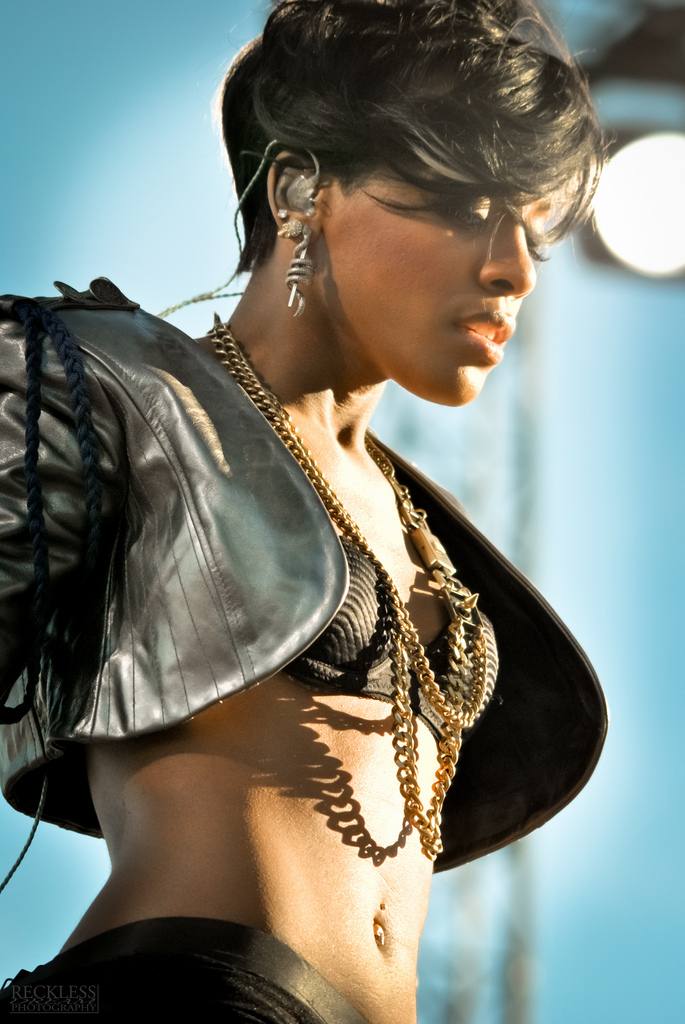
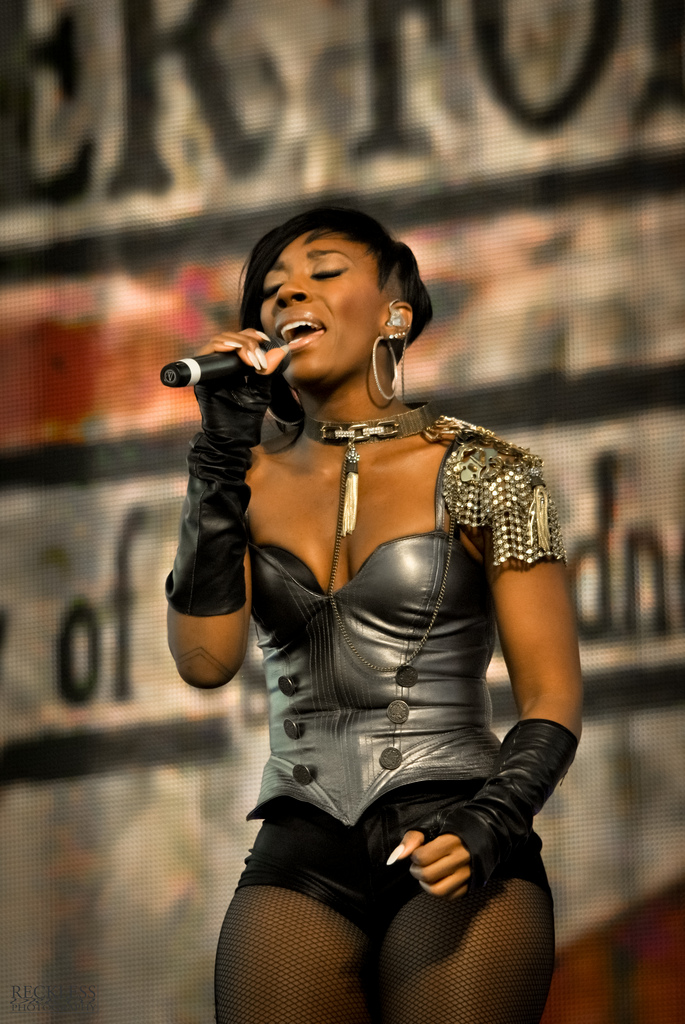
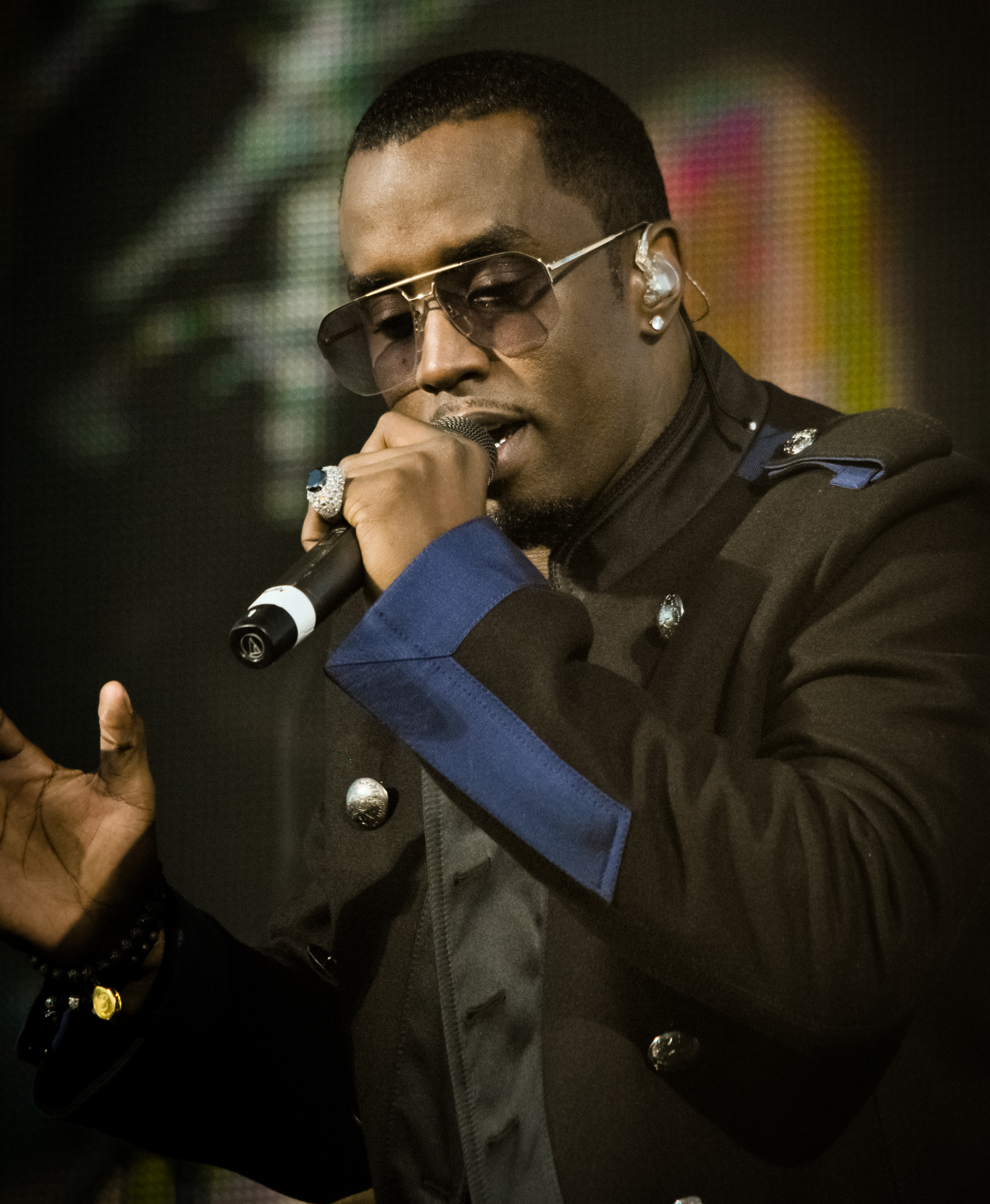
- Clockwise: Richard, Harper and Combs performing in December 2010

Background information
- Also known as: Dirty Money
- Origin: New York City, U.S.
- Genres: R&B; hip-hop
- Years active: 2009–2012, 2023
- Labels: Bad Boy; Interscope
- Past members: Diddy; Dawn Richard; Kalenna Harper
- Website: diddydirtymoney.com

Diddy – Dirty Money was an American musical trio, composed of R&B singers Dawn Richard and Kalenna Harper, and rapper Sean "Diddy" Combs. The group, formed and introduced by the latter in July 2009, refers to their billing with Combs, while the "Dirty Money" act refers solely to Richard and Harper. The group signed with Combs' Bad Boy Records, a then-imprint of Interscope Records to release five commercial singles leading up to the release of their debut collaborative album, Last Train to Paris (2010). Supported by the single "Coming Home" (featuring Skylar Grey), the album peaked at number seven on the Billboard 200 and saw positive critical reception. It was preceded by one mixtape and followed by another until their 2012 disbandment.

In September 2024, Richard filed a complaint in New York federal court against Combs, citing over a decade of sexual abuse. Shortly after, Harper allegedly received 128 missed calls from Combs. Harper has acknowledged the claims, but did not attest to several of them.

== History ==
According to Combs, Diddy – Dirty Money was "a look, a sound, a movement, [and] a crew" and not about "drug money, illegal money, or anything negative ... for my new concept album Last Train to Paris, I wanted to do something refreshing, something unique, something forward for myself as an artist ... I wanted to tell a love story [but] I couldn't just tell the male's point of view." Bad Boy A&R Daniel 'Skid' Mitchell told HitQuarters that Diddy – Dirty Money is creating a new genre of "futuristic soul".

On July 24, 2010, Diddy – Dirty Money performed at Sun Life Stadium in the Baker Concrete Super Saturday postgame concert following the Florida Marlins' 10–5 loss to the Atlanta Braves.

Diddy – Dirty Money appeared on NBC's Saturday Night Live on December 4, 2010. That same month, the trio guest performed featured on Timati's single "I'm on You". The group's first and only album, Last Train to Paris was released by Interscope Records on December 14 of that year. Allmusic called it a "heavily European-influenced effort" that "mashes together Italo disco, pop-rap, tech-house, and the sound of Bad Boy in its prime, with an all-star guest list that goes from T.I. to Grace Jones." The album peaked at number seven on the Billboard 200 and saw overall praise from music critics. Four days after its release, they performed the album's biggest single, "Coming Home", as well as Diddy's 1997 single "I'll Be Missing You", for the American Armed Forces at WWE's Tribute to the Troops in Fort Hood, Texas.

The trio performed "Coming Home" and a cover of Far East Movement's "Like a G6" at the Maida Vale Studios, for BBC Radio 1's Live Lounge on January 20, 2011. They also performed "Coming Home" live on American Idol with Skylar Grey on March 10 of that year.

In 2023, a previously unheard song by trio, "Deliver Me", featuring Busta Rhymes, was included on Diddy's fifth album, The Love Album: Off the Grid.

== Discography ==
=== Albums ===
==== Studio albums ====
Album	Peak chart positions				
Album	U.S.	U.S. R&B	CAN	UK	FRA
Last Train to Paris: Released: December 13, 2010; Label: Bad Boy, Interscope; Formats: CD, digital download, LP	7	3	67	24	194
"—" denotes releases that did not chart or receive certification.

==== Mixtapes ====
Title	Album details
Last Train to Paris: Prelude	Released: December 2, 2010; Label: Bad Boy Records
Love Love vs. Hate Love	Released: February 14, 2011; Label: Bad Boy Records

=== Singles ===
==== As lead artist ====
Year	Title	Peak chart positions										Certifications	Album
Year	Title	US	US R&B	US Rap	US Pop	AUS	CAN	IRL	SWI	FRA	UK	Certifications	Album
2009	"Angels" (with Diddy featuring The Notorious B.I.G.)	116	71	—	—	—	—	—	—	—	—		Last Train to Paris
2010	"Hello Good Morning" (featuring T.I.)	27	13	8	38	94	55	41	65	—	22	US: Gold	Last Train to Paris
2010	"Loving You No More" (featuring Drake)	91	20	17	—	—	—	—	—	—	—		Last Train to Paris
2010	"Coming Home" (featuring Skylar Grey)	11	83	21	9	4	7	3	1	8	4	US: 2× Platinum; AUS: 5× Platinum; UK: Gold	Last Train to Paris
2011	"Your Love" (featuring Trey Songz)	—	23	20	—	—	—	—	—	—	—		Last Train to Paris
2011	"Ass on the Floor" (featuring Swizz Beatz)	—	80	—	—	—	—	—	—	—	187		Last Train to Paris
"—" denotes releases that did not chart or receive certification.

==== As a featured artist ====
Year	Title	Peak chart positions										Certifications	Album
Year	Title	US	US R&B	US Rap	US Pop	AUS	CAN	IRL	SWI	FRA	UK	Certifications	Album
2010	"k.I.s.s" (Nelly featuring Dirty Money & Murphy Lee)	—	—	—	—	—	—	—	—	—	—		5.0
2010	"I'm On You" (Timati featuring P. Diddy & Dirty Money)	—	—	—	—	—	—	—	67	—	—		SWAGG

==== Promotional singles ====
Year	Song	Peak chart positions
Year	Song	US R&B
2009	"Love Come Down"	62
"—" denotes releases that did not chart or receive certification.

==== Other charted songs ====
Year	Song	Peak chart positions	Album
Year	Song	US R&B	Album
2011	"Someone to Love Me"	82	Last Train to Paris
2011	"Looking for Love" (featuring Usher)	91	Last Train to Paris
"—" denotes releases that did not chart or receive certification.

== Tours ==
- Coming Home (2011)

== Awards and nominations ==
- MUZ-TV Music Awards
  - Best Video = "I'm on You" featuring Timati – 2011 – Won
- BET Awards 2011
  - Best Group – Won
