= Last Train to Paris =

Studio album by Diddy – Dirty Money
- Released: December 14, 2010
- Recorded: 2008–2010
- Studios: 2nd Floor Studios (Hollywood); Boom Boom Room (Burbank); Chalice Studios (Los Angeles); End of Era (Los Angeles); No Excuses (Los Angeles); Daddy's House (New York); Record Plant (New York)
- Genres: Hip hop; house
- Length: 64:55 (standard); 73:07 (deluxe)
- Labels: Bad Boy; Interscope
- Producers: 7 Aurelius; Alex da Kid; Arden "Keyzbaby" Altino; Swizz Beatz; D'Mile; Danja; Deekay; Jerry Duplessis; Sean Garrett; Guy Gerber; Hollywood Hot Sauce; Jay-Z; Rodney "Darkchild" Jerkins; James "JLack" Lackey; Polow da Don; Harve Pierre; Miykal Snoddy; Team S. Dot; The-Dream; Tricky Stewart; Mario Winans

Diddy chronology
Press Play (2006)	Last Train to Paris (2010)	MMM (Money Making Mitch) (2015)

Dirty Money chronology
Last Train To Paris (2010)	Love Love vs. Hate Love (2011)

Singles from Last Train to Paris
- 1. "Angels" Released: November 3, 2009; 2. "Hello Good Morning" Released: March 30, 2010; 3. "Loving You No More" Released: September 21, 2010; 4. "Coming Home" Released: November 16, 2010; 5. "Your Love" Released: March 15, 2011; 6. "Ass on the Floor" Released: April 17, 2011

Last Train to Paris is the only studio album by American R&B trio Diddy – Dirty Money, composed of rapper Sean "Diddy" Combs, and R&B singers Kalenna Harper and Dawn Richard. It was released on December 14, 2010, by Bad Boy Records and Interscope Records. Story-wise, the album follows Diddy's alter-ego as he travels from London to Paris to regain his lost love. Subject matter and lyrics are based around dramatized descriptions of romance, heartache, vulnerability, regret, and emotional conflict. Predominantly styled in contemporary R&B, Last Train to Paris incorporates elements of Eurodance, Italo disco and tech house.

It is the only album by Dirty Money before their 2012 disbandment, although the group reunited once more to perform on a song from Diddy's fifth album, The Love Album: Off the Grid (2023). Guest vocalists on the album include Grace Jones, Chris Brown, Lil Wayne, Skylar Grey, Drake, Justin Timberlake, Nicki Minaj, T.I., Wiz Khalifa, Swizz Beatz, Trey Songz, Rick Ross, Usher, Sevyn Streeter, James Fauntleroy, Bilal and the Notorious B.I.G. The album also features vocal segues from fashion designers and editors, including Vogue editor-in-chief Anna Wintour and Tommy Hilfiger. The executive producers on the album are Rodney Jerkins, Diddy, Mario Winans and Harve Pierre.

The album marks Diddy's only project with Interscope Records after he and his Bad Boy label parted ways with Atlantic Records in 2009. Last Train to Paris was generally praised by critics, who commended the addition of Richard and Harper to help Diddy innovate a new sound. Its three preceding singles, "Angels", "Hello Good Morning" and "Loving You No More", were met with moderate success on the Billboard Hot 100. Its fourth, "Coming Home", was released in November 2010, peaked at number 11 on the chart, and foresaw the album's release the following month.

The album spawned two further singles released the next year, "Your Love" and "Ass on the Floor", both of which failed to chart. During its opening week, Last Train to Paris outperformed expectations, debuting eight places higher than predicted—at number seven—on the US Billboard 200. It sold 101,000 copies, compared to the 60,000-70,000 copies that Billboard had predicted it would sell. However, despite this strong debut week, the album underperformed sales-wise.

== Conception ==
Diddy described Last Train to Paris as an "electro-hip-hop-soul funk" album which has been three years in the making. Diddy says the sound of this album was influenced by "being in the dance music world and doing stuff with Felix da Housecat, Erick Morillo, Deep Dish, DJ Hell and being in Ibiza and DC10." The arc follows Diddy's character as he tours from London to Paris and finds the woman of his dreams - only to lose her, find her, lose her again and find her a final time.

The records were conceptualised from Diddy's comments to his producers. He told Alex da Kid, who produced "Coming Home", "I want a beat that makes me feel like a white man in a basement in Atlanta." Diddy said that "most of the producers he worked with, he's been friends with for a long time. The records came together by hanging out with them, taking them to parties and showing them movies".

In an interview with MTV News, Diddy said "One of the things [Dirty Money] trying to represent is emotion... Not being afraid to show emotion on record. A lot of records out right now — no disrespect to them, but they're all surface. Its about what people have or a dance. All our records are gonna be about love, feelings and emotion. Last Train to Paris is a love story and the most vulnerable album I've ever been involved in. Its raw emotion — you get a feeling, a vibe."

Diddy released an application for the iPhone that integrates his social networking site and Twitter feed. A short film will also accompany the album. Rap producer Bangladesh, confirmed that he would be producing for the album. According to New York Magazine, the album was "assembled from 60 or so songs. The genesis of Last Train to Paris is full of odd stories involving our hero, ensconced in a darkened studio, barking batty ideas to his production team."

== Dirty Money ==
Last Train to Paris is officially credited to Diddy – Dirty Money. Dirty Money was formed when Diddy asked former Danity Kane member Dawn Richard, and singer-songwriter Kalenna Harper to perform alongside him on the album. In an interview with AllHipHop, Diddy said that Dirty Money is "not about no drug money, illegal money, or anything negative". Instead he described it as "a sound, a movement, [and] a crew", something fresh and unique for his new album. He explained that "he wanted to tell a love story" but needed Dirty Money because "he couldn’t just tell the male’s point of view."

Elaborating on the group's name, Diddy told Slant Magazine that its origins are dated back to 2005 when the group was at "a strip club in Jacksonville, Florida, during the Super Bowl. People heard I was there, and all of a sudden so many people came in that I had to rush outside to my truck. I was sitting there with a bunch of money and I was like, 'Damn, this is some dirty money.' A light bulb went off that day." Simon Vozick-Levinson from Entertainment Weekly described the group's role on the album as "fleshing out Last Train's skeletal storyline, playing jealous lovers, disappointed partners, and commanding divas to his conflicted playboy."

Jim Farber of New York Daily News said that Dirty Money "sing loudly, often and well -- a good thing", on the disk. Henry Yanney of Soulculture said that Last Train to Paris was vocally-led Harper and Richard, who give the album "attitude and style". He said "the duo sing harmoniously and break into solos with much precision and pace, remaining in sync at all times with the abrasive club influenced beats on hand." David Jeffries said that at times Dirty Money came off as "fine background singers or part of Diddy’s Fashion Week posse."

Matt Sayles disagreed, stating that on the record, "Diddy takes a backseat" which allowed "Kaleena and Dawn to do a lot of the heavy lifting (and breathing) on a wide range of songs." Dirty Money was inspired by the 1980s bands Soul II Soul and Loose Ends though Diddy pointed out that he "wanted to flip things" by having two girls and one guy in the band. "Two bad divas, one for the left and one for the right side of me". He told Amos Barshad from New York Magazine that "[The girls in Dirty Money] diamonds in the rough. These girls got a certain flavor and swagger, which is rare in this marketplace."

== Album cover ==
The album cover is a photograph at the Centre Georges Pompidou in Paris, taken by Australian cricket writer and photographer Jarrod "Jrod" Kimber.

== Guest vocals ==
Guests included on the album were initially confirmed as Justin Timberlake, Chris Brown, Drake, Lil Wayne, Rick Ross, T.I., Swizz Beatz, Grace Jones, Bilal and Wiz Khalifa but the final track list also included Skylar Grey. Richard told MTV News that the album had been in the making before she and Harper joined Diddy to form Dirty Money. She said "I know when Kalenna and I speak, we sometimes feel giddy because people like pioneers of the game said, 'You know what? We want to be on your album,'". Richard also defended the number of guests on the album stating that it was a "labor of love" which is why the group felt like the album needed a "stunning introduction" to the world.

Simon Vozick-Levinson of Entertainment Weekly said the role of the guests on the album "[mainly] assorted suave fellows... help fill out [Diddy]'s side of the conversation." Vogue was first to reveal that editors and fashion designers have recorded vocal segues for the album. Among those set to feature on the album are Isaac Mizrahi, André Leon Talley, Zac Posen, Marc Jacobs, Anna Wintour (editor in chief at Vogue) and Tommy Hilfiger. Talley said of his involved in the album, "[Diddy]'s like great creative thinkers in music who love fashion; swooner Marvin Gaye in his duets with Tammi Terrell comes to mind — what sense of elegance, what Motown glamour!"

== Promotion ==
On November 21, 2010, Diddy-Dirty Money appeared at the American Music Awards (2010) where they performed "Coming Home". On December 5, 2010, Diddy released The Prelude - Last Train to Paris, a free mixtape of seven songs from the upcoming album exclusively through Vogue. Later that same day, the group appeared on Saturday Night Live to promote the Last Train to Paris. They performed "Coming Home" and "Ass on the Floor" with Swizz Beatz. A preluding mixtape, was released exclusively to Vogue magazine on December 3, 2010. On December 13, 2010, the album was made available to stream online through Myspace.

On December 18, 2010, the group performed at the third annual WWE Tribute to the Troops concert. On the chart dated December 25, 2010, "Someone to Love Me" debuted on the U.S. Bubbling Under R&B/Hip-Hop Singles chart at number fifteen. On January 4, 2010, Angie Martinez premiered a new remix of "Someone to Love Me" on her official website. Titled "The MJB Naked Mix", the new version features Blige and Lil Wayne. Lil Wayne's verse consists of sixteen bars, and a reference to 1994 Mary J. Blige song "My Life". Additionally, the group released another mixtape in time for Valentine's Day 2011. LoveLove Vs. HateLove features at least four songs from the Last Train to Paris recording sessions plus other songs.

=== Coming Home tour ===
Rap-Up initially reported that Diddy-Dirty Money would be touring in support of the album. The Last Train to Paris world tour kicked off in March 2011. However, when the tour dates were revealed, the tour was actually renamed to The Coming Home Tour. The show kicked off on April 13, 2011, in Minneapolis, running for twenty-one dates before ending in St. Louis on May 15, 2011. Lloyd and Tyga served as the tour's opening acts.

== Singles ==
"Angels", featuring The Notorious B.I.G. and Rick Ross, was released as the first single, followed by promo single "Love Come Down" (which does not appear on the final track listing); both were released on November 3, 2009. Both tracks, which sample songs by Jay-Z, were not considered successful. The album's second single, "Hello Good Morning" features T.I., was released on March 30, 2010, and spawned several official remixes including versions featuring Rick Ross & Nicki Minaj, Tinchy Stryder & Tinie Tempah (UK Remix), Rick Ross & T.I. and a Grime mix with Skepta. The single peaked at number thirteen on the US Hot R&B/Hip-Hop Songs chart, number twenty-seven on the US Billboard Hot 100 and number fifty in Canada.

"Loving You No More", featuring Drake, was released as the album's third single on September 21, 2010. It was not as successful as its predecessor, only managing to peak at thirty-five on Hot R&B/Hip Hop Songs chart and number ninety-one on the Hot 100. Soon after, the Alex da Kid and Jay-Z produced "Coming Home" was announced as the lead single and overall fourth single, released on November 16, 2010. It features additional vocals from Kid's protégé Skylar Grey. It was the album's most successful single, peaking at number eleven on the Billboard Hot 100.

According to an official press release from Bad Boy Records, the Usher-assisted "Looking for Love" will be the next single. Despite this confirmation, "Your Love" featuring Trey Songz (with Rick Ross including a verse in the remix) was sent to Rhythmic radio on March 15, 2011, confirming it as the fifth single from the album. It has charted at No. 41 on the U.S. Billboard R&B chart. The album's sixth single is "Ass on the Floor", featuring Swizz Beatz, released to the United Kingdom. It debuted on the Bubbling Under Hot R&B/Hip-Hop Songs at number five, before making its full Hot R&B/Hip-Hop Songs chart debut at number eighty-eight the following week.

=== Other songs ===
Promo single "Love Come Down" received a music video, premiering on November 12, 2009. The vintage club TV style video sees "Diddy and the group set the tone with an all-black motif, dressing in black and performing on a black stage — except for the occasional flash of Diddy's gold teeth. Toward the end, the trio change to all-white outfits before going back to black." A separate music video was filmed for a remix for "Angels", featuring Rick Ross instead of The Notorious B.I.G., premiered on March 2, 2010, with Parris serving as the director. The video also features cameos by Busta Rhymes and DJ Khaled. Hype Williams also directed the music videos for the album's third single "Hello Good Morning", featuring T.I., which premiered in May 2010. Two alternate videos were filmed for the song's remixes; one featuring the remix that includes Rick Ross, and another for the remix that retains Rick Ross, excludes T.I. and includes Nicki Minaj.

Additionally, on November 29, 2010 "Ass on the Floor", featuring Swizz Beatz (which was released as the album's sixth single months later) was released as a free download through Beatz' Monster Mondays initiative and the video for the song was released on December 13, 2010. The video was directed by Colin Tilley. This was followed by a video for "Someone to Love Me" on December 10, 2010, which was actually shot over one year earlier, on September 29, 2009, by Nabil. A video for the remix was booked on February 9, 2011, with Colin Tilley, meanwhile a simple video for "I Hate That You Love Me" premiered on February 6, 2011. On January 21, 2011, Diddy-Dirty Money filmed a music video for "Yesterday" with Chris Brown. Tilley has also directed the video for an amended version "Your Love" which features Trey Songz and Rick Ross, which was released on March 30, 2011.

== Commercial performance ==
In its opening week, the Last Train to Paris debuted on the US Billboard 200 at number 7, with 101,000 copies sold. The final figure sold was, in Billboard's own words, "rather larger than initial forecasts", which put the album at around number 15, with 60,000 - 70,000 copies. Despite beating the expectations, the Last Train to Paris underperformed against Diddy's previous album, Press Play (2006), which debuted at number one, with 170,000 copies sold. Thus far, it is Diddy's second-lowest debut on the chart, as well as Dawn Richard's lowest charting Billboard 200 album, the others being with the group Danity Kane.

The album debuted on the US Top Digital Albums at number 7 and the US R&B/Hip-Hop Albums at number 3. It is both Diddy's and Richard's lowest charting R&B/Hip-Hop album, thus far. Last Train to Paris is Kalenna Harper's first appearance on any Billboard album chart. As of May 2011, the album has sold around 270,000 copies in the United States.

== Critical reception ==
Professional ratings
Review scores
Source	Rating
AllMusic	4/5 stars
Entertainment Weekly	B+
The Guardian	3/5 stars
The Independent	4/5 stars
NME	8/10
USA Today	3.5/4 stars
Tom Hull – on the Web	B−
Pitchfork	7.6/10

Upon its release, Last Train to Paris received positive reviews from most music critics. At Metacritic, which assigns a normalized rating out of 100 to reviews from mainstream critics, the album received an average score of 75, based on 13 reviews, which indicates "generally favorable reviews". Simon Vozick-Levinson from Entertainment Weekly said "Last Train to Paris's glittery grooves feel authentically his own." He called Last Train a throwback to Diddy's 2007 hit single "Last Night". Its the "electro-laced torch duet blown out to full album length". He concluded by saying "the sheer number of cameos overwhelms the narrative conceit after a while... But who really cares? By that time, you just might be enjoying yourself way too much to notice."

Jim Farber of New York Daily News was impressed with Dirty Money's contribution to the album. He said "their input gives the CD a cohesion otherwise disrupted by Diddy's usual conga line of guest stars." He pointed out that the album takes on a Eurodance sound and although people might see it as "leaping on that bandwagon but as it turns out, the milieu proves a much better fit for his, er, talents, than any CD he has released so far." Farber concluded by saying "The Euro edge gives the music a leg up on the more conservative (read: American) dance music favored by the most mainstream club act of now -- those ever mushy Peas."

Andy Gill of The Independent noted Dirty Money's "emphasis on emotion over purely dance imperatives" and dubbed the album "easily the best work Diddy's been involved with in his entire career." Caroline Sullivan of The Guardian gave it three out of five stars and stated, "The album is a mess, but a hook-heavy, likable one."

David Jeffries from AllMusic noted Diddy's "unfiltered self" and "unique attitude", stating "This hook-filled, vibrant effort is that rare heartbreak album that can speak on a lovelorn level and then put a little strut back in your step." Matt Sayles from The Boston Globe complimented its concept and praised the mixture of R&B vocals from Dirty Money and the guest features from the range of A-list friends, particularly Grace Jones stating that "There’s no telling why she turns up but she sounds right at home on the thumping club anthem. [Grace's] cameo is just one more pleasant surprise on an album full of them."

Brandon Soderberg from The Village Voice was also impressed with the artistic creation. He said "Once you hear Paris's mish-mash (Diddy’s word) of sounds, all that producer-genius experimentalism makes some sense. Every song is full of swift change-ups and jarring musical detours; Diddy often interrupts these jagged dance tracks to emote... Its lots of fun, and though confessional in parts, its overall far from the self-serious, petulant complaint-raps of say, Drake or Kanye. Paris looks back to dance music as soulful catharsis and emotionalism, not the cold thump that’s taken over as of late."

Nitsuh Abebe from New York Magazine said "Last Train to Paris is one of the first records that's really made me feel like [Diddy] sounds clever. [However he] makes what seems to me to be an aesthetic error, which is that if you want to put sleek, rainy-sounding synths everywhere ... [But] this album hits its mood right, though — gray skies, Eurorail, and drama — its excellent stuff. The hectic format fades away, and the music actually becomes the hypnotic cruise it aspires to be."

In 2023, Diddy said the reception of the album put him in a funk, and music wasn't resonating with him like it used to: "When Last Train to Paris came out, it kind of broke my heart because people didn’t understand it right away. It was a bit before its time, and I know I was in my ego." Ultimately he said: "As time went on, people were able to connect with the album, and its become a cult classic. But for a couple of years after that, I didn’t know what to do. I wasn’t hearing the sounds."

== Track listing ==
Standard edition
No.	Title	Writer(s)	Producer(s)	Length
1.	"Intro"	Guy Gerber	Gerber	1:33
2.	"Yeah Yeah You Would" (featuring Grace Jones)	Sean Combs; Leroy Watson; Dawn Richard; Kalenna Vick; Nathaniel "Danja" Hills; Marcella Araica	Danja	3:42
3.	"I Hate That You Love Me"	Combs; Watson; Rodney "Darkchild" Jerkins; Lashawn "Big Shiz" Daniels; Latoya Duggan; Victoria McCants	Jerkins; Daniels^{[a]}	3:35
4.	"Ass on the Floor" (featuring Swizz Beatz)	Combs; Richard; Watson; Vick; Kasseem "Swizz Beatz" Dean	Swizz Beatz	4:04
5.	"Looking for Love" (featuring Usher)	Michael "Lo" Jones; William "Rick Ross" Roberts II; James "JLack" Lackey; Usher Raymond IV	Lackey; Polow da Don^{[b]}	4:18
6.	"Someone to Love Me"	Combs; Jerry "Wonda" Duplessis; Bettye Crutcher; David Porter; Ronnie Williams; Watson	Duplessis; Arden "Keyz" Altino^{[b]}	3:07
7.	"Hate You Now"	Combs; Richard; Vick; Hills; Araica; James Fauntleroy	Danja	4:09
8.	"Yesterday" (featuring Chris Brown)	Mario Winans; Chris Brown; Kevin McCall; Crystal Johnson; Aubrey Graham; Mario Winans	Winans	4:31
9.	"Shades" (featuring Justin Timberlake, Bilal, Lil Wayne, and James Fauntleroy)	Combs; Fautleroy; Dernst Emile II; Dwayne Carter, Jr.; Justin Timberlake	D'Mile	5:56
10.	"Angels" (featuring The Notorious B.I.G. and Rick Ross)	Combs; Winans; Fauntleroy; Christopher Wallace; Nashiem Myrick; Carlos Broady; Darryl McDaniels; Deric Angelettie; Ron Lawrence; Shawn Carter; Norman Whitfield	Sean "P Diddy" Combs"; Winans	5:11
11.	"Your Love" (featuring Trey Songz)	Indira Boodram; Kesia Hollins; Jazmyn Michel; Jamal Jones; Alja Jackson; Roberts II	Polow da Don; V. Bozeman^{[a]}	3:53
12.	"Strobe Lights" (featuring Lil Wayne)	Seven Aurelius; Tim McEwan; Richard; Vick; Carter, Jr.	7 Aurelius; Deekay^{[b]}	3:33
13.	"Hello Good Morning" (featuring T.I.)	Butler; Hills; Araica; Clifford Harris, Jr.	Danja	4:27
14.	"I Know" (featuring Chris Brown, Wiz Khalifa, and Seven of Richgirl)	Paul Dawson; Christopher Donnie Wallace; Cameron Thomaz; Brown; Jones; Full Circle (Boodram, Hollins, Michel)	Awesome Jones; Hollywood HotSauce	4:31
15.	"Coming Home" (featuring Skylar Grey)	Alexander Grant; Holly Hafermann; Carter; Jermaine Cole	Alex da Kid; Jay-Z^{[b]}; Sly Jordan^{[a]}	3:59
16.	"Loving You No More" (featuring Drake)	Sean Garrett; Miykal Snoddy; Winans; Richard; Graham	Garrett; Team S. Dot; Snoddy	4:05
Total length:				64:55

Deluxe edition
No.	Title	Writer(s)	Producer(s)	Length
1.	"Intro"	Gerber	Gerber	1:33
2.	"Ass on the Floor" (featuring Swizz Beatz)	Combs; Richard; Watson; Vick; Dean	Swizz Beatz	4:04
3.	"Yeah Yeah You Would" (featuring Grace Jones)	Combs; Richard; Watson; Vick; Hills	Danja	3:42
4.	"I Hate That You Love Me"	Combs; Watson; Jerkins; Daniels; Duggan; McCants	Jerkins; Daniels^{[a]}	3:35
5.	"Someone to Love Me"	Duplessis; Watson	Duplessis; Altino^{[b]}	3:08
6.	"Hate You Now"	Combs; Richard; Vick; Hills	Danja	4:09
7.	"Your Love" (featuring Trey Songz)	Boodram; Hollins; Michel; Jones; Jackson; Roberts II	Polow da Don; V. Bozeman^{[a]}	3:53
8.	"Shades" (featuring Justin Timberlake, Bilal, Lil Wayne, and James Fauntleroy)	Combs; Fauntleroy; Emile II; Carter, Jr; Timberlake	D'Mile	5:56
9.	"Angels" (featuring The Notorious B.I.G. and Rick Ross)	Combs; Winans; Fauntleroy; Wallace; Myrick; Broady; McDaniels; Angelettie; Lawrence; S. Carter; Whitfield	Diddy; Winans	5:11
10.	"Strobe Lights" (featuring Lil Wayne)	Aurelius; McEwan; Richard; Vick; Carter, Jr.	7 Aurelius; DEEKAY^{[b]}	3:33
11.	"Looking for Love" (featuring Usher)	Usher Raymond; M. Jones; Lackey; Roberts II	Lackey; Polow da Don^{[b]}	4:18
12.	"I Know" (featuring Chris Brown, Wiz Khalifa, and Sevyn of Richgirl)	Hollywood Hotsauce; Christopher Donnie Wallace; Cameron Thomaz; Brown; Full Circle (Boodram, Brown, Hollins)	Awesome Jones; Hollywood Hot Sauce	4:31
13.	"Loving You No More" (featuring Drake)	Garrett; Snoddy; Winans; Richard; Graham	Garrett; Team S. Dot; Snoddy	4:05
14.	"Hello Good Morning" (featuring T.I.)	Love; Hills; Aracia; Harris, Jr.	Danja	4:27
15.	"Last Night (Part 2)"	Combs; Winans; Fauntleroy; Love	Winans	3:52
16.	"Yesterday" (featuring Chris Brown)	Winans; Brown; McCall; Johnson; Graham	Winans	4:31
17.	"Change"	Terius "The-Dream" Nash; Christopher "Tricky" Stewart	The-Dream; Tricky Stewart; Kuk Harrell^{[a]}	4:43
18.	"Coming Home" (featuring Skylar Grey)	Grant; Grey; S. Carter; Cole	Alex da Kid; Jay-Z^{[b]}; Sly Jordan^{[a]}	3:59
Total length:				73:07

=== Notes ===
- ^{^[a]} denotes vocal producer.
- ^{^[b]} denotes co-producer
- "Someone to Love Me" contains a sample of "You Roam When You Don't Get It At Home" performed by The Sweet Inspirations, written by Bettye Crutcher, David Porter and Ronnie Williams.
- "Angels" contains elements of "My Downfall" written by Sean Combs, Christopher Wallace, Darryl McDaniels, Nashiem Myrick and Carlos Broady, and elements and samples of "Where I'm From" written by Deric Angelletie, Ronald Lawrence, Shawn Carter and Norman Whitfield, and performed by Jay-Z.

=== Versions ===
- On Japanese edition, it features the same track listing as the deluxe edition, that was released in other markets, but in a different order.
- Both "Clean" and "Explicit" versions of the album were released. On "Clean Versions" track two is called "A** on the Floor".
- On the deluxe edition of the album, it features "Last Night (Part 2)" as track 15, and "Change" as track 17. Tracks 14 and 15 from the standard edition, respectively appeared as tracks 12 and 18 on the deluxe edition.
- On the iTunes Store digital deluxe edition, it has an additional bonus track, "First Place Loser".

== Personnel ==
Adapted from Allmusic.

Main vocals

- Sean "Diddy" Combs
- Dirty Money – Kalenna Harper, Dawn Richard

Guest Vocals

- Swizz Beatz
- The Notorious B.I.G.
- Lil Wayne
- Chris Brown
- Drake
- T.I.
- Sevyn (formerly of Richgirl)
- James Fauntleroy
- Skylar Grey
- Grace Jones
- Wiz Khalifa
- Bilal
- Rick Ross
- Trey Songz
- Justin Timberlake
- Usher

Technicians and musicians

- The Monsters & The Strangerz – audio engineer
- Brian "Fluff" Allison – mixing assistant
- Arden "Keyz" Altino – producer
- Marcella "Ms. Lago" Araica – engineer
- Justin Batad – mixing assistant
- Smith Carlson – assistant engineer
- Matt Champlain – assistant engineer
- Capricorn Clark – creative director
- Sean Combs – producer
- LaShawn Daniels – background vocals
- Danja – instrumentation, producer (tracks 2, 7, 13)
- Tony Dawsey – mastering
- Deekay – producer
- Ben Defusco – guitar
- Dernst "D.Mile" Emile – guitar, keyboards, producer (track 9)
- Dirty Money – vocals
- Mike "Handz" Donaldson – engineer
- Jerry "Wonda" Duplessis – composer, producer (track 6)
- James Fauntleroy – background vocals
- Paul Foley – engineer
- Brian "Big Bass" Gardener – mastering
- Guy Gerber – instrumentation, producer (track 1)
- Jesus Granica – mixing assistant
- Zach Gurka – engineer
- DJ Leon Higgins – cut
- Nathaniel Hills – composer
- William Smith – composer, producer (track 1, 4, 5)
- Jai Manselle – creative consultant
- Merrell Hollis – make-up
- Hollywood Hotsauce – producer (track 14)
- Stephanie Hsu – art direction
- Eric Hudson – keyboards
- Justin Hylton-Williams – composer, vocals
- James 'J Lack' Lackey – producer (track 5)
- Jay-Z – producer (track 15)
- Jaycen Joshua – mixing
- Rodney Jerkins – associate executive producer, musician, producer (track 3)
- David "J-Maul" Johnson – keyboards
- Stefan Johnson – engineer
- Tyrone Johnson – keyboard arrangements
- Jamal "Polow Da Don" Jones – producer
- Sly Jordan – vocal producer
- Nicholson Joseph Jr. – assistant engineer
- Chris Kasych – assistant engineer, mixing assistant
- Alex da Kid – producer (track 15)
- LaShawn "The Big Shiz" Daniels – vocal producer
- Latoya Duggan – background vocals
- Giancarlo Lino – mixing assistant
- Rico Love – vocals
- Erik Madrid – mixing assistant
- Henri-David "HD" Magloire – mixing assistant
- Fabian Marasciullo – mixing
- Manny Marroquin – mixing
- Mylah Morales – make-up
- Jared Newcomb – assistant engineer
- Chris "Tek" O'Ryan – engineer
- Derek Roche – stylist
- Lucia Rodriguez – make-up
- Justin Sampson – assistant engineer, mixing assistant
- Edward Sanders – assistant engineer
- Marni Senofonte – stylist
- 7 Aurelius – producer (track 12)
- Travis Shinn – photography
- Larry Sims – hair stylist
- Curtis Smith – hair stylist
- Brian Springer – engineer
- Steve 'Rock Star' Dickey – engineer, mixing
- Jeremy Stevenson – engineer, mixing
- Steve Styles – bass
- Swizz Beatz – producer
- Dalya Taman – art direction
- Matt Testa – A&R
- Matthew Testa – engineer, mixing
- Sergio "Sergical" Tsai – engineer, mixing
- Kyle Cabrol – digital marketing intern
- Andrew Van Meter – producer
- Cassie Ventura – background vocals
- Pat Viala – engineer
- Billy Villane – mixing assistant
- Jeffrey "J-Dub" Walker – keyboards
- Miles Walker – mixing
- Nolan Wescott – mixing assistant
- Kevin Wilson – engineer, mixing assistant
- Mario Winans – executive producer, keyboards, producer (track 16)

== Charts ==
=== Weekly charts ===
Chart (2010–2011)	Peak position
French Albums (SNEP)	194
German Albums (Offizielle Top 100)	52
Irish Albums (IRMA)	41
Scottish Albums (Official Charts)	31
Swiss Albums (Schweizer Hitparade)	84
UK Albums (Official Charts)	24
UK R&B Albums (Official Charts)	5
US Billboard 200	7
US Top R&B/Hip-Hop Albums (Billboard)	3

=== Year-end charts ===
Chart (2011)	Position
US Billboard 200	118
US Top R&B/Hip-Hop Albums (Billboard)	32

== Release history ==
Region	Date	Version (Format)	Label	Catalog
United States	December 14, 2010	Standard (CD/digital download), Deluxe (CD + DVD/digital download)	Bad Boy Records	001438102
Canada	December 14, 2010	Standard (CD/digital download), Deluxe (CD + DVD/digital download)	Universal Music	001438102
Germany	December 17, 2010	Standard (CD/digital download)	Universal Music	
Australia	December 17, 2010	Standard (CD/digital download)	Universal Music	
France	December 20, 2010	Standard and deluxe (CD/digital download)	Universal Music	
Japan	January 19, 2011	Japan edition (CD/digital download)	Universal Music	UICS1212
United Kingdom	January 24, 2011	Standard (CD/digital download)	Polydor Records	2740307
Brazil	February 8, 2011	Standard (CD/digital download)	Universal Music	
Spain	June 11, 2011	Standard and deluxe (CD/digital download)	Interscope Records	DNA521A84
Indonesia	June 11, 2011	Standard and deluxe (CD/digital download)	Universal Music	
