= Loving You No More =

2010 single by Diddy – Dirty Money featuring Drake

Single by Diddy – Dirty Money featuring Drake

from the album Last Train to Paris
- Released: September 21, 2010
- Recorded: 2009–10
- Studio: Circle House Recording Studios (Miami, Florida); Daddy's House Studios in (New York City, New York)
- Genre: R&B
- Length: 4:06
- Label: Bad Boy; Interscope
- Songwriters: Sean Garrett; Aubrey Graham; Dawn Richard; Miykal Snoddy; Mario Winans
- Producers: Sean Garrett; Team S. Dot; Miykal Snoddy

Diddy – Dirty Money singles chronology
"Hello Good Morning" (2010)	"Loving You No More" (2010)	"Coming Home" (2010)

Drake singles chronology
"Aston Martin Music" (2010)	"Loving You No More" (2010)	"What Up" (2010)

"Loving You No More" is a song by American R&B trio Diddy – Dirty Money, composed of rapper Sean "Diddy" Combs, and singers Kalenna Harper and Dawn Richard, from their debut album, Last Train to Paris. It was written by Dawn Richard of the group, as well as Mario Winans and Canadian rapper Drake, the latter of whom featured on the song. Sean Garrett and his production group, Team S. Dot, receive writing and production credits, as does Miykal Snoddy. The song was released as the album's second single in the United States on September 21, 2010.

According to Combs, the song is about loving someone so much that you forget about yourself. It is a R&B tune, which integrates usage of electronica and hip-hop influences, while having a melodic, piano-laden background. The song's official remix features American rappers Gucci Mane and Red Cafe, while rapper and producer Jermaine Dupri also recorded a remix to the song. While critics were divided over Combs' part in the track, most complimented the song's production, Drake's cameo, and Harper and Richard's vocals.

"Loving You No More" peaked at ninety-one on the Billboard Hot 100 on two occasions. Meanwhile, it peaked in the top twenty of both the US R&B/Hip-Hop Songs and Hot Rap Songs charts. The song's Gil Green-directed accompanying music video shows Combs, accompanied by Richard and Kalenna Harper, reminiscing on a past love in a mansion, and in a club scene with Drake. The group performed the song on BET's 106 & Park, during promotion of the album.

== Background ==
"Loving You No More" first leaked under the title "Hurt" on November 13, 2009. After being announced as the second single from Last Train to Paris on August 26, 2010, the mastered version of the song was leaked. In an interview with MTV News, Diddy explained the meaning behind the song, commenting, "The concept of the song is about when you love somebody so much that you forget about yourself. You love them more than you love yourself." The song's official remix, released on October 22, 2010, features American rappers Gucci Mane and Red Cafe. Producer and rapper Jermaine Dupri also remixed the song with rap vocals from him, which was unveiled on September 29, 2010. The group performed the song on one occasion, during their takeover of 106 & Park to promote the album, on December 16, 2010.

== Composition ==
Diddy-Dirty Money – "Loving You No More"
A sample of "Loving You No More" featuring vocals from Diddy and Richard, accompanied by a piano background.

The song is a mid-tempo R&B song, with a length of four minutes and six seconds. Including electronica influences, it has a piano-heavy beat, and has been described as "melodic". Diddy has lead vocals, with Kalenna Harper and Dawn Richard singing background and having full vocals in numerous parts. Diddy's lines feature the use of the auto-tune effect. The song also integrates hip-hop, featuring a rap cameo by Drake. Ed Easton, Jr. of WNOW-FM summed up the track as "an emotional track about losing touch with a significant other." According to Easton, the song also featured Diddy's signature "rhythmic talking disguised as singing."

== Reception ==
=== Critical reception ===
Sara D. Anderson of AOL Radio Blog said, "the duo's beautiful voices twist and soar around Drake's supple and soulful vocals". Although she commented that Drake's voice was "almost unrecognizable" on the track, Becky Bain of Idolator noted "how sweetly he comes off in this sensitive track". Bain also complimented Drake's part in the song, stating, "Drizzy kills it in his mellow verse in the middle, his raspy monotone fitting in quite well with the melancholy vibe of the song." A writer for Birthplace Magazine said the song was mixed with "a combination of slick production, strong vocals from Dirty Money songstresses Dawn and Kaleena, a guest appearance by Drake, and hype as only Diddy can deliver", and called the song and video "mainstream guilty pleasures we can enjoy"

=== Chart performance ===
Upon digital release, "Loving You No More" debuted on multiple Billboard charts. While debuting at numbers twenty-eight and twenty-one on the Hot R&B/Hip-Hop Songs and Rap Songs charts, respectively, it therefore appeared at ninety-one on the Billboard Hot 100. It fell off the Hot 100 the next week, but would go on in the following weeks to peak at number twenty on the R&B chart and seventeen on the rap chart. After the release of Last Train to Paris, the song re-entered the Hot 100 at its original peak, ninety-one.

== Music video ==
The song's accompanying music video was directed by Gil Green. In an interview with MTV News, Diddy explained the video, stating, "[The video] is really about me being in a relationship with a young lady and you're constantly loving this person, and hoping that this day comes where they change and they love you back." Additionally, Green said that the video shows "moments of him and his love but you can tell there's an emotional distance". The video was premiered on BET's 106 & Park on October 27, 2010.

=== Synopsis and reception ===
The video opens with a still image of a woman in her bikini (Manuela Arbeláez) while various scenery backdrops are superimposed in the background. The first scenes of the video flicker between Diddy's life with his femme fatale and Diddy singing with the rest of Dirty Money in the bedroom of a mansion. Some of the possessions in the house such as picture frames shatter as the chorus builds up. However, during Dawn Richard and Kalenna Harper's verses, the camera focus on Richard and Harper singing directly into the camera lens. As Drake's verse begins, Diddy falls backwards into a swimming pool in slow motion, while the camera image slowly fades into a club scene. There is a brief shot of a bottle of coconut-flavored Cîroc vodka before Diddy is scene mingling in the club. The camera mainly focus on Drake, who is observing what is happening and rapping his verse. During the bridge, Richard and Harper appear in the club and Diddy's femme fatale is seen in the background.

Ed Easton, Jr. of WNOW-FM gave the song six and a half out of ten stars, calling it "average". Easton said, "This is a rare situation, where the song was more of a draw than the actual video." Becky Bain of Idolator said "We have to applaud Diddy for only throwing one shot to Ciroq vodka during his club scene with Drizzy, as opposed to using the entire video as a three-minute commercial to promote his brand." Bain was referring to Combs' February 2010 video for "Ciroc Star", which did not appear on the final track listing of Last Train to Paris.

== Credits ==
Recording locations

- Recorded at Circle House Recording Studios in Miami, Florida
- Daddy's House Studios in New York City.

Personnel

- Steve "Rock Star" Dickey – engineer
- Team S. Dot – producer
- Sean Garrett – songwriter, producer
- Aubrey "Drake" Graham – songwriter, featured vocals
- Stefan Johnson – additional recording
- Nicholson Joseph Jr. – additional recording
- Jaycen Joshua – mixing
- Giancarlo Lino – mixing assistant
- Dawn Richard – songwriter, lead vocals
- Noah "40" Shebib – engineer
- Miykal Snoddy – songwriter, producer
- Matthew Testa – engineer
- Miles Walker – engineer
- Kevin "Kev-O" Wilson – mixing assistant
- Mario Winans – songwriter, keyboards

== Charts ==
Chart (2010–11)	Peak positions
US Billboard Hot 100	91
US Hot R&B/Hip-Hop Songs (Billboard)	20

=== Year-end ===
Chart (2011)	Position
US Hot R&B/Hip-Hop Songs (Billboard)	98

== Release history ==
Region	Date	Format	Label
United States	September 21, 2010	Digital Download	Bad Boy, Interscope Records
United States	September 21, 2010	Rhythmic airplay	Bad Boy, Interscope Records
