= Ass on the Floor =

2011 single by Diddy – Dirty Money

Single by Diddy – Dirty Money featuring Swizz Beatz

from the album Last Train to Paris
- Released: November 29, 2010
- Recorded: 2010
- Studio: Daddy’s House Recording Studio (New York City)
- Genre: Eurodance
- Length: 4:04
- Label: Bad Boy; Interscope
- Songwriters: Sean Combs; Kasseem Dean; Dawn Richard; Kalenna Vick; Leroy Watson
- Producer: Swizz Beatz

Diddy-Dirty Money singles chronology
"Your Love" (2011)	"Ass on the Floor" (2010)	"Someone to Love Me (Naked)" (2011)

Swizz Beatz singles chronology
"Everyday (Coolin')" (2011)	"Ass on the Floor" (2011)	"Can a Drummer Get Some?" (2011)

Alternate cover
- Monster Mondays promotion cover

"Ass on the Floor" (clean version: "A** on the Floor") is a song performed by Diddy and the duo Dirty Money, lifted from their debut album, Last Train to Paris. The song features guest vocals and production from record producer Swizz Beatz. It was released as the third US single taken from the album on 29 November 2010. "Ass on the Floor" was co-written by the lead performers, as well as Leroy Watson. Incorporating pounding drums and shimmering synthesizers, "Ass on the Floor" was praised by critics as one of the best songs on Last Train to Paris.

Most felt that the song had the potential to be heard in clubs around the world. An accompanying music video, filmed by Colin Tilley, has a cold icy theme and features the female members of Dirty Money taking the lead as the group poses for the camera across the winter wonderland-themed landscape. "Ass on the Floor" made its chart debut on the U.S. Hot R&B/Hip-Hop Songs chart at number eighty-eight. It has since peaked at number eighty.

== Background and composition ==
Diddy-Dirty Money - "Ass on the Floor"
A sample of "Ass on the Floor" with the Swizz Beatz-produced marching beat. Richard and Harper take lead with the vocals.

"Ass on the Floor" is an atmospheric dance-floor filler, first released as part of Swizz Beatz' Monster Mondays on November 29, 2010. Bradon Soderberg from The Village Voice pointed out the song's "swooping Moroder synths", which were described by MTV's Mawuse Ziegbe as "a spacey sheen of synth chords". Ziegbe also noted that the song's production recreated the rapid-fire drums from Major Lazer's 2009 song "Pon de Floor". "Ass on the Floor"'s production also consists of "pounding drums" and "glittery synthesizers" whilst the vocals focus primarily on Diddy-Dirty Money's two females, Dawn Richard and Kalenna Harper. Beatz handles the chorus (as well as the production) while Diddy drops a verse near the end of the song. According to Zeigbe, Harper and Richard's lyrics focus on "drowning their sorrows over a frustratingly volatile relationship", Beatz acts as the intermediary "commanding the lovelorn souls to forget the drama" while Diddy's melancholy lyrics "laments potent heartbreak in his verse". On February 11, 2011, "Ass on the Floor" was added to the B-playlist on the UK's biggest Urban music radio station, BBC Radio 1Xtra.

== Critical reception ==
Jamie from Freshness said the choice of visuals to accompany the single and "marching beat" means that the "chances are this fresh track with Swizz Beatz will be heard in clubs all over the world." Meanwhile, Jim Farber from the New York Daily News praised the song's directness saying "it puts you right there". Bradon Soderberg (of The Village Voice) singled "Ass on the Floor" out as one of the album's best songs. Jamie from Freshness said "With 'Ass on the Floor', the group not only opts for a heavy club vibe in terms of titling, but in sound as well... [which includes a] decisive marching beat". MTV's Mawuse Zeigbe praised the song for its emotional lyrics and production value. Zeigbe said "The vibe of the song definitely stays on track with the naked emotion the Bad Boy mogul promised on the trio's long-delayed effort, Last Train to Paris."

== Music video ==
According to Rap-Up magazine, the Colin Tilley directed clip premiered on December 13, 2010. It was released in the same week that videos for "Somebody to Love Me" and "Coming Home" were released, in the week leading up to the album's release. In the "winter wonderland"-themed clip Richard and Harper take the lead while Swizz Beatz and Diddy make background appearances.

Richard, Beatz, Harper and Diddy (from left to right) in the middle scene of the video, "A snow-filled backdrop bathed in blue light".

=== Synopsis ===
The video begins with a drummer beating his drum, snowflakes bounce up and down from the vibrations. Swizz Beatz appears in a snow-filled wooden crate surrounded by icicles, to rap his verse. Images of Dawn Richard and Kalenna Harper also flash on screen during the opening sequence. In the following scene Richard and Harper appear stood on floating blocks of ice in a cavern of water. Throughout their verses images of the drummer and Beatz in the crate also flash on screen. Some subtle camera effects such as superimposed imagery and split-screen lenses are also used. During the chorus, Beatz and Diddy appear sat on the bonnet of a white sports car as it snows around them. In the second and third verses Dirty Money and Beatz both appear in the snow filled backdrop but during Diddy's verse he appears alone in the same snow-filled crate that Beatz appeared in first. The video ends with two finals scenes, one where Diddy and Beatz appear together in the crate and one where Dirty Money appear in the snow filled landscape with heavy snow falling before the camera fades through black. Throughout the video there is a soft blue-tinged lighting effect.

=== Reception ===
Staff from E! Online were impressed with the clip saying that "although Diddy had shot a number of videos for the band's new album, 'Ass on the Floor' is the coolest—literally and artistically." They added, "just in time for blizzard season, the video features Dawn Richard and Kalenna Harper singing and dancing in the snow like ultrafoxy versions of the Snow Miser. In other words: It's icy hot!" Robbie Daw from Idolator was also impressed. He said "[the] somber dance jam 'Ass On The Floor' and its frosty visual are proving that old adage that third time’s a charm, [referring to the third video Diddy had released that week]. Maybe the winter wonderland displayed here is just getting us into the spirit of the season?".

== Promotion and remixes ==
Dirty Money made their debut performance of "Ass on the Floor" on the December 4, 2010 showing of Saturday Night Live. The group were joined on stage by Swizz Beatz for the performance. They also performed the song live on Jimmy Kimmel Live! on December 17, 2010, though this time they performed with Beatz.

Rapper Trina recorded a remix to "Ass on the Floor" in February 2010. The remix features a new verse, rapped by Trina, and will feature on the Trina (issued Valentine's Day, 2011). American songwriting and production duo The-Dream and Tricky Stewart were commissioned to produce an official remix for the song. Dubbed "Ass on the Floor (Remix)", the official remix leaves all of the original vocals but replaced the melody with a more "classic R&B" production.

== Track listing ==
- Digital download
  (as part of Swizz Beatz' Monster Mondays)
1. "Ass on the Floor" featuring Swizz Beatz - 4:04
- Remix
  (as part of Trina's Diamonds are Forever mixtape)
1. "Ass on the Floor (Remix)" featuring Trina and Swizz Beatz - 4:02
- UK Digital single
1. "Ass on the Floor" (Explicit) - 4:04
2. "Coming Home" (Dirty South Remix) - 6:56
3. "Coming Home" (Dirty South Vocal Remix) - 6:57

== Credits ==
"Ass on the Floor" was recorded at Daddy's House Recording Studios in New York City, NY.

- Songwriting - Sean "Diddy" Combs, Kasseem "Swizz Beatz" Dean, Dirty Money (Dawn Richard, Kalenna Vick), Leroy Watson
- Production - Swizz Beatz
- Keyboard arrangement - Tyrone Johnson
- Additional keyboards - Eric Hudson, Jeffrey "J-Dub" Walker
- Engineered by Matthew Testa, Steve "Rock Star" Dickey, Pat Viala
- Mixing - Jaycen Joshua, Jesus Garncia (assistant)
- Lead vocals - Diddy, Dirty Money
- Featured vocals - Swizz Beatz

== Charts ==
Chart (2010–11)	Peak position
Belgium (Ultratip Bubbling Under Flanders)	26
Germany Youth Airplay Chart (Nielsen)	12
UK Singles (The Official Charts Company)	187
US Hot R&B/Hip-Hop Songs (Billboard)	80
US Dance Club Songs (Billboard)	27

== Release history ==
Country	Date	Format	Label
Worldwide	November 29, 2010	Free download (from Monster Mondays)	Bad Boy, Interscope Records
United Kingdom	February 11, 2011	Urban music radio	Polydor Records
United Kingdom	April 18, 2011	Digital download	Polydor Records
