= Hello Good Morning =

2010 single by Diddy – Dirty Money featuring T.I. and Rick Ross

Single by Diddy – Dirty Money featuring T.I.

from the album Last Train to Paris
- B-side: "Angels"
- Released: March 30, 2010
- Studio: Los Angeles, California; (Chalice Recording Studios)
- Genre: Electro-dance
- Length: 4:23
- Label: Bad Boy; Interscope
- Songwriters: Marcella Araica; Richard Butler; Clifford Harris; Nathaniel Hills
- Producer: Danja

Diddy - Dirty Money singles chronology
| "Love Come Down" (2009) | "Hello Good Morning" (2010) | "Loving You No More" (2010) |

T.I. singles chronology
| "I'm Back" (2010) | "Hello Good Morning" (2010) | "Winner" (2010) |

Alternative cover
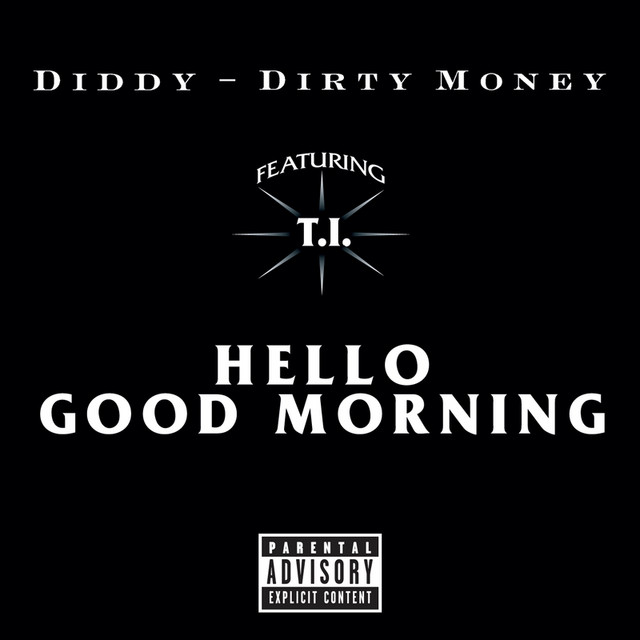
- Initial release cover

"Hello Good Morning" is a song by American R&B trio Diddy – Dirty Money, composed of rapper Sean "Diddy" Combs, and R&B singers Kalenna Harper and Dawn Richard, released on March 30, 2010 as the first single from their debut studio album, Last Train to Paris. The electronic dance song incorporates an acid squelch section in the middle eight, and was written by Marcella Araica, Richard "Rico Love" Butler, Clifford "T.I." Harris and Nathaniel "Danja" Hills; the latter also handled its production. Southern rapper T.I. guest performs a verse on the song and Miami-based rapper Rick Ross guest performs on the music video and official remixed versions, the latter of which replaces T.I.'s portion with a verse by rapper Nicki Minaj.

The song's musical composition was inspired by Diddy's experiences in Ibiza night clubs; its lyrics focus on sex, money and hedonism. Alongside the aforementioned remix, a "Grime Remix" with Skepta and a "Team UK remix" with Tinchy Stryder and Tinie Tempah were also released. Critics noted the track as one of the better songs from Last Train to Paris, with praise for Danja's production. However, its lyrics were criticized for being superficial and lacking substance. An accompanying music video, filmed by Hype Williams, features the trio parting in various nightclub settings in Los Angeles; Diddy also drives through a city during the nighttime, and T.I. performs his verse in a hotel. It was inspired by the 1995 film Heat. An edited version of the clip was made for the official remix, and a completely new street party-themed video was filmed for the grime remix.

"Hello Good Morning" was promoted with several live television performances, including season nine of American Idol and Friday Night with Jonathan Ross. "Hello Good Morning" was the album and group's first song to enter the Billboard Hot 100, where it peaked at number 27. The song received gold certification by the Recording Industry Association of America (RIAA) for selling in excess of 500,000 copies. Internationally, the single peaked at number 22 on the UK Singles Chart, and was particularly successful on the German Black Chart and UK R&B Charts, where it reached numbers one and eight, respectively.

== Composition ==
Diddy-Dirty Money – "Hello Good Morning"
Richard and Harper exchanging lyrics about "sex and money" with Diddy and then the start of T.I.'s verse.

"Hello Good Morning" was written by Marcella Araica, Richard Butler, T.I., Nathaniel "Danja" Hills. The song, which features T.I. and was produced by Danja, is an electro-dance song influenced by Diddy's experiences in Ibiza where he visited the DC10 nightclub. The music influences included "Felix da Housecat, Erick Morillo, Deep Dish and DJ Hell". According to Rap-Up magazine, the lyrics refer to "keeping a party going till early hours of the morning" and find Diddy returning to his signature ad-libs. Nicki Escudero from The Phoenix New Times noted the song's superficial themes which included lyrics about "sex, money and cheating" Brandon Soderberg from The Village Voice noted the song's bridge where there was an "epic acid-squelch breakdown".

== Remixes ==
Several official remixes were released alongside the video to promote the song. The first of these remixes added an introduction verse from rapper Rick Ross and then a new verse later in the song from female rapper, Nicki Minaj. Labelled the "Official Remix", it was released in the United States on June 29, 2010 for digital download. A music video for this version was created by adding additional footage to the original video. It premiered on June 21, 2010. A second remix featuring just Ross's additional verse was used for the song's main music video which premiered on May 11, 2010 A third remix was made for the UK, titled the "Team UK Remix". This version featured Tinie Tempah, Tinchy Stryder, Chip and Truth in place of Minaj and Ross. It premiered on June 11, 2010 on Tim Westwood's Radio 1Xtra daytime show Westwood. It was released as track two on the UK Digital EP single, released June 20, 2010. A final remix was created after Diddy highlighted his intent to find a UK emcee to record a new version of the song with him. Skepta was chosen for the remix, which was released as the "Official Grime Remix". It is the only remix which alters the song's production, and was released only in the UK, on August 12, 2010. A video for the grime remix was released on November 5, 2010. On January 5, 2010, MTV reported the emergence of a new remix of "Hello Good Morning". The new remix replaces T.I.'s vocals with a new verse from Eminem. D.L. Chandler from MTV said "Slim Shady’s humorous verses sound right at home over producer Danja’s club-ready banger."

== Critical reception ==
In a review by USA Today, "Hello Good Morning" was picked out as one of the best three songs on the Last Train to Paris. Nick Levine of Digital Spy gave the song three out of five stars in his review for the song, stating that although Dirty Money promised a new sound the song sounded like "Timba–pop, albeit one with a better-than-average hook." He continued, "in Diddy's final-minute rap, [it's] a reminder of how he jump-started his journey towards a reported $300m fortune and a butler called Fonzworth Bentley." Matt from Above&Beyond said it was the Danja-produced beat and the T.I. feature that make the song good. Fraser McAlpine of BBC Music said "Diddy seems to have abandoned conventional rapping in favour of some Kanye–style automooing. He's quite good at it, too. Adds a certain nasal edge to proceedings. There's a middle bit, and it's like nothing else in the song... It sounds more like someone doing the "I've lost my keys" song, just before they leave the house in the morning. The odd thing is that it was left in there. I mean if minimal is your bag, surely that'd be the first bit to cut?" He awarded in four out of five stars. Becky Bain of Idolator was also positive about the song, saying, "Lyrically and stylistically, it’s a pretty standard club track—over various synth beats, the song covers the usual topics: hot girls dancing, crowds waiting to have fun, and spending time in a five star suite with some five star freaks getting high all week... But honestly, we’re just overjoyed this song isn’t just a thinly-veiled four-minute commercial for any one of Diddy’s various products."

However Nicki Escudero of the Phoenix New Times said that although the song was good for what it is, it lacked substance. "Now that Diddy-Dirty Money has had success with a superficial track about money, sex and cheating, here's hoping the group will release a deeper song about something more meaningful. Unfortunately, hope can only go so far." Meanwhile, Michael Cragg from The Guardian's music blog commented that the UK remix featuring Skepta salvages what would otherwise be a boring Diddy track. "Thankfully, UK grime king, Skepta, has rescued the song by pushing Diddy to the periphery – his flow consists of going 'uh', 'Skepta' and spelling out 'D.I.D.D.Y.# – setting off a smorgasbord of sonic explosions, tightening the whole thing up and making it sound a lot darker and more thrilling than a host of US producers could manage. Skepta also drops the following immortal line in the first verse: 'I like tea, but I don't like crumpets.' A man after my own heart."

== Chart performance ==
Two weeks after Diddy–Dirty Money's appearance on American Idol, "Hello Good Morning" debuted on the U.S. Hot Digital Songs chart at No. 17, and the single debuted on the U.S. Billboard Hot 100 at No. 34. Eventually the song peaked at No. 27 on the Hot 100 in the chart week dated July 24, 2010. At the time of its charting, it was the first single from Last Train to Paris to appear on the Billboard Hot 100. Consequently, the song became Diddy's best charting Hot 100 single since his 2007 hit single "Last Night" with Keyshia Cole, as well as his eleventh top-thirty Hot 100 single. In comparison, "Hello Good Morning" is Dawn Richard's second lowest charting Hot 100 single, but first appearance on the chart since 2008's "Damaged" as part of girlgroup, Danity Kane. For Kalenna Harper, it is her first Hot 100 chart appearance. T.I., who is featured on the song, received his highest Hot 100 chart peak, since his 2009 single "Dead and Gone" with Justin Timberlake. On August 18, 2010, the Recording Industry Association of America (RIAA) certified the single gold for selling at least 500,000 copies. On the official end of year charts, compiled by Billboard, "Hello Good Morning" ranked at No. 29 on the U.S. Hot Rap Songs chart and No. 65 on the Hot R&B/Hip-Hop Songs chart.

Additionally the single proved successful on urban charts around the world. "Hello Good Morning" peaked at No. 8 on the U.S. Hot Rap Songs chart and No. 13 on the U.S. Hot R&B/Hip-Hop Songs chart. In Germany, it topped the Deutsche Black Charts (German Black Charts) while reaching top-ten on the United Kingdom's R&B Singles Chart and No. 24 on Australia's Urban Singles Chart. On the main singles charts, the song was most successful in the UK, where it charted at No. 22 on the UK Singles Chart. At the time of release, it became T.I.'s best UK charting single since 2009's "Dead and Gone", and his overall joint sixth-best charting UK single along with 2006's "Why You Wanna". In the rest of Europe the single had mixed success, reaching the top-twenty in Belgium, on both the Ultratip Flemish and Wallonian single charts. In Canada the single managed to chart at No. 55, and in Australia it peaked at No. 44. According to a press release by Interscope Records, as of March 25, 2011, "Hello Good Morning" has sold 1 million digital downloads worldwide.

== Music video ==
=== Background and concept ===
The final scene of the video where Dawn, Diddy and Kalenna (L to R) pose for the camera, against a backdrop of fireworks.

The music video for "Hello Good Morning" was directed by Hype Williams, and premiered on May 11, 2010, through the group's official VEVO account. Later on May 23, 2010, a behind the scenes video was released, revealing that the video was filmed in Agua Dulce, California and Los Angeles. Swizz Beatz, Rico Love and Rick Ross all make cameos in the video. The video uses a remix of the song which is the same as the album version, but features an introduction rap from Ross. Dawn Richard said the concept of the video was based on the 1995 film Heat starring Robert De Niro and Al Pacino. T.I.'s scenes were amongst the last to be filmed, and took place in an apartment in Bel Aire, CA.

=== Synopsis ===
The opening scene begins with panoramic camera shots of a helicopter flying over Los Angeles (specifically around Staples Center), at night. Then during Rick Ross's verse the female members of the group appear posing in the background while Ross raps for the camera. Swizz Beatz and Rico Love make cameos alongside Ross. In a third scene, Diddy can be seen driving through the city at night in a black Bugatti Veyron. For the song's chorus, Dawn Richard and Kalenna Harper take the lead, ordering drinks in a bar and enjoying the night club. A fourth scene for T.I.'s verse sees the camera focus on T.I. serenading two women in an apartment. Throughout the video the images flicker between the various scenes. In the final part of the video, and during the bridge, all three members of the group appear outside against a backdrop of thick smoke and bright red fireworks. There is a final flash of fireworks before the camera fades completely, to black.

=== Remix videos ===
The official remix video premiered on June 21, 2010, this version features Rick Ross and Nicki Minaj. The music video takes footage from the original version, but adds several new scenes. When Diddy drives through LA at night, the scene was refilmed with Minaj as his front seat passenger. Additionally there is another new scene where Minaj, in a blue curly wig, raps some of her verse against a dark backdrop. For the "Grime Remix" of the song, a completely new video was filmed in Glasgow, Scotland on November 5, 2010 and features cameos from Boy Better Know & Chipmunk. In this version, Diddy-Dirty Money and Skepta pose for the camera in an elevator before joining Chipmunk and Boy Better Know, backstage at a gig. The cameras follow the group and their guests as they move around backstage partying and walking the streets at night.

== Live performances ==
Diddy–Dirty Money performed "Hello Good Morning" live for the first time on March 31, 2010, on the ninth season of American Idol. The next performance did not come until June 4, 2010, this time on Good Morning America. They then reprised the performance five days later on French TV show, Le Grand Journal. On June 12, 2010, the group performed (with guest drummer Matt Helders of Arctic Monkeys) on Friday Night with Jonathan Ross. Dirty Money later performed "Hello Good Morning" at the 2010 Teen Choice Awards on August 9, 2010.

== Track listing ==
- Digital download
1. "Hello Good Morning" featuring T.I. – 4:23
- Digital Download – Grime Remix
1. "Hello Good Morning" featuring Skepta – 2:39
- Digital download – Official Remix
1. "Hello Good Morning" featuring Nicki Minaj and Rick Ross – 3:27
- Digital EP
1. "Hello Good Morning" featuring T.I. – 4:31
2. "Hello Good Morning" featuring Tinie Tempah and Tinchy Stryder – 3:46
3. "Hello Good Morning" (Music Video) featuring T.I. – 4:43
- Swiss digital single
1. "Hello Good Morning" featuring T.I. (Explicit Radio Edit) – 4:05
2. "Angels" (Explicit Album Version) featuring Notorious B.I.G. – 5:13

== Credits and personnel ==
"Hello Good Morning" was recorded at Chalice Recording Studios in Los Angeles, California and mixed at Larrabee Studios in Universal City, California.

- Marcella Araica – songwriter, engineer
- Richard "Rico Love" Butler – songwriter, vocal production
- Smith Carlson – assistant engineer
- Sean "Diddy" Combs – lead vocals
- Steve "Rock Star" Dickey – engineer
- Clifford "T.I." Harris – songwriter, featured vocals
- Nathaniel "Danja" Hills – songwriter, producer, instruments
- Jaycen Joshua – mixing
- Giancarlo Lino – mixing
- Dirty Money (Dawn Richard, Kalenna Harper) – lead vocals, vocal production
- Jared Newcomb – assistant engineer
- Edward Sanders – assistant engineer
- Matthew Testa – engineer

== Charts and certifications ==
=== Weekly charts ===
| Chart (2010) | Peak position |
|---|---|
| Australia (ARIA) | 94 |
| Australian Urban (ARIA) | 24 |
| Belgium (Ultratip Bubbling Under Flanders) | 12 |
| Belgium (Ultratip Bubbling Under Wallonia) | 19 |
| Canada Hot 100 (Billboard) | 55 |
| European Hot 100 Singles (Billboard) | 69 |
| German Black Chart | 1 |
| Ireland (IRMA) | 41 |
| Scottish Singles Sales (Official Charts) | 26 |
| Switzerland (Schweizer Hitparade) | 65 |
| UK Singles (Official Charts) | 22 |
| UK Hip Hop/R&B (Official Charts) | 9 |
| US Billboard Hot 100 | 27 |
| US Hot R&B/Hip-Hop Songs (Billboard) | 13 |
| US Hot Rap Songs (Billboard) | 8 |
| US Pop Airplay (Billboard) | 38 |
| US Rhythmic Airplay (Billboard) | 17 |

=== Yearly charts ===
| Chart (2010) | Peak position |
|---|---|
| US Hot Rap Songs | 29 |
| US Hot R&B/Hip-Hop Songs | 65 |

=== Certifications ===
| Country | Provider | Certification |
|---|---|---|
| United States | RIAA | Gold |

== Radio and release history ==
=== Radio add dates ===
| Region | Date | Format |
|---|---|---|
| United States | April 27, 2010 | Rhythmic crossover |
| United States | May 18, 2010 | Mainstream radio |

=== Purchasable release ===
| Region | Date | Format / Version | Label |
|---|---|---|---|
| United States | March 30, 2010 | Digital download | Bad Boy Records |
| Australia | April 9, 2010 | Digital download | Universal Music |
| Belgium | April 12, 2010 | Digital download | Universal Music |
| Switzerland | April 12, 2010 | Digital download | Universal Music |
| Germany | June 11, 2010 | Digital download | Universal Music |
| Switzerland | June 11, 2010 | Digital single | Universal Music |
| United Kingdom | June 18, 2010 | Digital Download | Polydor Records |
| United Kingdom | June 20, 2010 | Digital EP | Polydor Records |
| United States | June 29, 2010 | Digital download; Official Remix | Bad Boy Records |
| United Kingdom | August 12, 2010 | Digital download; Grime Remix | Polydor Records |
