= Skylar Grey discography =

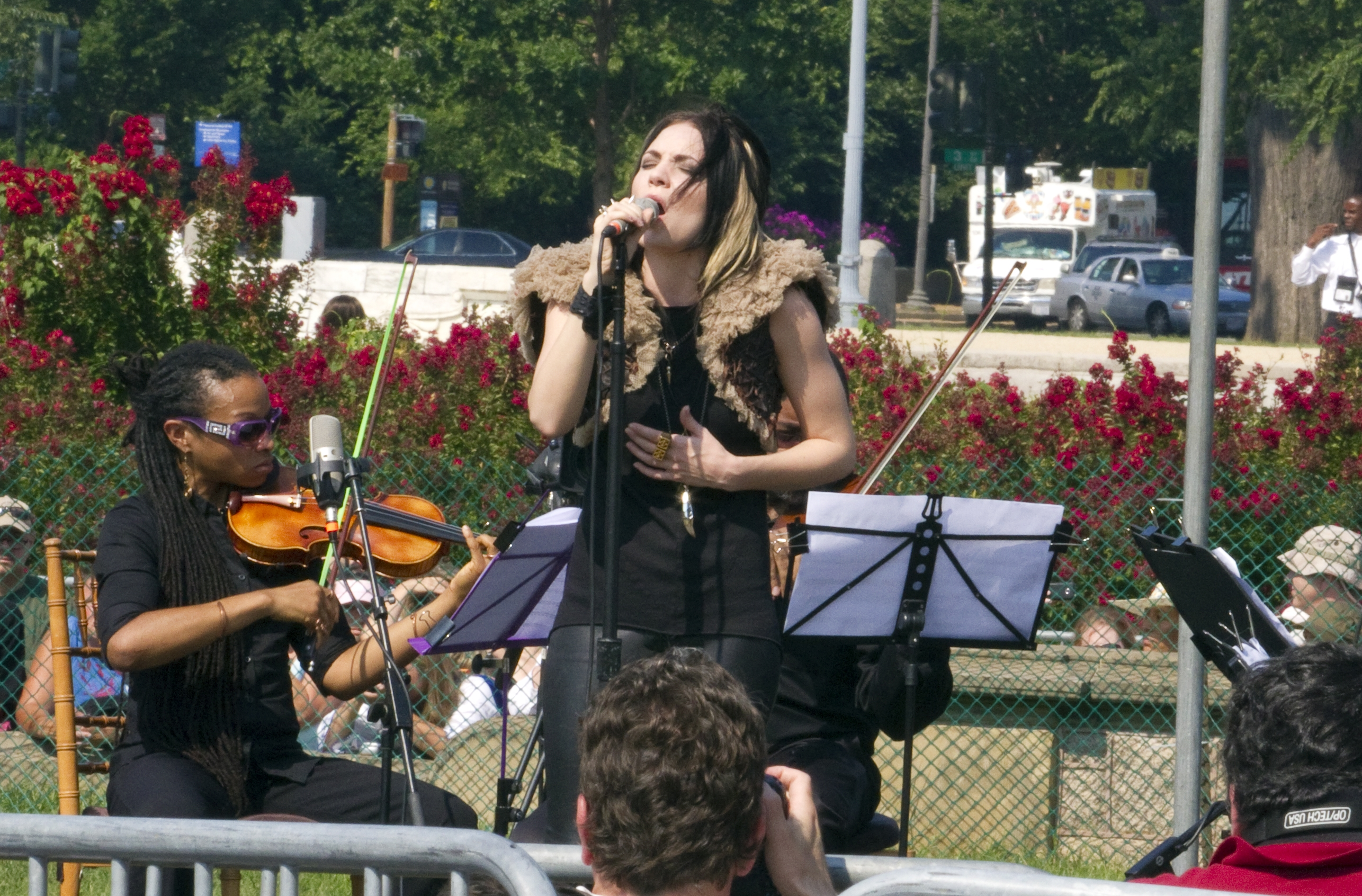
- Skylar Grey singing at the Tibet Talk for World Peace in July 2011
- Studio albums: 4
- Extended plays: 7
- Singles: 21
- Music videos: 14

The discography of Skylar Grey (formerly Holly Brook), an American singer-songwriter, consists of four studio albums, seven extended plays (EPs), 21 singles (including nine as a featured artist) and 14 music videos. Grey was signed to Machine Shop Recordings under the name Holly Brook. She released her debut album Like Blood Like Honey in 2006, but was released from her contract after it did not perform commercially. She began working under the name Skylar Grey in 2010, co-writing the three versions of "Love the Way You Lie" with Alex da Kid, who signed her to his Wonderland Music (now KidinaKorner) label. Grey later left KIDinaKORNER/Interscope records and is an independent artist.

== Albums ==
=== Studio albums ===
List of studio albums, with selected chart positions and certifications
Title	Album details	Peak chart positions					Sales
Title	Album details	US	US Digital	BEL (FL)	CAN	FRA	Sales
Like Blood Like Honey (Note: as Holly Brook)	Released: June 6, 2006; Label: Machine Shop, Warner Bros.; Format: CD, digital download	— (Note: Like Blood Like Honey did not enter the US Billboard 200, but peaked at number 26 on the US Heatseekers Albums chart.)	—	—	—	—	
Don't Look Down	Released: July 9, 2013; Label: KIDinaKORNER, Interscope; Format: CD, digital download	8	4	—	25	—	US: 62,000
Natural Causes	Released: September 23, 2016; Label: KIDinaKORNER, Interscope; Format: CD, digital download	—	—	193	68	115	
Skylar Grey	Released: April 28, 2022; Label: Self-released; Format: CD, digital download	—	—	—	—	—	
Angel With Tattoos	Released: October 24, 2025; Label: Self-released; Format: CD, digital download	—	—	—	—	—	
Wasted Potential	Released: May 22, 2026; Label: Self-released; Format: CD, digital download	—	—	—	—	—	
"—" denotes an album that did not chart or was not released in that territory.

=== Compilation albums ===
List of compilation albums, with selected details
Title	Album details
Lofi Chill Vibes with Skylar Grey (Deluxe) (Note: "Lofi Chill Vibes With Skylar Grey (Deluxe)" is a collaboration album with nom de plume and lonelyboy, contains Lo-fi versions of her hits.)	Released: August 11, 2023; Label: lonelyboy sound; Format: Digital download

== Extended plays ==
List of extended plays with selected details
Title	EP details
Holly Brook EP	Released: October 11, 2005; Label: Machine Shop, Warner Bros.; Format: Digital download
Sony CONNECT Sets	Released: 2005; Label: Machine Shop, Warner Bros., Sony; Format: Digital download
O'Dark:Thirty EP	Released: June 10, 2010; Label: Self-released; Format: CD, digital download
The Buried Sessions of Skylar Grey	Released: January 17, 2012; Label: KIDinaKORNER, Interscope; Format: Digital download
iTunes Session	Released: October 15, 2013; Label: KIDinaKORNER, Interscope; Format: Digital download
Angel With Tattoos	Released: October 18, 2019; Label: Self-released; Format: Digital download
Make It Through the Day	Released: November 6, 2020; Label: Self-released; Format: Digital download

== Singles ==
=== As lead artist ===
List of singles as lead artist, with selected chart positions and certifications, showing year released and album name
Title	Year	Peak chart positions										Certifications	Album
Title	Year	US	US Dance	US Pop	AUS	BEL (FL)	CAN	GER	IRE	NZ	UK	Certifications	Album
"Invisible"	2011	—	10	—	—	—	—	86	—	—	63		Non-album singles
"Dance Without You"	2011	—	—	—	—	—	—	—	—	—	—		Non-album singles
"C'mon Let Me Ride" (featuring Eminem)	2012	—	—	33	—	87	82	—	52	17	—	RMNZ: Gold	Don't Look Down
"Get Lucky"	2013	—	—	—	—	—	—	—	—	—	—		Non-album single
"Final Warning"	2013	—	—	—	—	—	—	—	—	—	—		Don't Look Down
"Wear Me Out"	2013	—	—	—	—	—	—	—	—	—	—		Don't Look Down
"White Suburban"	2013	—	—	—	—	—	—	—	—	—	—		Don't Look Down
"Words"	2015	—	—	—	—	—	—	—	—	—	—		The Buried Sessions of Skylar Grey
"Addicted to Love"	2015	—	—	—	—	—	—	—	—	—	—		Endless Love
"Cannonball" (featuring X Ambassadors)	2015	—	—	—	—	—	—	—	—	—	—		Non-album single
"Moving Mountains"	2016	—	—	—	—	—	—	—	—	—	—		Natural Causes
"Off Road"	2016	—	—	—	—	—	—	—	—	—	—		Natural Causes
"Come Up for Air"	2016	—	—	—	—	—	—	—	—	—	—		Natural Causes
"Lemonade"	2016	—	—	—	—	—	—	—	—	—	—		Natural Causes
"Kill for You" (featuring Eminem)	2016	—	—	—	—	—	84	—	—	—	—		Natural Causes
"Stand by Me"	2018	—	—	—	—	—	—	—	—	—	—		Non-album single
"Everything I Need"	2018	—	—	—	—	—	—	—	—	— (Note: "Everything I Need" did not enter the NZ Top 40 Singles Chart, but peaked at number 28 on the NZ Hot Singles Chart.)	—		Aquaman
"Shame on You"	2019	—	—	—	—	—	—	—	—	—	—		Angel with Tattoos
"Angel with Tattoos"	2019	—	—	—	—	—	—	—	—	—	—		Angel with Tattoos
"Calling from the Heavens"	2019	—	—	—	—	—	—	—	—	—	—		Non-album single
"Dark Thoughts"	2020	—	—	—	—	—	—	—	—	—	—		Make It Through the Day
"Goosebumps"	2020	—	—	—	—	—	—	—	—	—	—		Make It Through the Day
"Sunscreen"	2020	—	—	—	—	—	—	—	—	—	—		Non-album singles
"Claws" (with Elliott Taylor)	2020	—	—	—	—	—	—	—	—	—	—		Non-album singles
"Fucking Crazy"	2020	—	—	—	—	—	—	—	—	—	—		Make It Through the Day
"Sideways"	2020	—	—	—	—	—	—	—	—	—	—		Make It Through the Day
"The Devil Made Me Do It" (featuring B.o.B)	2020	—	—	—	—	—	—	—	—	—	—		Non-album single
"Make It Through the Day"	2020	—	—	—	—	—	—	—	—	—	—		Make It Through the Day
"Partly Cloudy with a Chance of Tears"	2021	—	—	—	—	—	—	—	—	—	—		Skylar Grey
"Last One Standing" (featuring Polo G, Mozzy and Eminem)	2021	78	—	—	70	—	38	84	—	— (Note: "Last One Standing" did not enter the NZ Top 40 Singles Chart, but peaked at number 2 on the NZ Hot Singles Chart.)	46	RIAA: Gold	Venom: Let There Be Carnage (Original Motion Picture Soundtrack)
"Vampire at the Swimming Pool"	2021	—	—	—	—	—	—	—	—	—	—		Skylar Grey
"Falling Apart"	2022	—	—	—	—	—	—	—	—	—	—		Skylar Grey
"Show Me Where It Hurts"	2022	—	—	—	—	—	—	—	—	—	—		Skylar Grey
"Love the Way You Lie (Part III)"	2023	—	—	—	—	—	—	—	—	—	—		Non-album singles
"Gangsta" (with Wolter Wythe)	2023	—	—	—	—	—	—	—	—	—	—		Non-album singles
"Numb" (with Tommee Profitt)	2024	—	—	—	—	—	—	—	—	—	—		Covers (Vol. 2)
"I See You" (with Dabin & Nurko)	2025	—	—	—	—	—	—	—	—	—	—		Aura Park
"Make Me Forget" (with Audien)	2025	—	—	—	—	—	—	—	—	—	—		First Love
"Glorious, Pt II"	2025	—	—	—	—	—	—	—	—	—	—		Angel with Tattoos
"Sober (You Make Me Wanna Be)"	2025	—	—	—	—	—	—	—	—	—	—		Angel with Tattoos
"Nirvana"	2025	—	—	—	—	—	—	—	—	—	—		Wasted Potential
"Motivation"	2026	—	—	—	—	—	—	—	—	—	—		Wasted Potential
"Come"	2026	—	—	—	—	—	—	—	—	—	—		Wasted Potential
"Black n' Blue"	2026	—	—	—	—	—	—	—	—	—	—		Wasted Potential
"Plastic Water Bottles"	2026	—	—	—	—	—	—	—	—	—	—		Wasted Potential
"Bullshit"	2026	—	—	—	—	—	—	—	—	—	—		Wasted Potential
"—" denotes a single that did not chart or was not released in that territory.

=== As featured artist ===
List of singles as featured artist, with selected chart positions and certifications, showing year released and album name
Title	Year	Peak chart positions										Certifications	Album
Title	Year	US	AUS	BEL	CAN	GER	IRE	NL	NZ	SWI	UK	Certifications	Album
"Where'd You Go" (Fort Minor featuring Holly Brook and Jonah Matranga)	2005	4	41	56	7	18	—	15	14	62	—	RIAA: Platinum	The Rising Tied
"Hero 2.0" (Badassjackson featuring Holly Brook)	2010	—	—	—	—	—	—	—	—	—	—		Non-album single
"Coming Home" (Diddy–Dirty Money featuring Skylar Grey)	2010	11	4	17	7	4	3	14	5	1	4	RIAA: 2× Platinum; ARIA: 5× Platinum; BPI: Platinum; IFPI SWI: Platinum	Last Train to Paris
"I Need a Doctor" (Dr. Dre featuring Eminem and Skylar Grey)	2011	4	12	47	8	25	11	55	23	33	8	RIAA: 2× Platinum; ARIA: 4× Platinum; BPI: Platinum; RMNZ: Platinum	Non-album single
"Words I Never Said" (Lupe Fiasco featuring Skylar Grey)	2011	89	—	—	—	—	—	—	—	—	—		Lasers
"Room for Happiness" (Kaskade featuring Skylar Grey)	2012	—	—	—	—	—	—	—	—	—	—		Fire & Ice
"Shot Me Down" (David Guetta featuring Skylar Grey)	2014	— (Note: "Bad" did not enter the US Billboard Hot 100, but peaked at number 3 on the US Bubbling Under Hot 100 Singles chart.)	3	3	66	13	7	8	20	6	4	ARIA: 2× Platinum; BPI: Gold; IFPI SWI: Gold; MC: Gold; RMNZ: Gold	Listen
"The Last Day" (Moby featuring Skylar Grey)	2014	—	—	—	—	—	—	—	—	—	—		Innocents
"Bed of Lies" (Nicki Minaj featuring Skylar Grey)	2014	62	7	100	41	—	56	—	13	—	73	ARIA: 2× Platinum; RMNZ: Platinum	The Pinkprint
"Beneath With Me" (Kaskade and deadmau5 featuring Skylar Grey)	2016	—	—	—	—	—	—	—	—	—	—		Non-album single
"Periscope" (Papa Roach featuring Skylar Grey)	2017	—	—	—	—	—	—	—	—	—	—		Crooked Teeth
"Glorious" (Macklemore featuring Skylar Grey)	2017	49	2	35	27	15	49	24	1	21	23	ARIA: 6× Platinum; BPI: Platinum; MC: 2× Platinum; RMNZ: 6× Platinum; RIAA: 3× Platinum	Gemini
"Mai Tais" (Train featuring Skylar Grey)	2019	—	—	—	—	—	—	—	—	—	—		Non-album single
"Held Up" (Elliott Taylor featuring Skylar Grey)	2020	—	—	—	—	—	—	—	—	—	—		Broke Down
"From The Ashes" (Illenium featuring Skylar Grey)	2022	—	—	—	—	—	—	—	—	—	—		Illenium
"My Heart Has Teeth" (deadmau5 featuring Skylar Grey)	2022	—	—	—	—	—	—	—	—	—	—		Non-album singles
"I'll Wait For You" (Seven Lions & Subtronics featuring Skylar Grey)	2024	—	—	—	—	—	—	—	—	—	—		Non-album singles
"Nervous" (Elliott Taylor featuring Masked Wolf & Skylar Grey)	2025	—	—	—	—	—	—	—	—	—	—		Non-album singles
"R.I.P." (Motionless in White featuring Skylar Grey)	2026	—	—	—	—	—	—	—	—	—	—		Decades
"—" denotes a single that did not chart or was not released in that territory.

=== Promotional singles ===
List of promotional singles, with selected chart positions, showing year released and album name
Title	Year	Peak chart positions							Album
Title	Year	US Bub.	US Pop	CAN	CAN Pop	FRA	POR	UK	Album
"Tower (Don't Look Down)"	2013	—	—	—	—	—	—	—	Don't Look Down
"New National Anthem" (T.I. and Skylar Grey)	2014	—	—	—	—	—	—	—	Paperwork
"I Know You"	2015	11	34	80	28	71	24	127	Fifty Shades of Grey
"Black Magic" (Eminem and Skylar Grey)	2020	6	—	77	—	—	—	100	Music to Be Murdered By – Side B
"Walking On Fire" (Skylar Grey and Th3rdstream )	2022	—	—	—	—	—	—	—	Non-album single
"—" denotes a single that did not chart or was not released in that territory.

== Other charted and certified songs ==
List of other charted and certified songs, with selected chart positions and certifications, showing year released and album name
Title	Year	Peak chart positions					Certifications	Album
Title	Year	US Bub.	US R&B	US Pop Digital	AUS	UK	Certifications	Album
"Coming Home (Part II)"	2012	24	—	35	—	—		The Buried Sessions of Skylar Grey and Don't Look Down
"Back From the Dead" (featuring Travis Barker and Big Sean)	2013	—	—	42	—	—		Don't Look Down
"Asshole" (Eminem featuring Skylar Grey)	2013	—	52	—	—	—	RMNZ: Gold	The Marshall Mathers LP 2
"Rise" (David Guetta featuring Skylar Grey)	2014	—	—	—	—	136		Listen
"I Will Return"	2015	—	—	—	100	—		Furious 7
"Wreak Havoc"	2016	—	—	40	—	190		Suicide Squad
"Leaving Heaven" (Eminem featuring Skylar Grey)	2020	—	—	—	—	—	ARIA: Gold	Music to Be Murdered By
"—" denotes a song that did not chart or was not released in that territory.

== Guest appearances ==
Key
†	Indicates soundtrack

List of non-single guest appearances, with other performing artists, showing year released and album name
Title	Year	Album	Artist(s)	Ref.
"Here Comes the Rain Again"	2004	Dozi Goes DJ Swiss	none	
"Follow Me"	2004	Dozi Goes DJ Swiss	none	
"How Was I to Know"	2004	Dozi Goes DJ Swiss	none	
"Be Somebody"	2005	The Rising Tied	Fort Minor, Lupe Fiasco	
"Get What I Want"	2007	Happily N'Ever After	Jaron Lowenstein	
"How to Believe"	2008	Tinker Bell and the Great Fairy Rescue	none	
"And Now We Sing"	2009	Whisper House	Duncan Sheik	
"No Sad Tomorrow"	2009	Wanna Snuggle?	Apathy, Mike Mass	
"Victim"	2009	Wanna Snuggle?	Apathy, Mike Mass	
"Just Like This"	2009	Love N' Dancing	none	
"All I Want is Love"	2009	Listen	Duncan Sheik, Spring Awakening Cast Members	
"Something to Live For"	2009	EP	Caitlin Moe	
"Going Under"	2011	Forget About the Cameras	Jensen Reed	
"Dance Without You (Ricky Luna Remix)"	2011	Step Up Revolution	none	
"Our House"	2012	Welcome to: Our House	Slaughterhouse, Eminem	
"Rescue Me"	2012	Welcome to: Our House	Slaughterhouse	
"Building a Monster"	2012	Frankenweenie Unleashed!	none	
"Slowly Freaking Out"	2013	The Host: Choose to Listen	none	
"Love Bullets"	2013	#willpower	will.i.am	
"Raindrops"	2013	The Foundation EP	David Heartbreak, The Partysquad	
"Asshole"	2013	The Marshall Mathers LP 2	Eminem	
"Hero"	2014	Need for Speed	Kid Cudi	
"Warning You"	2014	none	50 Cent	
"Tonight"	2014	Rose Colored Bass	David Heartbreak	
"Twisted"	2014	Shady XV	Eminem, Yelawolf	
"Rise"	2014	Listen	David Guetta	
"I Know You"	2015	Fifty Shades of Grey	none	
"I Will Return"	2015	Furious 7	none	
"Wreak Havoc"	2016	Suicide Squad: The Album	none	
"O Come Emmanuel"	2017	Kaskade Christmas	Kaskade	
"Tragic Endings"	2017	Revival	Eminem	
"Say You Love Me"	2018	Nice to Meet You	Seeb	
"Signed, Sealed, Delivered I'm Yours"	2018	Motown Magic	None	
"Runaway Train"	2019	Runaway Train	Jamie N Commons, Gallant	
"New Kind of Love"	2019	Four Weddings and a Funeral	None	
"Leaving Heaven"	2020	Music to Be Murdered By	Eminem	
"Black Magic"	2020	Music to Be Murdered By – Side B	Eminem	
"The Last Day"	2021	Reprise	Moby, Darlingside	
"Temporary"	2024	The Death of Slim Shady (Coup de Grâce)	Eminem	
"Past Yesterday"	2024	Beautifully Broken (Pickin' Up the Pieces)	Jelly Roll	
"R.I.P."	2026	Decades	Motionless in White	

== Songwriting and production credits ==
List of production (songwriting and arrangement) and sole songwriting credits (excluding guest appearances, interpolations, and samples)
Title	Year	Album	Artist(s)	Credit(s)
"Done With Like"	2005	Finally Out of P.E.	Brie Larson	Co-writer
"She Said"	2005	Finally Out of P.E.	Brie Larson	Co-writer
"Love the Way You Lie"	2010	Recovery	Eminem, Rihanna	Co-writer
"Love the Way You Lie (Part II)"	2010	Loud	Rihanna, Eminem	Co-writer
"Love the Way You Lie (Part II)" (Piano Version)	2010	Loud	Rihanna	Co-writer
"Castle Walls"	2010	No Mercy	T.I., Christina Aguilera	Co-writer
"Clarity"	2012	Clarity	Zedd, Foxes	Co-writer
"Only You"	2014	Girl Power	CeeLo Green	Writer
"Gangsta"	2016	Suicide Squad: The Album	Kehlani	Co-writer
"Good Life"	2017	The Fate of the Furious	Kehlani, G-Eazy	Co-writer
"Walk on Water"	2017	Revival	Eminem, Beyoncé	Co-writer, co-producer
"Like Home"	2017	Revival	Eminem, Alicia Keys	Co-writer
"Need Me"	2017	Revival	Eminem, P!nk	Co-writer
"Pick Me Up"	2017	The Beautiful & Damned	G-Eazy, Anna of the North	Co-writer
"Right Now"	2018	Non-album single	Nick Jonas, Robin Schulz	Co-writer
"Beauty Marks"	2019	Beauty Marks	Ciara	Co-writer, co-producer
"Falling In Love Again"	2019	Courage	Céline Dion	Writer
"Let It Out"	2019	Non-album single	Elliott Taylor	Producer
"Leaving Heaven"	2020	Music to Be Murdered By	Eminem	Co-writer, co-producer

== Music videos ==
=== As lead artist ===
Title	Year	Director(s)
"Haunted"	2009	Christian Hand
"Dance Without You"	2011	P.R. Brown
"Invisible"	2011	Jay Martin
"C'mon Let Me Ride"	2012	Isaac Rentz
"Final Warning"	2013	Brewer
"Wear Me Out"	2013	Isaac Rentz
"White Suburban"	2013	Unknown
"Back from the Dead"	2013	David Rosenbaum
"Get Lucky"	2013	Declan Whitebloom
"Coming Home, Pt. II"	2014	Peter Harding
"I Know You"	2015	Unknown
"Cannonball"	2015	Daniel Carberry
"Moving Mountains"	2016	Peter Harding
"Off Road"	2016	Skylar Grey, Ivan Rodrigues, Tyler Shields
"Come Up For Air"	2016	Daniel Carberry
"Lemonade"	2016	Daniel Carberry
"Stand By Me"	2018	Daniel Carberry
"Angel With Tattoos"	2019	Peter Harding
"Runaway Train" (Jamie N Commons with Skylar Grey featuring Gallant)	2019	National Center for Missing & Exploited Children
"Dark Thoughts"	2020	Self-directed
"Sunscreen"	2020	Unknown
"Claws" (with Elliott Taylor)	2020	Unknown
"Fucking Crazy"	2020	Ryan McKinnon
"Sideways"	2020	Unknown
"The Devil Made Me Do It" featuring B.o.B	2020	Ryan McKinnon
"Make It Through The Day"	2020	Ryan McKinnon
"Partly Cloudy With A Chance Of Tears"	2021	Unknown
"Falling Apart"	2022	Ryan McKinnon
"Show Me Where It Hurts"	2022	Elliott Taylor
"Runaway"	2022	Ryan McKinnon
"Vampire At The Swimming Pool"	2022	Jay R. Weneta

=== As featured artist ===
Title	Year	Director(s)
"Where'd You Go" (Fort Minor featuring Holly Brook and Jonah Matranga)	2006	Philip Andelman
"Room for Happiness" (Kaskade featuring Skylar Grey)	2011	Guy Logan
"I Need a Doctor" (Dr. Dre featuring Eminem and Skylar Grey)	2011	Allen Hughes
"Beneath With Me" (Kaskade and deadmau5 featuring Skylar Grey)	2016	Daniel Carberry
"Periscope" (Papa Roach featuring Skylar Grey)	2017	The Uprising Creative
"Numb" (Tommee Profitt X Skylar Grey)	2024	—N/a
