= Fifty Shades of Grey Remixed =

Remix album by various artists
- Released: May 4, 2015
- Length: 37:51
- Label: Republic
- Producers: Various: Emile Haynie; Stephan Moccio; Jason "DaHeala" Quenneville; Dave Okumu; Max Martin; Ali Payami; Oliver Kraus; Aaron Bruno; Dave Cavanaugh; Barney Freeman; Ben Vella; Blythe Pepino; Mike Dean; Dan Heath; Danny Elfman; Dana Sano

Fifty Shades of Grey Remixed is the remix album that accompanied the 2015 film Fifty Shades of Grey. It was released through Republic Records on May 4, 2015, and featured remixes of popular songs, produced by Marian Hill, Gazzo, Oliver Kraus, Brian West, Robotaki, Kaskade, Hippie Sabotage and Sohn amongst others.

== Background ==
The 10-track album accompanied downtempo electronic produced mixes of few popular songs from the soundtrack. This includes two of the successful tracks—the Weeknd's "Earned It (Fifty Shades of Grey)" (remixed by Marian Hill) and Ellie Goulding's "Love Me like You Do" (remixed by Gazzo). Other songs which were produced by remix artists and DJ's are Sia's "Salted Wound" remixed by Oliver Kraus and Brian West, Skylar Grey's "I Know You" by Kaskade. Some tracks which were not remixed for the album, were Beyoncé's own remix of "Crazy in Love", Annie Lennox's version of Screamin' Jay Hawkins' 1956 single "I Put a Spell on You" amongst others.

In February 2019, the remix album was included in a 4-CD deluxe edition box set that accompanied the soundtracks of the first three Fifty Shades films.

== Commercial performance ==
The album debuted at number 3 on the Billboard Top Dance/Electronic Albums chart, selling around 2,000 units.

== Track listing ==
No.	Title	Writer(s)	Producer(s)	Length
1.	"Undiscovered" (Praia remix) (performed by Laura Welsh)	Emile Haynie; Dev Hynes; Laura Welsh; Amanda Ghost	Haynie	2:53
2.	"Earned It (Fifty Shades of Grey)" (Marian Hill remix) (performed by the Weeknd)	Abel Tesfaye; Stephan Moccio; Jason "DaHeala" Quenneville; Ahmad Balshe	Moccio; Quenneville	4:10
3.	"Meet Me in the Middle" (CANVAS remix) (performed by Jessie Ware)	Dave Okumu; Jessie Ware; Aaron Ward	Okumu	5:08
4.	"Love Me like You Do" (Gazzo remix) (performed by Ellie Goulding)	Max Martin; Savan Kotecha; Ilya Salmanzadeh; Ali Payami; Tove Nilsson	Martin; Payami	4:10
5.	"Salted Wound" (Oliver Kraus and Brian West remix) (performed by Sia)	West; Gerald Eaton; Sia Furler; Oliver Kraus	Kraus	4:30
6.	"I'm on Fire" (Robotaki remix) (performed by Awolnation)	Bruce Springsteen	Aaron Bruno	2:34
7.	"One Last Night" (Hippie Sabotage remix) (performed by Vaults)	Barnabas Freeman; Benjamin Vella; Blythe Pepino	Barney Freeman; Ben Vella; Pepino	3:19
8.	"Where You Belong" (SOHN remix) (performed by the Weeknd)	Tesfaye; Mike Dean; Balshe	Dean	4:57
9.	"I Know You" (Kaskade remix) (performed by Skylar Grey)	Moccio; Skylar Grey	Dan Heath; Moccio	4:58
10.	"Ana and Christian" (Heavy Mellow remix) (performed by Danny Elfman)	Danny Elfman	Danny Elfman	3:24
Total length:				37:51

== Chart performance ==
Chart (2014)	Peak position
US Top Dance/Electronic Albums (Billboard)	3

== See also ==
- Fifty Shades of Grey (soundtrack)
