= Natural Causes (Skylar Grey album) =

Studio album by Skylar Grey
- Released: September 23, 2016
- Genre: Indie pop
- Length: 49:34
- Label: KidinaKorner; Interscope
- Producer: Alex da Kid; Eminem; Dan Heath; Epikh Pro; Jayson DeZuzio; Luis Resto; Mark Batson; Mike Elizondo; Skylar Grey; Symbolyc One; VohnBeatz

Skylar Grey chronology
| Don't Look Down (2013) | Natural Causes (2016) | Skylar Grey (2022) |

Singles from Natural Causes
- 1. "Moving Mountains" Released: March 31, 2016; 2. "Off Road" Released: July 21, 2016; 3. "Come Up for Air" Released: September 2, 2016; 4. "Lemonade" Released: September 16, 2016

Natural Causes is the third studio album by American recording artist Skylar Grey. It is her second album since her stage name change from Holly Brook to Skylar Grey. It was released on September 23, 2016, by KidinaKorner and Interscope Records.

== Background ==
In early 2015, Grey announced that she was working on a third studio album, which was due to come out in 2015. Grey later attempted to promote the album by joining American band X Ambassadors on their VHS Tour. She later revealed the release date would be on September 23, 2016. Grey additionally claimed that she refused to have any guest features on the album, but eventually gave in when her former "Love the Way You Lie" collaborator Eminem offered to be on the album. He additionally produced "Come Up for Air". The album finds Grey collaborating with various prominent producers, including Alex da Kid, Mike Elizondo, Mark Batson, and Symbolyc One.

== Promotion and singles ==
Grey released the song "Cannonball", featuring American rock band X Ambassadors as the first buzz single from the album on March 31, 2016. The single was later revealed to have been removed from the track list after "Moving Mountains" was declared the first and lead single of the album. The official music video for "Moving Mountains" was released on Vevo the same day. The video was directed by Peter Harding Song and inspired by her home in Utah. The second single from the album, "Off Road", was released on July 22, 2016. The music video for the song was released on the same day in sponsorship with Samsung Gear 360. On September 2, 2016, Grey released the third single "Come Up for Air", which was produced by rapper Eminem. The fourth and last single released on the album, "Lemonade", was released on September 16, 2016. On September 22, 2016 Grey streamed a song on her album titled "Kill For You", which features Eminem, on Rolling Stone. To promote the album, she went on a 12-city tour.

== Critical reception ==
Professional ratings
Review scores
| Source | Rating |
|---|---|
| AllMusic | 4/5 stars |
| Edge Media Network | (positive) |
| Conor Clark | 5/5 stars |
| Milwaukee Journal Sentinel | (positive) |
| Renowned for Sound | 5/5 stars |
| Immortal Reviews | 75/100 |
| BensBeat | 7/10 |
| Artistically Trustworthy | 4/5 stars |
| Peauxetic Expressions | (positive) |
| KnoxNews | 3/5 stars |

The album was met with critical acclaim and received rave reviews, Michael Smith of Renowned for Sound gave the album 5 stars out of 5, and called it a "masterpiece", writing "In terms of setting the mood, the album's first full song Jump does this perfectly. The song makes perfect use of its sparse arrangement, revolving around a very minimal beat and hand clap combo backed by a repeating guitar line that moves the song forward as Grey sings over the top. [...] Skylar Grey has hands down created her best material yet on Natural Causes, and created a veritable masterpiece that will be remembered long after 2016 is behind us."

Neil Z. Yeung of AllMusic gave the album 4 out of 5 stars, writing, "From the misty intro, "Wilderness," which turns the dial to an Auto-Tuned Bon Iver frequency, to the warm acoustic strum of the KT Tunstall-meets-Radiohead 'Moving Mountains', Natural Causes capitalizes on atmosphere and mood, opting to skip the scattered production of Don't Look Down and focus on earnestness and vulnerability."

Alexis Arnold of Indie Band Guru heavily praised the album, writing "It [the album] creates this weird atmosphere that Grey herself rules. She works with a lot of different tones and sounds while still sounding like effortless perfection. It brings the transparency and rawness that’s missing from pop these days while also having a backbone. [...] Skylar Grey is creating a new sound and, in short, it’s impossible to ignore."

== Track listing ==
| No. | Title | Writer(s) | Producer(s) | Length |
|---|---|---|---|---|
| 1. | "Intro – Wilderness" | Holly Hafermann; Labrinth | Hafermann | 1:34 |
| 2. | "Jump" | Hafermann; Mark Batson; Mike Elizondo | Mark Batson; Elizondo | 4:28 |
| 3. | "Lemonade" | Hafermann; Larry Griffin Jr.; Alex da Kid; Javohn Griffin; Stuart Lowery | Alex da Kid; S1; Epikh Pro^{[a]}; Vohn Beatz^{[a]} | 3:53 |
| 4. | "Kill for You" (featuring Eminem) | Hafermann; Marshall Mathers; Mark Batson; Elizondo | Eminem; Mark Batson^{[a]}; Elizondo^{[a]} | 4:51 |
| 5. | "Come Up for Air" | Hafermann; Mathers; Luis Resto | Eminem; Resto^{[a]} | 4:20 |
| 6. | "Real World" | Hafermann; Alex da Kid; Micah Powell | Alex da Kid | 4:02 |
| 7. | "Straight Shooter" | Hafermann; Jayson DeZuzio | DeZuzio | 2:58 |
| 8. | "Off Road" | Hafermann; DeZuzio | DeZuzio | 3:17 |
| 9. | "In My Garden" | Hafermann; Elizondo | Elizondo; Hafermann^{[a]} | 3:15 |
| 10. | "Moving Mountains" | Hafermann; Mark Batson; Elizondo | Mark Batson; Elizondo | 4:13 |
| 11. | "Picture Perfect" | Hafermann; L. Griffin Jr.; J. Griffin; Lowery | S1; Epikh Pro^{[a]}; Vohn Beatz^{[a]} | 4:35 |
| 12. | "We Used to Be Bad" | Hafermann; Alex da Kid; DeZuzio | Alex da Kid; DeZuzio | 4:10 |
| 13. | "Closer" | Hafermann | Hafermann; Dan Heath^{[b]} | 3:47 |
| Total length: | | | | 49:34 |

Notes

- ^{^[a]} signifies an additional producer
- ^{^[b]} signifies a co-producer

== Personnel ==
Musicians

- Skylar Grey – vocals

Additional musicians

- Eminem – vocals (track 4)

Additional personnel

- Alex da Kid – executive production
- Eminem – executive production
- Mark Batson – production
- Jayson DeZuzio – production, composition
- Larry Griffin Jr. – production
- Skylar Grey – production, composition
- J. Griffin – production
- Epikh Pro – production
- Mike Elizondo – production
- Luis Resto – production

== Charts ==
| Chart (2016) | Peak position |
|---|---|
| Belgian Albums (Ultratop Flanders) | 193 |
| Canadian Albums (Billboard) | 68 |
| French Albums (SNEP) | 115 |
