= Castle Walls =

Song by T.I. featuring Christina Aguilera

from the album No Mercy
- Recorded: 2010
- Studio: Silent Sound Studios (Atlanta, GA); Conway Recording Studios (Los Angeles, CA)
- Genre: Hip hop; electro
- Length: 5:29
- Label: Grand Hustle; Atlantic
- Songwriters: Clifford Harris; Holly Hafferman; Alexander Grant
- Producer: Alex da Kid

Licensed audio
- "Castle Walls (feat. Christina Aguilera)" on YouTube

"Castle Walls" is a song by American rapper T.I. featuring American singer Christina Aguilera, from the former's seventh studio album No Mercy (2010). Alex da Kid produced the song and co-wrote it along with Skylar Grey and T.I. The song was initially produced for Diddy's album Last Train to Paris, but Diddy felt that "Castle Walls" would be better suited to T.I.; Aguilera was later chosen as the featured artist on the song. A hip hop and electro number, "Castle Walls" received mixed response from music critics, some of whom picked it as a highlight from No Mercy, and some others criticized the song's lyrics. Despite not being released as a single, the track still managed to appear on record charts of several nations, including on the US Bubbling Under Hot 100 Singles, where it peaked at number five.

== Background ==
Originally, "Castle Walls" belonged to Diddy, who had commissioned the song for his fifth album Last Train to Paris with his group Dirty Money. But Diddy told T.I., "Yeah, this is my record, but you know what, I think this is a better fit for you. I think you should rock out on this one. I think this speaks volumes to where you are, what you going through, what you living and how you feel." Consequently, Christina Aguilera was chosen as the featured guest on the song, which appeared on T.I.'s album No Mercy. Alex da Kid, producer of the song, said about the collaboration, "I love it. I think it's amazing. It's my sound, just kind of an evolution of that. I think it'll cater to a lot of different people." T.I. told RapFix Live about the track's inspiration:

I live the life that most would die for, but there's a lot of things that come with this life. People don't take that into consideration. There are a lot of things in this life that I would trade in a minute just for a slice of normalcy [...] I just listed a few things that they probably never viewed from that particular perspective. Because I think people need to see things another way; they need to see it other than just celebrity.

In November 2010, Alex da Kid announced that "Castle Walls" would be released as a single from No Mercy. However, the song was not released. A 30-second snippet of the song featuring Aguilera's part was released onto YouTube later that month.

== Composition ==
"Castle Walls" lasts for a duration of 5:29 (five minutes and twenty nine seconds) and is a hip hop and electro song. The song features a Europop keyboard in its arrangement. Nathan Rabin from The A.V. Club wrote that the lyrics of "Castle Walls" "offer similarly incisive and only occasionally self-pitying commentary on the tragedy and triumph of being young, black, rich, famous, and a repeat felon." The song begins with the chorus, in which Aguilera sings, "Everyone thinks that I have it all / But it's so empty living behind these castle walls (These castle walls) / If I should tumble if I should fall/ Would anyone hear me screaming behind these castle walls? / There's no one here at all, behind these castle walls." After the chorus, T.I. raps the verse "See with the Phantoms and Ferraris in the driveway / But you see it came in exchange of a sane man's sanity / Your vision jaded by the Grammys on the mantlepiece / Just switch your camera lenses, you will see the agony" over a "warbling" electronic background and hip hop beats. Towards the song's conclusion, there is a "sad" string arrangement and an electronica-influenced "triumphantly striding beat." An editor from HipHopDX compared "Castle Walls" to "Love the Way You Lie" by Eminem featuring Rihanna, which was also produced by da Kid.

== Reception ==
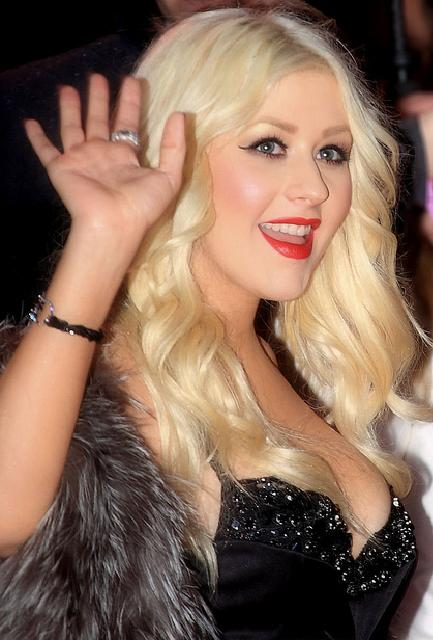
Christina Aguilera (pictured in 2010) was featured on "Castle Walls"

"Castle Walls" received mixed reviews from music critics. Becky Bain from Idolator called "Castle Walls" a "bright spot" for both T.I. and Aguilera "after the not-so-great years both artists have had." Steve Jones, an editor from USA Today, praised Aguilera's appearance on the track and picked it as one of the highlights on No Mercy. Likewise, Slava Kupersein of HipHopDX and The Boston Globe's Ken Capobianco labelled "Castle Walls" a standout from No Mercy and applauded Aguilera's vocals. Chase McMullen from One Thirty BPM thought that the song "epitomizes the album nearly perfectly", but opined that Justin Timberlake should be the guest vocalist rather than Aguilera. Leah Greenblatt of Entertainment Weekly simply deemed the track "mournful, lonely" and described the chorus on the song as "melancholy".

David Amidon writing for PopMatters wrote a mixed review, calling "Castle Walls" "heartfelt [...] but it also feels like a hip-hop version of late-period Phil Collins, a sort of end so inoffensive and far removed from the life force of hip-hop as to appear a sick joke." Critic Jody Rosen from Rolling Stone was displeased with the lyrics of the song, deeming it "an icky bit of self-pity from a rich and famous man." Sean Fennessey of The Washington Post named it an "unfortunately regal perspective", while Pitchfork Media's Tom Breihan called it "downright insulting." Prefix Magazine's Dave Park described "Castle Walls" as "cloying" and opined that the track bore an "embarrassing resemblance" to Britney Spears' song "Lucky" (2001).

Despite not being released as an official single, "Castle Walls" still managed to enter the record charts of several countries. The track was a success in South Korea, where it debuted at number six on the Gaon International Singles Chart during the week of 5 December 2010. In the United States, the song reached number five on the Bubbling Under Hot 100 Singles chart and number 84 on the Hot R&B/Hip-Hop Songs. On the Canadian Hot 100 chart, it peaked at number 99. "Castle Walls" also entered the charts of three European countries: number 27 in Czech Republic, number 31 in Slovakia, and number 51 in Sweden.

== Music video ==
A music video for "Castle Walls" was filmed in the Fall of 2010 before T.I. was sentenced to eleven months in prison, but was ultimately scrapped and remains unreleased. An exclusive sneak peek was uploaded to the rapper's YouTube channel in late November 2010.

== Usage in media ==
In the sixth season of T.I. & Tiny: The Family Hustle the song was used in the final episode titled "100", in a crucial scene featuring T.I.

== Charts ==
=== Weekly charts ===
Chart (2010–11)	Peak position
Canada Hot 100 (Billboard)	99
CIS Airplay (TopHit)	11
Czech Republic Airplay (ČNS IFPI)	27
German Black Chart	16
Poland (Polish Airplay New)	5
Russia Airplay (TopHit)	12
Slovakia (IFPI)	31
South Korea (Gaon International Singles Chart)	6
Sweden (Sverigetopplistan)	51
Ukraine Airplay (TopHit)	43
US Bubbling Under Hot 100 Singles (Billboard)	5
US Hot R&B/Hip-Hop Songs (Billboard)	84
US Rap Digital Song Sales (Billboard)	17

=== Year-end charts ===
Chart (2011)	Position
Lebanon (NRJ)	23
Russia Airplay (TopHit)	38
Ukraine Airplay (TopHit)	98
