= Invisible (Skylar Grey song) =

2011 single by Skylar Grey

Single by Skylar Grey
- Released: August 9, 2011
- Genre: R&B; trip hop; hip hop
- Length: 4:12
- Label: Interscope
- Songwriters: Skylar Grey; Alexander Grant; Rob Thomas
- Producer: Alex da Kid

Skylar Grey singles chronology
"Invisible" (2011)	"Dance Without You" (2011)

Music video
- "Invisible" on YouTube

"Invisible" is the debut single by American recording artist Skylar Grey. It was officially first released on iTunes on August 9, 2011. She performed the track along with various other songs on her upcoming studio album at The Glass House on July 31, 2011, and the song earned placement in the official trailer for the Madonna-directed film W./E..

== Background ==
"Before I started writing this album, I felt like I had lost control of my life and didn’t know who I was anymore. I needed to ground myself so I decided to spend some time in solitude, and in the process discovered my inner super hero. The album tells that story starting with ‘Invisible’, which is how I used to feel."

— Skylar Grey talking to Digital Spy about "Invisible's placement on Invinsible.

"Invisible" was written solely by Grey and produced by Alex da Kid. Following the underperformance of Grey's debut studio album Like Blood Like Honey (2006), Grey spent time in solitude to figure out what she wanted to do with life. Grey continued to write music and feature on other songs, such as "Where'd You Go" and "Coming Home", before returning to performing as a solo artist. "Invisible", "Dance Without You" and "Building a Monster" were all recorded for an intended album named Invinsible, with the former two being released as singles. However, the album was shortly shelved leaving the two songs as standalone singles. When speaking to Billboard about the song's meaning, Grey commented:

It's the very beginning of the story that I'm telling on this album, so chronologically, it makes sense to release that part of my story first. I was depressed and broke and had nobody around and was feeling invisible to the world. That's what that song's about, that very first step... and so, within the album, you go on that journey of how I became invincible, and i think it's gonna be a story that a lot of people can relate to.

== Critical reception ==
Popcrush rated the song a four out of five stars and commented positively on the song's emotion and feel by saying "her song is an ode to feeling alone in a crowded room and feeling like no one can see the real you. The song addresses the notion of image, and the battle between the real you vs. the you that people see. It's weighty subject matter encased in a pop song, with the lyrics surrounded by beats are light and airy." Billboard positively received the track and called it a "gorgeous, vulnerable opening statement that stretches her talent for crafting quick melodies over a fully formed pop track. "Invisible" sheds light on Skylar's own compelling persona."

== Chart performance ==
In the United States, "Invisible" peaked at number 10 on the Dance Club Songs chart, spending a total of 13 weeks on the chart.

== Music video ==
The official video for "Invisible" was released to YouTube on September 8, 2011. The video depicts Grey in various scenes ranging from on top of a skyscraper to in the middle of a busy street. The video has reached over three million views currently while only being accessible for one week. When asked about the video, Grey replied by saying “I wanted it to be Peter Parker by day meets Spiderman by night. An everyday kid, who isn't really that cool but there's something else going on, that people don't know about, That's kind of the journey that I went on. I discovered that my insecurities and my flaws were things that I actually need to embrace, and I let them become my superpowers.”

=== Critical reception ===
Idolator commented on the video by saying that it was very dramatic and said that the video "isn't your usual “Firework”/“Who Says” feel-good video." HitFix said that "Songwriter Skylar Grey's Interscope debut is titled “Invisible,” and so it is in more ways than one. Superheroes, for one, have exhibited such a superpowers [sic]. Grey shows off her Spider-man side in the newly minted music video for the album's title track."

== Track listings and formats ==
- Digital download
1. "Invisible" – 4:12
- Digital download (Remixes)
1. "Invisible" (Dirty South Remix) – 6:21
2. "Invisible" (Whiiite & Flinch Remix) – 5:07
3. "Invisible" (John Dahlback Remix) – 5:55
4. "Invisible" (Kaskade Remix) – 7:00
5. "Invisible" (Mihell & Pinkfinger Remix) – 7:01
6. "Invisible" (Fred Falke Remix) – 3:48
7. "Invisible" (David Lynch Remix) – 4:18

== Charts ==
"Invisible" entered the Billboard Dance/Club Play Songs chart on the week of October 1, 2011, making it her first song to chart on any Billboard chart as a lead artist.

Chart (2011)	Peak position
Germany (Media Control AG)	86
UK Singles (Official Charts)	63
US Dance/Club Play Songs (Billboard)	10
