= Aquaman (soundtrack) =

Aquaman: Original Motion Picture Soundtrack

Soundtrack album by Rupert Gregson-Williams
- Released: December 14, 2018
- Recorded: 2018
- Length: 65:02; 100:45 (Deluxe)
- Label: WaterTower
- Producer: Rupert Gregson-Williams

Rupert Gregson-Williams chronology
Terminal (2018)	Aquaman: Original Motion Picture Soundtrack (2018)	Murder Mystery (2019)

Singles from Aquaman
- 1. "Everything I Need" Released: December 14, 2018; 2. "Ocean to Ocean" Released: December 14, 2018

Aquaman: Original Motion Picture Soundtrack is the soundtrack to the film of the same name. The music is composed and arranged by Rupert Gregson-Williams. It was released on December 14, 2018, by WaterTower Music. A deluxe edition containing 11 bonus tracks was released on July 19, 2019.

The album features two original songs, the first by American musician Skylar Grey entitled "Everything I Need", written by Grey and Elliott Taylor, the second by American rapper Pitbull featuring Rhea titled "Ocean to Ocean", written by Pitbull, George Bechara, Bianca Oechsle and Gabriel Dunn, this song samples Toto's "Africa" (1982), written by Jeff Porcaro and David Paich also being credited as songwriters, both featured on the soundtrack and was released on the same day with the score album.

The score received generally positive reactions, who praised its thematic elements and use of synth, positively comparing it to Mark Mothersbaugh's score for Thor: Ragnarok.

== Background ==
Rupert Gregson-Williams was the composer for Aquaman. Gregson-Williams previously wrote the score for Wonder Woman, the fourth film in the DC Extended Universe. In an interview with The Hollywood Reporter, Gregson-Williams stated that Aquaman was his most ambitious film to date. First discussions with director James Wan prompted Gregson-Williams to start writing the score even before he was even hired. The basis of the score started with a theme for Arthur's parents, Queen Atlanna and Thomas Curry which served as the cornerstone for the love story between them in the film. From there, he mapped out different character themes for Black Manta which uses a mixture of synths and beats, and the film's primary villain, Ocean Master which Gregson-Williams describes as a "non-melodic theme, but you have to be worried about this guy".

The score was recorded at the Eastwood scoring stage located at Warner Bros. Studios, Burbank with the Hollywood Studio Symphony with Alastair King and Nick Glennie-Smith serving as conductors. Andrew Kawczynski, Evan Jolly, Forest Christenson, Tom Clarke and Steve Mazzaro provided additional music. The choir section was recorded at Air Lyndhurst Studios with the London Voices choral ensemble. Roy Orbison's song She's a Mystery to Me was also featured in the film.

== Track listing ==
All music is composed by Rupert Gregson-Williams, except where noted.

No.	Title	Artist(s)	Length
1.	"Everything I Need" (Film version)	Skylar Grey	3:16
2.	"Arthur"		4:40
3.	"Kingdom of Atlantis"		3:26
4.	"It Wasn't Meant to Be"		3:22
5.	"Atlantean Soldiers"		3:35
6.	"What Does That Even Mean?"		3:23
7.	"The Legend of Atlan"		1:57
8.	"Swimming Lessons"		3:03
9.	"The Black Manta"		2:49
10.	"What Could Be Greater Than a King?"		5:23
11.	"Permission to Come Aboard"		2:16
12.	"Suited and Booted"		4:25
13.	"Between Land and Sea"		2:55
14.	"He Commands the Sea"		3:34
15.	"Map in a Bottle"		2:15
16.	"The Ring of Fire"		4:57
17.	"Reunited"		1:31
18.	"Everything I Need"	Skylar Grey	3:20
19.	"Ocean to Ocean"	Pitbull featuring Rhea	2:25
20.	"Trench Engaged" (from Kingdom of the Trench)	Joseph Bishara	2:29
Total length:			65:02

Aquaman (Original Motion Picture Soundtrack) — Deluxe edition
No.	Title	Artist(s)	Length
1.	"Mera Montage"		2:05
2.	"Home Invasion"		2:49
3.	"Saving Pops"		3:04
4.	"Ahab Waves"		1:30
5.	"Ask the Sea"		2:00
6.	"Obligation"		1:25
7.	"Dunes"		2:05
8.	"Suited & Booted"	Our Empire	3:57
9.	"The Black Manta" (feat. Jim Davies)	Future Funk Squad	5:11
10.	"Atlantean Soldiers" (March in Formation Remix)	Glen Nicholls	5:00
11.	"Kingdom of Atlantis" (Escape to Atlantis Remix)	Glen Nicholls	6:37
Total length:			35:43

== Charts ==
Chart (2019)	Peak position
France Singles Top 100 (SNEP)	96
New Zealand Hot 40 Singles (RMNZ)	28
