= Last One Standing (Skylar Grey, Polo G, Mozzy, and Eminem song) =

2021 single by Skylar Grey

Single by Skylar Grey, Polo G, Mozzy and Eminem
- Released: September 30, 2021
- Length: 4:17
- Label: Shady; Interscope
- Songwriters: Holly Hafermann; Taurus Bartlett; Timothy Patterson; Marshall Mathers; Justin Franks; Daniel Majic; James LaVigne
- Producers: DJ Frank E; Danny Majic

Skylar Grey singles chronology
"Partly Cloudy with a Chance of Tears" (2021)	"Last One Standing" (2021)	"Vampire at the Swimming Pool" (2021)

Polo G singles chronology
"Better Days" (2021)	"Last One Standing" / "Want It All" (2021)	"Jumpin" (2021)

Mozzy singles chronology
"Unforgiven" (2021)	"Last One Standing" (2021)	"The Ave" (2021)

Eminem singles chronology
"The Adventures of Moon Man & Slim Shady" (2020)	"Last One Standing" (2021)	"The King & I" (2022)

"Last One Standing" is a song by American singer Skylar Grey and American rappers Polo G, Mozzy, and Eminem. The song was made for the 2021 film Venom: Let There Be Carnage. The song was released on September 30, 2021, the day before the release of the film. It debuted at number 78 on the US Billboard Hot 100, making it Skylar Grey's first entry on the chart as a lead artist and Mozzy's first overall entry on the chart. The accompanying lyric video to the song is presented as a duet between Venom and his offspring Carnage, discussing their respective hosts, Eddie Brock and Cletus Kasady.

In the single, there is also a remix of Eminem's song "Venom" from his album Kamikaze, which was the titular theme for the previous film.

== Track listing ==
Formats and track listings of major single releases of "Last One Standing" are as follows:

Digital single (1 track version) from iTunes

No.	Title	Writer(s)	Producer(s)	Length
1.	"Last One Standing"	Holly Hafermann; Taurus Bartlett; Timothy Patterson; Marshall Mathers; Justin Franks; Daniel Majic; James LaVigne	DJ Frank E; Danny Majic	4:17

Digital single (2 track version) from iTunes

No.	Title	Writer(s)	Producer(s)	Length
1.	"Last One Standing (From Venom: Let There Be Carnage)"	Holly Hafermann; Taurus Bartlett; Timothy Patterson; Marshall Mathers; Justin Franks; Daniel Majic; James LaVigne	DJ Frank E; Danny Majic	4:18
2.	"Venom (Remix)"	Marshall Mathers; D.A. Got That Dope	D.A. Got That Dope	4:21
Total length:				8:39

== Charts ==
Chart performance for "Last One Standing"
Chart (2021)	Peak position
Australia (ARIA)	70
Canada Hot 100 (Billboard)	38
Czech Republic Singles Digital (ČNS IFPI)	65
Germany (GfK)	84
Global 200 (Billboard)	53
Greece (IFPI)	96
Ireland (IRMA)	47
New Zealand Hot Singles (RMNZ)	2
Norway (VG-lista)	26
Slovakia (Singles Digitál Top 100)	59
Sweden (Sverigetopplistan)	68
Switzerland (Schweizer Hitparade)	48
UK Singles (Official Charts)	46
UK Hip Hop/R&B (Official Charts)	18
US Billboard Hot 100	78
US Hot R&B/Hip-Hop Songs (Billboard)	31

== Certifications ==
Region	Certification	Certified units/sales
United States (RIAA)	Gold	500,000^{‡}
^{‡} Sales+streaming figures based on certification alone.
