= I Know You (Skylar Grey song) =

Promotional single by Skylar Grey

from the album Fifty Shades of Grey: Original Motion Picture Soundtrack
- Released: February 3, 2015
- Recorded: 2014
- Genre: Synthpop
- Length: 4:58
- Label: Interscope; KIDinaKORNER
- Songwriter(s): Holly Hafermann; Stephan Moccio
- Producer(s): Stephan Moccio; Dan Heath

"I Know You" is a song recorded by American recording artist and songwriter Skylar Grey for the soundtrack to the film Fifty Shades of Grey (2015). The song was written by Grey and Canadian composer/producer Stephan Moccio and was co-produced by Moccio and Dan Heath. It was released as the second promotional single from the Fifty Shades of Grey soundtrack on February 3, 2015.

== Critical reception ==
"I Know You" received acclaim from music critics. Bianca Gracie from Idolator called the song "a beautiful ballad with soaring strings and luxurious-sounding percussion". Carolyn Menyes from Music Times called the song "emotional" describing "I Know You" as "a mid-tempo piano ballad with a pulsing beat, yearning lyrics and dripping, high vocals". Hayley Spencer from InStyle wrote "[the song] is a haunting piano ballad about convincing your lover to let go of the past and fully commit". Nolan Feeney of Time called the song "moody, though somewhat less depressing" saying that the song lyrics resemble things Anastasia Steele (Dakota Johnson) probably whispers longingly to Christian Grey (Jamie Dornan) when they aren't exploring their kinky sides.

Eliza Thompson from Cosmopolitan described the song as "a slow, piano-based ballad about convincing your lover to let go of his past and just be chill". In a non-favorable review, Kenneth Partridge for Billboard said the song is "fairly lackluster" for a "torch song". Emilee Lindner of MTV stated "Grey sings sweetly and achingly for her lover to fully commit, telling him “I know you, baby.” It's as if they've been through it all before and she just wants to be in love without complications".

== Commercial performance ==
In its day of release, "I Know You" reached the top spot on the American, Canadian and Mexican iTunes charts. The following day, the song reached the top in 10 countries other including France, Portugal and Poland. "I Know You" debuted at No. 45 on Portugal Singles Chart on the week of February 6 climbing to number 24 on the following week. On the week of February 20, the song fell to number 30. "I Know You" debuted at number 12 on the Billboard Bubbling Under Hot 100 charts and then rose to number 11 the following week. On the Canadian Hot 100 charts, the song debuted and peaked at number 80. The song has since received over 65 million streams on Spotify.

== Music video ==
An official lyric video for the song premiered on YouTube and VEVO on the same day the track was released. The lyric video has since received over 108 million views on YouTube. On February 10, Skylar confirmed that there would be a release of a visual music video for the song as she posted a picture from the set on her Instagram account. The music video was released exclusively on the unrated edition of the Fifty Shades of Grey Blu-ray release on May 8.

== Charts ==
Chart (2015)	Peak position
Canada (Canadian Hot 100)	80
Czech Republic (Singles Digitál Top 100)	81
France (SNEP)	71
Portugal (AFP)	24
Slovakia (Singles Digitál Top 100)	54
Sweden Heatseeker (Sverigetopplistan)	2
UK Singles (Official Charts Company)	127
US Bubbling Under Hot 100 Singles (Billboard)	11
US Pop Digital Songs (Billboard)	34

== Certifications ==
Region	Certification	Certified units/sales
Poland (ZPAV)	Platinum	20,000^{‡}
^{‡} Sales+streaming figures based on certification alone.
