= Skylar Grey =

American singer (born 1986)

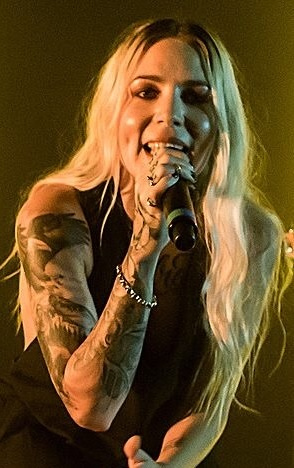
- Grey performing in 2016

Background information
- Also known as: Holly Brook
- Born: Holly Brook Hafermann; February 23, 1986 (age 40); Mazomanie, Wisconsin, U.S.
- Genres: Pop; hip-hop
- Occupations: Singer; songwriter; record producer
- Instruments: Vocals; piano; guitar
- Works: Skylar Grey discography
- Years active: 2004–present
- Labels: Kidinakorner; Interscope; Machine Shop; Warner Bros.
- Spouse: Todd Mandell (m. 2013; div. 2022)
- Website: skylargreymusic.com

Holly Brook Hafermann (born February 23, 1986), known professionally as Skylar Grey, is an American singer, songwriter, and record producer. In 2004, Grey signed a publishing deal with Universal Music Publishing Group and a recording contract with Linkin Park's Machine Shop Recordings under the name Holly Brook. Her debut studio album, Like Blood Like Honey (2006), served as her only release with the label.

In 2010, Grey co-wrote Eminem's hit single "Love the Way You Lie" with English producer Alex da Kid, who signed Grey to his record label Kidinakorner, an imprint of Interscope Records. Her second album, Don't Look Down (2013) peaked within the top ten of the Billboard 200, while her third, Natural Causes (2016) was met with critical acclaim despite failing to chart. Her 2021 single, "Last One Standing" (with Polo G, Mozzy and Eminem) marked her first entry—at number 78—on the Billboard Hot 100 as a lead artist. The following year, her self-titled fourth album (2022) was released independently to continued acclaim.

Grey is also known for providing guest vocals on several hit singles, such as Fort Minor's "Where'd You Go", Diddy's "Coming Home", Dr. Dre's "I Need a Doctor", Nicki Minaj's "Bed of Lies", Macklemore's "Glorious", and Motionless in White's "R.I.P.". Additionally, she has written songs for a number of prominent performers including Rihanna, Kehlani, G-Eazy, Alicia Keys, Ciara, Christina Aguilera, Zedd, Nick Jonas, Céline Dion, and CeeLo Green.

== Life and career ==
=== 1994–2004: Early life and Generations ===
As a child, Grey performed professionally in a folk duo with her mother, Candace Kreitlow, called Generations. The group released three studio albums together.

=== 2005–2010: Like Blood Like Honey and EPs ===
Grey co-wrote "Done With Like" and "She Said" with Jon Ingoldsby and American actress Brie Larson for Larson's first and only album, Finally Out of P.E. (2005). In 2005, Grey was featured on the song "Where'd You Go" and "Be Somebody" by Fort Minor, a side project by American singer, rapper, and songwriter Mike Shinoda of Linkin Park. "Where'd You Go" was released as a single on April 14, 2006, with an accompanying music video following soon after. The song gained commercial success and ended up becoming a top four hit on the US Billboard Hot 100 chart and also became certified platinum by the Recording Industry Association of America (RIAA). After working with music producer Jonathan Ingoldsby, Grey released her debut album, titled Like Blood Like Honey, on June 6, 2006, under Warner Bros. Records. The album peaked at number 35 on Billboard's Heatseekers Albums chart. During this time, Grey had landed opening spots for concert tours with Jamie Cullum, k.d. lang, Daniel Powter, Teddy Geiger and Duncan Sheik.

Through Machine Shop Records, Grey worked with Linkin Park affiliates Styles of Beyond and Apathy. She was featured on two tracks, "Victim" and "No Sad Tomorrow", from Apathy's second studio album, Wanna Snuggle? (2009). Grey toured as part of Duncan Sheik's band and contributed substantially to his 2009 album, Whisper House. In 2009, Grey sang backing vocals on Eurovision contestant Yohanna's debut album, Butterflies and Elvis. In August 2009, still under the name Holly Brook, she lent both her song "It's Raining Again" and her image to a promotional campaign for Ciao Water. In early 2010, she performed in the theatrical version of "Whisper House," playing one of the two lead ghost vocalists, along with David Poe. On June 10, 2010, she self-released the seven-song extended play (EP), O’Dark:Thirty. Production of the EP was handled by Duncan Sheik and Jon Ingoldsby.

=== 2010–2011: Songwriting and name change ===
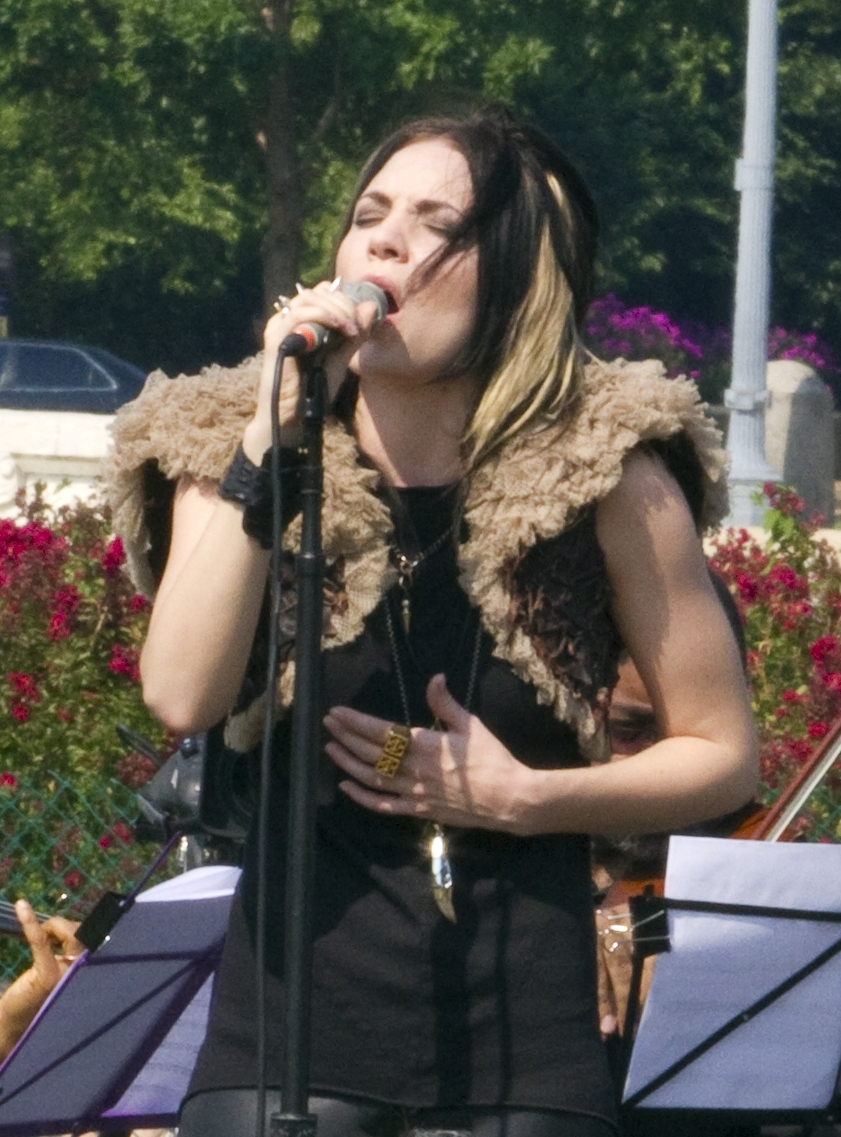
Grey singing at the Tibet Talk for World Peace in July 2011

Brook later changed her stage name to Skylar Grey. While still living in Oregon, Grey visited New York to meet her publisher Jennifer Blakeman, to seek help presenting her work. Blakeman had suggested that she work with English producer Alex da Kid. Alex da Kid then sent Grey a few tracks that he had been working on, the first song finished being "Love the Way You Lie". The song was given to American rapper Eminem (who wrote the verses) and Barbadian singer Rihanna. Their song became a worldwide hit, reaching number one on 26 charts and being nominated for four Grammy Awards. Grey received a Song of the Year Grammy nomination for "Love the Way You Lie". Grey wrote the hook to all three versions of "Love the Way You Lie" by Eminem and Rihanna, and even recorded a solo version that was later featured on her fourth EP, The Buried Sessions of Skylar Grey (2012).

Alex da Kid went on to sign Skylar Grey to a production deal on his KIDinaKORNER record label imprint. In 2010, Grey also co-wrote and was featured on Diddy – Dirty Money's single "Coming Home", which gained massive commercial success. Also in 2010, Grey co-wrote "Castle Walls" by American rapper T.I. and American pop singer Christina Aguilera. On February 1, 2011, American renowned hip-hop producer Dr. Dre released a song titled "I Need a Doctor", featuring Eminem and Grey. "I Need a Doctor" managed to peak at number four on the US Billboard Hot 100 chart and was certified double platinum by the RIAA. The song garnered Grey several Grammy nominations.

Grey made her national television debut under her new alias during the 53rd Annual Grammy Awards, where she performed "I Need a Doctor", with Eminem and Dr. Dre. During this time, Grey announced that she had begun working on her album then-titled Invinsible. In March 2011, it was revealed Grey signed to Interscope Records, through Alex da Kid's KIDinaKORNER and announced she would be releasing a single in the spring. Later in 2011, Grey was featured on a song titled "Words I Never Said", the second single from Lupe Fiasco's Lasers (2011).

Grey released her debut single, "Dance Without You", on June 6, 2011. The song later received a music video, which was released on July 5. Grey's second single and formerly her second album's title-track, "Invisible", was released to radio on June 16. Grey performed alongside aspiring rapper Eli Porter on the September 20, 2011 episode of Tosh.0. In October, Grey was featured on American DJ Kaskade's seventh album Fire & Ice, writing and singing on two versions of the song "Room for Happiness", which became the album's third single and earned a Grammy nomination.

=== 2012–2014: Don't Look Down and collaborations ===
In August 2012, Grey appeared twice as a guest vocalist on American hip-hop supergroup Slaughterhouse's second album, Welcome to: Our House (2012). In September 2012, Grey's song "Building a Monster", was featured on the soundtrack to Tim Burton's Frankenweenie.

In 2012, Grey co-wrote Russian-German producer Zedd's 2012 single "Clarity" featuring Foxes, which won the Grammy Award for Best Dance Recording in 2014.

In February 2013, American recording artist CeeLo Green released a single titled "Only You", which he co-wrote with Grey. On March 8, 2013, Grey performed a six-song set for "Guitar Center Sessions" on DirecTV. Grey also contributed an exclusive song, titled "Slowly Freaking Out", to the soundtrack album for the film 2013 film The Host, based on the novel by Stephenie Meyer, In April 2013, Grey contributed to will.i.am's fourth solo album #willpower, on the song "Love Bullets".

On October 31, 2012, Grey announced Eminem would be executive producer for her album whose title she had changed from Invinsible to Don't Look Down. The album was preceded by the singles "C'mon Let Me Ride", "Final Warning", and "Wear Me Out". Grey's second album, Don't Look Down, was released July 5, 2013.The album debuted at number eight on the US Billboard 200 chart, selling 24,000 copies in the United States.

In September 2013, Grey released a music video for her cover version of Daft Punk's hit single "Get Lucky". In October 2013, Grey appeared on the track "The Last Day" on Moby's eleventh album, Innocents. On October 17, 2013, Grey previewed a new cover of Robert Palmer's "Addicted to Love" in a trailer for the 2014 remake of Endless Love. In November 2013, she appeared on Eminem's eighth studio album, The Marshall Mathers LP 2, on a track titled "Asshole".

On January 20, 2014, Grey released a song titled "Shot Me Down", with David Guetta. The song was successful charting in the top ten in several countries. In March 2014, a new collaboration with American recording artist Kid Cudi, titled "Hero", was recorded for the Need for Speed film and released on the film's official soundtrack. In August 2014, Grey appeared on American rapper T.I.'s song "New National Anthem", from his ninth album, Paperwork. In November 2014, Grey featured on Shady XV, a compilation album performed by various artists of Shady Records, on "Twisted" alongside Eminem and Yelawolf. In 2014, Grey teamed up with American rapper Nicki Minaj to co-write the song "Bed of Lies", from Minaj's third album, The Pinkprint. Grey sang on the recording and performed it with Minaj at the 2014 MTV Europe Music Awards and the December 6, 2014 episode of Saturday Night Live.

=== 2015–2017: Natural Causes and soundtracks ===
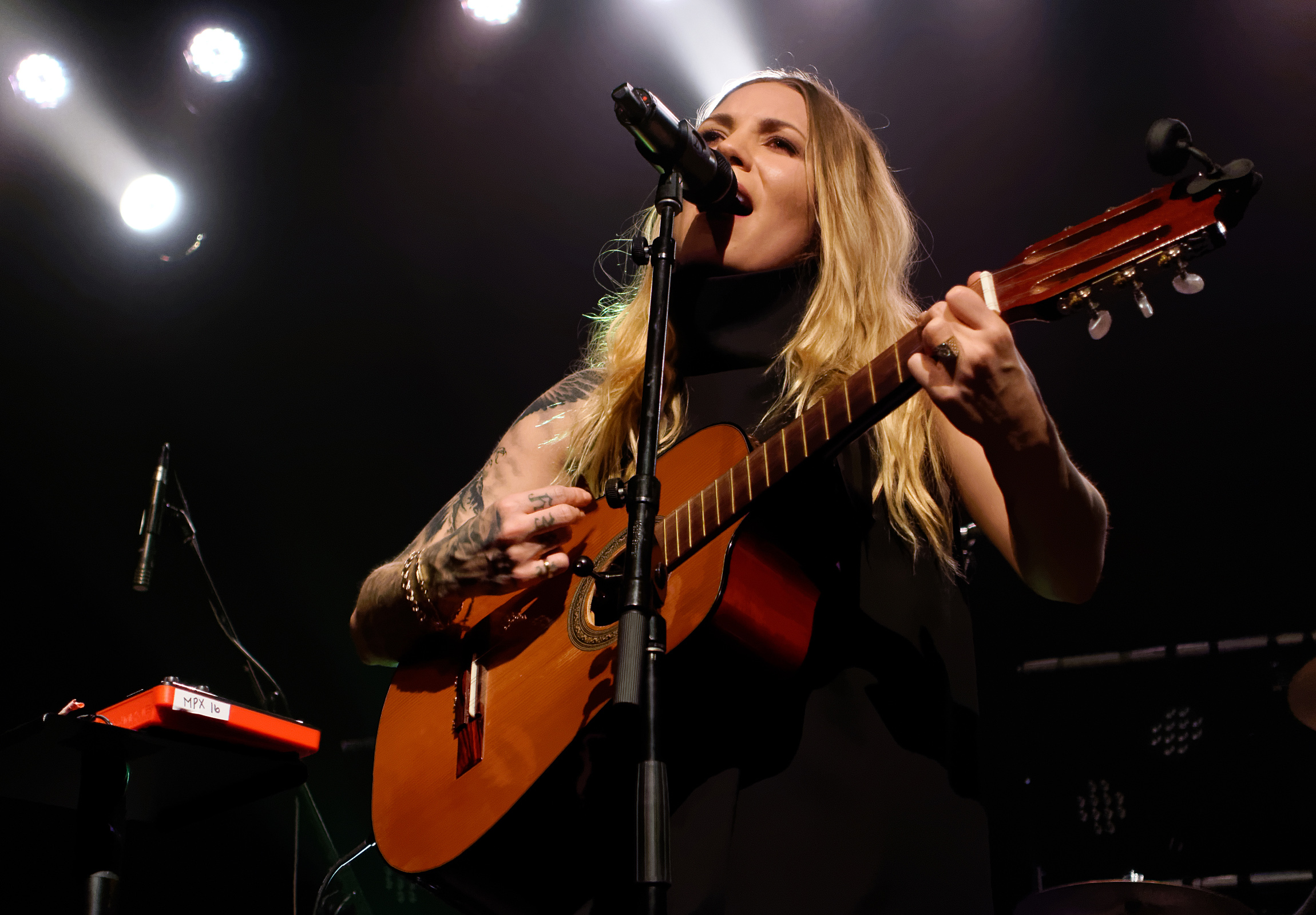
Grey performing in 2015

Grey confirmed on her official Instagram account that her third studio album would be released in 2015. In February 2015, Grey released a song from the Fifty Shades of Grey soundtrack called "I Know You". Also in February, Grey confirmed she has a song on the Furious 7 soundtrack, called "I Will Return." In March 2015, she released her version of "Addicted to Love" on iTunes, and also re-released the song "Words," which was deleted from the iTunes Store in 2013. On March 29, 2015, Grey appeared at her third WrestleMania event, performing a medley of "Rise" and "Money and the Power" at the thirty-first annual event, with Travis Barker and Kid Ink.

On May 18, 2015, electronic music producer Deadmau5 released a short demo on SoundCloud in collaboration with Kaskade, featuring vocals by Grey, titled "Beneath with Me". On October 6, 2016, a music video for the song was released.

Natural Causes, Grey's third studio album, was released on September 23, 2016. The album received positive reviews and was a moderate commercial success. It was preceded by the singles "Moving Mountains", the Eminem-produced "Come Up For Air", and "Lemonade". In the fall of 2016, Grey went on her Natural Causes Tour with morgxn.

In 2017, Grey provided vocals for the song "Wreak Havoc" and wrote Kehlani's "Gangsta" for the Suicide Squad soundtrack. Grey later co-wrote Kehlani and G-Eazy's song "Good Life" for The Fate of the Furious: The Album soundtrack. Grey collaborated with G-Eazy again, writing "Pick Me Up" for his album The Beautiful & Damned.

On March 31, 2017, American rock band Papa Roach released their song, "Periscope", featuring guest vocals by Grey. Grey was also featured on American rapper Macklemore's single "Glorious", released on June 25, 2017. The platinum selling single topped the charts in numerous countries. Grey collaborated with Eminem on his album Revival, co-writing the collaborations "Walk On Water" with Beyoncé, "Like Home" with Alicia Keys, "Need Me" with Pink, and "Tragic Endings" with Grey herself.

Previous collaborator Kaskade released his debut Christmas album Kaskade Christmas on November 24 and featured Grey singing a cover of "O Come, O Come, Emmanuel" retitled "O Come Emmanuel".

=== 2018–2020: Angel with Tattoos and Make It Through The Day ===
On January 25, 2018, Grey released a cover of Ben E. King's "Stand by Me", which was featured in a Budweiser Super Bowl LII commercial. A portion of the proceeds from the song went to the American Red Cross to benefit those affected by natural disasters. A music video was released on February 2, 2018.

In an interview with Uproxx published on January 26, 2018, Grey revealed that she was working on her fourth album and is planning on including her own version of "Walk on Water", which she had written for Eminem and Beyoncé, on the album. Later that year, Grey co-wrote and performed the single "Everything I Need", for James Wan's superhero blockbuster film Aquaman.

In May 2019 Grey, along with fellow artists Jamie N Commons and Gallant, released a new version of Soul Asylum's 1993 "Runaway Train". The video for the song was made in collaboration with the National Center for Missing and Exploited Children and utilizes geotargeting to show viewers missing children in their local area. The video was later nominated for a VMA.

On July 19, 2019, Grey announced on social media that she had left Interscope Records/KIDinaKORNER and that she would release her fourth studio album Angel with Tattoos. The first single released was titled "Shame On You". Angel with Tattoos was released as an EP on October 18, 2019, and she released the music video for the title-song of the album on the same day. Grey announced that the album is open ended, and songs will be added over time, stating; "Who knows? It could end up with a hundred songs, it could stop at five.”.

On August 7, 2019, Grey released a new song titled "New Kind Of Love" that was featured on Hulu's re-make of "Four Weddings And A Funeral". In the Aug. 24 issue of Billboard, Grey revealed that she had left Interscope Records due to "creative differences;" that her departure had been "amicable;" and that she had signed with Crush Music in 2017.

In 2019, Grey and her fiancé Elliott Taylor wrote "Falling In Love Again" for Celine Dion's Courage. Train also released a song featuring Grey titled "Mai Tais". The song was featured on the CBS show Magnum P.I.

On January 17, 2020, Eminem released his eleventh studio album, Music to Be Murdered By, featuring a song featuring Grey titled "Leaving Heaven". Furthermore, Grey co-wrote and produced the song, making her the first sole female to produce an Eminem song.

On July 14, 2020, Grey revealed her then-upcoming album title, Dark Thoughts. The project was preceded by the singles "Dark Thoughts", a cover of "Goosebumps", and "Sunscreen". The project was eventually scrapped as Grey announced she started working on a new album via various social platforms on January 16, 2021. Some singles released in 2020 were compiled as part of Make It Through the Day - EP, released on November 6, 2020.

=== 2021–present: Skylar Grey and Lofi Chill Vibes albums ===
On September 30, 2021, Grey's song "Last One Standing" was featured on the soundtrack for the film Venom: Let There Be Carnage with Eminem, Polo G, and Mozzy featured on the song.

After the release of several singles, Grey's eponymous fourth studio offering, Skylar Grey was released on April 28, 2022.

On July 15, 2022, Grey's song "My Heart Has Teeth", another collaboration with Deadmau5, was featured on the soundtrack for the series Resident Evil (2022). On October 27, 2022, Grey's song "Walking On Fire", produced by Th3rdstream, was featured on the soundtrack for the series Vampire Academy.

In 2023, Grey announced that she would be re-recording her back catalog after selling her masters to settle her 2021 divorce. The plan was to release a greatest hits collection in 2023, including Grey's original version/demo of "Love the Way You Lie", later recorded and released by Eminem and Rihanna and Grey's version of "Coming Home" (released by Diddy-Dirty Money). Grey released her next album Lofi Chill Vibes with Skylar Grey on August 11, 2023, featuring lo-fi versions of Grey's back catalog. Grey co-wrote and featured on Eminem's song "Temporary" from his 2024 album The Death of Slim Shady (Coup De Grâce).

== Artistry ==
=== Musical style and influences ===
Grey has listed Bon Iver, Fleetwood Mac, James Taylor, Shirley Manson of Garbage, Joni Mitchell, Radiohead, Marilyn Manson, Bob Dylan, Fiona Apple, Neil Young, Sarah McLachlan, Eminem, Death Cab for Cutie and Alana Davis as her influences.

=== Stage name ===
Grey explained that she thought her stage name "represents the unknowns in life. People seem to be afraid of the unknowns, but I'm the complete opposite. I dive into the unknown because I feel like that's where all your possibilities come from." She explained to Beatweek that she chose "grey" with an e rather than an a because "I like to do things the original way" and because "it's more masculine. I'm not a very feminine person."

== Personal life ==
Grey was previously married to Todd Jeremy Mandel. In 2017, she was granted a temporary restraining order against him after he allegedly stalked and followed her and her boyfriend, Elliott Taylor. Grey is currently engaged to Taylor.

== Discography ==
- Like Blood Like Honey (2006)
- Don't Look Down (2013)
- Natural Causes (2016)
- Skylar Grey (2022)
- Angel With Tattoos (2025)
- Wasted Potential (2026)

== Filmography ==
=== Film ===
Year	Title	Role	Notes
2014	Lennon or McCartney	Herself	

=== Television ===
Year	Title	Role	Song(s)	Notes
2011	American Idol	Herself	"Coming Home"	Performer with Diddy – Dirty Money
2011	Tosh.0	Herself	None	Episode "Eli Porter"
2013–17	Saturday Night Live	Herself	"Survival", "Walk on Water", "Stan", "Love the Way You Lie", "Bed of Lies"	Season 39, Episode 5 and Season 43, Episode 6 (Performer) with Eminem; Season 40, Episode 8 (Performer) with Nicki Minaj
2016	The Late Late Show with James Corden	Herself	"Real World"	
2017	Fox's New Year's Eve	Herself	"Glorious", "Coming Home", "Love The Way You Lie", and "Clarity"	
2018	The Today Show	Herself	"Stand By Me"	
2018	The Daily Show with Trevor Noah	Herself	"Love the Way You Lie", "Coming Home", "Clarity", "Glorious"	

=== Web ===
Year	Title	Role	Notes
2013	The Grizzly Diaries	Herself	1 episode

== Tours ==
- Don't Look Down Summer US Tour
- The Natural Causes Tour

== Awards and nominations ==
=== Grammy Awards ===
Grey has been nominated for five Grammys.

Year	Award	Nomination	Result
2010	Song of the Year	"Love the Way You Lie"	Nominated
2010	Best Rap Song	"Love the Way You Lie"	Nominated
2011	Best Rap Song	"I Need a Doctor"	Nominated
2011	"Best Rap/Sung Collaboration"	"I Need a Doctor"	Nominated
2011	Album of the Year	Loud	Nominated

=== MTV Video Music Awards ===
Year	Award	Nomination	Result
2006	Ringtone of the Year	"Where'd You Go" (with Fort Minor)	Won
2019	Video For Good	"Runaway Train" (with Jamie N Commons & Gallant)	Nominated

=== Teen Choice Awards ===
Year	Award	Nomination	Result
2011	Choice Music: R&B/Hip-Hop Track	"I Need a Doctor" (with Dr. Dre & Eminem)	Nominated
2017	Choice Music: R&B/Hip-Hop Track	"Glorious" (with Macklemore)	Nominated

=== Variety's Breakthrough of the Year Awards ===
Year	Award	Nomination	Result
2014	'Music Up Next' Breakthrough Award	Skylar Grey	Won

=== Vevo certified Awards ===
Year	Award	Nomination	Result
2011	100.000.000 Views	"Coming Home" (with Diddy-Dirty Money)	Won
2011	100.000.000 Views	"I Need a Doctor" (with Eminem & Dr. Dre)	Won
2020	100.000.000 Views	"I Know You"	Won

=== World Music Awards ===
Year	Award	Nomination	Result
2014	World's Best Entertainer of the Year	Herself	Nominated
2014	World's Best Female Artist	Herself	Nominated
2014	World's Best Album	"Don't Look Down"	Nominated
2014	World's Best Song	"Shot Me Down" (with David Guetta)	Nominated
2014	World's Best Video	"Shot Me Down" (with David Guetta)	Nominated
