= I Need a Doctor =

2011 single by Dr. Dre featuring Eminem and Skylar Grey

Single by Dr. Dre featuring Eminem and Skylar Grey
- Released: February 1, 2011
- Recorded: May–June 2010
- Genre: Hip-hop
- Length: 4:43
- Label: Aftermath; Interscope
- Songwriters: Andre Young; Marshall Mathers; Holly Hafermann; Alexander Grant
- Producer: Alex da Kid

Dr. Dre singles chronology
"Kush" (2010)	"I Need a Doctor" (2011)	"The Recipe" (2012)

Eminem singles chronology
"That's All She Wrote" (2010)	"I Need a Doctor" (2011)	"Writer's Block" (2011)

Skylar Grey singles chronology
"Coming Home" (2010)	"I Need a Doctor" (2011)	"Words I Never Said" (2011)

Music video
- "I Need a Doctor" on YouTube

"I Need a Doctor" is a song by American rapper Dr. Dre featuring fellow American rapper Eminem and American singer Skylar Grey. Written alongside producer Alex da Kid, it was released for digital download through the iTunes Store on February 1, 2011 and was initially released as the lead single for the then-unreleased third studio album, Detox, but production was ultimately cancelled before it was then released in 2015 under its new name Compton.

Musically, "I Need a Doctor" is predominantly a rap song, backed by a "spacey", drum-heavy production, with extra piano keys featured in the introduction and the chorus. Lyrically, the song is largely about Dr. Dre and Eminem's close friendship, and how they have often needed and inspired each other in the past.

Although the song was leaked onto the Internet several months in advance of its release, it became a significant commercial success on its official release, particularly in the United States, where it peaked at number 4 on the Billboard Hot 100, making it Dr. Dre's second highest peaking song on the chart ever. It also peaked in the upper regions of many other national charts. As of October 2011, it had sold over 2,206,000 digital copies in the United States alone, thus making it a double platinum record as certified by the RIAA.

== Background ==
Skylar Grey said that she and da Kid came to the studio with the hook to "I Need a Doctor" prepared; [Dre and Eminem] loved it. Eminem had then gone into the back room, and came out two hours later, and said that he was done writing his verses. Grey also said that she was in tears when she heard Eminem's verses for the first time and that da Kid initially proposed featuring Lady Gaga on the hook, but Eminem insisted on having Grey's vocals, and said that they were not taking her voice off the track.

== Music video ==
The video for "I Need a Doctor" was shot with Allen Hughes, the director of Menace II Society, From Hell and The Book of Eli. The video premiered on February 24, 2011.

=== Synopsis ===
The video begins with a written date "February 18, 2001", starting with an introduction of Dr. Dre's music career, such as when he and fellow N.W.A member DJ Yella were in the 1980s funk group World Class Wreckin' Cru. There are also scenes of Dr. Dre and his family, such as him hugging his daughter and son and getting married. There are also snippets from past music videos. It includes many rappers such as Eazy-E, 2Pac, The D.O.C, Snoop Dogg, Warren G, Nate Dogg, Eminem, Xzibit and all the rest of the members from N.W.A. The video then features Dr. Dre driving down Pacific Coast Highway in a Ferrari 360. Distracted with flashbacks of his life, he crashes his car, with the last thing he hears was his daughter say "Good night Daddy". He is then transported to a medical facility.

The video is fast-forwarded ten years later in the present day, where he has been hospitalized and is on life support. The Marin County Civic Center stands in for the medical facility. HP Touchstone / Touch-to-Share technology is featured as the way medical data is transferred from the doctor's phone to the medical tablet. Eminem raps next to him as he is floating in an isolation tank, during which the figure of the Pythia (played by Canadian actress Estella Warren) is singing as a hologram behind and over Dre, mouthing the words to Skylar Grey's vocal part in the song. Skylar Grey herself appears as one of the doctors in the video, but never actually appears singing her part. Dre eventually wakes up and goes through rehab, and the video ends with him standing next to the grave of Eazy-E, a rapper who had launched Dre's music career by founding N.W.A and was also a member along with Ice Cube, MC Ren and DJ Yella. A ticking clock is heard midway through the video.

=== Reception ===
The music video received complaints of being an "act of advertising" for a variety of product placements, such as Ferrari, G-Shock, HP, Gatorade, and Dr. Dre's signature headphones, Beats by Dr. Dre.

== Live performances ==
Dr. Dre, Eminem, and Skylar Grey performed the song at the 2011 Grammy Awards as part of a medley with "Love the Way You Lie (Part II)" performed by Rihanna, Adam Levine and Eminem. Eminem performed the first verse at the 2012 Coachella Festival.

== Critical reception ==
Nick Levine of Digital Spy gave the song a very positive review, rating the song five stars out of five, praising Alex da Kid's production and Grey's "haunting" chorus, but commenting that "what elevates 'I Need A Doctor' from "very good" to "a little bit special" are the performances of Dre and Em. [...] That single manly tear dribbling down your cheek? Entirely, entirely justified."

== Awards and nominations ==
On November 30, 2011, "I Need a Doctor" was nominated for the Grammy Awards for Best Rap/Sung Collaboration and Best Rap Song, both of which Kanye West won for his single "All of the Lights" from My Beautiful Dark Twisted Fantasy (2010).

Year	Ceremony	Award	Result
2012	Grammy Awards	Best Rap Song	Nominated
2012	Grammy Awards	Best Rap/Sung Collaboration	Nominated

== Track listing ==
German CD single

No.	Title	Writer(s)	Producer(s)	Length
1.	"I Need a Doctor" (explicit version)	Andre Young; Marshall Mathers; Holly Hafermann; Alex Grant	Alex da Kid	4:44
2.	"I Need a Doctor" (edited version)	Young; Mathers; Hafermann; Grant	Alex da Kid	4:45
Total length:				9:29

== Charts ==
=== Chart performance ===
The track first appeared on the UK Singles Chart, at number 21 on February 6, 2011—being Dr. Dre's sixth highest-charting single in the UK and his ninth Top 40 single. It has since peaked at #8 as of March 27, 2011. It debuted at number-5 on the Billboard Hot 100 with sales of 226,000, becoming his first top-ten single as lead artist on the chart in 16 years, since "Keep Their Heads Ringin'" reached #10 in 1995, also that number of sales was enough to earn a #1 in the chart Hot Digital Songs in February 19?. It is also his second highest peak on the chart ever as lead artist, behind only "Nuthin' but a 'G' Thang" which peaked at #2 in 1993. It has since peaked at #4 after selling 283,000 in its third week on the charts, the resurgence in sales seemingly due to its performance at the 2011 Grammy Awards.

=== Weekly charts ===
Chart (2011)	Peak position
Australia (ARIA)	12
Australia Urban (ARIA)	7
Austria (Ö3 Austria Top 40)	38
Belgium (Ultratip Bubbling Under Flanders)	3
Belgium (Ultratop 50 Wallonia)	47
Brazil (ABPD)	52
Canada (Canadian Hot 100)	8
CIS Airplay (TopHit)	159
Czech Republic Airplay (ČNS IFPI)	38
Denmark (Tracklisten)	30
France (SNEP)	29
Germany (GfK)	25
Ireland (IRMA)	11
Netherlands (Single Top 100)	55
New Zealand (RIANZ)	23
Poland (Polish Airplay New)	3
Romania (Romanian Top 100)	47
Slovakia Airplay (ČNS IFPI)	47
Sweden (Sverigetopplistan)	56
Switzerland (Schweizer Hitparade)	33
UK Singles (Official Charts)	8
UK Hip Hop/R&B (Official Charts)	3
US Billboard Hot 100	4
US Pop Airplay (Billboard)	19
US Bubbling Under R&B/Hip-Hop Singles (Billboard)	24
US Hot Rap Songs (Billboard)	16

=== Year-end charts ===
Chart (2011)	Position
Australia (ARIA)	63
Canada Canadian Hot 100	51
UK Singles (Official Charts Company)	63
US Billboard Hot 100	51

== Certifications ==
Region	Certification	Certified units/sales
Australia (ARIA)	4× Platinum	280,000^{‡}
Brazil (Pro-Música Brasil)	Platinum	60,000^{‡}
Denmark (IFPI Danmark)	Gold	45,000^{‡}
Germany (BVMI)	Gold	150,000^{‡}
New Zealand (RMNZ)	Platinum	30,000^{‡}
United Kingdom (BPI)	Platinum	600,000^{‡}
United States (RIAA)	2× Platinum	2,000,000^{^}
^{^} Shipments figures based on certification alone.^{‡} Sales+streaming figures based on certification alone.

== Release history ==
Country	Date	Format	Label
United Kingdom	January 30, 2011	Digital download	Aftermath; Interscope
United States	February 1, 2011	Digital download	Aftermath; Interscope
United States	February 22, 2011	Mainstream airplay	Aftermath; Interscope
Germany	March 25, 2011	CD	Interscope (Universal)
