= Like Blood Like Honey =

Studio album by Holly Brook
- Released: May 23, 2006
- Length: 46:49
- Label: Machine Shop, Warner
- Producer: Jon Ingoldsby, Holly Brook

Holly Brook chronology
Like Blood Like Honey (2006)	Don't Look Down (2013)

Professional ratings
Review scores
Source	Rating
AllMusic	3/5 stars

Like Blood Like Honey is the debut studio album by American singer-songwriter Skylar Grey, then known as Holly Brook. It was released by Warner Bros. Records on May 23, 2006. The album peaked at number 26 on Billboard's Heatseekers Albums chart.

== Track listing ==
No.	Title	Writer(s)	Length
1.	"Giving It Up for You"	Holly Hafermann · Jon Ingoldsby	4:03
2.	"Wanted"	Hafermann · Ingoldsby	3:56
3.	"What I Wouldn't Give"	Hafermann · Ingoldsby · Tiffany Hafermann	5:15
4.	"Like Blood Like Honey"	Hafermann · Ingoldsby	3:34
5.	"Again & Again"	Hafermann · Ingoldsby	4:18
6.	"Curious"	Hafermann	4:15
7.	"Saturdays"	Hafermann	3:02
8.	"Heavy"	Hafermann · Ingoldsby	4:24
9.	"Still Love"	Hafermann	4:19
10.	"All Will Be Forgotten"	Hafermann · Heather Holley	4:15
11.	"Cellar Door"	Hafermann	5:28
Total length:			46:49
