= Love the Way You Lie =

2010 single by Eminem featuring Rihanna

Single by Eminem featuring Rihanna

from the album Recovery
- Released: June 18, 2010
- Recorded: April–May 2010
- Studio: Effigy, Ferndale, Michigan, U.S.; Sun, Dublin, Ireland
- Genre: Hip hop; pop rap
- Length: 4:23
- Label: Shady; Aftermath; Interscope
- Songwriters: Marshall Mathers; Holly Hafermann; Alexander Grant
- Producers: Alex da Kid; Makeba Riddick

Eminem singles chronology
"Not Afraid" (2010)	"Love the Way You Lie" (2010)	"No Love" (2010)

Rihanna singles chronology
"Te Amo" (2010)	"Love the Way You Lie" (2010)	"Only Girl (In the World)" (2010)

Music video
- "Love the Way You Lie" on YouTube

"Love the Way You Lie" is a song by American rapper Eminem featuring Barbadian singer Rihanna from Eminem's seventh studio album Recovery (2010). Skylar Grey wrote and recorded a demo of the song alongside producer Alex da Kid. Eminem wrote the verses and chose Rihanna to sing the chorus, resulting in a collaboration influenced by their past experiences in difficult relationships. Recording sessions were held in Ferndale, Michigan, and Dublin, Ireland. Backed by guitar, piano and violin, the track is a midtempo hip-hop ballad with a pop refrain, sung by Rihanna, and describes two lovers who refuse to separate despite being in an abusive relationship.

Interscope Records released the song in June 2010 as the second single from Recovery. Critics praised its melody but were divided on its thematic aspects such as poignancy and accuracy. Eminem promoted the single with performances at the 2010 Electronic Entertainment Expo, the MTV Video Music Awards and festivals. The music video, directed by Joseph Kahn, stars Dominic Monaghan and Megan Fox as lovers in a violent relationship and shows Eminem and Rihanna in front of a burning house. The video met with a mixed reception due to scenes of domestic violence. Reporters suggested that the song and its accompanying video were influenced by Eminem's and Rihanna's abusive relationships with their respective ex-lovers, Kim Scott and Chris Brown.

Critics listed "Love the Way You Lie" among the best tracks of 2010 and of Eminem's career. The song won many awards and received five Grammy nominations. It is Eminem's best-selling single and ranked number one on several record charts, including the US Billboard Hot 100 for seven weeks. The single sold over 12 million copies in the US and 1.5 million in the UK. Musical acts such as Cher Lloyd and the Band Perry have performed cover versions. Rihanna has said that the theme of domestic violence, a topic on which she claims many people do not have insight, is what makes the song impactful. She later recorded with him again on "Love the Way You Lie (Part II)", narrated mostly from her perspective. "Love the Way You Lie" peaked at number one in 22 countries.

== Writing and production ==
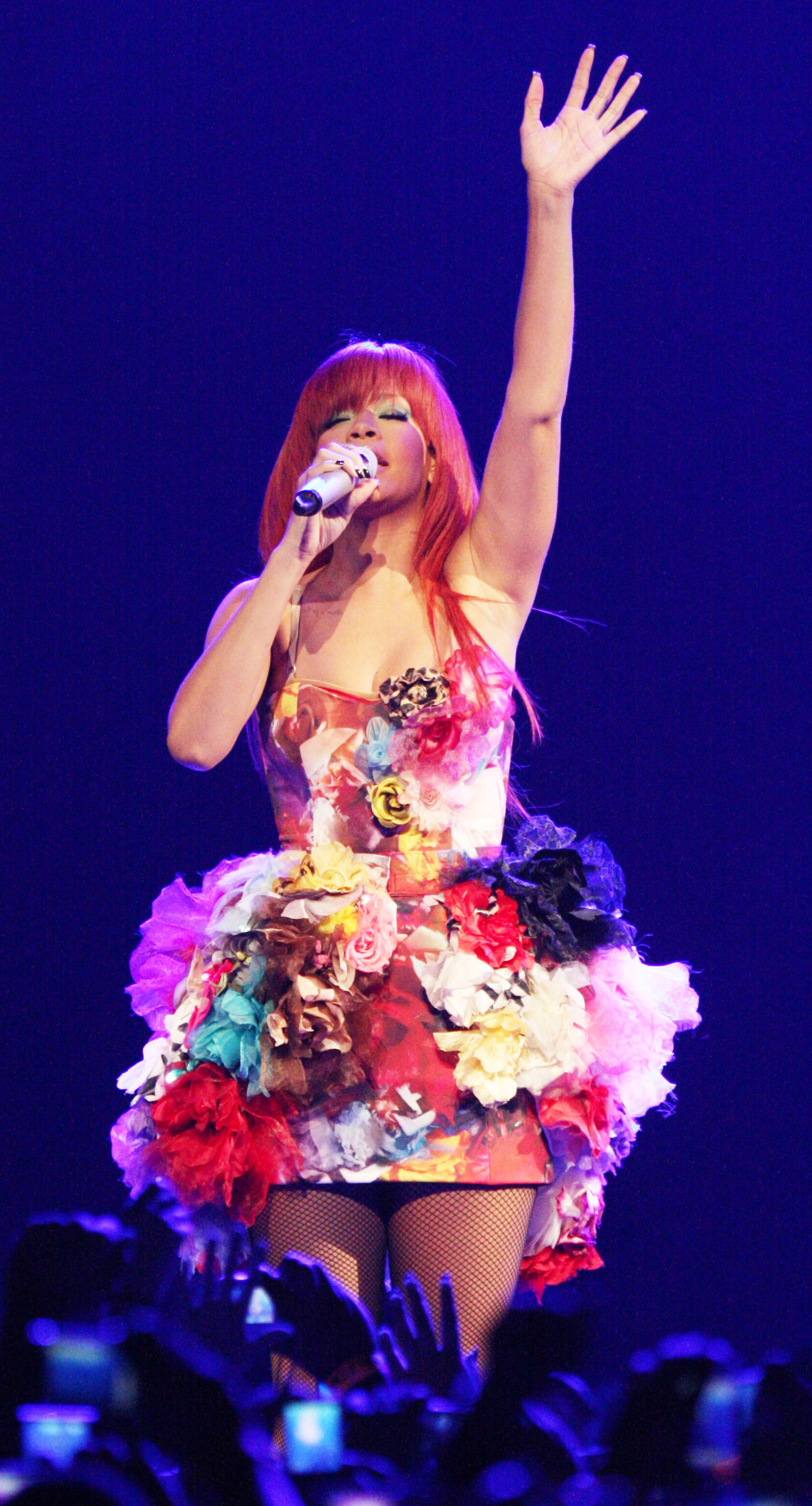
Rihanna's approval of the song's topic ultimately influenced her decision to work with Eminem.

The development of "Love the Way You Lie" began with the backing track and hook melody, which was created by British hip hop producer Alex da Kid. When making a track, he explained that he spends hours making loops and produces an electronic drum rhythm before adding live instrumentation. The drums are sampled from live recordings he saved. Alex da Kid recorded an acoustic guitar for the verses with a Neumann U 87 microphone and an Avid Mbox audio interface. He told Sound on Sound magazine that this song had given him an opportunity to reintroduce live guitar in hip hop music. During the session, he used Waves RVerb and REQ equalization on his main kick track and a MaxxBass plug-in on two others.

Writing began in late 2009, when singer Skylar Grey resided at the Artula Retreat in Bandon, Oregon, and wrote songs. Later, in New York City, she visited her Universal Music publisher, Jennifer Blakeman, to seek help presenting her work; Blakeman suggested she collaborate with Alex da Kid. The producer emailed Grey his track, which suggested a theme of abusive romantic relationships to her as she spontaneously sang lyrics to the melody. She told the Los Angeles Times that she was in an abusive relationship with the music industry: "I love it so much, and I give it all that I have, yet it beats me down." This idea inspired her writing, a process she found came naturally, as if she were creating an alternative pop song for herself. She wrote the chorus to "Love the Way You Lie" in fifteen minutes and recorded vocals for Alex da Kid's demo.

In early 2010, Alex da Kid offered Shady Records senior director Rigo Morales some backing tracks. Morales enjoyed the tracks and sent them to Eminem, who was seeking a different musical approach for his next album. Impressed with Alex da Kid's work, Eminem asked for more tracks and subsequently heard "Love the Way You Lie". He chose it and told his manager Paul Rosenberg he wanted to collaborate with the Barbadian singer Rihanna. Eminem told Skyrock, "It's one of those tracks that I felt like only she could pull it off." Rosenberg sent the track to Rihanna, who accepted Eminem's request "at the last moment." Eminem wrote the rapped verses to the song.

Rihanna has also said she joined the collaboration because she could relate to the theme of the song, as she and Eminem had been in difficult relationships on "different ends of the table". Eminem had released the songs "'97 Bonnie & Clyde" (1998) and "Kim" (2000), in which he fantasizes, respectively, about murdering and verbally abusing his then-wife Kim Scott. They had divorced in 2001 and again in 2006 after a remarriage. In February 2009, Rihanna's relationship with the R&B singer Chris Brown had ended following his felony assault on her. Rihanna described "Love the Way You Lie" as unique, realistic and deep, saying that it "broke down the cycle of domestic violence" because few people had insight on the topic.

== Recording ==
Mike Strange recorded and mixed Eminem's vocals at Effigy Studios in Ferndale, Michigan. The sessions took two days. Strange edited the vocals with D-Verb—a reverberation software—and an Extra Long Delay plug-in. He preferred to make few changes; for "Love the Way You Lie" he almost exclusively used board compression and console equalization. Strange used the Bricasti and Eventide Reverb 2016 mixing tools for "brighter" reverberation. Detroit musician Luis Resto has contributed to the arrangement on many of Eminem's songs, but did not do so for "Love the Way You Lie". According to Strange, "Everything we needed was already in the track, apart from the vocals." Two to three weeks after the sessions, Alex da Kid arrived to help mix and master the track. He wanted to replace the acoustic guitar on the demo, but Eminem chose to keep it. Strange said, "It was simply a matter of trying to match and then to improve on the demo [Alex da Kid]'d sent us." Strange's brother Joe engineered the track.

Rihanna's recording sessions took place at Sun Studios in Dublin, Ireland, and were engineered by Marcos Tovar. The R&B songwriter Makeba Riddick provided additional vocal production. Strange used equalization, compression and reverberation but left the vocal balance. He assumed that Rihanna was satisfied with her recorded vocals and did not make major changes on her seven stereo vocal tracks.

== Composition ==
"Love the Way You Lie"
A 26-second song sample. Backed by an electric guitar and a piano, Rihanna sings the second half of the chorus in a sad voice without vibrato. Eminem begins the second verse over an acoustic guitar, violin and drums, expressing frustration in his voice.

"Love the Way You Lie" is a midtempo hip hop ballad. The lyrics describe a couple's refusal to separate despite having an abusive relationship. The song's sheet music is in the key of G minor with a time signature and a tempo of 87 beats per minute. The vocal range spans from B♭_{3} to D_{5}. "Love the Way You Lie" opens as Rihanna sings the pop refrain over a piano:

Just gonna stand there and watch me burn?
Well, that's alright because I like the way it hurts.
Just gonna stand there and hear me cry?

Well, that's alright because I love the way you lie. I love the way you lie.

The refrain is based on a Gm–E♭_{(add2)}–B♭–F/A chord progression. Fraser McAlpine of the BBC wrote that Rihanna feels confined "in a cell of [her] own creation". She sings without vibrato, a pulsating musical effect used to add expression. One commentator, The New York Times' David Browne, wrote that despite this, her voice subtly shows grief and regret. Eminem then "zap[s] out into a ballady rap": "I can't tell you what it really is/ I can only tell you what it feels like." The verses follow a Gm–E♭_{(add2)}B♭–Fsus/A chord progression. Eminem regrets an end to an abusive, failed relationship, describing mutual violence and expressing both fondness and anger. The two artists' roles are portrayed in a romantic relationship when he responds to Rihanna by concluding the verse: "I laid hands on her. I'll never stoop so low again/ I guess I don't know my own strength." Rihanna sings the hook again, backed by an electric guitar and a piano.

Acoustic guitar, violin and drums accompany Eminem's verses. The lyrics transition from discussing positive aspects of love to describing violent events. Eminem raps, "It's the rage that took over, it controls you both, so they say it's best to go your separate ways. Guess that they don't know ya, cause today that was yesterday." Sady Doyle of The Atlantic interpreted these lyrics as the rapper's confession to having abused Scott, as he "turns the anger and accusations toward himself". In the second verse, Eminem accepts the outcome after feeling sorry, admitting, "Yesterday is over, it's a different day." His frustration increases and he raps that two personalities can clash and devastate: "maybe that's what happens when a tornado meets a volcano". The described love–hate relationship worsens and leads to domestic violence. Eminem admits to lying about promises he makes and explains late in the song, "If she ever tries to fuckin' leave again, I'ma tie her to the bed and set this house on fire", a reference to Rihanna's lyrics. Ironically, Eminem writes about Chris Brown's 2009 abuse, rapping "Spewing venom in your words when you spit 'em, You push, pull each other's hair, scratch, claw, bit 'em".

== Release and response ==
On May 27, 2010, Eminem revealed the title of "Love the Way You Lie" as part of the track list of his seventh studio album Recovery, which came out on June 21. Initially a radio single, the song was released later by Polydor Records as a CD in the United Kingdom on August 9, 2010. Interscope Records distributed it in Germany on August 20.

"Love the Way You Lie" received generally favorable reviews. An editor for Rap-Up listed it among the four best tracks from the album. New York Times writer Jon Caramanica considered it "one of the album's most engaging songs" and praised Eminem's ability to assess issues from the perspectives of both sexes. MTV's Rodriguez wrote that the song echoes content from Eminem's earlier albums, but finds him "sober" and "more mature". He added that the lyrics allude to Eminem's relationship with Scott and that "Love the Way You Lie" is his closest approach to a love song. Editors of The A.V. Club compared the single with "Kim" and "'97 Bonnie & Clyde"; they found he is more tempered in "Love the Way You Lie" when discussing a "mutually destructive relationship" and that Rihanna's involvement creates an eerie mood.

Critics especially praised Rihanna's contribution. Michael Menachem of Billboard complimented her "exquisitely melodic and surprisingly hopeful" vocal performance and "Eminem's dark, introspective" rapping. He noted that the percussion complements both artists and that Alex da Kid gave the classical arrangement a mainstream touch. Kyle Anderson, writing for MTV, remarked that the song showcases Rihanna's emotional vocals and Eminem's "most intense rhymes about his tumultuous relationships". He regarded "Love the Way You Lie" as an honest, "well-constructed pop song with a killer hook" and likened the "slow-burning" music to that of "Someone like You", a 2011 single by the British singer Adele. The Houston Chronicle pop critic Joey Guerra commented that Rihanna brought a "sandpaper and silk sheen" to the track.

=== Themes ===
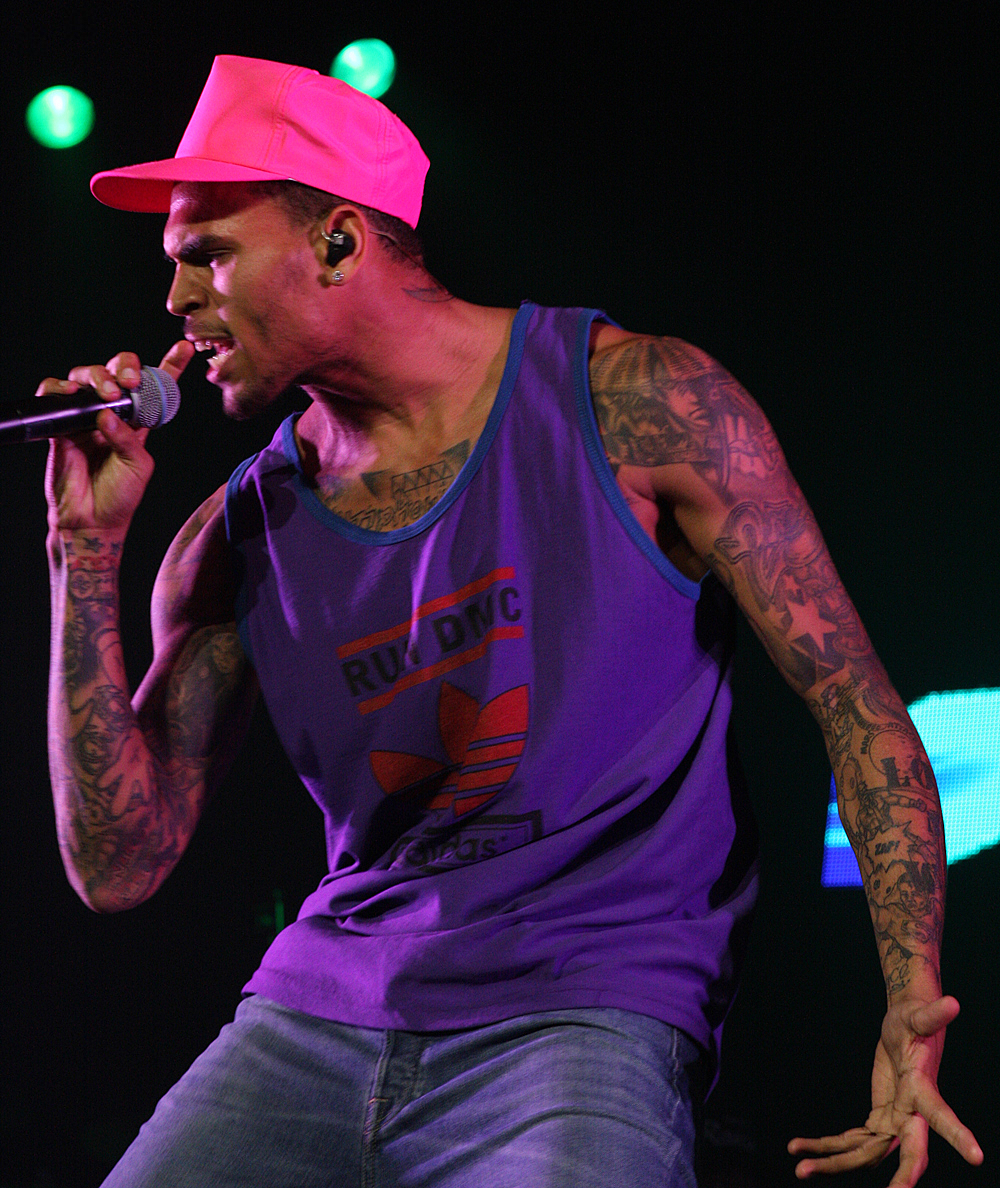
Many critics believed the song was about Rihanna's past relationship with Chris Brown.

Critics have commented on the message in the lyrics. Anderson noted a dark theme, while Nick Levine of Digital Spy, Allie Townsend of Time magazine and Jocelyn Noveck of the Associated Press suggested the previous relationships of both artists influenced the song. Levine gave it four stars out of five. According to Eric Hayden of The Atlantic Wire, the song refers to an alcoholic couple, possibly inspired by Rihanna's relationship with Brown. McAlphine awarded "Love the Way You Lie" four stars out of five. According to him, the song would not have been effective if it had featured only Eminem's point of view and feelings of regret; he wrote that Rihanna's representing the opposite side of the relationship shows "proper storytelling" and "sends a message" because of her breakup with Brown. McAlphine wrote that as a result the song depicts a more realistic abusive relationship and could be featured in a campaign for women's shelters. He praised Eminem's accuracy and understanding of the topic. Winston Robbins from Consequence of Sound attributed the song's poignancy to Rihanna's past abusive relationship, and a theme of infidelity and abuse.

On the critical side, The Daily Telegraph's Jenny McCartney dismissed the metaphors in the chorus and thought the song's topic was over-hyped. She disagreed with the critical praise, arguing that women accept abusive relationships for deeper reasons than sexual and emotional pleasure, such as family and financial issues and helplessness. In an NPR article, the writer Maura Johnston commented that the lyrics portray Rihanna as the subject of Eminem's violence. Jay Smooth, a New York radio personality, responded that "while Eminem explores the psyche of the abuser with an almost disturbing amount of depth and detail," Rihanna's perspective is downplayed and not explained fully. Johnston and Smooth wrote that such imbalances are a prevalent issue in popular music duets. To Sady Doyle, although "Love the Way You Lie" is one of Eminem's most affecting tracks and finds him remorseful, it does not make up for his past misogynistic actions and hateful songs. Jocelyn Noveck questioned whether the lyrics are "a treatise against (or apology for) domestic violence, or an irresponsible glorification of it? Or, is it something uncomfortable in between?"

Marjorie Gilberg, executive director of the anti-teenage violence group Break the Cycle, commented that "Love the Way You Lie" can teach listeners about the dangers of abusive relationships if interpreted correctly. She believed that because popular culture often depicts what is socially acceptable, people may accept such violence more easily. She added, "One problem, though, ... is that the song reflects myths about domestic violence—myths that lead to blaming the victim." Gilberg alleged the victim is often accused of being as guilty as the partner but wants to be loved, not abused. Terry O'Neill, a feminist and the president of the National Organization for Women, criticized the lyric, "But your temper's just as bad as mine is / You're the same as me", saying it is a typical excuse used by abusive men for aggression and that "it's only 2-year-olds and violent men who use violence to get what they want." She added that Rihanna unintentionally glorifies domestic violence in the song despite attempting to fight it.

=== Recognition ===
"Love the Way You Lie" ranked in various best-of-2010 lists. Claire Suddath of Time placed it at number five on her top 10 list and wrote, "That this song didn't come across sounding clichéd or tasteless is a testament to both artists' skill." AOL Radio considered the song on the Best Of 2010's hip hop music, regarding Eminem as imaginative and passionate. It ranked ninth on MTV News' top 25 list. Its editor James Montgomery attributed the song's success to its theme and relation to the artists' past abusive relationships. He concluded, "You cannot write a song any better than that, because that's how this kind of thing happens in real life." The New York Post placed the song at second place on their "Top 210 Songs From 2010" list and regarded it as a "comeback club anthem." In April 2011, Gabriel Alvarez of Complex magazine ranked it at number 100 on their "100 Best Eminem Songs" list, calling it a love song and praising Rihanna's vocals as beautiful. "Love the Way You Lie" and its accompanying music video were nominated for five Grammy Awards at the 2011 ceremony, including "Record of the Year", "Song of the Year" and "Best Short Form Music Video". It won the People's Choice Awards for "Favorite Music Video" and "Favorite Song".

== Commercial performance ==
"Love the Way You Lie" reached number one on several record charts worldwide. It entered the US Billboard Hot 100 at number two in the issue dated July 10, 2010. The single debuted at number one on the US Digital Songs after selling 338,000 digital copies in its first week. From July 31 to September 11, 2010, it had a seven-week run at the top of the Hot 100, giving Eminem his fourth, and Rihanna her seventh, number-one US hit. The single sold more than 300,000 digital copies in the week of August 14, 2010, rising to number two on the Pop Songs and Radio Songs charts. In the Billboard issue for August 21, 2010, Nielsen Broadcast Data Systems recognized the single with the BDS Certified Award for 50,000 radio spins. It topped the Pop Songs chart in the same issue, giving Eminem his third number-one track on the chart and Rihanna her sixth. "Love the Way You Lie" was the first number-one hit (for 10 years) on the Rap Songs chart with Eminem as the lead artist since his 2000 single "The Real Slim Shady". With sales of 4,245,000 copies, "Love the Way You Lie" was the third best-selling single of 2010 in the United States. There, it sold 6 million copies by October 2013 and 6.5 million copies by October 2015.

The song entered the Australian Singles Chart on July 4, 2010, at number 14. It rose to the top three weeks later, occupying the position for six weeks and staying on the chart for 38 weeks in total. In Austria, "Love the Way You Lie" debuted at number 31, on July 2, 2010, and ascended to number one on September 4. After making a final consecutive appearance on March 4, 2011, it reappeared at number 75 on August 26. The song spent 47 weeks on the chart. It was South Korea's third best-selling song in 2010 by a foreign artist, with 1,200,653 downloads.

On the UK Singles Chart, the song debuted at number seven on June 27, 2010, and peaked at number two four weeks later. By the end of 2010, "Love the Way You Lie" had sold 854,000 copies in the UK, making it the country's biggest-selling song of the year. It is the only song to top the year-end chart without topping the weekly charts. In October 2011, it became the 109th song to reach 1 million sales there. By November 2012, the single had sold 1.05 million copies in the UK, placing at number 100 on the Official Charts Company's "The Million Sellers" list. As of June 2015, it is the 17th best-selling single of the 2010s in the UK. According to the International Federation of the Phonographic Industry, "Love the Way You Lie" sold 9.3 million copies worldwide in 2010. In December 2011, it was certified as Eminem's best-selling single.

== Music video ==
=== Production ===
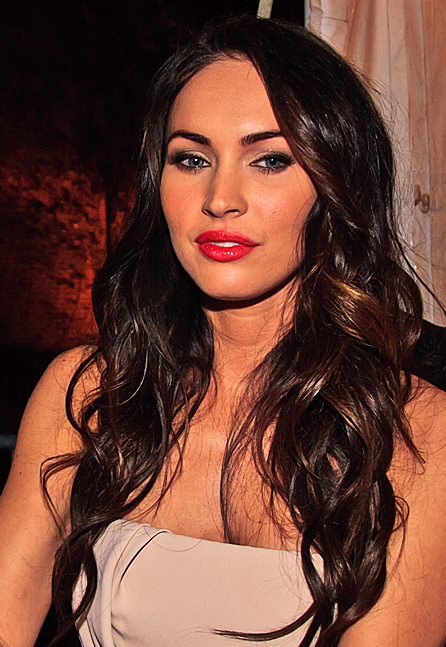
Megan Fox helped the video have a strong impact, according to the director Joseph Kahn.

The music video for "Love the Way You Lie" was Eminem's third to be directed by filmmaker Joseph Kahn. Despite having planned to shoot a feature film and stop directing pop videos, Kahn chose to work on "Love the Way You Lie" because, according to him, the song discusses an important topic. This was an opportunity for him to direct a video for Eminem without the comedic themes of their previous collaborations. For the video, Kahn considered The Lord of the Rings actor Dominic Monaghan as a co-star for his versatility, which he thought would help him play an antagonist. Kahn cast the Hollywood actress Megan Fox, which he had presumed would be almost impossible because of her popularity with directors. Fox, a fan of Eminem, accepted the role without hesitation.

Rosenberg gave Kahn one day to write a treatment, which Kahn finished in 45 minutes. He filmed Eminem's and Rihanna's parts on July 20, 2010; scenes with Fox and Monaghan were shot three days later. By July 24, 2010, they finished the shoot. Kahn confirmed the completion of the director's cut the next day. He said Fox's involvement made the video powerful, commenting for Vibe:

We wanted to make a specific story about two people—Meg and Dom—not a video that was representative of all couples or all domestic violence situations. I'm not saying that all couples fight this way. I just want people just to be able to identify with the characters and recognize that they've seen relationships like this where two people are together that are completely wrong for each other and things spiral out of control.... Megan was the key to this video.... I'll tell you as a director the reason why [Fox and Monaghan's] scenes in the video feel so real is because in the moment they were real.

Monaghan told MTV he thought the couple represents Eminem and Scott. The clip was produced by Kathy Angstadt and MaryAnn Tanedo of HSI Productions. Shortly before its release, Eminem reported in a press statement: "Joseph and I worked pretty closely together to make sure we got this right". He said the difficult topic resulted in a powerful video because of the contributions of Rihanna, Fox and Monaghan. Fox donated her appearance fee to the Sojourn House, a battered women's shelter. On August 5, 2010, the video premiered on MTV and the music video website Vevo (which is half-owned by Sony Music).

=== Synopsis ===
Eminem and Rihanna stand in front of a burning house in the video.

At the beginning, Rihanna sings the hook in front of a burning house, while an interspersing scene shows fire on a woman's (Fox) palms. In another scene, the woman is asleep with her lover (Monaghan) and wakes up. As Eminem begins to rap in an open field, the woman attacks her lover after seeing the name "Cindy" and a phone number written on his hand. He unsuccessfully tries to kiss the woman and brings her back after she attempts to leave him. The man then pushes her onto the wall and aims his fist at her, puncturing the wall instead. After Rihanna sings again, the video flashes back to when the couple first meet "at a seedy dive bar next door" to a liquor store. The man steals a bottle of vodka and they kiss on the rooftop.

During the present, the man apologizes to his lover and they are reconciled. In another flashback, he attacks someone who plays pool with his lover. At night, Eminem joins Rihanna in front of the burning house for the last verse. Meanwhile, after the flashback, the woman comes home and locks herself in the bathroom to stop her abusive lover from entering. In another scene, the fire on her palms vanishes as she claps her hands. Flames later engulf Eminem and the couple, who are then shown fighting in front of the burning house. In the end, the couple stays together and the video returns to their first scene, in which they sleep.

=== Reception ===
"It's the story of them getting to know each other, and it's the story of their tumultuous relationship, and it was the story of the breakdown of their relationship. Ultimately, what I think [Eminem]'s trying to say in the song ... is that he should have walked away a little bit quicker than he did and not let it get as messy as it did."

— Monaghan's interpretation of "Love the Way You Lie"

The video broke what was a YouTube record at the time of its release for the most views in one day, with 6.6 million. It had a mixed reception from critics, most of whom commented on scenes of domestic violence. NPR's Zoe Chace deemed the video as upsetting, while AOL Music listed it at number five on their list of the "Top 10 Most Controversial Music Videos in Pop". Stephanie Nilva—the executive director of trauma resource center Day One—told MTV News that it mainly raises "the topic of dating violence among young people". Nilva praised the video's accurate depiction of patterns in an abusive relationship and thought the video's potency came from Eminem's history of violence-themed songs and Brown's assault on Rihanna.

A writer for Rap-Up considered the video realistic, as "art imitates life". Conor Friedersdorf of The Atlantic called it an inaccurate portrayal of domestic violence due to insufficient violence, as evidenced by the lack of injuries after punching through a wall. Mariel Concepcion of Billboard suggested the video was inspired by the lyric, "Just gonna stand there and watch me burn, but that's alright because I like the way it hurts." Rihanna's appearance was criticized. Writing for Rolling Stone magazine, Daniel Kreps called it "especially striking" and noted her relationship with Brown. An editor from The Boston Globe commented that although the video is realistic, it hinders Rihanna's ability to set an example for women in abusive relationships. Billy Johnson Jr. from Yahoo! Music wrote that Fox's character alternated between vulnerable and confrontational personalities, while Monaghan's character is similar to Eminem. Kahn, who understood why viewers thought Eminem's and Rihanna's relationships influenced the video, asked that they realize this is untrue. He said the team had been conscious of such personal matters and Fox's and Monaghan's characters are only significant to each other.

Reviewers discussed the acting. Peter Gicas of E! News noted that Fox and Monaghan portray "combustible behavior the tune is hellbent on describing." The New York Post's Jarett Wieselman wrote that they play their roles perfectly and help make the video powerful. Entertainment Weekly's Whitney Pastorek found the violent acting sexually appealing, while Willa Paskin of New York magazine wrote that the cast's appeal "hypnotize[s]" viewers. Paskin noted the use of sepia toning in the burning-house scenes. Matthew Wilkening of AOL Radio commented that the video leaves viewers to decide "if it's a good thing or a bad thing that the pair always end up reconciling." Mikey Fresh of Vibe commented that Fox's natural reaction when Monaghan pierces the wall and almost hits her is an "incredible act of vulnerability". L Magazine's Benjamin Sutton likened the scene in which the characters burn to the Marvel Comics character Chris Bradley, whom Monaghan portrays in the 2009 action film X-Men Origins: Wolverine. As of September 2025, the video is one of YouTube's 50 most viewed videos.

== Live performances ==
Eminem has promoted "Love the Way You Lie" at concerts. On June 15, 2010, he and Rihanna performed the song at the L.A.Electronic Entertainment Expo 2010, accompanied by the drummer Travis Barker and D12's Mr. Porter. Eminem sang "Love the Way You Lie" at the festival T in the Park on July 10, 2010 in Scotland, dedicating it to "everybody who'[d] been in a fucked-up relationship." He then performed the song at Ireland's annual Oxegen festival on July 11, 2010. James Hendicott from State wrote that the rapper's personality "fill[ed] the stage" and that his vocals were sharp and packed "plenty of punch". He criticized the use of a pre-recorded backing track and noted the lack of live music along female vocals. Eamon Sweeney from the Irish Independent called Eminem's performance only "mildly impressive".

On July 21, 2010, the rapper joined Rihanna on her Last Girl on Earth tour to perform in Los Angeles, CA. He then performed at the 2010 MTV Video Music Awards and was voted the best performer of the ceremony in an MTV poll, earning 34 percent of votes. Rihanna made a surprise appearance despite having said she could not perform due to her schedule. Suddath of Time called their duet dull. Eminem sang "Love the Way You Lie" without Rihanna at the 2011 Bonnaroo Music Festival for almost 80,000 people. According to MTV News' Montgomery, the "sheer tenacity with which he attacked" was his strength. Patrick Doyle of Rolling Stone felt Eminem delivered a triumphal act by "constantly bouncing across the stage" and singing energetically.

Eminem performed "Love the Way You Lie" on the second day of Chicago's annual Lollapalooza festival on August 6, 2011. Members of the audience sang the hook to compensate for Rihanna's absence. Piet Levy of USA Today named the show a "tragic stunner", while Katie Hasty of HitFix added that it displayed competition between the sexes. Eminem and Rihanna performed in Staffordshire on the first day of V2011 (V Festival), on August 20, 2011. James Lachno of The Daily Telegraph considered it an "affecting" rendition. The Guardian called their performance thrilling and an editor for the British newspaper Metro felt that it was the best part of the evening. Eminem closed the festival on the night of August 21 in Chelmsford, Essex, for an audience of 120,000. A reporter for the International Business Times thought that Eminem's duet with Rihanna was the highlight of the show.

== Cover versions ==
Various musical acts have performed cover versions of "Love the Way You Lie". Eric Stanley, an American violinist, remixed the song on the violin. The country music group the Band Perry sang the song at the June 2011 CMT Music Awards. Two months later, Taylor Momsen—the lead singer of the American rock band the Pretty Reckless—performed a cover version for BBC Radio 1's Live Lounge as part of a mashup with the song "Islands" by the English pop band the xx. Assisted by a guitarist from her band, she began with a section of "Islands" and transitioned into the chorus of "Love the Way You Lie". Cher Lloyd, a British singer, performed the song in the final five of The X Factor UK's seventh season. Mernie Gilmore of the Daily Express commented that the song is "a duet for a reason" as Lloyd performed both Eminem's and Rihanna's parts. In 2010, the Russian guitarist Alex Feather Akimov released "Love The Way You Lie (Heavy Remix)", a recording that was recognized by Billboard.biz (Web Trends). The American post-hardcore band A Skylit Drive recorded a cover of the single for Punk Goes Pop 4, the 2011 release of the Punk Goes... series.

== Sequel ==
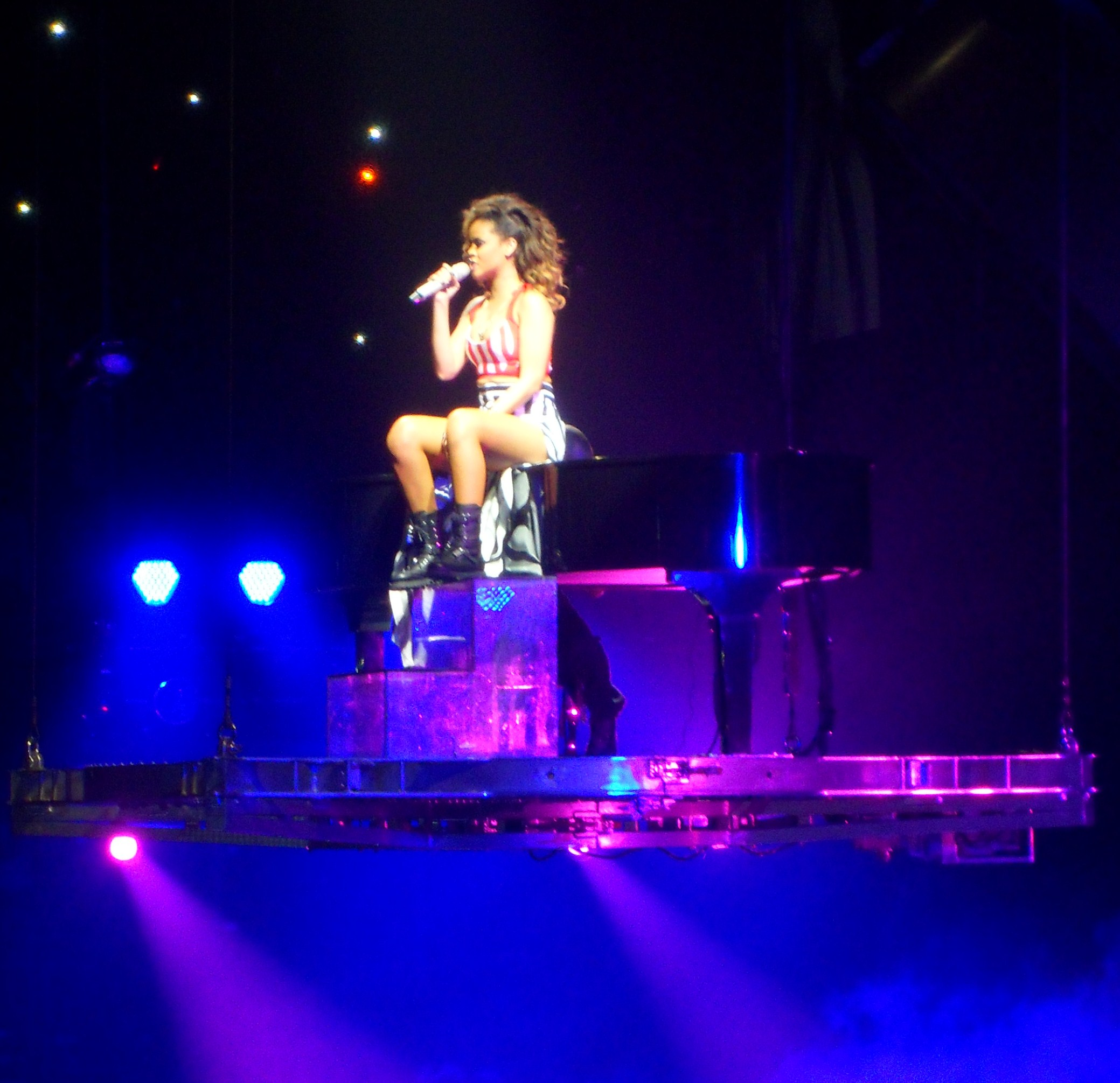
Rihanna performing "Love the Way You Lie (Part II)" on the Loud Tour (2011) in Birmingham, England

On November 3, 2010, an alternative version titled "Love the Way You Lie (Part II)" leaked onto the Internet. Rihanna is the lead vocalist and Eminem is a featured guest. The song mainly views matters from Rihanna's perspective and is based on Grey's demo. Rihanna agreed to record a sequel despite initially thinking "the original couldn't be beaten". She said that the sequel involved less production, with only piano and drums. It is the eleventh and final track on her 2010 studio album Loud. Grey's version appears on her 2012 extended play The Buried Sessions of Skylar Grey and her 2013 studio album Don't Look Down as "Love the Way You Lie (Part III)".

Rihanna performed a short medley that comprised "Love the Way You Lie (Part II)", "What's My Name?" and "Only Girl (In the World)" at the American Music Awards of 2010. Another medley, consisting of "Love the Way You Lie (Part II)" and "I Need a Doctor", was performed at the 2011 Grammy Awards. While the Chicago Sun-Times considered the track an unnecessary sequel, the BBC reviewer James Skinner wrote, "'Love the Way You Lie (Part II)' even bests the original, Eminem's verse exuding the kind of volatile, simmering menace that got everyone so excited about him in the first place. But it is Rihanna's vocal—at once commanding, soulful and vulnerable—that anchors the song".

== Awards and nominations ==
Year	Ceremony	Award	Result
2010	Teen Choice Awards	Choice Music: Rap/Hip-Hop Track	Won
2010	MTV Europe Music Awards	Best Song	Nominated
2010	MTV Europe Music Awards	Best Video	Nominated
2010	Soul Train Music Awards	Best Hip-Hop Song of the Year	Won
2010	People's Choice Awards	Favorite Music Video	Won
2010	People's Choice Awards	Favorite Song	Won
2011	BET Hip Hop Awards (2011)	Best Hip-Hop Video	Nominated
2011	BMI Pop Awards	Award-Winning Song	Won
2011	BMI Urban Awards	Award-Winning Song	Won
2011	NAACP Image Awards	Best Collaboration	Nominated
2011	UK Music Video Awards	Best Urban Video – International	Nominated
2011	Barbados Music Awards	Best Collaboration	Won
2011	NRJ Music Awards	Chanson Internationale de l'Année (International Song of the Year)	Nominated
2011	NRJ Music Awards	Clip de l'Année (Video of the Year)	Nominated
2011	Grammy Awards	Record of the Year	Nominated
2011	Grammy Awards	Song of the Year	Nominated
2011	Grammy Awards	Best Rap Song	Nominated
2011	Grammy Awards	Best Rap/Sung Collaboration	Nominated
2011	Grammy Awards	Best Short Form Music Video	Nominated
2011	Billboard Music Awards	Top Digital Song	Nominated
2011	Billboard Music Awards	Top Hot 100 Song	Nominated
2011	Billboard Music Awards	Top Radio Song	Nominated
2011	Billboard Music Awards	Top Rap Song	Won
2011	Billboard Music Awards	Top Streaming Song (Audio)	Nominated
2011	Billboard Music Awards	Top Streaming Song (Video)	Nominated
2011	MuchMusic Video Awards	Best International Artist Video	Nominated
2011	MuchMusic Video Awards	MuchMusic.com Most Watched Video	Nominated
2011	MuchMusic Video Awards	UR Fave: International Video	Nominated
2011	Detroit Music Awards	Outstanding National Single	Nominated
2011	Detroit Music Awards	Outstanding Video / Major Budget (Over $10,000)	Nominated
2011	MTV Video Music Awards	Best Cinematography	Nominated
2011	MTV Video Music Awards	Best Direction	Nominated
2011	MTV Video Music Awards	Best Male Video	Nominated
2011	MTV Video Music Awards	Best Video with a Message	Nominated

== Track listing ==
CD single

No.	Title	Writer(s)	Producer(s)	Length
1.	"Love the Way You Lie" (featuring Rihanna)	Marshall Mathers; Skylar Grey; Alex da Kid	Alex da Kid; Makeba Riddick	4:15
2.	"Not Afraid" (live at T in the Park)	Mathers; Drake Cooper; Luis Resto; Matthew Samuels; Jordan Evans; Matthew Burnett	Boi-1da; Jordan Evans^{[a]}; Matthew Burnett^{[a]}; Eminem^{[a]}	6:54
Total length:				11:09

Notes

- ^{^[a]} signifies an additional producer.

== Personnel ==
The credits for "Love the Way You Lie" are adapted from the liner notes of Recovery.

- Eminem – mixing engineer, writer, vocalist
- Rihanna – vocalist
- Alex da Kid – mastering engineer, mixing engineer, producer, writer
- Skylar Grey – writer
- Mike Strange – mixing engineer, recording engineer
- Marcos Tovar – recording engineer
- Joe Strange – engineering assistant
- James Darkin – engineering assistant
- Makeba Riddick – vocal producer
- J. Brow – guitarist

== Charts ==
=== Weekly charts ===
Chart (2010–2011)	Peak position
Australia (ARIA)	1
Austria (Ö3 Austria Top 40)	1
Belgium (Ultratop 50 Flanders)	1
Belgium (Ultratop 50 Wallonia)	1
Brazil (ABPD)	1
Canada Hot 100 (Billboard)	1
CIS Airplay (TopHit)	6
Croatia International Airplay (Top lista)	1
Czech Republic Airplay (ČNS IFPI)	2
Denmark (Tracklisten)	1
Europe (European Hot 100)	1
Euro Digital Tracks (Billboard) Explicit album version	1
Finland (Suomen virallinen lista)	1
France (SNEP)	3
Germany (GfK)	1
Hungary (Rádiós Top 40)	1
Ireland (IRMA)	1
Israel International Airplay (Media Forest)	1
Italy (FIMI)	1
Japan Hot 100 (Billboard)	55
Luxembourg Digital Songs (Billboard)	1
Mexico Anglo (Monitor Latino)	1
Netherlands (Dutch Top 40)	4
Netherlands (Single Top 100)	5
New Zealand (Recorded Music NZ)	1
Norway (VG-lista)	1
Poland Airplay (ZPAV)	1
Poland (Video Chart)	1
Romania (Romanian Top 100)	1
Romania Airplay (Media Forest)	1
Romania TV Airplay (Media Forest)	1
Russia Airplay (TopHit)	6
Scottish Singles Sales (Official Charts)	3
Slovakia Airplay (ČNS IFPI)	1
South Korea (GAON International Chart)	1
Spain (Promusicae)	1
Sweden (Sverigetopplistan)	1
Switzerland (Schweizer Hitparade)	1
UK Singles (Official Charts)	2
UK Hip Hop/R&B (Official Charts)	1
Ukraine Airplay (TopHit)	15
US Billboard Hot 100	1
US Adult Pop Airplay (Billboard)	29
US Dance Airplay (Billboard)	13
US Hot R&B/Hip-Hop Songs (Billboard)	7
US Hot Latin Songs (Billboard)	23
US Hot Rap Songs (Billboard)	1
US Pop Airplay (Billboard)	1
US Rhythmic Airplay (Billboard)	1

Chart (2022–2026)	Peak position
Global 200 (Billboard)	162
Greece International (IFPI)	93
Portugal (AFP)	164
Romania Airplay (TopHit)	95

=== Year-end charts ===
Chart (2010)	Position
Australia (ARIA)	1
Australia Urban (ARIA)	1
Austria (Ö3 Austria Top 75)	5
Belgium (Ultratop 50 Flanders)	21
Belgium (Ultratop 50 Wallonia)	11
Brazil (Crowley)	25
Canada (Canadian Hot 100)	7
Croatia International Airplay (HRT)	5
Denmark (Tracklisten)	7
Europe (European Hot 100)	8
France (SNEP)	35
Germany (Official German Charts)	11
Hungary (Rádiós Top 40)	35
Ireland (IRMA)	4
Italy (FIMI)	20
Netherlands (Dutch Top 40)	20
Netherlands (Single Top 100)	16
New Zealand (Recorded Music NZ)	2
Romania (Romanian Top 100)	26
Russia Airplay (TopHit)	42
South Korea International Singles (Gaon)	2
Spain (PROMUSICAE)	11
Spain Top 20 TV (PROMUSICAE)	19
Sweden (Sverigetopplistan)	4
Switzerland (Schweizer Hitparade)	3
Taiwan (Hito Radio)	8
UK Singles (OCC)	1
US Billboard Hot 100	7
US Hot R&B/Hip-Hop Songs (Billboard)	59
US Pop Songs (Billboard)	9
US Rhythmic (Billboard)	7
Worldwide (IFPI)	3

Chart (2011)	Position
Romania (Romanian Top 100)	97
Russia Airplay (TopHit)	151
Spain (PROMUSICAE)	41
Sweden (Sverigetopplistan)	37
Ukraine Airplay (TopHit)	110
UK Singles (OCC)	133

=== Decade-end charts ===
Chart (2010–2019)	Position
Australia (ARIA)	20
UK Singles (Official Charts Company)	45
US Billboard Hot 100	46

=== All-time charts ===
Chart	Position
UK Singles (Official Charts Company)	89

== Certifications and sales ==
Region	Certification	Certified units/sales
Australia (ARIA)	18× Platinum	1,260,000^{‡}
Austria (IFPI Austria)	4× Platinum	120,000^{*}
Belgium (BRMA)	Gold	15,000^{*}
Brazil (Pro-Música Brasil)	3× Diamond	750,000^{‡}
Denmark (IFPI Danmark)	3× Platinum	270,000^{‡}
France	—	145,000
Germany (BVMI)	5× Gold	1,500,000^{‡}
Italy (FIMI)	3× Platinum	300,000^{‡}
Japan (RIAJ) Full-length ringtone	Gold	100,000^{*}
New Zealand (RMNZ)	7× Platinum	210,000^{‡}
Portugal (AFP)	3× Platinum	75,000^{‡}
Russia (NFPF) Ringtone	3× Platinum	600,000^{*}
Spain (Promusicae)	Platinum	40,000^{*}
Spain (Promusicae) Since 2015	2× Platinum	120,000^{‡}
Switzerland (IFPI Switzerland)	3× Platinum	90,000^{^}
United Kingdom (BPI)	6× Platinum	3,600,000^{‡}
United States (RIAA)	13× Platinum	13,000,000^{‡}
Streaming
Greece (IFPI Greece)	2× Platinum	4,000,000^{†}
^{*} Sales figures based on certification alone.^{^} Shipments figures based on certification alone.^{‡} Sales+streaming figures based on certification alone.^{†} Streaming-only figures based on certification alone.

== See also ==
- List of best-selling singles
- List of best-selling singles in the United States
- List of best-selling singles in Australia
- List of number-one singles of 2010 (Australia)
- List of number-one hits of 2010 (Austria)
- List of Hot 100 number-one singles of 2010 (Canada)
- List of number-one singles of 2010 (Denmark)
- List of European number-one hits of 2010
- List of number-one singles of 2010 (Finland)
- List of number-one hits of 2010 (France)
- List of number-one hits of 2010 (Germany)
- List of number-one singles of 2010 (Hungary)
- List of number-one singles of 2010 (Ireland)
- List of number-one hits of 2010 (Italy)
- List of number-one singles in 2010 (New Zealand)
- List of number-one singles of 2010 (Norway)
- List of number-one singles of 2010 (Poland)
- List of number-one singles of 2010 (Spain)
- List of number-one singles of 2010 (Sweden)
- List of UK R&B Singles Chart number ones of 2010
- List of Billboard Hot 100 number-one singles of 2010
- List of Mainstream Top 40 number-one hits of 2010 (U.S.)
