= Charlotte Church discography =

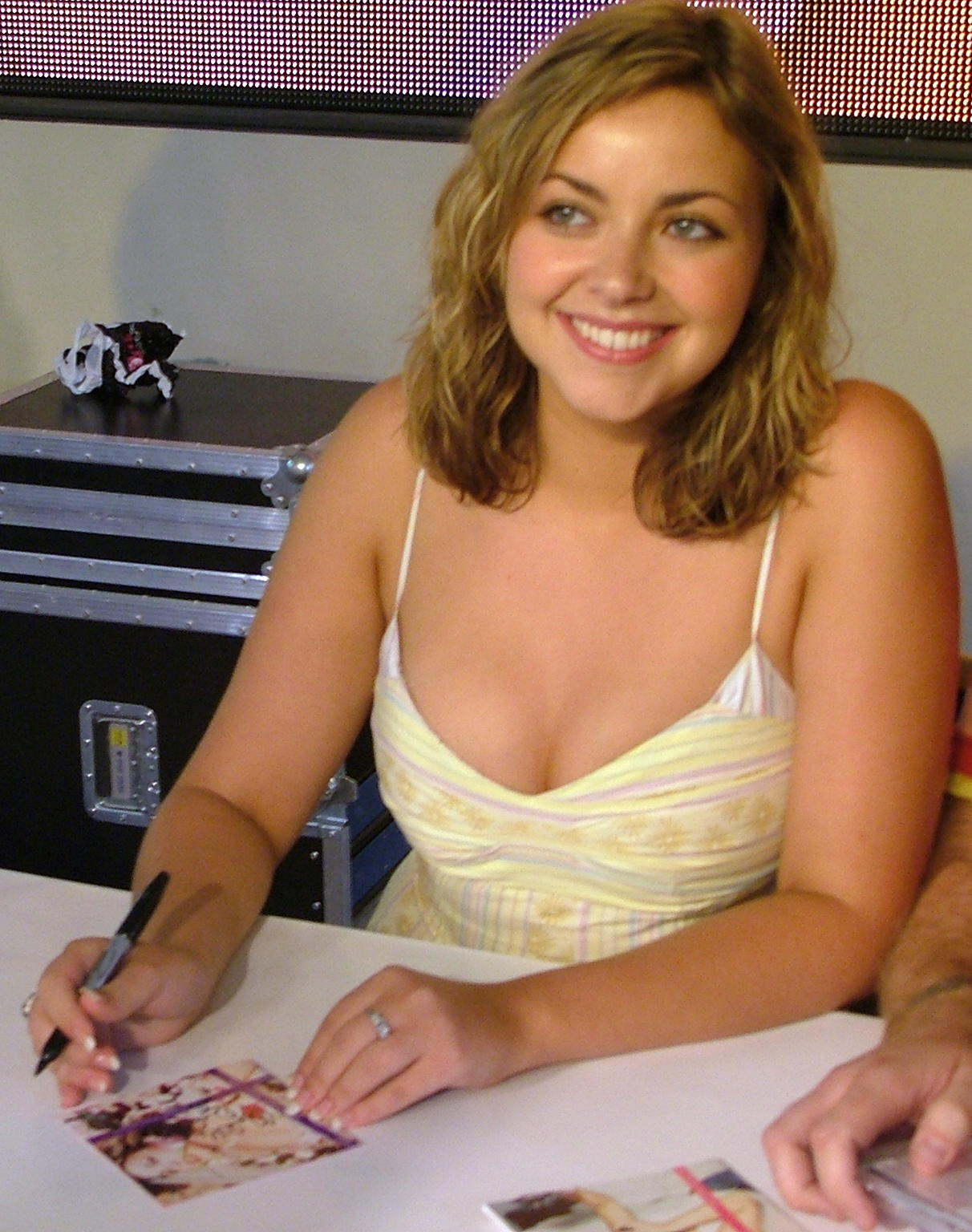
- Church at a Tissues and Issues signing in July 2005
- Studio albums: 6
- Extended plays: 4
- Compilation albums: 2
- Singles: 18

The discography of Charlotte Church, a Welsh singer-songwriter, actress and television presenter. Church rose to fame in childhood as a classical crossover singer before branching into pop music in 2005.

== Albums ==
=== Studio albums ===
Album details	Peak chart positions										Certifications (sales thresholds)
Album details	UK	AUS	FRA	GER	IRE	NL	NZ	SWE	SWI	US	Certifications (sales thresholds)
Voice of an Angel: Released: 9 November 1998; Label: Sony Classical; Formats: CD, cassette	4	22	49	51	—	15	33	—	42	28	BPI: 2× Platinum; ARIA: Platinum; RIAA: 2× Platinum
Charlotte Church: Released: 15 November 1999; Label: Sony Classical; Formats: CD, cassette	8	41	—	84	44	12	16	44	65	40	BPI: Platinum; ARIA: Gold; RIAA: Platinum
Dream a Dream: Released: 17 October 2000; Label: Sony Classical; Formats: CD, cassette	30	64	—	—	33	24	—	—	—	7	BPI: Gold; RIAA: Platinum
Enchantment: Released: 9 October 2001; Label: Columbia; Formats: CD, cassette	24	58	—	—	27	58	19	—	—	15	BPI: Gold; RIAA: Gold
Tissues and Issues: Released: 11 July 2005; Label: Sony BMG; Formats: CD, digital download	5	—	—	—	27	—	—	—	—	—	BPI: Gold; IRMA: Gold
Back to Scratch: Released: 25 October 2010; Label: Dooby Records; Formats: CD, digital download	23	—	—	—	—	—	—	—	—	—	
"—" denotes releases that did not chart.

=== Compilation albums ===
Album details	Peak chart positions		
Album details	UK	IRE	US
Prelude: The Best of Charlotte Church: Released: 25 November 2002; Label: Columbia; Formats: CD, cassette	85	68	76
One & Two: Released: 12 March 2013; Label: Alligator Wine; Formats: CD, digital download	—	—	—
"—" denotes releases that did not chart or was not released in particular country.

== Extended plays ==
EP details
One
- Released: 3 September 2012
- Label: Alligator Wine
- Formats: CD, digital download
Two
- Released: 4 March 2013
- Label: Alligator Wine
- Formats: CD, digital download
Three
- Released: 19 August 2013
- Label: Alligator Wine
- Formats: CD, digital download
Four
- Released: 10 March 2014
- Label: Alligator Wine
- Formats: CD, digital download

== Singles ==
Year	Title	Peak chart positions				Album
Year	Title	UK	AUS	IRE	NZ	Album
2000	"Just Wave Hello"	31	—	—	—	Charlotte Church
2000	"Dream a Dream" (with Billy Gilman)	—	—	—	—	Dream a Dream
2002	"Carrickfergus"	—	—	—	—	Enchantment
2003	"The Opera Song" (Jurgen Vries featuring CMC)	3	62	25	—	Non-album single
2005	"Crazy Chick"	2	39	10	33	Tissues and Issues
2005	"Call My Name"	10	60	16	—	Tissues and Issues
2005	"Even God Can't Change the Past"	17	—	38	—	Tissues and Issues
2006	"Moodswings (To Come at Me like That)"	14	—	42	—	Tissues and Issues
2010	"Back to Scratch"	—	—	—	—	Back to Scratch
2010	"Logical World"	—	—	—	—	Back to Scratch
2011	"Snow"	—	—	—	—	Back to Scratch
2012	"How Not to Be Surprised When You're a Ghost"	—	—	—	—	One
2012	"Glitterbombed"	—	—	—	—	Two
2013	"Lasts, or Eschaton"	—	—	—	—	Two
2013	"I Can Dream"	—	—	—	—	Three
2013	"Water Tower"	—	—	—	—	Three
2014	"Little Movements"	—	—	—	—	Four
2022	"Come What May" (Luke Evans featuring Charlotte Church)	—	—	—	—	A Song for You
"—" denotes releases that did not chart.

== Video albums ==
- 1999 – Voice of an Angel in Concert
- 2000 – Dream a Dream: Charlotte Church in the Holy Land
- 2001 – Charlotte Church in Jerusalem
- 2001 – Plácido Domingo, Charlotte Church, Vanessa Williams and Tony Bennett Our Favourite Things: Christmas in Vienna
- 2002 – Enchantment from Cardiff, Wales
- 2002 – Prelude: The Best of Charlotte Church DVD
- 2007 – Charlotte Church's Funny Bits: Best of the Charlotte Church Show: Series 1 & 2
- 2009 – Voice of an Angel soundtrack
