= Mood =

Mood or moods may refer to:

- Mood (psychology), a relatively long lasting emotional state

== Music ==
=== Bands ===
- Mood (band), hip hop artists
- The Mood, a British pop band from 1981 to 1984

=== Albums and EPs ===
- Mood (Jacquees album), 2016
- Mood (Robert Glasper album), 2004
- Mood, by Nayt, 2020
- Moods (Barbara Mandrell album), 1978
- Moods (Mal Waldron album), 1978
- Moods (Monday Michiru album), 2003
- Moods (Neil Diamond album), 1972
- Moods (Paul Quinichette album), 1955
- Moods (The Three Sounds album), 1960
- The Mood (EP), by F.T. Island, 2013

=== Songs ===
- "Mood" (24kGoldn song), featuring Iann Dior, 2020
- "Mood" (Eva song), 2018
- "Mood", by Lil Uzi Vert, 2018
- "Mood", by Rita Ora featuring Khea from Bang, 2021
- "Moodz", by Blackbear from Digital Druglord, 2017
- "The Mood", by Flo and Kaytranada, 2025

== People ==
- Robert Mood (born 1958), a Norwegian general
- Alexander M. Mood (1913 – 2009), an American statistician and operations reseracher
- Doug Mood (born 1943), an American politician
- Julia Peterkin (née Mood, 1880 – 1961), an American author

== Places ==
- Mood (city), a city in Iran
- Mood, Leh, a village in Ladakh, India
- Mood District, a district in Iran
- MOOD Designer Fabrics, a store in New York City frequented by contestants of Project Runway

== Other uses ==
- Mood (TV series), 2022 British drama
- Grammatical mood, one of a set of morphologically distinctive forms that are used to signal modality
- Mood (narrative), the affective setting of a piece of literature
- Moods (novel), 1864 novel by Louisa May Alcott

== See also ==
- Mood Indigo (disambiguation)
- Mood music (disambiguation)
- Mood Muzik (disambiguation)
- Mood Ring (disambiguation)
- Mood Swings (disambiguation)
