= Kalenna Harper =

American singer (born 1982)

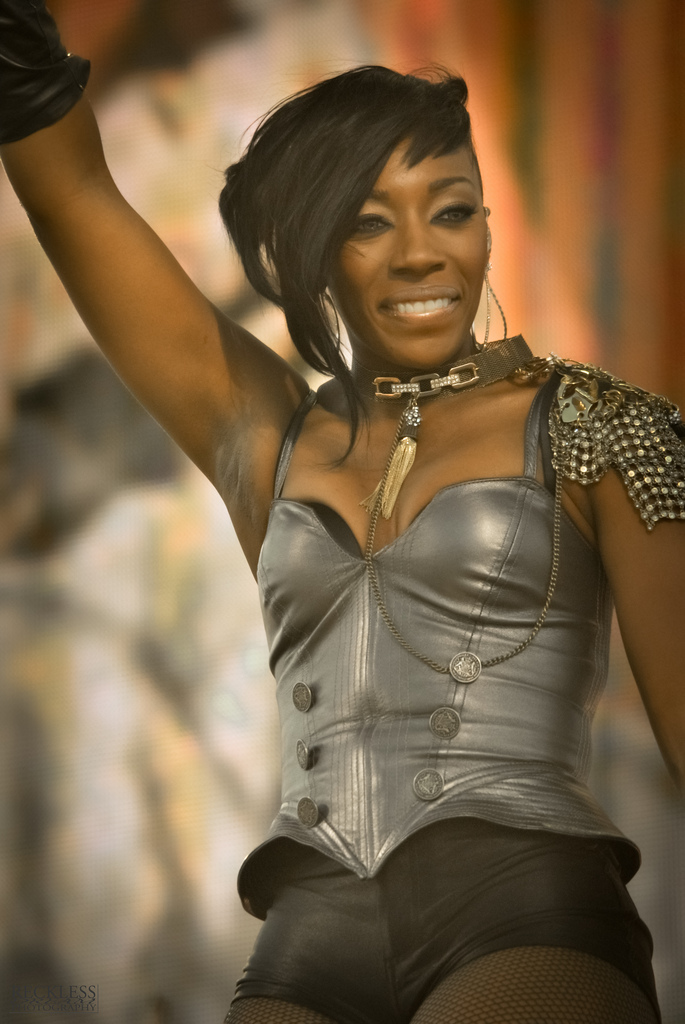
- Harper in 2010

Background information
- Also known as: Kalenna Vick
- Born: Kalenna LaShante Harper; August 13, 1982 (age 44); Philadelphia, Pennsylvania, U.S.
- Origin: Atlanta, Georgia, U.S.
- Genres: R&B
- Occupations: Singer; songwriter
- Years active: 2004–2019
- Labels: Phantom Music; EMI; Bad Boy
- Formerly of: Dirty Money
- Spouse: Anthony Vick (m. 2009)
- Children: 4

Kalenna LaShante Harper-Vick (kuh-LEE-nuh; born August 13, 1982) is an American singer-songwriter. She is best known as a member of the musical trio Diddy – Dirty Money, which was formed by herself, Dawn Richard, and Sean Combs in 2009. The group signed with the latter's Bad Boy Records to release their only album Last Train to Paris (2010), which was met with critical and commercial success. They also released two mixtapes until their disbandment in 2012.

Prior, Harper was credited with songwriting and production work for other R&B acts. From 2014 to 2015, she was a supporting cast member on the VH1 reality series Love & Hip Hop: Atlanta.

== Career ==
=== 2004–2008: Songwriting and album appearances ===
Harper has predominantly written songs for other artists, such as Christina Milian's "Peanut Butter & Jelly", Charlotte Church's "Moodswings (To Come at Me Like That)", Aretha Franklin's "Put You Up on Game", Pussycat Dolls' "Painted Windows" and Ciara's "Pucker Up". She was featured on Rasheeda's GA Peach on the track "Pack Ya Bags" and Timati's The Boss on the track "Sexy Bitch". Her 2008 song, "Kaboom" (with Lady Gaga) was recorded during their sessions with producer Jim Jonsin; the song remains unreleased. Additional credits include Maino's "Don't Say Nothing," Three 6 Mafia's "Shake My," and Ciara's "Kiss My Swag." She has contributed to the film soundtrack of Phat Girlz (2006) with her song "Stronger", as well as Confessions of a Shopaholic (2009) with her song "Big Spender." Harper guest performed on Trina's 2010 song "Let Them Hoes Fight", which was co-produced by Lady Gaga (Gaga was the intended guest performer).<

=== 2009–2012: Diddy – Dirty Money ===
In 2009, Harper joined Diddy – Dirty Money, which was formed by label boss Sean Combs and labelmate, former Danity Kane member Dawn Richard. The group's debut single, "Angels" was released in November of that year. It featured a posthumous guest appearance from the Notorious B.I.G., and its music video was directed by Hype Williams. The band's follow-up single, "Love Come Down" was released that same day, although the latter was ultimately omitted from the Last Train To Paris album.

On November 13, 2009, the song "Hurt" by the group was leaked; it was a demo which became known as "Loving You No More," and featured Drake. The group's third single, "Hello Good Morning" (featuring T.I.) was released on March 30, 2010. In November 2010, Harper and the group saw their furthest commercial success with the release of the album's fourth single "Coming Home" (featuring Skylar Grey), which peaked at number 11 on the Billboard Hot 100 and remains one of the best performing hip hop songs of that year. Its reception expedited the album's release in December of that year, and it peaked at number seven on the Billboard 200. Critical reviews were generally positive.

The group performed at the 2010 BET Awards, while they were nominated for the BET Award for Best Group. She co-wrote the song "Bionic" for Christina Aguilera, from her fourth studio album, Bionic (2010).

In 2012, the group disbanded. Harper then continued work on her solo career, releasing her debut solo mixtape, Chamber of Diaries in June of that year.

=== 2012–2015: Black Orchid, Love & Hip Hop: Atlanta ===
Kalenna released a mix-tape called Chamber of Diaries on February 13, 2012, free of charge, consisting of thirteen tracks. The mixtapes lead single, "Go To Work" was released in November 2011. After the split-up of Dirty Money she was also going to work on her debut solo album Black Orchid but the album somehow never dropped.

She was a recurring cast member in seasons 3 & 4 of Love & Hip Hop: Atlanta. During the span of the show, Kalenna released "Murder" and "Space and Time" on iTunes.

== Discography ==
=== Studio albums ===
| Album | Peak chart positions | | | | |
| Album | U.S. | U.S. R&B | CAN | UK | FRA |
|---|---|---|---|---|---|
| Last Train to Paris (with Diddy and Dawn Richard as Diddy – Dirty Money): Released: December 13, 2010; Label: Bad Boy, Interscope; Formats: CD, digital download | 7 | 3 | 67 | 24 | 194 |

=== Mixtapes ===
| Year | Title |
|---|---|
| 2012 | Chamber of Diaries: Released: February 13, 2012; Label: Phantom Music; Formats: Digital download |

=== As featured artist ===
List of singles, with selected chart positions
| Year | Title | Peak chart positions | | | | | | | Certifications | Album |
| Year | Title | AUT | BEL | FRA | GER | NED | SPA | SWI | Certifications | Album |
|---|---|---|---|---|---|---|---|---|---|---|
| 2009 | "Shake My" (Three 6 Mafia featuring Kalenna) | — | — | — | — | — | — | — | | Non-album single |
| 2010 | "Don't Say Nothin" (Maino featuring Kalenna) | — | — | — | — | — | — | — | | The Day After Tomorrow |
| 2010 | "Beatbox" (D. Brown featuring Kalenna) | — | — | — | — | — | — | — | | Non-album single |
| 2011 | "Welcome to St. Tropez" (DJ Antoine vs. Timati featuring Kalenna) | 4 | 9 | 7 | 3 | 7 | 16 | 2 | AUT: Gold; GER: 3× Gold; SWI: Platinum | 2011 |
| 2011 | "To The Top" (Ja Rule featuring Kalenna) | — | — | — | — | — | — | — | | Pain Is Love 2 |
| 2019 | "Oceans" (James Artissen featuring Kalenna) | — | — | — | — | — | — | — | | Blu Leisure |

=== As songwriter ===
| Year | Song | Artist(s) | Album |
|---|---|---|---|
| 2004 | "Peanut Butter & Jelly" | Christina Milian | It's About Time |
| 2005 | "Moodswings (To Come at Me Like That)" | Charlotte Church | Tissues and Issues |
| 2007 | "Put You Up on Game" | Aretha Franklin, Fantasia | Jewels in the Crown: All-Star Duets with the Queen |
| 2008 | "Painted Windows" | The Pussycat Dolls | Doll Domination |
| 2009 | "Big Spender" | Adrienne Bailon | Confessions of a Shopaholic |
| 2009 | "Pucker Up" | Ciara | Fantasy Ride |
| 2009 | "Love Come Down" | Diddy – Dirty Money | Non-album single |
| 2009 | "Freezer Burn" | Kalenna, Lady Gaga, Jim Jonsin | Demos |
| 2009 | "Kaboom" | Kalenna, Lady Gaga, Jim Jonsin | Demos |
| 2009 | "Let Them Hoes Fight" | Trina Lady Gaga | Amazin' |
| 2010 | "Bionic" | Christina Aguilera | Bionic |
| 2011 | "Welcome to St. Tropez" | DJ Antoine vs. Timati | 2011 |
| 2013 | "Paradise" | DJ Antoine feat. Kalenna | Sky Is the Limit |
| 2014 | "Thug Cry" | Tinashe | Aquarius |
| 2015 | "Getaway" | Prince Royce | Double Vision (Deluxe Edition) |
| 2016 | "Hold On" | Mýa | Smoove Jones |
| 2016 | "Listen" | Nicole Michelle | TBA |
| 2019 | "Nowhere" | Crystal Tamar | Serenade |
| 2019 | "Gasoline" | Crystal Tamar | Serenade |

== Filmography ==
=== Television ===
| Year | Title | Role | Notes |
|---|---|---|---|
| 2014–2015 | Love & Hip Hop: Atlanta | Herself | Supporting Cast |
