= Serabee =

- Also known as: Sera Buras
- Born: Sarah L. Buras; Kiln, Mississippi
- Genres: urban; soul; rhythm and blues; gospel; blues; blues rock; pop
- Occupation: singer-songwriter
- Instruments: vocals; pianos; drums; keyboards; steel guitar; acoustic guitar; Hammond B3 organ
- Years active: 2002–present
- Labels: EMI; Aezra Records; Universal Republic; Cash Money Records; Rabadash Records
- Formerly of: Sera and the Blue Jays
- Website: Official website

Sarah L. Buras, professionally known as Serabee, is an American singer-songwriter. She has released eight studio albums. In 2005, Serabee wrote the hit song "Crazy Chick", which she considers autobiographical. In her backstage video interview at NBC's The Voice, she told viewers that she wrote the song in Mississippi on the way to Walmart. Just a few months later, the song was recorded by singer Charlotte Church. It became a hit on the UK Singles Chart, reaching No. 2 on the UK Singles Top 75. The song ranked 40th on the 2005 UK Year End Singles Chart.

In 2011, Serabee became a contestant on the U.S. reality talent show The Voice, which airs on the NBC television network. The premise of the show includes pairing up widely undiscovered vocalists with highly successful recording artists, who serve as vocal coaches and mentors. Serabee was selected as a member of country singer, Blake Shelton's team, assisted by award-winning singer, Reba McEntire.

In 2022, Serabee released her album “Hummingbird Tea,” through the independent Louisiana-based record label, Rabadash Records. Since then Buras has had multiple releases through Rabadash Records including her album “That Woman,” (2023) and a number of singles such as “Mississippi Girl,” (2024) and “The Greatest Party of All,” (2025).

== Personal background ==
Serabee was born in Kiln, Mississippi, 45 minutes east of New Orleans. She is the youngest of five children born to Roland "R.J." and Charlotte Buras, who met each other in the 1960s, playing the clubs in New Orleans.

== Professional background ==
Serabee discovered her vocal talent and music abilities as a child, performing in her evangelist father's tent revivals. In addition to providing lead vocals, she also plays the drums, keyboards, and acoustic and steel guitar. By the time she was 12 years old, she was traveling throughout the southern United States, singing lead in her family's gospel band, Sera and the Blue Jays.

When her older siblings got married and started families of their own, the group disbanded. Serabee continued pursuing her music, serving as the choir director and worship leader at her father's church in Gulfport, Mississippi. As she grew older, she became restless and began exploring the area casinos, where she enjoyed hearing all kinds of music that were not the norm in her conservative upbringing. Before long, she was singing and playing piano with a new band, performing in casinos and clubs throughout the Gulf Coast.

In 2002, Serabee was introduced to Platinum and Grammy winning producer Gary Katz, whose professional background includes working with Steely Dan, Diana Ross, and Joe Cocker. Katz is a legendary producer and A&R professional, noted for signing Jim Croce, Rufus and Jimmy Buffett, as well as Graham Nash and David Crosby of Crosby, Stills, Nash, and Young. He was one of two people principally responsible for signing Prince, Dire Straits, and Rickie Lee Jones to the Warner Bros. label. Soon after they met, Katz began serving Serabee as creative mentor. By 2004, Serabee had two nationally released CDs, both produced by Gary Katz.

In 2003, Serabee released her self-titled debut album, which offered an urban pop experience, rooted in the sounds of the Deep South. Her sophomore offering was released in 2004, entitled Open On Sunday. The title track, "Open On Sunday", was co-produced and mixed by professional recording artist, Peter Gabriel of the progressive rock group, Genesis. The album presents a more soulful sound, delivered with a hint of urban rhythm and blues. These earlier releases, produced by Katz, defined Buras as an accomplished composer, talented vocalist, and skilled musician with vast commercial appeal.

In 2003, Serabee released her self-titled debut album, Sera Buras, produced by legendary producer and A&R man, Gary Katz. In 2004, she released her second album entitled, Open On Sunday. Both albums were produced and distributed for EMI through Aezra Records. The title track, "Open On Sunday", was co-produced and mixed by professional recording artist and producer, Peter Gabriel of the progressive rock group, Genesis.

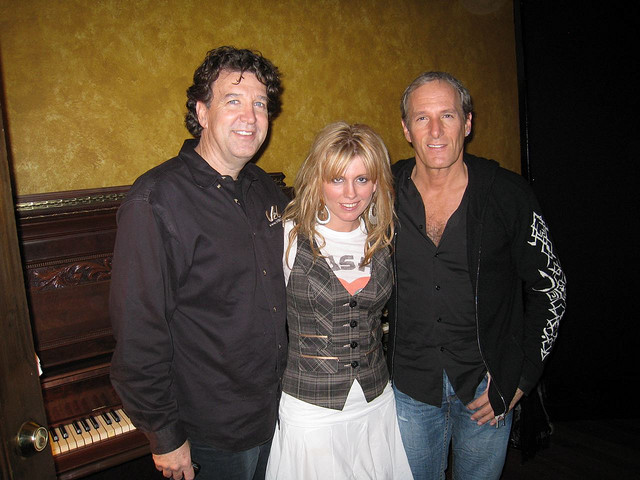
Serabee with Paul McCulloch and Michael Bolton, 2009

In 2005, Serabee wrote the song "Crazy Chick", which was recorded by singer Charlotte Church. It became a hit on the UK Singles Chart, reaching No. 2 on the UK Singles Top 75, where it remained for one week. The song ranked 40th on the 2005 UK Year End Singles Chart. Recorded on the Sony BMG label, the song was included on Church's fifth studio album Tissues and Issues. The song was listed for 30 weeks in four different charts, including the UK, Ireland, New Zealand, and Australia.

In 2009, Serabee, now credited as "Serabee", signed with Universal Republic. Her first release with the label, entitled Serabee, was released in November 2009.

In April 2011, Serabee became a contestant on the U.S. reality talent show The Voice, which airs on the NBC television network. The premise of the show includes pairing up widely undiscovered vocalists with highly successful recording artists, who serve as vocal coaches and mentors. Serabee was selected as a member of the team facilitated and developed by country singer, Blake Shelton, and assisted by award-winning singer, Reba McEntire. The eventual winner of the competition is awarded a cash prize of $100,000, along with a recording contract.

== Media appearances ==
The Voice

In April 2011, Serabee became a contestant on the U.S. reality singing competition, The Voice, which airs on the NBC television network. Her participation included a vocal audition to continue with the show, competing with 31 other contestants for $100,000, along with a recording contract.

The premise of the show includes pairing up widely undiscovered vocalists with four highly successful recording artists, who serve as vocal coaches. Professionals serving as coaches with the show include country singer Blake Shelton; Adam Levine of Maroon 5; pop singer and actress, Christina Aguilera;and pop singer Cee-Lo Green

The first round of the competition included blind auditions, during which, Buras performed the song, "Son of a Preacher Man". While she sang, the four coaches sat in swivel chairs with their backs turned, restricting their ability to view the performance. The coaches were able to listen to the vocalists and offer feedback and judgment, based solely on their talent, rather than image and appearance.

While the contestant was singing, if one or more of the coaches were impressed with what they heard and desired to include the vocalist as a member of their team, the coach hit a large button in front of them, which triggered the chair to swivel around, allowing the coach to face the contestant throughout the rest of the performance. This was followed by open dialogue and feedback between the contestant and the coaches to determine whose team the vocalist would join.

Serabee was chosen as a member of the team being developed by Blake Shelton, and assisted by Grammy Award-winning singer, Reba McEntire. The role of coach encompasses providing vocal development, along with guidance and support, leading to a successful career in the music industry.

During the second round of competition, the "Battles", each coach selected a song and paired two members of their team to sing a duet on the show. At the end of the duet, the coaches offered feedback and critique of both singers and their performance. This was followed by the coach deciding which of the two singers performed better, resulting in the opportunity to continue to the third round in pursuit of the ultimate prize.

Serabee competed in the third week of Battles, singing a duet with Dia Frampton. Both sang The Supremes song, "You Can't Hurry Love". Cee-Lo and Adam were split on their choice, while Christina could not decide between the two women, believing that it was an odd pairing. In the end, Blake chose Dia, sending her to the live show and ending Serabee's run on the show.

== Discography ==
=== Studio albums ===
- 2003 – Sera Buras (EMI/Aezra Records)
- 2004 – Open On Sundays (EMI/Aezra Records) Released – October 4, 2004
- 2007 – Sera Buras (EMI/Aezra Records)
1. "Just the Way You Are"
2. "Airplane Ride"
3. "Nickel in My Pocket"
4. "Karma"
5. "Shake It"
6. "Joseph"
7. "Funky Love"
8. "Sunshine"
9. "Hold Your Hand"
10. "Black Boots"
11. "It Doesn't Matter"
12. "Breakdown"
13. "Woman Under Cover"
14. "Tell Ya Baby"
15. "Maybe"
16. "Gandhi"
- 2009 – Serabee (Universal Republic) Released – November 10, 2009
1. "Down to Earth" – 4:05 minutes
2. "Tell Me" – 4:24 minutes
3. "Different World" – 4:04 minutes
4. "Driving Me Stupid" – 3:40 minutes
5. "The Rest of Me" – 3:40 minutes
6. "Whacked Out Chick" – 3:10 minutes
- 2022 - Hummingbird Tea (Rabadash Records) Released - October 14, 2022
1. “Bayou Baby” – 3:45 minutes
2. “Tennessee” – 4:30 minutes
3. “I’m Closed” – 3:35 minutes
4. “Drunk Woman’s Words” – 4:03 minutes
5. “Find Another Boyfriend” – 3:43 minutes
6. “I Need Saving Too” – 4:40 minutes
7. “Anything Like the Boy” – 4:25 minutes
8. “Hush Little Baby” – 4:20 minutes
9. “Loves to Love a Woman” – 3:45 minutes
10. “Burn” – 3:43 minutes
11. “Fair Weathered Man” – 4:50 minutes
12. “War and Peace” – 3:35 minutes
13. “Has Anybody Told You” – 3:44 minutes
14. “Moonchild” – 7:54 minutes
- 2022 - New Orleans [single] (Rabadash Records) December 16, 2022
- 2023 - Back to New Orleans [single] (Rabadash Records) February 17, 2023
- 2023 - That Woman (Rabadash Records) Released April 20, 2023
1. “That Woman” – 4:28 minutes
2. “Humble Pie” – 4:56 minutes
3. “Church On Sunday” – 4:19 minutes
4. “Try It Together” – 4:49 minutes
5. “She’s Crazy” – 5:07 minutes
6. “Half Naked” – 4:28 minutes
7. “Waste of Whiskey” – 5:37 minutes
8. “Break My Heart” – 4:02 minutes
9. “Make Me Wanna Stay” – 3:53 minutes
10. ‘Give Up” – 4:31 minutes
11. “Water Under The Bridge” – 4:16 minutes
12. “Top Floor” – 3:19 minutes
13. “Hard Pill” – 4:01 minutes
- 2023 - Bayou Christmas [single] (Rabadash Records) December 1, 2023
- 2024 - Mississippi Girl [single] (Rabadash Records) November 11, 2024

== Videography ==
- 2009 – "Driving Me Stupid"
- 2022 - "Bayou Baby"
- 2022 - "New Orleans"
- 2022 - "I'm Closed"
- 2023 - "Bayou Christmas"

== Collaborations ==
- Lukas Rossi
- Single – In 2008, Serabee contributed songs to the soundtrack of a documentary entitled Single, which was written, produced, and directed by Richard Atkinson and Jane Scandurra of Go Pictures and Films, LLC. The film includes a cast of singer-songwriters, comedians, and "real" people describing the difficulty in finding love and maintaining a lasting relationship.
- Cady McClain – Produced by George Petit, Serabee provides background vocals on McClain's 2006 album, "Blue Glitter Fish".
- Charlotte Church – Serabee wrote the song, "Crazy Chick", which was selected by Charlotte Church as one of the songs included on her 2005 Tissues and Issues album.
- Peter Gabriel – Gabriel co-produced and mixed the title track, "Open On Sunday", from Serabee's 2004 album, Open On Sundays.
- Gary Katz
- Doug Jernigan
