= Moodswing =

Moodswing or Moodswings may refer to:

- Mood swing, an extreme or sudden change of mood
- MoodSwing (Joshua Redman album), 1994
- Moodswing (Kacy Crowley album), 2003
- Moodswings (band), the musical duo of Grant Showbiz and James F.T. Hood, active from 1992 to the present
- "Moodswings (To Come at Me like That)", a single by Charlotte Church
- ”Moodswings” a song by 5 Seconds Of Summer from 5SOS5

== See also ==
- Mood swing (disambiguation)
