= Phantom Music =

Phantom Music Incorporated
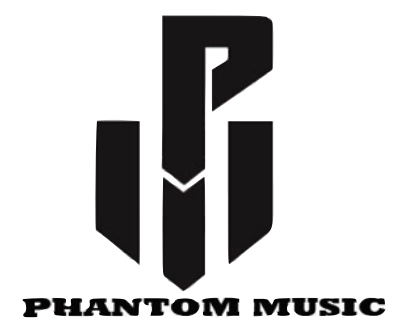
- Founded: 2009
- Founder: Kalenna Harper, Tony Vick
- Defunct: 2011
- Genre: Hiphop, R&B, Pop
- Country of origin: U.S.
- Location: Atlanta, Georgia

Phantom Music was an independent record label established by Kalenna Harper (former member of Dirty Money) and Tony Vick in 2009, and dissolved in 2011.
