= One (Charlotte Church EP) =

EP by Charlotte Church
- Released: 3 September 2012
- Recorded: Wales, UK
- Genre: Indie pop, alternative rock, folk rock
- Length: 12:50
- Label: Alligator Wine

Charlotte Church chronology
Back to Scratch (2010)	One (2012)	Two (2013)

Singles from One
- 1. "How Not to Be Surprised When You're a Ghost" Released: 3 August 2012

One is the first extended play by Welsh recording artist Charlotte Church. It is the first in a series of four EPs and marks another musical direction of Church, departing her pop sound that is heard in her last two albums Tissues and Issues and Back to Scratch. This marks her first alternative rock material. It was released on 3 September 2012 and is preceded by the lead single "How Not to Be Surprised When You're a Ghost". One and Two were combined for a US release on 12 March 2013. Church promoted One and Two in the US with her first North American performances in almost a decade. She appeared in New York City, Los Angeles, Toronto, and South by Southwest Festival. Her costumes for her North American concerts were designed by Zoe Howerska.

== Track listing ==
No.	Title	Length
1.	"The Rise"	2:20
2.	"Say It's True"	3:26
3.	"How Not to Be Surprised When You're a Ghost"	3:28
4.	"Beautiful Wreck"	3:36
