= Chamber of Diaries =

Mixtape by Kalenna Harper
- Released: June 13, 2012
- Recorded: 2011–2012
- Genres: Hip hop, R&B
- Producers: Ryan "Ryghteous" Tedder; Mel & Mus; D'Mile; Chizzy; Babygirl; First Born; Rodney Jerkins; Black The Beast; T-Minus; Honorable C.N.O.T.E; Cato; Charles "Cha Lo" Hester

Kalenna Harper chronology
Last Train to Paris (2010)	Chamber of Diaries (2012)

Singles from Chamber of Diaries
- 1. "Go to Work" Released: March 15, 2012; 2. "Feeling Good" Released: May 8, 2012; 3. "Love Rock" Released: July 1, 2012

Chamber of Diaries is the debut solo mixtape by American R&B artist Kalenna Harper, previously of Diddy Dirty Money fame, released on June 13, 2012. The mixtape's lead single, "Go to Work", was released on March 15, 2012.

== Background ==
Before going solo, Harper was a member of the R&B trio Diddy Dirty Money before they split in 2011. They released their debut album Last Train to Paris in 2010. The album follows Diddy's alter-ego as he travels from London to Paris to regain a lost love. It also introduces the world to Diddy's R&B/Hip-Hop collective, Dirty Money, a group consisting of Dawn Richards (formerly of Danity Kane) and singer-songwriter Kalenna Harper. Dirty Money perform on the album alongside a total of sixteen guest vocals, which include appearances from Grace Jones and Lil Wayne, amongst others. To reflect the couture concept of the album, Last Train to Paris also features vocal segues from designers and editors of the fashion world including Vogue editor-in-chief Anna Wintour and Tommy Hilfiger.

With executive producers Rodney Jerkins, Diddy, Mario Winans and Herve Pierre, Last Train to Paris is predominately hip hop, but incorporates elements of Eurodance, Italo disco and tech house. It marks Diddy's debut with Interscope Records after he moved his label Bad Boy from Atlantic Records in 2009. The album cover is a photograph at Centre Georges Pompidou (Paris, France) taken by Australian photographer Jarrod "Jrod" Kimber. Last Train to Paris was generally well received by critics who praised the addition of Richard and Harper to help Diddy innovate a new sound and produce some unique records.

The release was preceded by four singles "Angels", "Hello Good Morning", "Loving You No More" and "Coming Home", which received mixed success on the Billboard Hot 100. The latter has become the most successful, peaking at number twelve on the U.S. Hot 100 and top-five or top-ten in much of Europe. During its opening week Last Train to Paris outperformed expectations and debuted eight places higher than predicted at number seven on the Billboard 200. It sold 101,000 copies, compared to the 60,000-70,000 copies that Billboard had predicted it would sell. Diddy described Last Train to Paris as an "electro-hip-hop-soul funk" album which has been three years in the making. Diddy says the sound of this album was influenced "by being in the dance music world and doing stuff with Felix da Housecat, Erick Morillo, Deep Dish, DJ Hell and being in Ibiza and DC10." The arc will follow Diddy's character as he tours from London to Paris and finds the woman of his dreams - only to lose her, find her, lose her again and find her a final time. The records were conceptualised from Diddy's comments to his producers. He told Alex da Kid (who produced "Coming Home") "I want a beat that makes me feel like a white man in a basement in Atlanta." Diddy said that "most of the producers he worked with, he's been friends with for a long time. The records came together by hanging out with them, taking them to parties and showing them movies". In an interview with MTV News Diddy said "One of the things [Dirty Money] trying to represent is emotion... Not being afraid to show emotion on record. A lot of records out right now — no disrespect to them, but they're all surface. It's about what people have or a dance. All our records are gonna be about love, feelings and emotion. Last Train to Paris is a love story and the most vulnerable album I've ever been involved in. It's raw emotion — you get a feeling, a vibe." Diddy also released an application for the iPhone that integrates his social networking site and Twitter feed. A short film will also accompany the album. Rap producer Bangladesh, also confirmed that he would be producing for the album. According to New York magazine, the album was "assembled from 60 or so songs. The genesis of Last Train to Paris is full of odd stories involving our hero, ensconced in a darkened studio, barking batty ideas to his production team."

== Release and reception ==
Chamber of Diaries was released on February 13, 2012. The mixtapes's lead single, "Go to Work", was released on November 14, 2011.

One website commented on the mixtape: "Former Dirty Money member Kalenna released a new mixtape titled Chamber of Diaries. Hosted by DJ Cash and executive produced by Kalenna, Tony Vick, Trick Bizness and Shakesphere, this sound is different from what I've normally heard from female artists today. Whether it's showing out in the club ("6000 Sistas"), being down for the man that she loves ("S on My Chest"), flipping one of Drake's tracks ("The Motto"), or the day after a wild night ("The Morning After"), Kalenna separates herself from the pack. With production from Darkchild, Black Da Beast, D'Mile and others, this mixtape is worth the listen."

== Track listing ==
No.	Title	Producer(s)	Length
1.	"One Heart At A Time"	Ryan "Ryghteous" Tedder; Chizzy	1:39
2.	"Feeling Good"	Tedder; Chizzy	3:40
3.	"Ladder"	D'Mile	4:16
4.	"The Motto (Freestyle)"	T-Minus	3:46
5.	"S on My Chest" (featuring Atozzio Towns)	Lashaunda "Babygirl" Carr; Honorable C.N.O.T.E	3:58
6.	"Get to Know Me (Interlude)"		2:24
7.	"Matte Black Truck"	D'Mile	3:50
8.	"Put It In The Bag"	Cato	3:17
9.	"6000 Sistas"	Charles "Cha Lo" Hester	3:36
10.	"Kalenna (Interlude)"		1:24
11.	"Love Rock" (featuring Jarren Benton & L.Jenkins)	D'Mile	4:49
12.	"Pain + Alcohol" (featuring Dee Simms)	Carr	3:40
13.	"Poison" (featuring Crystal Nicole)	Carr; D'Mile	3:56
14.	"The Morning After"	Mel & Mus	1:34
15.	"Party & Bullshit" (featuring Lil Playy)	Rodney Jerkins	3:58
16.	"C.O.D. (Outro)"		1:34
17.	"Go To Work (Remix)" (featuring Sterling Simms & Wayne Wonder)	First Born; Black The Beast	5:19
18.	"Go To Work"	First Born; Black The Beast	3:22
Total length:			56:02

== Release dates ==
- Worldwide: February 14, 2012
