= Enchantment (Charlotte Church album) =

Studio album by Charlotte Church
- Released: 9 October 2001
- Recorded: 2001
- Genre: Crossover; Swing; Pop; Broadway
- Label: Columbia

Charlotte Church chronology
Dream a Dream (2000)	Enchantment (2001)	Prelude: The Best of Charlotte Church (2002)

Professional ratings
Review scores
Source	Rating
Allmusic	2.5/5 stars
Q	3/5 stars

Enchantment is the fourth studio album featuring the voice of 15-year-old soprano Charlotte Church, released in 2001.

Enchantment was Church's final classical studio album with original material. Her next album, Prelude: The Best of Charlotte Church, is a "best of" collection. She subsequently ended her classical genre career and moved on to the pop genre with Tissues and Issues, her final album with Sony Music.

== Track listing ==
1. "Tonight" (from West Side Story)
2. "Carrickfergus" (folk)
3. "Habañera" (Bizet)
4. "Bali Ha'i" (Rodgers and Hammerstein)
5. "Papa, Can You Hear Me?" (from Yentl)
6. "The Flower Duet" (Delibes)
7. "The Little Horses" (folk)
8. "From My First Moment" (Gymnopédie No. 1)
9. "The Water Is Wide" (folk)
10. "Can't Help Lovin' Dat Man" (from Show Boat)
11. "The Laughing Song" (from Die Fledermaus)
12. "If I Loved You" (Rodgers and Hammerstein)
13. "A Bit of Earth" (from The Secret Garden)
14. "Somewhere" (from West Side Story)
15. "The Prayer", with Josh Groban (from Quest for Camelot)
16. "It's the Heart That Matters Most"

Note: Church covered the "Laughing Song" completely in English.

== Charts ==
=== Weekly charts ===
Chart (2001)	Peak position
Dutch Albums (Album Top 100)	58
Irish Albums (IRMA)	27
New Zealand Albums (RMNZ)	19
Scottish Albums (OCC)	35
UK Albums (OCC)	24
US Billboard 200	15
US Top Classical Albums (Billboard)	1

=== Year-end charts ===
Year-end chart performance for Enchantment by Charlotte Church
Chart (2001)	Position
Canadian Albums (Nielsen SoundScan)	120
UK Albums (OCC)	136
Chart (2002)	Position
US Billboard 200	159

== Release history ==
Region	Date
United States	9 October 2001
United Kingdom	22 October 2001

== Certifications ==
Country	Certification
Great Britain	Gold
America	Gold
Canada	Gold
Hong Kong	Gold
