= Shake My =

Single by Three 6 Mafia featuring Kalenna

from the album Laws of Power
- Released: September 8, 2009
- Recorded: 2009
- Genre: Hip-hop; R&B
- Length: 3:19
- Label: Columbia, Sony, Hypnotize Minds
- Songwriter(s): Paul Beauregard, Kalenna Harper, Jordan Houston, Osinachi Nwaneri, Armando Pérez
- Producer(s): Rodney "Darkchild" Jerkins, Osinachi, JMIKE

Three 6 Mafia featuring Kalenna singles chronology
"That's Right" (2008)	"Shake My" (2009)	"Lil Freak (Ugh, Ugh, Ugh)" (2009)

Music video
- "Three 6 Mafia - Shake My (Official Video) ft. Kalenna" on YouTube

"Shake My" (explicitly Shake My Ass) is the official first single by Three 6 Mafia from their planned tenth studio album Laws of Power, which never got released. It features Kalenna of Diddy's group Dirty Money and Pitbull (uncredited) and was produced by Rodney "Darkchild" Jerkins, making it one of the handful of Three 6 Mafia singles not produced by them.

== Charts ==
Chart (2009)	Peak position
US Billboard Hot 100	75
US Hot Rap Songs (Billboard)	22
US Rhythmic (Billboard)	18
