= Mood swing (disambiguation) =

A mood swing is a change in mood.

Mood Swing or Mood Swings may also refer to:

== Albums ==
- Mood Swing (The Nails album), 1984
- Mood Swings (Harem Scarem album), 1993
- Mood Swings (Koby Israelite album), 2005
- Mood Swings (Small Sins album), 2007
- Mood Swings, by Marcus King, 2024

== Songs ==
- "Mood Swings" (A Boogie wit da Hoodie song), 2019
- "Mood Swings" (Pop Smoke song), 2020
- "Mood Swings" (Tove Styrke song), 2021

== See also ==
- Moodswing (disambiguation)
