= Mood music (disambiguation) =

Mood music is easy listening music.

Mood music may also refer to:

- Beautiful music
- Exotica
- Light music
- Lounge music
- Elevator music
- Music provided by Mood Media, Corporation
- Mood Music (play), a 2018 play by Joe Penhall

== See also ==
- Mood Muzik (disambiguation)
- Background music
- Production music
