= Four (Charlotte Church EP) =

EP by Charlotte Church
- Released: 10 March 2014
- Recorded: Wales, UK
- Genre: Indie pop, alternative rock, math rock
- Length: 25:12
- Label: Alligator Wine

Charlotte Church chronology
Three (2013)	Four (2014)

Singles from Four
- 1. "Little Movements" Released: 15 March 2014

Professional ratings
Review scores
Source	Rating
The Line of Best Fit	8/10 stars

Four is the fourth extended play by Welsh recording artist Charlotte Church. It is the last in a series of four EPs released by Church. Her fourth alternative rock material, it was released on 10 March 2014 and preceded by the lead single "Little Movements".

== Track listing ==
No.	Title	Length
1.	"Entanglement"	3:03
2.	"Love Alone"	4:09
3.	"Little Movements"	3:14
4.	"Death and Mathematics"	5:37
5.	"Hood Shade"	4:18
6.	"Love"	4:51
