= Even God Can't Change the Past =

Single by Charlotte Church

from the album Tissues and Issues
- B-side: "Better Day", "The Man with the Child in His Eyes"
- Released: 12 December 2005
- Genre: Pop; soul
- Length: 3:07
- Label: Sony BMG
- Songwriters: Rick Nowels; George O'Dowd; John Themis
- Producer: David Fortman

Charlotte Church singles chronology
"Call My Name" (2005)	"Even God Can't Change the Past" (2005)	"Moodswings (To Come at Me like That)" (2006)

"Even God Can't Change the Past" (titled "Even God" on the album) is a song by Welsh recording artist Charlotte Church, released as the third single from her fifth studio album Tissues and Issues (2005). The song was written by Rick Nowels, George O'Dowd (Boy George) and John Themis, and produced by David Fortman. Released on 12 December 2005, it peaked at number 17 on the UK Singles Chart, becoming Church's fourth top 20 single.

== Background ==
The song was originally titled "Who's Loving Who" and recorded by Maria Nayler and released in 1998 on a sampler CD by Deconstruction Records. This version was also intended to be released on Nayler's album around this time, but went unreleased until 2023 when it was made available digitally.

Church's version was recorded in early 2005. It was produced by David Fortman and mixed by Steve Fitzmaurice and assisted by Stephen Sedgwick. Throughout the song, a piano is being played by David Campbell.

== Chart performance ==
"Even God" was released as a CD single on 12 December 2005 in the United Kingdom under the longer title "Even God Can't Change the Past". The song debuted and peaked at number 17 on the UK Singles Chart on 17 December. It lasted seven weeks on the chart and became Church's fourth top 20 single on that chart. It also charted on the Irish Singles Chart, where it peaked at number 38.

== Track listings ==
CD 1
No.	Title	Writer(s)	Length
1.	"Even God Can't Change the Past"	Rick Nowels; George O'Dowd; John Themis	3:07
2.	"Better Day"		4:07

CD 2
No.	Title	Writer(s)	Length
1.	"Even God Can't Change the Past" (album version)	Rick Nowels; George O'Dowd; John Themis	4:08
2.	"The Man with the Child in His Eyes" (Kate Bush cover)	Bush	2:50
3.	"Call My Name" (Bobby Blanco/Miki Moto mix)	Charlotte Church; Wayne Hector; Eg White	2:58

UK iTunes
No.	Title	Writer(s)	Length
1.	"Even God Can't Change the Past" (AOL Sessions)	Rick Nowels; George O'Dowd; John Themis	3:21

== Charts ==
Chart (2005)	Peak position
Irish Singles Chart	38
UK Singles Chart (OCC)	17
