= Mood (Eva song) =

Single by Eva

from the album Queen
- Released: 26 October 2018
- Genre: Electropop; R&B
- Length: 3:03
- Songwriters: Sabrina Habhab; Sany San Beats
- Producers: Sabrina Habhab; Sany San Beats

Eva singles chronology
"Mood" (2018)	"On Fleek" (2019)

"Mood" is a 2018 song by the French singer Eva.

== Charts ==
Chart (2018)	Peak position
Belgium (Ultratip Wallonia)	14
France (SNEP)	17

== Certifications ==
Region	Certification	Certified units/sales
France (SNEP)	Platinum	200,000^{‡}
^{‡} Sales+streaming figures based on certification alone.
