= Charlotte Church (album) =

Studio album by Charlotte Church
- Released: 5 November 1999
- Recorded: 1999
- Genre: Crossover
- Label: Sony Classical (U.S.)

Charlotte Church chronology
Voice of an Angel (1998)	Charlotte Church (1999)	Dream a Dream (2000)

Charlotte Church is the second album by the Welsh soprano Charlotte Church, who was 13 years old in November 1999 when the album was released by Sony Classical. The song “Just Wave Hello” was prominently featured in the global campaign for the Ford Motor Company, and Church’s image was used to promote their lineup.

== Track listing ==
1. "Just Wave Hello"
2. "La Pastorella" from Rossini's Soirées musicales
3. "Barcarolle" from The Tales of Hoffmann
4. "O mio babbino caro" from Gianni Schicchi
5. "Lascia ch'io pianga" from Rinaldo
6. "Guide Me, Oh Thou Great Redeemer" ("Cwm Rhondda")
7. "The Holy City"
8. "Plaisir d'amour"
9. "Summertime" from Porgy and Bess
10. "Ah! je ris de me voir si belle" ("The Jewel Song") from Faust
11. "Voi che sapete" (Tell me what love is) from The Marriage of Figaro
12. "She Moved Through the Fair"
13. "Songs My Mother Taught Me"
14. "If Thou Art Near"
15. "The Last Rose of Summer"
16. "Men of Harlech"
17. "Lullaby" (Roses whisper goodnight)

== Charts ==
=== Weekly charts ===
Chart (1999–2000)	Peak position
Australian Albums (ARIA)	41
Dutch Albums (Album Top 100)	12
German Albums (Offizielle Top 100)	84
New Zealand Albums (RMNZ)	16
Swedish Albums (Sverigetopplistan)	44
Swiss Albums (Schweizer Hitparade)	65
UK Albums (Official Charts)	8
US Billboard 200	40

=== Year-end charts ===
Chart (1999)	Position
Australian Albums (ARIA)	85
UK Albums (OCC)	36
Chart (2000)	Position
Canadian Albums (Nielsen SoundScan)	188
US Billboard 200	119

== Certifications ==
Country	Certification
United Kingdom	Platinum
United States	Platinum
Canada	Platinum
Australia	Gold
Hong Kong	Platinum
