= The Opera Song (Brave New World) =

2003 single by Jurgen Vries and CMC

Single by Jurgen Vries and CMC
- Released: 20 January 2003
- Length: 3:35
- Label: Direction
- Songwriters: Rohan Heath; Danny Kirsch; Darren Tate
- Producer: Darren Tate

Jurgen Vries singles chronology
"The Theme" (2002)	"The Opera Song (Brave New World)" (2003)	"Destination" (2003)

Charlotte Church singles chronology
"Just Wave Hello" (1999)	"The Opera Song (Brave New World)" (2003)	"Crazy Chick" (2005)

"The Opera Song (Brave New World)" is a song by British record producer Jurgen Vries featuring vocals from Welsh singer Charlotte Church. Church was credited as CMC because her label was concerned about the press' reaction to the change in her musical direction. Released on 20 January 2003, the song reached number three on the UK Singles Chart the same month and was the 70th-best-selling single of the year there. The single also reached number 25 in Ireland and number 62 in Australia.

== Music video ==
The music video for the song was animated and saw a computer-animated version of Charlotte Church running through a futuristic town to meet up with Jurgen Vries.

== Track listings ==
UK CD1

1. "The Opera Song (Brave New World)" (radio edit)
2. "The Opera Song (Brave New World)" (extended mix)

UK CD2

1. "The Opera Song (Brave New World)" (radio edit)
2. "The Opera Song (Brave New World)" (dub mix)
3. "The Opera Song (Brave New World)" (Darren Tate's classical rework)
4. "The Opera Song (Brave New World)" (enhanced CD video)

UK 12-inch single

A. "The Opera Song (Brave New World)" (extended mix)
B. "The Opera Song (Brave New World)" (dub)

Australian CD single

1. "The Opera Song (Brave New World)" (radio edit)
2. "The Opera Song (Brave New World)" (Darren Tate's classical rework)
3. "The Opera Song (Brave New World)" (extended mix)
4. "The Opera Song (Brave New World)" (Magik Muzik mix)

== Charts ==
=== Weekly charts ===
Chart (2003)	Peak position
Australia (ARIA)	62
Europe (Eurochart Hot 100)	13
Ireland (IRMA)	25
Ireland Dance (IRMA)	2
Scotland Singles (OCC)	2
UK Singles (OCC)	3
UK Dance (OCC)	3

=== Year-end charts ===
Chart (2003)	Position
UK Singles (OCC)	70

== Release history ==
Region	Date	Format(s)	Label(s)	Ref.
United Kingdom	20 January 2003	12-inch vinyl; CD	Direction	
Australia	30 June 2003	CD	Universal Dance	
