= Dream a Dream =

Studio album by Charlotte Church
- Released: 17 October 2000
- Recorded: 2000
- Genres: Crossover, Christmas carol
- Label: Sony Classical (U.S.)

Charlotte Church chronology
Charlotte Church (1999)	Dream a Dream (2000)	Enchantment (2001)

Professional ratings
Review scores
Source	Rating
Allmusic	3/5 stars

Dream a Dream is the third album by Welsh soprano Charlotte Church, released in 2000. The album is principally a collection of Christmas carols but also includes the non-Christmas title track "Dream a Dream", Church's first foray into a more pop-influenced genre, composed by James Shearman and Simon Greenaway based on the melody from Fauré's "Pavane" with lyrics by Sam Babenia.

Dream a Dream was also the biggest-selling holiday album of 2000 in the United States with sales of 1,077,000 according to Nielsen/SoundScan. On 6 December 2000, Dream a Dream was certified platinum by the Recording Industry Association of America for shipments of one million copies in the U.S. By 5 December 2008, the album had accumulated total sales of 1,630,000 copies in the U.S. according to SoundScan.

== Track listing ==
=== United Kingdom track listing ===
The version released in the United Kingdom.

1. "Dream a Dream" (with Billy Gilman)
2. "O Come, All Ye Faithful"
3. "Little Drummer Boy"
4. "The First Noel"
5. "Mary's Boy Child"
6. "Ding Dong Merrily on High"
7. "Winter Wonderland"
8. "The Christmas Song"
9. "Hark! The Herald Angels Sing"
10. "The Coventry Carol (Lully Lullay)"
11. "Joy to the World"
12. "When a Child Is Born"
13. "What Child Is This?"
14. "God Rest Ye Merry, Gentlemen"
15. "Draw Tua Bethlehem"
16. "Ave Maria"
17. "Gabriel's Message"
18. "O Holy Night"
19. "Lo How A Rose E'er Blooming"
20. "Silent Night"

=== United States track listing ===
The version released in the United States. (Excluding "4. The First Noel" from the UK version.)

1. "Dream a Dream" – 3:54 (with Billy Gilman)
2. "O Come, All Ye Faithful" – 3:21
3. "Little Drummer Boy" – 2:57
4. "Mary's Boy Child" – 3:31
5. "Ding Dong Merrily on High" – 2:18
6. "Winter Wonderland" – 3:03
7. "The Christmas Song" – 3:29
8. "Hark! The Herald Angels Sing" – 3:17
9. "The Coventry Carol (Lully Lullay)" – 2:32
10. "Joy to the World" – 2:12
11. "When a Child Is Born" – 2:29
12. "What Child Is This?" – 2:46
13. "God Rest Ye Merry, Gentlemen" – 2:00
14. "Draw Tua Bethlehem" – 3:37
15. "Ave Maria" – 2:50
16. "Gabriel's Message" – 2:43
17. "O Holy Night" – 4:22
18. "Lo! How a Rose E'er Blooming" – 2:32
19. "Silent Night" – 3:47

=== Target Exclusive Special Edition track listing ===
The version exclusively available in Target discount stores.

1. "Dream a Dream" (with Billy Gilman)
2. "O Come, All Ye Faithful"
3. "Little Drummer Boy"
4. "The First Noel"
5. "Mary's Boy Child"
6. "Ding Dong Merrily on High"
7. "Winter Wonderland"
8. "The Christmas Song"
9. "Hark! The Herald Angels Sing"
10. "The Coventry Carol (Lully Lullay)"
11. "Joy to the World"
12. "When a Child Is Born"
13. "What Child Is This?"
14. "God Rest Ye Merry, Gentlemen"
15. "Draw Tua Bethlehem"
16. "Ave Maria"
17. "Gabriel's Message"
18. "O Tannenbaum"
19. "O Holy Night"
20. "Lo How A Rose E'er Blooming"
21. "Silent Night"

== Personnel ==
- Track 1 ("Dream a Dream"): Simon Hale – vocal and string arrangements

== Charts ==
=== Weekly charts ===
Chart (2000)	Peak position
Canadian Albums (Billboard)	15
Dutch Albums (Album Top 100)	24
Irish Albums (IRMA)	33
Scottish Albums (Official Charts)	36
UK Albums (Official Charts)	30
US Billboard 200	7

=== Year-end charts ===
Chart (2000)	Position
Canadian Albums (Nielsen SoundScan)	87
UK Albums (OCC)	90
Chart (2001)	Position
US Billboard 200	92

== Certifications ==
Country	Certification
United Kingdom	Gold
United States	Platinum
Canada	Gold
Hong Kong	Gold

== Release history ==
Region	Date
United States	17 October 2000
United Kingdom	20 November 2000

== See also ==
- List of Billboard Top Holiday Albums number ones of the 2000s
