= Mood Ring (disambiguation) =

A mood ring is a type of ring that changes colors based upon the temperature of the finger of the wearer.

Mood Ring may also refer to:

== Albums and EPs ==
- Mood Ring, by Holly Hebe, 2026, or the title track
- Mood Ring, by Hot Flash Heat Wave, 2019
- Mood Ring, by Joan Shelley, 2024
- Mood Ring, by Kallitechnis, 2024
- Mood Ring, by Kississippi, 2021
- Mood Ring, by SadBoi, 2017
- Mood Ring, by the Hardship Post, 1993
- Moodring, 2003 album by Mýa

== Songs ==
- "Mood Ring" (Britney Spears song), 2020
- "Mood Ring" (Lorde song), 2021
- "Mood Ring", by Alison Blue from Out of the Blue, 1998
- "Mood Ring", by Cannons, 2016
- "Mood Ring", by Clayton Bellamy from Everyone's a Dreamer, 2012
- "Mood Ring", by Deborah Harry from Debravation, 1993
- "Mood Ring", by Kira Kosarin, 2022
- "Mood Ring", by Maddie & Tae, 2021
- "Mood Ring", by Mötley Crüe from Supersonic and Demonic Relics, 1999
- "Mood Ring", unreleased track by SZA

== See also ==
- Mood Rings (band), American alternative rock band
- "Mood Rings", by Relient K from the 2003 album Two Lefts Don't Make a Right...but Three Do
