= Call My Name (Charlotte Church song) =

2005 single by Charlotte Church

Single by Charlotte Church

from the album Tissues and Issues
- B-side: "Unfaithful"
- Released: 26 September 2005
- Length: 3:00
- Label: Sony BMG
- Songwriters: Charlotte Church; Wayne Hector; Eg White
- Producers: Fitzgerald Scott; Eg White

Charlotte Church singles chronology
"Crazy Chick" (2005)	"Call My Name" (2005)	"Even God Can't Change the Past" (2005)

"Call My Name" is a song by Welsh singer Charlotte Church from her fifth studio album, Tissues and Issues (2005). The song was released as the album's second single on 26 September 2005. It was co-written by Church, Wayne Hector and Eg White; with White producing it alongside Fitzgerald Scott.

== Track listings ==
CD1 single

No.	Title	Writer(s)	Notes	Length
1.	"Call My Name"	Charlotte Church; Wayne Hector; Eg White		3:00
2.	"Let Me Love You" (Radio 1 Live Lounge)	Shaffer Smith; Kameron Houff; Scott Storch	Mario cover	2:53

CD2 single / Australian CD single

No.	Title	Writer(s)	Length
1.	"Call My Name"	Charlotte Church; Wayne Hector; Eg White	3:00
2.	"Call My Name" (Steve Mac's Classic Vocal Remix)	Church; Hector; White	3:32
3.	"Unfaithful"		3:34
4.	"Call My Name" (music video)		3:00

UK 12" single

All tracks are written by Charlotte Church, Wayne Hector and Eg White.

No.	Title	Length
1.	"Call My Name" (Steve Mac's Classic Vocal Remix)
2.	"Call My Name" (Kardinal Beats Remix)
3.	"Call My Name" (Kardinal Beats Instrumental Remix)

== Credits and personnel ==
Credits adapted from the liner notes of Tissues and Issues.

- Charlotte Church – lead vocals, songwriting
- Eg White – songwriting, production, drums, percussion, bass synths, guitars, keyboards
- Pete Davis – drums, keyboards
- Wayne Hector – background vocals
- Fitzgerald Scott - production
- Yvonne John-Lewis – background vocals
- Marion Powell – background vocals
- Steve Fitzmaurice – audio engineering
- Stephen Sedgewick – audio engineering

== Charts ==
=== Weekly charts ===
Chart (2005)	Peak position
Ireland (IRMA)	16
UK Singles (Official Charts)	10
Chart (2006)	Peak position
Australia (ARIA)	60
