= Back to Scratch =

Studio album by Charlotte Church
- Released: 25 October 2010
- Recorded: 2010
- Genre: Pop, alternative
- Length: 50:50
- Label: Dooby Records
- Producer: Martin Terefe; Sacha Skarbek

Charlotte Church chronology
Tissues and Issues (2005)	Back to Scratch (2010)	ONE (2012)

Singles from Back to Scratch
- 1. "Back to Scratch" Released: 19 September 2010; 2. "Logical World" Released: 28 November 2010; 3. "Snow" Released: 11 April 2011

Professional ratings
Review scores
Source	Rating
AllMusic	3/5 stars
Daily Express	(3/5)
The Independent	(Positive)
Mojo	3/5 stars
Q	3/5 stars
Uncut	3/5 stars

Back to Scratch is the sixth studio album from Welsh singer-songwriter Charlotte Church. The album was released on 25 October 2010, five years after the release of Church's fifth studio album Tissues and Issues. The album has been described by Church as having a "new different sound but also one that goes with my voice", Church has also described the album as more mature and as having a more "quirky" vibe than her previous album. The album was preceded by the lead single and title track "Back to Scratch" on 19 September 2010, which was originally written about a relative but which Church has recently described as being more relevant to her own split from former boyfriend Gavin Henson. The 2010 album was her first release on her own label Dooby Records after signing a $3m investment deal with all her previous albums being released on longtime label Sony Music. The song "Ruby" is a cover of Camille's song of the same name, written by Euston Jones and taken from her debut album Le Sac des Filles. A US release was planned for 2011, but was cancelled when Church severed her relationship with her label.

== Track listing ==
No.	Title	Writer(s)	Length
1.	"Back to Scratch"	Charlotte Church; Jonathan Powell	3:34
2.	"We Were Young"	Church; Powell	3:08
3.	"Ruby" (Camille cover)	Euston Jones	2:15
4.	"Unravelling"	Church; Luke Laird; Barry Dean	3:45
5.	"Logical World"	Church; Powell; Martin Terefe; Sacha Skarbek	2:51
6.	"Suitcase"	Church; Laird; Dean	3:04
7.	"The Actors"	Church; Powell	3:29
8.	"The Story of Us"	Church; Laird; Dean	3:51
9.	"Don't Think About It"	Colum Regan	2:52
10.	"Cup of the Sun"	Church; Powell	1:47
11.	"Snow"	Powell	5:02
12.	"Love Drunk"	Church; Patrick Davis	3:20
13.	"Honestly"	Church; Powell	8:35
14.	"River" (Joni Mitchell cover (hidden track))	Mitchell	4:02
15.	"Bang Bang" (iTunes bonus track)	Sonny Bono	3:29
16.	"My Boy" (Amazon UK bonus track)		3:31

== Charts ==
The album entered the official UK Top 75 album chart at Number 23 on 31 October 2010. The following week it dropped 42 places to Number 65.

Chart (2010)	Peak position
UK Albums Chart	23

== Release history ==
Region	Date	Label	Format
United Kingdom	25 October 2010	Dooby Records	CD, digital Download
Ireland	1 November 2010	Dooby Records	CD, digital Download
