= Two (Charlotte Church EP) =

EP by Charlotte Church
- Released: 4 March 2013
- Recorded: Wales, UK
- Genre: Indie pop, alternative rock, gothic rock
- Length: 19:11
- Label: Alligator Wine

Charlotte Church chronology
One (2012)	Two (2013)	Three (2013)

Singles from Two
- 1. "Glitterbombed" Released: 20 December 2012; 2. "Lasts, or Eschaton" Released: 26 April 2013

Two is the second extended play by Welsh recording artist Charlotte Church. It is the second in a series of four EPs released by Church. Her second alternative rock material, it was released on 4 March 2013 and is preceded by two singles "Glitterbombed" and "Lasts, or Eschaton".

== Track listing ==
No.	Title	Length
1.	"Glitterbombed"	5:24
2.	"Breach of the Peace"	3:21
3.	"The Mistress"	1:24
4.	"Nerve"	4:31
5.	"Lasts, or Eschaton"	4:31
