= Three (Charlotte Church EP) =

EP by Charlotte Church
- Released: 19 August 2013
- Recorded: Wales, UK
- Genre: Indie pop, alternative rock, post-rock
- Length: 25:47
- Label: Alligator Wine

Charlotte Church chronology
Two (2013)	Three (2013)	Four (2014)

Singles from Three
- 1. "I Can Dream" Released: 15 July 2013; 2. "Water Tower" Released: 9 August 2013

Professional ratings
Review scores
Source	Rating
The Line of Best Fit	7/10 stars

Three is the third EP by Welsh recording artist Charlotte Church. It is the third in a series of four EPs released by Church. Her third alternative rock material, it was released on 19 August 2013 and preceded by two singles "I Can Dream" and "Water Tower".

== Track listing ==
No.	Title	Length
1.	"Sparrow"	3:16
2.	"Remains"	1:42
3.	"Like a Fool"	5:33
4.	"Magician's Assistant"	5:03
5.	"House Upon the Sea"	3:05
6.	"I Can Dream"	3:49
7.	"Water Tower"	3:19
