= Mood Muzik =

Mood Muzik may refer to:

- Mood Muzik: The Worst of Joe Budden, a mixtape by rapper Joe Budden (2004)
- Mood Muzik 2: Can It Get Any Worse?, a mixtape by Joe Budden (2005)
- Mood Muzik 3: For Better or For Worse, a mixtape by Joe Budden (2007)
- Mood Muzik 3: The Album, an album by rapper Joe Budden (2008)
- Mood Muzik 3.5, a mixtape by Joe Budden (2007)
- Mood Muzik 4: A Turn 4 the Worst, a mixtape by Joe Budden (2010)

== See also ==
- Mood music (disambiguation)
