= Mood Indigo (disambiguation) =

"Mood Indigo" is a song by Duke Ellington.

Mood Indigo may also refer to:

- Mood Indigo (album), a 1989 album by jazz saxophonist Frank Morgan
- Mood Indigo (festival), annual cultural festival of the Indian Institute of Technology Bombay
- Froth on the Daydream, a novel by Boris Vian, also published in English as Mood Indigo or Foam of the Daze
- Mood Indigo (film), a 2013 film adaptation of the novel, directed by Michel Gondry
- "Mood Indigo", a single by the South Korean band Cheeze
- "Mood Indigo", a song by Dutch singer-songwriter Anouk

== See also ==
- Moog Indigo, a 1970 album by Jean-Jacques Perrey
