= Voice of an Angel =

Studio album by Charlotte Church
- Released: 9 November 1998
- Recorded: 1998
- Genre: Crossover
- Label: Sony Classical (U.S.)

Charlotte Church chronology
Voice of an Angel (1998)	Charlotte Church (1999)

Professional ratings
Review scores
Source	Rating
AllMusic	3/5 stars
Entertainment Weekly	C

Voice of an Angel is the debut studio album by the Welsh singer-songwriter and actor Charlotte Church. It was released on 9 November 1998, by Sony Music. The album sold millions of copies, and made Church the youngest artist in history with a number 1 album on the British classical crossover charts. It is a collection of arias, sacred songs and traditional pieces.

== Track listing ==
Voice of an Angel track listing
No.	Title	Writer(s)	Length
1.	"Pie Jesu"	Andrew Lloyd Webber	3:29
2.	"Panis angelicus"	César Franck	4:13
3.	"In Trutina"	Carl Orff	2:06
4.	"The Lord's Prayer"	Albert Hay Malotte	2:56
5.	"Jerusalem"	Hubert Parry, William Blake	2:17
6.	"Ave Maria (Funeral for a Friend)"	Elton John, Vladimir Vavilov (misattributed to Giulio Caccini)	4:14
7.	"Psalm 23"	Colin Mawby	2:45
8.	"I Vow to Thee, My Country"	Gustav Holst, Cecil Spring Rice	3:57
9.	"Danny Boy"	[traditional]	2:46
10.	"My Lagan Love"	[traditional]	3:16
11.	"Suo Gân"	[traditional]	3:15
12.	"A Lullaby"	Hamilton Harty	3:00
13.	"Amazing Grace"	[traditional]	2:47
14.	"Y Gylfinir"	Dilys Elwyn-Edwards	2:18
15.	"Tylluanod"	Elwyn-Edwards	2:43
16.	"Mae Hiraeth Yn y Môr"	Elwyn-Edwards	2:43
17.	"When at Night I Go to Sleep"	Engelbert Humperdinck	2:52

Note: Sian Edwards conducted the Orchestra and Chorus of Welsh National Opera, with Meinir Huelyn on harp.

== Charts and certifications ==
=== Weekly charts ===
Chart (1998–99)	Peak position
Australian Albums (ARIA)	22
Belgian Albums (Ultratop Flanders)	26
French Albums (SNEP)	49
German Albums (Offizielle Top 100)	51
Dutch Albums (Album Top 100)	15
New Zealand Albums (RMNZ)	33
Swiss Albums (Schweizer Hitparade)	42
UK Albums (OCC)	4
US Billboard 200	28
US Top Classical Albums (Billboard)	1

=== Year-end charts ===
Chart (1998)	Position
UK Albums (OCC)	28

Chart (1999)	Position
Dutch Albums (Album Top 100)	84
US Billboard 200	128

Chart (2000)	Position
Canadian Albums (Nielsen SoundScan)	144

=== Certifications ===
Region	Certification	Certified units/sales
Australia (ARIA)	Platinum	70,000^{^}
Canada (Music Canada)	Platinum	100,000^{^}
United Kingdom (BPI)	2× Platinum	600,000^{^}
United States (RIAA)	2× Platinum	2,000,000^{^}
^{^} Shipments figures based on certification alone.

== Release history ==
Country	Release date
United Kingdom	9 November 1998
United States	16 March 1999
