= Prelude: The Best of Charlotte Church =

Greatest hits album by Charlotte Church
- Released: 25 November 2002
- Recorded: 1998 – 2002
- Genre: Crossover; Swing; Pop; Broadway
- Length: 60:49
- Label: Columbia
- Producer: Jesse Cook; David Foster; Julian Gallagher; Trevor Horn; James Horner; Simon Rhodes; Grace Row; Keith Thomas

Charlotte Church chronology
Enchantment (2001)	Prelude: The Best of Charlotte Church (2002)	Tissues and Issues (2005)

Professional ratings
Review scores
Source	Rating
Allmusic	3/5 stars

Prelude: the Best of Charlotte Church is a 'best of' collection spanning the four classical music albums of the 16-year-old soprano Charlotte Church, released in 2002, and also available on DVD-Audio.

Prelude commemorates the end of Charlotte Church's classical career; her next album, Tissues and Issues, would be a pop release.

== Track listing ==
1. "Pie Jesu"
2. "My Lagan Love"
3. "In Trutina"
4. "Panis Angelicus"
5. "Amazing Grace"
6. "Just Wave Hello"
7. "La Pastorella"
8. "She Moved Through the Fair"
9. "Ave Maria"
10. "Dream a Dream (Feat. Billy Gilman)"
11. "The Flower Duet"
12. "Habañera"
13. "The Prayer (Feat. Josh Groban)"
14. "All Love Can Be"
15. "It's the Heart That Matters Most"
16. "Tantum Ergo"
17. "Bridge Over Troubled Water"
18. "Sancta Maria"

== Release history ==
Country	Release date	Label
United Kingdom	25 November 2002	
United States	26 November 2002	Columbia Records
