= Crazy Chick =

2005 single by Charlotte Church

Single by Charlotte Church

from the album Tissues and Issues
- B-side: "Easy to Forget"
- Released: 27 June 2005
- Studio: Gula (Malmö, Sweden)
- Genre: Pop
- Length: 3:07
- Label: Sony BMG
- Songwriters: Sarah Buras; Wirlie "Wyl-e" Morris; Fitzgerald Scott
- Producer: Tore Johannson

Charlotte Church singles chronology
"The Opera Song (Brave New World)" (2003)	"Crazy Chick" (2005)	"Call My Name" (2005)

"Crazy Chick" is a song by Welsh recording artist Charlotte Church, released as the lead single from her fifth studio album, Tissues and Issues (2005). It was written by Sarah Buras, Wirlie "Wyl-e" Morris, and Fitzgerald Scott and produced by Tore Johannson. Originally intended for Fame Academy series two alumna Alex Parks, the song was offered to Church when Parks rejected it. Church loathed the song, calling it "throwaway pop", but she succumbed to her record company's demands and recorded it. The lyrics of the song describes a woman who feels that she needs professional help because she is madly in love.

"Crazy Chick" was released in the United Kingdom on 27 June 2005. The song reached number two on the UK Singles Chart in July 2005, becoming Church's second top-three hit on that chart and her first under her real name (she was credited as "CMC" on "The Opera Song (Brave New World)"). The single also reached number 10 in Ireland and the top 40 in Australia and New Zealand. In February 2021, the British Phonographic Industry (BPI) awarded the song a silver sales certification for sales and streams exceeding 200,000.

== Background ==
"Crazy Chick" was written by Sarah Buras, Wirlie "Wyl-e" Morris, and Fitzgerald Scott. They originally offered the song to Alex Parks, a contestant in the second series of British talent competition Fame Academy, but she turned the offer down. Instead, they approached Charlotte Church, who had recently switched from singing classical music to pop music. In 2012, Church revealed that she hated the song, as she saw the lyrics as "stupid", but she was forced to record it. It was then added onto Tissues and Issues because she was unable to write any songs herself. Church explained that this originated from her belief that early songwriting is substandard, so she relented to her record company and allowed them to include more single-worthy tracks on the album. The song's resulting popularity enraged her more, with her explaining, "I hated it because it didn't mean anything – I don't think it helped anyone with their emotional problems – and it was just a bit of throwaway pop, which I wasn't about".

== Critical reception ==
Justin Myers of the Official Charts Company wrote that "Crazy Chick" was a "breath of fresh air [...] reminiscent of a '60s girlgroup" and complimented Church's vocals, noting that they resembled those of Christina Aguilera's at several instances. British columnist James Masterton said that, compared to Church's earlier classical work, "Crazy Chick" was underwhelming, calling her voice "too good" for the track and noting that Joss Stone would have performed the song better.

== Track listings ==
UK CD1 and Irish CD single
No.	Title	Writer(s)	Length
1.	"Crazy Chick"	Sarah Buras; Wirlie "Wyl-e" Morris; Fitzgerald Scott
2.	"Easy to Forget"	Charlotte Church; Rob Davis; Marcella Detroit

UK CD2
No.	Title	Writer(s)	Length
1.	"Crazy Chick"	Buras; Morris; Scott
2.	"Crazy Chick" (acoustic version)	Buras; Morris; Scott
3.	"Crazy Chick" (Kardinal Beats Krazy Klub remix)	Buras; Morris; Scott
4.	"Crazy Chick" (video)

Australian CD single
No.	Title	Writer(s)	Length
1.	"Crazy Chick"	Buras; Morris; Scott
2.	"Crazy Chick" (acoustic version)	Buras; Morris; Scott
3.	"Crazy Chick" (Kardinal Beats Krazy Klub remix)	Buras; Morris; Scott
4.	"Easy to Forget"	Church; Davis; Detroit
5.	"Crazy Chick" (video)

== Credits and personnel ==
Credits are lifted from the UK CD2 liner notes.

Studios

- Recorded at Gula Studio (Malmö, Sweden)
- Mixed at the Pierce Rooms (London, UK)

Personnel

- Fitzgerald Scott – writing
- Sarah Buras – writing
- Wirlie "Wyl-e" Morris – writing
- Charlotte Church – vocals
- Jens Lindgard – guitar, trombone
- Tore Johannson – bass, production
- Rasmus Kihlberg – drums
- Martin Gjerstad – keyboard
- Petter Lindgard – trumpet
- Sven Andersson – saxophone
- David Carlsson – engineering
- Steve Fitzmaurice – mixing
- Mark Reilly – mixing assistant

== Charts ==
=== Weekly charts ===
Chart (2005)	Peak position
Australia (ARIA)	39
Europe (Eurochart Hot 100)	9
Ireland (IRMA)	10
New Zealand (Recorded Music NZ)	33
Scotland Singles (OCC)	2
UK Singles (OCC)	2

=== Year-end charts ===
Chart (2005)	Position
UK Singles (OCC)	34

== Certifications ==
Region	Certification	Certified units/sales
United Kingdom (BPI)	Silver	200,000^{‡}
^{‡} Sales+streaming figures based on certification alone.

== Release history ==
Region	Date	Format(s)	Label(s)	Ref.
United Kingdom	27 June 2005	CD	Sony BMG	
Australia	31 October 2005	CD	Sony BMG	
