= Moodswings (To Come at Me like That) =

2006 single by Charlotte Church

"Moodswings (to Come at Me like That)"

Single by Charlotte Church

from the album Tissues and Issues
- Released: 27 February 2006
- Length: 3:10
- Label: Sony BMG
- Songwriters: Fitzgerald Scott, Gary Smith, Malik Mason Williams, Maureen Collin, Kalenna Harper
- Producer: Tore Johansson

Charlotte Church singles chronology
"Even God Can't Change the Past" (2005)	"Moodswings (to Come at Me like That)" (2006)	"Back to Scratch" (2010)

"Moodswings (To Come at Me like That)" is Welsh singer-songwriter Charlotte Church's fourth and final single from her fifth studio album, Tissues and Issues (2005). "Moodswings" reached number 14 on the UK Singles Chart in March 2006.

== Music video ==
The video was directed by production team Harvey & Carolyn who previously directed the music video for "Biology" by Girls Aloud and the similarities in effects and costumes can clearly be seen. The video features Church in different settings and poses. During the scenes, Church's clothes change on her at regular and close intervals, and sometimes she even seems to change "form" altogether; for example, she at one point changes into a child. When only her face is seen, she is given different make-up and glasses, and also make-up which seems to imply injury. She is seen in one scene to walk from different places into the same room holding a sign above her head, which shows the lyrics.

== Track listings ==
CD single

No.	Title	Writer(s)	Length
1.	"Moodswings (To Come at Me like That)"	Fitzgerald Scott; Gary Smith; Malik Mason Williams; Maureen Colin; Kalenna Harper	3:10
2.	"Calling You"		4:40

UK digital download 1

No.	Title	Writer(s)	Length
1.	"Moodswings (To Come at Me like That)" (live at HMV Cardiff)	Fitzgerald Scott; Gary Smith; Malik Mason Williams; Maureen Colin; Kalenna Harper	3:12

UK digital download 2

No.	Title	Writer(s)	Length
1.	"Moodswings (To Come at Me like That)" (Moodswing Remix)	Fitzgerald Scott; Gary Smith; Malik Mason Williams; Maureen Colin; Kalenna Harper	2:59

== Charts ==
Chart (2006)	Peak position
Ireland (IRMA)	42
Scotland Singles (OCC)	12
UK Singles (OCC)	14
