= Tissues and Issues =

Studio album by Charlotte Church
- Released: 11 July 2005
- Recorded: 2005
- Genre: Dance-pop, pop rock, R&B, soul
- Length: 47:55
- Label: Daylight, Epic, Sony BMG
- Producer: Steve Fitzmaurice, Guy Chambers, Richard Flack, Tore Johansson, Fitzgerald Scott, Graham Stack, Eg White

Charlotte Church chronology
Prelude: The Best of Charlotte Church (2002)	Tissues and Issues (2005)	Back to Scratch (2010)

Singles from Tissues and Issues
- 1. "Crazy Chick" Released: 27 June 2005; 2. "Call My Name" Released: 26 September 2005; 3. "Even God" Released: 12 December 2005; 4. "Moodswings (To Come at Me like That)" Released: 27 February 2006

Professional ratings
Review scores
Source	Rating
AllMusic	3/5 stars
The Guardian	2/5 stars
Stylus Magazine	D+

Tissues and Issues is the fifth studio album by the Welsh singer Charlotte Church released by Sony BMG UK in the United Kingdom on 11 July 2005 and by Daylight Records and Epic Records in the United States on 12 July 2005. The album debuted on the UK Albums Chart at number five and was accredited platinum by BPI for sales over 300,000. The album yielded Church four successful top twenty singles; "Crazy Chick", "Call My Name", "Even God" and "Moodswings (To Come at Me like That)".

The album represents a whole new direction for the singer. Her previous album, Prelude, a 'best of' album, had ended her classical career; Tissues and Issues is her first ever pop album.

The first single to be taken from the album, "Crazy Chick", released shortly before the album itself, reached number two on the UK Singles Chart. "Call My Name", the second single, reached number ten in October 2005. "Even God", the third single, debuted in the Top 20 in early December 2005. The fourth single, "Moodswings (To Come at Me like That)", was released on 27 February 2006, and peaked at number fourteen on the UK charts.

Tissues and Issues is Charlotte Church's second and final album with Sony Music UK.

== Track listing ==
No.	Title	Writer(s)	Length
1.	"Call My Name"	Charlotte Church; Wayne Hector; Eg White	3:00
2.	"Crazy Chick"	Sarah Buras; Wirlie Morris; Fitzgerald Scott	3:08
3.	"Moodswings (To Come at Me like That)"	Maureen Collin; Kalenna Harper; Gary Smith; Malik Mason Williams; Scott	3:11
4.	"Show a Little Faith"	John Beck; Steve Chrisanthou; Charles Hutchinson	4:38
5.	"Finding My Own Way"	Church; Marcella Detroit; Cliff Masters	4:07
6.	"Let's Be Alone"	Guy Chambers; Church	3:47
7.	"Easy to Forget"	Church; Rob Davis; Detroit	4:25
8.	"Fool No More"	Church; Mark Read; Graham Stack	3:52
9.	"Easy Way Out"	Gary Barlow; Church; Eliot Kennedy	4:35
10.	"Casualty of Love"	Chambers; Church	3:55
11.	"Even God"	Rick Nowels; George O'Dowd; John Themis	4:10
12.	"Confessional Song"	Chambers; Church	5:07

Notes

1. When "Even God" was released as a single on 12 December 2005, the name was changed to "Even God Can't Change the Past".

== Charts ==
Chart (2005)	Peak position
Ireland Albums Chart	27
UK Albums Chart	5
Chart (2006)	Peak position
Mexican Albums Chart	69

Provider	Certification
BPI	Platinum
IRMA	Gold

=== Year-end chart ===
Chart (2005)	Position
UK Albums (OCC)	84

== Release history ==
Region	Date	Label	Format	Catalog
United Kingdom	11 July 2005	Sony BMG	CD	5203462
Australia	5 March 2006	Sony BMG	CD	5203462000
United States	12 June 2009	Sony BMG	MP3	B002ATS83K
