= Charlotte Church =

Welsh singer (born 1986)

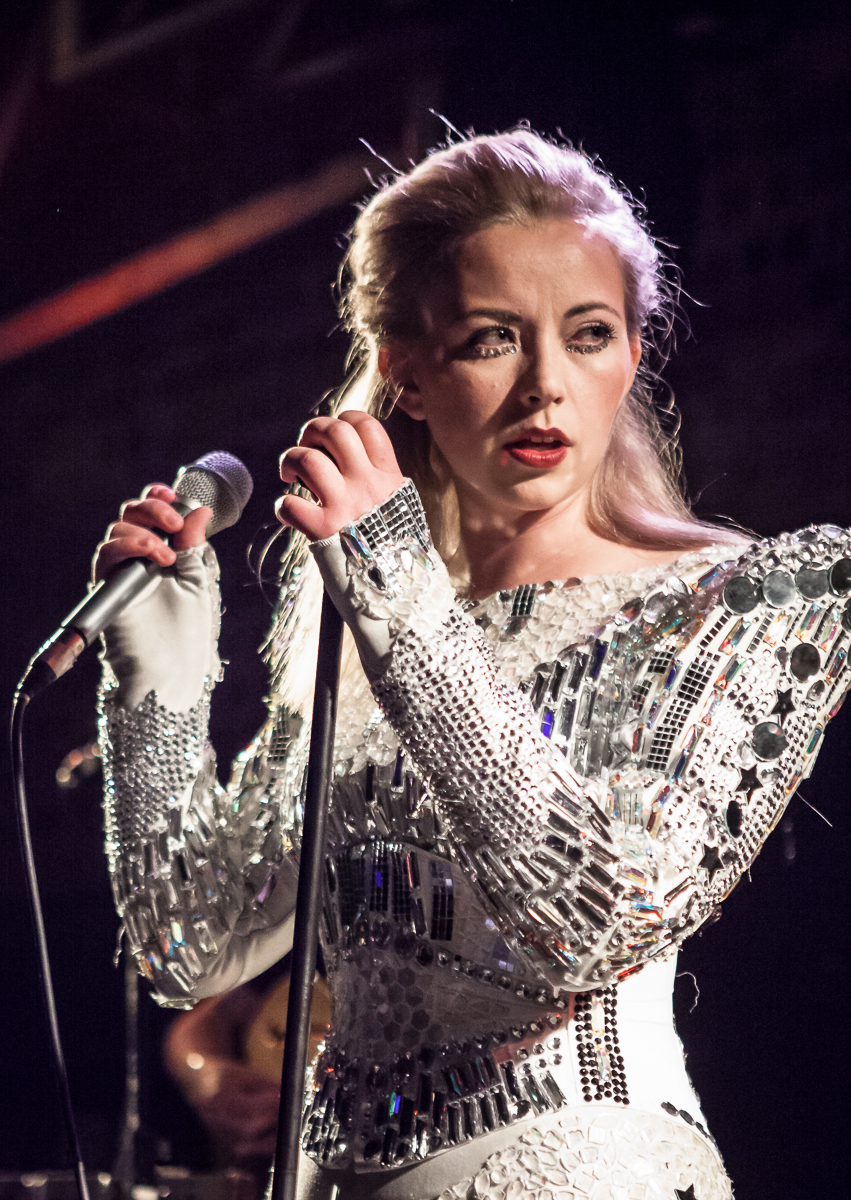
- Church performing at the FOCUS Wales Festival in 2013
- Born: Charlotte Maria Reed; 21 February 1986 (age 40); Cardiff, Wales
- Occupations: Singer; songwriter; actress; presenter
- Years active: 1997–present
- Spouse: Jonathan Powell (m. 2017)
- Partner: Gavin Henson (2005–2010)
- Children: 3
- Musical career
- Genres: Pop; alternative rock; classical crossover; operatic pop; Celtic
- Instrument: Vocals
- Labels: Sony; Power Amp

Charlotte Maria Church (born Charlotte Maria Reed, 21 February 1986) is a Welsh singer, actress, and television presenter.

As a child, Church was a popular classical singer; as a young woman, she made a less successful move into pop music in 2005. By 2007, she had sold more than ten million records worldwide including over five million in the United States. She hosted a Channel 4 comedy chat show, The Charlotte Church Show. Church released her first album in five years, Back to Scratch, on 25 October 2010. Church is a soprano.

Church has embraced political activism, supporting Jeremy Corbyn when he led the Labour Party, Plaid Cymru in the Senedd elections, and the cause of Welsh independence.

== Early life ==
Church was born Charlotte Maria Reed on 21 February 1986 in Llandaff, a district of Cardiff, Wales, to Maria and computer engineer Stephen Reed. Her parents separated when she was two, and she was raised by her mother, who brought her up as a Roman Catholic. In 1992, Maria married her second husband, James Church, who adopted Charlotte in 1999. She has four siblings: two younger half-brothers, through her biological father, and two older step-siblings from her adoptive father's previous marriage.

Charlotte's musical break came at age 11 when she sang Andrew Lloyd Webber's "Pie Jesu" over the telephone on the television show This Morning. This was followed by her performance on ITV's Big, Big Talent Show the same year. Subsequent to a request to sing "Pie Jesu" at Rupert Murdoch's 1999 wedding to Wendy Deng, it was revealed Murdoch and Church's management at the time persuaded Church to waive a £100,000 payment for singing at his wedding in return for "good press". Church also received a vocal scholarship to Howell's School Llandaff in Cardiff, where she started in 1998, after leaving The Cathedral School, Llandaff. With help from tutors, she was able to manage both performing and school work, and said in many interviews she was "just like every other girl her age". She left school in 2002 at the age of 16.

== Music career ==
=== 1998–2002: Classical career ===
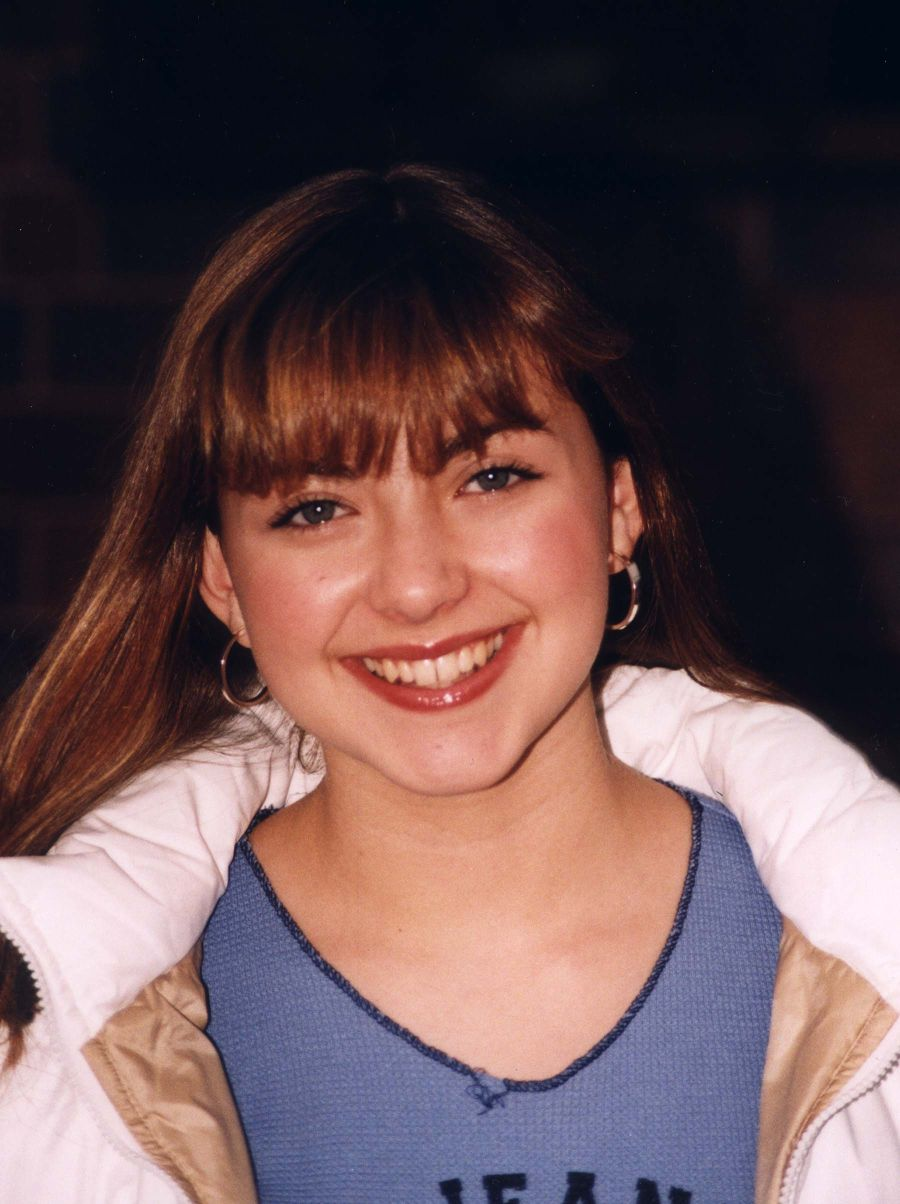
Church in 2000

As a classical music singer, Church sang in English, Welsh, Latin, Italian, and French. She was then introduced to the Cardiff impresario Jonathan Shalit, who became her manager and negotiated a contract with Sony Music. Her first album, Voice of an Angel (1998), was a collection of arias, sacred songs, and traditional pieces that sold millions worldwide and made her the youngest artist with a No. 1 album on the British classical crossover charts.

Church appeared on US Public Broadcasting Service (PBS) specials. Her 1999 eponymous second album also included operatic, religious, and traditional tracks. One, "Just Wave Hello", was the centrepiece of a millennium-themed ad campaign for the Ford Motor Company. The song's full-length video, featuring Church, won acclaim at the Detroit Auto Show and introduced her to new fans. The track reached No. 31 in Britain.

In 2000, she released Dream a Dream, an album of Christmas carols. It included Church's first foray into a more non-classical, pop-influenced style in the title track Dream a Dream, borrowing the melody from Fauré's Pavane and featuring American child country singer Billy Gilman.

In 2001, Church added more pop, swing, and Broadway with her album Enchantment. That year, Church made her first film appearance in the 2001 Ron Howard film A Beautiful Mind. Celine Dion was beginning a concert engagement in Las Vegas and was not available to perform the film's end title song, "All Love Can Be", so composer James Horner enlisted Church and the song was rewritten for her vocal range. Church also handled other vocal passages throughout the score.

In 2002, at 16, she released a "best of" album called Prelude, and took part in the Royal Christmas tour alongside Dame Julie Andrews and Christopher Plummer, marking the end of her classical music career. Her next album, Tissues and Issues, would be a pop release.

=== 2003–2009: Pursuing pop career; Tissues and Issues ===
In 2003 Church teamed up with trance music producer Jurgen Vries to sing vocals on his track "The Opera Song (Brave New World)". She was credited on the records as CMC (her initials) as it was her first foray into pop music. The song reached number three in the UK Singles Chart, Church's second highest-charting single and Vries' highest.

In 2005, Church released her first pop album, Tissues and Issues. Four singles were successful in the UK with "Crazy Chick" reaching number two, "Call My Name" number ten, "Even God Can't Change the Past" number seventeen, and "Moodswings" number fourteen. Although these were released in Australia as well, they failed to reach the same level of success there. Church's pop album was released in the US through Amazon.com MP3 shop, and iTunes in 2009.

In April 2006, Church performed three concerts in Glasgow, London, and Cardiff, in venues holding between 2,000 and 3,000 people; the dates at London and Cardiff were sold out. Supported by Irish band the New Druids, Church performed a mix of tracks from her debut pop album and a number of pop covers including Prince's "Kiss" and Gloria Estefan's "Rhythm is Gonna Get You".

In November 2006, it was announced that she and Sony had parted ways. According to her publicist, this was a mutual decision reached after a series of meetings throughout the year, which were held since her six-album contract had ended. There was speculation that Church had decided to take a break from her singing career to focus on her television show. Others suggested that her pop releases' chart performance contributed to the decision. Yet another factor was her pregnancy with her daughter, Ruby Megan Henson.

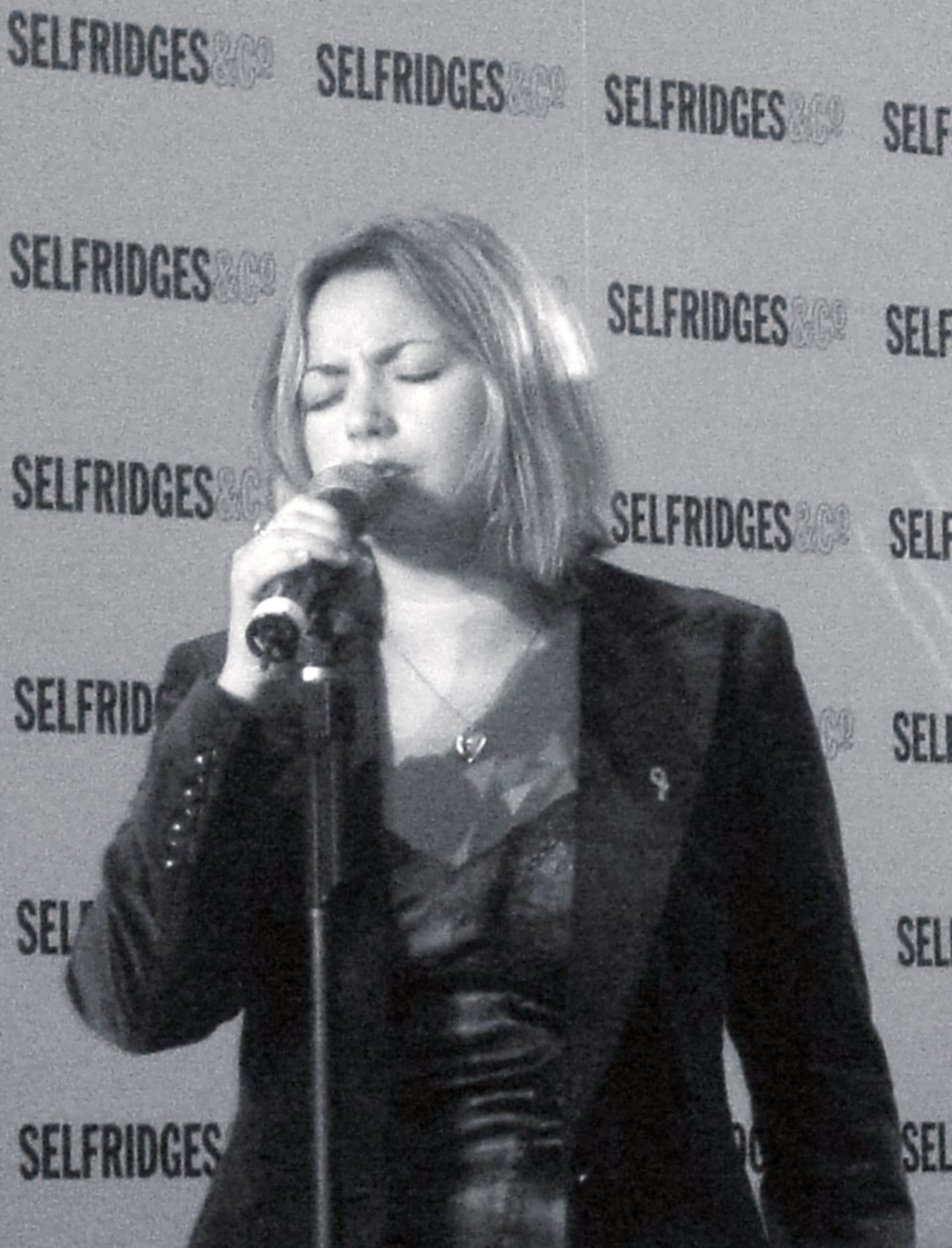
Church performing at Selfridges, 2005

In 2007, Church became Patron of the charity The Topsy Foundation UK, helping to raise awareness and funds for its work to support rural communities in South Africa, empowering people infected with and affected by HIV and AIDS, through medical care, social support and skills development.

Articles emerged in the UK press in March and April 2008 stating that she was still training classically, considering a return to classical crossover. Church has sung in religious services in Taizé. She has also performed before Pope John Paul II, Queen Elizabeth II, King Charles III (at that time the Prince of Wales), and U.S. President Bill Clinton.

In June 2008, she became pregnant with her son, Dexter Lloyd Henson. In an interview, she mentioned she would be ready to work on more music in a few months, although she was not sure whether she would further develop her career in classical, pop, or both, as she loved both genres for different reasons. Church also mentioned that she had been working with a vocal instructor to keep her voice in check.

In June 2009, Church was interviewed for Hello! magazine, discussing her life since having her second child. She said that she was currently in the studio, resuming work on a new album and that her partner, Gavin Henson, had been strongly encouraging her to get back to work pursuing the career that she has greatly missed since settling down.

=== 2010–2011: Return to music and Back to Scratch ===
Church appeared on Friday Night with Jonathan Ross on 13 March 2010, where she confirmed that she had already begun writing and recording her sixth studio album. Church also stated that the album was of a different sound to previous ones, more mature with a "kooky" vibe.

On 4 August 2010, Church made a new track, "Cold California", available to download from her website.

Church's album, Back to Scratch, was released in the UK on 25 October 2010. The 14-track album was produced by Martin Terefe. Back to Scratch was preceded by a single – the LP's title track – on 24 October. "Back to Scratch" was originally inspired "by problems facing a family member", but Church admitted in a press release that the song now has resonance to her own personal life following her split from Gavin Henson. Back to Scratch also featured the song "The Actors", which Church performed on BBC One talent contest Over the Rainbow, and a cover of Joni Mitchell's "River".

It was announced on 13 March 2011 that Church had ended her US$3 million deal with Power Amp Music over promotional disputes. Her spokesperson released the following statement: "All I can really say, because of the confidentiality issues, is that it was in Charlotte's financial interests to do so before the agreement entered the second year of its term. This is typical for these types of deal, which are investment deals rather than record deals. I can also say that the decision to terminate the term early, which suited both parties, was made well before the commercial release of the album." A spokesperson from the record label also released a statement saying "It didn't work out with Charlotte and that's fair enough. There was no falling out. It was a mutual decision. They decided to exit the deal."

The third single to be released from the album, "Snow" was released on 11 April 2011.

=== Since 2012: One, Two, Three, and Four ===
On 26 May 2012, Church premiered three new songs — "The Rise", "How Not to be Surprised When You're a Ghost", and "Say It's True" — on BBC Radio with Bethan Elfyn. Church released her first EP ONE on 4 September 2012.

On 19 December 2012, Church released the lead single from her second EP, "Glitterbombed" on The Line of Best Fit, an online music magazine. Her second EP Two was released on 4 March 2013.

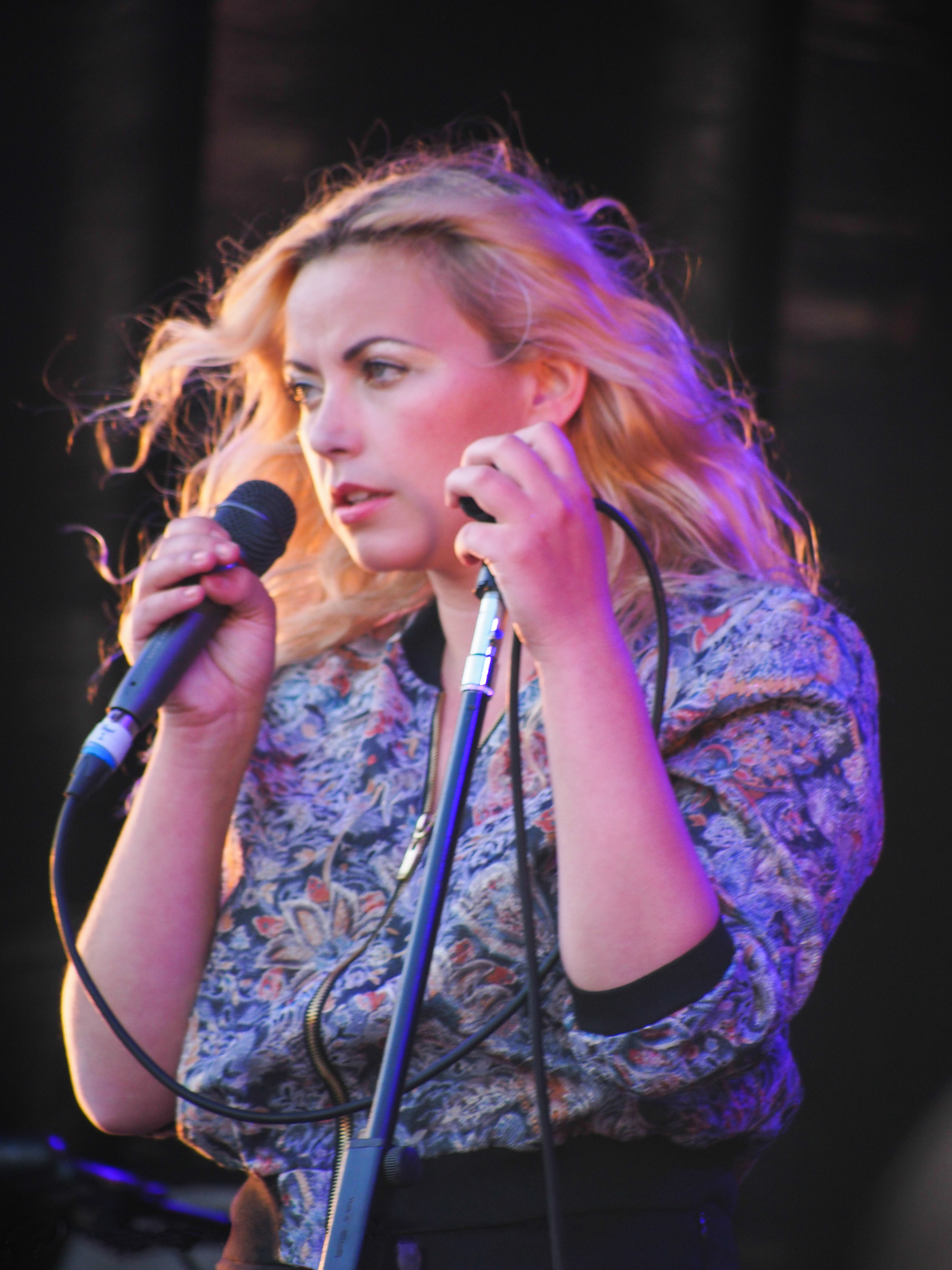
Church performing at the Victorious festival in 2013

One and Two were combined for a US release on 12 March 2013. Church promoted One and Two in the US with her first North American performances in almost a decade. She appeared in New York, Los Angeles and Toronto, and at the South by Southwest Festival. Her costumes for her North American concerts were designed by Zoe Howerska.

Church released the lead single from her third EP, "I Can Dream" via SoundCloud on 15 July 2013. Her third EP THREE was released on 19 August 2013.

Church's fourth EP Four was released on 10 March 2014. She released a music video for the lead single from the EP, "Little Movements" on YouTube on 15 March 2014.

== Acting and television career ==
Church has made a number of cameo appearances on television. She appeared in the CBS series Touched by an Angel, appeared in the 1999 Christmas special of Heartbeat, and in 2002, 2003 and 2012 she appeared on episodes of Have I Got News for You (the first time as the show's youngest-ever panellist; the second time as host). In 2005, she played herself in an episode of The Catherine Tate Show, in a sketch with the fictional character Joanie Taylor ("Nan"). In 2008, Church appeared briefly in a sketch in Katy Brand's Big Ass Show.

In December 2005, for The Paul O'Grady Show Christmas pantomime, The Wizard of Oz, Church played Dorothy Gale.

In the summer of 2006, Church presented an entertainment TV show, The Charlotte Church Show. After a pilot episode, which caused some controversy and was never broadcast, the series began airing on 1 September 2006 on Channel 4. Church won a British Comedy Award for Best Female Comedy Newcomer in 2006, and the Funniest TV Personality award at the 2006 Loaded Magazine's LAFTA awards. In 2008, she was nominated for the Rose d'Or Special Award for Best Entertainer.

In January 2010, for Hospital 24/7, Church made an appearance on the programme finale, in which she visited the Children's Hospital for Wales to launch the Noah's Ark Appeals campaign. This was intended to fund the equipment in the new Critical Care Unit, which would help children needing high dependency, or critical and intensive care.

In 2014 Church performed as Mrs Ogmore Pritchard in a BBC adaptation of Under Milk Wood by Dylan Thomas.

In 2018, Church appeared in the BBC One documentary Charlotte Church: Inside My Brain, in which she explores the subject of mental health and the various kinds of research being done in the field.

In 2022, Church appeared as "Mushroom" on the third series of The Masked Singer and finished in second place.

The same year, Church had a brief cameo in the seventh episode of the TV series Welcome to Wrexham, in which she was interviewed by Wrexham A.F.C. co-owners Ryan Reynolds and Rob McElhenney before singing Wrexham's team anthem and the Welsh National Anthem.

In February 2024, Church appeared as a contestant on Wheel of Fortune winning £4,100 for her own charity The Awen Project.

In May 2025, Church was announced as a contestant on the first series of The Celebrity Traitors. Church was selected as a Faithful but was the fourth contestant to be "murdered" by Traitors Alan Carr, Jonathan Ross and Cat Burns in the fifth episode.

In September 2025, Church was announced to appear in the seventh series of RuPaul's Drag Race UK as a special celebrity guest during a makeover challenge (episode "The Hun Makeover").

== Writing ==
Church released an autobiography titled Voice of an Angel (My Life So Far) in October 2000, aged 14. She released a second autobiography titled Keep Smiling in late 2007.

In 2015, and again in 2019, Church wrote several opinion pieces for The Guardian.

== Political activities ==
Church gave BBC 6 Music's John Peel Lecture at The Lowry in Salford in 2013, in which she criticised the music industry for what she described as a culture of sexism that pressures female artists to project a sexualised image of themselves.

Following Church's appearance at the Leveson Inquiry, she became increasingly outspoken on a number of political issues, which she has explained as growing out of her experience of Leveson, as well as the Conservative victory in the 2015 general election. She is a member of the media campaigning group Hacked Off.

In May 2015, she joined a demonstration organised by the People's Assembly Against Austerity in Cardiff, subsequently addressing a crowd of 250,000 at a People's Assembly march in London the following month. At the 2015 Glastonbury Festival, she chaired a conversation with two members of Russian feminist punk band Pussy Riot. In August 2015, she performed the song "This Bitter Earth" outside the Shell Centre in London as part of a month-long protest organised by Greenpeace against Shell's pursuit of petroleum exploration in the Arctic. The following month, she endorsed Jeremy Corbyn's campaign in the Labour Party leadership election, In 2016, Church, along with other celebrities, toured the UK to support Corbyn's bid to become Prime Minister, and in March 2016, performed at a socialist fundraising event in Edinburgh for Corbyn.

In May 2016, she declared her support for the Welsh nationalist party, Plaid Cymru, in the National Assembly for Wales election. Church is a supporter of Welsh independence, performing at a pro-independence concert in 2019.

In January 2017, she took part in a protest in Cardiff about Donald Trump's inauguration as US president.

In February 2024, she was recorded singing in support of Palestine, in the period following the Israeli invasion of the Gaza Strip after the 7 October attacks by Hamas on Israel. She led a choir of about 100 people in a rendition of "From the river to the sea", a phrase commonly heard at pro-Palestinian marches, which led to accusations of antisemitism.

== Personal life ==
Church's personal life and relationships were reported on by UK tabloid newspapers, inspiring the song "Let's Be Alone" on her album Tissues and Issues (2005).

After the September 11 attacks in 2001, when she was 15, Church was criticised for the remarks attributed to her by the New York Post in which she allegedly criticised "the hero status afforded to New York firefighters" in their aftermath. She apologised for the remarks a month later, as well as at the Leveson Inquiry in 2011, stating that her comments were taken out of context. In a 2006 interview with Davina McCall, Church agreed that being diplomatic was "not in her nature".

The press devoted much attention to Church's relationship with her first boyfriend in 2002, model and musician Steve Johnson, and her second boyfriend, Kyle Johnson (no relation).

In 2007, Church made an appearance on a British young people's rich list with her then-boyfriend, Welsh rugby player Gavin Henson. They were ranked 49th-richest young people in Britain with an estimated joint wealth of £12 million.

In November 2011, Church testified before the Leveson Inquiry about the media intrusion into her personal life, stating "I've been made a caricature for so long, and this person portrayed in the tabloids really isn't me. It's not the person I am, and it's had a massive impact on my career. As an artist, I find it hard to be taken seriously because my credibility has been blown to bits."

On 27 February 2012, Church accepted £600,000 in damages and costs in settlement of a lawsuit arising out of the News International phone hacking scandal. In 1999 News International's owner, Rupert Murdoch, had persuaded Church to waive a performance fee in return for "good press". She had claimed that 33 stories about her that appeared in the News of the World were the product of illegal hacking into her family's voicemail. After the settlement was announced in open court, she made a lengthy statement in which she said, "I have also discovered that despite the apology which the newspaper has just given in court, these people were prepared to go to any lengths to prevent me exposing their behaviour [...]. In my opinion, they are not truly sorry, only sorry they got caught."

Church and Gavin Henson had mentioned wanting to marry numerous times on talk shows and in the press; they became engaged in February 2010. Henson proposed to Church with a two-carat heart-shaped diamond ring in Cornwall. The couple announced their engagement six weeks later, in April 2010. Church and Henson have two children. She gave birth to their daughter Ruby in September 2007, and to their son Dexter in January 2009.

Church met musician, Back to Scratch collaborator, and former employee of James and Maria Church, Jonathan Powell, at The Robin Hood pub in Canton, Cardiff. They began dating in late 2010. In June 2017, she suffered a miscarriage. On 4 October that year, Church and Powell secretly married at a register office in Cardiff, before blessing their marriage with an intimate ceremony in front of family and friends under a tree at their home in Twyncyn, Dinas Powys.

In 2019, Church founded The Awen Project, a life learning and educational charity with access to nature in a secluded environment, starting with an initial pupil roll ambition of up to 20 children. Its aim is to set up free-to-attend, democratic learning communities in natural settings, providing a more nature-based alternative education relevant to their interests.

Church and Powell had a daughter in August 2020. Church had originally planned to give birth under a tree in their garden, but as the weather changed they moved indoors. Church explained, "I laboured under there overnight, which was beautiful, but then I had her screaming on the bathroom floor. Mother Nature came and went, 'Sit down, silly lady.'...I live next to a golf course, and I could really hear the golfers. As my noise started to up, I thought, 'This is not going to work.'"

In 2021, Church bought Rhydoldog House, a mansion in the Elan Valley, near Rhaeadr, Powys, Wales, a former home of Laura Ashley, as seen on the HGTV and Discovery+ programme Charlotte Church's Dream Build, to run as a retreat or "wellness centre".

In February 2022, Church was the subject of Kate Garraway's Life Stories, revealing that she had made a decision to quit music in 2002. Church explained that her mother caught her smoking at home at the age of 16, whereupon Church moved out, "cut the ties", and set up home independently, rebelling against the "facade of the celebrity culture", as she wanted to experience normal teenage life. By 19, Church had resumed her career.

== Discography ==
Studio albums

- Voice of an Angel (1998)
- Charlotte Church (1999)
- Dream a Dream (2000)
- Enchantment (2001)
- Tissues and Issues (2005)
- Back to Scratch (2010)

== Television and film ==
Television
Year	Title	Role	Notes
1999	Touched by an Angel	Alice, an orphan	Guest role
1999	Heartbeat	Katie Kendall	Guest role
2002; 2003; 2012; 2026	Have I Got News For You	Herself	Panellist (2002 & 2026); Presenter (2003 & 2012)
2003	I'll Be There	Olivia Edmonds	Lead role
2005	Charlotte Church: Confessions of a Teen Angel	Herself	Documentary
2005	The Catherine Tate Show	Herself	Guest role
2006–2008	The Charlotte Church Show	Herself	Presenter
2008	Katy Brand's Big Ass Show	Various	Guest role
2010	Over the Rainbow	Herself	Judge
2010	Hospital 24/7	Herself	Guest role
2015	Under Milk Wood	Polly Garter	
2018	Charlotte Church: Inside My Brain	Herself	Presenter
2020	Who Wants to Be a Millionaire?	Celebrity contestant	
2021	Catchphrase	Celebrity contestant	
2022	The Masked Singer	Mushroom	Runner up
2022	Charlotte Church's Dream Build	Herself	Presenter
2022	Kate Garraway's Life Stories	Herself	Series 21
2022	Welcome to Wrexham	Herself	Cameo
2025	The Celebrity Traitors	Herself	Contestant; series 1
2025	RuPaul's Drag Race UK	Special guest	Series 7

== Awards and nominations ==
Year	Award	Category	Result
2000	Classical BRIT Awards	Best Female Artist	Nominated
2000	Classical BRIT Awards	British Artist of the Year	Won
2000	Hollywood Reporters Young Star Awards	Best Young Recording Artist Or Musical Group	Won
2000	Institute of Public Relations in Wales	Millennium Communicator of the Year	Won
2002	Rear of the Year	N/A	Won
2005	GQ Awards	Woman of the Year	Won
2006	Brit Awards	Best British Female	Nominated
2006	Loaded Lafta Awards	Funniest T.V. Personality	Won
2006	Glamour Awards	Editors Choice Award	Won
2006	Glamour Awards	Solo Artist of the Year	Won
2006	British Comedy Awards	Best Female Newcomer	Won
2007	Glamour Awards	Readers Favourite TV Personality	Won
2008	Rose d'Or Awards	Best Entertainer	Nominated

== See also ==
- List of Welsh musicians
