= Eternal discography =

- Studio albums: 4
- Compilation albums: 5
- Singles: 22
- Video albums: 2

The discography of Eternal, a British female R&B and pop group, consists of four studio albums, five compilation albums, one remix album, two video albums and twenty-two singles on EMI Records. Eternal has sold over 10 million albums, with Always & Forever (15), Power of a Woman (25) and Before the Rain (35) ranked in the UK Official Charts Company's Top 40 biggest girl band studio albums of the last 25 years.

In 1993 they released their debut single "Stay", which reached the top 5 in the United Kingdom and Australia (where it was certified Gold); it also reached the top 20 in Ireland, New Zealand and the US. In the US, "Stay", sold 220,000 copies as of December 1994. The group's debut album Always & Forever produced six top 20 singles in the UK, including "So Good" which was a number one hit in Ireland. Released in November 1993, Always & Forever peaked at number 2, and made Eternal the first all-female group to sell over a million copies of an album in the UK, being certified 4× Platinum by March 1995. As of 1997, the album has sold 4 million copies worldwide.

Eternal's second album Power of a Woman was released in October 1995 and certified 2× Platinum in March 1996. Peaking at number 6 in the UK, the album produced four top 10 singles; including the top 5 hit, "Power of a Woman", which was Gold-certified in Australia; plus "I Am Blessed" which peaked at number 7 in the UK. As of February 1997, Power of a Woman has sold 2 million copies worldwide.

Before the Rain, their third album, was released in March 1997, with first week sales exceeding 100,000 copies in the UK alone. It contained the group's highest-charting singles in the UK; "Don't You Love Me" and the number-one hit "I Wanna Be the Only One" (featuring BeBe Winans), which was a top 10 hit in twelve territories. Before the Rain was certified Platinum in the UK, whilst "I Wanna Be the Only One" received Platinum certifications from the British Phonographic Industry and Norwegian branch of the International Federation of the Phonographic Industry. As of June 2019, "I Wanna Be the Only One" is ranked number 28 on the UK Official Charts Company's Top 100 girl band singles of the last 25 years.

In October 1997, the group released Greatest Hits, which peaked at number 2 and was certified 3× Platinum in the UK. The compilation also received Platinum certifications in New Zealand and Norway. "Angel of Mine", released as the sole single from the compilation, was a top 5 hit in the UK and Norway (where it was certified Gold); whilst the 1999 cover by American recording artist Monica peaked at number 1 in the US. Eternal released their self-titled fourth album in November 1999, peaking at number 87. "What'cha Gonna Do", the album's sole single, peaked at number 16 in the UK and appeared on the German, Swedish and Dutch singles charts.

== Albums ==
=== Studio albums ===
List of albums, with selected chart positions and certifications
Title	Album details	Peak chart positions										Sales	Certifications
Title	Album details	UK	AUS	BEL (FL)	GER	JPN	NLD	NZ	NOR	SWI	US	Sales	Certifications
Always & Forever	Released: 29 November 1993; Label: EMI; Formats: CD, cassette, vinyl	2	48	35	43	25	12	46	—	—	152	World: 4,000,000; UK: 1,400,000; AUS: 35,000; GER: 35,000; JPN: 100,000; US: 81,000	BPI: 4× Platinum; ARIA: Gold; IRMA: Gold; NVPI: Gold; RIAJ: Gold
Power of a Woman	Released: 30 October 1995; Label: EMI; Formats: CD, cassette	6	14	—	—	35	44	—	—	—	—	World: 2,000,000	BPI: 2× Platinum
Before the Rain	Released: 17 March 1997; Label: EMI; Formats: CD, cassette	3	36	16	50	18	1	42	20	21	—		BPI: Platinum; NVPI: Gold; RIAJ: Gold
Eternal	Released: 8 November 1999; Label: EMI; Formats: CD, cassette, vinyl	87	—	—	—	43	—	—	—	—	—		
"—" denotes album that did not chart or was not released

=== Compilation albums ===
List of compilation albums, with selected chart positions and certifications
Title	Album details	Peak chart positions										Certifications
Title	Album details	UK	UK R&B	BEL (FL)	GER	JPN	NLD	NZ	NOR	SWE	SWI	Certifications
A Platinum Celebration	Released: 1995; Label: EMI; Formats: CD, cassette	—	—	—	43	—	—	—	—	—	—	
Greatest Hits	Released: 24 October 1997; Label: EMI; Formats: CD, cassette	2	1	16	47	35	9	4	4	20	12	BPI: 3× Platinum; NVPI: Gold; IFPI-NOR: Platinum; RIAJ: Gold; RMNZ: Platinum
Stay – The Essential Eternal Collection	Released: 2001; Label: EMI; Formats: CD	—	—	—	—	—	—	—	—	—	—	
Now & Forever	Released: 18 November 2002; Label: Disky; Formats: CD	—	—	—	—	—	—	—	—	—	—	
Essential Eternal	Released: 23 December 2002; Label: EMI Gold; Formats: CD	—	—	—	—	—	—	—	—	—	—	
"—" denotes album that did not chart or was not released

=== Remix albums ===
Title	Album details
The Remixes	Released: 23 March 2007; Label: Parlophone; Formats: Digital download

=== Video albums ===
Title	Album details	Peak chart positions	Certifications
Title	Album details	UK Music Videos	Certifications
Always & Forever	Released: 28 November 1994; Label: EMI; Formats: VHS, DVD	5	BPI: Gold
The Greatest Clips	Released: 1997; Label: EMI; Formats: VHS, DVD	18	

== Singles ==
List of singles as lead artist, with selected chart positions and certifications, showing year released and album name
Title	Year	Peak chart positions										Sales	Certifications	Album
Title	Year	UK	AUS	BEL (FL)	FRA	GER	IRE	ISL	NLD	NZ	US	Sales	Certifications	Album
"Stay"	1993	4	3	—	17	79	19	—	30	11	19	US: 220,000	ARIA: Gold	Always & Forever
"Save Our Love"	1994	8	70	—	—	86	20	23	—	34	—		RMNZ: Gold	Always & Forever
"Just a Step from Heaven"	1994	8	62	—	—	—	26	—	—	29	— (Note: "Just a Step from Heaven" did not enter the Billboard Hot 100, but peaked at number 15 the Bubbling Under R&B/Hip-Hop chart.)			Always & Forever
"So Good"	1994	13	—	—	—	—	1	—	—	49	—			Always & Forever
"Oh Baby I..."	1994	4	102	31	—	—	11	39	9	11	—		BPI: Silver	Always & Forever
"Crazy"	1994	15	—	—	—	—	23	—	—	25	—			Always & Forever
"Power of a Woman"	1995	5	8	—	—	—	19	33	37	33	—		ARIA: Gold	Power of a Woman
"I Am Blessed"	1995	7	14	—	—	—	7	40	26	31	—		BPI: Silver	Power of a Woman
"Good Thing"	1996	8	82	—	—	—	23	—	—	—	—			Power of a Woman
"Who Are You?"	1996	—	—	—	—	—	—	—	—	—	—			Power of a Woman
"Someday"	1996	4	27	—	—	92	18	—	—	—	—	UK: 130,000		The Hunchback of Notre Dame OST and Before the Rain
"Secrets"	1996	9	—	—	—	—	—	—	—	—	—			Power of a Woman
"Don't You Love Me"	1997	3	25	44	—	—	23	17	19	31	—			Before the Rain
"I Wanna Be the Only One" (featuring BeBe Winans)	1997	1	10	7	6	14	3	27	4	4	—	UK: 728,000	BPI: Platinum; ARIA: Gold; BEA: Gold; IFPI NOR: Platinum; IFPI SWI: Gold; NVPI: Platinum; RMNZ: Platinum; SNEP: Gold	Before the Rain
"The Megamix"	1997	—	—	—	—	—	—	—	— (Note: "The Megamix" did not enter the Dutch Single Top 100, but peaked at number 20 on the Tipparade chart, which acts as an extension to the Dutch Top 40.)	—	—			—N/a
"Angel of Mine"	1997	4	—	27	41	85	12	—	17	17	—		BPI: Silver; IFPI NOR: Gold	Greatest Hits
"What'cha Gonna Do"	1999	16	—	— (Note: "What'cha Gonna Do" did not enter the Ultratop 50 Flanders, but peaked at number 10 on the Ultratip Flanders chart, which acts as an extension to the Ultratop 50.)	—	84	—	—	50	—	—			Eternal
"—" denotes album that did not chart or was not released

== Promotional singles ==
List of promotional singles, with selected chart positions, showing year released and album name
Title	Year	Chart positions				Album
Title	Year	UK Airpl. 100	UK Club	US R&B /HH	US Adult R&B	Album
"Sweet Funky Thing"	1994	—	1	54	40	Always & Forever
"Dreams"	1997	—	—	—	—	Before the Rain
"Might as Well Be Me"	1997	86	—	—	—	Greatest Hits
"Libre Para Vivir"	1999	—	—	—	—	Eternal
"I Cry Real Tears"	2000	—	—	—	—	Eternal
"—" denotes album that did not chart or was not released
