= Greatest Hits (Eternal album) =

Greatest hits album by Eternal
- Released: 20 October 1997
- Recorded: 1992–1997
- Label: EMI; 1st Avenue
- Producer: Dennis Charles; Ronnie Wilson; Nigel Lowis; Simon Climie; Rhett Lawrence; BeBe Winans; Debra Killings; Arnold Hennings; Dallas Austin; Harvey Mason

Eternal chronology
| Before the Rain (1997) | Greatest Hits (1997) | Eternal (1999) |

Singles from Greatest Hits
- 1. "Angel of Mine" Released: 29 September 1997

Professional ratings
Review scores
| Source | Rating |
|---|---|
| AllMusic | 4.5/5 stars |
| Music Week | 5/5 stars |

Greatest Hits (released internationally as The Best) is the first compilation album by the British girl group Eternal, released in October 1997. The album contains their fourteen consecutive Top 15 hit singles, which at the time was an unprecedented record for a British girl group. The album peaked at number 2 on the UK Albums Chart and was certified 3× Platinum by the BPI for sales of over 900,000 copies.

In January 2014, following the announcement of the group's reformation for the second series of ITV reality show The Big Reunion, the album entered at number 1 on the iTunes Hip-Hop chart.

== Track listing ==
| No. | Title | Writer(s) | Origin | Length |
|---|---|---|---|---|
| 1. | "Angel of Mine" | Rhett Lawrence; Travon Potts | Previously unreleased, 1997 | 4:21 |
| 2. | "Stay" | Bob Khozouri; Mark Stevens | Always & Forever, 1993 | 4:01 |
| 3. | "Save Our Love" | Eddie Chacon; Scott Cutler; Anne Preven | Always & Forever | 3:46 |
| 4. | "Just a Step from Heaven" | Wayne Cohen; Sheppard Solomon | Always & Forever | 3:57 |
| 5. | "So Good" | Easther Bennett; Vernie Bennett; Kéllé Bryan; Louise Nurding | Always & Forever | 3:49 |
| 6. | "Oh Baby I..." | Tommy Faragher; Lotti Golden | Always & Forever | 4:33 |
| 7. | "Crazy" | BeBe Winans | Always & Forever | 3:57 |
| 8. | "Power of a Woman" (radio edit) | Evan Rogers; Carl Sturken | Power of a Woman, 1995 | 3:57 |
| 9. | "I Am Blessed" | Marsha Malamet; Mark Mueller | Power of a Woman | 4:22 |
| 10. | "Good Thing" (radio mix) | David Frank; Jeff Pescetto | Power of a Woman | 3:51 |
| 11. | "Someday" (Eric Clapton version) | Alan Menken; Stephen Schwartz | Before the Rain | 4:21 |
| 12. | "Secrets" (remix) | Debra Killings | Power of a Woman | 3:06 |
| 13. | "Don't You Love Me" (radio mix) | Cynthia Biggs; Terence Dudley; Christopher Kellum; Carolyn Mitchell | Before the Rain, 1997 | 3:49 |
| 14. | "I Wanna Be the Only One" (featuring Bebe Winans) (radio edit) | Lawrence; Winans | Before the Rain | 3:38 |
| 15. | "Who Are You?" | Ronnie Wilson | Power of a Woman | 3:16 |
| 16. | "Finally" | E. Bennett; V. Bennett; Dennis Charles | Before the Rain Japanese edition | 3:20 |
| 17. | "Might as Well Be Me" | E. Bennett; Derek Bennett | Previously unreleased, 1997 | 4:02 |

Japanese edition
| No. | Title | Writer(s) | Origin | Length |
|---|---|---|---|---|
| 18. | "Think About Me" | Michelle Lewis | Before the Rain | 4:39 |
| 19. | "Talk About It" | Emosia; Cathy Liggett; Mike Lorello | "Angel of Mine" B-side, 1997 | 4:49 |

== Charts ==
=== Weekly charts ===
| Chart (1997–98) | Peak position |
|---|---|
| Belgian Albums (Ultratop Flanders) | 31 |
| Belgian Albums (Ultratop Wallonia) | 50 |
| Danish Albums (Hitlisten) | 8 |
| Dutch Albums (Album Top 100) | 9 |
| European Albums (Top 100) | 14 |
| Finnish Albums (Suomen virallinen lista) | 31 |
| French Albums (SNEP) | 6 |
| German Albums (Offizielle Top 100) | 47 |
| Irish Albums (IRMA) | 5 |
| Japanese Albums (Oricon) | 35 |
| New Zealand Albums (RMNZ) | 4 |
| Norwegian Albums (VG-lista) | 4 |
| Scottish Albums (OCC) | 6 |
| Spanish Albums (Promusicae) | 4 |
| Swedish Albums (Sverigetopplistan) | 20 |
| Swiss Albums (Schweizer Hitparade) | 21 |
| UK Albums (OCC) | 2 |
| UK R&B Albums (OCC) | 1 |

| Chart (2014) | Peak position |
|---|---|
| UK Album Downloads (OCC) | 93 |
| UK R&B Albums (OCC) | 16 |

| Chart (2022) | Peak position |
|---|---|
| UK R&B Albums (OCC) | 34 |

=== Year-end charts ===
| Chart (1997) | Position |
|---|---|
| Dutch Albums (Album Top 100) | 51 |
| UK Albums (OCC) | 9 |
| Chart (1998) | Position |
| Dutch Albums (Album Top 100) | 67 |
| UK Albums (OCC) | 92 |

== Certifications ==
| Region | Certification | Certified units/sales |
|---|---|---|
| France (SNEP) | Gold | 100,000^{*} |
| Japan (RIAJ) | Gold | 100,000^{^} |
| Netherlands (NVPI) | Gold | 50,000^{^} |
| New Zealand (RMNZ) | Platinum | 15,000^{^} |
| Norway (IFPI Norway) | Platinum | 50,000^{*} |
| United Kingdom (BPI) | 3× Platinum | 900,000^{^} |
Summaries
| Europe (IFPI) | Platinum | 1,000,000^{*} |
^{*} Sales figures based on certification alone.^{^} Shipments figures based on certification alone.
