= Kéllé Bryan =

English singer presenter and actress (born 1975)

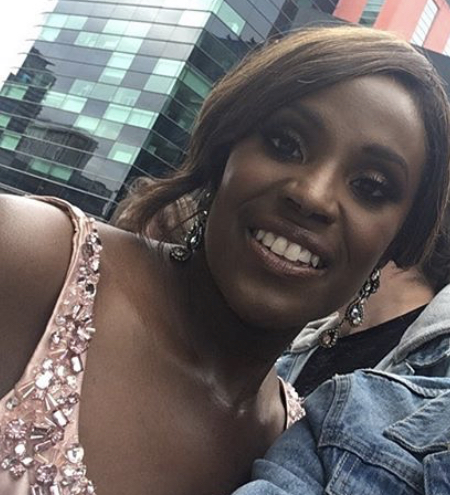
- Bryan in 2019
- Born: 12 March 1975 (age 51); Plaistow, London, England
- Education: Italia Conti Academy of Theatre Arts
- Occupations: Singer; actress
- Years active: 1991–present
- Spouses: Jay Gudgeon (m. 2010)
- Children: 2
- Musical career
- Genres: R&B; gospel; soul
- Instruments: Vocals
- Labels: EMI; Mercury
- Formerly of: Eternal
- Website: www.kellebryan.co.uk

Kéllé Bryan (born 12 March 1975) is an English singer and actress, known as one of the founding members of girl group Eternal. The group sold more than 10 million records and achieved the UK number-one single "I Wanna Be the Only One" alongside BeBe Winans.

When Bryan was 11, she joined the Italia Conti Academy school where she trained in the performing arts for eight years, and later qualified as a dance teacher. She met friend and future bandmate Louise Redknapp (née Nurding) during her studies. The two later formed Eternal with Vernie Bennett and Bennett's younger sister, Easther. During her time in the group, they recorded three UK top-ten albums.

Bryan played Martine Deveraux in the Channel 4 soap opera Hollyoaks from 2018 until 2022. In 2019, she became part of the Loose Women panel. In October 2020, Bryan, Charlene White, Brenda Edwards and Judi Love became the first all-Black panel in the show's history.

== Life and career ==
=== 1975–1992: Early life and career beginnings ===
Bryan was born on 12 March 1975 in Plaistow, Greater London, to a British Caribbean family. Aged 11, Bryan joined the Italia Conti Academy stage school, where she completed eight years of performing arts training, and qualified as a dance teacher.

While at the school, she met Louise Nurding. The pair met executive record producer Oliver Smallman, who was forming a girl group. According to Nurding, Eternal was initially planned as a trio consisting of Nurding and the Bennett sisters. Nurding then suggested adding Bryan to form a quartet.

On 31 March 1992 Bryan appeared as Debbie, a college friend of Lloyd Tavernier (Garey Bridges) in the BBC soap opera, EastEnders.

=== 1993–1998: Success in Eternal ===
In 1993, Bryan and Nurding, together with sisters Easther and Vernie Bennett formed the British R&B girl group Eternal. The group went on to sell 10 million records. They released their debut album, Always & Forever in November 1993. The album included the hit singles "Stay" and "Just a Step from Heaven", and reached number two in the UK Albums Chart. The album sold over one million copies in the United Kingdom, and was awarded four times platinum, making it one of 1994's biggest selling albums. After the debut album, Nurding left the group.

Two years later, the group, now a trio, released their second album, Power of a Woman. The album, including the hit title track, would reach 4× platinum and a song from the album, "I Am Blessed" was performed for Pope John Paul II. Their third album, Before the Rain, included their only number-one hit, "I Wanna Be the Only One" featuring BeBe Winans.

=== 1999–2000: Short-lived solo career and hiatus ===
After their "rush-released" compilation, Greatest Hits, which included the single "Angel of Mine" that was later recorded by American singer Monica, Bryan was controversially fired from Eternal by their solicitor via fax.

Following her departure from Eternal, Bryan signed a record deal with Mercury Records and began work on her debut solo album, titled Breakfast in Bed, scheduled for release in November 1999. The album was never released. Her debut single, "Higher than Heaven", was released in the UK on 20 September 1999. It debuted at number 14 on the chart and remains Bryan's only solo hit to date. The song was marked as a "next week hit" in the magazine Hit Music.

The second single, "I Wanna Know", was released to Lithuanian radio on 5 August 2000. The single was released to radio in the United Kingdom, and was scheduled to be fully released on 4 September. However, the single release was subsequently shelved after Bryan was diagnosed with lupus. The single was digitally reissued by Universal Music on 23 August 2019. The song was also included on the Universal Music TV compilation Hot Pop!

=== 2006–2018: TV career ===
In 2006, Bryan was a contestant on Love Island 2, finishing as the female runner-up. Bryan said that being on the show has given her "the confidence to know that [she] did have a life outside of Eternal". Six years later, Bryan also had a starring role in a film called The Naked Poet, playing the part of Michelle. In 2012, she played the part of Fran in the BBC comedy Me and Mrs Jones.

Bryan joined the cast of the Channel 4 soap opera Hollyoaks in September 2018, portraying the role of Martine Deveraux.

After four years of appearing on Hollyoaks, Bryan announced her exit from the show on 3 June 2022 with her final scenes airing that same day.

=== 2019–present: Loose Women and short-lived Eternal comeback ===
From May 2019, she has been appearing regularly on ITV's show Loose Women. On 1 June 2023, Bryan made a surprise appearance on stage at friend and former bandmate Louise's Shepherd's Bush Empire concert where they performed 1994 Eternal single "Crazy".

In September 2023, Bryan pulled out of a planned Eternal reunion tour as a show of support of the LGBT community. Redknapp and Bryan reported that Easther and Vernie Bennett had refused to perform at a number of proposed LGBT pride events over objections that the trans community had "hijacked" pride. Bennett's manager Denis Ingoldsby commented that the sisters supported the LGBT community and played at many events, but that Vernie has raised concerns about "the trans lobby". Bryan went on to post a statement on her Twitter stating she is "an advocate for inclusion and equality for all".

== Personal life and health issues ==
Bryan was diagnosed with lupus in 1998. In 2014, Bryan began to develop serious symptoms of her lupus. She lost a lot of hair and her sight, hearing, and movement deteriorated, and she was unable to speak. She then had a seizure, and the doctors confirmed that her lupus was affecting her brain. After the seizure, Bryan had to relearn how to read and write, and continues to struggle with short-term memory loss. She is a patron of St Thomas' Lupus Trust.

In 2010, she married Jay Gudgeon. The pair have two children together.

In 2024, Bryan was hospitalised due to a kidney stone. She said on Loose Women that the pain was so intense that she asked her 12-year-old son to help take her to the hospital.

== Discography ==
=== Eternal discography ===
- Always & Forever (1993)
- Power of a Woman (1995)
- Before the Rain (1997)

=== Solo discography ===
Title	Year	Peak chart positions	Album
Title	Year	UK	Album
"Higher than Heaven"	1999	14	Non-album singles
"I Wanna Know"	2000	—	Non-album singles
"—" denotes a recording that did not chart in that territory.

== Filmography ==
Year	Title	Role	Notes	Ref.
1992	EastEnders	Debbie	Episode: 31 March 1992	
2004	The Weakest Link	Herself - Contestant	Episode: "Pop Special"	
2006	Celebrity Love Island	Herself - Contestant	Runner-up	
2006	The All Star Talent Show	Herself - Contestant	1 episode, 3rd place	
2007	The Virus	Nurse	Short film	
2009	The Brothers	Jen	Main role, 3 episodes	
2012	Me and Mrs Jones	Fran	Main role, 6 episodes	
2012	Rocket's Island	Wendy Sparks	3 episodes	
2014	Celebrity Chase	Herself - Contestant	1 episode	
2014	Celebrity Juice	Herself - Panellist	3 episodes	
2015	Flockstars	Herself - Contestant	2 episodes	
2016	The Naked Poet	Michelle	Film	
2018–2022	Hollyoaks	Martine Deveraux	Series regular, 244 episodes	
2019–present	Loose Women	Herself - Panelist	213 episodes	
2022	The Weakest Link	Herself - Contestant	1 episode	
2023	Significant Other	Shelley	Main role, 5 episodes	
2024	Celebrity Catchphrase	Herself - Contestant	1 episode	
2024	Richard Osman's House of Games	Herself - Contestant	Series 8; 5 episodes	
2025	Crongton	Mum (Liccle Bit's)	8 episodes	
2025	The Hit List	Herself - Contestant	Episode: "Celebrity Special"	
2025	Pointless Celebrities	Herself - Contestant	1 episode	

== Stage ==
Year	Title	Role	Venue	Ref.
2005–2006	Jack and the Beanstalk	Jill	Buxton Opera House	
2006–2007	Cinderella	Cinderella	Catford Theatre	
2007–2008	Cinderella	Cinderella	Oakengates Theatre	
2008–2009	Aladdin	Princess Jasmine	Rickmansworth Watersmeet Theatre	
2009–2010	Cinderella	Cinderella	Derby Assembly Rooms	
2010–2011	Cinderella	Cinderella	The Playhouse, Weston Super Mare	
2023-2024	Snow White	Good Fairy Elementa	Grand Theatre, Wolverhampton	

== Awards and nominations ==
Year	Award	Category	Result	Ref.
2020	TV Choice Awards	Best Soap Actress	Nominated	
2020	Inside Soap Awards	Best Actress	Nominated	
2020	I Talk Telly Awards	Best Soap Performance	Nominated	
2021	26th National Television Awards	Serial Drama Performance	Nominated	
2021	Inside Soap Awards	Best Actress	Nominated	
2021	Inside Soap Awards	Best Partnership (shared with Richard Blackwood)	Nominated	
2021	I Talk Telly Awards	Best Soap Performance	Nominated	
2022	The British Soap Awards	Best Leading Performer	Nominated	
