= Mark Mueller =

American songwriter

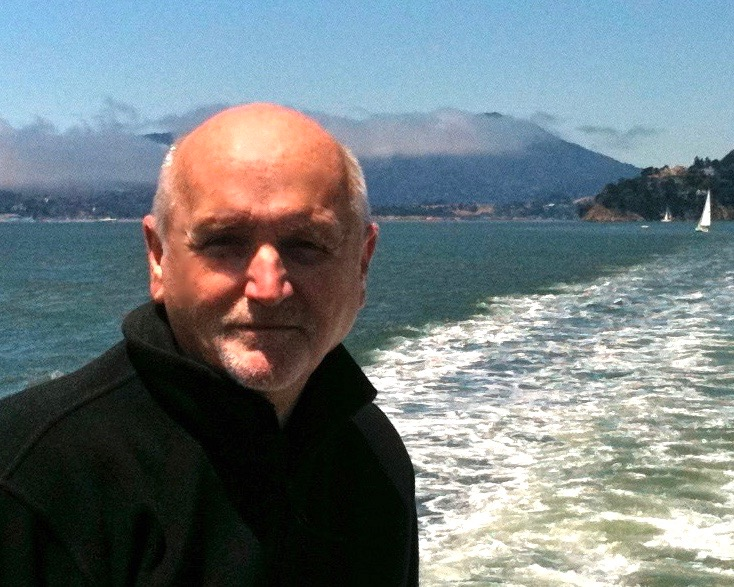
- Mueller in 2010

Background information
- Born: July 11, 1957 (age 69)
- Origin: California, U.S.
- Genres: Pop, rock, R&B/soul, Musical theater
- Occupations: Songwriter, Composer

Mark Mueller (born July 11, 1957) is an American songwriter and singer. A two-time winner of the ASCAP Pop Award for writing one of the Most Performed Songs of the year, he has had three Billboard Hot 100 Top Ten singles and one #1 Adult Contemporary hit. He co-wrote the hits "Crush" by Jennifer Paige and "That's What Love Is For" by Amy Grant and wrote both words and music for the Top 10 hit "Nothin' At All" by Heart. Songs he has written have been featured on RIAA-certified gold and platinum records in four consecutive decades: the 1980s, 1990s, 2000s and 2010s; and on the Billboard Top 10 charts for 30 years.

For his work in television, Mueller has been the recipient of two Emmy nominations, both in the category of Outstanding Achievement in Music and Lyrics. Mueller wrote the words and music for the theme songs of both the original Disney's DuckTales and Chip 'n Dale Rescue Rangers animated TV series as well as the 2017 DuckTales reboot. In 2022, Mueller's Chip 'n Dale: Rescue Rangers theme song was performed by rapper and singer Post Malone for the Disney+ movie version of Chip 'n Dale: Rescue Rangers and also appears on the soundtrack.

A Vanity Fair magazine article about Mueller and his DuckTales theme song covered his pop music career and his experience writing the song. In 2023, two of his themes were included in Billboard magazine's list of the 100 "Best Disney Songs of All Time" (film, television and theme park music) marking the studio's first 100 years, with DuckTales ranked at #19 and Chip 'n Dale: Rescue Rangers at #63. Mueller was born in the Bay Area and graduated from University of California, Berkeley; he lives and works in Los Angeles.

== Chart History ==
"Crush", recorded by Jennifer Paige, was #3 on the Billboard Hot 100 Chart for 4 weeks. It spent 17 weeks in the Top 10 and 25 weeks overall on the chart. "Crush" also peaked at #2 on the R&R CHR/Pop airplay chart. "Crush" was also the 10th most played pop song of the year on the R&R CHR/Pop Year-End Chart.

"Crush" was a #1 single in Canada, Spain, New Zealand and Australia. In the UK, "Crush" reached #1 on the airplay chart and #4 on the UK Singles Chart, where it spent three weeks in the Top 10.

In 2016, "Crush" returned to the Billboard Top 10 when it peaked at #5 on the magazine's Smooth Jazz Airplay chart in a cover by jazz keyboardist John Novello. His version features R&B saxophone artist Gerald Albright on the chorus. It spent a total of 19 weeks in the Top 30.

"That's What Love Is For" by Amy Grant was #1 on the Billboard Adult Contemporary chart for 3 weeks (13 weeks in the Top 10 and 32 weeks on the chart overall), reached #7 on the Billboard Hot 100 chart (4 weeks in the Top 10) and peaked at #4 on the R&R CHR chart.

"Nothin' at All" by Heart reached #10 on the Billboard Hot 100 and spent 16 weeks on the chart overall. The song peaked at #8 for two weeks on the R&R CHR pop airplay chart and was #6 on the Billboard Mainstream Rock Songs for two weeks as well, staying in the Top 10 for four weeks. Mueller wrote both words and music for the Pop/Rock song.

Mueller's Eternal single "I Am Blessed" peaked at #7 on the UK BPI singles chart, spending three weeks in the Top 10.

"Someone", performed by El DeBarge made the Top 20 Billboard Adult Contemporary chart and peaked at #20, where it spent two weeks. Overall it stayed on the magazine's Adult Contemporary Chart for 13 weeks as well as 9 weeks on the Billboard Hot 100. It was co-written with twice Grammy Award-winner Jay Graydon and singer Robbie Nevil.

Earth, Wind & Fire recorded "You & I", a single Mueller co-wrote with singer Robbie Nevil that was a Billboard R&B Chart Top 30 hit in 1987, reaching #29.

ABBA's Agnetha Faltskog recorded Mueller's "I Wasn't the One (Who Said Goodbye)", which was a Top 20 hit in 1988, reaching #19 on the Billboard Adult Contemporary Chart. It was a duet with Peter Cetera, former lead singer of the band Chicago. Co-written with Aaron Zigman, the song also spent time in the Billboard Hot 100, peaking at #93.

George Benson's "No One Emotion", which Mueller co-wrote with Clif Magness, was released as a single in the UK in 1985 where it reached #76 on the Official British Pop Chart.

"Just Because I Love You" by Lina Santiago reached #27 on the Billboard Rhythmic Top 40 Chart hit in 1996. It spent eight weeks in the Billboard Hot 100, peaking at #78.

Mueller's first Billboard chart hit was "I Don't Want To Be Lonely", performed by Dana Valery. It reached #23 on the Billboard Adult Contemporary chart and spent 13 weeks on that chart and five weeks on the magazine's Hot 100.

== Gold and Platinum Records ==
Mueller's work in the U.S. has been featured on RIAA-certified platinum and gold records including: Heart's Heart (Heart album), which went 5x platinum, Amy Grant's Heart in Motion, which went 5x platinum, 'N Sync featuring Justin Timberlake on Pokémon: The First Movie (soundtrack), which went 2x platinum, Lea Michele (on the Glee: The Music, Volume 2 Soundtrack), Jennifer Paige, Earth, Wind & Fire, SWV, Al Jarreau, George Benson, Aaron Carter, El DeBarge, Agnetha Fältskog of ABBA, Peter Cetera, and The Pointer Sisters (on the Billboard #1 We Are The World album). His theme song for DuckTales is featured on the platinum-selling record The Music of Disney: A Legacy in Song.

Internationally, Mueller's songs have been on the UK's BPI (British Phonographic Industry)-certified platinum and gold records by artists including Girls Aloud featuring Cheryl, Eternal and their Greatest Hits (Eternal album), which went 3x platinum and Power of a Woman, which went 2x platinum, Japanese pop/rock star Mari Hamada's Return to Myself album, which went platinum, Steps's Buzz (Steps album), which went 2x platinum, as well as 12 hit compilation albums, with Jennifer Paige on "Now That's What I Call Music! 41" reaching 5x platinum status.Agnetha Fältskog's album went 7x platinum in Sweden.

In Canada, his songs appear on Music Canada-certified gold and platinum records by artists Amy Grant, Heart, *NSYNC on Pokémon: The First Movie (soundtrack), Lea Michele on Glee: The Music, Volume 2 and Robbie Nevil, as well as The Music of Disney: A Legacy in Song.

His songs in Australia have been featured on ARIA-certified gold and platinum records including Jennifer Paige, Lea Michele (Glee: The Music, Volume 2) and lead singer of Little River Band John Farnham's solo album Age of Reason, which reached 11x platinum status, as well as 2 compilation albums.

His songs certified gold in France by SNEP include the hit single Crush (Jennifer Paige song), "Just A Little Closer" by The Pointer Sisters on We Are the World (album) and *NSYNC on the Pokemon: The First Movie (soundtrack).

His songs have been certified gold and platinum in more than 16 countries worldwide, including the US, the UK, France, Germany, Japan, Brazil, Australia, Canada, Taiwan, Sweden, Norway, the Netherlands, Denmark, Ireland and Chile.

== Television and Film ==
Mueller received his two Emmy Award nominations for his work as a lyricist on the ABC-TV series Life Goes On and the NBC-TV series Quincy, M.E.. He wrote both words and music for the title song of Disney's animated series DuckTales (performed by Jeff Pescetto) and Chip 'n Dale Rescue Rangers (performed by Pescetto on the series and The Jets on the Disney Afternoon album). He also wrote the theme song for 1991 film The Little Engine That Could.

Mueller co-wrote the title song, the lyrics and the script for an all-sung CBS-TV musical pilot he executive produced titled Shangri-La Plaza. The show starred Terrence Mann, Chris Sarandon, Melora Hardin and Savion Glover.

The DuckTales theme was performed live twice on the Tonight Show Starring Jimmy Fallon in 2018. In March 2018, it was sung by Brendon Urie of Panic! at the Disco after being selected from the "Audience Suggestion Box." In September 2018 Carrie Underwood sang a brief, spontaneous duet of the DuckTales theme with Jimmy Fallon after telling him it was one of her young son's favorite songs.

The DuckTales theme was played live on ABC-TV's Dancing with the Stars in September 2016 on the second episode of the show's 23rd season, with a performance by the show's Season 20 champion Val Chmerkovskiy and Olympic Gold Medalist Laurie Hernandez.

"Crush" was featured on the "Ballad" episode of Glee in 2009, when it was covered by Lea Michele. Her version of the song is also featured on the soundtrack album Glee: The Music, Volume 2, which peaked at #1 on the Billboard Soundtrack Chart, #3 on the Billboard Hot 200 Album Chart in December 2009 and was certified as a gold record by the RIAA in January 2010. "Crush" was also prominently used in a special TV-movie-length episode of ABC-TV's Sabrina, the Teenage Witch set in Rome, as well as the first episode of Season 9 of Fox TV's Beverly Hills, 90210.

Mueller wrote the song "Babysitting Blues", performed by actress Elisabeth Shue, Blues legend Albert Collins and the cast of Adventures in Babysitting in Chicago-area nightclub Fitzgerald's. The scene was shot over the course of three days and takes place during a pivotal chase sequence.

For the NBC-TV musical comedy series Rags to Riches, Mueller wrote new comedic lyrics for existing hit songs from the '50s and '60s that were featured in most episodes of both seasons of the show. He also wrote the lyrics to the show's theme song.

With Lalo Schifrin, Mueller co-wrote all songs featured in the original film musical Berlin Blues, starring Julia Migenes.

Mueller's songs have been featured in films including: One Hour Photo, Pokémon: The First Movie, Money Talks, B*A*P*S, National Lampoon's Vegas Vacation, The Last Starfighter, Adventures in Babysitting, Simply Irresistible, The Legend of Billie Jean and Honey, I Blew Up The Kid.

== Stage ==
Mueller wrote the lyrics and co-wrote the book of an original musical titled Butterfly, which was directed by Jack Hofsiss and performed at the Goodspeed Opera House. Bernadette Peters performed the song "The Next Dream" from the musical on the Carol Burnett TV variety show Carol & Company.

Mueller also created an original musical, How The Hell Did I Get Here?, with Downton Abbey star and SAG Award-winning actress Lesley Nicol. Mueller, who accompanies Nicol on piano onstage, first performed the show in 2017 at Nicol's alma mater, London's Guildhall School of Music and Drama and in Hong Kong at the historic Fringe Club.

How The Hell Did I Get Here? opened in Chicago in March 2022 and made its New York City Off-Broadway debut in April 2022. The show received an Off Broadway Alliance Award nomination in the category of best Solo Performance in May. The show was scheduled to be a part of the Pittsburgh Public Theater 2022 season at the O'Reilly Theater but was initially postponed due to Covid and later to a death in Nicol's family.

== Awards ==
=== Primetime Emmy Awards ===
Year	Category	Show	Song	Result
1983	Primetime Emmy Award for Outstanding Original Music and Lyrics	Quincy, M.E.	"Quincy's Wedding Song"	Nominated
1991	Primetime Emmy Award for Outstanding Original Music and Lyrics	Life Goes On	"Bittersweet Waltz"	Nominated

=== ASCAP Pop Awards ===
Year	Nominee / work	Award	Result	Ref.
1991	"That's What Love Is For" by Amy Grant	Most Performed Songs	Won	
1998	"Crush" by Jennifer Paige	Most Performed Songs	Won	

=== BMI Pop Awards ===
Year	Nominee / work	Award	Result	Ref.
1986	"Nothin' at All" by Heart	Most Performed Songs	Won	
