= Angel of Mine =

1997 single by Eternal

Single by Eternal

from the album Greatest Hits
- B-side: "Twelve Months"; "Talk About It"; "Dreams" (remix)
- Released: 29 September 1997
- Studio: Sound Gallery (Los Angeles); H-2-O Enterprises (London, England)
- Genre: R&B
- Length: 4:21 (album version); 3:35 (single version)
- Label: EMI; 1st Avenue
- Songwriters: Rhett Lawrence; Travon Potts
- Producer: Rhett Lawrence

Eternal singles chronology
"I Wanna Be the Only One" (1997)	"Angel of Mine" (1997)	"What'cha Gonna Do" (1999)

"Angel of Mine" is a song by British R&B girl group Eternal from their first compilation album, Greatest Hits (1997). It was written by Rhett Lawrence and Travon Potts, produced by Lawrence, and released on 29 September 1997. The song became Eternal's 12th and final top-10 hit on the UK Singles Chart, peaking at number four. "Angel of Mine" was the ensemble's final single as a three-piece, as after its release, Kéllé Bryan left the group. In June 2019, "Angel of Mine" was ranked at number 91 on the Official Charts Company's "Top 100 Girl Band Singles of the Last 25 Years".

In 1998, American singer Monica released a cover version that topped the US Billboard Hot 100 chart for four weeks and peaked at number two on the US Billboard Hot R&B Singles & Tracks chart. It was certified platinum by the Recording Industry Association of America (RIAA) in 1999.

== Critical reception ==
Pan-European magazine Music & Media wrote, "With this lush number, Eternal confirm their status as the U.K.'s queens of the R&B ballad, at the same time offering a preview of their imminent Greatest Hits album, which is due for release on October 20." British magazine Music Week rated "Angel of Mine" five out of five, picking it as Single of the Week. It was described as a "lush, touching ballad, highlighting their vocal prowess", and, "It cannot fail." The magazine's Alan Jones declared it as "particularly uplifting and enjoyable."

== Track listings ==
UK CD1
No.	Title	Length
1.	"Angel of Mine" (original mix)
2.	"Twelve Months"
3.	"Talk About It"
4.	"Dreams" (Mike Dean remix featuring Grand Puba and Sadat X)

UK CD2 and Japanese CD single
No.	Title	Length
1.	"Angel of Mine" (original mix)
2.	"Angel of Mine" (Ignorants club mix)
3.	"Angel of Mine" (Blacksmith "Eternal Meets D&D" mix)
4.	"Dreams" (Frankie Cutlass remix featuring Grand Puba and Sadat X)

UK cassette single
No.	Title	Length
1.	"Angel of Mine" (original mix)
2.	"Twelve Months"
3.	"Angel of Mine" (Blacksmith R&B Rub)
4.	"Angel of Mine" (Ignorants radio mix)

European CD single
No.	Title	Length
1.	"Angel of Mine" (radio edit)
2.	"Power of a Woman" (radio edit)

== Credits and personnel ==
Credits are adapted from the liner notes of Greatest Hits.

Studios

- Recorded at Sound Gallery Studios (Los Angeles) and H-2-O Enterprises (London, England)
- Mixed at Sound Gallery Studios (Los Angeles)

Personnel

- Rhett Lawrence – writing, all instruments, production, programming, arrangement, mixing
- Travon Potts – writing, all instruments, programming, arrangement
- Easther Bennett – lead vocals, background vocals
- Vernie Bennett – background vocals
- Kéllé Bryan – background vocals
- Maxx – mixing
- Dave Pensado – mixing
- Eric White – engineering
- Bryan Golder – engineering
- Simon Bohannon – engineering
- William Catterson – assistant engineering

== Charts ==
=== Weekly charts ===
Weekly chart performance for "Angel of Mine"
Chart (1997)	Peak position
Belgium (Ultratop 50 Flanders)	27
Europe (Eurochart Hot 100)	16
France (SNEP)	41
Germany (GfK)	85
Ireland (IRMA)	12
Netherlands (Dutch Top 40)	14
Netherlands (Single Top 100)	17
New Zealand (Recorded Music NZ)	17
Norway (VG-lista)	3
Scottish Singles Sales (Official Charts)	8
Sweden (Sverigetopplistan)	10
Switzerland (Schweizer Hitparade)	44
UK Singles (Official Charts)	4
UK Airplay (Music Week)	2
UK Hip Hop/R&B (Official Charts)	1

==== Year-end charts ====
Year-end chart performance for "Angel of Mine"
Chart (1997)	Position
Netherlands (Dutch Top 40)	85
Netherlands (Single Top 100)	96
Romania (Romanian Top 100)	46
UK Singles (OCC)	51
UK Airplay (Music Week)	43

== Certifications ==
Certifications for "Angel of Mine"
Region	Certification	Certified units/sales
Norway (IFPI Norway)	Gold	
United Kingdom (BPI)	Silver	200,000^{^}
^{^} Shipments figures based on certification alone.

== Release history ==
Release dates and formats for "Angel of Mine"
Region	Date	Format(s)	Label(s)	Ref.
United Kingdom	29 September 1997	CD; cassette	EMI; 1st Avenue	
Japan	29 October 1997	CD	EMI	

== Monica version ==
"Angel of Mine"

Single by Monica

from the album The Boy Is Mine
- B-side: "The First Night" (remix)
- Released: 9 November 1998
- Genre: Pop; R&B
- Length: 4:10
- Label: Arista
- Songwriters: Rhett Lawrence; Travon Potts
- Producer: Rodney "Darkchild" Jerkins

Monica singles chronology
"The First Night" (1998)	"Angel of Mine" (1998)	"Street Symphony" (1999)

Music video
- "Angel of Mine" by Monica on YouTube

American R&B singer Monica recorded "Angel of Mine" for her second studio album, The Boy Is Mine (1998). On her version, Rodney "Darkchild" Jerkins replaced Lawrence as the song's producer. Jerkins also oversaw mixing along with Dexter Simmons, while recording was handled by Rico Lumpkins. Still credited as a songwriter, Lawrence slightly altered the lyrics for Monica at the behest of Arista Records head Clive Davis. Co-writer Potts commented on Monica's rendition: "Rodney [Jerkins] did an incredible job on the production, and then Monica's interpretation, vocally, was incredible as well. She has such a big voice for someone so young." Monica herself, who was unaware of Eternal's original of "Angel of Mine" until she had recorded her own version the song, described the song about "having a friend that she falls in with, which being human is very easy to do." Sheet music for the song "Angel of Mine" is in the key of D♭ Major in common time with a slow tempo of 96 beats per minute.

=== Critical reception ===
"Angel of Mine" was positively received by Chuck Taylor of Billboard, who called the song "unbelievable" and "absolutely stunning." He also noted its commercial potential, claiming "this song has #1 stamped across its heart." In a retrospective review of the song, Tom Breihan from Stereogum called the song "one more sappy ballad from a time that had no shortage of sappy ballads. But the song has stuck in my head a little more than a lot of the other sappy ballads from that time; the chorus melody is strong enough to pop up in my head whenever I see the song’s title." He further added: "Jerkins kept the sleek acoustic-guitar line from Eternal’s version of the song — a sound so clean that it feels almost unreal. [He] also switched the tempo up a bit and added some subtle synth accents and some itchy drum-machine programming. Those touches aren’t enough to keep "Angel of Mine" from sounding sleepy, but they were enough to set it apart from some of the other pop balladry that was on the charts at the time."

=== Commercial performance ===
"Angel of Mine" was released on 9 November 1998 as the third single from The Boy Is Mine after Lawrence and Clive Davis had worked out a deal which would see Eternal release the song in Europe, while Monica would get to release the song's Jerkins-produced version in North America and Oceania. Following the success of her previous singles, "The Boy Is Mine" and "The First Night", "Angel of Mine" became the album's third consecutive release to reach the top of the US Billboard Hot 100 within nine months. It also reached number two on Billboard's Hot R&B Singles & Tracks chart, becoming the seventh domestic top-10 hit of Monica's career. "Angel of Mine" was ranked third on Billboard's Hot 100 year-end chart for 1999 and placed 62nd on the 1990s decade-end chart.

Elsewhere, "Angel of Mine" became a top-10 hit in Canada, where it peaked at number five on RPM's 100 Hit Tracks chart and reached number eight on both the Adult Contemporary Tracks and Dance charts. It also peaked at number 12 on the Australian Singles Chart and reached number 36 in New Zealand. In the United Kingdom, despite the success of Eternal's 1997 version, "Angel of Mine" spent two weeks on the UK Singles Chart, reaching number 55. It also reached the top 10 of the UK Hip Hop/R&B chart, peaking at number ten.

=== Music video ===
The accompanying music video for "Angel of Mine" was directed by Diane Martel and features Tyrese Gibson as Monica's love interest.

=== Track listings ===
US CD and cassette single
No.	Title	Writer(s)	Producer(s)	Length
1.	"Angel of Mine"	Rhett Lawrence; Travon Potts	Rodney "Darkchild" Jerkins	4:10
2.	"The First Night" (So So Def remix featuring JD and R.O.C.)	Jermaine Dupri; Tamara Savage; Marilyn McLeod; Pam Sawyer	Dupri^{[a]}; Carl-So-Lowe^{[a]}	4:09

UK CD single
No.	Title	Writer(s)	Producer(s)	Length
1.	"Angel of Mine"	Rhett Lawrence; Travon Potts	Rodney "Darkchild" Jerkins	4:10
2.	"Inside" (Masters at Work remix—TNT radio edit)	Diane Warren	David Foster; "Little" Louie Vega^{[a]}; Kenny "Dope" Gonzalez^{[a]}	3:53
3.	"Inside" (Masters at Work remix)	Warren	Foster; Vega^{[a]}; Gonzalez^{[a]}	8:17

Australian CD single
No.	Title	Writer(s)	Producer(s)	Length
1.	"Angel of Mine"	Lawrence; Potts	Jerkins	4:13
2.	"The First Night" (Razor-N-Guido club mix radio edit)	Dupri; Savage; McLeod; Sawyer	Dupri; Peter "Razor" Osback^{[a]}; Guido Osorio^{[a]}	4:37
3.	"Don't Take It Personal (Just One of Dem Days)"	Dallas Austin; Derrick Simmons; Recall Management	Austin	3:50

Notes

- ^{^a} denotes additional producer(s)

=== Credits and personnel ===
Credits are adapted from the liner notes of The Boy Is Mine.

- Monica Arnold – vocals
- Rodney Jerkins – mixing, production
- Rhett Lawrence – writer
- Rico Lumpkins – recording
- Tomi Martin – guitar
- Travon Potts – writer
- Dexter Simmons – mixing

=== Charts ===
==== Weekly charts ====
Weekly chart performance for "Angel of Mine"
Chart (1999)	Peak position
Australia (ARIA)	12
Canada (Nielsen SoundScan)	10
Canada Top Singles (RPM)	5
Canada Adult Contemporary (RPM)	8
Canada Dance/Urban (RPM)	8
New Zealand (Recorded Music NZ)	36
Scottish Singles Sales (Official Charts)	81
UK Singles (Official Charts)	55
UK Hip Hop/R&B (Official Charts)	10
US Billboard Hot 100	1
US Adult Contemporary (Billboard)	6
US Hot R&B/Hip-Hop Songs (Billboard)	2
US Pop Airplay (Billboard)	5
US Rhythmic Airplay (Billboard)	1

==== Year-end charts ====
Year-end chart performance for "Angel of Mine"
Chart (1999)	Position
Australia (ARIA)	57
Canada Top Singles (RPM)	46
US Billboard Hot 100	3
US Adult Contemporary (Billboard)	17
US Hot R&B/Hip-Hop Singles & Tracks (Billboard)	16
US Mainstream Top 40 (Billboard)	32
US Rhythmic Top 40 (Billboard)	6

==== Decade-end charts ====
Decade-end chart performance for "Angel of Mine"
Chart (1990–1999)	Position
US Billboard Hot 100	62

=== Certifications ===
Certifications for "Angel of Mine"
Region	Certification	Certified units/sales
Australia (ARIA)	Gold	35,000^{^}
New Zealand (RMNZ)	Gold	15,000^{‡}
United States (RIAA)	Platinum	1,100,000
^{^} Shipments figures based on certification alone.^{‡} Sales+streaming figures based on certification alone.
