= Eternal (Eternal album) =

Studio album by Eternal
- Released: 8 November 1999
- Labels: EMI; 1st Avenue
- Producers: The Characters; Lawrence Dermer; Emilio Estefan; J-Dub; Eddie Martin; Andy Marvel; Stevie J; Mike Mason; Tim & Bob

Eternal chronology
Greatest Hits (1997)	Eternal (1999)

Singles from Eternal
- 1. "What'cha Gonna Do" Released: 18 October 1999

Eternal is the fourth and final studio album by the British R&B group Eternal, released in November 1999. It was the first album they recorded without former member Kéllé Bryan, who was withdrawn from the group in 1998, and it is their only album as a duo. The album had very little promotion, only peaking at No. 87 on the UK Albums Chart; however, it did peak at No. 15 on the UK R&B Albums Chart and was praised for its more modern R&B sound.

"What'cha Gonna Do" was the only single to be released from the album, and it gave Eternal their last Top 20 hit. "I Cry Real Tears" was due to be the second single from the album; however, its release was cancelled as they parted ways with EMI in early 2000. Eternal also recorded a Spanish version of "Free to Live", called "Libre para vivir", which was released as a promotional single in Spain, where the group’s eponymous and final studio album was eventually certified Gold.

== Critical reception ==
Professional ratings
Review scores
Source	Rating
MTV Asia	5/10

Lennat Mak from MTV Asia noted that while Easther's powerful vocals remain strong and Vernie contributes on some tracks, Mak felt the album lacked the distinctive "Eternal magic" of earlier releases. She noted that the new lineup's songs leaned toward slower R&B, with occasional upbeat tracks like "What'cha Gonna Do," but overall the album did not match the appeal of the group's previous hits.

== Track listing ==
No.	Title	Writer(s)	Producer(s)	Length
1.	"What'cha Gonna Do"	Easther Bennett; Vernie Bennett; Troy Taylor; Charles Farrar	The Characters; The Beatmasters^{[a]}	4:03
2.	"Treat Me Like a Lady"	E. Bennett; V. Bennett; David Anthony	The Characters	3:22
3.	"Sunday Morning"	E. Bennett; V. Bennett; Steven Jordan; Anthony Lowe; Kenny Greene; Tamara Powell; Trina Powell	Stevie J; Lowe^{[b]}; Mike Mason^{[b]}	4:34
4.	"I Cry Real Tears"	Linda Thompson; Reed Vertelney	Stevie J; Mason	4:25
5.	"Pillow Talk"	Tim Kelley; Bob Robinson	Tim & Bob	4:14
6.	"Missing You"	E. Bennett; V. Bennett; Jeffery Walker	J Dub	4:18
7.	"Sensual Man"	Jeff Preschetto; Pam Sheyne; Tracey Ackerman	Stevie J; Mason	4:37
8.	"Free to Live"	E. Bennett; V. Bennett; Hawk Wolinsky; John O'Kane	Emilio Estefan; Lawrence Dermer	4:06
9.	"Your Love Makes Me Week"	E. Bennett; V. Bennett; Andy Marvel	Marvel	3:59
10.	"If She Breaks You Heart"	Eddie Martin	Martin	4:16
11.	"Absent From You"	E. Bennett; V. Bennett	The Characters	4:07
12.	"A Melody"	E. Bennett; V. Bennett; Gordon Chambers	Tim & Bob	4:01
13.	"He Is"	E. Bennett	The Characters	4:31
14.	"Keeping Me Down" (Hidden track)			4:45

Japan bonus track
No.	Title	Length
15.	"Don't Let Go"	3:20

Notes

- ^{^a} denotes additional producer
- ^{^b} denotes co-producer

== Personnel ==
- Keith Andes – vocal & backing vocal production
- Alison Bailey – strings
- Zuille Bailey – strings
- The Beatmasters – remix, additional production
- Vernie Bennett – producer, vocal production
- Kevin "KD" Davis – mixing
- Lawrence P. Dermer – mixing
- Emilio Estefan Jr. – Producer
- Charles Farrar – producer
- Ben Garrison – mix engineer
- J-Dub – producer
- Tim Kelley – producer
- Steven "Stevie J" Jordan – producer
- Anthony Lowe – co-producer
- Andrew Lyn – assistant engineer
- Andy Marvel – producer
- Mike Mason – producer, co-producer
- Elizabeth Nielsen – strings
- Bob Robinson – producer
- Dexter Simmons – mixing
- Brian Smith – engineer
- Barry Stern – strings
- T-Money – scratches
- Chris Theis – engineer
- Troy Taylor – producer

== Charts ==
Chart (1999)	Peak position
Japanese Albums (Oricon)	43
Spanish Albums (Promusicae)	33
UK Albums (Official Charts)	87
UK R&B Albums (Official Charts)	15

== Certifications ==
Region	Certification	Certified units/sales
Spain (Promusicae)	Gold	50,000^{^}
^{^} Shipments figures based on certification alone.
