= Vernie Bennett =

British singer (born 1971)

- Born: Vernett Bennett; 17 May 1971 (age 55)
- Origin: London, England
- Genres: R&B
- Occupations: Singer, lawyer
- Instrument: Vocals
- Years active: 1992–present

Vernett "Vernie" Bennett (born 17 May 1971) is an English singer. She is a founding member of R&B girl group Eternal, with her sister Easther Bennett also a member. The original line-up included Kéllé Bryan and Louise Nurding.

Eternal were formed in 1992 and originally consisted of the Bennett sisters, Kéllé Bryan, and Louise Nurding (now known as Louise Redknapp). They became a trio in 1995 when Nurding quit the group to start a solo career, and a duo in 1998 when Bryan was controversially dismissed. The group eventually disbanded in 2000 after selling 10 million records worldwide. After the split, Vernie went back to university to complete her law degree and has since settled down to family life with her husband and two children. She has occasionally appeared on British television shows, both as a presenter and as a guest.

== Life and career ==
Born in 1971, she was brought up in Croydon, South London. As a child, she sang in a gospel choir with her sister, Easther.

=== Eternal ===
The band was formed in 1991 and released their first single "Stay" in 1993 which achieved their first top-10 hit in the UK and their first top-20 hit on the American Billboard Hot 100 chart.

Nominated for four Brit Awards, the band performed on the soundtrack for Disney's 1996 film The Hunchback of Notre Dame, and had several hit songs. They sang for the Pope in the Vatican, took part in the anti-apartheid movement by performing at one of Johannesburg's largest outdoor concert with Midnight Oil, Sting and other well-known artists in South Africa and featured on a Pepsi campaign. The band sold more than 10 million records and achieved their first number one in 1997.

A total number of five albums were released throughout the band's career: Always and Forever, Power of a Woman, Before the Rain, Greatest Hits, and Eternal. In 1998, Kéllé Bryan was dismissed by the Bennett sisters' solicitor, and the latter self-entitled album and its lead single "What'cha Gonna Do" only included Vernie and her sister, before the group disbanded altogether. In December 2013, it was announced that Eternal would be reforming for the second series of the ITV2 reality-documentary The Big Reunion. The reunion on ITV2 led to the group performing a number of select gigs in 2014.

In September 2023, Louise Redknapp and her team reported that Easther and Vernie had refused to perform at a number of LGBTQ+ Pride events as part of an Eternal reunion tour. Denis Ingoldsby stated that the Bennett sisters have supported the LGBT community and played many events. Ingoldsby went on to state Louise has "thrown the girls under the bus" and "is trying to get the sisters cancelled". Vernie stated that she had concerns about trans activists and ideology and its impact on women and children. In 2024, Christel Lakhdar joined the group. In an interview on BBC London radio with Jacqueline Shepherd, the sisters talked about their new member and how excited they are to be playing festival gigs in Summer 2024. 2024 saw the return of Eternal with a new band member. A number of dates were planned for 2025.

=== Podcast ===
Vernie launched a podcast Big Chat Small Talk on all major audio platforms including Apple Podcasts with friend and co-host Louise Anderson. The podcast launched in June 2024 and within the first week of launching, secured a top-10 position in the UK at the end of the week.

=== Television ===
Vernie was voted one of the top 50 sexiest women in FHM, and in 1998 featured on the front cover of Pride Magazine. She was a TV presenter for Songs of Praise, Gala Bingo and at the MTV Music Awards.

On 25 November 2015, Bennett appeared with her husband Bryan on ITV's game show All Star Mr & Mrs and raised a further £30,000 for charity, which she donated to Cancer Research UK and CMV Action UK.

During the 2015/2016 Christmas season, she took her debut acting role on stage in Jack and the Beanstalk as the "Spirit of the Beans", and continues to be a supporter of the charity known as CMV Action UK.

In 2018, she was a guest on the ITV game show Big Star's Little Star.

== Personal life ==
After the split, Vernie went back to university to finish studying law and has since become a practising lawyer. In 2006, she gave birth to her first child. In August 2010, she signed with ASM Artist Management. She lives in London with her husband and their two children.
