= What'cha Gonna Do =

1999 single by Eternal

Single by Eternal

from the album Eternal
- Released: 18 October 1999
- Recorded: 1999
- Genre: R&B
- Length: 4:09
- Label: EMI
- Songwriters: Easther Bennett, Vernie Bennett
- Producers: Troy Taylor, Charles Farrar

Eternal singles chronology
"Angel of Mine" (1998)	"What'cha Gonna Do" (1999)

Alternative cover
- UK CD2

"What'cha Gonna Do" is a song by British R&B girl group Eternal. It was the lead (and only) single from their final studio album Eternal, and subsequently their last single before they split. It was the only single released from the group as a duo (consisting of sisters Easther & Vernie Bennett).

== Release ==
"What'cha Gonna Do" was released as a CD single on 18 October 1999. The single managed to chart at Number 16 on the UK Singles Chart making it their only single not to reach the Top 15. It also managed to peak at No.29 in Japan, No.30 on the Dutch Top 40 & No.34 in Sweden. "What'cha Gonna Do" also peaked at No.84 in Germany.

== Music video ==
The video is set out in a desert at night. The desert appears to be on a different planet as the girls float around through parts of the video. Easther and Vernie are seen in numerous outfits throughout the song and they also take part in a dance routine. At the end of the video, the girls fly up to camera and sing the last line of the song, "Ain't nowhere to run, when he's looking for you..."

== Track listings ==
UK CD single

1. "What'cha Gonna Do"
2. "We're Not Making Love Anymore"
3. "Got to Be the One"

UK mixes single

1. "What'cha Gonna Do" (The Beatmasters Remix)
2. "What'cha Gonna Do" (Masters at Work Remix)
3. "What'cha Gonna Do" (Lisa Marie Experience Remix)
4. "What'cha Gonna Do" (Characters Remix)

== Charts ==
Chart (1999)	Peak position
Belgium (Ultratip Bubbling Under Flanders)	10
Belgium (Ultratip Bubbling Under Wallonia)	8
Germany (GfK)	84
Netherlands (Dutch Top 40)	30
Netherlands (Single Top 100)	50
Scottish Singles Sales (Official Charts)	29
Sweden (Sverigetopplistan)	34
UK Singles (Official Charts)	16
UK Airplay (Music Week)	29
UK Hip Hop/R&B (Official Charts)	4
