= Kwasi Jones Martin =

- Also known as: Kwasi Jones, The Monk, Eddie Martin
- Born: Edward Kwasi Martin
- Origin: London, England
- Genres: Hip-Hop, R&B, Pop and Rock
- Occupation(s): Record producer, songwriter, singer, musician
- Instrument(s): Guitar, bass guitar, keyboards, vocals, beatboxing, vocoder, drums
- Years active: 1996–present

Edward Kwasi Martin, better known as Eddie Martin or Kwasi Jones Martin, is an English musician, songwriter and producer. He is the founder of several production teams and recording groups. He has written and produced music for numerous artists and has his own publishing label, Monastery Music Group.

== Producing and writing ==
Earlier in his career Martin's talents caught the attention of record producer Mykaell Riley. Martin worked as a programmer and researcher for Riley while studying a degree in commercial music, at the University of Westminster. During this time he worked with such as Mark Morrison, Peter Andre, Maria Rowe, MN8 and China Black. It was around this period that he produced demos for Livingston Brown, Gary Benson, Glen Goldsmith and Dionne Bernard (Infinity) – who was signed to RCA Records.

== Groups and production teams ==
His work led him to collaborate in a number of groups and production teams. His first was a gospel act called 5 in 1, which was formed with his long term friend Muyiwa and produced in partnership with Qura Rankin.

In 2002, was the formation of Klinik Music Production. Martin along with Kenny Yeomans and Patrick Jacobs collaborated to bring a number of nu soul artists to the forefront of the music industry in Europe. This resulted in Klinik Music Production winning an EMMA Award for producing Tasha's World self entitled debut album.

In the same year, Martin teamed up for a second time with Muyiwa to form the gospel act Riversongz. He co-wrote and produced three albums over a period of six years including Restoration, Declaring His Power and Declaring His Love. It was with Declaring His Love in 2008 that Riversongz achieved a number one slot in HMV's album chart, becoming the fastest selling gospel album to be sold by this music store. To date the albums Declaring His Power and Declaring His Love have sold in excess of 80,000 combined units.

He formed the production teams Ashanti Boyz, Afroganic and Monk & Prof in 2007, with Kwame aka "Tha Prof". This collaboration has seen him produce a number of remixes for Jennifer Lopez's "Hold It" and the Duran Duran single "Falling Down".

Martin has worked with a number of chart topping acts such as Eternal, Sarah Connor, Tasha's World, Bootsy Collins, Prince Mydas, Simon Webbe and Il Divo.

== Discography ==
=== Written, produced or featured ===
- Eternal – If She Breaks Your Heart – EMI
- Sarah Connor – Magic Ride – SonyBMG
- Sarah Connor – Imagining – SonyBMG
- Sarah Connor – I Can't Lie – SonyBMG
- Tasha's World – Tasha's World (Album) – Dome Records
- Tasha's World – World Domination (Album) – Dome Records
- Bianca – Warner Records – UK
- Mark D'Angelo – Crazy – UK
- Martina Balogova – Pop Idol Winner – SonyBMG
- Alex Cartañá – Alex Cartana (Album) – EMI
- Prince Mydas – Prince Mydas (Album) – MOBA
- Riversongz – Restoration (Album) – UK
- Riversongz – Declaring His Power (Album) – UK
- Riversongz – Declaring His Love (Album) – UK
- Amaree – I'll Get By – Chet Records
- Amaree – Looser in love – Chet Records
- Lee-Cabrera – Shake It (Move a Little Closer) – Credence
- Simon Webbe – Star – Innocent Records
- Ill Divo – Ancora – Syco Music/SonyBMG
- Dycce – Concord Records – UK
- Soulscyde – Inclusive (Album) – UK
- Dionne – Dear Diary – Kandi Ent – USA
- Best in Black Music – Dance Cinderfella – Germany
- Terry Walker – Drawing (Remix) – Def Jam

=== Tours and television ===
- Vanessa Mea – Played second keyboards – UK & Europe Tour
- Omar – keyboards – Flava, Channel 4

=== Remix ===
- Chris Brown – "Wall to Wall" Ashanti Boyz Remix
- Chris Brown – "With You" Ashanti Boyz Remix
- Chris Brown – "Forever" Ashanti Boyz Remix
- Jennifer Lopez – "Hold it" Ashanti Boyz Remix
- Jennifer Lopez – "Do it Well" Ashanti Boyz Remix
- Duran Duran – "Falling Down" Ashanti Boyz Remix
- Westlife – "Home" Ashanti Boyz Remix
- Westlife – "Already there" Ashanti Boyz Remix
- Celine Dion – "Eyes on You" Ashanti Boyz Remix
- Kat Deluna – "Run the Show" Ashanti Boyz Remix
- Shayne Ward – "Breathless" Ashanti Boyz Remix
- The Script – "We Cry" Ashanti Boyz Remix
- The Hoosiers – "Cops and Robbers" Ashanti Boyz Remix
- Backstreet Boys – "Inconsolable" Ashanti Boyz Remix
- Fantasia – "When I see you" Afroganic Remix – Arista
- Jennifer Hudson – "Spotlight" Afroganic Remix – Arista
- John Legend – "Green Light" Afroganic Remix – SonyBMG
- John Legend – " Every Body Knows" Afroganic Remix – SonyBMG
- Usher – "Trading Places" Monk & Prof Remix – LaFace, Arista
- Jordin Sparks – "Tattoo" Monk & Prof (Afroganic) Remix – Jive Records
- Suga Rush Beat – "Love" Afroganic KJ Remix – RCA
- Sean Kingston – "Take you there" – AfroganicJK Remix – Epic
- Ciara feat. T-Pain – "Go Girl" – AfroganicJK Remix – Zomba
- Madcon- "Beggin" – AfroganicJK Remix – RCA
- Annie Lennox – "Sing" AfroganicKJ Remix – SonyBMG
- Natasha – "Hey Hey Hey" AfroganicKJ Remix – Jive
- The Script – "We Cry" AfroganicKJ Remix – SonyBMG
- Eamon – "Bring Him Home" AfroganicKJ Remix – Jive
- Fried – "I'll Be There" AfroganicKJ Remix – SonyBMG
- Prince Mydas – "Real Hardcore" AfroganicKJ Mix – Moba
- Madcon Liar -(Monk & Prof Remix) RCA 2008
- Lemar -Weight of the World-Monk & Prof
- Jazmine Sullivan -"Dream – Monk & Prof
- Zarif -"Let Me Back" RCA

=== Film and television compositions ===
- Back Home Again – film soundtrack
- Addictions of Sin: WH Auden in His Own Words – BBC
