= Shangri-La Plaza (TV pilot) =

1990 television pilot directed by Nick Castle

- Genre: Musical comedy
- Created by: Mark Mueller; Nick Castle
- Written by: Nick Castle; Mark Mueller; Craig Safan
- Directed by: Nick Castle
- Starring: Melora Hardin; Chris Sarandon; Terrence Mann; Carmen Lundy; Savion Glover; Allison Mack; Jeff Yagher
- Country of origin: United States
- Original language: English
- No. of seasons: 1
- No. of episodes: 1

Production
- Executive producers: Craig Safan; Nick Castle; Mark Mueller
- Producers: Stephen Cragg; Mark Horowitz
- Production companies: CBS Entertainment Productions; Castle/Safan/Mueller Productions

Original release
- Release: July 30 – July 30, 1990

Shangri-La Plaza is a musical-comedy pilot made for CBS in 1990.

It was directed by Nick Castle and written and created by Mark Mueller and Nick Castle. It starred The Office’s Melora Hardin, Academy Award Nominee Chris Sarandon, jazz singer Carmen Lundy, and Broadway's original Beast and Javert (of Beauty and the Beast and Les Misérables) Terrence Mann, a two-time Tony Award Nominee for Best Actor. It also featured Tony Award-winning choreographer and tap dancer Savion Glover in one of his first television appearances, as well as eight-year-old Allison Mack, of Smallville fame. Michael Peters, a Tony Award winner for his work on Broadway's Dreamgirls, was the choreographer.

Called a cult musical in a 2020 feature article in Los Angeles Magazine titled "Shangri-La Plaza, the Star-Studded All-Musical Sitcom Time Forgot," the all-sung 30 minute television show's history was recounted by the stars and creators in honor of its 30th anniversary.

Shangri-La Plaza was filmed on location in an actual mini-mall at the corner of Vineland Avenue and Burbank Boulevard in North Hollywood, California. Its colorful design was the topic of a Washington Post story in 1990 describing its cultural and architectural impact on the Los Angeles neighborhood in which it was set. Emmy Award-winning art director Jeremy Railton, best-known for his work on Pee-Wee's Playhouse, was responsible for the set design.

The full episode is available on YouTube.
