= All Star Mr & Mrs =

British TV game show (2008–2016)

- Presented by: Phillip Schofield; Fern Britton
- Announcer: Peter Dickson
- Country of origin: United Kingdom
- Original language: English
- No. of series: 8
- No. of episodes: 73 (inc. 6 specials + 1 unaired)

Production
- Running time: 60 minutes (inc. adverts)
- Production company: CPL Productions (Note: Known in the first series as Celador Productions)

Original release
- Network: ITV
- Release: 12 April 2008 – 18 December 2016

Related
- Mr. and Mrs.

All Star Mr & Mrs is a British television show that first began airing on 12 April 2008 on ITV. It is a celebrity revival of the original Mr. and Mrs. that aired on ITV from 1968 to 1988 with two separate revivals in 1995–1996 and 1999 and was also based on the Canadian game show of the same name. The programme is hosted by Phillip Schofield, although Fern Britton had co-hosted the show with Schofield between 2008 and 2010. The show features celebrities and their real-life partners playing to win up to £30,000 for their chosen charities.

On 13 August 2017, it was reported that the series would be rested for a year, with ITV taking the series off their TV schedule for 2017. It was also rumoured that the programme could be axed altogether. The show did not return.

== Format ==
=== Round 1 ===
The first round is the personal couples round. The celebrity will answer three questions about their partner while their partner is in the soundproof booth wearing headphones and a blindfold to prevent them from seeing and hearing their partner's answers. Once all three questions are answered, their partner will join them and have to match as many answers as they can to their partners.

All three couples play this first round.

=== Round 2 ===
Each couple is placed inside a sight-proof booth so that they cannot see one another. They must answer six questions using their paddles (blue for male and pink for female). The more answers they match, the more chance they have of going through to the final.

Again, all three couples do this. However, at the end of this round, the winning couple is announced and they go through to the final. The other couples each receive a carriage clock and receive £5,000 for their favorite charity.

=== Round 3 ===
This time, the winning celebrity must enter the booth wearing headphones and a blindfold while their partner answers four questions. For every answer that they match correctly on the first three questions, they win £5,000 for their chosen charity, £15,000 if all three are matched. If they match the fourth and final question, they will double any money earned on the first three questions, up to £30,000.

== Transmissions ==
=== Series ===
Series	Start date	End date	Episodes	Host	
1	12 April 2008	31 May 2008	8	Fern Britton	Phillip Schofield
2	2 May 2009	27 June 2009	9	Fern Britton	Phillip Schofield
3	2 January 2010	4 April 2010	10	Fern Britton	Phillip Schofield
4	5 September 2012	7 November 2012	10	Phillip Schofield	
5	1 May 2013	11 August 2013	13	Phillip Schofield	
6	11 June 2014	6 August 2014	8	Phillip Schofield	
7	30 September 2015	25 November 2015	8	Phillip Schofield	
8	31 August 2016	12 October 2016	7	Phillip Schofield	

=== Specials ===
Date	Entitle
20 December 2008	Christmas Special
25 December 2009	Christmas Special
21 December 2012	Text Santa Special
2013	Christmas Special
20 December 2015	Christmas Special
18 December 2016	Christmas Special

== Episode guide ==
=== Series 1 (2008) ===
Episode	Couple 1	Couple 2	Couple 3	Original air date
1	Phil Tufnell with wife Dawn	Wendy Richard with partner John	Shane Lynch with wife Sheena	12 April 2008
2	William Roache with wife Sara	Joe Calzaghe with partner Jo-Emma	Lembit Öpik with partner Gabriela Irimia	19 April 2008
3	Julie Goodyear with husband Scott	Danny Dyer with partner Joanne	Christopher Biggins with partner Neil	26 April 2008
4	Vic Reeves with wife Nancy Sorrell	David Coulthard with partner Karen	Mark Berry with partner Monica	3 May 2008
5	Vicky Entwistle with husband Andy	Kenny Dalglish with wife Marina	Dominic Wood with wife Sandi	10 May 2008
6	Anthony Head with wife Sarah	David Dickinson with wife Lorne	Natasha Hamilton with husband Riad	17 May 2008
7	Heidi Range with partner Dave Berry	Laurence Llewelyn-Bowen with wife Jackie	Michael Howard with wife Sandra	24 May 2008
8	Robin Gibb with wife Dwina	Steve Backley with wife Clare	Theo Walcott with partner Melanie	31 May 2008

=== Christmas Special (2008) ===
Couple 1	Couple 2	Couple 3	Original air date
Ronan Keating with wife Yvonne Connolly	Terry Venables with wife Yvette	Tamzin Outhwaite with husband Tom Ellis	20 December 2008

=== Series 2 (2009) ===
Episode	Couple 1	Couple 2	Couple 3	Original air date
1	Brigitte Nielsen with husband Mattia	Peter Shilton with wife Sue	Keith Duffy with wife Lisa	2 May 2009
2	Rick Parfitt with wife Lyndsey	Ulrika Jonsson with husband Brian	Alan Halsall with fiancée Lucy-Jo Hudson	9 May 2009
3	Donal MacIntyre with wife Ameera	Eamonn Holmes with fiancée Ruth Langsford	Sharon Small with partner Dan Bridge	16 May 2009
4	Tina Hobley with husband Oliver	Brian Blessed with wife Hildegarde Neil	Gary Lucy with partner Natasha	23 May 2009
5	Liz Dawn with husband Don	Morten Harket with partner Inez	Matt Willis with wife Emma Willis	30 May 2009
6	Jimmy Osmond with wife Michelle	Willie Thorne with wife Jill	Rita Simons with husband Theo	6 June 2009
7	Anne Kirkbride with husband Dave	Sir Stirling Moss with wife Susie	Michael Underwood with partner Angellica Bell	13 June 2009
8	John Thomson with wife Samantha	Gaynor Faye with partner Mark	Goldie with wife Mika	20 June 2009
9	Lord David Steel with wife Judy	Shaun Williamson with wife Melanie	Keisha Buchanan with partner Dean	27 June 2009
10	Angela Griffin with husband Jason	Tito Jackson with partner Sonia	Andrew Castle with wife Sophia	N/A^{1}

^1 Episode 10 was originally due to air as the final episode of the second series on 4 July 2009. However, the death of Michael Jackson prevented the episode's broadcast, as his brother, Tito Jackson was seen laughing about him in it. The episode was pulled as it was deemed too insensitive to air the footage so soon after his death.

=== Christmas Special (2009) ===
Couple 1	Couple 2	Couple 3	Original air date
Joan Collins with husband Percy	Emma Bunton with partner Jade Jones	Andrew Whyment with wife Nichola	25 December 2009

=== Series 3 (2010) ===
Episode	Couple 1	Couple 2	Couple 3	Original air date
1	Holly Willoughby with husband Dan	Boris Becker with wife Sharlely	Judith Chalmers with husband Neil Durden-Smith	2 January 2010
2	Jack P. Shepherd with fiancée Lauren	Ice-T with wife Coco Austin	Carol Smillie with husband Alex	9 January 2010
3	Kirsty Gallacher with fiancé Paul Sampson	Michael Buerk with wife Christine	Gary Lineker with wife Danielle Bux	16 January 2010
4	Lynda Bellingham with husband Michael	Jean-Christophe Novelli with fiancée Michelle	Samantha Womack with husband Mark Womack	23 January 2010
5	Beverley Callard with husband Jon	Mikey Graham with wife Karen	Noddy Holder with wife Suzan	30 January 2010
6	Robert Webb with wife Abigail	Andrew Sachs with wife Melody	Anthea Turner with husband Grant Bovey	6 February 2010
7	George Takei with husband Brad	Lucy Pargeter with husband Rudi	Phil Vickery with wife Kate	13 February 2010
8	Barry McGuigan with wife Sandra	Suzi Perry with husband Bastien	Simon Gregson with fiancée Emma	20 February 2010
9	Jenni Falconer with fiancé James	John Higgins with wife Denise	Bobby Ball with wife Yvonne	27 February 2010
10	Gareth Gates with wife Suzanne	Denise Welch with husband Tim Healy	Nicholas Parsons with wife Ann	4 April 2010

=== Series 4 (2012) ===
After a two-year break, it was announced by CPL Productions that All Star Mr & Mrs would return for a new series airing on ITV during the autumn of 2012. This time, the show was presented solely by Schofield. Stephen Mulhern took over as host of the Text Santa special as Schofield played the game with his wife Steph.

Episode	Couple 1	Couple 2	Couple 3	Original air date
1	Nicky Byrne with wife Georgina	Patsy Palmer with husband Richard	John Prescott with wife Pauline	5 September 2012
2	Antony Cotton with partner Peter	Michael Owen with wife Louise	Rachel Stevens with husband Alex	12 September 2012
3	Warwick Davis with wife Sammy	Jane Seymour with husband James Keach	Brendan Cole with wife Zoe	19 September 2012
4	Jo Joyner with husband Neil	Shaun Ryder with wife Joanne	Janine Duvitski with husband Paul	26 September 2012
5	Claire Richards with husband Reece	Des O'Connor with wife Jodie	Rufus Hound with wife Beth	3 October 2012
6	Martin Kemp with wife Shirlie Holliman	Jennifer Ellison with husband Rob	Paul Daniels with wife Debbie McGee	10 October 2012
7	Paddy McGuinness with wife Christine McGuinness	Nadia Sawalha with husband Mark	Neil Dudgeon with wife Mary	17 October 2012
8	Les Dennis with wife Claire	Paula Lane with fiancé Tom	John Barnes with wife Andrea	24 October 2012
9	Matthew Wolfenden with fiancée Charley Webb	Kate Silverton with husband Mike	Stacey Solomon with fiancé Aaron	31 October 2012
10	Lisa Maxwell with fiancé Paul	Harry Judd with fiancée Izzy	Sian Reeves with partner Jeremy	7 November 2012

=== Text Santa Special (2012) ===
Couple	Original air date
Phillip Schofield with wife Steph	21 December 2012

=== Series 5 (2013) ===
Episode	Couple 1	Couple 2	Couple 3	Original air date
1	Julie Hesmondhalgh with husband Ian Kershaw	Dave Myers with wife Lilianna	Tom Fletcher with wife Giovanna Fletcher	1 May 2013
2	Toyah Willcox with husband Robert Fripp	Gabby Logan with husband Kenny Logan	Jake Wood with wife Alison	8 May 2013
3	Jennie McAlpine with partner Chris	Sally Gunnell with husband Jon	Joey Essex with fiancée Sam Faiers	22 May 2013
4	Will Mellor with wife Michelle	Michael Brandon with wife Glynis Barber	Abz Love with girlfriend Vicky	5 June 2013
5	Ricky Tomlinson with wife Rita	Paula Radcliffe with husband Gary Lough	Ola Jordan with husband James Jordan	12 June 2013
6	Angela Griffin with husband Jason Milligan	Kim Woodburn with husband Peter	Ed Byrne with wife Claire	19 June 2013
7	Sally Dynevor with husband Tim	Eddie "The Eagle" Edwards with wife Samantha	JB Gill with girlfriend Chloe	26 June 2013
8	Sally Lindsay with partner Steve White	Ruth Madoc with husband John	Gary Rhodes with wife Jennie	7 July 2013
9	Una Healy with husband Ben Foden	Yvette Fielding with husband Karl Beattie	Eddie Large with wife Patsy	14 July 2013
10	Sheree Murphy with husband Harry Kewell	Diarmuid Gavin with wife Justine	Johnny Ball with wife Di	21 July 2013
11	Nina Wadia with husband Raiomond	Luke Campbell with fiancée Lynsey	Trudie Goodwin with husband Kit	28 July 2013
12	Ray Quinn with wife Emma	John Stapleton with wife Lynn Faulds Wood	Carrie Grant with husband David Grant	4 August 2013
13	Jane Danson with husband Robert Beck	Colin Baker with wife Marion	Michaela Strachan with partner Nick	11 August 2013

=== Christmas Special (2013) ===
Couple 1	Couple 2	Couple 3	Original air date
Jane McDonald with fiancé Ed	Natalie Anderson with husband James	Jimmy Tarbuck with wife Pauline	N/A

=== Series 6 (2014) ===
The sixth series was recorded in March 2014 and premiered on 11 June 2014.

Episode	Couple 1	Couple 2	Couple 3	Original air date
1	David Hasselhoff with partner Hayley	Amanda Lamb with husband Sean	Brian McFadden with wife Vogue Williams	11 June 2014
2	Johnny Vegas with wife Maia Dunphy	Kimberley Walsh with partner Justin	Chris Bisson with partner Row	18 June 2014
3	Nigel Havers with wife Georgiana	Kian Egan with wife Jodi Albert	Paul Ince with wife Claire	25 June 2014
4	Charlie Condou with partner Cameron	Nerys Hughes with husband Patrick	Scott Robinson with wife Kerry	2 July 2014
5	Liam Fox with wife Nicole Barber-Lane	Vanessa Feltz with fiancé Ben Ofoedu	Danny Jones with fiancée Georgia	16 July 2014
6	Kaye Adams with partner Ian	Sue Holderness with husband Mark	Vincent Simone with fiancée Susan	23 July 2014
7	Terry Alderton with wife Dee	Gregor Fisher with wife Vicki	Kéllé Bryan with husband Jay	30 July 2014
8	Matthew Wright with wife Amelia	Debbie Rush with husband Andrew	Tony Jacklin with wife Astrid	6 August 2014

=== Series 7 (2015) ===
The seventh series was recorded from 27 June to 1 July 2015 and premiered on 30 September 2015.

Episode	Couple 1	Couple 2	Couple 3	Original air date
1	Jimi Mistry with wife Flavia Cacace	Martina Navratilova with wife Julia Lemigova	Sean Fletcher with wife Luned	30 September 2015
2	Catherine Tyldesley with fiancé Tom	Matt Dawson with wife Carolin	Tinchy Stryder with partner Helen	7 October 2015
3	Kelvin Fletcher with fiancée Elizabeth	Gemma Merna with husband Ian	Mr Motivator with wife Palmer	14 October 2015
4	Quentin Willson with wife Michaela	Jermaine Jenas with wife Ellie	Billie Faiers with fiancé Greg	21 October 2015
5	Rochelle Humes with husband Marvin Humes	Vicki Michelle with husband Graham	Tom Parker with partner Kelsey	28 October 2015
6	Chris Chittell with fiancée Lesley Dunlop	Tessa Sanderson with husband Densign	Rylan Clark with fiancé Dan Neal	4 November 2015
7	Mikey North with fiancée Rachael	Cheryl Baker with husband Steve	Martin Offiah with fiancée Virginia	18 November 2015
8	Carl Fogarty with wife Michaela	Vernie Bennett with husband Bryan	Alex Brooker with wife Lynsey	25 November 2015

=== Christmas Special (2015) ===
Couple 1	Couple 2	Couple 3	Original air date
Martine McCutcheon with husband Jack McManus	Harry Redknapp with wife Sandra	Gwyneth Strong with husband Jesse Birdsall	20 December 2015

=== Series 8 (2016) ===
An eighth series of All Star Mr & Mrs was recorded from 7 to 10 July 2016 and aired from 31 August 2016.

Episode	Couple 1	Couple 2	Couple 3	Original air date
1	Adam Thomas with fiancé Caroline	Kevin Clifton with wife Karen Clifton	Ian Lavender with wife Michèle	31 August 2016
2	Tristan Gemmill with wife Emily Hamilton	Peter Davison with wife Elizabeth	Amanda Byram with husband Julian	7 September 2016
3	Paul Potts with wife Julz	Kellie Bright with husband Paul	Freddie Flintoff with wife Rachael	14 September 2016
4	Tina O'Brien with fiancé Adam	Chris Hollins with wife Sarah	Sunetra Sarker with partner Scott	21 September 2016
5	Jason Watkins with wife Clara	Fiona O'Carroll with husband Martin	Ben Hanlin with wife Briony	28 September 2016
6	Charlotte Hawkins with husband Mark	Wayne Sleep with husband José	Matt Le Tissier with wife Angela	5 October 2016
7	Audley Harrison with wife Raychel	Nicky Clarke with partner Kelly	Andrea McLean with husband Nick	12 October 2016

=== Christmas Special (2016) ===
Couple 1	Couple 2	Couple 3	Original air date
Lennox Lewis with wife Violet	Carol Decker with husband Richard	Dominic Brunt with wife Joanne Mitchell	18 December 2016
