= I Wanna Be the Only One =

1997 single by Eternal

Single by Eternal featuring BeBe Winans

from the album Before the Rain
- B-side: "A Friend Is a Friend"; "Show Me"
- Released: 19 May 1997
- Genre: R&B; gospel
- Length: 4:18 (album version); 3:36 (radio edit)
- Label: EMI; 1st Avenue
- Songwriters: BeBe Winans; James "Rhett" Lawrence
- Producer: Nigel Lowis

Eternal singles chronology
"Don't You Love Me" (1997)	"I Wanna Be the Only One" (1997)	"Angel of Mine" (1997)

Alternative cover
- UK CD2

"I Wanna Be the Only One" is a song by British R&B girl group Eternal and American R&B/gospel singer BeBe Winans, released in May 1997 by EMI and 1st Avenue Records as the third single from the group's third album, Before the Rain (1997). Topping the UK Singles Chart, the release also became the group's third collaboration with Winans, who had written and produced their 1994 single "Crazy" (from Always & Forever) and the song "It Will Never End" (from their 1995 album Power of a Woman). The single became the group's 11th non-consecutive top-10 entry on the UK Singles Chart. Its music video was directed by Randee St. Nicholas.

"I Wanna Be the Only One" became Eternal's biggest hit to date; it was the third most-played song on British radio. It earned Eternal a MOBO Award and Capital FM Award for Best Single. It was also nominated for Best Single at the BRIT Awards. As of May 2019, the song has sold 728,000 copies in the UK. In June 2019, "I Wanna Be the Only One" was ranked at number 28 on the Official Charts Company's "Top 100 Girl Band Singles of the Last 25 Years".

== Critical reception ==
Scottish Daily Record named "I Wanna Be the Only One" Single of the Week and a "classy" number. The Mirror's Kate Thornton praised it as "a feelgood duet" that "could even be their first number one." A reviewer from Music Week gave it a score of four out of five, describing it as "a gloriously commercial, uptempo tune. The result is superb and another top five hit." The magazine's Alan Jones called it "another surefire winner", "wherein the girls have a foil in the form of BeBe Winans. Bebe's rich gospel tones perfectly complement Eternal's on a smooth, perky, maddeningly commercial pop nugget which makes fine use of brass over a funky groove which moves at quite a pace."

Claudia Connell from News of the World felt it is "a perfect summer song with a gentle gospel sound that shows off four lots of fine vocals." New Straits Times declared it as "an immediately winning tune, lively and catchy. Winans' strong masculine voice contrasts nicely with the girls svelte voices - dig the breathy Yeh-yeh-yeh-yehs, and the call and response sections." Alex Needham from Smash Hits wrote that "I Wanna Be the Only One" "is a toon so cheerful it would bring a smile to the Cheddar Gorge". Ian Hyland from Sunday Mirror gave the song eight out of ten, noting that "Eternal go seriously gospel with the soul legend that is BeBe Winans. The girls can do no wrong at the moment and if they don't crack America with the new stuff then they may as well give up. Top dance remixes as well."

== Music video ==
A music video was produced to promote the single, directed by Randee St. Nicholas. It features the group performing in a basement, with a group of females surrounding them. Winans are surrounded by a group of men. These are battling each other. In the end, they all stand together, laughing into the camera. The video was filmed in Islington, London.

== Track listings ==
- UK CD1
1. "I Wanna Be the Only One"
2. "A Friend Is a Friend"
3. "Show Me"
4. "Don't You Love Me" (French remix)
- UK CD2 – The Mixes
1. "I Wanna Be the Only One"
2. "I Wanna Be the Only One" (Black Box Lelewel 'Til the End mix)
3. "I Wanna Be the Only One" (Paul Gotel Dark Skies mix)
4. "I Wanna Be the Only One" (SPS Cained mix)
5. "I Wanna Be the Only One" (Blacksmith "Eternal's Mix Tape")
- UK cassette single
1. "I Wanna Be the Only One"
2. "A Friend Is a Friend"
3. "Don't You Love Me" (French remix)
- European CD single
1. "I Wanna Be the Only One"
2. "Don't You Love Me" (French remix)
- Australian CD single
1. "I Wanna Be the Only One"
2. "A Friend Is a Friend"
3. "Show Me"
4. "Don't You Love Me" (Tyme club remix)

== Charts ==
=== Weekly charts ===
Chart (1997–1998)	Peak position
Australia (ARIA)	10
Austria (Ö3 Austria Top 40)	6
Belgium (Ultratop 50 Flanders)	7
Belgium (Ultratop 50 Wallonia)	16
Denmark (IFPI)	13
Estonia (Eesti Top 20)	15
Europe (Eurochart Hot 100)	6
Europe (European Hit Radio)	3
France (SNEP)	6
Germany (GfK)	14
Hungary (Mahasz)	7
Iceland (Íslenski Listinn Topp 40)	27
Israel (Israeli Singles Chart)	5
Ireland (IRMA)	3
Netherlands (Dutch Top 40)	3
Netherlands (Single Top 100)	4
New Zealand (Recorded Music NZ)	4
Norway (VG-lista)	2
Poland Airplay (Music & Media)	6
Scottish Singles Sales (Official Charts)	1
Sweden (Sverigetopplistan)	6
Switzerland (Schweizer Hitparade)	7
UK Singles (Official Charts)	1
UK Airplay (Music Week)	1
UK Hip Hop/R&B (Official Charts)	1
UK Club Chart (Music Week)	1

Chart (2021)	Peak position
Poland Airplay (ZPAV)	74

=== Year-end charts ===
Chart (1997)	Position
Belgium (Ultratop 50 Flanders)	34
Belgium (Ultratop 50 Wallonia)	58
Europe (Eurochart Hot 100)	24
Europe (European Hit Radio)	13
France (SNEP)	32
Germany (Media Control)	61
Netherlands (Dutch Top 40)	15
Netherlands (Single Top 100)	12
New Zealand (RIANZ)	14
Norway (VG-lista)	14
Romania (Romanian Top 100)	75
Sweden (Topplistan)	25
Switzerland (Schweizer Hitparade)	11
UK Singles (OCC)	16
UK Airplay (Music Week)	3
UK Club Chart (Music Week)	62

Chart (1998)	Position
Australia (ARIA)	66

== Certifications ==
Region	Certification	Certified units/sales
Australia (ARIA)	Gold	35,000^{^}
Belgium (BRMA)	Gold	25,000^{*}
France (SNEP)	Gold	250,000^{*}
Netherlands (NVPI)	Platinum	75,000^{^}
New Zealand (RMNZ)	Platinum	10,000^{*}
Norway (IFPI Norway)	Platinum	
Sweden (GLF)	Gold	15,000^{^}
United Kingdom (BPI)	Platinum	728,000
^{*} Sales figures based on certification alone.^{^} Shipments figures based on certification alone.
