= The Music of Disney: A Legacy in Song =

1992 compilation album by various artists

The Music of Disney: A Legacy In Song

Compilation album by Various artists
- Released: September 1992
- Recorded: 1928–1991
- Genre: Various
- Label: Walt Disney Records
- Producer: Various

The Music of Disney: A Legacy in Song is a 1992 three-disc set of Disney songs that were originally recorded between 1928 and 1991.

The collection is composed of songs from films, television shows and theme parks including Snow White and the Seven Dwarfs, Bambi, One Hundred and One Dalmatians, The Little Mermaid, The Mickey Mouse Club, and the Walt Disney anthology television series. Released in 1992 by Walt Disney Records, it includes "When You Wish Upon a Star", "Zip-a-Dee-Doo-Dah", "Supercalifragilisticexpialidocious", "Beauty and the Beast" and "It's a Small World".

Singers and performers include Julie Andrews, Dick Van Dyke, Burl Ives, Louis Prima, Maurice Chevalier, Angela Lansbury, Roger Miller, Helen Reddy, Bette Midler, Sean Connery, Kirk Douglas, Annette Funicello, Pearl Bailey and George Bruns.

The collection was nominated for a Grammy Award in 1993 as Best Historical Album: "Music of Disney--A Legacy in Song” (Various), Michael Leon, album producer.

Certified as a gold-selling record by the RIAA in January 1993, it was certified as a platinum-selling recording in March 1995.

== Track list ==
=== Disc 1 ===
1. Turkey in the Straw - From Steamboat Willie - Traditional (1:10)

2. Who's Afraid of the Big Bad Wolf - From Three Little Pigs - Pinto Colvig/Mary Moder/Dorothy Compton/Billy Bletcher (3:07)

3. Heigh-Ho - From Snow White and the Seven Dwarfs - The Dwarf Chorus (2:49)

4. Whistle While You Work - From Snow White and the Seven Dwarfs - Adriana Caselotti (3:24)

5. Some Day My Prince Will Come - From Snow White and the Seven Dwarfs - Adriana Caselotti (1:54)

6. When You Wish Upon a Star - From Pinocchio - Cliff Edwards (3:15)

7. Give a Little Whistle - From Pinocchio - Cliff Edwards/Dickie Jones (1:37)

8. Dance of the Reed Flutes - From Fantasia - The Philadelphia Orchestra/Leopold Stokowski (1:49)

9. Baby Mine - From Dumbo - Betty Noyes (2:07)

10. Love Is a Song - From Bambi - Donald Novis/Disney Studio Chorus (2:56)

11. Little April Shower - From Bambi - Disney Studio Chorus (3:55)

12. Saludos Amigos - From Saludos Amigos - Disney Studio Chorus (1:44)

13. You Belong to My Heart - From The Three Caballeros - Dora Luz (2:21)

14. Zip-A-Dee-Doo-Dah - From Song of the South - James Baskett (2:20)

15. Ev'rybody Has a Laughing Place - From Song of the South - James Baskett/Johnny Lee/Nicodemus Stewart (0:50)

16. The Lord Is Good to Me - From Melody Time - Dennis Day (1:17)

17. Lavender Blue - From So Dear to My Heart - Burl Ives (1:02)

18. A Dream Is a Wish Your Heart Makes - From Cinderella - Ilene Woods (4:36)

19. Bibbidi-Bobbidi-Boo - From Cinderella - Verna Felton (1:18)

20. I'm Late - From Alice in Wonderland - Bill Thompson (0:43)

21. The Unbirthday Song - From Alice in Wonderland - Jerry Colonna/Ed Wynn/Kathryn Beaumont (4:33)

22. The Second Star to the Right - From Peter Pan - The Jud Conlon Chorus (2:21)

23. You Can Fly! - From Peter Pan - Bobby Driscoll/Kathryn Beaumont/Paul Collins/Tommy Luske/The Jud Conlon Chorus (4:25)

24. Bella Notte - From Lady and the Tramp - George Givot/Bill Thompson/Disney Studio Chorus (2:41)

25. Once Upon a Dream - From Sleeping Beauty - Mary Costa/Bill Shirley (2:47)

26. Cruella De Vil - From One Hundred and One Dalmatians - Bill Lee (4:47)

27. Higitus Figitus - From The Sword in the Stone - Karl Swenson/Rickie Sorenson (1:47)

=== Disc 2 ===
1. Supercalifragilisticexpialidocious - From Mary Poppins - Julie Andrews/Dick Van Dyke/The Pearlie Chorus (2:03)

2. A Spoonful of Sugar - From Mary Poppins - Julie Andrews (4:08)

3. Chim Chim Cher-ee - From Mary Poppins - Dick Van Dyke/Julie Andrews/Karen Dotrice/Matthew Garber (2:47)

4. Winnie the Pooh - From Winnie the Pooh and the Honey Tree - Disney Studio Chorus (2:23)

5. The Bare Necessities - From The Jungle Book - Phil Harris/Bruce Reitherman (4:52)

6. I Wan'na Be Like You - From The Jungle Book - Louis Prima/Phil Harris/Bruce Reitherman (4:39)

7. The Aristocats - From The Aristocats - Maurice Chevalier (2:54)

8. Ev'rybody Wants to Be a Cat - From The Aristocats - Phil Harris/Scatman Crothers/Thurl Ravenscroft/Liz English (6:07)

9. The Age of Not Believing - From Bedknobs and Broomsticks - Angela Lansbury (3:16)

10. Nobody's Problems - From Bedknobs and Broomsticks - Angela Lansbury (1:23)

11. Oo-De-Lally - From Robin Hood - Roger Miller (0:59)

12. Someone's Waiting for You - From The Rescuers - Shelby Flint (2:23)

13. Candle on the Water - From Pete's Dragon - Helen Reddy (3:07)

14. Best of Friends - From The Fox and the Hound - Pearl Bailey (2:15)

15. Perfect Isn't Easy - From Oliver & Company - Bette Midler (2:58)

16. Part of Your World - From The Little Mermaid - Jodi Benson (3:14)

17. Under the Sea - From The Little Mermaid - Samuel E. Wright (3:15)

18. Kiss the Girl - From The Little Mermaid - Samuel E. Wright (2:44)

19. Be Our Guest - From Beauty and the Beast - Jerry Orbach/Angela Lansbury (3:45)

20. Beauty and the Beast - From Beauty and the Beast - Angela Lansbury (2:45)

=== Disc 3 ===
1. A Whale of a Tale - From 20,000 Leagues Under the Sea - Kirk Douglas (2:07)

2. Old Yeller - From Old Yeller - Jerome Courtland (2:18)

3. Pretty Irish Girl - From Darby O'Gill and the Little People - Sean Connery (2:13)

4. The Parent Trap - From The Parent Trap - Tommy Sands/Annette Funicello (2:16)

5. Castle in Spain - From Babes in Toyland - Ray Bolger (2:27)

6. Enjoy It! - From In Search of the Castaways - Maurice Chevalier/Hayley Mills (2:08)

7. On the Front Porch - From Summer Magic - Burl Ives (3:24)

8. The Monkey's Uncle - From The Monkey's Uncle - Annette Funicello (2:32)

9. That Darn Cat - From That Darn Cat - Bobby Troup (2:45)

10. Fortuosity - From The Happiest Millionaire - Tommy Steele (3:10)

11. Mickey Mouse March - From The Mickey Mouse Club - The Mouseketeers/Jimmie Dodd (2:41)

12. I'm No Fool - From The Mickey Mouse Club - Cliff Edwards/The Mouseketeers/Disney Studio Chorus (1:45)

13. You (Are a Human Animal) - From The Mickey Mouse Club - Cliff Edwards/Disney Studio Chorus (1:38)

14. Mickey Mouse Club Alma Mater - From The Mickey Mouse Club - The Mouseketeers/Jimmie Dodd (1:48)

15. The Wonderful World of Color - From The Wonderful World of Color - The Wellingtons (1:40)

16. The Spectrum Song - From An Adventure in Color - Paul Frees (1:33)

17. The Ballad of Davy Crockett - From Davy Crockett - The Wellingtons (1:41)

18. The Swamp Fox - From The Swamp Fox - Leslie Nielsen (2:21)

19. Main Title - From The Wonderful World of Disney - George Bruns (1:00)

20. Theme from Zorro - From Zorro - The Wellingtons (1:22)

21. Strummin' Song - From The Horsemasters - Annette Funicello (2:05)

22. Mister Piano Man - From The Golden Horseshoe Revue - Annette Funicello (1:26)

23. DuckTales Theme - From DuckTales - The Disney Afternoon Studio Chorus (2:50)

24. TaleSpin Theme - From TaleSpin - The Disney Afternoon Studio Chorus (2:19)

25. Meet Me Down on Main Street - From Disneyland - The Mellomen (1:44)

26. The Tiki Tiki Tiki Room - From Walt Disney's Enchanted Tiki Room - Wally Boag/Fulton Burley/Thurl Ravenscroft/The Mellomen (2:39)

27. It's a Small World - From It's a Small World - Disney Studio Chorus (3:03)

28. Yo Ho (A Pirate's Life for Me) - From Pirates of the Caribbean - Disney Studio Chorus (4:44)

29. There's a Great Big Beautiful Tomorrow - From Walt Disney's Carousel of Progress - Rex Allen (2:16)

30. Golden Dream - From The American Adventure - Richard Page/Marti McCall (3:51)

31. Main Street Electrical Parade - From Main Street Electrical Parade - Jean Jacques Perrey/Gershon Kingsley (9:16)
