= Good Thing (Eternal song) =

1996 single by Eternal

Single by Eternal

from the album Power of a Woman
- Released: 26 February 1996
- Length: 3:50 (radio edit)
- Label: EMI; 1st Avenue
- Songwriters: David Frank; Jeff Pescetto
- Producers: Dennis Charles; Ronnie Wilson

Eternal singles chronology
"I Am Blessed" (1995)	"Good Thing" (1996)	"Who Are You?" (1996)

Alternative cover
- UK CD2

"Good Thing" is a song by British R&B girl group Eternal, released on 26 February 1996 by EMI and 1st Avenue Records as the third single from their second album, Power of a Woman (1995). The song was written by David Frank and Jeff Pescetto, and produced by Dennis Charles and Ronnie Wilson. It reached No. 8 in the United Kingdom and stayed in the top 100 for eight weeks. "Good Thing" was their seventh non-consecutive top-10 hit in the UK.

== Critical reception ==
Gina Morris from Smash Hits gave the single three out of five, writing, "'Good Thing' strides in with all the cool bass funk of Snoop Doggy Dogg (with decidedly girly vocals), flaunts its thing and saunters out again. The best thing they've ever done by far."

== Track listings ==
- UK CD1 and cassette single
1. "Good Thing" (radio mix)
2. "Stay"
3. "So Good"
4. "Oh Baby I..."
- UK CD2 and Australasian CD single
1. "Good Thing" (radio mix)
2. "Good Thing" (Frankie Knuckles vocal club mix)
3. "Good Thing" (Bottom Dollar vocal club mix)
4. "Good Thing" (D.A.R.C. Velvet mix)

== Credits and personnel ==
Credits are adapted from the Power of a Woman album booklet.

Studio

- Mastered at The Master Room (London, England)

Personnel

- David Frank – writing
- Jeff Pescetto – writing
- Kevin Armstrong – guitar
- Ronnie Wilson – production
- Dennis Charles – production
- Nick Hopkins – recording engineer
- Andy Bradfield – mix engineer
- Ashley Alexander – assistant engineer
- Paul Meehan – programming
- Sam Noel – technician
- Arun Chakraverty – mastering

== Charts ==
Chart (1996)	Peak position
Australia (ARIA)	82
Europe (Eurochart Hot 100)	49
Ireland (IRMA)	23
Scotland Singles (OCC)	20
UK Singles (OCC)	8
UK Hip Hop/R&B (OCC)	1
UK Airplay (Music Week)	15
UK Club Chart (Music Week)	13
