= Before the Rain (Eternal album) =

Studio album by Eternal
- Released: 17 March 1997
- Recorded: 1996–1997
- Genre: R&B; soul; hip-hop soul
- Length: 49:02
- Label: EMI; 1st Avenue
- Producer: Dennis Charles; Ronnie Wilson; Nigel Lowis; Simon Climie; Harvey Mason Jr.

Eternal chronology
Power of a Woman (1995)	Before the Rain (1997)	Greatest Hits (1997)

Singles from Before the Rain
- 1. "Someday" Released: 5 August 1996; 2. "Don't You Love Me" Released: 24 February 1997; 3. "Finally" Released: 16 April 1997 (Japan only); 4. "I Wanna Be the Only One" Released: 19 May 1997; 5. "Think About Me" Released: 25 June 1997 (Japan only)

Professional ratings
Review scores
Source	Rating
AllMusic	3/5 stars
Music Week	4/5 stars
NME	4/10
Smash Hits	4/5 stars

Before the Rain is the third album by the British R&B vocal group Eternal, released on 17 March 1997. The album includes the single "I Wanna Be the Only One" (a duet with BeBe Winans), which became Eternal's first and only number one hit in the United Kingdom. "Someday" and "Don't You Love Me" were also issued as singles, and two other songs, "Finally" and "Think About Me", were released only in Japan. The album features lead vocals from Vernie Bennett ("Think About Me") and Kéllé Bryan ("I'm Still Crying", "All My Love"), and is their last to feature Bryan.

A commercial success, the album went Gold in its first week, debuting with sales of 100,000 copies before being certified Platinum. In June 2019, Before the Rain was ranked at number 35 on the Official Charts Company's list of the "top 40 biggest girl band studio albums of the last 25 years". According to Billboard, a US release was planned for 26 August 1997, featuring 4 additional tracks. "Dreams", produced by Peter Mokran and Emosia was slated as the lead single and was serviced to R&B radio on 9 June 1997.

== Single releases ==
"Someday", which was the theme to Disney's The Hunchback of Notre Dame, was released as a single in 1996, the year before Before the Rain was released. "Don't You Love Me" was released just before the album's release, followed by the duet with American singer BeBe Winans "I Wanna Be the Only One", which reached number one in the UK, becoming Eternal's first and only number one hit there. "How Many Tears" was scheduled for release as a single but plans were dropped due to the future release of the Greatest Hits. Australian version of the album includes the original mix of Dreams. Dreams was intended to be a single in the US where a repackaged version of Before The Rain would've been released, re-titled "Dreams" and including a further two new songs. These are thought to have been "Angel of Mine" and "Talk About It".

== Critical reception and sales ==
Before the Rain received a positive response from music critics and fans and it gained Eternal a MOBO Award. The album peaked at number 3 on the UK Albums Chart and was certified Platinum by the BPI for sales of over 300,000 copies.

== Track listing ==
Before the Rain track listing
No.	Title	Writer(s)	Producer(s)	Length
1.	"Don't You Love Me"	Cynthia Biggs; Carolyn Mitchell; Terence Dudley; Christopher Kellum	Dennis Charles; Ronnie Wilson	3:49
2.	"I Wanna Be the Only One" (duet with BeBe Winans)	Winans; Rhett Lawrence	Andy Bradfield	4:18
3.	"How Many Tears"	St. Paul Peterson; Oliver Leiber	Harvey Mason, Jr.	4:37
4.	"Grace Under Pressure"	Bruce Forest; John Themis; Beverley Skeete; Derek Green; Andy Whitmore	Charles; Wilson	4:41
5.	"Someday"	Alan Menken; Stephen Schwartz	Simon Climie	4:14
6.	"Think About Me" (featuring Basil Reynolds)	Michelle Lewis	Charles; Wilson	4:39
7.	"Promises"	Easther Bennett; Vernie Bennett	Charles; Wilson	4:07
8.	"I'm Still Cryin"	Nigel Lowis; Kéllé Bryan; Graham Plato	Lowis	4:50
9.	"All My Love" (featuring G-Man)	Lowis; Bryan; Plato	Lowis	3:06
10.	"What Do You Mean When You Say"	Vernie Bennett	Charles; Wilson	4:58
11.	"Why Am I Waiting"	E. Bennett; Mason; Robert Gerald; Denis Ingoldsby	Mason	4:16
12.	"It's Never Too Late" (Interlude)	E. Bennett	Charles; Wilson	1:14

Australian bonus track
No.	Title	Writer(s)	Producer(s)	Length
13.	"Dreams"	Stevie Nicks	Charles; Wilson	4:13

=== Japanese bonus tracks ===
- 1. "Finally" (On the Japanese edition this was placed as the first track)
- 14. "12 Months"
- 15. "I'll Take a Pass on Love"
- 16. "I Wanna Be the Only One" (This version features only Easther on lead vocals)

== Charts ==
=== Weekly charts ===
Weekly chart performance for Before the Rain
Chart (1997)	Peak position
Australian Albums (ARIA)	36
Austrian Albums (Ö3 Austria)	10
Danish Albums (Hitlisten)	4
European Albums (Top 100)	18
Dutch Albums (Album Top 100)	1
German Albums (Offizielle Top 100)	50
Japanese Albums (Oricon)	18
New Zealand Albums (RMNZ)	42
Norwegian Albums (VG-lista)	20
Scottish Albums (OCC)	14
Swedish Albums (Sverigetopplistan)	33
Swiss Albums (Schweizer Hitparade)	21
UK Albums (OCC)	3
UK R&B Albums (OCC)	1

=== Year-end charts ===
1997 year-end chart performance for Before the Rain
Chart (1997)	Position
Danish Albums (Hitlisten)	32
Dutch Albums (Album Top 100)	39
European Albums (Top 100)	92
UK Albums (OCC)	42

== Certifications ==
Certifications for Before the Rain
Region	Certification	Certified units/sales
Japan (RIAJ)	Gold	100,000^{^}
Netherlands (NVPI)	Gold	50,000^{^}
United Kingdom (BPI)	Platinum	300,000^{^}
^{^} Shipments figures based on certification alone.
