= Power of a Woman =

Studio album by Eternal
- Released: 30 October 1995
- Recorded: April–August 1995
- Studios: The Master Room, London; Sarm West Studios, London
- Genres: R&B; soul
- Length: 53:16
- Labels: EMI; 1st Avenue
- Producers: Dennis Charles; Ronnie Wilson; Rhett Lawrence; BeBe Winans; Debra Killings; Arnold Hennings; Dallas Austin

Eternal chronology
Always & Forever (1993)	Power of a Woman (1995)	Before the Rain (1997)

Singles from Power of a Woman
- 1. "Power of a Woman" Released: 9 October 1995; 2. "I Am Blessed" Released: 27 November 1995; 3. "Good Thing" Released: 26 February 1996; 4. "Who Are You?" Released: 13 March 1996 (Japan only); 5. "Secrets" Released: 25 November 1996

Alternative cover
- Re-release cover

Professional ratings
Review scores
Source	Rating
AllMusic	2/5 stars
NME	8/10
Smash Hits	4/5 stars

Power of a Woman is the second studio album by the British R&B vocal group Eternal, released in October 1995. It was the band's first album without former member Louise who left the group to pursue a solo career. According to Billboard, as of February 1997, Power of a Woman has sold two million copies worldwide. In June 2019, Power of a Woman was ranked at number 25 on the Official Charts Company's list of the "top 40 biggest girl band studio albums of the last 25 years".

== Overview ==
The album was a success and charted at number 6 in the UK Albums Chart in 1995. Eternal worked with new producers, giving them a slightly more R&B feel than their previous album Always & Forever. Power of a Woman received a positive reaction from critics, and the album was later re-released with a bonus disc featuring dance remixes.

Power of a Woman gave Eternal another 4 top 10 singles, the title track, "I Am Blessed", and remixed versions of "Good Thing" and "Secrets". "It Will Never End" was planned to be the fifth release, but this was later cancelled due to Eternal releasing "Someday", which was the theme tune to Disney's 1996 film The Hunchback of Notre Dame. "Who Are You?" was released as a single in Japan only. "Who Are You?" was used in a South East Asian Toyota advertisement, and reached no. 1 on the Japanese singles chart.

In 1996 the album was re-released as a two CD set. Disc one contains the original album and disc two is titled The Number One Dance Mixes and contains six remixes of previous Eternal singles.

The Australian version of Power of a Woman includes their debut single "Stay" as a bonus track at the end of the album.

== Studio personnel ==
Dennis Charles - Producer

Ronnie Wilson - Producer

Andy Bradfield - Mixer

== Track listing ==
=== Original album ===
No.	Title	Writer(s)	Length
1.	"Power of a Woman"	Carl Sturken; Evan Rogers	4:24
2.	"I Am Blessed"	Marsha Malamet; Mark Mueller	4:24
3.	"Good Thing"	David Frank; Jeff Pescetto	3:51
4.	"Telling You Now"	Eternal; Dennis Charles; Ronnie Wilson; D.A. Phillips	4:49
5.	"Hurry Up"	Eternal; Charles; Wilson	3:34
6.	"Redemption Song"	Bob Marley	4:12
7.	"It Will Never End"	BeBe Winans; Billy Steele	4:43
8.	"Who Are You"	Wilson	3:17
9.	"Secrets"	Debra Killings	3:42
10.	"Your Smile"	Eternal; D. Killings; James Killings	3:39
11.	"Don't Make Me Wait"	Eternal; Arnold Hennings	4:31
12.	"Up to You"	Eternal; Charles; Wilson	3:58
13.	"Faith in Love"	Eternal; Charles; Wilson	4:12

Japanese bonus track
No.	Title	Writer(s)	Length
14.	"Oh Happy Day"	Edwin Hawkins	3:41

=== Bonus disc: Number One Dance Mixes ===
No.	Title	Writer(s)	Length
1.	"Stay" (West End D'Rhythm Mix)	Mark Stevens; Bobby Khozouri	7:26
2.	"Just a Step from Heaven" (Frankie Foncett Main Mix)	Wayne Cohen; Sheppard Solomon	7:27
3.	"So Good" (Tree Men Full On Mix)	Eternal	6:49
4.	"Sweet Funky Thing" (Uno Clio Remix)	Tommy Faragher; Lotti Golden; Evelyn "Champagne" King	7:35
5.	"Crazy" (West End Remix)	Winans	6:11
6.	"Power of a Woman" (Father of Sound Vocal Mix)	Sturken; Rogers	8:19

== Charts ==
=== Weekly charts ===
Weekly chart performance for Power of a Woman
Chart (1995)	Peak position
Australian Albums (ARIA)	14
Dutch Albums (Album Top 100)	48
Japanese Albums (Oricon)	35
Scottish Albums (Official Charts)	15
UK Albums (Official Charts)	6
UK R&B Albums (Official Charts)	1

=== Year-end charts ===
1995 year-end chart performance for Power of a Woman
Chart (1995)	Position
UK Albums (OCC)	32

1996 year-end chart performance for Power of a Woman
Chart (1996)	Position
UK Albums (OCC)	67

== Certifications ==
Certifications and sales for Power of a Woman
Region	Certification	Certified units/sales
United Kingdom (BPI)	2× Platinum	600,000^{^}
Summaries
Worldwide	—	2,000,000
^{^} Shipments figures based on certification alone.
