= Rhett Lawrence =

American record producer and songwriter

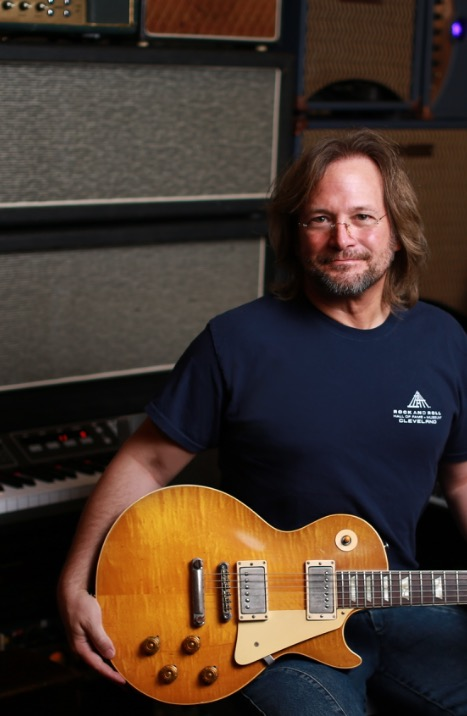
- Lawrence in 2016

Background information
- Genres: Pop; rock; gospel; R&B; funk; electronic
- Occupations: Record producer; songwriter; composer; arranger
- Instruments: Synthesizer; piano; guitar; bass guitar; drums; vocals
- Years active: 1982–present
- Labels: Rhettrhyme Music; BMG

James Everett "Rhett" Lawrence is an American record producer and songwriter. He first became known for producing the 1990 single "Vision of Love" by Mariah Carey, which won a Grammy Award and peaked atop the Billboard Hot 100. His productions have since resulted in sales of 350 million album-equivalent units worldwide.

Lawrence has produced and written songs for mainstream musical acts including Whitney Houston, Earth Wind and Fire, Little Richard, Philip Bailey, Gladys Knight, Jon Anderson (Yes), Anderson Bruford Wakeman Howe, Enrique Iglesias, Selena, Paula Abdul, Hilary Duff, Jessica Simpson, 98 Degrees, Carola Häggkvist, June Pointer, Kirk Franklin, and Crystal Lewis, among others.

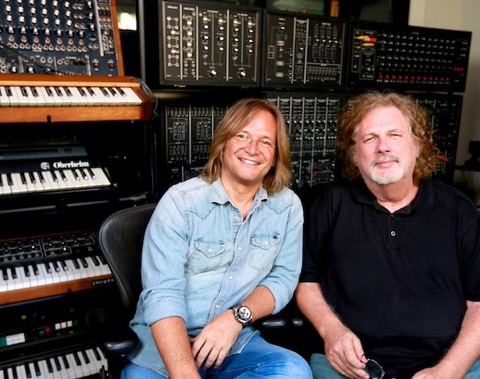
Rhett Lawrence with Dave Pensado, where they mixed recordings for Kelly Clarkson and Black Eyed Peas

Lawrence's other noteworthy production and songwriting credits include the 2000 single "Never Be the Same Again" by Melanie C, the 1998 single "Angel of Mine" by Monica (originally recorded by Eternal), and the 1997 single "I Wanna Be the Only One" for Eternal.

== Programmer, arranger and studio musician ==
Prior to becoming a producer, Lawrence was a programmer, arranger and studio musician in Los Angeles and New York. Some of the artists he worked with during this period include Michael Jackson on his Bad and Dangerous albums, Van Halen, Crosby Stills Nash and Young, Stevie Wonder, Gladys Knight, Anderson Bruford Wakeman Howe (a Yes spin-off), Earth Wind and Fire, Neil Diamond, Chicago ("Will You Still Love Me"), and Quincy Jones (two solo albums, Jackson, and Barbra Streisand), rock artists Billy Preston, Boz Scaggs and Roger Hodgson (formerly of Supertramp), pop artists Richard Marx, Belinda Carlisle ("Heaven is a Place On Earth"), easy listening artists Julio Iglesias, and David Foster, jazz artists Larry Carlton, George Benson and Earl Klugh, funk artists the Gap Band and the Dazz Band, and gospel artists Phil Keaggy and Andrae Crouch. He also programmed the distinctive drum loop (with Maurice Gibb and Scott Glasel) for the Bee Gees' "You Win Again (Bee Gees song)" that sold over three million copies worldwide, while working on multiple projects with them and Arif Mardin.

== Songwriting ==
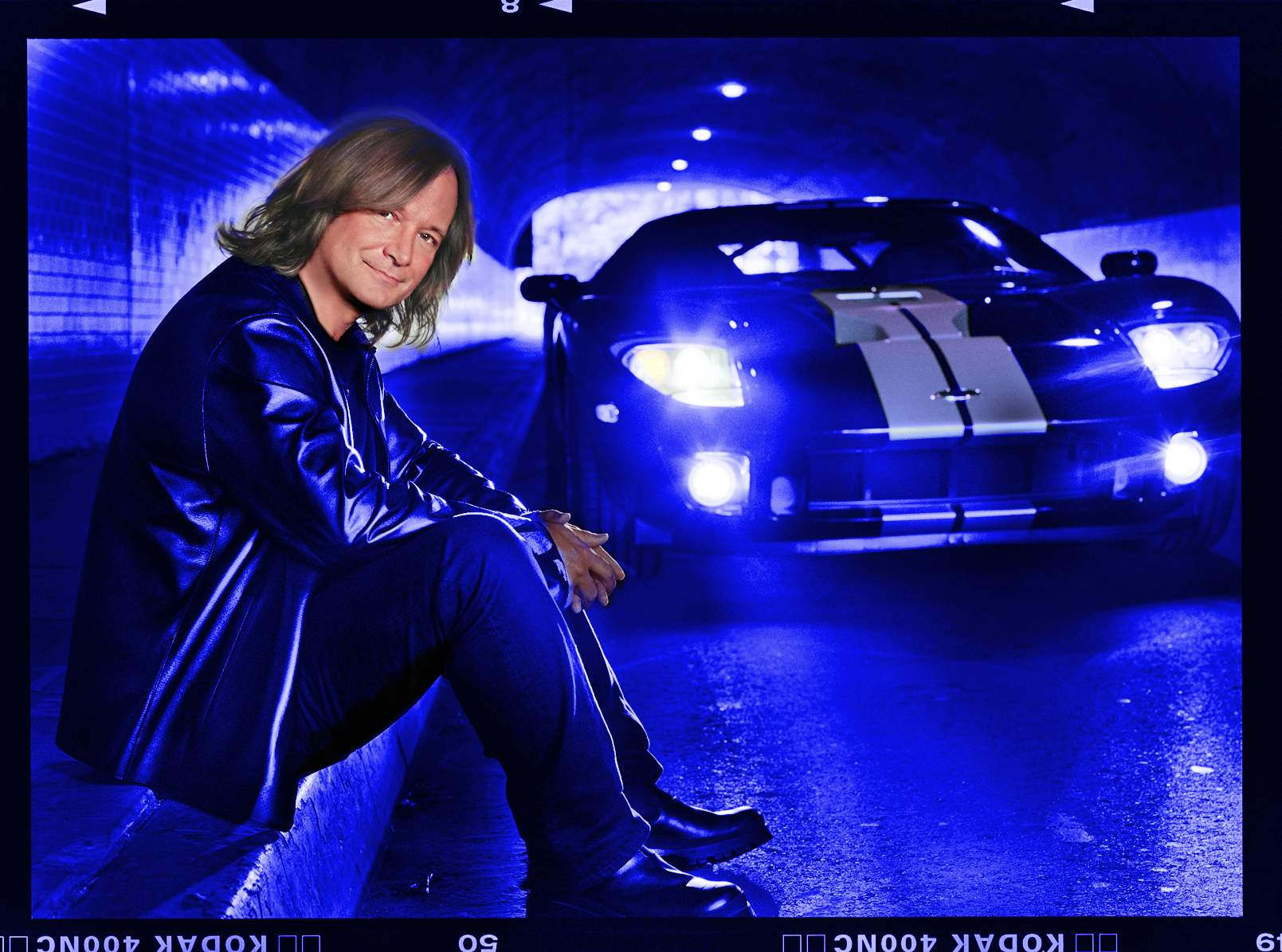
Rhett Lawrence with his Ford GT that inspired his song with Kelly Clarkson "Go"

Lawrence produced and co-wrote Kelly Clarkson's first single following her American Idol victory, "Miss Independent", which was at No. 1 for 6 weeks on Top 40 radio and received a Grammy Award nomination for Best Female Pop Vocal Performance. Lawrence's second collaboration with Clarkson led to the creation of a new anthem for Ford Motor Company titled "Go". The song was introduced first during American Idol and was inspired by Lawrence's love for Ford's anniversary re-issue of the GT40 Lemans race car, the Ford GT. "Go" became Ford's theme song for television and radio advertising in North and South America for one year, and led to Ford sponsoring Clarkson's tour for two years. Ford and Clarkson gave away a Ford Mustang or Ford Fusion to a lucky audience member at each concert.

Lawrence produced and co-wrote the Billboard No. 2 Rap single “Request + Line” for the Black Eyed Peas featuring Macy Gray, which gave them their first top 40 hit.

== Equipment and studio ==
In addition to the use of synthesizers, Lawrence used computers and sampling in albums, the first studio musician in Los Angeles to own and use the Fairlight CMI (Computer Music Instrument). He was an early advisor to Digidesign (later Avid Technology) and would later become the first producer to mix an album using Pro Tools, alongside legendary mixer Dave Pensado who continued collaboration through the years.

Lawrence also owns and records with a large collection of vintage guitars and recording equipment including Jimi Hendrix's first Marshall amplifier, which was given to Hendrix by Kit Lambert, manager of the Who during the 1960s, after its guitarist and original owner, Pete Townshend, had switched amplifier companies.
