= Secrets (Eternal song) =

1996 single by Eternal

Single by Eternal

from the album Power of a Woman
- Released: 25 November 1996
- Genre: R&B
- Length: 3:06
- Label: EMI; 1st Avenue
- Songwriter: Debra Killings
- Producer: Debra Killings

Eternal singles chronology
"Someday" (1996)	"Secrets" (1996)	"Don't You Love Me" (1997)

Alternative cover
- UK CD2

"Secrets" is a 1996 song by British R&B girl group Eternal. It was written by songwriter Debra Killings, and was the fifth and final single from their second album, Power of a Woman. The song peaked at number nine on the UK Singles Chart, becoming the group's ninth top-10 entry on the UK Singles Chart.

== Critical reception ==
A reviewer from Music Week rated the song three out of five, describing it as a "smooth, funky number [that] should follow the trio's last three singles into the Top 10."

== Track listings ==
#	UK CD1 - CDEMS459	Length
1.	"Secrets"	3:06
2.	"Black Cat" (Live) (Kelle solo)	4:36
3.	"Still in Love" (Live) (Vernie solo)	3:45

#	UK CD2 - CDEM459	Length
1.	"Secrets"	3:06
2.	"I Feel the Earth Move"	5:09
3.	"Redemption Song" (Chicco Secci Remix)	9:02
4.	"Who Are You" (Cutfather & Joe Mastermix)	3:35

Note: The two live tracks were recorded live at the Manchester Apollo by the Radio One Live Music Unit.

== Charts ==
Chart (1996)	Peak position
Europe (Eurochart Hot 100)	87
Scotland Singles (OCC)	12
UK Singles (OCC)	9
UK Airplay (Music Week)	11
UK Hip Hop/R&B (OCC)	4
