= Don't You Love Me (Eternal song) =

1997 single by Eternal

Single by Eternal

from the album Before the Rain
- Released: 24 February 1997
- Genre: Pop; R&B
- Length: 3:50
- Label: EMI; 1st Avenue
- Songwriters: Cynthia Biggs; Carolyn Mitchell; Terence Dudley; Christopher Kellum
- Producers: Ronnie Wilson; Dennis Charles

Eternal singles chronology
| "Secrets" (1996) | "Don't You Love Me" (1997) | "I Wanna Be the Only One" (1997) |

Alternative cover
- UK CD2

"Don't You Love Me" is a song by British R&B girl group Eternal. It was the second single to be released from their third studio album, Before the Rain (1997), released in February 1997 by EMI and 1st Avenue Records. The song was written by Cynthia Biggs, Carolyn Mitchell, Terence Dudley and Christopher Kellum, and produced by Ronnie Wilson and Dennis Charles. It deals with child neglect and abuse and features a choir of 20 children. "Don't You Love Me" was well-received by music critics and peaked at number three on the UK Singles Chart in March 1997, becoming the group's tenth top-10 entry on the chart, as well as their first top-three hit.

== Critical reception ==
A reviewer from Music Week gave "Don't You Love Me" a score of four out of five, writing, "Unusually opening like a second cousin of The Persuaders theme, this breaks into one of Eternal's strongest singles yet. Its powerful, rounder sound hints at a more mature musical direction for the forthcoming new album." Music Week editor Alan Jones described it as "a classy mid-tempo pop/R&B song hanging on a slightly changed but otherwise familiar bassline from the Dennis Edwards hit 'Don't Look Any Further'. Quite haunting and not even spoilt by a kid's chorus which appears as the record heads for the fade."

Gavin Reeve from Smash Hits also gave it four out of five, naming it "another powerful soul searcher". He added, "A poignant tale of homelessness, poverty and depression. Designed to pluck at your heart strings like an over zealous army of crabs, police sirens, children singing, an old fashioned harpsichord-type-thing(?) and the ever excellent vocals of the lay-dees combine to produce a haunting ditty that will get you blubbing with the sadness of it all." Ian Hyland from Sunday Mirror commented, "Before Spice Girls, Eternal were the most successful girl group in Britain - but they're not bitter. In fact, as this single shows, Eternal are better. A great taster for their next album, 'Don't You Love Me', this proves that when it comes to R'n'B the girls are up there with En Vogue. A definite hit, there's even a cheesy Charlie's Angels CD cover."

== Track listings ==
- UK CD1
1. "Don't You Love Me" (radio mix)
2. "I'll Take a Pass on Love"
3. "This Life's Not for Me"
- UK CD2 and Australian CD single
1. "Don't You Love Me" (radio mix)
2. "Don't You Love Me" (Blacksmith remix)
3. "Don't You Love Me" (Ronnie Size mix)
4. "Don't You Love Me" (Mark's Dream House vocal)
5. "Don't You Love Me" (Tony De Vit Trade mix)
- UK cassette single
1. "Don't You Love Me" (radio mix)
2. "This Life's Not for Me"
3. "Don't You Love Me" (Mark's Dream House vocal)
- European CD single
1. "Don't You Love Me" (radio mix)
2. "Don't You Love Me" (Mark's Dream House vocal)

== Charts ==
=== Weekly charts ===
| Chart (1997) | Peak position |
|---|---|
| Australia (ARIA) | 25 |
| Belgium (Ultratop 50 Flanders) | 44 |
| Europe (Eurochart Hot 100) | 32 |
| Iceland (Íslenski Listinn Topp 40) | 17 |
| Ireland (IRMA) | 23 |
| Israel (IBA) | 6 |
| Netherlands (Dutch Top 40) | 12 |
| Netherlands (Single Top 100) | 19 |
| New Zealand (Recorded Music NZ) | 31 |
| Scottish Singles Sales (Official Charts) | 7 |
| UK Singles (Official Charts) | 3 |
| UK Airplay (Music Week) | 1 |
| UK Hip Hop/R&B (Official Charts) | 1 |

=== Year-end charts ===
| Chart (1997) | Position |
|---|---|
| Romania (Romanian Top 100) | 17 |
| UK Singles (OCC) | 81 |
| UK Airplay (Music Week) | 42 |
