= Jeff Pescetto =

American musical artist (born 1954)

- Born: November 21, 1954 (age 71); Baltimore, Maryland, U.S.
- Occupation: Musician

Jeffrey Pescetto (born November 21, 1954) is an American musical artist who is most notable for collaborating with David Foster on the 1990 recreation of John Farnham's Australian single, "You're the Voice". Pescetto lent the vocals to Foster's pianism on the latter's River of Love album.

He has also written and sung songs for various movie soundtracks. His credits include Licence to Kill, Honey, I Shrunk the Kids, and Breakdown. He has also sung Tekken 5's opening song "Sparking" alongside Tom Leonard. He is also well known for being the singer of the theme songs to the 1980s Disney cartoon series Chip 'n Dale: Rescue Rangers and DuckTales, both composed by Mark Mueller (Rescue Rangers theme was also produced by Alf Clausen).

In 1990, he co-wrote the album track "Rescue Me" along with Charles Olins and Steve Dubin for American singer Alisha, included on the album Bounce Back.

== Albums ==
- Jeffrey – Ready or Not (1984)
- Soul Reason (2002)
- In My Shoes (2011)
- Little Fish (2016)

== Soundtrack filmography ==
- DuckTales (TV series, 1987–1990) (intro theme song lead singer)
- Chip 'n Dale Rescue Rangers (TV series, 1989–1990) (intro theme song lead singer)
- Darkwing Duck (TV series, 1991–1992) (intro theme song lead singer)
- Spaceballs (1987)
  - "Spaceballs" (writer)
- Licence to Kill (1989)
  - "Dirty Love" (writer)
- Honey, I Shrunk the Kids (1989)
  - "Turn It Up" (writer)
- Beakman's World (TV series, 1992–1997)
  - "Magnetism" song (music/lyrics), season 1 episode 9
- Princess Gwenevere and the Jewel Riders (TV Series, 1995–1996)
- Breakdown (1997)
  - "Nobody Knows" (lyrics/production)
  - "This Game of Love" (music/production)
  - "Walking Out the Back Door" (lyrics/production)
- Tekken 5 (2005)
  - "Sparking" (Singer)
