= I Am Blessed =

1995 single by Eternal

Single by Eternal

from the album Power of a Woman
- Released: 27 November 1995
- Genre: R&B; gospel
- Length: 4:21
- Label: EMI; 1st Avenue
- Songwriters: Mark Mueller; Marsha Malamet
- Producers: Ronnie Wilson; Dennis Charles

Eternal singles chronology
| "Power of a Woman" (1995) | "I Am Blessed" (1995) | "Good Thing" (1996) |

Alternative cover
- UK CD2

"I Am Blessed" is a song by British girl group Eternal written by hit songwriter Mark Mueller and Marsha Malamet. An R&B and gospel ballad, it was released as the second single from the group's second studio album, Power of a Woman (1995), and peaked at number seven on the UK Singles Chart. It was certified silver by the British Phonographic Industry (BPI) for shipments over 200,000 copies in the UK. It also reached number seven in Ireland, becoming the group's second top-10 hit in that country. Eternal performed "I Am Blessed" for Pope John Paul II at the Vatican in 1995.

== Critical reception ==
James Masterton for Dotmusic described the song as one of the group's "softer, slushier records". Pan-European magazine Music & Media wrote, "Another possible chart-buster from the creme of British R&B. The religious undertones are very suitable for the Christmas season, just like the extra track Oh Happy Day, a wonderfully updated version of the gospel traditional with a jazzy rhythm guitar and a midtempo beat." A reviewer from Music Week rated it three out of five, adding that "this silky smooth ballad has hints of I Will Always Love You, with Easther living up to Houston's standards. A hit, but not a monster."

== Track listings ==
UK CD1 and Australian CD single

1. "I Am Blessed"
2. "Oh Happy Day"
3. "Stay" (1995 D.A.R.C. R&B remix)
4. "Faith in Love"

UK CD2

1. "I Am Blessed" (Spiritual mix)
2. "Faith in Love"
3. "Power of a Woman" (Fathers of Sound vocal mix)

UK cassette single

1. "I Am Blessed"
2. "Faith in Love"

European CD single

1. "I Am Blessed"
2. "Oh Happy Day"
3. "Power of a Woman" (Nightcrawlers mix)
4. "Faith in Love"

== Credits and personnel ==
Credits are adapted from the Power of a Woman album booklet.

Studio

- Mastered at The Master Room (London, England)

Personnel

- Mark Mueller – writing
- Marsha Malamet – writing
- Clem Clempson – guitar
- Dave Phillips – keyboards
- Peter Oxendale – keyboards
- Nick Ingman – string arrangements
- Ronnie Wilson – production
- Dennis Charles – production
- Simon Climie – additional production and remix
- Nick Hopkins – recording engineer
- Andy Bradfield – mix engineering
- Ashley Alexander – assistant engineering
- Paul Meehan – programming
- Sam Noel – technician
- Arun Chakraverty – mastering

== Charts ==
=== Weekly charts ===
| Chart (1995–1996) | Peak position |
|---|---|
| Australia (ARIA) | 14 |
| Europe (Eurochart Hot 100) | 31 |
| Iceland (Íslenski Listinn Topp 40) | 40 |
| Ireland (IRMA) | 7 |
| Israel (IBA) | 29 |
| Netherlands (Dutch Top 40) | 29 |
| Netherlands (Single Top 100) | 26 |
| New Zealand (Recorded Music NZ) | 31 |
| Scotland Singles (OCC) | 6 |
| UK Singles (OCC) | 7 |
| UK Airplay (Music Week) | 8 |
| UK Hip Hop/R&B (OCC) | 2 |

=== Year-end charts ===
| Chart (1995) | Position |
|---|---|
| UK Singles (OCC) | 65 |

| Chart (1996) | Position |
|---|---|
| Australia (ARIA) | 83 |

== Certifications ==
| Region | Certification | Certified units/sales |
|---|---|---|
| United Kingdom (BPI) | Silver | 200,000^{^} |
^{^} Shipments figures based on certification alone.
