= Eternal (group) =

British girl group

- Origin: London, England
- Genres: R&B; soul
- Instrument: Vocals
- Works: Eternal discography
- Years active: 1992–2000, 2013–2014, 2024–present
- Labels: EMI; 1st Avenue
- Members: Easther Bennett; Vernie Bennett; Christel Lakhdar
- Past members: Louise Nurding; Kéllé Bryan

Eternal are a British R&B girl group formed in 1992, with the line-up originally consisting of sisters Easther and Vernie Bennett, with Kéllé Bryan and the latter's friend and classmate Louise Nurding (later and better known as Louise Redknapp), who were also recruited into the group by the label.

The group became an international success, selling around 10 million records worldwide. Nurding left the group before the release of their second album to focus on her solo career with the same label. Bryan left the group under undisclosed circumstances in 1998. The Bennett sisters were the only members left when the group disbanded in 2000.

Eternal made a brief comeback in 2013, with Bryan returning to the group, only for the group to disband once again in 2014. They were considered the UK's answer to the American girl group En Vogue.

Eternal's 1993 debut album Always & Forever peaked at number two on the UK Album Chart and went four-times platinum in the UK. In 1997, they reached number one on the UK Singles Chart with "I Wanna Be the Only One", which won them the 1997 Mobo Award for Best Single. They also received seven Brit Award nominations. In total they achieved 15 UK Top 20 hits between 1993 and 1999.

== Career ==
=== 1992–1995: Formation, Always & Forever and Louise's departure ===
Eternal were formed in 1992 by music manager Oliver Smallman of First Avenue Management, after which Eddie Gordon showed him how the success of En Vogue was built in the United Kingdom. Eternal were quickly signed to EMI Records and released their debut single, "Stay", in September 1993. The song was a success and it reached number four in the UK Singles Chart. Easther and Vernie Bennett were scouted in a nightclub in London and eventually found Louise Nurding. The trio began working together and recording until Nurding introduced her longtime friend Kéllé Bryan to the management and joined the group.

Eternal in 1993, (L–R): Louise Nurding, Vernie Bennett, Easther Bennett, and Kéllé Bryan

Eternal released their debut album, Always & Forever in November 1993, and it reached number two in the UK Albums Chart. The album sold over one million copies in the United Kingdom, and confirmed as four times platinum, making it one of 1994's biggest selling albums and the year's biggest-selling debut album. They were named Best Group at the Smash Hits Poll Winners Party and were nominated for four Brit Awards. Nurding decided to leave the group before the recording of Eternal's second album, and went on to pursue a successful solo career. In a 2014 interview, Vernie Bennett stated that the group were "gutted" when Nurding announced she was leaving and it was suggested that Bryan also leave to form a duo with Nurding, which Bryan stated she did not wish to do.

=== 1995–1998: Trio line-up: Power of a Woman, Before the Rain and Greatest Hits ===
Following Nurding's departure, the group decided not to replace her and carried on as a trio. Power of a Woman was the first album as a trio, and entered the UK chart at number six. It produced four hit singles, "Power of a Woman", "I Am Blessed" (which they performed for Pope John Paul II at the Vatican in 1995), a remixed version of "Good Thing" and a remixed version of "Secrets". All continued Eternal's tally of Top 10 UK hits.

In 1997, Eternal achieved their first ever UK number one, a duet with BeBe Winans, "I Wanna Be the Only One", which became the second most played song on UK Radio in 1997, and stayed at the top spot for one week. It was taken from their third album Before the Rain, which also included "Don't You Love Me". The album peaked at number three in the UK.

Eternal's Greatest Hits package was released in the latter part of 1997, peaking at number two on the UK Albums Chart and becoming the highest-selling hits package of the year. In 2013, Eternal's Greatest Hits was confirmed as being the biggest selling best-of album by a girl group in the UK. It featured their last top-10 single "Angel of Mine", which reached number four. "Angel of Mine" became an EP that featured four different mixes, including a remix by veteran party producer Frankie Cutlass and a cover of Fleetwood Mac's track "Dreams" featuring Grand Puba and Sadat X.

=== 1998–2000: Duo line-up: Bryan's departure, self-titled album, and split ===
In 1998, a week after their Party in the Park performance, Bryan was controversially dismissed by the Bennett sisters via fax from their solicitor. Their reasons cited "a breakdown in professional relations". A short time later, Bryan was diagnosed with lupus and was forced to abandon plans for a solo career. Easther & Vernie were thought to have recruited a new member, TJ Arlette, but this now seems firmly disputed by Vernie in this instagram comment asking 'who is this Tj'. The sisters carried on as a duo. "What'Cha Gonna Do" was released from their fourth album Eternal and hit number 16. With lack of promotion, the album charted at number 87. The next single "I Cry Real Tears" was expected to be released in April 2000, with a new version of the song; however, the single was scrapped due to poor sales of the album and Eternal were released from their recording deal with EMI. Internationally, the track "Free to Live" was released and translated to "Libre para vivir", which had moderate success in some European countries. The last televised performance by Eternal was on Songs of Praise in 2000 where the Bennett sisters performed the track "He Is".

=== 2013–2014: The Big Reunion ===
In 2006, it was announced that Eternal would be reforming for a live reunion tour alongside other acts including Boyz II Men. Although only Kéllé Bryan and Easther Bennett would be part of the project (Vernie Bennett was pregnant at the time and Nurding — now known as Louise Redknapp following her marriage to Jamie Redknapp — was busy with her solo career). In an interview around the time, Bryan claimed that the group had been offered numerous record deals over the past few years since the group had split up. Due to unforeseen circumstances, the tour was cancelled. In 2011, Vernie joined online social networking site Twitter. This news gave hope to many fans that eventually Eternal would be making a comeback at some point in the future.

Eternal officially confirmed in late 2013 that they would be reforming for the ITV2 documentary The Big Reunion, although Louise Redknapp would not be rejoining the group. Redknapp confirmed in an interview with The Times that Eternal was reforming without her. Following the announcement of the group's reformation, their 1997 Greatest Hits album climbed to number 1 on the iTunes hip-hop chart in January 2014. Following the group's episode airing, their Greatest Hits album entered at number 27 on the official iTunes chart. The group reformed to perform a concert at the Hammersmith Apollo in March 2014, where they performed alongside BeBe Winans for their hit single "I Wanna Be the Only One".

=== 2023–present: Second reunion; new lineup and touring ===
On 23 September 2023, the Daily Mirror reported that the group had planned to reunite for a tour in 2024. This would have been the first time that the group's original line-up had played together since Redknapp left the group to begin her solo career. However, Bryan and Redknapp pulled out of the reunion tour, reportedly due to the Bennett sisters' refusal to perform at LGBTQ Pride events and their negative posts about trans people on social media.

In March 2024, it was announced that singer Christel Lakhdar would be joining the Bennett sisters as the new member of Eternal and carrying on with the reunion plans.

On 6 July, the new lineup of Eternal made their official return at the SuperBoxx festival, marking the group's first performance in over a decade. On their official Instagram page, the group announced various upcoming gigs for 2025, with a one-off live concert taking place in Scala, London on 30 April.

== Solo careers ==
Louise Redknapp (née Nurding) was the first member of Eternal to leave to pursue a solo career, releasing several top 10 singles and albums and performing two UK tours from 1995 to 2003. She has also presented a number of television shows, including The Clothes Show, Something for the Weekend and So You Think You Can Dance.

Kéllé Bryan experienced minor success after leaving Eternal in the form of a number 14 single called "Higher Than Heaven" in October 1999, but her debut solo album, Breakfast in Bed, was never released. A second single, "I Wanna Know", was cancelled due to further health issues. She went on to launch her own artist management company, Red Hot Entertainment and finished as the female runner-up on the reality TV show Love Island. She also diversified into acting, appearing in the BBC sitcom series Me and Mrs Jones (2012) with Neil Morrissey, before joining the British soap opera Hollyoaks as series regular Martine Deveraux.

Easther Bennett teamed up with reggae band Aswad to record a cover of Diana King's "Shy Guy" for their album Cool Summer Reggae; "Shy Guy" was released as a single in August 2002 and peaked at number 62 on the UK Singles Chart. She also recorded a solo cover of the classic song "The First Time Ever I Saw Your Face", which appeared on many "love" themed compilations around 2002/3 including The All-Time Classic Tearjerkers. She also featured on the Peter Cox cover of the Marvin Gaye song "Your Precious Love". She then decided to turn to songwriting and has written for many different artists, including Girls Aloud. Easther also sang backing vocals on the Dina Carroll tracks "This Time" and "Don't Be a Stranger" (1993) along with her sister Vernie.

Vernie Bennett stepped out of the limelight following the split of Eternal. She went back to finish studying law and her Bar Vocational course. Vernie was called to the Bar in 2005 and, in 2006, gave birth to her first child. In August 2010, she signed with ASM Artist Management. She performed with sister Easther at James Ingham's Jog On for Cancer event for Cancer Research UK in 2015. She also appeared on ITV's All Star Mr & Mrs with her husband Bryan.

== Members ==
Member	1992	1993	1994	1995	1996	1997	1998	1999	2000	2013	2014	2024	2025	2026
Easther Bennett (1992–2000, 2013–2014, 2024-present)														
Vernie Bennett (1992–2000, 2013–2014, 2024-present)														
Kéllé Bryan (1992–1998, 2013–2014)														
Louise Nurding (1992–1995)														
Christel Lakhdar (2024–present)														

== Awards and nominations ==
Award	Year	Nominee(s)	Category	Result	Ref.
Brit Awards	1995	Themselves	British Group	Nominated	
Brit Awards	1995	Themselves	British Dance Act	Nominated	
Brit Awards	1995	Always & Forever	British Album of the Year	Nominated	
Brit Awards	1996	Themselves	British Dance Act	Nominated	
Brit Awards	1998	Themselves	British Dance Act	Nominated	
Brit Awards	1998	"I Wanna Be the Only One"	British Single of the Year	Nominated	

== Discography ==
=== Studio albums ===
- Always & Forever (1993)
- Power of a Woman (1995)
- Before the Rain (1997)
- Eternal (1999)

=== Compilation albums ===
- Greatest Hits (1997)
