= Crazy (Eternal song) =

1994 single by Eternal

Single by Eternal

from the album Always & Forever
- B-side: "(Something Inside) So Strong"; "Amazing Grace"; "His Eye Is on the Sparrow"
- Released: 12 December 1994
- Studio: Nashville, Tennessee; Los Angeles
- Genre: Gospel
- Length: 3:58
- Label: EMI; 1st Avenue
- Songwriter: BeBe Winans
- Producer: BeBe Winans

Eternal singles chronology
"Oh Baby I..." (1994)	"Crazy" (1994)	"Power of a Woman" (1995)

Alternative Cover
- UK CD2

"Crazy" is a song by British R&B girl group Eternal. Written and produced by BeBe Winans, the song was released in December 1994 as the sixth and final single to be released from their debut album, Always & Forever (1993). It entered and peaked at number 15 on the UK Singles Chart, staying on the charts for seven weeks. This would be the last single to feature member Louise Nurding, who left the group to pursue a solo career. Due to other commitments, Eternal were unable to record a promotional video for the song.

== Critical reception ==
British magazine Music Week gave the song a full score of five out of five, stating that "the girl's gospel roots are to the fore on this bumper Christmas package which once aga[i]n puts them in Whitney Houston, as opposed to En Vogue, territory." Ralph Tee from the Record Mirror Dance Update named it one of the highlights from the album. Another RM editor, James Hamilton, described it as a "strongly wailed Whitney-ish gospel remake" in his weekly dance column.

== Track listings ==
- UK CD1 and cassette single
1. "Crazy"
2. "(Something Inside) So Strong"
3. "Amazing Grace"
4. "His Eye Is on the Sparrow"
- UK CD2
1. "Crazy" (West End remix)
2. "Crazy" (The Association remix)
3. "Crazy" (Johnny Douglas remix)
4. "Crazy" (T&K remix)

== Credits and personnel ==
Credits are lifted from the Always & Forever album booklet.

Studios

- Recorded in Nashville, Tennessee and Los Angeles
- Mixed at RG Jones Recording Studios (London, England)

Personnel

- BeBe Winans – writing, production
- Tim Simenon – mixing

== Charts ==
=== Weekly charts ===
Chart (1994)	Peak position
Europe (Eurochart Hot 100)	45
Ireland (IRMA)	23
Israel (Israeli Singles Chart)	5
New Zealand (Recorded Music NZ)	25
Scottish Singles Sales (Official Charts)	17
UK Singles (Official Charts)	15
UK Airplay (Music Week)	8
UK Hip Hop/R&B (Official Charts)	2
UK Club Chart (Music Week)	2
UK Pop Tip Club Chart (Music Week)	11

=== Year-end charts ===
Chart (1994)	Position
UK Singles (OCC)	181
UK Club Chart (Music Week)	44
