= Power of a Woman (song) =

1995 single by Eternal

Single by Eternal

from the album Power of a Woman
- B-side: "Hurry Up"
- Released: 9 October 1995
- Genre: R&B; swingbeat
- Length: 3:56
- Label: EMI United Kingdom; 1st Avenue
- Songwriters: Carl Sturken; Evan Rogers
- Producers: Ronnie Wilson; Dennis Charles

Eternal singles chronology
| "Crazy" (1994) | "Power of a Woman" (1995) | "I Am Blessed" (1995) |

"Power of a Woman" is a song by British R&B girl group Eternal. It was written by the songwriting duo of Carl Sturken and Evan Rogers, and was released in October 1995 by EMI United Kingdom and 1st Avenue Records as the first single from the group's second studio album, Power of a Woman (1995). It was also their first release as a trio after the departure of Louise Redknapp. "Power of a Woman" peaked at number five on the UK Singles Chart and became the group's fifth top-10 single. In Australia, the song became the group's second top-10 single, reaching number eight in April 1996. Its music video was directed by Randee St. Nicholas.

== Critical reception ==
James Masterton for Dotmusic felt "Power of a Woman" "is less of an immediate pop hit that some of its predecessors, instead being a rather dark yet no less brilliant R&B track. That alone is enough to make it the biggest new hit of the week". Pan-European magazine Music & Media noted that the British trio "manages to sound both forceful and feminine at the same time. Their seductive voices blend in well with the contemporary R&B-influenced production." A reviewer from Music Week gave it a full score of five out of five and named it Single of the Week, complimenting it as "a sinuous, piano-propelled R&B number, with US appeal stamped all over it."

David Quantick from NME found that the song is based "rather heavily" on The Emotions' "Best of My Love". James Hamilton from the Record Mirror Dance Update described it as a "powerfully wailed and cooed excellent US-style jillswinger". Also Gavin Reeve from Smash Hits gave "Power of a Woman" five out of five, writing that "this is absolutely brilliant. A really confident, upbeat pop song with the usual supply of top-notch harmonies, a chorus that sticks in your head like superglue and all those kung fu-type noises they have a habit of putting in the background. Easther, Vernie and Kelle have never sounded better".

== Track listings ==
- UK and Australasian CD single
1. "Power of a Woman"
2. "Hurry Up"
3. "Power of a Woman" (Fathers of Sound dub mix)
4. "Power of a Woman" (Bottom Dollar dub mix)
- UK cassette single and European CD single
1. "Power of a Woman"
2. "Hurry Up"
- UK 12-inch single

A1. "Power of a Woman" (Fathers of Sound vocal mix)
A2. "Power of a Woman" (Bottom Dollar vocal mix)
B1. "Power of a Woman" (Boot & Mac mix)
B2. "Power of a Woman" (D.A.R.C. R&B mix)

- Japanese mini-CD single
1. "Power of a Woman (パワー・オブ・ア・ウーマン)"
2. "Who Are You (フー・アー・ユー)"

== Credits and personnel ==
Credits are adapted from the Power of a Woman album booklet.

Studio

- Mastered at The Master Room (London, England)

Personnel

- Carl Sturken – writing
- Evan Rogers – writing
- Milton McDonald – guitar
- Dave Phillips – keyboards
- Ronnie Wilson – production
- Dennis Charles – production
- Nick Hopkins – recording engineer
- Andy Bradfield – mix engineering
- Ashley Alexander – assistant engineering
- Paul Meehan – programming
- Sam Noel – technician
- Arun Chakraverty – mastering

== Charts ==
=== Weekly charts ===
| Chart (1995–1996) | Peak position |
|---|---|
| Australia (ARIA) | 8 |
| Europe (Eurochart Hot 100) | 18 |
| Europe (European Hit Radio) | 15 |
| Iceland (Íslenski Listinn Topp 40) | 33 |
| Ireland (IRMA) | 19 |
| Israel (IBA) | 9 |
| Netherlands (Dutch Top 40) | 35 |
| Netherlands (Single Top 100) | 37 |
| New Zealand (Recorded Music NZ) | 33 |
| Scotland Singles (OCC) | 14 |
| UK Singles (OCC) | 5 |
| UK Airplay (Music Week) | 2 |
| UK Hip Hop/R&B (OCC) | 1 |
| UK Club Chart (Music Week) | 1 |

=== Year-end charts ===
| Chart (1995) | Position |
|---|---|
| UK Singles (OCC) | 85 |
| UK Airplay (Music Week) | 35 |

| Chart (1996) | Position |
|---|---|
| Australia (ARIA) | 53 |

== Certifications ==
| Region | Certification | Certified units/sales |
|---|---|---|
| Australia (ARIA) | Gold | 35,000^{^} |
^{^} Shipments figures based on certification alone.

== Release history ==
| Region | Date | Format(s) | Label(s) | Ref. |
|---|---|---|---|---|
| United Kingdom | 9 October 1995 | CD; cassette | EMI United Kingdom; 1st Avenue | |
| Japan | 8 November 1995 | Mini-CD | EMI | |
| Australia | 20 November 1995 | CD; cassette | EMI United Kingdom; 1st Avenue | |
