= List of UK Dance Singles Chart number ones of 1995 =

These are The Official UK Charts Company UK Dance Chart number one hits of 1995. The dates listed in the menus below represent the Saturday after the Sunday the chart was announced, as per the way the dates are given in chart publications such as the ones produced by Billboard, Guinness, and Virgin.

Issue date	Song	Artist
7 January	"U Sure Do"	Strike
14 January	"I'm Going All the Way"	Sounds of Blackness
21 January	"Saved"	Mr. Roy
28 January	"Good Life"	E.V.E
4 February	"Reach Up (Pigbag)"	Perfecto Allstarz
11 February	"Train of Thought"	Escrima
18 February	"Passion"	Jon of the Pleased Wimmin
25 February	"Feel It"	Carol Bailey
4 March	"Push the Feeling On"	The Nightcrawlers
11 March	"Yeke Yeke"	Mory Kante
18 March	"Embracing the Sunshine"	BT
25 March	"Always (Something There to Remind Me)"	Tin Tin Out featuring Espiritu
1 April	"U Sure Do"	Strike
8 April	"Not Over Yet"	Grace
15 April	"Not Over Yet"	Grace
22 April	"Legends of the Dark Black - P2"	Wildchild
29 April	"Legends of the Dark Black - P2"	Wildchild
6 May	"Lifting Me Higher"	Gems for Jem
13 May	"Dreamer"	Livin' Joy
20 May	"Dreamer"	Livin' Joy
27 May	"Surrender Your Love"	The Nightcrawlers featuring John Reid
3 June	"I Believe"	Happy Clappers
10 June	"Sex on the Streets"	Pizzaman
17 June	"Leave Home"	The Chemical Brothers
24 June	"Right and Exact"	Chrissy Ward
1 July	"Sweet Harmony"	Liquid
8 July	"Keep Warm"	Jinny
15 July	"Keep Warm"	Jinny
22 July	"Stay (Tonight)"	Isha D
29 July	"Only Me"	Hyperlogic
5 August	No Chart Published	No Chart Published
12 August	"When I Call Your Name"	Mary Kiani
19 August	"Freedom"	Shiva
26 August	"Move Your Body"	Xpansions
2 September	"Hideaway"	De'Lacy
9 September	"I Feel Love"	Donna Summer
16 September	"U Girls (Look so Sexy)"	Nush
23 September	"Cry India "	Umboza
30 September	"Fee Fi Fo Fum"	Candy Girls
7 October	"Deeper"	Escrima
14 October	"Weekend"	Todd Terry Project
21 October	"Higher State of Consciousness"	Josh Wink
28 October	"Missing"	Everything but the Girl
4 November	"Missing"	Everything but the Girl
11 November	"I'm Ready"	Size 9
18 November	"I Believe"	Happy Clappers
25 November	"To the Beat of the Drum (La Luna)"	The Ethics
2 December	"Technocat"	Technocat featuring Tom Wilson
9 December	"Insomnia"	Faithless
16 December	"Something About U (Can't be Beat)"	Mr. Roy
23 December	"Children"	Robert Miles
30 December	"Children"	Robert Miles

== See also ==
- 1995 in music
