= Record Mirror Club Chart =

European music chart

The Record Mirror Club Chart (also known as RM Club Chart) was a weekly chart compiled by British trade paper Music Week. It was published in their RM Dance Update, a supplemental insert, and was compiled from a sample of over 500 DJ returns. The chart was also featured on the Mark Goodier show on Radio 1 FM every Mondays at 7.30pm.

== Number-one singles on the Record Mirror Club Chart ==
=== 1993 ===
Issue date	Club Chart		Ref.
Issue date	Title	Artist(s)	Ref.
2 January	"It's Gonna Be a Lovely Day"	The S.O.U.L. S.Y.S.T.E.M.	
9 January	"The Love I Lost"	West End featuring Sybil	
13 February	"Feel Like Singin'"	Sandy B	
20 February	"I'm Every Woman"	Whitney Houston	
6 March	"Give It to You"	Martha Wash	
13 March	"Pressure"	Sunscreem	
20 March	"Looks Like I'm In Love Again"	Keywest featuring Erik	
3 April	"Sweet Freedom"	Positive Gang	
10 April	"Ain't No Love (Ain't No Use)"	Sub Sub featuring Melanie Williams	
17 April	"Believe in Me"	Utah Saints	
24 April	"U R the Best Thing"	D:Ream	
1 May	"Happiness"	Serious Rope featuring Sharon Dee Clarke	
15 May	"Good Life"	Inner City	
22 May	"Rockin' to the Rhythm"	Convert	
29 May	"The Power"	Monie Love	
5 June	"Thinking of You"	Sister Sledge	
12 June	"Dreams"	Gabrielle	
19 June	"Gimme Luv"	David Morales & The Bad Yard Club	
3 July	"Can't Get Enough of Your Love"	Taylor Dayne	
10 July	"Caught in the Middle"	Juliet Roberts	
7 August	"Slave to the Vibe"	Aftershock	
21 August	"Trippin' on Your Love"	Kenny Thomas	
28 August	"Fantasy"	Ten City	
4 September	"What Happened to the Music"	Joey Negro	
18 September	"Moving On Up"	M People	
25 September	"Stay"	Eternal	
2 October	"Gotta Get It Right"	Lena Fiagbe	
16 October	"Free Love"	Juliet Roberts	
30 October	"So in Love (The Real Deal)"	Judy Cheeks	
6 November	"Power"	Nu Colours	
20 November	"Let Me Show You"	K-Klass	
27 November	"Lemon"	U2	
4 December	"Here"	Dina Carroll	
18 December	"Save Our Love"	Eternal	

=== 1994 ===
Issue date	Club Chart		Ref.
Issue date	Title	Artist(s)	Ref.
15 January	"The Music's Got Me!"	Bass Bumpers	
22 January	"Why"	D Mob featuring Cathy Dennis	
29 January	"A Deeper Love"	Aretha Franklin	
12 February	"Beautiful People"	Barbara Tucker	
19 February	"I Want You"	Juliet Roberts	
26 February	"Because of Love"	Janet Jackson	
12 March	"Let the Music (Lift You Up)"	Loveland	
9 April	"Reach"	Judy Cheeks	
30 April	"When a Man Loves a Woman"	Jody Watley	
7 May	"Crazy Man"/"Take You Right"	X-Clusive/Italian U.M.M.	
21 May	"Feel What You Want"	Kristine W	
4 June	"Caught in the Middle"	Juliet Roberts	
18 June	"Throb"	Janet Jackson	
25 June	"And I Am Telling You I'm Not Going"	Donna Giles	
2 July	"Satisfy My Love"	Sabrina Johnston	
9 July	"Nite Life"	Kim English	
16 July	"One Day"	D Mob	
23 July	"True Spirit"	Carleen Anderson	
6 August	"Kickin' In the Beat"	Pamela Fernandez	
13 August	"Congo"	The Boss	
20 August	"Break 4 Love"	Raze	
27 August	"The Colour of Love"	The Reese Project	
3 September	"All Over Me"	Suzi Carr	
17 September	"I Want You"	Juliet Roberts	
24 September	"Back It Up"	Robin S.	
1 October	"CantGetaMan CantGetaJob (Life's a Bitch)"	Sister Bliss with Colette	
22 October	"The More I Get, The More I Want"	KWS featuring Teddy Pendergrass	
29 October	"Sweet Funky Thing"	Eternal	
5 November	"Melody of Love (Wanna Be Loved)"	Donna Summer	
19 November	"Don't Bring Me Down"	Spirits	
26 November	"Be Happy"	Mary J. Blige	
17 December	"Good Life"	E.V.E.	
24 December	"Won't Waste You"/"My Heart Belongs to You"/"Cry for You"/"You Got It"	Jodeci	

=== 1995 ===
Issue date	Club Chart		Ref.
Issue date	Title	Artist(s)	Ref.
14 January	"Don't Give Me Your Life"	Alex Party	
25 March	"Not Over Yet"	Grace	
6 May	"Dreamer"	Livin' Joy	
13 May	"Sex on the Streets"	Pizzaman	
17 June	"3 Is Family"	Dana Dawson	
26 August	"I Feel Love"	Donna Summer	
21 October	"Power of a Woman"	Eternal	
2 December	"The Best Things in Life Are Free"	Luther Vandross & Janet Jackson	
23 December	"Reach"	Judy Cheeks	

=== 1996 ===
Issue date	Club Chart		Ref.
Issue date	Title	Artist(s)	Ref.
24 February	"Disco's Revenge"	Gusto	
23 March	"Keep On Jumpin'"	The Lisa Marie Experience	
20 April	"Always There"	Incognito & Jocelyn Brown	
11 May	"Heaven"	Sarah Washington	
15 June	"Where Love Lives"	Alison Limerick	
22 June	"Keep On Jumpin'"	Todd Terry presents Martha Wash & Jocelyn Brown	
6 July	"Higher State of Consciousness"	Josh Wink	
24 August	"Let's All Chant"	Gusto	
30 November	"Move Any Mountain"	The Shamen	
30 November	"Ultra Flava"	Heller and Farley Project	

=== 1997 ===
Issue date	Club Chart		Pop Club Chart		Urban Club Chart		Ref.
Issue date	Title	Artist(s)	Title	Artist(s)	Title	Artist(s)	Ref.
4 January	"Get Up (Everybody)"	Byron Stingily	"2 Become 1" / "Wannabe"	Spice Girls	Chart not created		
11 January	"Get Up (Everybody)"	Byron Stingily	"Do You Know"	Michelle Gayle	Chart not created		
18 January	"You Got the Love"	The Source	"Do You Know"	Michelle Gayle	Chart not created		
25 January	"You Got the Love"	The Source	"Do You Know"	Michelle Gayle	Chart not created		
1 February	"Just Playin'"	JT Playaz	"Do You Know"	Michelle Gayle	Chart not created		
8 February	"Just Playin'"	JT Playaz	"Do You Know"	Michelle Gayle	Chart not created		
15 February	"Come on Y'all" / "Let Me Tell You Something"	Rhythm Masters	"Do You Know"	Michelle Gayle	Chart not created		
22 February	"Alright"	Jamiroquai	"Party People (Live Your Life Be Free)"	Pianoman	"I'm Not Feeling You"	Yvette Michele	
1 March	"Alright"	Jamiroquai	"Party People (Live Your Life Be Free)"	Pianoman	"I'm Not Feeling You"	Yvette Michele	
8 March	"Flash" / "Seven Days and One Week"	B.B.E.	"Don't You Love Me"	Eternal	"I'm Not Feeling You"	Yvette Michele	
15 March	"My Love Is Deep"	Sara Parker	"Don't You Love Me"	Eternal	"Can't Nobody Hold Me Down"	Puff Daddy ft. Mase	
22 March	"My Love Is Deep"	Sara Parker	"Who Do You Think You Are" / "Mama"	Spice Girls	"Can't Nobody Hold Me Down"	Puff Daddy ft. Mase	
29 March	"Reverence"	Faithless	"Don't Speak"	Deja Vu ft. Tasmin	"Hypnotize"	The Notorious B.I.G	
5 April	"Sensational"	Michelle Gayle	"Who Do You Think You Are" / "Mama"	Spice Girls	"Hypnotize"	The Notorious B.I.G	
12 April	"Sensational"	Michelle Gayle	"Sensational"	Michelle Gayle	"Request Line"	Zhané	
19 April	"Shine"	The Space Brothers	"Sensational"	Michelle Gayle	"Request Line"	Zhané	
26 April	"You're Not Alone"	Olive	"Blood on the Dance Floor"	Michael Jackson	"Request Line"	Zhané	
3 May	"You're Not Alone"	Olive	"Blood on the Dance Floor"	Michael Jackson	"Request Line"	Zhané	
10 May	"Feel What You Want"	Kristine W	"Blood on the Dance Floor"	Michael Jackson	In My Bed"	Dru Hill	
17 May	"Feel What You Want"	Kristine W	I Wanna Be the Only One"	Eternal ft. BeBe Winans	Love Is All We Need"	Mary J. Blige	
24 May	I Wanna Be the Only One"	Eternal ft. BeBe Winans	I Wanna Be the Only One"	Eternal ft. BeBe Winans	Love Is All We Need"	Mary J. Blige	
31 May	"Free"	Ultra Naté	"Ecuador"	Sash! ft. Rodriguez	"Spirit"	Sounds of Blackness ft. Craig Mack	
7 June	"Free"	Ultra Naté	"Ecuador"	Sash! ft. Rodriguez	"Spirit"	Sounds of Blackness ft. Craig Mack	
14 June	"Free"	Ultra Naté	"Ecuador"	Sash! ft. Rodriguez	"Head over Heels"	Allure featuring Nas	
21 June	"Something Goin' On (In Your Soul)"	Todd Terry ft. Martha Wash and Jocelyn Brown	"Ecuador"	Sash! ft. Rodriguez	"Mo Money Mo Problems"	The Notorious B.I.G. ft. Puff Daddy and Mase	
28 June	"Something Goin' On (In Your Soul)"	Todd Terry ft. Martha Wash and Jocelyn Brown	"Ecuador"	Sash! ft. Rodriguez	"Mo Money Mo Problems"	The Notorious B.I.G. ft. Puff Daddy and Mase	
5 July	"Something Goin' On (In Your Soul)"	Todd Terry ft. Martha Wash and Jocelyn Brown	"Ecuador"	Sash! ft. Rodriguez	"Mo Money Mo Problems"	The Notorious B.I.G. ft. Puff Daddy and Mase	
12 July	"Moment of My Life"	Bobby D'Ambrosio	"HIStory" / "Ghosts"	Michael Jackson	"Mo Money Mo Problems"	The Notorious B.I.G. ft. Puff Daddy and Mase	
19 July	"Panther Party"	Mad Moses	"HIStory" / "Ghosts"	Michael Jackson	"Mo Money Mo Problems"	The Notorious B.I.G. ft. Puff Daddy and Mase	
26 July	"Clouds"	The Source ft. Taka Boom	"HIStory" / "Ghosts"	Michael Jackson	"Not Tonight"	Lil' Kim	
2 August	"Why Don't You Dance With Me"	Future Breeze	"Don't Go Away" / "U Sexy Thing" / "Everybody Jump Around"	Clock	"Someone"	SWV ft. Puff Daddy	
9 August	"Plastic Dreams"	Jaydee	"Gimme Some Love"	Gina G	"Someone"	SWV ft. Puff Daddy	
16 August	"Plastic Dreams"	Jaydee	"Gimme Some Love"	Gina G	"Someone"	SWV ft. Puff Daddy	
23 August	"Plastic Dreams"	Jaydee	"Gimme Some Love"	Gina G	"Someone"	SWV ft. Puff Daddy	
30 August	"Plastic Dreams"	Jaydee	"Offshore '97" / "Red Skies"	Chicane with Power Circle	"Someone"	SWV ft. Puff Daddy	
6 September	"Carry On '97"	Martha Wash	"Barbie Girl"	Aqua	"Honey"	Mariah Carey	
13 September	"Carry On '97"	Martha Wash	"The Strangest Thing '97"	George Michael	"Honey"	Mariah Carey	
20 September	"Saturday"	East 57th St.	"The Strangest Thing '97"	George Michael	"Fix"	Blackstreet ft. Ol' Dirty Bastard and Slash	
27 September	"Saturday"	East 57th St.	"Stay"	"Sash!" ft. La Trec	"Fix"	Blackstreet ft. Ol' Dirty Bastard and Slash	
4 October	"Don't Give Up"	Michelle Weeks	"Stay"	"Sash!" ft. La Trec	"Big Bad Mamma" / "Never Seen Before"	Foxy Brown ft. Dru Hill and EPMD	
11 October	"Don't Give Up"	Michelle Weeks	"Da Ya Think I'm Sexy"	N-Trance ft. Rod Stewart	"Angel of Mine"	Eternal	
18 October	"Don't Give Up"	Michelle Weeks	"Stay"	"Sash!" ft. La Trec	"Got 'til It's Gone"	Janet ft. Q-Tip and Joni Mitchell	
25 October	"I Believe"	"Happy Clappers	"Stay"	"Sash!" ft. La Trec	"You Make Me Wanna..."	Usher	
1 November	"Benedictus" / "Nightmare"	"Brainbug	"Open Your Mind '97"	U.S.U.R.A.	"You Make Me Wanna..."	Usher	
8 November	"Forgiven (I Feel Your Love)"	The Space Brothers	"Open Your Mind '97"	U.S.U.R.A.	"Call Me"	Blackstreet ft. Jay-Z	
15 November	"It's Over Love"	Todd Terry ft. Shannon	"Let's Go Round Again"	Louise	"Call Me"	Blackstreet ft. Jay-Z	
22 November	"It's Over Love"	Todd Terry ft. Shannon	"Everything She Wants '97"	Wham!	"Read My Mind"	Conner Reeves	
29 November	"Belo Horizonti"	The Heartists	"Everything She Wants '97"	Wham!	"Missing You" / "Everything" / "I Can Love You"	Mary J. Blige	
6 December	"High Times"	Jamiroquai	"Everything She Wants '97"	Wham!	"Missing You" / "Everything" / "I Can Love You"	Mary J. Blige	
13 December	"So Good" / "Free Love '98"	Juliet Roberts	"Everything She Wants '97"	Wham!	"If You Think I'm Jiggy"	The Lox	
20 December	"So Good" / "Free Love '98"	Juliet Roberts	"Doctor Jones"	Aqua	"Dangerous"	Busta Rhymes	
27 December	"Renegade Master"	Wildchild	"I Feel Divine"	S-J	"You Make Me Wanna..."	Usher	

== UK on a Pop Tip Club Chart ==
The UK on a Pop Tip Club Chart was a chart published by Music Week from January 1995, in their RM Dance Update. It was compiled by a sample of over 500 (later 600) DJ returns and established as a chart focusing on the big mainstream pop/dance hits being played in the UK clubs at the time. After a trial run for three months, the chart became successful and continued for several years. The first number-one hit on the UK on a Pop Tip Club Chart was "I Need Somebody" by Loveland featuring Rachel McFarlane, on 14 January 1995.

=== Number-one singles on the Record Mirror Pop Tip Club Chart ===
==== 1995 ====
Issue date	Pop Tip Club Chart	
Issue date	Title	Artist(s)
14 January	"I Need Somebody"	Loveland featuring Rachel McFarlane
21 January	"Don't Give Me Your Life"	Alex Party
11 February	"Run Away"	Real McCoy
18 February	"Reach Up (Papa's Got a Brand New Pig Bag)"	Perfecto All Starz
4 March	"Don't Give Me Your Life"	Alex Party
18 March	"Baby Baby"	Corona
1 April	"Sweet Dreams"	DJ Scott featuring Lorna B
15 April	"U Sure Do"	Strike
13 May	"Dreamer"	Livin' Joy
10 June	"Zombie"	A.D.A.M. featuring Amy
15 July	"Common People"	Pulp
12 August	"I Feel Love"	Donna Summer
26 August	"La La La Hey Hey"	The Outhere Brothers
16 September	"Break the Chain"	Motiv 8
23 September	"Stayin' Alive"	N-Trance
30 September	"Union City Blue"	Blondie
7 October	"It's On You (Scan Me)"	Eurogroove
21 October	"Walking in Memphis"	Cher
11 November	"Shine Like a Star"	Berri
18 November	"What's That Tune? (Doo Doo Doo Doo Doo Doo...)"	Dorothy
9 December	"I Don't Wanna Be a Star"	Corona

==== 1996 ====
Issue date	Pop Tip Club Chart	
Issue date	Title	Artist(s)
6 January	"I Don't Wanna Be a Star"	Corona
20 January	"So Pure"	Baby D
27 January	"Spaceman"	Babylon Zoo
3 February	"Holdin' On 4 U"	Clock
24 February	"Jellyhead"	Crush
9 March	"State of Independence"	Donna Summer
16 March	"Ooh Aah... Just a Little Bit"	Gina G
13 April	"It's Raining Men"	West End
27 April	"Wonderwall"/"Live Forever"	Jackie 'O'
4 May	"Fastlove"/"I'm Your Man" ('96 Mix)	George Michael
11 May	"Love Resurrection"	D'Lux
1 June	"U Sure Do"/"Inspiration"	Strike
29 June	"Surprise"	Bizarre Inc
6 July	"Sunshine"	Umboza
20 July	"Higher State of Consciousness"	Wink
3 August	"Macarena"	Los Del Rio
17 August	"Oh What a Night (December '63)"/"You Give Me Love"	Clock
31 August	"Are You Ready For Some More?"	Reel 2 Real
14 September	"Shame"	Kim Wilde
28 September	"It's All Coming Back to Me Now"	Celine Dion
12 October	"Stranger in Moscow"	Michael Jackson
16 November	"I Belong to You"	Gina G
23 November	"Naked"/"One Kiss from Heaven"	Louise
30 November	"I Want Candy"	Candy Girls
14 December	"2 Become 1"/"Wannabe"	Spice Girls

== See also ==
- Music Week on World Radio History
- Record Mirror on World Radio History
