= Happiness (Pizzaman song) =

1995 single by Pizzaman

Single by Pizzaman

from the album Pizzamania
- Released: 6 November 1995
- Genre: Disco; house
- Length: 3:28
- Label: Loaded
- Songwriter: Pizzaman
- Producer: Pizzaman

Pizzaman singles chronology
"Sex on the Streets" (1994)	"Happiness" (1995)	"Trippin' on Sunshine" (1996)

Music video
- "Happiness" on YouTube

"Happiness" is a song by British electronic music duo Pizzaman, which consisted of John Reid and Norman Cook, released in November 1995 by Loaded Records as the third single from the duo's only album, Pizzamania (1995). The song contains a sample of "Five Songs by Four Voices" performed by English poet, artist and musician Edward Barton, and uses a backbeat from "Break 4 Love" by Raze. "Happiness" peaked at number 19 on the UK Singles Chart and number three on the UK Dance Chart. Its music video was directed by American filmmaker and photojournalist Michael Dominic. Del Monte Foods corporation used the song in a UK fruit juice ad.

== Critical reception ==
Michael Bonner from Melody Maker commented, "Achieving something of a godlike status in the minds of me and my best pal, May, for his work on Mighty Dub Katz' 'Magic Carpet Ride', Pizzaman presses all the right buttons again with a catchy blast of techno-laced happy house. Bedroom bouncing stuff." Alan Jones from Music Week wrote, "Easily my favourite single of the week is 'Happiness', the barnstorming release from Norman Cook's latest alter-ego Pizzaman. Its swirl of influences include jazzy piano frills, gospelly vocals, a backbeat lifted from 'Break 4 Love', Sixties-style organ, Seventies-style synth and much more. They all dovetail together perfectly." Brad Beatnik from the Record Mirror Dance Update gave it a score of four out of five, adding, "Norman Cook and the Playboys finally release one of the most uptempo and infectious tracks on their debut album. The Club mix and Playboys dub use less of the singalong vocal and stick to harder grooves while the original and Euro-versions go for the real hands-in-the-air effect. A definite party anthem."

== Track listings ==
- 12-inch, UK (1995)
1. "Happiness" (Club Mix) — 6:55
2. "Happiness" (Play Boys Fully Loaded Dub) — 7:52
3. "Happiness" (Original 12" Mix) — 5:22
4. "Happiness" (Euro Mix) — 5:21
- CD single, UK (1995)
1. "Happiness" (Eat Me Edit) — 3:28
2. "Happiness" (Club Mix) — 6:57
3. "Happiness" (Play Boys Fully Loaded Dub) — 7:54
4. "Happiness" (Original Mix) — 5:24
5. "Happiness" (Euro Mix) — 5:24
6. "Happiness" (Play Boys Fully Loaded Dub II) — 7:12
- CD maxi, Europe (1995)
1. "Happiness" (Eat Me Edit) — 3:26
2. "Happiness" (Club Mix) — 6:55
3. "Happiness" (Play Boys Fully Loaded Dub) — 7:52
4. "Happiness" (Original Mix) — 5:22
5. "Happiness" (Euro Mix) — 5:21
6. "Happiness" (Play Boys Fully Loaded Dub II) — 7:11
7. "Happiness" (Bonus Mix) — 4:54

== Charts ==
Weekly chart performance for "Happiness"
Chart (1995–1996)	Peak position
Australia (ARIA)	64
Europe (Eurochart Hot 100)	79
Quebec (ADISQ)	31
Scotland (OCC)	24
UK Singles (OCC)	19
UK Dance (OCC)	3
UK Club Chart (Music Week)	5
