= Trippin' on Sunshine =

Single by Pizzaman

from the album Pizzamania
- Released: October 1994; 1996 (re-release)
- Genre: Big beat; house; latin; salsa
- Length: 3:52 (1994); 3:25 (1996)
- Label: Loaded Records; Cowboy Records
- Songwriter: Pizzaman
- Producer: Pizzaman

Pizzaman singles chronology
"Trippin' on Sunshine" (1994)	"Sex on the Streets" (1995)

Music video
- "Trippin' on Sunshine" on YouTube

"Trippin' on Sunshine" is the debut single by British electronic music duo Pizzaman, consisting of John Reid and Norman Cook, released in October 1994, by labels Loaded Records and Cowboy Records, as the first single from their only album, Pizzamania (1995). The "You, me, all of us, are looking for the key..." vocal sample in the song is taken from the 1968 single "World of Love" by Canadian R&B/soul band Mandala. And the "Trippin' on Sunshine" vocal sample is from "Accapella Sunshine" by Rockers Revenge featuring Donnie Calvin.

It peaked at number 33 on the UK Singles Chart, but after the success of the duo's next singles, "Sex on the Streets" and "Happiness", the song was re-released in 1996, this time peaking at number 18. It is their highest-charting single to date. It also reached number two on the UK Dance Chart and number 26 in Scotland.

== Critical reception ==
Larry Flick from Billboard magazine wrote, "This time, he [Norman Cook] lifts punters into the air with 'Tripping on Sunshine', a jam that deftly melds a thick house vibe with racing rave aggression and tight trance rhythm precision. Ultimately pretty bright stuff". Andy Beevers from Music Week's RM Dance Update noted, "Norman Cook's latest is a stridently upbeat track that manages to be bubbly without being lightweight. The driving keyboards alternate with summery latin themes, while the vocals consist of a hippyish rant and the breezy title line." In his weekly RM dance column, James Hamilton named it a "Norman Cook's hoarsely started swirling and building breezy Latin flavoured 0-127.9-0bpm romp". Upon the 1996 re-release, he wrote that "Norman Cook's exuberant salsa kicker from summer 1994 swirlingly builds through hoarse roaring, reedy organ and a Rocker's Revenge refrain in its exciting original 0-127.9-0bpm Pizzaman Club Mix".

== Music video ==
A music video was produced to promote the song, directed by American filmmaker and photojournalist Michael Dominic. It was later made available on YouTube in 2010.

== Track listing ==
- 12", UK (1994)
1. "Trippin on Sunshine"
2. "Mixing Thing"
3. "Trippin on Sunshine" (Dub)
4. "DJ Delite #4"
- 12", UK (1996)
1. "Trippin' on Sunshine" (Biff & Memphis Mix) — 9:52
2. "Trippin' on Sunshine" (Playboys Mixing Thing) — 4:11
3. "Trippin' on Sunshine" (Pizzaman Club Mix) — 6:55
4. "Trippin' on Sunshine" (Impulsion Big Pizza π Mix) — 6:34
- CD single, UK (1994)
1. "Trippin' on Sunshine" (Radio Edit) — 3:52
2. "Trippin' on Sunshine" (Play Boys Mixing Thing) — 4:11
3. "Trippin' on Sunshine" (Pizzaman Mix) — 6:55
4. "Trippin' on Sunshine" (California Sunshine Mix) — 7:35
5. "Trippin' on Sunshine" (12" Play Boys Fully Loaded Dub) — 7:50
- CD single, UK (1996)
1. "Trippin' on Sunshine" (Radio Edit) — 3:25
2. "Trippin' on Sunshine" (Biff & Memphis Mix) — 9:52
3. "Trippin' on Sunshine" (Pizzaman Club Mix) — 6:55
4. "Trippin' on Sunshine" (California Sunshine Mix) — 7:36
5. "Trippin' on Sunshine" (Playboys Dub) — 7:48

== Charts ==
=== Weekly charts ===
Chart (1994)	Peak position
Scotland (OCC)	41
UK Singles (OCC)	33
UK Dance (OCC)	2
UK Club Chart (Music Week)	5

Chart (1996)	Peak position
Australia (ARIA)	140
Scotland (OCC)	26
UK Singles (OCC)	18
UK Dance (OCC)	5
UK Club Chart (Music Week)	8

=== Year-end charts ===
Chart (1994)	Position
UK Club Chart (Music Week)	20
