= Reach (Judy Cheeks song) =

1994 single by Judy Cheeks

Single by Judy Cheeks

from the album Respect
- Released: 25 April 1994
- Studio: Sarm West Studios, London
- Genre: Disco; gospel; house; synth-pop
- Length: 3:48
- Label: Positiva
- Songwriters: Jim Dyke; Nina Ossoff
- Producer: Brothers In Rhythm

Judy Cheeks singles chronology
"So In Love (The Real Deal)" (1993)	"Reach" (1994)	"This Time" (1995)

Music video
- "Reach" on YouTube

"Reach" is a song by American singer and actress Judy Cheeks, released in April 1994 by Positiva Records as the second single from the singer's fifth album, Respect (1996). The track was written by Jim Dyke and Nina Ossoff, and produced by Brothers In Rhythm, peaking at number 17 on the UK Singles Chart and number 21 on the US Billboard Hot Dance Club Play chart. In 1996, it was re-released in a new remix which charted at number 22 in the UK. Both versions were successful in clubs, and they both reached number-one on the UK Club Chart. Its accompanying music video was directed by Kate Garner. American singer Patti Austin covered the song on her tenth album, That Secret Place (1994).

== Critical reception ==
Upon the release, Larry Flick from Billboard magazine named the song "a pop/disco bauble produced by the eternally fab Brothers In Rhythm". When it was re-released, he wrote, "To active clubgoers, this UK-brewed slice of disco/NRG melodrama has practically earned "classic" status. Finally available domestically, this anthem is ready to knock down a few top 40 and crossover radio doors. Cheeks has a presence that is, by turns, charming and commanding, holding up well against the track's busy arrangement of piano rolls and swirling strings. Dig into the half-dozen remixes and find the one that works for you." Pan-European magazine Music & Media stated, "Dance and gospel make a fine couple. Supported by backing vocals steadily growing to church choir proportions, Judy fills her cheeks to be heard on top of everything."

Andy Beevers from Music Week gave the song a top score of five out of five and named it Pick of the Week in the category of Dance, writing, "Cheeks' powerful gospel-influenced vocals are backed by a big, brash house production from the Brothers In Rhythm plus a cooler garage groove from Mount Rushmore. These mixes have taken the track to the top of the Club Chart and another Top 40 mainstream chart placing looks likely." Angela Lewis from NME remarked, "When Judy Cheeks howls strong and high, she takes you right up there with her." She concluded, "There is nothing to do but bask in the sunshine of that effortlessly gorgeous gospel voice" and "bop to that synth-pop glory of a tune". James Hamilton from the Record Mirror Dance Update named it a "joyous jumpy gospel romp" in his weekly dance column. Leesa Daniels from Smash Hits gave it two out of five, adding, "Not very original, but a hit all the same."

== Chart performance ==
"Reach" became a massive club hit in Europe after its first release in 1994. It debuted at its highest position as number 17 on the UK Singles Chart on May 1, 1994. The following weeks the song dropped to number 23, 45, 70 and 97, with a total of 5 weeks in the chart. In the Netherlands, it reached number 13 on the Dutch Top 40 Tipparade and number seven on the Dutch Single Tip. On the Billboard Hot Dance Club Play chart in the US, it reached its best position as number 21 on June 25, 1994. It stayed within the chart for 8 weeks. In Canada, "Reach" peaked at number nine on the RPM Dance/Urban chart. In 1996, the song was remixed by Dancing Divaz (an alias of UK music producer Ian Bland) and peaked at number 22 in the UK on January 7. Then it dropped to number 34 and 53, before leaving the chart. On Music Week's RM Club Chart, it peaked at number-one on December 23, 1995.

== Music video ==
The music video for "Reach" was directed by British photographer and singer Kate Garner. Sarah Bayliss produced it and Nick Sawyer directed photography. In the video, Cheeks performs in a hallway between different apartments with four shirtless male dancers. Occasionally, a female dancer in red dress also appears. In between, one of the apartment doors opens and the resident appears briefly, checking out what's going on in the hallway.

== Track listing ==
- 7", UK (1994)
1. "Reach" (Brothers In Rhythm Radio Edit) — 3:48
2. "Can't Get Enough" — 4:28
- 12", UK (1994)
1. "Reach" (Brothers In Rhythm Club Mix) — 9:11
2. "Reach" (Mount Rushmore Attack That Track Vocal) — 6:32
3. "Reach" (Big Brother Mix) — 7:08
4. "Reach" (Mount Rushmore Attack That Track Dub) — 6:01
- 12" single, UK (1995)
1. "Reach" (Dancing Divaz Club Mix) — 7:13
2. "Reach" (Tommy's Club Mix) — 8:53
3. "Reach" (Quivver Vocal Mix) — 7:57
4. "Reach" (Pizzaman Dub) — 5:47
- CD single, Europe (1994)
1. "Reach" (Brothers In Rhythm Radio Edit) — 3:48
2. "Reach" (Big Brothers Mix) — 7:08
3. "Reach" (Mount Rushmore Attack That Track Vocal) — 6:32
4. "Can't Get Enough" — 4:28
- CD maxi, US (1996)
1. "Reach" (Brothers In Rhythm Original Radio Edit) — 3:46
2. "Reach" (Dancing Divaz Radio Edit) — 3:53
3. "Reach" (Brothers In Rhythm Club Mix) — 9:32
4. "Reach" (Dancing Divaz Club Mix) — 7:13
5. "Reach" (Tommy's Club Mix) — 5:47
6. "Reach" (Quivver Vocal Mix) — 7:57

== Charts ==
=== Weekly charts ===
Chart (1994)	Peak position
Europe (Eurochart Hot 100)	64
Europe (European Dance Radio)	3
Netherlands (Dutch Top 40 Tipparade)	13
Netherlands (Dutch Single Tip)	7
Scotland (OCC)	90
UK Singles (OCC)	17
UK Airplay (Music Week)	23
UK Dance (Music Week)	2
UK Club Chart (Music Week)	1
US Hot Dance Club Play (Billboard)	21

Chart (1995–1996)	Peak position
Canada Dance/Urban (RPM)	9
Europe (Eurochart Hot 100)	50
Scotland (OCC)	26
UK Singles (OCC)	22
UK Dance (OCC)	7
UK Club Chart (Music Week)	1

=== Year-end charts ===
Chart (1994)	Position
UK Club Chart (Music Week)	3

Chart (1995)	Position
UK Club Chart (Music Week)	45

== Patti Austin version ==
"Reach"

Single by Patti Austin

from the album That Secret Place
- Released: 1994
- Studio: Bass Hit Studios
- Genre: House
- Length: 3:48
- Label: MCA-GRP
- Songwriters: Jim Dyke; Nina Ossoff
- Producer: Lee Ritenour

Patti Austin singles chronology
"I'll Keep Your Dreams Alive" (1992)	"Reach" (1994)

Same year as "Reach" was released by Cheeks, American singer Patti Austin covered the song and included it on her tenth album, That Secret Place (1994). Her version was produced by Lee Ritenour and features backing vocals by Phil Perry, Tata Vega and Vesta Williams. The single reached number four on the US Billboard Hot Dance Club Play chart (Cheeks' version reached number 24). "Reach" also became Austin's last charting hit.

=== Critical reception ===
Larry Flick from Billboard magazine wrote, "Import hounds will recognize the tune from Judy Cheeks' smashing U.K. single. Austin gives it a lazy and jazzy feel, fitting comfortably inside the muscular house rhythms provided by Hex Hector and Darrin Friedman. Comparisons between the singles are inevitable, but not fair. Each has notable strengths. This track should do the job in bringing Austin back into the pop and club forefront—where she belongs."

=== Track listing ===
- CD maxi-single, US (1994)
1. "Reach" (Club Mix) — 7:41
2. "Reach" (R & B Radio 7" Mix) — 3:48
3. "Reach" (Dub Mix) — 9:48

=== Charts ===
Chart (1994)	Peak position
US Hot Dance Club Play (Billboard)	4
US Maxi-Singles Sales (Billboard)	24
