= Keep Me Warm =

Keep Me Warm may refer to:

- "Keep Me Warm", a song by Beres Hammond from One Love, One Life
- "Keep Me Warm", a song by Cliff Richard from Stronger
- "Keep Me Warm", a song by Ida Maria from Fortress Round My Heart
- "Keep Me Warm", a song by Melba Montgomery from Melba Montgomery
- "Keep Me Warm", a song by Carita Holmström
- "Keep Me Warm", a song by Vian Izak and Juniper Vale

== See also ==
- "To Keep Me Warm", a song by Emma Louise from Vs Head vs Heart
- "Keep Warm", a song by Italian band Jinny
