= Natural Thing =

Natural Thing may refer to:

- Natural Thing (Juliet Roberts album), 1994
- Natural Thing (Tanya Blount album), 1994
- Natural Thing, an album by Poi Dog Pondering
- "Natural Thing", a song by Innocence
- "Natural Thing", a song by UFO on their album No Heavy Petting
- The Natural Thing, 1989 album by Jonathan Edwards
- The Natural Thing (album), a 1968 album by Jack McDuff
