= Paul Taylor (DJ) =

- Born: 5 August 1957 (age 68); Aberdeen, Scotland
- Genres: Electronica, house
- Occupations: DJ, producer
- Website: http://www.retroevents.com/

Paul Taylor (born 5 August 1957) is a Scottish electronic DJ and musician.

== Early life ==
Taylor was born in Aberdeen, Scotland and moved to Burnley, Lancashire at the age of 13. He later studied Graphic design at Burnley Grammar School and Blackpool College.

== Career ==
=== Angels ===
In 1974, at the age of 16, Taylor was offered his first job as a DJ for Angels. In 1989, Taylor and his business partner, Steve Farkas, purchased Angels.

=== Visionmasters ===
Under the name Visionmasters, Taylor, Danny Hibrid and Tony King released "Keep on Pumpin' It" in 1991 featuring vocals from Kylie Minogue.

=== Loveland ===
Taylor, along with Paul Waterman and Mark Hadfield and vocalist Rachel McFarlane, formed the disco-house group Loveland in the early 1990s. Tracks such as "Let the Music (Lift You Up)", "Don't Make Me Wait", "I Need Somebody" and "The Wonder of Love" increased the group's fame during 1994–95.

=== Dream FM ===
Taylor was a DJ on 1990s Leeds pirate radio station Dream FM.

=== Retro ===
In 1989, Taylor dedicated the final hour on Friday nights at Angels to music released in the previous 3 or 4 years. This is where the brand of club night called Retro began. It soon developed into a monthly night. By the time the club closed in 1996, Retro nights where already being held at clubs across the northwest. Retro started at Eden in San Antonio, Ibiza in 2000 winning Mixmag's New Club of the Year award.
