= Wrap Me Up =

Wrap Me Up may refer to:

- "Wrap Me Up" (Alex Party song), 1995
- "Wrap Me Up" (Jimmy Fallon and Meghan Trainor song), 2023
- "Wrap Me Up", a 2021 song by American R&B singer Jhené Aiko
