= Don't Give Me Your Life =

1995 single by Alex Party

- Italian 12-inch single artwork

Single by Alex Party

from the album Alex Party
- Released: 6 February 1995
- Genre: Eurodance; Italo house
- Length: 5:33 (album version/classic Alex Party mix); 3:16 (classic edit)
- Label: UMM
- Songwriter: Robin 'Shanie' Campbell
- Producers: Paolo Visnadi; Gianni Visnadi; DJ Alex Natale

Alex Party singles chronology
""Alex Party/Read My Lips/Saturday Night Party" (1993)	"Don't Give Me Your Life" (1995)	"Wrap Me Up" (1995)

Music video
- "Don't Give Me Your Life" on YouTube

"Don't Give Me Your Life" is a song by Italian dance music group Alex Party. It is produced by Italian producer brothers Paolo and Gianni Visnadi with DJ Alex Natale, and was released in February 1995 as the first single from the group's first and only album, Alex Party (1996). The vocals are performed by British singer Robin 'Shanie' Campbell, who also wrote the lyrics and melody. The song peaked at number two in the UK and number five on the US Billboard Dance Club Play chart. It also topped the Club Record category at Music Week's 1995 Awards. Today, it is widely regarded as one of the biggest dance anthems of the 1990s. Idolator ranked it number 21 in their list of "The 50 Best Pop Singles of 1995" in 2015.

In 1999, "Don't Give Me Your Life" was re-released, with new mixes included and a full length bonus track, "Megamix" from 1994. A music video was produced twice for the song; in 1995 and 1999.

== Background ==
After the success with their first single, "Read My Lips/Saturday Night Party" which peaked at number 29 in the UK and became an Ibiza anthem during the summer of 1993, producers and brothers Paolo and Gianni Visnadi, with DJ Alex Natale, wanted to create something more oriented to the underground scene. But they then decided to add a voice to it. Through their label they were introduced to British singer Robin 'Shanie' Campbell, who wrote the lyrics for "Don't Give Me Your Life". The lyrics tells the story of a woman that tells her man that she doesn't need him anymore. He has been treating her badly, cheating on her and she has had enough, telling him that she don't need his love/life.

The quartet's varied experiences gave the song a unique sound and a sophisticated flare compared to the other stomping grooves at the time. The means of productions back then were not like today, and the production phase was actually more challenging. The hardest part was the huge amount of work during the assembly, once the vocals were recorded on tape. After that, every single phrase from the vocals was sampled individually and controlled via midi with an Atari computer.

== Critical reception ==
Larry Flick from American magazine Billboard wrote, "This popular U.K. import, is showing early signs of widespread approval from a variety of dance programmers. Producer Visnadi and Alex Natale offer a jumpy bassline and carnival-like keyboards, while resident singer Shanie bumps and grinds with giddy abandon. The chorus will have you reaching for your tambourine and platform boots." Another Billboard editor, Mark Dezzani, said, "The single, like the tracks from the pioneering Italian dance act Black Box, epitomizes Italy's knack for producing perfect pop tunes using the latest in musical technology." Robbie Daw from Idolator declared it as a "kiss-off anthem" and "one big F U to a no-good ex". He complimented Campbell as "the epitome of powerhouse dance diva." In his weekly UK chart commentary, James Masterton viewed it as "a brilliantly commercial piece of dance". Pan-European magazine Music & Media commented, "Vocals by Shanie, rap by Danny Johnston; assemble these two elements and you get one of the catchiest Euro tracks currently available." Alan Jones from Music Week said, "A startlingly simple but hugely effective Italo-NRG bouncer with an impossibly catchy chorus, it could go all the way." Iestyn George from NME wrote, "Perky handbag ditty with neat vocal snatches, a snappy piano break and the requisite number of peaks and drops that hit all the right places." James Hamilton from the Record Mirror Dance Update described it as a "girl sung sometimes somewhat Whigfield-ishly tinged (but no ducks!) jaunty Euro romp" in his weekly dance column.

"Don't Give Me Your Life" was ranked number 21 in Idolator's list of "The 50 Best Pop Singles Of 1995" in 2015. It was also ranked number nine in Attitude's list of "The Top 10 Dance Tunes Of The '90s" in 2016.

== Chart performance ==
"Don't Give Me Your Life" reached number two in Ireland and the United Kingdom, becoming their highest-charting hit in those countries. In the UK, it peaked at number two on 5 March 1995, during its fourth week on the UK Singles Chart. The single spent two weeks at that position. It also peaked at number six in Iceland, number 16 in Denmark and the Netherlands, and number 18 in the group's native Italy. In addition, it topped both Music Week's Pop Tip Club Chart and the Club Record category at Music Week's 1995 Awards. On the Eurochart Hot 100, it reached number nine on 11 March. Outside Europe, "Don't Give Me Your Life" was successful on the US Billboard Dance Club Play chart, where it reached number five. In Israel, it reached number two in its fifth week on the chart, on 28 March 1995, and it spent eight weeks in total within the chart. Australia, it packed at number 13 on the ARIA Singles Chart. "Don't Give Me Your Life" was awarded with a gold record in the UK, with sales and streaming figures exceeding 400,000 units.

== Music video ==
A music video was produced to promote the single, directed by La La Land, who had previously directed videos for other acts like 2 Unlimited ("No One") and Whigfield ("Saturday Night"). "Don't Give Me Your Life" features singer Robin 'Shanie' Campbell and dancers. She wears a white high neck sweater and performs toward a dark background. The male dancer in the video is actor and dancer Jake Canuso, known for his role in the British TV series Benidorm, in which he plays barman Mateo Castellanos. "Don't Give Me Your Life" was a Box Top for five weeks on British music television channel The Box from March 1995. It was also B-listed on Germany's VIVA in May 1995 and MTV Europe put the video on prime break out rotation same month.

== Live performances ==
Alex Party and Robin 'Shanie' Campbell performed "Don't Give Me Your Life" in the British music chart television programme Top of the Pops three times in 1995. The first performance was on 16 February, after reaching number 10 on the UK Singles Chart. Then on 2 March, after reaching number three with 150 000 copies sold, and again on 16 March, after reaching number two with 350 000 copies sold.

== Track listing ==
- Italy Vinyl, 12-inch (1994)
1. "Don't Give Me Your Life" (Original Mix) — 5:13
2. "Don't Give Me Your Life" (Classic Alex Party Mix) — 5:33
3. "Don't Give Me Your Life" (LWS Remix) — 4:39
4. "Don't Give Me Your Life" (LWS DJ's Choice Instrumental) — 5:03
- UK Vinyl single, 7-inch (1994)
1. "Don't Give Me Your Life" (Classic Edit) — 3:16
2. "Don't Give Me Your Life" (Dancing Divaz Edit)
3. "Don't Give Me Your Life" (Saturday Night FMS Edit)
- UK CD single (1995)
1. "Don't Give Me Your Life" (Classic Edit) — 3:16
2. "Don't Give Me Your Life" (Classic Alex Party Mix (V1)) — 6:31
3. "Don't Give Me Your Life" (Dancing Divaz Edit) — 3:10
4. "Don't Give Me Your Life" (Saturday Night FMS Edit) — 4:34
5. "Don't Give Me Your Life" (Dancing Divaz Club Mix) — 8:16
6. "Don't Give Me Your Life" (Classic Alex Party Mix) — 5:33
7. "Don't Give Me Your Life" (Original Mix) — 5:13
8. "Don't Give Me Your Life" (LWS Bitch Mix) — 4:41
- Netherlands Maxi-Single (1995)
1. "Don't Give Me Your Life" (Original Radio Version) — 3:35
2. "Don't Give Me Your Life" (Classic Alex Party Radio Version) — 3:58
3. "Don't Give Me Your Life" (Dancing Divaz Edit) — 3:10
4. "Don't Give Me Your Life" (Saturday Night FMS) — 4:33
5. "Don't Give Me Your Life" (LWS Bitch Mix) — 4:41
6. "Don't Give Me Your Life" (Original Mix) — 5:13
7. "Don't Give Me Your Life" (Dancing Divaz Club Mix) — 8:15
8. "Don't Give Me Your Life" (Dancing Divaz Rhythm Mix) — 6:02
9. "Don't Give Me Your Life" (Classic Alex Party) — 5:33
- US Maxi-Single (1995)
1. "Don't Give Me Your Life" (Classic Edit) — 3:16
2. "Don't Give Me Your Life" (Dancing Divaz Edit) — 3:07
3. "Don't Give Me Your Life" (Classic Alex Party Mix (V1)) — 6:31
4. "Don't Give Me Your Life" (Dancing Divaz Club Mix) — 8:13
5. "Don't Give Me Your Life" (LWS Bitch Mix) — 4:40
- Sweden Maxi-Single (Remix) (1995)
1. "Don't Give Me Your Life" (Pierre J's Alternative Radio Remix) — 3:38
2. "Don't Give Me Your Life" (Pierre J's Full Organ Remix) — 8:48
3. "Don't Give Me Your Life" (Orgasmic Mix) — 7:21
4. "Don't Give Me Your Life" (June Party) — 4:12

== Charts ==
=== Weekly charts ===
Chart (1995)	Peak position
Australia (ARIA)	13
Denmark (IFPI)	16
Europe (Eurochart Hot 100)	9
Europe (European Dance Radio)	4
Europe (European Hit Radio)	30
Germany (GfK)	24
Iceland (Íslenski Listinn Topp 40)	6
Ireland (IRMA)	2
Israel (Israeli Singles Chart)	2
Italy (Musica e dischi)	18
Netherlands (Dutch Top 40)	17
Netherlands (Single Top 100)	16
Scottish Singles Sales (Official Charts)	2
Switzerland (Schweizer Hitparade)	30
UK Singles (Official Charts)	2
UK Dance (Official Charts)	3
UK Singles (Music & Media)	1
UK Airplay (Music Week)	5
UK Club Chart (Music Week)	1
UK Pop Tip Club Chart (Music Week)	1
US Dance Club Play (Billboard)	5

=== Year-end charts ===
Chart (1995)	Position
Australia (ARIA)	82
Europe (Eurochart Hot 100)	67
Germany (Media Control)	99
Netherlands (Dutch Top 40)	151
UK Singles (OCC)	28
UK Airplay (Music Week)	28
UK Club Chart (Music Week)	49
UK Pop Tip Club Chart (Music Week)	1

== Certifications ==
Region	Certification	Certified units/sales
United Kingdom (BPI)	Gold	400,000^{‡}
^{‡} Sales+streaming figures based on certification alone.
