= Keep Warm =

Single by Jinny
- Released: 1991
- Genre: Eurodance; Italo house
- Length: 3:45
- Label: Italian Style Production; Virgin Records
- Songwriters: Alessandro Gilardi; Walter Cremonini
- Producer: Walter Cremonini

Jinny singles chronology
"I Need Your Love" (1990)	"Keep Warm" (1991)	"Never Give Up" (1992)

Music video
- "Keep Warm" on YouTube

"Keep Warm" is a song by Italian band Jinny, fronted by British singer and TV host Carryl Varley. Originally released in 1991 as a single only in the UK by Virgin Records as part of the Italo House boom of the late 80s/early 90s, it featured samples from "Taking Him Off Your Hands" by Mahogany Watkins, La Velle's 1979 track "Playgirl" and "What Happened to the Music" by The Trammps, with the hook coming from a 1987 track called "Keep It Warm" by Voices in the Dark.

As it was released two years after Black Box, when rave and indie-dance provided the dancefloor hits of the age, "Keep Warm" peaked low in the Top 75 at number 68. However, with Eurodance becoming popular in the UK around 1994 (with this 'Commercial European Dance' boom seeing labels like Media setting up a UK office), the license to the track was picked up by Telstar Records was re-issued by their dance music label Multiply, becoming a Top-20 hit. It peaked at number 11 on the UK Singles Chart, and reached number-one on the UK Dance Singles Chart.

== Critical reception ==
Upon the 1991 release, Seamus Quinn from NME commented, "Well, the Italians have proved time and time again that they are good at this sort of thing: catchy pop house. However much you may dislike the piano (arms raised in the middle bit) formula, this one's a bit of a stormer; a floor-filler and then some. Kicks off with the Bingo Boys vocal sample and gets down with some pants, horns and, of course, loads of piano and stuff. No one seem to know where the perpetual vocal refrain keep me warm comes from, so it may actually be really sung by Jinny! Should do very well in the British charts, and apparently it's coming here via Virgin."

After the song was re-released in 1995, James Masterton noted in his weekly UK chart commentary, that the song "has remained something of a classic club anthem, in a similar manner to Baby D's 'Let Me Be Your Fantasy' and now finally comes above ground to become the hit you always felt it should be." Alan Jones from Music Week wrote, "A small hit when first released on Virgin in 1991, Jinny's 'Keep Warm' is a classic latterday Italo-house song. Now remixed in 'Don't Give Me Your Life' style by Alex Party, with other new stylings by T-Empo and Blu Peter along with the original, it has taken off like a rocket in the clubs and looks destined for major chart success." Brad Beatnik from the Record Mirror Dance Update commented, "Yeah, yeah, yeah – sure, you know this one but spare a few minutes for a couple of fine remixes. The frenetic pace of the original is replaced by a deep, Euro-styled dub from Alex Party that makes the most of the chorus while T-Empo simply spice up the original sound and Blu Peter goes for hard Euro trance; the original is included too. A bargain."

== Track listing ==
- 7", UK (1991)
1. "Keep Warm" (7" Mix) — 3:45
2. "Keep Warm" (Another Mix) — 3:45
- 12", Italy (1991)
1. "Keep Warm" (Extended Mix) — 5:50
2. "Keep Warm" (Short Version) — 3:45
3. "Keep Warm" (Another Version) — 3:45
- CD single, UK (1995)
1. "Keep Warm" (Original (7" Edit)) — 3:45
2. "Keep Warm" (Alex Party Hot Mix) — 4:51
3. "Keep Warm" (T-Empo's Balearic Ballistic Mix) — 9:36
4. "Keep Warm" (Blu Peter's "New NRG" Mix) — 7:09
5. "Keep Warm" (Alex Party "Here We Go" Version) — 4:45

== Charts ==
=== Weekly charts ===
Chart (1991)	Peak position
UK Singles (OCC)	68
UK Dance (Music Week)	13
UK Club Chart (Record Mirror)	12
US Billboard Hot 100	97
US Hot Dance Club Play (Billboard)	13

Chart (1995)	Peak position
Australia (ARIA)	136
Europe (Eurochart Hot 100)	23
Europe (European Dance Radio)	10
Scotland (OCC)	11
UK Singles (OCC)	11
UK Dance (OCC)	1
UK Airplay (Music Week)	20
UK Pop Tip Club Chart (Music Week)	6

=== Year-end charts ===
Chart (1995)	Position
UK Club Chart (Music Week)	53
