= I Want You (Juliet Roberts song) =

1994 single by Juliet Roberts

Single by Juliet Roberts

from the album Natural Thing
- A-side: "Again"
- B-side: "Force of Nature"
- Released: 7 March 1994
- Genre: Pop-disco; soul
- Length: 4:05
- Label: Cooltempo; Slam Jam
- Songwriters: Juliet Roberts; Nathaniel Pierre Jones
- Producer: Dancin' Danny D

Juliet Roberts singles chronology
| "Caught in the Middle" (1994) | "I Want You" (1994) | "Never Had a Love Like This Before" (1996) |

Music video
- "I Want You" on YouTube

"I Want You" is a song by English singer-songwriter Juliet Roberts, released in March 1994, by Cooltempo Records, as the second single from her debut album, Natural Thing (1994). Originally released as a double A-side with her song "Again", it was then released as its own single following the success of its predecessor, "Caught in the Middle", in 1994. Co-written by Roberts with Nathaniel Pierre Jones, it was produced by Dancin' Danny D and peaked at number one on the US Billboard Hot Dance Club Play chart and number 44 on the Billboard Hot 100. In Europe, it peaked at number 28 on the UK Singles Chart, but was more successful on the Music Week Dance Singles chart, reaching number three in October 1994. The accompanying music video was directed by American filmmaker and comic artist Antoine Fuqua and nominated for Best Clip of the Year and Best New Artist Clip of the Year, both in the category for Dance at the 1994 Billboard Music Video Awards.

== Critical reception ==
Larry Flick from Billboard magazine wrote, "Roberts easily rises above the throng of big-voiced dance divas by working a delivery that includes more than merely belting high-pitch shrieks. She has an interesting middle range and a playful style of phrasing that is further embellished by immeasurable charisma. All these elements add up to a gleeful pop/disco anthem that is essential for club disciples, as well as those at pop radio who are brave enough to go for something fresh and exciting." Dave Sholin from the Gavin Report said, "She cites Sam Cooke, Gladys Knight and the Temptations as some of her early musical influences, and that propensity for soul music is evident on this track." He added, "Full of high energy and exciting." Chuck Campbell from Knoxville News Sentinel named it a "uplifting single" and a "joyous dance number with a great hook." In his weekly UK chart commentary, James Masterton deemed it "a fairly standard piece of dance/soul". Jennifer Nine from Melody Maker complimented it as "smoochy, romantic, nice voice, radio-friendly".

Pan-European magazine Music & Media wrote, "'Canned violins' make a striking intro to the 'monster album edit' only, without doubt the most suitable remix of the fast soul song for daytime radio play." Andy Beevers from Music Week gave it a score of four out of five and named it Pick of the Week in the category of Dance, saying, "This very catchy song was released earlier this year as the flipside to the ballad 'Again'. Now it gets the star billing it always deserved. The new remixes from K Klass and Junior Vasquez have taken it to the UK Club Chart and another crossover hit is on the cards." He also noted in the magazine's Record Mirror Dance Update, "The good news is that it has been well worth waiting for. 'I Want You' features the usual big vocal performance that has bags of soul and does not fall short in the catchiness stakes." In his weekly Record Mirror dance music column, James Hamilton named it a "storming bouncy strutter" and "soaringly wailed bouncy chanter". Leesa Daniels from Smash Hits said the beginning of the song "sounds exactly the same" as "Reneissance" by M People.

== Track listings ==
- 12-inch, UK (1994)
1. "I Want You" (Our Tribe mix)
2. "I Want You" (K-Klass Dominoe dub)
3. "I Want You" (Monster club mix)
- CD single, UK (1994)
1. "I Want You" (Monster album edit) — 4:06
2. "I Want You" (Our Tribe edit) — 4:17
3. "I Want You" (K-Klass Klub mix) — 7:06
4. "I Want You" (Monster club mix) — 8:53
5. "I Want You" (Our Tribe mix) — 7:14
6. "I Want You" (K-Klass Dominoe dub) — 5:50
- CD maxi, US (1994)
1. "I Want You" (single edit) — 4:05
2. "I Want You" (extended mix) — 7:09
3. "Force of Nature" (album version) — 4:21
4. "I Want You" (Monster club mix) — 9:57
5. "I Want You" (album version) — 5:00

== Charts ==
=== Weekly charts ===
Weekly chart performance for "I Want You"
| Chart (1994) | Peak positions |
|---|---|
| Canada Retail Singles (The Record) | 13 |
| Canada Top Singles (RPM) | 51 |
| Europe (Eurochart Hot 100) with "Again" | 82 |
| Europe (Eurochart Hot 100) | 89 |
| Scotland (OCC) | 46 |
| UK Singles (OCC) with "Again" | 33 |
| UK Singles (OCC) | 28 |
| UK Airplay (Music Week) | 39 |
| UK Dance (Music Week) | 3 |
| UK Club Chart (Music Week) with "Again" | 1 |
| UK Club Chart (Music Week) | 1 |
| US Billboard Hot 100 | 44 |
| US Dance Singles Sales (Billboard) | 15 |
| US Hot Dance Club Play (Billboard) | 1 |
| US Hot R&B/Hip-Hop Songs (Billboard) | 78 |
| US Cash Box Top 100 | 27 |

=== Year-end charts ===
Year-end chart performance for "I Want You"
| Chart (1994) | Position |
|---|---|
| UK Club Chart (Music Week) | 12 |
| US Hot Dance Club Play (Billboard) | 6 |
