= A.D.O.R. =

US hip hop artist (1969–2025)

A.D.O.R
- Born: Eddy Castellanos; September 26, 1969; New York City, U.S.
- Died: 1 January 2025 (aged 55) New York City, U.S.
- Genre: Hip hop
- Years active: 1992–2025
- Label: Atlantic Records

Eddy Castellanos Sr. (September 26, 1969 – January 1, 2025), known professionally as A.D.O.R., was an American hip hop artist whose work includes the Pete Rock-produced hit "Let It All Hang Out" (Atlantic, 1992), and "One for the Trouble" (Atlantic, 1994), produced by K-Def. The latter has been sampled extensively in later songs, most famously in "Renegade Master" by Roger "Wildchild" McKenzie.

== Biography ==
=== Early life and career ===
Castellanos was born in Washington Heights, New York City. His father was a musician by profession, and as a child Castellanos attended his shows. At six years of age he moved with his family to Mount Vernon, New York, later to be known in hip hop circles as "money earnin' Mount Vernon" due to the preponderance of rap stars it produced. The future A.D.O.R. went to high school there, where he met Sean Combs, Heavy D, Al B. Sure, and Pete Rock. Becoming interested in hip hop, he took the name A.D.O.R. (standing for both "Another Dimension of Rhythm" and "A Declaration of Revolution"). Sean Combs, by this time working at Uptown Records, began presenting A.D.O.R.'s demo tapes to record companies. Heavy D's DJ, DJ Eddie F, secured him a management and production deal. In 1992 he recorded his first record, the single "Let It All Hang Out", for Atlantic Records.

=== "Let It All Hang Out" ===
The musical backing for A.D.O.R.'s raps on "Let It All Hang Out" was by his old friend Pete Rock, by 1992 already an acclaimed producer, and now commonly cited as one of the hip hop genre's best. Stanton Swihart of allmusic describes the track as an "infectious" outing that was an "instant classic" on release, driven by Rock's "irresistible horn loop" and the "tight flow" of A.D.O.R.'s rhymes. A hit in the summer of 1992, for Swihart its qualities have now proved timeless. HipHopDX calls "Let It All Hang Out" "a certifiable Pete Rock classic", with "delicious horns" that no other producer could emulate. Though most critical commentary focuses on the production, the rapper's contribution is roundly praised; Steve Juon of RapReviews notes in particular that the record established A.D.O.R.'s distinctive, high-pitched register.

=== "One for the Trouble" and The Concrete ===
A.D.O.R. toured with major acts and made television appearances building on the buzz created by "Let It All Hang Out". In 1994, he followed up with a second single, "One for the Trouble", produced by K-Def and the legendary Queensbridge producer Marley Marl. This record provided the "back once again with the ill behaviour" vocal snippet which was sampled by Wildchild in "Renegade Master" and popularized in Fatboy Slim's 1998 hit remix. "One for the Trouble" signaled that plans were underway for a debut album on Atlantic titled The Concrete. Despite his successful run at the major label, A.D.O.R. was let go from his contract with Atlantic in 1995 without The Concrete being released, reportedly because of disputes over creative decisions, even though promotional items were released and the catalogue number 82443 was assigned to the release.

=== Tru Reign: Shock Frequency ===
A.D.O.R. formed his own record company in 1996: Tru Reign Records. For his fledgling label he immediately recorded and released as a single another Pete Rock track, "Enter the Center". It was a successful venture. Stanton reports that it sold "remarkably well" given its independent, small scale distribution, and received heavy radio play. He considers it the equal of its predecessor "Let It All Hang Out", but Juon goes further, offering that both Rock and Castellanos had improved their respective techniques in the six years between the two tracks. He draws attention to a new-found depth in the lyrical content of A.D.O.R.'s rap, putting this advancement down to maturity and experience in the later record. HipHopDX's reviewer found in "Enter the Center" "more of Pete Rock's understated brilliance". A.D.O.R.'s singles to date were collected on his debut album for Tru Reign, Shock Frequency (1998). Rock and Marley Marl were joined there by Diamond D and Clark Kent, making an impressive roster. "Shock to Bliss" and "Shock Frequency" were reminiscent of Rock's cuts, and almost as good, and Kent's contribution "From the Concrete" completed the album's highlights. The record as a whole betrayed its 1992 roots, though reviewers found this was not a bad thing, even if it did mean that it seemed to lack relevance or urgency in the musical climate of 1998.

=== Classic Bangerz, The Signature of the Ill, and beyond ===
In January 2000, Tru Reign secured a distribution deal with Nile Rodgers' company Sumpthing Distribution. By this time, A.D.O.R.'s roster at Tru Reign also included artists K The Terrorbull, Nappy Redd & Filthy Rich, and Cristal Lane. A.D.O.R. released the album Animal 2000 in this year. All was quiet until 2003, when he reemerged with the compilation Classic Bangers, Vol. 1, and then an album of new music, Signature of the Ill, in 2005. Both were received favorably by critics, yet the praise was again qualified as it had been with Shock Frequency's reception: the compilation of old material (which mined Shock Frequency heavily) and the collection of new music both seemed throwbacks to simpler times, with lyrics that concentrated on fun and a smooth flow rather than the trickery and internal or polysyllabic rhyme schemes of virtuoso rappers following in the wake of Biggie or Pun. A.D.O.R.'s Tru Jewelz and Videotape was released in 2008.

=== Death ===
A.D.O.R. died on 1 January 2025.

== Discography ==
- The Concrete (A.D.O.R. album) (Atlantic, 1994)
- Shock Frequency (Tru Reign, 1998)
- Animal 2000 (Tru Reign, 2000)
- Classic Bangerz, Vol. 1 (Tru Reign, 2003)
- Signature of the Ill (Tru Reign, 2005)
- Tru Jewelz and Videotape (Tru Reign, 2008)
- A D.O.R. 'Renegade ReMixes" ( Weapons Music 2023 EP )
- A.D.O.R. "Young World Mixes" ( Weapons Music EP 2023 )
- A.D.O.R. "Catch The Wave" ( Tru Reign Records Maxi-Single 2024 )
