= Angels, Burnley =

Nightclub and music venue in Burnley, England

Angels
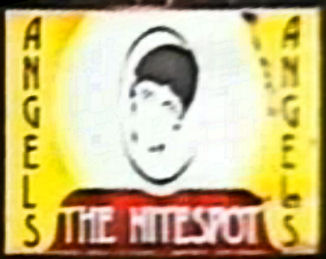
- The Angels Nightclub sign
- Interactive map of Angels
- Address: Curzon Street; Burnley, Lancashire; England
- Coordinates: 53.7905°N 2.2446°W
- Owner: Paul Taylor / Steve Farkas (at closure)

Construction
- Opened: 1974
- Closed: 1996
- Demolished: 1999

Angels was a nightclub and music venue in Burnley, Lancashire, England. It became most famous during the early 1990s with the rise of the house music scene, drawing visitors from across the United Kingdom. It occupied part of a multi-storey car park on Curzon St, currently the site of another car park and Primark and Next stores.

== History ==
June 1974 saw the official opening of Angels by TV's Pan's People and the Mayor of Burnley. In 1992 the first episode of the long-running late-night dance music show BPM featured footage from Angels with Dave Seaman DJing. Footage of the event can be found on YouTube.

Even at the height of its fame, Angels' days were numbered. Despite being just over 20 years old, the concrete framed multi-story car-park structure, of which the nightclub building was a part, had developed serious structural defects. The landowners Great Portland Estates and Burnley Council, decided that demolition and redevelopment of the area was the most economically viable solution. The last night at Angels was 27 April 1996. The original Angels nightclub building reopened briefly under the name 'Heaven' due to delays in demolishing the structure.

Faced with eviction, the club's owners decided to launch a new venue elsewhere in the town centre. Extensive work was undertaken to convert the former Aenon Baptist Chapel building into a multi-storey nightclub, which was intended to rival Liverpool’s Nation (the home of Cream). The club opened its doors in May 1996 as 'XPO'. This new venue proved to be unsuccessful, however, and receivers were appointed in February 1997.

== DJs ==
Carl Cox, Paul Oakenfold, Pete Tong, Sasha and Judge Jules all regularly DJ'd, and there were also appearances from Boy George and Nigel Benn. Anne Savage had her first UK residency at Angels, under her contemporary pseudonym 'DJ Fresh'.

DJ Paul Taylor also held a residency at the club, throughout the 1990s, and originated his "Retro" club night there.
