= Sunshine Hotel =

Flophouse in Manhattan, New York

Coordinates: 40°43′21.435″N 73°59′33.7842″W

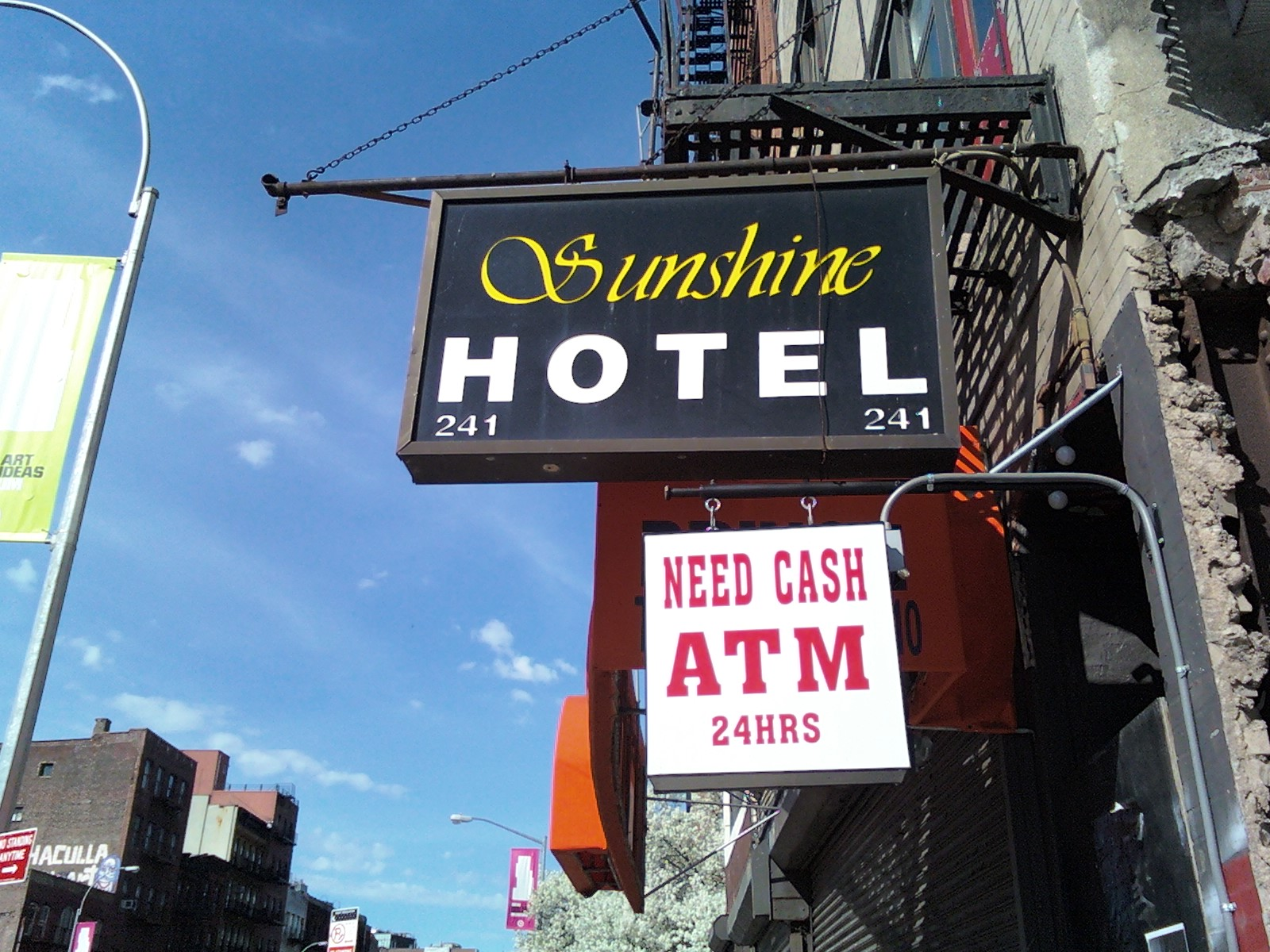
The Sunshine Hotel sign in 2010

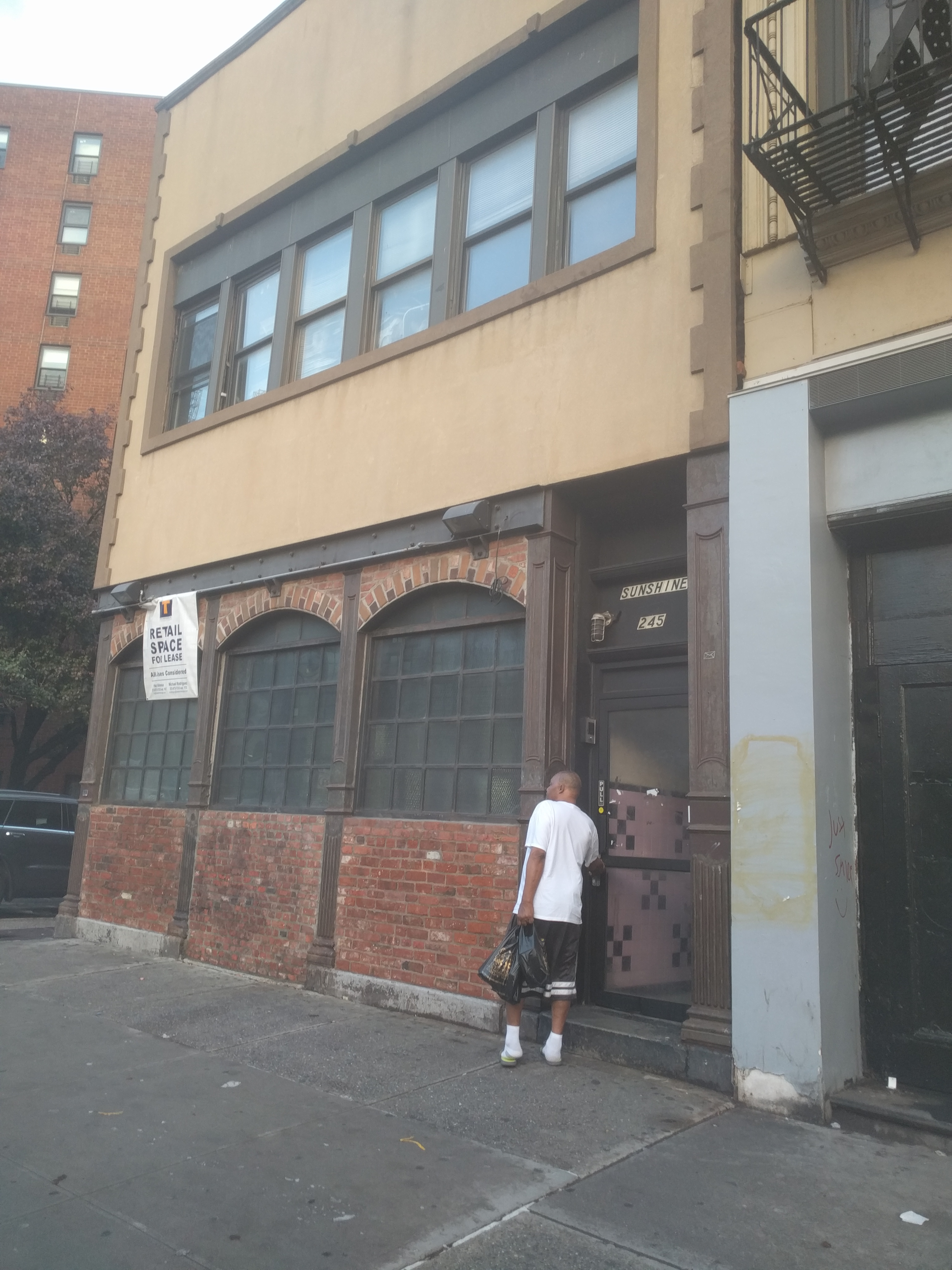
Bowery entrance in 2019

The Sunshine Hotel was a flophouse (single room occupancy hotel) at 245 Bowery in Manhattan, New York City. It received media attention in the late 1990s and early 2000s as a result of numerous radio and film documentaries about the hotel. The Sunshine Hotel has gradually been reduced in size with parts being converted into restaurant and office space.

== Description ==
Originally, the Sunshine Hotel occupied the internally connected upper floors of 241, 243 and 245 Bowery, labeled Sunshine, Lakewood and Annex respectively. The lobby was located on the second floor of 241 Bowery. The Lakewood had 45 cubicles, the Sunshine 100, and the Annex 36 with three barracks-like dormitories. The walkup is now at 245 Bowery.

Each cubicle is 4 ft × 6 ft (1.2 m × 1.8 m) on the sides and 7 ft (2.1 m) tall with a chicken-wire ceiling. The only amenities are a bed, a locker and a light-bulb.

When the hotel opened in the 1920s, guests could stay for 10 cents (equivalent to $1.92 in 2025) a night. By 1998, its rates were $10 a night. As of 2004, The Sunshine no longer accepted new occupants.

== History ==
241 Bowery was originally an office for the New York and Harlem Rail Company in the 1830s. In the late 1870s it was the location of the saloon and brothel Sultan Divin, and in 1910 the Fleabag saloon took over. By the early 1920s, the address was a pickle factory.

In 1922 Frank Mazzara, a broom-maker, followed his brother-in-law Mike Gatto of the Andrews Hotel, into the lodging business by purchasing the location and opening the Sunshine Hotel. Mazzara reworked the façade in the styles of Art Deco and Commercial. This façade had pale yellow bricks, limestone pediments and panels, and plaques with wreath and torch emblems.

Mazarra's son Carl took over the Sunshine Hotel in 1946. In 1949, the New York branch of the NAACP investigated Bowery hotels and found that the Sunshine Hotel was discriminating against black people by refusing them service. In 1970 James Adair, the hotel manager at the time, refused to sell cigarettes to a man and was then shot to death on the hotel's second floor. Carl retired in 1984 and sold the hotel to the Bari family, who were in the restaurant supply business, who used part of the hotel to store their business's pizza ovens.

By 1998, the Sunshine Hotel accommodated about 125 residents. The flophouse received attention after being featured in an NPR segment created by David Isay. In 2001 Michael Dominic released an award-winning documentary Sunshine Hotel. Both Isay's and Dominic's documentaries were narrated by the 16-year manager of the Sunshine Hotel, Nathan Smith, who died of cancer in 2002.

In August 2004 Anton Bari, the owner of the Sunshine Hotel, started buying out residents and refusing new guests. At this time, the flophouse had about 44 guests. By 2008, the Sunshine Hotel had fewer than 30 residents.

On June 30, 2008, the New York City Department of Housing Preservation and Development ruled that the hotel was harassing tenants to force them out. The city government gave the hotel three more years before developers could use the location.

The Sunshine Hotel lost its plywood signage in 2011 as workers converted the first floor of one of the hotel's three buildings into the Bowery Diner. In August 2014, Roseann Carone of Harlen Sales started converting the building's two upper floors into offices. Meanwhile, the 30 to 40 Sunshine Hotel residents stayed in neighboring 239 Bowery. In June 2017, Carone reapplied for a "Certificate of No Harassment" from the city in order to certify that the hotel was not harassing tenants, and move forward with development.

245's lower floor lay dormant from 2019 when Cara closed, up into 2022 when the Manhattan bar chain Veloce applied to expand into this space. During all these developments residents still lived upstairs in 245 despite 18 years without new admissions. Bar Veloce is a significant end to the Sunshine's story as it marks the building's transition from squalid flop house to style cocktail bar as the Bowery became gentrified in the first quarter of the 21st century.

== Media coverage and art ==
=== Film documentaries ===
==== 2001 feature documentary ====
Filmmaker Michael Dominic made the multi-award-winning and critically acclaimed feature documentary, Sunshine Hotel. Dominic worked on the Bowery and knew several residents of the flophouses. He became interested in making a documentary about the Sunshine and its residents. He began filming in 1999 and the completed film was released in 2001. Sunshine Hotel was his first documentary. It was released on Amazon Prime Video in 2012.

The film has received numerous nominations and awards at film festivals. It also had a two-year run on Sundance Channel

Andrea Chase praised the film's cinematography and structure, writing that the film "offers a unsparing look at what it means to hit bottom and stay there." Josh Ralke also gave the film a positive review, praising how it captures the lives of the hotel's residents.

==== 2000 student film ====
Phil Bertelsen created a 30-minute documentary student film titled The Sunshine in 2000 which follows some residents and workers for the Sunshine Hotel. It won awards for best short documentary at the 2000 Woodstock Film Festival and at the 2000 Shorts International Film Festival. Bertelsen was given the prize for "Best Black Student Filmmaker" at the 2002 DGA East Coast Student Film Awards for his work on this film.

=== Radio ===
David Isay and Stacy Abramson spent a year creating an All Things Considered segment on the Sunshine Hotel which aired on September 18, 1998. Isay edited 70 hours of raw tape to less than half an hour. Isay and Abramson then collaborated with photographer Harvey Wang to write a book about life in various Bowery flophouses, including the Sunshine Hotel.

The program won a Prix Italia award in 1999 under the factual documentary category. The documentary was included in an episode of the radio show 99% Invisible which aired on August 4, 2015.

Miles Maguire compared the documentary's narrative to Dante's Inferno, where the hotel manager Nathan Smith takes the role of Virgil as tour guide and narrator; and the guests represent various personality disorders.

=== Art ===
Around July 2004, the artist Julianne Swartz created an art installation titled "Can You Hear Me?" that used a yellow PVC tube to connect the second floor of the Sunshine Hotel to a platform on the sidewalk. The tube had mirrors which pedestrians could look through and interact with Sunshine Hotel residents. This project was part of an exhibition designed to explore the diversity of the Bowery and was done in anticipation of the future opening of the New Museum. Sunshine Hotel residents had mixed feelings regarding the project; some enjoyed the interactions with outsiders while others were uninterested.

On August 19, 2016, the Philadelphia songwriters Sam Cook-Parrott and Michael Cantor released the album The Afterglows with the third track titled "Angels In The Sunshine Hotel". This song was inspired by the story of a man who moved to New York to study philosophy, but ultimately went broke and became a Sunshine Hotel tenant.
