= Wrap Me Up (Alex Party song) =

1995 single by Alex Party

Single by Alex Party

from the album Alex Party
- Released: 8 September 1995
- Genre: Eurodance
- Length: 3:49
- Label: UMM
- Songwriters: Paolo Visnadi; Alex Natale; Robin 'Shanie' Campbell
- Producers: Visnadi; Alex Natale

Alex Party singles chronology
"Don't Give Me Your Life" (1995)	"Wrap Me Up" (1995)	"Read My Lips" (1996)

Music video
- "Wrap Me Up" on YouTube

"Wrap Me Up" is a song by Italian dance music act Alex Party with vocals by British singer Robin 'Shanie' Campbell, who also co-wrote the lyrics. It was released in September 1995, by label UMM, as the third single from their debut and only album, Alex Party (1996), and became a top-20 hit in both the United Kingdom and Australia. The single also peaked at number one in Italy, number six in Spain and number 15 in Finland. The accompanying music video first aired in October 1995.

== Critical reception ==
Upon the release, pan-European magazine Music & Media wrote, "In the wake of 'Don't Give Me Your Life', which was a pan-European success earlier this year, the Visnadi brothers haven't changed their winning team but have instead paired up with singer Shanie for what is likely to be their next Euro-dance hit." Alan Jones from Music Week commented, "It's taken Alex Party eight months to come up with a follow-up to their number two hit [...] and though 'Wrap Me Up' has the same jaunty style with stomping beat supported by keyboard riffing, it hasn't got quite the same commercial edge. It is, however, a highly serviceable dance record, well put together and an obvious, if smaller, hit than its predecessor." James Hamilton from the Record Mirror Dance Update deemed it a "chanting girl nagged Italian smash".

== Chart performance ==
"Wrap Me Up" debuted at number 44 on the Australian ARIA Singles Chart on 11 February 1996—it later peaked at number 11 on 12 May 1996 and spent a total of 22 weeks on the chart, earning a gold certification from the Australian Recording Industry Association (ARIA). In the United Kingdom, the single peaked at number 17 on the UK Singles Chart on 12 November 1995 and spent six weeks within the UK Top 100. In Ireland, it became a top-30 hit, peaking at number 30. It was successful in Alex Party's native Italy, rising to number one on the Musica e dischi singles chart, and in Spain, where it peaked at number six. On the Eurochart Hot 100, "Wrap Me Up" reached number 39 on 25 November 1995, after charting in Austria, Denmark, Spain, Sweden and the UK. In West Asia, the song became a top-30 hit in Israel, peaking at number 23 on 21 November 1995.

== Track listings ==
- CD single – Australia (1995)
1. "Wrap Me Up" (Radio Edit) – 3:58
2. "Wrap Me Up" (Dancing Divaz Club Edit) – 4:50
3. "Wrap Me Up" (Light Piano Mix) – 5:31
4. "Wrap Me Up" (FMS Edit) – 6:28
5. "Wrap Me Up" (Original Version) – 5:23
6. "Wrap Me Up" (LWS On A Mission) – 4:37
- CD single – United Kingdom (1995)
1. "Wrap Me Up" (Radio Edit) – 3:49
2. "Wrap Me Up" (Dancing Divaz Club Edit) – 4:50
3. "Wrap Me Up" (FMS Edit) – 6:29
4. "Don't Give Me Your Life" (LWS Instrumental Bitch Mix) – 5:04

== Charts ==
=== Weekly charts ===
Weekly chart performance for "Wrap Me Up"
Chart (1995–1996)	Peak position
Australia (ARIA)	11
Austria (Ö3 Austria Top 40)	38
Canada Dance/Urban (RPM)	6
Europe (Eurochart Hot 100)	39
Europe (European Dance Radio)	12
Finland (Suomen virallinen lista)	15
Germany (GfK)	63
Ireland (IRMA)	30
Israel (Israeli Singles Chart)	23
Italy (Musica e dischi)	1
Netherlands (Dutch Top 40 Tipparade)	4
Netherlands (Single Top 100 Tipparade)	5
Scottish Singles Sales (Official Charts)	20
Spain (AFYVE)	6
Sweden (Sverigetopplistan)	31
UK Singles (Official Charts)	17
UK Dance (Official Charts)	8

=== Year-end charts ===
1995 year-end chart performance for "Wrap Me Up"
Chart (1995)	Position
UK Pop Tip Club Chart (Music Week)	37

1996 year-end chart performance for "Wrap Me Up"
Chart (1996)	Position
Australia (ARIA)	48

== Certifications ==
Certifications for "Wrap Me Up"
Region	Certification	Certified units/sales
Australia (ARIA)	Gold	35,000^{^}
^{^} Shipments figures based on certification alone.
