= Sex on the Streets =

1995 song by Pizzaman

Single by Pizzaman

from the album Pizzamania
- Released: 1995
- Genre: Eurodance; house
- Length: 3:48
- Label: Cowboy; Loaded
- Songwriter: Pizzaman
- Producer: Pizzaman

Pizzaman singles chronology
"Trippin' on Sunshine" (1994)	"Sex on the Streets" (1995)	"Happiness" (1995)

Music video
- "Sex on the Streets" on YouTube

"Sex on the Streets" is a song by British electronic music duo Pizzaman, consisting of John Reid and Norman Cook, and was released in 1995, by Cowboy and Loaded Records, as the second single from their only album, Pizzamania (1995). The song samples a part of a 1974 sermon by American evangelist Jack van Impe and peaked at number-one on both the UK Dance Singles Chart and the UK Club Chart. The accompanying music video was directed by American filmmaker and photojournalist Michael Dominic. In 2011, the song was released in the Netherlands in a new mix as "Sex on the Streets 2011".

== Critical reception ==
In his weekly UK chart commentary, James Masterton wrote, "Yet another dance record, this one at least standing out owing to its use of spoken sections as a hook. It is summery and commercial enough to be more of a hit than this but the prospects look fairly bleak." Daisy & Havoc from Music Week's RM Dance Update gave the song a score of four out of five, adding, "Is there a buzz about it? Oh yes, and you'd expect there to be after the stupendous 'Trippin' on Sunshine'? But is it any good? Erm...well it's loads better than most other records flying around at the moment. It's full of excitement, sexual references, anti-establishment feelings, enormous never-fail party pianos, big breaks – it's full of everything and will be very successful on the nation's dancefloors and will appear on lots of mix CDs by popular party DJs." Another editor, James Hamilton, described it as "Norman Cook's terrific rattling and whistling percussive Latin-type leaper".

== Impact and legacy ==
Tomorrowland included "Sex on the Streets" in their official list of "The Ibiza 500" in 2020.

== Track listing ==
- 12", UK (1995)
1. "Sex on the Streets" (Pizzaman Club)
2. "Sex on the Streets" (Pizzaman Dub)
3. "Sex on the Streets" (Play Boys Fully Loaded Dub)
- 12", Netherlands (2011)
1. "Sex on the Streets" — 7:20
2. "Sex on the Streets" — 5:39
3. "Sex on the Streets" — 5:58
- CD single, UK (1995)
1. "Sex on the Streets" (Radio Edit) — 3:48
2. "Sex on the Streets" (Pizzaman Club) — 6:44
3. "Sex on the Streets" (Pizzaman Dub) — 7:32
4. "Sex on the Streets" (Play Boys Fully Loaded Dub) — 9:03
- CD maxi, Germany (1995)
1. "Sex on the Streets" (Pizzaman Club Mix) — 6:44
2. "Sex on the Streets" (Pizzaman Dub) — 7:32
3. "Sex on the Streets" (Play Boys Fully Loaded Dub) — 9:03

== Charts ==
=== Weekly charts ===
Chart (1995)	Peak position
Australia (ARIA)	207
Belgium (Ultratop 50 Flanders)	38
Canada Dance/Urban (RPM)	5
Europe (Eurochart Hot 100)	74
Europe (European Dance Radio)	25
Finland (IFPI)	13
Germany (GfK)	36
Netherlands (Dutch Top 40)	24
Netherlands (Single Top 100)	20
Scotland (OCC)	27
UK Singles (OCC)	23
UK Dance (OCC)	1
UK Club Chart (Music Week)	1
UK Pop Tip Club Chart (Music Week)	26
UK Indie (Music Week)	1

Chart (1996)	Peak position
Scotland (OCC)	33
UK Singles (OCC)	23
UK Dance (OCC)	1
UK Club Chart (Music Week	1

=== Year-end charts ===
Chart (1995)	Position
UK Club Chart (Music Week)	17
