= Caught in the Middle (Juliet Roberts song) =

1993 single by Juliet Roberts

Single by Juliet Roberts

from the album Natural Thing
- Released: 19 July 1993
- Genre: Dance; garage house; gospel
- Length: 3:31 (1993 Gospel Revival edit); 3:21 (1994 Def Classic radio mix)
- Label: Cooltempo; Slam Jam
- Songwriters: Danny Poku; Juliet Roberts
- Producer: Danny Poku

Juliet Roberts singles chronology
"Another Place Another Day Another Time" (1992)	"Caught in the Middle" (1993)	"I Want You" (1994)

Music video
- "Caught in the Middle" on YouTube

"Caught in the Middle" is a song by British singer-songwriter Juliet Roberts, originally released in July 1993, by Cooltempo Records and Slam Jam. In June 1994, the song was re-released as a remix and became a club hit. Written by Roberts with Danny Poku, who also produced the song, it was well received among music critics, reaching number-one on both the US Billboard Hot Dance Club Play chart and the UK Music Week Dance Singles chart, where it peaked atop both in 1993 and 1994. Additionally, the single peaked at number 14 in the UK, and number 31 in Scotland, while on the Eurochart Hot 100, it reached number 43. "Caught in the Middle" was included on her debut album, Natural Thing (1994), and it won the Record Mirror Club Cut of the Year honour at the 1994 Music Week Awards.

== Critical reception ==
"1993 was a very positive and productive year. It was nlce to get some records out and for them to be successful. There's now room for growth — or else to fall flat on my face! The most interesting thing was all the remixes of my singles. It's quite exciting that someone can offer a totally different interpretation of your muslc, and when they're done well — as mine were — It's a lot of fun. I certainly got my rocks off on them!"

—Juliet Roberts talking to Music Week about the song.

=== 1993 version ===
Andy Beevers from Music Week rated 'Caught in the Middle' four out of five and named it Pick of the Week in the category of Dance, calling it a "superb single by one of the UK's foremost soul singers" that "is shaping up to be a big seller." In the Record Mirror Dance Update, he wrote, "This extremely special song, which was originally due out on Warners, finally sees the light of day a year later on Cooltempo. The title ended up being very prophetic for Juliet Roberts, and the 'How Long?' refrain was exactly the question being asked by the nation's DJs and punters. Now the track is here for all to enjoy in its Danny D-produced and Roger S-mixed glory. Sanchez's smooth but slamming remixes with their acapella and heartbeat breakdowns and dubwise outras are pure magic. What a voice! What a song!" It was also named a "classy garage anthem". James Hamilton, described it as "gospelish garage" in his Record Mirror dance column.

=== 1994 version ===
Upon the 1994 re-release, Larry Flick from Billboard magazine wrote, "Hot on the heels of the red-hot 'I Want You' come fresh new David Morales remixes of a sparkling gem that has already stormed dancefloors throughout the U.K. and Europe. The power of the chorus is undeniably strong, and Roberts cuts loose a high-velocity performance that proves her star power. Once this one reaches the top of club charts (and you can bet top dollar that it will), watch this delightful single work every last programmer's nerve at top 40 radio. From the fab debut album Natural Thing." Pan-European magazine Music & Media commented, "Don't confuse this lady with the actress who recently married Lyle Lovett. This Roberts is caught in the act singing on Dina Carroll and Lisa Stansfield territory. Those nightingales should get worried, because the competition is getting tighter."

Andy Beevers for Record Mirror said, "When you've got to improve on near perfection, then there is only one person to call. Yep, that man Morales. He has taken this tune and created an epic remix that manages to surpass the ones which took it to the top of the 1993 end-of-year RM Club Chart. The classic Def Mix provides added bounce with its brash pianos. firing brass and wonderful techno-ish outro. It also boasts more serious breakdowns than an Allegro that's been round the clock a couple of times." He stated that 'Caught in the Middle' "is poised to be an even bigger hit this time around." Neil Spencer from The Observer felt it "set her powerhouse vocals with equally muscular beats." Emma Cochrane from Smash Hits wrote, "It's already number one in all the dance charts and Juliet Roberts has the perfect voice for this kind of upbeat, classic dance track."

== Track listings ==
- 12-inch, UK (1993)
1. "Caught in the Middle" (Gospel Revival Mix)
2. "Caught in the Middle" (Monster Club Mix)
3. "Caught in the Middle" (Heartbeat Mix)
4. "Caught in the Middle" (Fire Island Mix)
- CD single, UK (1993)
1. "Caught in the Middle" (Gospel Revival Edit) — 3:31
2. "Caught in the Middle" (Hip Hop Edit) — 4:06
3. "Caught in the Middle" (Monster Club Mix) — 5:57
4. "Caught in the Middle" (Fire Island Mix) — 6:28
5. "Caught in the Middle" (Gospel Revival Mix) — 9:00
6. "Caught in the Middle" (Roach Motel Mix) — 8:04
- CD single (94' Remixes), UK (1994)
1. "Caught in the Middle" (Def Classic Radio Mix) — 3:21
2. "Caught in the Middle" (Gospel Revival Edit) — 3:31
3. "Caught in the Middle" (Def Classic 12" Mix) — 8:54
4. "Stop for Love" — 4:11
- CD maxi, US (1994)
1. "Caught in the Middle" (Album Edit) — 3:59
2. "Caught in the Middle" (Def Classic Radio) — 3:48
3. "Caught in the Middle" (Monster Club Mix) — 5:55
4. "Caught in the Middle" (Def Classic Mix) — 9:27
5. "Caught in the Middle" (Roger S. Gospel Revival Mix) — 5:48
6. "Caught in the Middle" (Oscar G. Radio Mix) — 5:09

== Charts ==
=== Weekly charts ===
Chart (1993)	Peak position
Europe (Eurochart Hot 100)	92
Europe (European Dance Radio)	13
UK Singles (OCC)	24
UK Airplay (Music Week)	18
UK Dance (Music Week)	1
UK Club Chart (Music Week)	1
US Hot Dance Club Play (Billboard)	27

Chart (1994)	Peak position
Europe (Eurochart Hot 100)	43
Scotland (OCC)	31
UK Singles (OCC)	14
UK Dance (OCC)	4
UK Airplay (Music Week)	11
UK Dance (Music Week)	1
UK Club Chart (Music Week)	1
US Hot Dance Club Play (Billboard)	1
US Maxi-Singles Sales (Billboard)	34

=== Year-end charts ===
Chart (1993)	Position
UK Club Chart (Music Week)	1

Chart (1994)	Position
UK Club Chart (Music Week)	16
US Dance Club Play (Billboard)	35

== Release history ==
Region	Date	Format(s)	Label(s)	Ref.
United Kingdom	19 July 1993	12-inch vinyl; CD; cassette	Cooltempo; Slam Jam	
Australia	20 September 1993	CD; cassette	Cooltempo; Slam Jam	
United Kingdom (re-release)	20 June 1994	12-inch vinyl; CD; cassette	Cooltempo; Slam Jam	
