= Read My Lips (Alex Party song) =

Single by Alex Party

from the album Alex Party
- B-side: "Remix"
- Released: 1994; October 7, 1996
- Genre: Eurodance; Italo house
- Length: 3:42 (1994); 4:10 (1996)
- Label: Systematic
- Songwriters: Paolo Visnadi; Alex Natale; Shanie Campbell
- Producers: Visnadi; Alex Natale

Alex Party singles chronology
"Wrap Me Up" (1995)	"Read My Lips" (1994)	"Simple Things" (1997)

Music video
- "Read My Lips" on YouTube

"Read My Lips" is a song recorded by Italian dance music act Alex Party. It was first released as "Read My Lips/Saturday Night Party" on 18 December 1993, where it entered at number 49 in the UK Singles Chart. It remained in the top 100 for 6 weeks before it was re-released on 28 May 1994. This time "Read My Lips" peaked at number 29. It spent 5 weeks in the top 100.

In 1996, the song was released with vocals by singer 'Shanie' Campbell. This version peaked at number 28 on the UK Singles Chart, number 15 on the UK Dance Chart and number 32 in Scotland. On the Eurochart Hot 100, it reached 52. Outside Europe the '96 version peaked at number 51 in Australia.

== Critical reception ==
On the 1993 release as "Saturday Night Party", Andy Beevers from Music Week stated, "It kicks off in fine style with an irrepressibly upbeat house track gleaned from the Italian UMM label." James Hamilton from the Record Mirror Dance Update described it as a "tonight it's party time and read my lips prodded, synth stabbed jauntily plinking Italo leaper". On the 1996 version, Pan-European magazine Music & Media wrote, "Some of those catchy Italo tunes are just irresistible. After one play you can't get them out of your head and this is definitely one. Originally made by Italian producers, and now remixed by the Dutch BT&T-production-team, this single contains two excellent radio edits."

== Track listing ==
- CD single, UK (1994)
1. "Read My Lips" (Camp Fridge Party) – 2:55
2. "Read My Lips" (Saturday Night Party) – 3:42
3. "Read My Lips" (Sunday Afternoon Party) – 4:48
4. "Read My Lips" (Rhyme Time Party) – 7:15
- CD single, UK (1996)
1. "Read My Lips" (Radio Edit) – 4:10
2. "Read My Lips" (Camp Fridge Party) – 2:55
3. "Read My Lips" (Sunday Night Party) – 4:57
4. "Read My Lips" (Ken's Snoop Doggy Doh Mix) – 7:28
5. "Read My Lips" (Extended Classic) – 5:04

== Charts ==
Chart (1993)	Peak position
UK Singles (OCC)	49
UK Dance (Music Week)	1
UK Club Chart (Music Week)	7

Chart (1994)	Peak position
Europe (Eurochart Hot 100)	90
UK Singles (OCC)	29
UK Dance (Music Week)	4

Chart (1996)	Peak position
Australia (ARIA)	51
Europe (Eurochart Hot 100)	52
Netherlands (Dutch Single Tip)	10
Scotland (OCC)	32
UK Singles (OCC)	28
UK Dance (OCC)	15
UK Pop Tip Club Chart (Music Week)	11
