= That Secret Place =

Studio album by Patti Austin
- Released: May 10, 1994
- Studios: Starlight Studios (Malibu, California); Sunset Sound (Hollywood, California)
- Genre: Jazz
- Length: 47:23
- Label: GRP
- Producer: Lee Ritenour

Patti Austin chronology
Carry On (1991)	That Secret Place (1994)	Jukebox Dreams (1996)

That Secret Place is the tenth album by Patti Austin, released May 10, 1994.

== Critical reception ==
Professional ratings
Review scores
Source	Rating
AllMusic	3/5 stars
Charlotte Observer	4/4 stars
Tampa Bay Times	3/5 stars

Jonathan Widran of AllMusic in a 3/5-star review called the album, "her most musically diverse, covering an ambitious range of material...(That Secret Place) gives her the chance to highlight her skills as a vocal stylist and interpreter with few peers...Austin can do it all herself, but she enjoys the camaraderie she shares on various cuts with Vesta, Mervyn Warren, Tata Vega, and Phil Perry."

The Charlotte Observer, in a 4/4-star review, exclaimed on That Secret Place, "Austin - backed by some of the best folks in the business, such as Vesta, Gerald Albright, Paulhino Da Costa, Bob James and Phil Perry - does drop-dead work...She covers a wide range of styles: reggae, a drop of hip-hop, jazz, pop, R&B, fusion. And what makes this CD so great is that she pulls off each style with equal aplomb."

Phyllis Bailey of the Tampa Bay Times favourably found, "Patti Austin has a voice that fits anywhere. Ask any composer, producer or arranger who has worked with her. Ask Quincy Jones. On this album, ask Lee Ritenour, Dave Grusin or Bob James. Ask Aretha Franklin, whom she pays tribute to with an earthy rendering of Rock Steady that's similar to the Queen of Soul's hit. Ask El DeBarge, whose duet with her, Broken Dreams, sounds more like him than her. Her style melds with whoever is giving direction...(on this) nice album."

== Chart performance ==
That Secret Place peaked at number 12 on June 24, 1994, and spent 23 weeks on the Billboard Contemporary Jazz Albums chart.

"Reach" was released as a single from the album. The song peaked at number 4 in November 1994, spending 13 weeks on the Billboard Dance/Club Play chart. It also peaked at number 24 on the Billboard Dance Singles Sales chart.

== Track listing ==
No.	Title	Writer(s)	Length
1.	"That's Enough for Me"	Dave Grusin; Patti Austin	5:19
2.	"Ability to Swing"	Matthew Seligman; Thomas Dolby	4:48
3.	"Somebody Make Me Laugh"	Bette Sussman; Terry Cox	4:25
4.	"Broken Dreams"	Darell DeBarge; El DeBarge; Tony A. Redic	4:39
5.	"Rock Steady"	Aretha Franklin	4:41
6.	"Captivated"	John McKenzie; Maggie Ryder	4:38
7.	"Hurry Home"	Andy Marvel; Nina Ossoff	4:50
8.	"That Secret Place"	Lee Ritenour; Lorraine Feather; Patti Austin; Phil Perry	5:10
9.	"Reach"	Jim Dyke; Nina Ossoff	4:28
10.	"Stars in Your Eyes"	Chris Eaton; Rob Marshall	4:25
Total length:			47:23

== Personnel ==
Musicians and vocals

- Patti Austin – lead vocals, backing vocals (1–4, 6, 8)
- Bob James – acoustic piano (1, 2, 8, 10), acoustic piano solo (1), synthesizers (1, 10), keyboards (2, 8)
- Randy Kerber – additional synthesizers (1, 3, 4, 6–8), synth solo (1)
- Barnaby Finch – keyboard bass (2)
- Greg Phillinganes – synthesizers (3, 5, 6), acoustic piano (3, 7), keyboards (4, 7), keyboard solo (4)
- David Witham – synthesizers (3, 4, 6, 9), Hammond B3 organ (3, 5, 6, 9)
- Lee Ritenour – guitars (1–9), guitar synthesizer solo (9)
- Melvin Davis – bass (1–9)
- Steve Ferrone – drums (1–9)
- Paulinho da Costa – percussion (1, 2, 4–9)
- Dan Higgins – alto saxophone, tenor saxophone
- Gerald Albright – tenor saxophone (7)
- Steve Tavaglione – EWI trumpet solo (8)
- Bill Reichenbach Jr. – trombone
- Gary Grant – trumpet
- Jerry Hey – trumpet, flugelhorn
- Lani Groves – backing vocals (1–4, 6)
- Phil Perry – backing vocals (2, 3, 5, 9)
- Mervyn Warren – backing vocals (2)
- El DeBarge – lead and backing vocals (4)
- Tata Vega – backing vocals (5, 9)
- Vesta Williams – backing vocals (5, 9)
- Perri – backing vocals (7)

Music arrangements

- Patti Austin – vocal arrangements (1, 3, 4, 6–9), BGV arrangements (2)
- Bob James – rhythm arrangements (1), horn arrangements (2), song arrangements (10)
- Jerry Hey – flute arrangements (1), horn arrangements (1–9), string arrangements (1, 3, 4, 6–8)
- Lee Ritenour – rhythm arrangements (1–4, 6–9), synthesizer arrangements (9)
- Mervyn Warren – BGV arrangements (2)
- Greg Phillinganes – rhythm arrangements (3, 4, 7)
- El DeBarge – vocal arrangements (4)
- Aretha Franklin – vocal arrangements (5)
- Phil Perry – vocal arrangements (5)
- Johnny Mandel – flute, horn and string arrangements (10)

=== Production ===
- Dave Grusin and Larry Rosen – executive producers
- Lee Ritenour – producer
- Don Murray – recording, mixing
- Mike Kloster – additional engineer, second engineer, technical assistant
- Robert Vosgien – digital editing at CMS Digital (Pasadena, California)
- Wally Traugott – mastering at Capitol Studios (Hollywood, California)
- Joseph Doughney and Michael Landy – post-production at The Review Room (New York City, New York)
- Michael Pollard – GRP production coordinator
- Sonny Mediana – GRP production director
- Sharon Franklin – production direction assistant
- Andy Baltimore – GRP creative director
- Hollis King and Dan Serrano – art direction
- Alba Acevedo, Laurie Goldman and Freddie Paloma – graphic design
- Carol Friedman – photography
- Debbie Horgan – hair stylist
- Craig Gadson – make-up
- Ted Muehling – jewelry
- Barry Orms – management

Track information and credits were adapted from the album's liner notes and AllMusic.
