= Funk Masters =

British band

- Origin: London, England
- Genres: Reggae, funk
- Years active: 1979–1988
- Labels: Master Funk Records, Tania Music
- Past members: Emmett North Jr. Rose Patterson; Julie Roberts; Tony Williams

Funk Masters was a British reggae-funk band. Its single "It's Over" peaked at number eight on the UK Singles Chart in 1983. The band was formed by DJ Tony Williams (who was a reggae presenter on BBC Radio London) in 1979 and was his very first project.

== History ==
The band's debut single was an instrumental "Love Money", released in 1980, as the B-side to "(Money) No Love" credited to Bo Kool, which is seen as one of the first UK rap songs, if not the first. Both songs were written, arranged and produced by Williams. Williams was working in a club on Carnaby Street, London and would "kind of rap" with friend Bo Kool to the Sugarhill Gang's "Rapper's Delight", which had recently been released. He suggested going to a studio and recording it. "Money In My Pocket" by Dennis Brown was popular at the time and Kool decided to write some lyrics based around it. The track was then recorded at Hillside Studio in London. The song also got some traction on the US dance scene.

The band's only chart success was the more soul song "It's Over", released in June 1983. The vocals are uncredited and are by Juliet Roberts (then performing as Julie Roberts) and the song also includes horns by Gonzalez.

== Discography ==
=== Singles ===
Year	A-side	B-side	Peaks
Year	A-side	B-side	UK
1980	"(Money) No Love" (by Bo Kool)	"Love Money"	—
1981	"You Can't Make Me Cry (Anymore)"	"Cry"	—
1982	"Space Invaders" (by Bo Kool)	"Invaders"	—
1982	"Bad Boys" (by Bouw Kool)	"Bad Boys" (Instrumental)	—
1983	"Caveman Rock" (by Junior Gee)	"Scratch the Rock"	—
1983	"It's Over"	"Over" (Instrumental)	8
1983	"Merry Christmas/Happy New Year" (by Bouw Kool)	"Instrumental" / "The Scratch"	—
1984	"Have You Got the Time"	"Have You Got the Time" (Disco Mix)	—
1986	"Love Money" ('86)	"Fort Knox"	—
1986	"The Truth" (Rap) (by Junior Gee)	"The Truth" (Instrumental)	—
1988	"Shake Your Body Down" / "Rap Your Body Down"	"Instrumental Shake Down" / "Mix Your Body Down"	—
"—" denotes releases that did not chart.
