= Rachel McFarlane =

British singer

- Origin: Manchester, England
- Genres: House
- Years active: 1992–present
- Labels: All Around the World
- Website: MySpace page

Rachel McFarlane is a British singer. She began singing at the age of twelve as a gospel singer.

In 1992, her career began as a featured member of the dancehall/rave act The Family Foundation, which recorded the single "Express Yourself". After the act disbanded, McFarlane joined the house music group Loveland (with Mark Hadfield, Paul Taylor and Paul Waterman) in 1994. She was featured on their track "Let the Music (Lift You Up)" which reached number 16 in the UK Singles Chart. The same year, she recorded "Turn Up the Power" with N-Trance.

In 1998, she released her debut single "Lover" which made the Top 40 in the UK Singles Chart. "Lover" was also released in 2005 through the All Around the World label, once again making it to the Top 40.

In 2004, she joined LMC to record the vocals for their track "Take Me to the Clouds Above" which peaked at number one in the UK chart. Two years later, she also recorded "You Get What You Give" with the group.

She appeared as Justice/Mother in the London production of Rock of Ages.

== Singles discography ==
| Year | Title | Artist | UK Chart Position |
|---|---|---|---|
| 1994 | "(Keep On) Shining" / "Hope (Never Give Up)" | Loveland | #37 |
| 1994 | "Let the Music (Lift You Up)" | Loveland | #16 |
| 1994 | "Turn Up the Power" | N-Trance | #23 |
| 1995 | "I Need Somebody" | Loveland | #21 |
| 1995 | "Don't Make Me Wait" | Loveland | #22 |
| 1995 | "The Wonder of Love" | Loveland | #53 |
| 1997 | "Lift Me Up" | Gems for Jem | |
| 1998 | "Lover" | Rachel McFarlane | #38 |
| 2004 | "Take Me to the Clouds Above" | LMC | #1 |
| 2005 | "Lover" (re-recording) | Rachel McFarlane | #36 |
| 2006 | "You Get What You Give" | LMC | #30 |
| 2009 | "Don't Stop Me Now" | Side Effect | |
