= Renegade Master =

1995 single by Wildchild

Single by Wildchild
- Released: 9 October 1995
- Genre: House
- Length: 4:00 (radio edit); 7:42 (original mix)
- Label: Hi-Life
- Songwriter: Wildchild
- Producer: Wildchild

Wildchild singles chronology
"Legends of the Dark Black Pt 2" (1995)	"Renegade Master" (1995)	"Jump to My Beat" (1996)

"Renegade Master" is a song by English DJ/producer Wildchild, released as a single in October 1995 by Hi-Life Recordings. It reached No. 11 on the UK Singles Chart. The previous single, "Legends of the Dark Black Pt 2 (Renegade Master Mix)" is the same as "Renegade Master", just with a different title, which reached No. 34. It samples vocals from A.D.O.R.'s "One for the Trouble". "Renegade Master" was remixed by Fatboy Slim in 1997 and reached No. 3 in the UK, becoming the most successful version of the song.

== Critical reception ==
British magazine Music Week gave the 1995 version of the song four out of five, adding, "Wildchild's passion for classic electro and hip hop has been put to good use, jumbling Public Enemy-influenced repetitive sounds and fresh house beats." In 1997, they gave the '98 remix five out of five, writing that "Norman Cook's infectious mix—along with house and breakbeat mixes from Stretch & Vern and Urban Takeover—should bring it even greater chart success this time around." Andrew Diprose from Smash Hits gave the original version three out of five, saying, "A memorable—if repetitive—drum-and-bass rap/house track that has been huge club-wise for the past year and will now be a big chart hit. Pretty good, but the sort of record you'll get fed-up of after three listens."

== Track listing ==
No.	Title	Length
1.	"Renegade Master" (original radio edit)	4:03
2.	"Renegade Master" (original mix)	7:42
3.	"Renegade Master" (Tall Paul mix)	9:01
4.	"Renegade Master" (Young & Dangerous mix)	10:55
5.	"Renegade Master" (New Blood mix)	4:57

== Charts ==
Chart (1995)	Peak position
Europe (Eurochart Hot 100)	22
Scotland Singles (Official Charts)	25
UK Singles (Official Charts)	11
UK Dance (Official Charts)	2

== "Renegade Master '98" ==
"Renegade Master '98"

Single by Wildchild
- Released: 5 January 1998
- Genre: Big beat
- Length: 3:52 (edit)
- Label: Hi-Life
- Songwriter: Wildchild
- Producer: Wildchild

Wildchild singles chronology
"Jump to My Beat" (1996)	"Renegade Master '98" (1998)	"Bad Boy" (1998)

"Renegade Master" was remixed by Fatboy Slim, titled "Renegade Master '98". It was released as a single on 5 January 1998 and surpassed the original's chart position, peaking at No. 3 on the UK Singles Chart as well as No. 1 on the UK Dance Singles Chart.

=== Charts ===
==== Weekly charts ====
Chart (1998)	Peak position
Belgium (Ultratip Bubbling Under Flanders)	13
Europe (Eurochart Hot 100)	21
Finland (Suomen virallinen lista)	6
Germany (GfK)	88
Iceland (Íslenski Listinn Topp 40)	3
Ireland (IRMA)	10
Netherlands (Single Top 100)	58
New Zealand (Recorded Music NZ)	11
Norway (VG-lista)	15
Scotland Singles (Official Charts)	7
Sweden (Sverigetopplistan)	35
UK Singles (Official Charts)	3
UK Dance (Official Charts)	1

==== Year-end charts ====
Chart (1998)	Position
UK Singles (OCC)	83

=== Certifications ===
Region	Certification	Certified units/sales
United Kingdom (BPI)	Gold	400,000^{‡}
^{‡} Sales+streaming figures based on certification alone.

== In popular culture ==
Wildchild's "Renegade Master" was used as a theme tune of the Finnish comedy series Ranuan kummit, written and directed by Jani Volanen in 2003. Every episode of the 12-part series began with the four characters running as fast as they can as "Renegade Master" gives them oumph, until they one by one run out of breath and are halted by exhaustion. The series won the Venla Award for Best Comedy Series of 2003.
