= Loveland (band) =

Loveland were an English house music group, formed in 1994 by Mark Hadfield, Paul Taylor and Paul Waterman.

The group scored several dance hits in the UK in the mid-1990s, and released one album, 1995's The Wonder of Love. Rachel McFarlane was the group's 'featured' lead vocalist, and was often co-credited on their releases (as Loveland featuring Rachel McFarlane). All three of the other members did extensive work as remixers for many major artists including the likes of Kylie Minogue, Donna Summer, C+C Music Factory, Culture Beat and many more. They also run the Eastern Bloc record label which they released their records on.

== Charting singles ==
List of singles, with selected chart positions
Title	Year	Chart positions		
Title	Year	UK	AUS	U.S. Dance
"Let the Music (Lift You Up)"	1994	16	162	19
"(Keep On) Shining/Hope (Never Give Up)"	1994	37	—	—
"I Need Somebody"	1995	21	—	—
"Don't Make Me Wait"	1995	22	163	—
"The Wonder of Love"	1995	53	—	—
"I Need Somebody" (remix)	1995	38	—	—
