= Juliet Roberts =

British singer (born 1962)

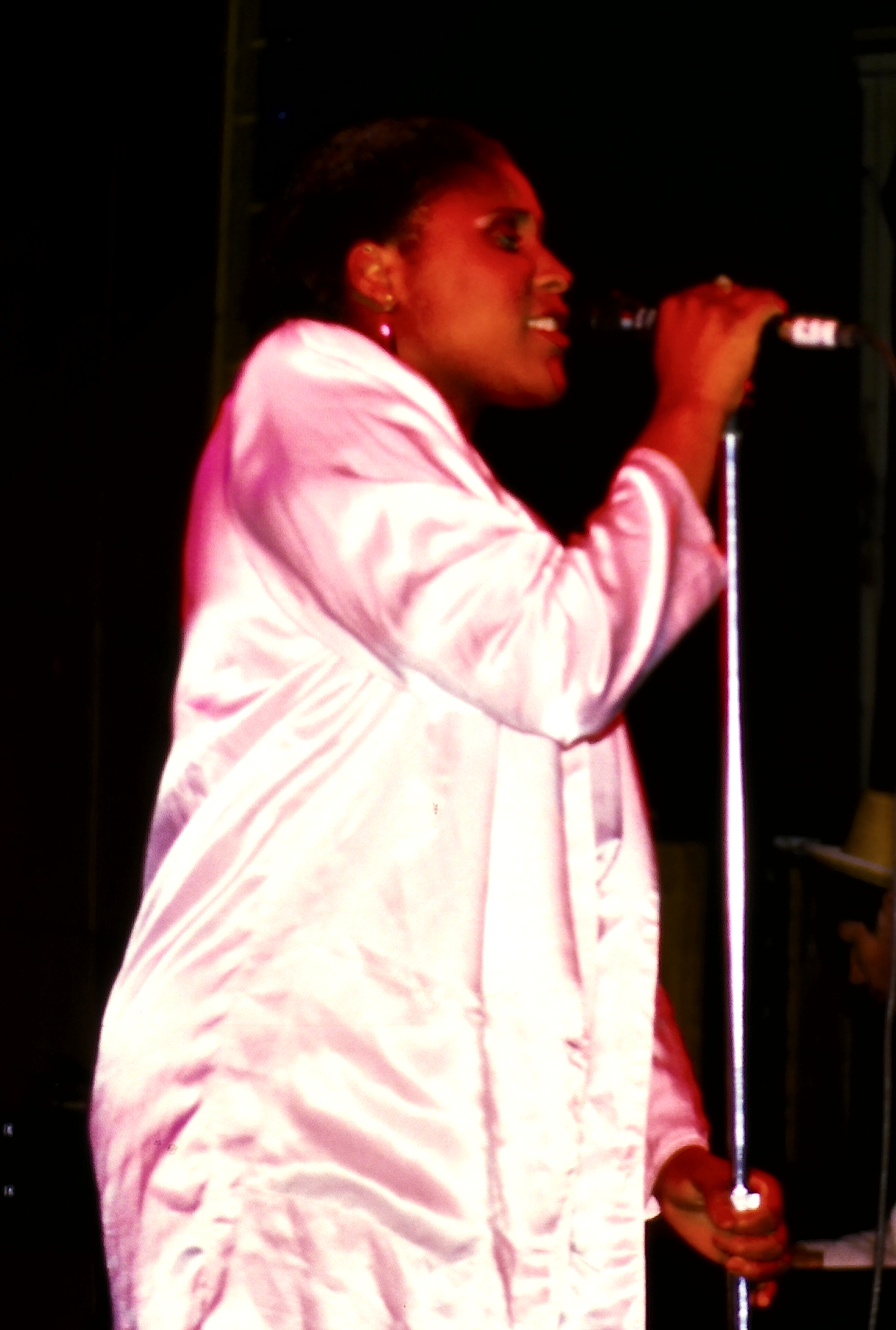
- Juliet Roberts, 1985

Background information
- Also known as: Julie Roberts
- Born: 6 May 1962 (age 63); London, England
- Genres: Jazz, rock, soul, house
- Occupations: Singer, songwriter
- Years active: 1982–present
- Labels: Bluebird; Cooltempo; Delirious

Juliet Roberts (born 6 May 1962) is a British jazz, rock, soul and house music singer of Grenadian descent.

== Career ==
Roberts was born in London, England. She originally recorded as Julie Roberts in 1982, and performed on the 1983 top 10 hit single "It's Over" by Funk Masters. In July 1983, she released the single "Fool for You" backed with "It's Been a Long, Long Time" on the Bluebird Records label, catalogue reference BRT3. The single peaked at No. 77 on the Gallup chart, week ending 20 August 1983.

In 1984, Roberts began a four-year stint as vocalist for the jazz group Working Week. She also released another single on Bluebird, "The Old Rugged Cross" b/w "I'm So Glad". In 1986, she released "Ain't You Had Enough Love", which was covered by Phyllis Hyman the following year. in 1986, Roberts also presented Channel 4's Solid Soul programme with Chris Forbes.

In 1990, she provided backing vocals on Cathy Dennis's Move to This album, as well as on Breathe's album Peace of Mind.

Roberts collaborated with British house group L.A. Mix on their two albums, On the Side and Coming Back for More in 1989 and 1990 respectively. She appears on several tracks, among them the single "We Shouldn't Hold Hands in the Dark", which reached No. 69 in the UK Singles Chart in 1991. The mastermind behind L.A. Mix was British DJ, producer and songwriter Les Adams.

In 1992, Roberts provided backing vocals on Dannii Minogue's single "Love's on Every Corner" (which was written by Cathy Dennis, and produced by Danny D, a.k.a. D Mob). Roberts' next release was in 1993 as a dance music artist, with the hit single "I Want You": A number one on the US dance charts and No. 44 U.S. Billboard Hot 100) and the house music offering, "Caught in the Middle", which also went to number one on the dance chart. An album, Natural Thing, followed in 1994. Roberts has also taught British television viewers vocal performance basics on the UK's Rockschool TV series. In addition to her solo and musical ensemble projects, she is in demand as a backing vocalist. Since 1997, she has had three UK top 20 hits: "So Good", "Bad Girls" and "Needin U II".

== Discography ==
=== Albums ===
Year	Album	Label	Format	UK
1994	Natural Thing	Reprise, Cooltempo	LP, CD	65
2002	Beneath the Surface	Dune	CD	—
"—" denotes releases that did not chart.

=== Singles ===
==== As lead artist ====
Year	Title	Peak chart positions			
Year	Title	US Dance	US R&B	US 100	UK
1984	"The Old Rugged Cross"	―	―	―	―
1984	"I Don't Want to Lose You"	―	―	―	―
1985	"Ain't You Had Enough Love"	―	―	―	―
1985	"More Than One Night"	―	―	―	―
1991	"Again"	―	―	―	33
1992	"Free Love"	7	―	―	25
1992	"Another Place Another Day Another Time"	―	―	―	―
1993	"Caught in the Middle"	―	―	―	24
1994	"I Want You"	1	78	44	28
1994	"Caught in the Middle" (Remix)	1	―	―	14
1996	"Never Had a Love Like This Before" (with Steven Dante)	―	―	―	87
1997	"So Good"	―	―	―	15
1998	"Free Love 98" (Remix)	―	―	―	15
1998	"Bad Girls"	―	―	―	17
1999	"No One Can Love You More"	―	―	―	―
"—" denotes releases that did not chart or were not released in that territory.

==== As featured artist ====
Title	Year	Peak chart positions					Album
Title	Year	UK	UK Dance	IRE	GER	US Dance	Album
"It's Over" (with the Funk Masters)	1983	8	—	—	—	—	non-album single
"We Shouldn't Hold Hands in the Dark" (with L.A. Mix)	1991	69	—	—	—	—	Coming Back for More
"Needin U II" (with David Morales)	2001	11	1	18	66	1	non-album single
"—" denotes releases that did not chart or were not released in that territory.

== See also ==
- List of number-one dance hits (United States)
- List of artists who reached number one on the US Dance chart
