= Let the Music (Lift You Up) =

Single by Loveland featuring Rachel McFarlane

from the album The Wonder of Love
- B-side: "Loveland's Theme"
- Released: 1994
- Genre: Disco; house
- Length: 3:29
- Label: 12INC; Eastern Bloc Records; KMS
- Songwriters: Hassan Watkins; Loveland; Mike Banks
- Producer: Loveland

Loveland featuring Rachel McFarlane singles chronology
"Let the Music (Lift You Up)" (1994)	"(Keep On) Shining/Hope (Never Give Up)" (1994)

Music video
- "Let the Music (Lift You Up)" on YouTube

"Let the Music (Lift You Up)" is a song by British house music group Loveland featuring singer Rachel McFarlane, released in 1994 by labels 12INC, Eastern Bloc Records and KMS as their debut single. It was co-written by Hassan Watkins and Mike Banks, and is a cover of a song by American singer Darlene Lewis. Some of the single releases also featured both versions. The Loveland version was included on the group's only album, The Wonder of Love (1995), and peaked at number 16 on the UK Singles Chart. It also reached number-one on both the Music Week Dance Singles chart and the UK Club Chart, and won the Best Dance Record of the Year award at the Silver Clef Award.

== Critical reception ==
Larry Flick from Billboard magazine wrote, "Virtually flawless disco/house number is poised to glide from atop U.K. dance charts onto stateside dancefloors within seconds. Track pumps a heavy beat, which is tied in flowing ribbons of strings and horns. Rachel McFarlane provides a bright flash of diva belting, proving her moxie by holding her own against a busy, effect-filled arrangement. Rhythm/crossover radio tastemakers are advised to open their minds and ears." Andy Beevers from Music Week gave it a top score of five out of five and named it Single of the Week in the category of Dance, and a "huge house track from Manchester".

He added, "The Full On Vocal Mix, with its pounding pianos and hackneyed lyrics, is undeniably old-fashioned and is about as cheesy as a lorryload of Wotsits. But it comes with a guarantee to create absolute mayhem on all but the most elite of dancefloors." James Hamilton from the Record Mirror Dance Update felt the Loveland cover version of the Darlene Lewis song is "much more exciting". Mark Sutherland from Smash Hits gave it two out of five, viewing it as "a routine rave-up stomper by some blokes you've never heard of that will nonetheless "storm" the charts." Another Smash Hits editor, Emma Cochrane, felt it "was pretty good".

== Track listing ==
- 12", Europe (1994)
1. "Let the Music (Lift You Up)" (Full On Vocal Radio Edit)
2. "Let the Music (Lift You Up)" (Full On Vocal Extended Mix)
3. "Let the Music (Lift You Up)" (Bottom Dollar Big Room Dub)
4. "Loveland's Theme"
- CD single, France (1994)
1. "Let the Music (Lift You Up)" (Full On Vocal Radio Edit) – 3:29
2. "Let the Music (Lift You Up)" (Big Room Dub) – 5:40
- CD maxi, US (1994)
1. "Let the Music (Lift You Up)" (Full On Vocal Mix) – 6:14
2. "Let the Music (Lift You Up)" (Bottom Dollar Remix) – 5:34
3. "Let the Music (Lift You Up)" (Publicly Executed Dub) – 6:32
4. "Let the Music (Lift You Up)" (Big Room Dub) – 5:40
5. "Loveland's Theme" – 4:13

== Charts ==
=== Weekly charts ===
Darlene Lewis version

Chart (1994)	Peak position
UK Singles (OCC)	
UK Club Chart (Music Week)	47

Loveland version

Chart (1994)	Peak position
Australia (ARIA)	162
Europe (Eurochart Hot 100)	55
Israel (Israeli Singles Chart)	18
Scotland (OCC)	21
UK Singles (OCC	16
UK Airplay (Music Week)	26
UK Dance (Music Week)	1
UK Club Chart (Music Week)	1
US Hot Dance Club Play (Billboard)	19
US Maxi-Singles Sales (Billboard)	19

=== Year-end charts ===
Loveland version

Chart (1994)	Position
UK Singles (OCC)	200
UK Club Chart (Music Week)	1
