= Natural Thing (Juliet Roberts album) =

Studio album by Juliet Roberts
- Released: 1994
- Genre: Dance; funk/soul; jazz; disco
- Length: 44:50
- Label: Reprise; Cooltempo
- Producer: Dancin' Danny D; Juliet Roberts; David & Wayne Lewis

Juliet Roberts chronology
| Natural Thing (1994) | Beneath the Surface (2002) |

Professional ratings
Review scores
| Source | Rating |
|---|---|
| AllMusic | 2.5/5 stars |
| Billboard | (favorable) |
| Knoxville News Sentinel | 2/5 stars |
| Music Week | 4/5 stars |
| The Observer | (favorable) |
| Select | 2/5 medals |

Natural Thing is the debut album by British jazz, rock, soul and house music singer Juliet Roberts, released in 1994 by Reprise and Cooltempo Records. The album was mostly produced by Roberts with Dancin' Danny D and features her two successful hit singles "Caught in the Middle" and "I Want You". It peaked at No. 65 on the UK Official Charts.

== Critical reception ==
In a positive review of the album, Billboard magazine wrote, "This ex-Working Week front woman has the enviable ability to alter the tone of her voice to suit the style of material she tackles. As a result, her first solo outing is a veritable smorgasbord of musical flavors ranging from diva-driven disco and haughty funk to sultry jazz and soul. Aided mostly by producer Danny D., Roberts' songwriting is equally chameleon-like. 'I Want You', a recent club smash that has begun to stride up the Hot 100, is awash in playful, tongue-twisting wordplay, while 'Eyes of a Child' is poetic and pensive. It adds up to an album that is armed with multiformat potential."

Chuck Campbell from Knoxville News Sentinel praised "the uplifting single 'I Want You', a joyous dance number with a great hook. Ditto the happy, showy 'Free Love'. The spunky title track is almost as catchy." Alan Jones from Music Week wrote, "Albums by female soloists have never been so popular and Juliet Roberts has already proved her mettle by pulling a trio of Top 40 hits off this, her debut album, even before it is released. And it's an album to savour, giving Roberts ample opportunity to prove that while she has a great voice for dance music, she's equally at home in more mellow mood. Destined to spin off further hits, and likely to sell well for some time to come."

== Track listing ==
US & Canada version

| No. | Title | Writer(s) | Length |
|---|---|---|---|
| 1. | "I Want You" (7" Edit) | Juliet Roberts; Nathaniel Pierre Jones | 4:04 |
| 2. | "Caught in the Middle" | Roberts; Danny Poku | 4:43 |
| 3. | "Free Love" (7" Classic Mix) | Roberts; Gerry DeVeaux; Curtis Kahill | 4:11 |
| 4. | "Tell Me" | Roberts; Poku | 4:26 |
| 5. | "Force of Nature" | Roberts; Danny Madden | 4:21 |
| 6. | "Save It" | Roberts; Mike Stevens | 5:30 |
| 7. | "Again" | Lionel Newman; Dorcas Cochran | 4:00 |
| 8. | "Natural Thing" | Roberts; Tony Swain | 4:19 |
| 9. | "September" | Roberts; Alex Brown; David Lewis; Wayne Lewis | 4:11 |
| 10. | "Eyes of a Child" | Roberts; Swain | 5:05 |

International version

| No. | Title | Writer(s) | Length |
|---|---|---|---|
| 1. | "Caught in the Middle" | Roberts; Poku | 3:30 |
| 2. | "Free Love" | Roberts; DeVeaux; Kahill | 4:10 |
| 3. | "Tell Me" | Roberts; Poku | 5:05 |
| 4. | "Life Goes Around" (with Courtney Pine) | Roberts | 4:16 |
| 5. | "Someone Like You" | Paul Johnson; Phil Edwards | 5:23 |
| 6. | "Force of Nature" | Roberts; Madden | 4:21 |
| 7. | "Save It" | Roberts; Stevens | 5:30 |
| 8. | "Again" | Newman; Cochran | 4:00 |
| 9. | "I Want You" | Roberts; Jones | 5:00 |
| 10. | "September" | Roberts; Brown; D. Lewis; W. Lewis | 4:11 |
| 11. | "Eyes of a Child" | Roberts; Swain | 5:05 |
| 12. | "Natural Thing" | Roberts; Swain | 4:20 |
| 13. | "Caught in the Middle" (Original Mix) | Roberts; Poku | 4:07 |
| 14. | "Free Love" (Original Mix) | Roberts; DeVeaux; Kahill | 3:38 |

Note

- Tracks 13 and 14 not available on LP & cassette versions.

== Charts ==
| Chart (1994) | Peak position |
|---|---|
| UK Albums Chart (OCC) | 65 |
