= Underground Music Movement =

Underground Music Movement (UMM) is an Italian house music label based in Naples and founded by Angelo Tardio. The UMM catalogue includes classic releases from artists including Daft Punk, Todd Terry, Roger Sanchez, Alex Party, Fathers of Sound, Blast, Francesco Farfa, Glenn Underground, and MAW.
