= Judy Cheeks =

American singer (1954–2025)

Background information
- Born: February 13, 1954; Miami, Florida, U.S.
- Died: November 26, 2025 (aged 71)
- Genres: R&B; soul; disco; dance; electronic
- Occupation: Singer
- Instrument: Vocals
- Website: judycheeksmusic.com

Judy Cheeks (February 13, 1954 – November 26, 2025) was an American singer. In the 1970s and 1980s, she recorded as a soul and R&B singer, before releasing more dance-oriented music in the 1990s. Cheeks performed with Ike & Tina Turner as an Ikette. She also worked as a backing vocalist for artists such as Stevie Wonder, Donna Summer, Amanda Lear, and David Knopfler.

== Life and career ==
=== Early life ===
Cheeks was born in Miami, Florida on February 13, 1954. She was the daughter of gospel singer, Rev. Julius Cheeks.

=== Music career ===
Her debut album entitled Judy Cheeks was produced by Ike & Tina Turner and recorded at their Bolic Sound studio in 1973. A tour with Ike & Tina Turner followed, and she also performed as an Ikette. Cheeks moved to Germany in 1977 and recorded a duet with Austrian singer Udo Jürgens. Their performance on The Rudi Carrell Show made Cheeks an overnight success in Europe. In 1978, she recorded "Mellow Lovin'" which became an international hit and reached No. 10 on the Hot Dance Club Play chart. Her 1978 album Mellow Lovin' was produced by Anthony Monn (best known for his work with gay icon Amanda Lear) in Giorgio Moroder's Musicland Studios in Munich.

Cheeks wrote for Berry Gordy's publishing form Jobete Music. The Jackson 5 recorded one of her songs "We're Gonna Change Our Style." She did a lot of session work for several major artists while sharpening her songwriting skills. Cheeks appears as a backing vocalist for Thelma Houston and Jerry Butler's album Just Thelma & Jerry (1977), Donna Summer's Once upon a Time (1977), Amanda Lear's album Never Trust a Pretty Face (1979), Stevie Wonder's soundtrack album The Woman In Red (1984), and on Boney M.'s album Ten Thousand Lightyears (1984). In 1986, Cheeks provided backing vocals on Alphaville's album Afternoons in Utopia.

Cheeks co-wrote and produced her solo album No Outsiders, released by Polydor in 1987. In the same year, she appeared with Austrian band, Opus, on their self-titled album being co-vocalist on the song, "Givin' a Gift." Cheeks had a career resurgence in the 1990s, when she re-emerged with a string of dance chart hits, including two No. 1s, "Respect" and "As Long As You're Good to Me", released on EMI's imprint Brilliant! in 1995. Her single "Reach" appeared on the Summer Hitmix 94 CD released by ZYX Records in Germany. A solo album, also titled Respect, was released in 1995.

In 2013, Cheeks wrote and co produced her own solo album, True Love is Free. In 2018, she released her single and remixes of "Crying In The Rain"; a song she had written and first recorded by Randy Crawford as "When The Evening Comes". This was followed by the album Danger Zone. In February 2019, Cheeks released a further album of original material, A Deeper Love. In 2020, Cheeks released a new album of original material. "Love Dancin'" the title track was co-written with Stevie Wonder, the album also includes a composition by Cheek's longtime friend Betty Wright "Safe In Your Arms." Also in 2020, she released the single "Within" followed by "Same Pain" in 2021 in a more acoustic country style. In 2023, Judy Cheeks started collaborating with POSE and released "Let Your Soul Dance" and "Hands Up In The Air". In 2024, the team released "Be Happy".

Rory Nicoll RMN and Jus Jez produced these singles; they co-wrote with Judy.

=== Other work ===
Cheeks acted in various movies and TV shows: She starred in her first movie Caribbean Rhapsody (Caribia, 1978) with Rossano Brazzi, filmed in Haiti. 1980 La playa del amor, 1984 SOKO 5113 (TV series, episode: Tapetenwechsel), and starred in one episode of the TV series Salzburger Nockerln in 1992.

Cheeks was the author of Love and Honor about her late father, Reverend Julius Cheeks.

== Death ==
Cheeks died on November 26, 2025, at the age of 71.

== Discography ==
=== Albums ===
- 1973: Judy Cheeks (United Artists)
- 1978: Please Give Me This Night (Ariola)
- 1978: Mellow Lovin' (Ariola, Salsoul)
- 1979: Disco Cheeks (Koala)
- 1983: Hard on the Heels of Love (Durium)
- 1988: No Outsiders (Polydor)
- 1995: Respect (EMI, Positiva) – No. 99 on the UK Albums Chart
- 2013: True Love is Free (Mozan Music)
- 2018: Danger Zone (Mozan Music)
- 2019: A Deeper Love (Mozan Music)
- 2020: Love Dancin' (Mozan Music)

=== Singles ===
Year	Single	Label	US Hot 100	US R&B	US Dance	AUS	BEL	UK	Album
1973	"Crazy 'Bout You Baby"	United Artists							Judy Cheeks
1974	"Endlessly"	United Artists							Judy Cheeks
1978	"Mellow Lovin'"	Salsoul	65	53	10		28		Mellow Lovin'
1978	"The Little Girl in Me"	Ariola							Mellow Lovin'
1979	"Don't Wanna Love You Again"	Ariola							
1980	"Mercy"	Ariola							
1983	"Fascination"	Dureco							Hard on the Heels of Love
1987	"You'll Never Be Alone"	Polydor							
1988	"I Still Love You"	Polydor				85		98	No Outsiders
1993	"So in Love (The Real Deal)"	Positiva			25			27	Respect
1994	"Reach"	Positiva			24			17	Respect
1995	"This Time" / "Respect"	Positiva						23	Respect
1995	"Respect"	Brilliant!			1				Respect
1995	"You're the Story of My Life"/"As Long as You're Good to Me"	Positiva						30	Respect
1995	"As Long as You're Good to Me"	Brilliant!			1				Respect
1996	"Reach" (Remix)	Positiva						22	
2013	"Happy"	Mozan Music							True Love Is Free
2013	"I Love Praising You"	Mozan Music							True Love Is Free
2013	"Without Love We're Lost" Remixes	Mozan Music							True Love Is Free

=== Backing vocal credits ===
- 1977: Thelma Houston & Jerry Butler – Thelma & Jerry
- 1977: Donna Summer – Once Upon A Time
- 1979: Amanda Lear – Never Trust A Pretty Face
- 1979: Patrick Gammon - Don't Touch Me
- 1984: Peter Hofmann – Peter Hofmann 2 (Ivory Man / Songs & Ballads)
- 1984: Al Corley – Square Rooms
- 1984: Boney M. – Ten Thousand Lightyears
- 1984: Stevie Wonder – "Love Light in Flight"
- 1985: David Knopfler – Behind The Lines
- 1986: Limahl – Colour All My Days
- 1986: Kissing The Pink – Certain Things Are Likely
- 1986: Alphaville – Afternoons In Utopia
- 1989: James Reyne – Hard Reyne
- 1991: Jackie Quinn – Don't Force The River
- 1992: Sergio Dalma – Adivina
- 1993: The Creeps – Seriouslessness

== See also ==
- List of Billboard number-one dance club songs
- List of artists who reached number one on the U.S. Dance Club Songs chart
