= Pizzaman (duo) =

British electronic music duo (1993–1997)

- Origin: London, England
- Genres: Breakbeat, house, tech house
- Years active: 1993–1997
- Label: Cowboy
- Past members: John Reid; Norman Cook

Pizzaman was a British electronic music duo consisting of John Reid and Norman Cook (born 31 July 1963).

== Biography ==
Their debut album, "Pizzamania", was released in 1995. The album spawned three singles (with videos directed by Michael Dominic) all of which reached the top forty on the UK Singles Chart. The highest charting of these was "Happiness" (#19), until "Trippin' on Sunshine" performed slightly better (#18) when it was re-released the following year. Despite this success, however, the only follow-up material was 1996 single "Hello Honky Tonks (Rock Your Body)".

"Sex on the Streets" sampled a part of a 1974 sermon by American evangelist Jack van Impe.

After the group disbanded in 1997, Cook went on to greater success under the name Fatboy Slim.

== Discography ==
=== Albums ===
Title	Details	Peak chart positions
Title	Details	AUS
Pizzamania	Label: Cowboy; Released: 1995; Format: CD, CS, LP	141

=== Singles ===
Title	Year	Peak chart positions						Album
Title	Year	UK	AUS	BEL (FL)	CAN Dance	GER	NL	Album
"Trippin' on Sunshine"	1994	33	—	—	—	—	—	Pizzamania
"Sex on the Streets"	1995	23	207	38	5	36	20	Pizzamania
"Happiness"	1995	19	64	—	—	—	—	Pizzamania
"Trippin' on Sunshine" (re-release)	1996	18	140	—	—	—	—	Pizzamania
"Hello Honky Tonks (Rock Your Body)"	1996	41	—	—	29	—	—	Non-album single
"Gottaman"	1997	85	—	—	—	—	—	Pizzamania
"—" denotes releases that did not chart.
