= Alex Party =

Italian electronic dance group from 1993 to 2000

- Origin: Italy
- Genres: Italo house
- Years active: 1993–2020
- Past members: Paolo Visnadi; Gianni Visnadi; Alex Natale; Shanie Campbell

Alex Party is an Italian electronic dance group. The band consisted of the Italian brothers Paolo and Gianni Visnadi (also of Livin' Joy), DJ Alex Natale, and vocalist, singer and songwriter Shanie Campbell.

Their most famous single to date is "Don't Give Me Your Life", a #2 hit in both the Republic of Ireland and the United Kingdom in early 1995. The group's first single, "Saturday Night Party (Read My Lips)", was an immediate success, and became an Ibiza anthem during the summer of 1993. It became their first Top 40 hit in the United Kingdom, peaking at #29.

== History ==
=== "Don't Give Me Your Life" ===
They released the single "Don't Give Me Your Life" in 1994, being an extended remix to the original "Alex Party" track. It reached #2 in both Ireland and the United Kingdom (their highest charting hit in those countries), #5 on the US Dance charts, and #13 in Australia, plus it topped and made the No 1 position and was Club Record of the year at Music Week's 1995 Awards.

=== Other releases ===
A follow-up single to the multi-named "Alex Party / Saturday Night Party / Read My Lips" single was released entitled "Alex Party 2" but was only available on 12" Vinyl. It was relatively unknown as it received little to no promotion. The track, along with the same remixes as on the vinyl release was included on a special Singapore CD Single of "Don't Give Me Your Life".

The group continued to have moderate success following the success of "Don't Give Me Your Life", including "Wrap Me Up", which was released in late 1995, peaking at #17 in the UK and #11 in Australia (where it was the group's last charting single).

A revamped version of the first single was released in 1996 that included added vocals by Shanie and was entitled "Read My Lips". It reached #28 in the UK chart. Same year an official 'Megamix' single was released including "Don't Give Me Your Life", "Read My Lips", "Simple Things", and "Wrap Me Up".

In 1997, "Simple Things" was the next single to be released and it achieved moderate sales.

In 1999 "Don't Give Me Your Life" was re-released which included new mixes and a full-length bonus track Megamix from 1996.

Although the last single which was released in the year 2000 was "U Gotta Be" a rare, unreleased, and virtually unknown track entitled "You Can't Escape My Love" appeared on a Portuguese compilation album, named Top Star 2001, on the Vidisco record label.

=== Remixes ===
Alongside releasing singles, Alex Natale was assisted by the Visnadi brothers to remix tracks for many artists. Notable artists remixed include 2 Unlimited, The Shamen, Jinny, Clubzone, Alison Limerick, Everything but the Girl, and Gipsy.

== Discography ==
=== Studio albums ===
List of albums, with Australian chart positions
Title	Album details	Peak chart positions
Title	Album details	AUS
Alex Party	Released: 1996; Label: Dance Net	59

=== Singles ===
Year	Title	Peak chart positions											Certifications	Album
Year	Title	ITA	AUS	AUT	FIN	GER	IRE	NED	SCO	SWE	SWI	UK	Certifications	Album
1993	"Alex Party (Saturday Night Party)"	—	—	—	—	—	—	—	—	—	—	49		Non-album single
1994	"Alex Party (Saturday Night Party)" (re-issue)	—	—	—	—	—	—	—	39	—	—	29		Non-album single
1995	"Don't Give Me Your Life"	22	13	—	—	24	2	16	2	—	30	2	BPI: Gold	Alex Party
1995	"Wrap Me Up"	2	11	38	15	63	30	—	20	31	—	17	ARIA: Gold	Alex Party
1996	"Read My Lips"	—	51	—	—	—	—	—	32	—	—	28		Alex Party
1997	"Simple Things"	13	—	—	—	—	—	—	—	—	—	—		Alex Party
2000	"U Gotta Be"	33	—	—	—	—	—	82	—	—	—	—		Non-album single
"—" denotes items that did not chart or were not released in that territory.
