= Jinny (band) =

Musical group

- Origin: Brescia, Italy
- Genres: Italo house, Eurodance
- Years active: 1990–1995
- Labels: TIME, Italian Style Production
- Past members: Alessandro Gilardi; Claudio Varola; Federico Di Bonaventura; Walter Cremonini; Carryl Varley

Jinny were an Italian 1990s band consisting of Alessandro Gilardi, Claudio Varola, Federico Di Bonaventura and Walter Cremonini and featured various singers including Sandy Chambers and Carryl Varley as a lip-synching model for the music videos. Their most successful single is "Keep Warm", which was released in 1991 and re-released in 1995.

== Discography ==
=== Singles ===
Year	Single	Peak chart positions						Album
Year	Single	AUS	AUT	SWE	UK	US	US Dance	Album
1990	"Do You Want Me"	—	—	—	—	—	—	Singles only
1990	"I Need Your Love"	—	—	—	—	—	—	Singles only
1991	"Keep Warm"	—	—	—	68	97	13	Singles only
1992	"Never Give Up"	—	—	—	—	—	—	Singles only
1993	"Feel the Rhythm"	—	21	22	74	—	—	Singles only
1994	"One More Time"	153	—	—	—	—	—	Singles only
1995	"Keep Warm" (re-release)	136	—	—	11	—	—	Singles only
1995	"Wanna Be with You"	190	—	—	30	—	—	Singles only
"—" denotes releases that did not chart
