= Roger McKenzie (musician) =

English musician and DJ (1971–1995)

- Also known as: Wildchild, DJ Wildchild
- Born: 22 July 1971; Southampton, England
- Died: 25 November 1995 (aged 24)
- Genres: Electronic, house
- Occupation(s): DJ, musician
- Years active: 1988–1995
- Labels: Ultra; Polydor

Roger McKenzie (22 July 1971 – 25 November 1995), also known under his production aliases of Wildchild or DJ Wildchild, was an English musician and DJ.

== Biography ==
Born in Southampton, England, he released many singles on labels such as Hi Life Recordings, Ultra Records and Polydor. The tracks "Jump to My Beat", "Renegade Master" (famously sampling "One for the Trouble" by A.D.O.R.) and the subsequent "Renegade Master '98" were his most successful. Fatboy Slim's 1998 Old Skool Mix is perhaps the most famous version of "Renegade Master". "Renegade Master" was Wildchild's first hit single in 1995, peaking at No. 11 on the UK Singles Chart, but was surpassed by the success of Fatboy Slim's remix "Renegade Master '98", which peaked at No. 3 in 1998.

Just before his death at the age of 24 from an undiagnosed heart condition, McKenzie formed his own record label, Dark & Black. On 6 April 1996, his girlfriend Donna Snell gave birth to their son, Noir. His record label founded the Wildchild Music Foundation in his memory.

== Charting singles ==
Year	Title	UK	Label
10 April 1995	"Legends of the Dark Black Pt 2" †	34	Hi-Life Records
9 October 1995	"Renegade Master" †	11	Hi-Life Records
11 November 1996	"Jump to My Beat"	30	Hi-Life Records
5 January 1998	"Renegade Master '98"	3	Hi-Life Records
13 April 1998	"Bad Boy" ‡	38	Polydor Records

- † These tracks were identical, despite their different titles
- ‡ Wildchild featuring Jamalski
