= Michael Dominic =

American filmmaker and photojournalist

- Born: Michael Joseph Dominic; June 18, 1970 (age 55); Washington D.C., U.S.
- Occupations: Filmmaker, photographer
- Years active: 1990–present
- Website: http://michaeldominic.com

Michael Dominic (born June 18, 1970) is an American filmmaker and photojournalist who grew up in New York City. He is best known for his documentary Sunshine Hotel, which won three awards for best documentary.

== Early life ==
Dominic was born in Washington D.C., the son of Stephanie and Joseph Dominic. In 1971 his family moved to the Riverdale section of the Bronx, New York.

He studied film at School of Visual Arts in New York City from 1990 to 1993.

== Career ==
Dominic has made several films, most notably the feature-length documentaries Sunshine Hotel and Clean Hands, and the narrative short "Tulips for Daisy".

Sunshine Hotel, a documentary about one of the last flophouses on New York City's Bowery, won three best documentary awards and was nominated for another dozen or so. After its festival run of almost 30 film festivals it aired on the Sundance Channel from 2002 to 2004.

"Tulips for Daisy", a narrative film set in Amsterdam, was also nominated for several awards, most notably in the Akira Kurosawa Memorial Short Film Competition.

As a photojournalist Dominic has traveled to places including Haiti, Honduras, Guatemala, and Nicaragua. His photography has appeared in dozens of outlets including The Sunday Telegraph, Tribune De Geneve, France-Amérique, The New York Daily News, The Wall Street Journal, The New York Post, Playboy, Redbook, Le Figaro, Le Parisien, Bilan, Chåtelaine, and L'actualité.

In July 2012 Dominic was recognized as a finalist for The New York Foundation for the Arts 2012 fellowship.

In January 2019 Dominic completed the feature documentary Clean Hands, about the Lopez family surviving against the backdrop of Central America’s largest garbage dump, La Chureca in Managua, Nicaragua. The film debuted at the 29th Annual Cinequest Film Festival April 9, 2019, where it won Best Documentary Feature. It went on to win a total of 11 awards.

== Filmography as director ==
- Soup & the Dead (1994)
- Sunshine Hotel (2001)
- Tulips for Daisy (2006)
- Clean Hands (2019)
