= Inside Out (disambiguation) =

Inside Out is a 2015 coming-of-age film.

Inside Out may also refer to:

- Backwards or inverse

== Film ==
- Inside Out (franchise), a Pixar media franchise
  - Inside Out 2 (2024), the second film of the franchise
- Inside Out (1975 film), a comedy thriller starring Telly Savalas and James Mason
- Inside Out (1986 film), by Robert Taicher about a man suffering from agoraphobia, starring Elliott Gould
- Inside/Out (1988 film), a Canadian short film by Lori Spring
- Inside/Out (1997 film), an American drama directed by Rob Tregenza
- Inside Out (2005 film), a thriller starring Eriq La Salle and Steven Weber
- Inside Out (2011 film), starring Triple H

== Books ==
- Inside Out (Moore memoir), a 2019 memoir by actress Demi Moore
- Inside Out: A Personal History of Pink Floyd, by Pink Floyd drummer Nick Mason
- Inside Out, Christian book by Larry Crabb
- Inside Out, espionage thriller by Barry Eisler
- Inside Out & Back Again, children's book by Thanhha Lai
- Inside Out, 2014 novel by Ann M. Martin. Boy with autistic brother wants a normal life.
- Inside Out, 2016 novel by Maria V. Snyder. Dystopian sci-fi.
- Inside Out: Straight Talk from a Gay Jock, 2006 autobiography by Mark Tewksbury
- Inside Out, 2003 novel by Terry Trueman

== Television ==
- Inside Out (2000 TV series), a Scottish children's series
- Inside Out (2002 TV programme), a BBC series
- Inside/Out (American TV series), broadcast on PBS during the 1970s to teach children about social issues
- "Inside Out" (2 Stupid Dogs), an episode of 2 Stupid Dogs
- "Inside Out" (Angel), a 2003 episode of the television series Angel
- "Inside Out" (CSI: Miami), episode 123 of the television series CSI: Miami
- "Inside Out" (Knight Rider), a 1982 episode
- "Inside Out" (The Unit), an episode of the television series The Unit
- Inside Out (Singaporean TV series), a current affairs program that was broadcast on SPH MediaWorks Channel U
- Inside Out, a promotional documentary about singer Chris Willis 2010

== Music ==
=== Albums ===
- Inside Out (EP), by Anthrax, 1999
- Inside Out (Philip Bailey album), 1986
- Inside Out (Bon Jovi album), 2012
- In Side Out, a 1972 album by Edgar Broughton Band
- Inside Out (Cam Clarke album), 1999
- Inside Out (Chick Corea album), 1990
- Inside Out (Culture Beat album), 1995
- Inside Out (Bobby Darin album), 1967
- Inside Out (Kat DeLuna album), 2010
- Inside Out (Dilana album), 2009
- Inside Out (Dive album), 1993
- Inside Out (Fates Warning album), 1994
- Inside Out (The Flock album), 1975
- Inside Out (Lee Greenwood album), 1982
- Inside Out (Eddie Henderson album), 1974
- Inside Out (Keith Jarrett album), 2001
- Inside Out (Charlie Major album), 2004
- Inside Out (John Martyn album), 1973
- Inside Out (MC Hammer album), 1995
- Inside Out (Joe McPhee album), 1996
- Inside Out (Sue Medley album), 1992
- Inside Out (Emmy Rossum album), 2007
- Inside Out, 2003, by Nate Sallie
- Inside Out (Trisha Yearwood album), 2001
- Inside Out (XXI album), 2015

=== Songs ===
- "Inside Out" (Anthrax song), 1998
- "Inside Out" (Avalanche City song), 2015
- "Inside Out" (Britney Spears song), 2011
- "Inside Out" (Bryan Adams song), 1998
- "Inside Out" (Camila Cabello song), 2018
- "Inside Out" (Chainsmokers song), 2016
- "Inside Out" (Culture Beat song), 1995
- "Inside Out" (Eve 6 song), 1998
- "Inside Out" (Five Finger Death Punch song), 2019
- "Inside Out" (Imelda May song), 2011
- "Inside Out" (Into a Circle song), 1986
- "Inside Out" (Odyssey song), 1982
- "Inside Out" (Shara Nelson song), 1993
- "Inside Out" (Soulhead song), Batti Baas' second single
- "Inside Out" (Traveling Wilburys song), 1990
- "Inside Out" (Vonray song), 2003
- "Inside Out" (Zedd and Griff song), 2020
- "Inside Out", a 2008 song by Cadia
- "Inside Out", a Cause and Effect song from the 1994 album Trip
- "Inside Out", a Crash Vegas song from the 1989 album Red Earth
- "Inside Out", a Duster song from the 1998 album Stratosphere
- "Inside Out", a 1980 song by Gentle Giant from Civilian
- "Inside Out", a Madonna song from the 2015 album Rebel Heart
- "Inside Out", a Mighty Lemon Drops song from the 1988 album World Without End
- "Inside Out", a Phil Collins song from the 1985 album No Jacket Required
- "Inside Out", a 2025 song by The Script from Satellites
- "Inside Out", a Spoon song from the 2014 album They Want My Soul
- "Inside Out", a Warrant song from the 1992 album Dog Eat Dog
- "Inside Out", an XYZ song from the 1989 album XYZ

=== Other music ===
- Inside Out (musical), a 1994 Off-Broadway musical by Adryan Russ
- Inside Out Music, a record label specialising in progressive rock and progressive metal
- Inside Out (band), a late 1980s band
- Insideout, a 1990s Israeli Euro House duo
- Inside Out, a former name of the Christian rock band PFR

== Other uses ==
- Inside Out Film and Video Festival, a non-profit LGBT film organization
- Inside-Out Prison Exchange Program, a national program based in Philadelphia at Temple University
- Inside Out, a juggling manoeuvre, a variant on the Mills Mess juggling pattern

== See also ==
- Eversion (disambiguation)
- Inside (disambiguation)
- Outside In (disambiguation)
