= Latynin =

Latynin (feminine: Latynina) is a Russian surname associated with the noble Latynin faminy. Notable people with the surname include:

- Alla Latynina (born 1940), Russian literary critic
- Boris Latynin ( 1899–1967), Soviet archaeologist
- Larisa Latynina (born 1934), Soviet gymnast
- Leonid Latynin (born 1938), Russian writer
- Yulia Latynina (born 1966), Russian writer and journalist
