= Outside In =

Outside In may refer to:

- Outside In (film), a 2017 film
- Outside In, a 1994 computer-generated film demonstrating sphere eversion created by the Geometry Center
- Outside In (book), a 2020 picture book
- Outside In (organization), a non-profit community clinic and youth service in Portland, Oregon
- Outside–in software development, a software development methodology

== See also ==
- Outside Inside (disambiguation)
- Outside Looking In (disambiguation)
- Inside Out (disambiguation)
