= The Inside =

The Inside may refer to:

- The Inside (TV series), 2005 American crime drama television series
- The Inside (album), an album by Zebra & Giraffe
- The Inside, a 2007 album by Moses Mayfield
- The Inside (film), 2012 Irish horror film by Eoin Macken

== See also ==
- Inside (disambiguation)
- The Insider (disambiguation)
