= Inside =

Inside may refer to:

== Film ==
- Inside (1996 film), an American television film directed by Arthur Penn and starring Eric Stoltz
- Inside (2002 film), a Canadian prison drama film
- Inside (2006 film), an American thriller film starring Nicholas D'Agosto and Leighton Meester
- Inside (2007 film), originally À l'intérieur, a French horror film directed by Alexandre Bustillo and Julien Maury
  - Inside (2016 film), a 2016 Spanish-American film remake of the 2007 film
- Inside (2011 film), an American social film
- Inside (2012 film), a Turkish drama film
- Inside (2013 film), an American horror film
- Inside (2023 film), psychological thriller film starring Willem Dafoe
- Inside (2024 film), an Australian prison drama film starring Guy Pearce
- Bo Burnham: Inside, a 2021 American comedy special

== Television ==
- "Inside" (American Horror Story), an episode of the tenth season of American Horror Story
- Inside (reality show), 2024 reality game show

== Music ==
=== Albums ===
- Inside (Bondy Chiu album), 1999
- Inside (BtoB 4U EP), 2020
- Inside (Eloy album), 1973
- Inside (Paul Horn album), 1968
- Inside (Ronnie Milsap album), 1982
- Inside (Bill Morrissey album), 1992
- Inside (Mother Mother album), 2021
- Inside (Orphanage album), 2000
- Inside (Parmalee album), 2004
- Inside (Presence album), 1993
- Inside (David Reilly EP), 2004
- Inside (David Sanborn album), 1999
- Inside (Matthew Sweet album), 1986
- Inside (White Heart album), 1995
- Inside (The Songs), 2021

=== Songs ===
- "Inside", by Don Toliver from Hardstone Psycho, 2024
- "Inside", by Jethro Tull from Benefit, 1970
- "Inside" (Ronnie Milsap song), 1982
- "Inside", by Moby from Play, 1999
- "Inside" (Monica song), 1999
- "Inside", by Peter, Paul and Mary from Peter, Paul & Mommy, Too, 1993
- "Inside" (Sevendust song), 2008
- "Inside" (Stiltskin song), 1994
- "Inside", by Sting from Sacred Love, 2003
- "Inside", by Toad The Wet Sprocket from Dulcinea (album), 1994
- "Inside", by Van Halen from 5150, 1986

== Others ==
- Inside (video game), a 2016 video game by Playdead
- Inside Recordings, a record label

== See also ==
- In (disambiguation)
- Inside Out (disambiguation)
- Insider (disambiguation)
- Insides (disambiguation)
- The Inside (disambiguation)
- Interior (disambiguation)
