= Outside Looking In =

Outside Looking In may refer to:

- Outside Looking In (album), by the BoDeans
- "Outside Looking In" (song), the debut single by Jordan Pruitt
- Outside Looking In (play), 1925 Broadway play by Maxwell Anderson
- Outside Looking In: The Best of the Gin Blossoms, a 1999 compilation
- Outside Looking In, an album by Dave Hole
- "Outside Looking In", a song by Bruce Springsteen from his 2010 album The Promise
- Outside Looking In (novel), by T. C. Boyle

== See also ==
- Inside Looking Out (disambiguation)
- Outside In (disambiguation)
