= Melissa Satta =

Italian television presenter

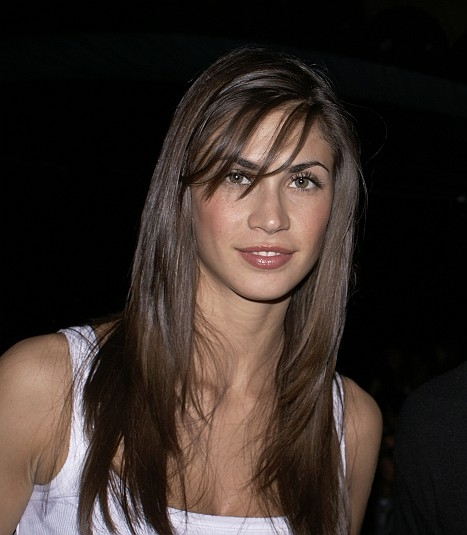
- Satta in May 2007
- Born: 7 February 1986 (age 40); Boston, Massachusetts, U.S.
- Citizenship: American and Italian
- Education: IULM University of Milan
- Occupation: television presenter
- Years active: 2002–present
- Spouse: Kevin-Prince Boateng (m. 2016; div. 2020)
- Partners: Daniele Interrante (2003–2006); Christian Vieri (2006–2011)
- Children: 1
- Modeling information
- Height: 1.76 m (5 ft 9 1/2 in)
- Hair color: Brown
- Eye color: Green
- Website: www.melissasatta.com

Melissa Satta (born 7 February 1986) is an Italian television presenter. She was a showgirl in the Italian satirical series Striscia la notizia. Satta has appeared in Maxim magazine and was featured in the 2010 Sports Illustrated swimsuit issue. Satta lives and works in Italy.

== Early life ==
Satta was born to Italian parents, native to the island of Sardinia, Mariangela Muzzu and Enzo Satta, on 7 February 1986 in Boston, Massachusetts, United States. She spent the early years of her childhood living both in the U.S. and in Sardinia. Satta's father, Enzo Satta, is an architect and he was a Sardinian government and central government politician in politics of Sardinia and political consultant and business partner to Prince Aga Khan IV from 1986 until 2003, in which he politically represented Costa Smeralda in Sardinia and was responsible for the architectural planning of Costa Smeralda. Satta has two brothers; an older brother, Riccardo, a business incubator and entrepreneur resident in the Principality of Monaco, and a younger brother, Maximilian. After graduating from high school in the United States, Satta enrolled in the faculty of Communication studies at the private university IULM, but there is no evidence of the achievement of the diploma and the end of her studies.

Satta has a history of sports, having practiced both women's football, which she played with the women's team of Sardinian Sant'Elena Quartu, and karate, winning the Sardinian Junior Karate Championships and a national junior bronze medal.

== Career ==
Satta began working in the fashion industry at age 16 in 2002. In 2003 she was among the finalists of the beauty contest Miss wall (edition 2003) and obtained the title of Miss extreme. In 2005, she began working as a presenter in the Italian television program Mio fratello è Pakistano, which was starred by presenter Teo Mammucari on Canale 5. In the same year she was appointed as spokesperson for the advertising of TIM.

Satta appeared on the Italian television program Striscia la notizia from 2006 to 2008. In 2006, she featured in numerous Mediaset television programs, such as Judge Mastrangelo 2 and had a minor part in the Italian movie Bastardi. In the fall of 2006, Satta paraded the catwalks in Milan's fashion spring / summer 2007 to the Pin Up Stars collection.

In the summer of 2007, she starred in the last part of the MTV Italy program Total Request Live, along with Alessandro Cattelan, and also presented on Fashion TV and the Italian The White Party Fashion TV satellite channel.

In the autumn of 2008, alongside Teo Mammucari, Satta presented the Italian quiz-show First and last, which was inspired by an English format of Endemol UK and was broadcast on Rai 1 in Italy. In the beginning of 2009, Satta became advertising protagonist of the commercials of Peugeot 107 Sweet Years and in September 2009, Satta replaced the Chilean model Maria Jose Lopez as the female face of the Italian talk show Controcampo on Rete 4. In 2009, Satta television presented for Victoria's Secret.

In February 2010, Satta featured in the magazine Sports Illustrated for the special issue dedicated to swimwear (Sports Illustrated Magazine Swimsuit Issue) for a photo shoot "wearing" a body painting representing the top of the Italy national football team. Throughout 2010, Satta presented Italian television show episodio pilota along with presenter Platinette; aired on Sky Italy. Also in 2010, Satta appeared on the June 2010 cover of Maxim.

In June 2011, Satta lead presented the scientific program Insideout (Tutti pazzi per la scienza); aired on Rai 2. In December 2011, she featured on talk show Kalispéra! along with television presenters Pamela Prati and Alfonso Signorini; aired on Canale 5. Throughout 2011, Satta was selected as the testimonial and commercials endorser of different multi-national brands such as Nike and Nicole (luxury fashion and jewelry company of Nicole Miller).

In May 2012, Satta featured on television program Punto su di te! presented with Elisa Isoardi; aired on Rai 1. Throughout 2012 and into 2013, Satta filmed episodes of Intitolata Amici a letto sitcom by Comedy Central Italy subdivision Comedy Central.

In September 2013, Satta and Rafael Benítez, the then manager of Italian giants S.S.C. Napoli, were appointed as presenters of Italy sports program TikiTaka on Italia 1, Mediaset Italia.

== Personal life ==
Between 2003 and 2006, Satta was in a relationship with Italian television personality Daniele Interrante.

Between 2006 and 2011, Satta was in a relationship with Italian footballer Christian Vieri. In April 2011, their relationship ended because of his alleged infidelity with Sara Tommasi.

In September 2011, Satta got engaged to 45-year-old Italian businessman Gianluca Vacchi.

In October 2011, Satta was photographed entering a hotel late at night with American basketball player Kobe Bryant, and leaving early in the morning. Satta's alleged affair with Bryant apparently led to Vanessa Bryant filing for divorce.

In November 2011, Satta began a relationship with footballer Kevin-Prince Boateng; the pair soon became engaged. In April 2014, Satta had a child with her fiancé, called 'Maddox Prince', then in June 2016, they married. The pair separated in January 2019, before reuniting later that year. In December 2020, they announced their divorce on social media.

== Filmography ==
Film
| Year | Film | Role | Notes |
|---|---|---|---|
| 2007 | Judge Mastrangelo 2 | Cameo | Directed by Henry Oldoini – Miniseries TV |
| 2007 | Bastardi | Cameo | Italian film directed by Federico Del Zoppo and Andres Alce Meldonado |
Television
| Year | Title | Role | Notes |
| 2005 | Mio fratello è Pakistano (My brother is) | Herself | Television program broadcast by Canale 5 |
| 2005–2008 | Striscia la notizia (The news) | Presenter | 2005–2008, vellum, Canale 5 |
| 2007 | TRL (Italy) | Presenter | Italian version of the MTV Television reality program |
| 2007 | White Party Fashion TV | Presenter | Fashion TV |
| 2008 | First and last | Presenter | Italian TV program on Italy 1, presented with Teo Mammucari |
| 2009–2010 | Controcampo (TV) | Presenter | Italian Television talk show on Rete 4, presented with Alberto Brandi |
| 2010 | Uno scandalo al sole (A scandal in the sun) | Presenter | |
| 2011 | Fenomenal | Guest | Italian TV program on Italy 1, presented by Teo Mammucari |
| 2011 | Let me sing! | Guest | |
| 2011 | Insideout, Pazzi per la scienza | Presenter | Presenter of the Italian version of BBC Two's "Crazy for science" |
| 2011–2012 | Kalispera | Presenter | Italian TV program on Canale 5, presented with Alfonso Signorini |
| 2012 | Punto su di te! | Presenter | Italian TV program on Rai 1, presented with Elisa Isoardi |
| 2012–2013 | Intitolata Amici a letto (Friends in bed) | Herself | Italian Sitcom TV program on Comedy Central Italy/Comedy Central, starred with Omar Fantini |
| 2013–2014 | TikiTaka | Presenter | Italian TV sports program on Italia 1/Mediaset Italia, Mediaset, presented with Pierluigi Pardo |
Advertisement
| Year | Title | Role | Notes |
| 2009 | Peugeot | Herself | Advertisement for Peugeot's 107 Petite plague |
