= Inside Outside =

Inside outside may refer to:

- Inside–outside algorithm, a way of re-estimating production probabilities in a probabilistic context-free grammar
- Inside/outside, a model of political reform
- Inside–outside test, a test used in computer graphics to determine if a point is inside or outside of a polygon
- Inside Outside (Petra Blaisse), a design firm founded by Dutch designer Petra Blaisse in 1991

== Books ==
- Inside Outside (novel), a 1964 fantasy novel written by Philip José Farmer
- Inside, Outside, a 1985 historical novel by Herman Wouk

== Music ==
- "Inside Outside" (Delirious? song), a 2004 single by Delirious?, from their album World Service
- "Inside Outside" (Sophie Monk song), a 2002 single by Sophie Monk, from her debut album Calendar Girl
- "Inside, Outside" (The Grates song), a 2006 song by The Grates from their debut album Gravity Won't Get You High
- "Inside to Outside", a 1986 song by Limahl later covered in 1999 by Italian singer Lady Violet
- "Inside Outside", song by Keb Mo from The Reflection
- Inside/Outside, a 2019 album by Cook Craig released under the moniker Pipe-Eye

== See also ==
- Outside Inside (disambiguation)
