= Tyrone Werts =

American man convicted of murder

Tyrone Werts is an American man who was convicted of a second-degree murder committed in 1975, for which he received a life sentence; however, he was released after 36 years instead. This was an extremely rare case as the law in Pennsylvania says that for those convicted of 1st or 2nd degree murder and given a life sentence, there is no possibility for parole (Gottschalk). He is most known as an ex-convict who was released from prison after serving 36 years of what was supposed to be a life sentence. While serving his time at Graterford Prison, in Perkiomen, Pennsylvania, Werts served as the president of the "Lifers" and made many very influential and positive changes in the prison community.

== Early life ==
Werts was born and raised In North Philadelphia, Pennsylvania. He grew up in a two-parent household and was one of nine children (Fiedler).

=== Criminal Past ===
Werts was given a life sentence in 1975 and was charged with being an accomplice to a second-degree murder. The crime took place in 1972, when Werts was 24 years old. It started out to be what he thought was a robbery. Werts had decided to stay in the car, which was parked two blocks from the scene of the crime. He acted as the getaway driver after the other men involved in the crime had murdered a man named William Bridgeman when the robbery went wrong. The crime took place at 31st and Arizona Street in Northern Philadelphia. Because of his knowledge of the crime and his knowledge that his friends were carrying weapons, Werts was charged with second-degree murder (Fiedler). He was offered a plea deal of an eight to twenty-year sentence but he refused the deal (Rubino) because he felt he was not guilty and that he could beat the case (Fiedler). He says that he was young and did not have adequate understanding of the law at the time. Instead Werts was charged with second-degree murder and received a life sentence without the possibility of parole, to be served at Graterford Prison in Perkiomen, Pennsylvania (Fiedler). Through his time in prison, Werts created programs and mentored other inmates in order to reduce crime rate and allow those who have a second chance at life to take advantage of the opportunity. Because of his work and good standing while at Graterford, Governor Ed Rendell commuted Werts' life sentence on December 30, 2010. He was released with two other men, William Fultz and Keith Smith. The three were sent to live in a halfway house near Eight and Callowhill in Philadelphia, where they were constantly checked on, had a curfew, and were randomly drug tested and breathalyzed. After a year of living there and following the rules, they were allowed to live independently but are on parole for the rest of their lives. With one parole violation, Werts can be sent back to prison at any time (Rubino).

=== Accomplishments While Serving Time ===
Werts spent 36 years behind bars at the Pennsylvania State Correctional Institution at Graterford. When he entered the prison he was a high school dropout. While in prison he worked on his high school degree and even left prison with a college degree of Bachelor of Arts from Villanova University (Mauer, King and Young). He spent time tutoring and mentoring other inmates and became known as a leader within the prison. He established The Lifers' Public Safety Initiative, which is a crime prevention program. His largest achievement was his development of The Inside-Out Prison Exchange Program. The program was developed by Lori Pompa in 1997 at Temple University in Philadelphia, Pennsylvania. Werts was most influential in bringing the Inside Out Program to Graterford Prison, where he was serving his time. The program brings together people who are behind bars and college students and has them learn within the same classroom. It encourages them to examine social issues such as crime, justice, freedom, inequality, and more. The hope is that as peers, the two populations from different worlds can share their thoughts on each matter and gain a better understanding of each issue. He was a long-term member of Graterford's Think Tank, which was the main group that developed the Inside Out Program and made it become nationwide (Davis and Roswell). The program has been known for having great success rates as far as intellectual development between both the students and the inmates participating in the program. It now exists in 20 states and has been implemented into 37 schools.

=== Post-Prison Life ===
Werts has continued his work with the Inside-Out Program since he was released from prison. Immediately after being released he began doing consulting work for the program. Also soon after his release The Defender Association of Philadelphia hired him as a consultant. Because of his work with decreasing crime rates among those released from prison while serving his own time, he was well known throughout Philadelphia and luckily was able to get his life started quickly after being released (Rubino). Though, he quickly noticed many changes that had occurred throughout the city of Philadelphia while he was serving his time. There were many new buildings and landscapes but most important was the invention of the cell phone. His adaption to society was a huge change but he is currently working hard to stay focused on the same changes that he was working towards while serving time. He speaks at college campuses and other places about crime prevention and shares his story with people in hopes that it will inspire change in both the law and in our society.

=== Interviews ===
- Tyrone Werts interviewed on Conversations from Penn State
