= Street Symphony =

Street Symphony may refer to:

- Street Symphony (producer), American music producer
- "Street Symphony" (song), 1999 song by Monica
