= Insider =

Insider(s) or The Insider(s) may refer to:

== Arts, entertainment, and media ==
=== Comics ===
- Insiders, a comic series by Mark Millar and Paul Grist, published in Crisis
- The Insiders, a team of DC Comics characters in the Brainiac stories
- Insiders (Dargaud), a French graphic novel series by Jean-Claude Bartoll, published by Dargaud

=== Literature ===
- The Insider (Latynina novel), a 1999 novel by Russian author Yulia Latynina
- The Insider (Rao novel), a 1998 roman à clef by former Indian Prime Minister P. V. Narasimha Rao
- The Insider, a 1999 novel by American author Stephen Frey
- The Insider: The Private Diaries of a Scandalous Decade, a 2005 book by British media personality Piers Morgan

=== Music ===
- "Insider", a song from Tom Petty & The Heartbreakers' 1981 album Hard Promises
- Insiders (band), a Chicago-based rock band active in the 1980s and 1990s
- Insider (album), a 2006 album by Manchester alternative rock band Amplifier

=== Periodicals ===
- The Insider (website), an independent Russia-focused online newspaper
- The Insider (newsletter), a newsletter reporting on Pennsylvania politics
- The Insider, a magazine published by The Heritage Foundation
- Business Insider, a business news website owned by Insider, Inc.
  - Insider, Inc., an online media company known for publishing Insider, Business Insider, and other media websites

=== Television ===
==== Series ====
- Insider (Philippine TV program), a 2012 Philippine documentary and investigative program that aired on News5
- Insiders (Australian TV program), an Australian news and politics analysis television program that debuted on ABC in 2001
- Insiders (British TV series), a 1997 British television drama series
- ABS-CBN Insider, a 2003 Philippine news program
- The Insider (TV program), a 2004–2017 American tabloid reality television news program that aired in syndication
- The Insiders (TV series), a 1985—1986 American television detective series
- The Insiders, a South Korean web cartoon by Yoon Tae-ho
- Insiders (Spanish TV series), a Spanish reality television series
- Insider (South Korean TV series), a 2022 television series

==== Episodes ====
- "The Insider" (Law & Order: Criminal Intent), 2002
- "The Insider" (NCIS: New Orleans), 2015
- "Insiders" (Stargate SG-1), 2006

=== Other uses in arts, entertainment, and media ===
- IGN Insider, a subscription web service later renamed IGN Prime
- Insider Inc., an American online media company
- The Insider (film), a 1999 drama about a 60 Minutes exposé of the tobacco industry

== Computing and technology ==
- Intel Insider, a form of digital copy protection and digital rights management for integrated graphics processors
- Windows Insider, an open software testing program from Microsoft

== Other uses ==
- The Insiders (professional wrestling), a WCW tag team of Diamond Dallas Page and Kevin Nash
- Insider trading, trading of a public company's stock or other securities based on material, nonpublic information; illegal in various countries.

== See also ==
- Inside (disambiguation)
