= Coco Donuts =

Chain of doughnut shops in Portland, Oregon, U.S.

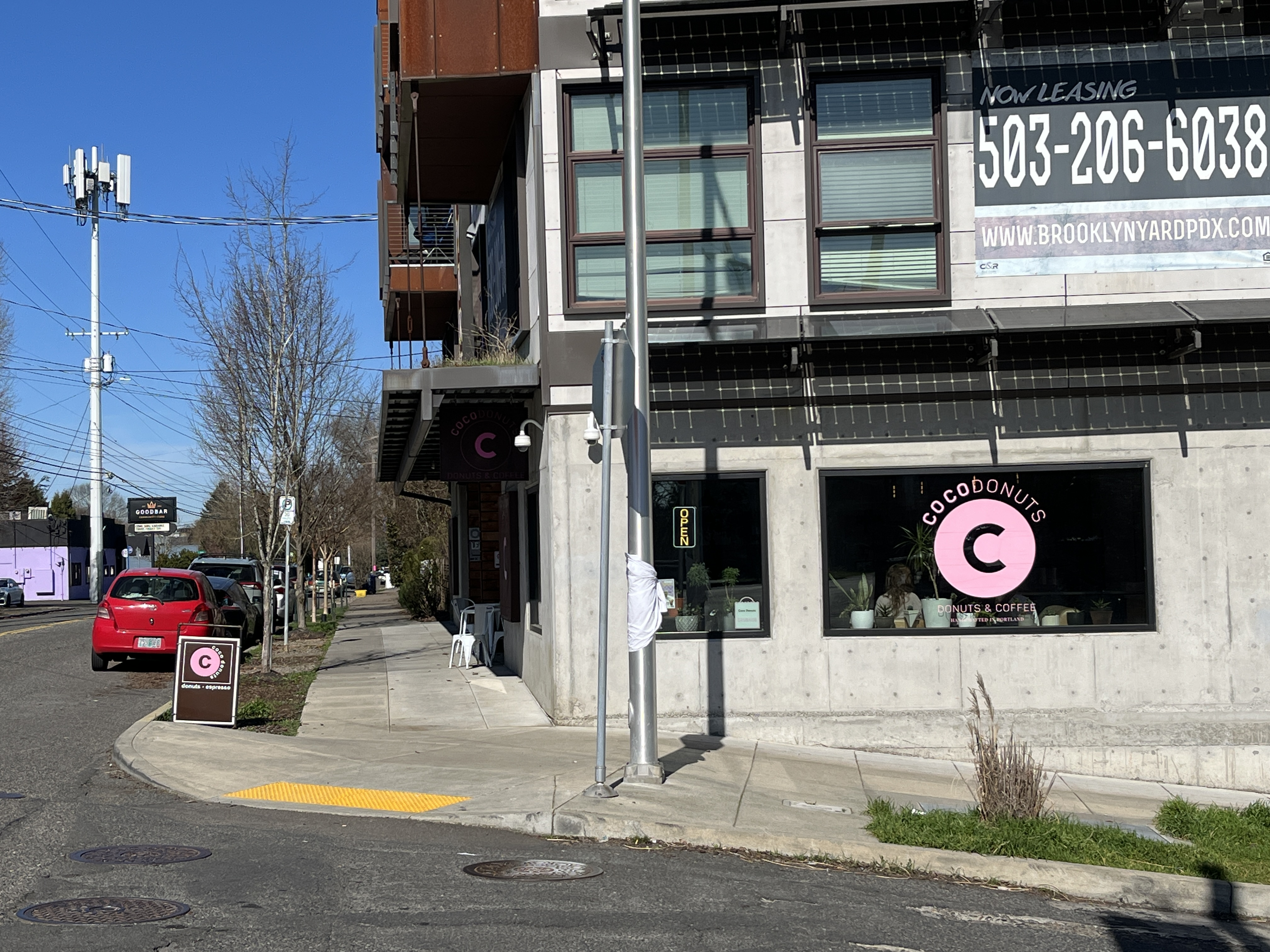
- Exterior of a shop in southeast Portland, 2025

Restaurant information
- Owners: Ian Christopher; Thevy Hul; Prak Khou
- Location: Portland, Multnomah, Oregon, United States

Coco Donuts is a small chain of doughnut shops based in Portland, Oregon, United States. There are seven locations, as of 2023. Owned by Ian Christopher, Thevy Hul, and Prak Khou, the business has garnered a positive reception.

== Description ==
The small chain Coco Donuts operates multiple locations in the Portland metropolitan area, and uses dough based on a family recipe. Doughnut varieties include: buttermilk bars, chocolate icing, jelly-filled, lavender, and mochi with flavors like matcha and Oreo. Coco's signature doughnut is a raised chocolate, glazed and topped with chocolate-covered coffee beans and cacao. In 2017, KATU described Coco as "the only donut shop in Portland crafting both quality donuts and coffee".

== History ==
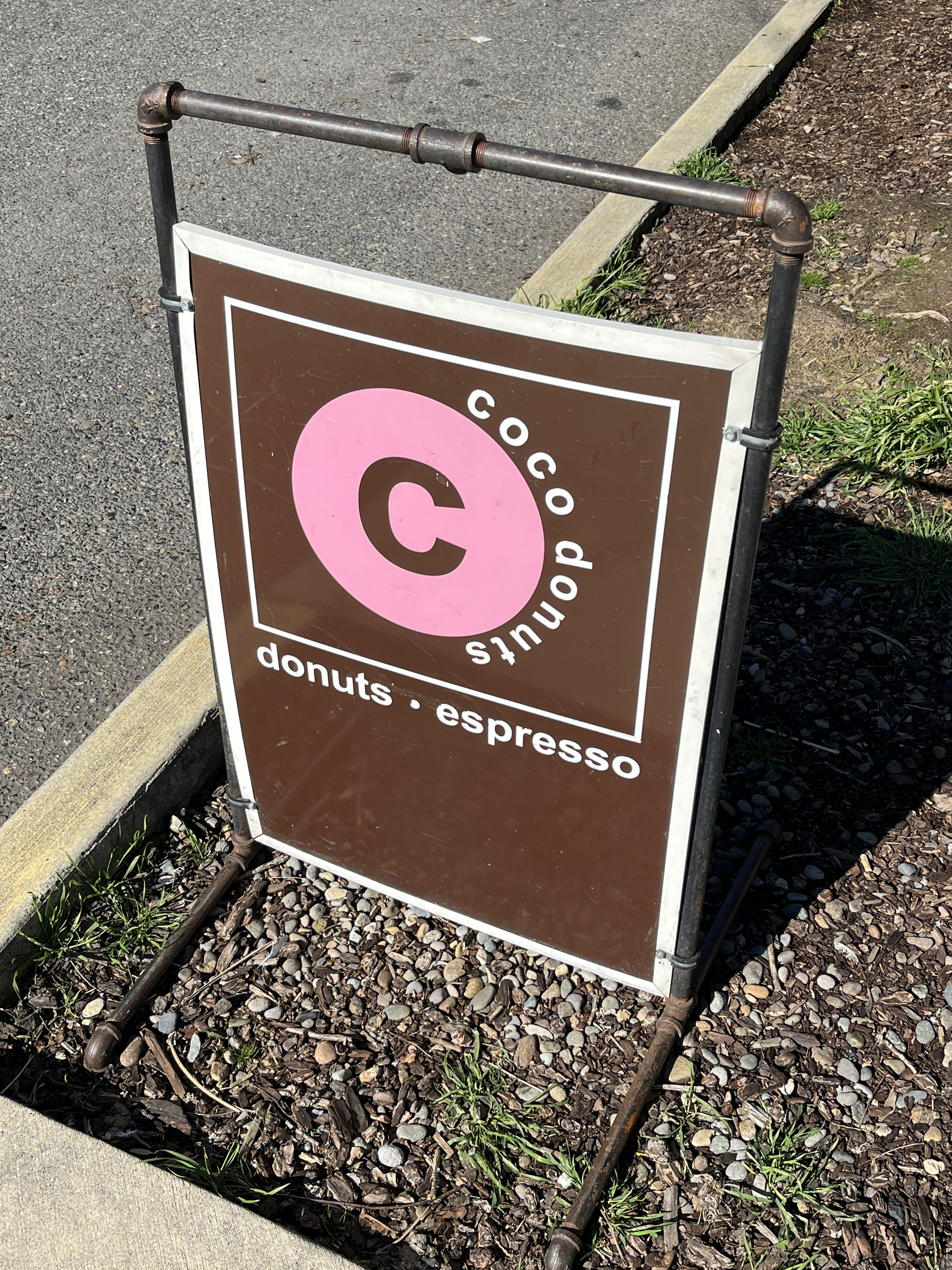
Sidewalk sign, 2025

The business is owned by Ian Christopher, Thevy Hul, and Prak Khou. Coco has donated surplus food to Outside In and has participated in Too Good To Go, an app that connects customers to restaurants and stores with surplus unsold food. There are seven locations in the Portland metropolitan area, including six in Portland and one in Clackamas:

- Uptown: on 17th Avenue, Southwest Portland
- Downtown: on 6th Avenue in Southwest Portland
- Broadway: on Broadway in Northeast Portland
- Williams: on Skidmore Street in North Portland (fourth location, opened in 2016)
- Brooklyn: on Milwaukie Avenue in Southeast Portland (fifth location, opened in 2017)
- Portland State University: on Broadway in Southwest Portland
- Sunnyside: on Sunnyside Road in Clackamas

== Reception ==
Time Out Portland included Coco in a 2019 list of the city's twelve best doughnuts. In his 2021 overview of Portland's best doughnuts, Alex Frane of Thrillist said the business "takes the traditional approach to donut shops and elevates it without losing sight of the roots". Coco was included in Bon Appétit's 2023 list of Portland's eight best doughnuts and Eater Portland's 2024 overview of the city's "most delicious" doughnuts. Portland Monthly has said, "Coco Donuts excels at the classics. Raised. Cake. Jelly-filled. You won't find fancy glazes or gimmicky shapes here, just a killer apple fritter and fresh, house-roasted coffee."

== See also ==
- List of doughnut shops
