= Street Symphony (song) =

Single by Monica

from the album The Boy Is Mine
- Released: May 31, 1999
- Length: 5:36 (album version); 4:04 (radio edit)
- Label: Arista
- Songwriter: Dallas Austin
- Producer: Dallas Austin

Monica singles chronology
"Angel of Mine" (1998)	"Street Symphony" (1999)	"Right Here Waiting" (1999)

Music video
- "Street Symphony" on YouTube

"Street Symphony" is a song by American R&B singer Monica. It was written and produced by Dallas Austin for her second studio album, The Boy Is Mine (1998), featuring an orchestral background performed by the Atlanta Symphony Orchestra. The song was released as the album's fourth single in May 1999. It peaked at number two on the US Billboard Bubbling Under R&B/Hip-Hop Singles chart and number 20 on the Billboard Bubbling Under Hot 100 chart. "Street Symphony"'s accompanying video was directed by Darren Grant.

== Background ==
"Street Symphony" was written and produced by Dallas Austin. A tale of a street hustler whose girlfriend begs him to change his lifestyle, Austin utilized the dynamics of the Atlanta Symphony Orchestra inside the studio to record the song.

== Critical reception ==
"Street Symphony" was positively received by Chuck Taylor of Billboard. He wrote: "Garnished with carnival-like instrumental touches and a gorgeous orchestral passage — and yet maintaining an overall contemporary- R&B shuffle quality — "Street Symphony" absolutely scores on all levels, from its instantaneous chorus and Monica's cool, soul-searching vocal to creative production props and juicy verses about a man gone wrong, all masterminded by songwriter/producer Dallas [...] This is one of those songs that tempers the hot summer air, providing a backdrop for a romantic outing under the stars." In 2009, Tyler Lewis from PopMatters called "Street Symphony" Monica's "single greatest work to date."

== Music video ==
A music video for "Street Symphony" was directed by Darren Grant. It takes place at night in downtown Atlanta, Georgia. In the video, Monica is seen wearing several dark outfits whilst singing and dancing through different sections of the song. Included are cuts of Monica and her female back-up dancers performing choreography in black leather costumes, with choreographed string players (violins and violas) in similarly dark clothing. The video is mainly composed of dark greys and blues despite black being a recurring color, presumably to go with the song's emotional, somewhat bitter (yet mildly hopeful) subject matter.

The plot follows Monica's romance, and her decision to leave a lover involved in unspecified criminal activity. In the opening scenes, there are flashing police lights as police arrest a purposely edited/obscured man. Then, in a scene meant to have taken place hours earlier inside of a luxury apartment, we see Monica modeling and admiring various diamonds and jewels (presumably stolen property, given as gifts by her lover). During this scene, she sings about loving him much more than any ill-gotten luxury. Next we see Monica as the passenger in a car with her love driving, when he decides to make a quick “stop”. Whether or not this is meant to portray the dealing of illicit substances, pimping, gambling, fraud, or theft, it is never specified. All we see is the exchange of money. The two men walk off towards a dark place, which is revealed to be a parking garage, leaving Monica visibly distraught and alone in the car. She begins to realize there is no changing her love's criminal ways. Back at the apartment, Monica tosses the same diamond jewels (that she previously admired) across the room. Then she departs, alone, with a defiant and determined swagger. Once outside, she spots the police car lights driving in the direction of her now ex-lover. He is arrested; Monica continues on her path.

== Track listings ==
Australian CD single
No.	Title	Writer(s)	Producer(s)	Length
1.	"Street Symphony" (Radio Edit)	Dallas Austin	Austin	4:04
2.	"Right Here Waiting" (featuring 112)	Richard Marx	David Foster; Tony Maserati^{[a]}	4:31
3.	"Street Symphony" (Extended Version featuring Majic)	Austin	Austin	5:15
4.	"Inside" (Masters at Work Club Mix)	Diane Warren	Foster; "Little" Louie Vega^{[b]}; Kenny "Dope" Gonzalez^{[b]}	8:18
5.	"Street Symphony" (Cyptron Zone III Remix)	Austin; Gary White	Austin	4:17

Remix single
No.	Title	Writer(s)	Producer(s)	Length
1.	"Street Symphony" (Cyptron Zone III Remix) (Radio Mix featuring Big Gipp, JT Money & Majic)	Austin	Austin	4:15
2.	"Street Symphony" (Cyptron Zone III Remix) (Instrumental)	Austin	Austin	4:16
3.	"Street Symphony" (Cyptron Zone III Remix) (Call Out Research Hook)	Austin	Austin	0:10

Notes

- ^{^[a]} denotes co-producer(s)
- ^{^[b]} denotes remix producer(s)

== Credits and personnel ==
Credits are adapted from the liner notes of The Boy Is Mine.

- Atlanta Symphony Orchestra – orchestral performance
- Monica Arnold – vocals
- Dallas Austin – production, arrangement, music
- A. Baars – engineering
- Leslie Brathwaite – engineering, mixing
- Greg Crawford – engineering
- Eddie Horst – orchestral arrangements
- Ty Hudson – assistant engineering
- Debra Killings – background vocals
- Rico Lumpkin – engineering
- Andrew Lyn – assistant engineering
- Carlton Lynn – engineering, assistant engineering
- Vernon Mungo – assistant engineering
- Claudine Pontier – assistant engineering
- Rick Sheppard – midi and sound design
- Kimberly Smith – production coordination
- Gary White – music

== Charts ==
Weekly chart performance for "Street Symphony"
Chart (1999)	Peak position
US Bubbling Under Hot 100 (Billboard)	20
US Rhythmic Airplay (Billboard)	27
US Hot R&B/Hip-Hop Songs (Billboard)	50

== Release history ==
Release dates and formats for "Street Symphony"
Region	Date	Format	Label	Ref.
United States	May 31, 1999	Urban radio	Arista	
United States	June 15, 1999	Rhythmic contemporary radio	Arista	
United States	July 12, 1999	Contemporary hit radio	Arista	
