= Gone Be Fine =

Promotional single by Monica featuring OutKast

from the album The Boy Is Mine
- Released: December 1999
- Recorded: 1997–1999
- Genre: R&B; hip hop
- Length: 4:17
- Label: Arista
- Songwriter: Dallas Austin
- Producer: Dallas Austin

"Gone Be Fine" is an R&B song written by producer Dallas Austin for Monica's second studio album, The Boy Is Mine (1998). Although not released as an official single, the song was released as a promotional recording to radio stations and peaked at number five on the Billboard Bubbling Under R&B/Hip-Hop Singles on October 23, 1998. It features guest vocals by rap group OutKast.

== Track listing ==
1. "Gone Be Fine" (Radio Mix)
2. "Gone Be Fine" (Instrument)
3. "Gone Be Fine" (Call Out Hook)

== Charts ==
Chart performance for "Gone Be Fine"
Chart (1999)	Peak position
US Bubbling Under R&B/Hip-Hop Singles (Billboard)	5
