= List of Billboard Hot 100 number ones of 1998 =

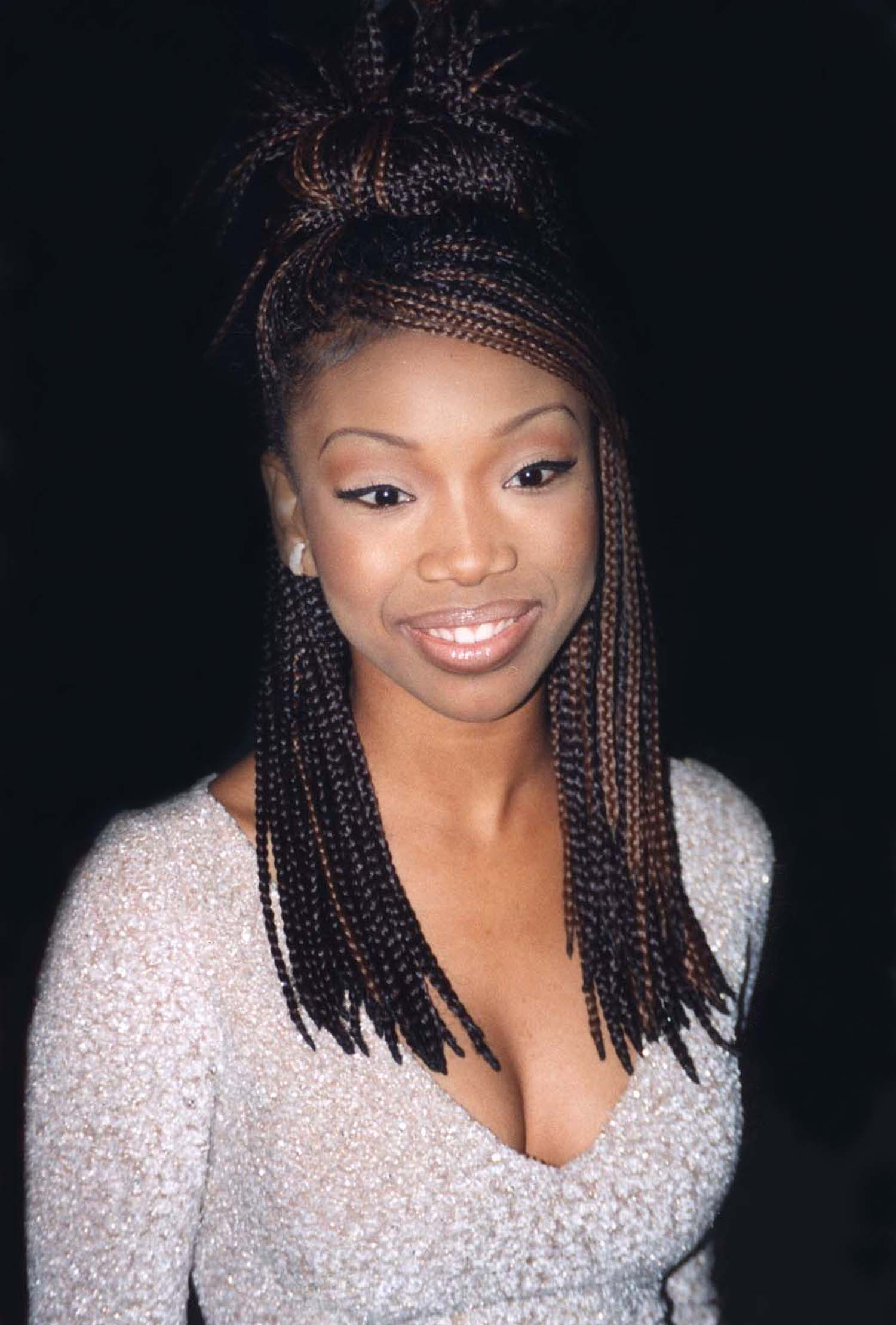
Brandy's (pictured) "The Boy Is Mine" (a duet with Monica) is the longest-running hit single of 1998, topping the Hot 100 for thirteen consecutive weeks.

The Billboard Hot 100 is a chart that ranks the best-performing singles of the United States. Published by Billboard magazine, the data are compiled by Nielsen SoundScan based collectively on each single's weekly physical sales and airplay. In 1998, there were 16 singles that topped the chart, in 52 issue dates.

During the year, 10 acts had achieved a first U.S. number-one single, namely: Savage Garden, Usher, Will Smith, Next, Brandy, Monica, Aerosmith, Barenaked Ladies, Lauryn Hill, and Divine. R&B singer Monica and pop singer Céline Dion both had two number-one singles in 1998.

Brandy and Monica's "The Boy Is Mine" is the longest-running single of the year, staying at number one for thirteen consecutive weeks. Other singles that had a multiple chart run includes Monica's "The First Night" with five weeks atop and Next's "Too Close", Aerosmith's "I Don't Want to Miss a Thing" and R. Kelly's "I'm Your Angel" (featuring Céline Dion) with four weeks (the latter spending two additional weeks at number one in 1999).

== Chart history ==
Key
†	Indicates best-performing single of 1998

No.	Issue date	Song	Artist(s)	Ref.
821	January 3	"Candle in the Wind 1997" / "Something About the Way You Look Tonight"	Elton John	
821	January 10	"Candle in the Wind 1997" / "Something About the Way You Look Tonight"	Elton John	
822	January 17	"Truly Madly Deeply"	Savage Garden	
822	January 24	"Truly Madly Deeply"	Savage Garden	
823	January 31	"Together Again"	Janet Jackson	
823	February 7	"Together Again"	Janet Jackson	
824	February 14	"Nice & Slow"	Usher	
824	February 21	"Nice & Slow"	Usher	
825	February 28	"My Heart Will Go On"	Céline Dion	
825	March 7	"My Heart Will Go On"	Céline Dion	
826	March 14	"Gettin' Jiggy wit It"	Will Smith	
826	March 21	"Gettin' Jiggy wit It"	Will Smith	
826	March 28	"Gettin' Jiggy wit It"	Will Smith	
827	April 4	"All My Life"	K-Ci & JoJo	
827	April 11	"All My Life"	K-Ci & JoJo	
827	April 18	"All My Life"	K-Ci & JoJo	
828	April 25	"Too Close"	Next	
828	May 2	"Too Close"	Next	
828	May 9	"Too Close"	Next	
828	May 16	"Too Close"	Next	
829	May 23	"My All"	Mariah Carey	
re	May 30	"Too Close"	Next	
830	June 6	"The Boy Is Mine"	Brandy and Monica	
830	June 13	"The Boy Is Mine"	Brandy and Monica	
830	June 20	"The Boy Is Mine"	Brandy and Monica	
830	June 27	"The Boy Is Mine"	Brandy and Monica	
830	July 4	"The Boy Is Mine"	Brandy and Monica	
830	July 11	"The Boy Is Mine"	Brandy and Monica	
830	July 18	"The Boy Is Mine"	Brandy and Monica	
830	July 25	"The Boy Is Mine"	Brandy and Monica	
830	August 1	"The Boy Is Mine"	Brandy and Monica	
830	August 8	"The Boy Is Mine"	Brandy and Monica	
830	August 15	"The Boy Is Mine"	Brandy and Monica	
830	August 22	"The Boy Is Mine"	Brandy and Monica	
830	August 29	"The Boy Is Mine"	Brandy and Monica	
831	September 5	"I Don't Want to Miss a Thing"	Aerosmith	
831	September 12	"I Don't Want to Miss a Thing"	Aerosmith	
831	September 19	"I Don't Want to Miss a Thing"	Aerosmith	
831	September 26	"I Don't Want to Miss a Thing"	Aerosmith	
832	October 3	"The First Night"	Monica	
832	October 10	"The First Night"	Monica	
833	October 17	"One Week"	Barenaked Ladies	
re	October 24	"The First Night"	Monica	
re	October 31	"The First Night"	Monica	
re	November 7	"The First Night"	Monica	
834	November 14	"Doo Wop (That Thing)"	Lauryn Hill	
834	November 21	"Doo Wop (That Thing)"	Lauryn Hill	
835	November 28	"Lately"	Divine	
The Billboard Hot 100 updates its chart formula to include airplay-only songs that never had a commercial single release.
836	December 5	"I'm Your Angel"	R. Kelly and Céline Dion	
836	December 12	"I'm Your Angel"	R. Kelly and Céline Dion	
836	December 19	"I'm Your Angel"	R. Kelly and Céline Dion	
836	December 26	"I'm Your Angel"	R. Kelly and Céline Dion	

== Number-one artists ==
List of number-one artists by total weeks at number one
Position	Artist	Weeks at No. 1
1	Monica	18
2	Brandy	13
3	Céline Dion	6
4	Next	5
5	Aerosmith	4
5	R. Kelly	4
7	Will Smith	3
7	K-Ci & JoJo	3
9	Elton John	2
9	Savage Garden	2
9	Janet Jackson	2
9	Usher	2
9	Lauryn Hill	2
8	Mariah Carey	1
8	Barenaked Ladies	1
8	Divine	1

== See also ==
- 1998 in music
- List of Billboard number-one singles
- List of Billboard Hot 100 number-one singles of the 1990s

== Additional sources ==
- Fred Bronson's Billboard Book of Number 1 Hits, 5th Edition (ISBN 0-8230-7677-6)
- Joel Whitburn's Top Pop Singles 1955-2008, 12 Edition (ISBN 0-89820-180-2)
- Joel Whitburn Presents the Billboard Hot 100 Charts: The Nineties (ISBN 0-89820-137-3)
- Additional information obtained can be verified within Billboard's online archive services and print editions of the magazine.
