= The First Night =

1998 single by Monica

Single by Monica

from the album The Boy Is Mine
- B-side: "'Cross the Room"
- Released: July 28, 1998
- Length: 3:55
- Label: Arista
- Songwriters: Jermaine Dupri; Tamara Savage; Marilyn McLeod; Pam Sawyer
- Producer: Jermaine Dupri

Monica singles chronology
"The Boy Is Mine" (1998)	"The First Night" (1998)	"Angel of Mine" (1998)

Music video
- "The First Night" on YouTube

"The First Night" is a song by American singer Monica for her second studio album, The Boy Is Mine (1998). It was written by Tamara Savage and Jermaine Dupri, featuring production and additional vocals from the latter. Built around a sample of Diana Ross's 1976 recording "Love Hangover", penned by Marilyn McLeod and Pam Sawyer, who share co-writing credits, the song is about the protagonist's battle with sexual temptations on the night of her first date, despite her conflicting emotions and strong sexual desires.

Following the major commercial chart success of previous single "The Boy Is Mine", a duet with fellow R&B singer Brandy, "The First Night" song was released on July 28, 1998, as the album's second single by Arista Records. Upon its commercial release, it emerged as Monica's second consecutive chart topper, topping both the US Billboard Hot 100 and the component Hot R&B Singles chart, becoming her first Hot 100 number one (and third R&B number one) as a solo artist. A remix version with producer Dupri, and rapper Da Brat appeared as a bonus track on Monica's 1998 CD single, "Angel of Mine".

== Background and development ==
"The First Night" was written by Tamara Savage and Jermaine Dupri, and production was handled by the latter. In the mid-1990s, Savage, a USC alumna and musical performer, signed a development deal with EMI while she was still in college. In 1997, her mentor, Big Jon Platt, then Senior Vice President of Creative at EMI Music Publishing, started setting up collaborations between her and EMI writers such as Soulshock & Karlin and Jermaine Dupri. EMI flew Savage to Atlanta to co-write a song with Dupri for the South Park: Bigger, Longer & Uncut soundtrack, which was expected to be recorded by singer Janet Jackson, but when Savage began working with Dupri, they decided to focus first on writing a song for Monica, which resulted in "The First Night".

The song samples the dark, bassy piano chords intro section from American singer Diana Ross's "Love Hangover" (1976). Due to its sampling, "Love Hangover" writers Marilyn McLeod and Pam Sawyer are credited as co-writers. Recording of "The First Night" took place at the Krosswire Studios in Atlanta, and mixing was overseen by Phil Tan and Dupri at the Silent Sound Studios. Dupri performs several ad-libs on "The First Night" but is not placed as a featured artist on the track. Monica commented about the song in a 1998 interview with MTV News: "'The First Night' is not an experience of mine, but it's a record that Jermaine Dupri produced, and of whom I've known a long time...It is basically about a guy making an approach towards a woman on the first date."

== Critical reception ==
In his review of the song, Larry Flick from Billboard described the song as a "sleek soul shuffler" and praised Monica for not rushing "to swap her youth for adult props". Overall, he thought the song was "smarter than your average pop hit" and called it a winner that would dominate radio playlists. Tony Farsides from Music Week felt that the song "is quite downbeat but builds momentum of its own through Dupri's cameo raps and Monica's own impressive vocals." In 2020 the song was ranked at number 108 on Cleveland.com's Every No. 1 song of the 1990s ranked from worst to best list. Writer Troy L. Smith said, "Listening to it now, Monica’s “The First Night” may not feel like a song that topped the charts for a total of five weeks. But back in 1998, its hip-hop soul vibe fit right in with the times."

== Chart performance ==
"The First Night" became Monica's sixth top-10 entry and second consecutive number-one hit on the US Billboard Hot 100, reaching the top of the charts in the week of October 3, 1998. It replaced "I Don't Want to Miss a Thing" by Aerosmith which had held the top spot from September 5 to September 26, and followed Monica's first chart topper "The Boy Is Mine" (1998), her duet with Brandy. "The First Night" was replaced by Barenaked Ladies's "One Week" after two weeks at number one, only to reclaim the top of the chart for another three weeks in October 1998. On Billboard's component charts, it spent six weeks at number one on the Hot R&B Singles chart and became Monica's first entry on the Dance Club Play chart, also reaching the top spot.

Internationally, "The First Night" was less successful though it still ranks among Monica's highest and latest-charting singles to date. It reached top 10 of the singles charts in Canada, the United Kingdom, and Flanders, while entering the top 20 in New Zealand and the top 30 in Australia, Iceland, Ireland, the Netherlands, and Scotland, as well as on the Eurochart Hot 100. In the United Kingdom, the song became her second chart topper on the UK R&B Singles Singles. In Canada, it also peaked at number 15 on RPM's Urban Top 30 chart.

With sales in excess of 1.0 million copies and a 20 week-stay in the top 40 of the Billboard Hot 100, "The First Night" was certified platinum by the Recording Industry Association of America (RIAA). Billboard ranked it 18th on its Hot 100 year-end listing and 19th on its Hot R&B Singles year-end chart. In 1999, it finished 26 on Billboard's Hot 100 decade-end chart. In 2018, the magazine ranked it 361th on its 60th Anniversary all-time chart.

== Music video ==
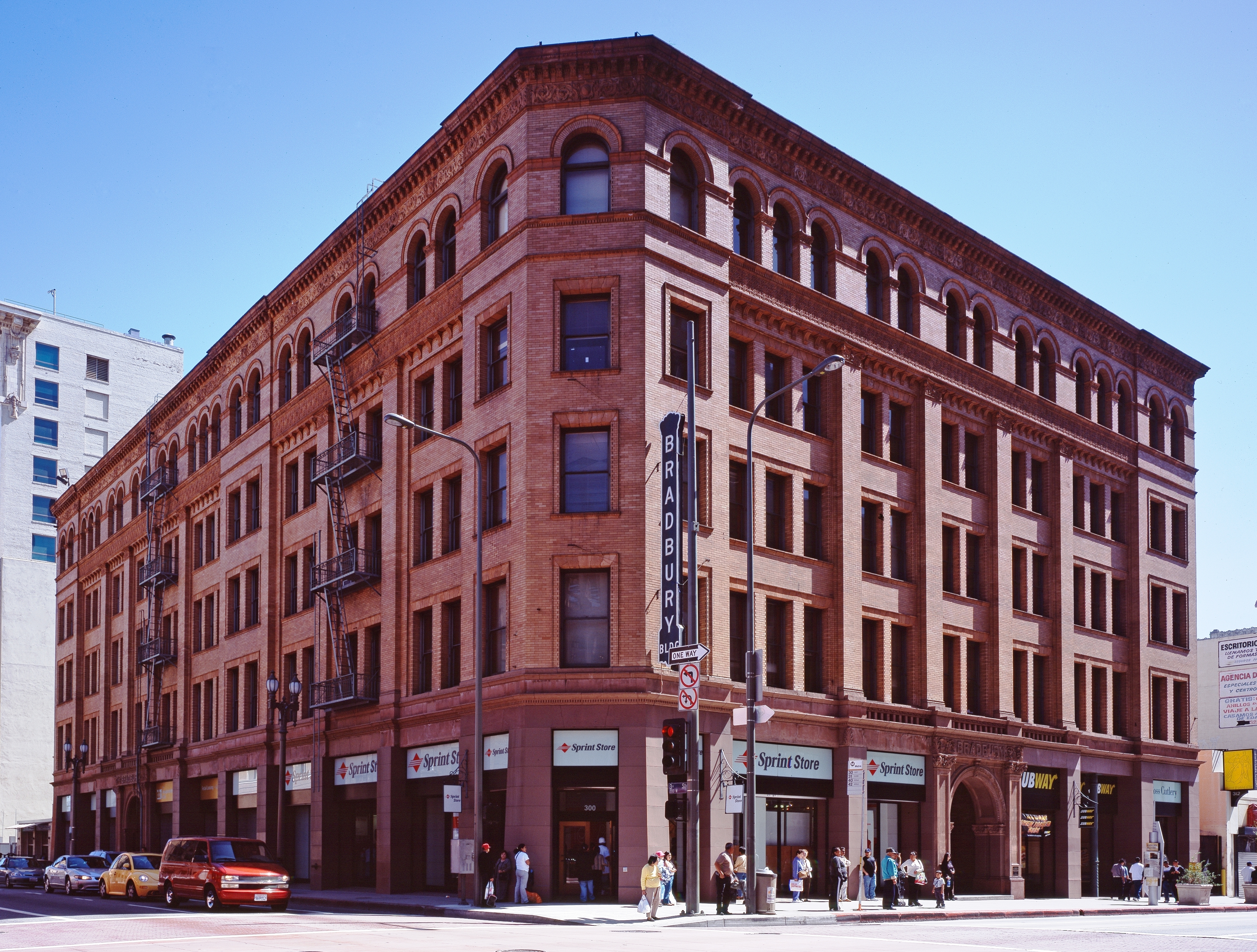
The music video for "The First Night" was filmed in the Bradbury Building in downtown Los Angeles.

Monica reteamed with "The Boy Is Mine" director Joseph Kahn to produce a music video for "The First Night." Filming took place in the Bradbury Building in downtown Los Angeles, California, a five-story office building that is best known for its extraordinary skylit atrium of access walkways, stairs and elevators, and their ornate ironwork.

In the video, Monica is seen dancing in a tight, white top and long khaki pants with a crowd of dancers. Throughout the video, there are cuts of her standing up in a white dress and sitting down on a long couch, holding golden opera glasses. Other cuts show groups of men and women as well as Monica and her love interest sitting on a couch. The instrumental break features breakdancing then cuts back to the dance with the crowd. The video ends with Monica rejecting her lover's kiss.

In 2017, Complex magazine included the video on its The Best R&B Videos of the '90s listing and wrote: "Monica isn't going to have sex with you right away, and her method of letting you will be elaborate. Hence, this video...The dance moves were cute, the concept was simple, and it all came together perfectly in front of the camera."

== Track listings ==
US and European CD single; US cassette single
No.	Title	Writer(s)	Producer(s)	Length
1.	"The First Night"	Jermaine Dupri; Tamara Savage; Marilyn McLeod; Pam Sawyer	Dupri	3:55
2.	"'Cross the Room"	Dallas Austin; Bill Curtis; Debra Killings	Austin	3:51

US maxi-CD and 12-inch single
No.	Title	Writer(s)	Producer(s)	Length
1.	"The First Night" (album version)	Dupri; Savage; McLeod; Sawyer	Dupri	3:55
2.	"The First Night" (instrumental)	Dupri; Savage; McLeod; Sawyer	Dupri	3:55
3.	"The First Night" (video version)	Dupri; Savage; McLeod; Sawyer	Dupri	3:55
4.	"'Cross the Room" (album version)	Austin; Curtis; Killings	Austin	3:51

UK CD single
No.	Title	Writer(s)	Producer(s)	Length
1.	"The First Night"	Dupri; Savage; McLeod; Sawyer	Dupri	3:55
2.	"Before You Walk Out of My Life"	Kenneth Karlin; Andrea Martin; Carsten Schack	Soulshock & Karlin	4:53
3.	"Like This and Like That" (featuring Mr. Malik)	Dallas Austin; Colin Wolfe; Malik Edwards	Austin; Wolfe	4:41

UK 12-inch single
No.	Title	Writer(s)	Producer(s)	Length
1.	"The First Night" (radio version)	Dupri; Savage; McLeod; Sawyer	Dupri	3:55
2.	"The First Night" (Jermaine Dupri remix featuring R.O.C.)	Dupri; Savage; McLeod; Sawyer	Dupri; Carl So-Lowe^{[a]}	4:09
3.	"The First Night" (Booker T. vocal remix)	Dupri; Savage; McLeod; Sawyer	Dupri; Booker T.^{[a]}	6:18
4.	"The First Night" (Booker T. dub mix)	Dupri; Savage; McLeod; Sawyer	Dupri; Booker T.^{[a]}	5:32

UK cassette single
No.	Title	Writer(s)	Producer(s)	Length
1.	"The First Night" (radio version)	Dupri; Savage; McLeod; Sawyer	Dupri	3:55
2.	"The First Night" (Booker T. vocal remix)	Dupri; Savage; McLeod; Sawyer	Dupri; Booker T.^{[a]}	6:18

Australian CD single
No.	Title	Writer(s)	Producer(s)	Length
1.	"The First Night" (album version)	Dupri; Savage; McLeod; Sawyer	Dupri	3:55
2.	"The First Night" (remix featuring Jermaine Dupri)	Dupri; Savage; McLeod; Sawyer	Dupri; So-Lowe^{[a]}	4:08
3.	"The First Night" (instrumental)	Dupri; Savage; McLeod; Sawyer	Dupri	3:52
4.	"The First Night" (video version)	Dupri; Savage; McLeod; Sawyer	Dupri	3:54

Notes

- ^{^[a]} denotes additional producer(s)
- "The First Night" contains a sample from Diana Ross' "Love Hangover" (1976).
- "'Cross the Room" contains a sample from The Fatback Band's "I Like Girls" (1980).
- "Like This and Like That" contains elements of Spoonie Gee's song "Spoonin' Rap" (1979).

== Personnel ==
Personnel are adapted from the liner notes of The Boy Is Mine.

- Monica Arnold – vocals
- Jermaine Dupri – mixing, production, writing
- Tamara Savage – writing
- Marilyn McLeod – writing ("Love Hangover")
- Pam Sawyer – writing ("Love Hangover")
- Brian Frye – recording
- Phil Tan – mixing

== Charts ==
=== Weekly charts ===
Weekly chart performance for "The First Night"
Chart (1998)	Peak position
Australia (ARIA)	30
Belgium (Ultratip Bubbling Under Flanders)	8
Belgium (Ultratop 50 Wallonia)	31
Canada (Nielsen SoundScan)	6
Canada Top Singles (RPM)	9
Canada Dance/Urban (RPM)	15
Europe (Eurochart Hot 100)	29
France (SNEP)	41
Germany (GfK)	63
Iceland (Íslenski Listinn Topp 40)	29
Ireland (IRMA)	30
Netherlands (Dutch Top 40)	24
Netherlands (Single Top 100)	22
New Zealand (Recorded Music NZ)	15
Scottish Singles Sales (Official Charts)	29
UK Singles (Official Charts)	6
UK Hip Hop/R&B (Official Charts)	1
US Billboard Hot 100	1
US Dance Club Songs (Billboard)	1
US Hot R&B/Hip-Hop Songs (Billboard)	1
US Pop Airplay (Billboard)	24
US Rhythmic Airplay (Billboard)	2

=== Year-end charts ===
1998 year-end chart performance for "The First Night"
Chart (1998)	Position
Canada Top Singles (RPM)	77
Netherlands (Dutch Top 40)	132
UK Singles (OCC)	168
UK Urban (Music Week)	18
US Billboard Hot 100	18
US Hot R&B Singles (Billboard)	19
US Mainstream Top 40 (Billboard)	90
US Rhythmic Top 40 (Billboard)	24

1999 year-end chart performance for "The First Night"
Chart (1999)	Position
US Hot R&B/Hip-Hop Singles & Tracks (Billboard)	100
US Rhythmic Top 40 (Billboard)	96

=== Decade-end charts ===
Decade-end chart performance for "The First Night"
Chart (1990–1999)	Position
US Billboard Hot 100	26

== Certifications ==
Certifications for "The First Night"
Region	Certification	Certified units/sales
United States (RIAA)	Platinum	1,500,000

== Release history ==
Release dates and formats for "The First Night"
Region	Date	Format(s)	Label(s)	Ref.
United States	July 14, 1998	Rhythmic contemporary; urban radio	Arista	
United States	July 28, 1998	Commercial	Arista	
United States	August 4, 1998	Contemporary hit radio	Arista	
United Kingdom	October 5, 1998	12-inch vinyl; CD; cassette	Arista; BMG	

== See also ==
- List of Hot 100 number-one singles of 1998 (U.S.)
- List of number-one R&B singles of 1998 (U.S.)
- List of number-one dance singles of 1998 (U.S.)
