= The Boy Is Mine (album) =

Studio album by Monica
- Released: July 14, 1998
- Genre: R&B
- Length: 57:49
- Label: Arista
- Producers: Clive Davis (exec.); Dallas Austin (also exec.); Leslie Brathwaite; Jermaine Dupri; David Foster; Rodney Jerkins; Tony Maserati; Brandy Norwood; Daryl Simmons; Dexter Simmons; Colin Wolfe

Monica chronology
Miss Thang (1995)	The Boy Is Mine (1998)	All Eyez on Me (2002)

Singles from The Boy Is Mine
- 1. "The Boy Is Mine" Released: May 4, 1998; 2. "The First Night" Released: July 28, 1998; 3. "Angel of Mine" Released: November 9, 1998; 4. "Street Symphony" Released: May 31, 1999; 5. "Right Here Waiting" Released: December 14, 1999

The Boy Is Mine is the second studio album by American singer Monica. It was released by Arista Records on July 14, 1998, in the United States. The album deviated from the formula of her debut Miss Thang (1995) as she had more creative control over the material she recorded; a step that she considered a "natural progression". On the record, Monica worked with a variety of producers and writers from different genres such as gospel, R&B, and hip hop, including frequent collaborators Dallas Austin, Colin Wolfe, and Daryl Simmons. Additional producers included David Foster, Diane Warren, Jermaine Dupri, and Rodney Jerkins and his Darkchild crew, some of which would become household names on subsequent albums.

Upon release, The Boy Is Mine received generally positive reviews from contemporary music critics, who appreciated the album's production quality and praised Monica's overall vocal performance. The album debuted at number eight on the Billboard 200 and at number two on the Top R&B Albums in August 1998. It was eventually certified triple-platinum by the Recording Industry Association of America (RIAA), denoting shipments of over three million copies throughout the country, with estimated sales of 2 million copies in the United States as of November 2014. Her biggest international seller to date, it became a moderate success outside the United States, peaking within the top twenty in France, Japan, the Netherlands, New Zealand, and Switzerland.

Five commercial singles were released from the album. Lead single "The Boy Is Mine", a duet with singer Brandy, became the best-selling song of the year in the United States, spending 13 weeks on top of the US Billboard Hot 100, while peaking at number one in Canada, the Netherlands and New Zealand. "The First Night" and "Angel of Mine", released as the album's second and third single respectively, also became chart toppers on Billboard Hot 100. The Boy Is Mine also spawned the fourth and fifth singles, "Street Symphony" and "Right Here Waiting", while also containing the hit single, "For You I Will", from the Space Jam soundtrack.

== Background ==
After Monica signed a deal to Rowdy Records, her debut album Miss Thang was released in July 1995, selling about one and a half million copies in the United States alone. It produced three top ten singles, including debut single "Don't Take It Personal (Just One of Dem Days)" and "Before You Walk Out of My Life", both of which made Monica the youngest artist ever to have two consecutive chart-topping hits on Billboard's Hot R&B Singles chart. Miss Thang earned Monica four Soul Train Music Award nods as well as Lady of Soul, NAACP Image Award, Billboard Music Award and American Music Award nominations. After a transition from Rowdy Records to Clive Davis's Arista label, Rowdy's parent company, Monica's mainstream success was boosted when the Diane Warren-written "For You I Will", from the Space Jam soundtrack, became her next top-ten pop hit.

After the success of her debut, Monica entered recording studios in 1997 to start work on her second album. Again, she worked closely with Dallas Austin on the bulk of the album, who shared executive producer credit with Davis on The Boy Is Mine. "Very personally involved" with the project, Davis consulted additional producers to work with the singer, including David Foster and Jermaine Dupri, the latter of which would become a frequent collaborator on subsequent projects. He also lined Monica up with several Diane Warren songs. A breakaway from the material on her debut, Monica considered the album a natural progression: "I was 13 then; the themes weren't as mature," she said. "I'm trying to portray a more assertive young female [...] I'm 17 now; my lyrics aren't sexually explicit but are about love and being in love." While she reportedly co-wrote several tracks for the album, none of them made the final cut.

== Promotion ==
On July 9, 1998, a listening party for the album was held in Los Angeles; another listening party was scheduled in New York City at a later date. Both of the listening parties were broadcast live via cyber cast on Arista Records website. Arista Records also planned for internet chats as well as online contests for fans. The label also planned for an international promotional tour for Monica. Monica also appeared on late night talk shows such as The Tonight Show with Jay Leno, Vibe, and morning shows such as Good Day Atlanta. In mid-June she shot the video for her second single "The First Night", and it was serviced to music video networks such as BET, MTV and The Box. After the release of the album, Monica did in-store appearances and also went on a promotional radio tour. Radio ads were played with announcements about the "win it before you buy it" contests. Items that were given in the contest included posters, flats, pins, flyers, and streamers. A back-to-school promotional campaign featuring Monica on book covers was also launched.

On July 7, 1998, Monica appeared on Live with Regis and Kathie Lee On August 21, she appeared on CBS This Morning. On August 28 Monica performed on The View. The next day, she made an appearance at KMEL's inaugural All-Star Jam in Mountain View, California at the Shoreline Amphitheatre. In September, she performed at the Soul Train Lady of Soul Awards, followed by a first time live performance of "The Boy Is Mine" with Brandy at the 15th annual MTV Video Music Awards. On October 5, 1998, Monica performed "The First Night" on Motown Live, and also sung a duet with Mary J. Blige during the show as well. On October 11, Monica performed at the 4th annual International Achievement in Arts Awards. Also in October, MTV News reported that Monica was to participate in several fashion shows for the House of Chanel and Karl Lagerfeld in Paris. On November 10, 1998, she performed "The First Night" on The Tonight Show with Jay Leno. On December 15, 1998, Monica went on The Rosie O'Donnell Show; three days later she appeared on Good Morning America.

In January 1999, MTV News reported that Monica was planning a possible joint tour with R. Kelly but no further news was mentioned regarding that tour. The same month, she performed on the Nickelodeon sketch comedy show All That. On February 5, she performed "Angel of Mine" on the Late Show with David Letterman In March 1999, Monica co-hosted and performed at the Soul Train Awards, which was held at the Shrine Auditorium in Los Angeles. Also in March she performed "Angel of Mine" on The Tonight Show with Jay Leno. On April 23, 1999, it was announced that Monica would be a part of Nickelodeon's first annual All That Music & More Fest with 98 Degrees, Tatyana Ali, and others. The tour began on June 17 in Indianapolis and ended on August 21 in Washington, D.C. In the midst of the festival Monica partnered with the Make-A-Wish Foundation to create skating parties. Also in April 1999 it was announced that Monica would perform on select dates during the third and final run of the Lilith Fair tour. In May 1999, a special ceremony was held for Monica in her hometown of Atlanta in which she was honored with the Phoenix Award. On August 30, 1999, she made yet another appearance on The Tonight Show with Jay Leno, performing "Street Symphony". In September 1999, Monica co-hosted and performed at the Soul Train Lady of Soul Awards. In November 1999, it was announced that Monica along with NSYNC, Wyclef Jean and Destiny's Child would perform at the Beacon Theatre for a HIV/AIDS awareness concert put together by Life Beat.

== Singles ==
The Boy Is Mine produced several singles. Its release was preceded by the lead single of the same name, a duet with fellow R&B singer Brandy, which was released on May 4, 1998. The collaboration received favorable reviews from contemporary music critics and became the first number-one pop record for both artists, both stateside and internationally. Exploiting the media's presumption of a rivalry between the two young singers, "The Boy Is Mine" became the best-selling song of the year in the United States, spending 13 weeks on top of the Billboard Hot 100. Internationally, the single also charted strongly, peaking at number-one in Canada, the Netherlands and New Zealand, while reaching the top five on most of the other charts on which it appeared. It was awarded the Grammy Award for Best R&B Performance by a Duo or Group and received nominations for both Record of the Year and Best R&B Song in 1999. At the Billboard Music Awards, the song won in three categories, including Hot 100 Sales Single of Year.

Dupri-produced "The First Night" was released as the album's second single, serviced to radio a week ahead of the album release and issued physically on July 28, 1998. Another commercial success, it became her second number one on the Billboard Hot 100 for six consecutive weeks. It remained within the top forty for 20 weeks and was ranked at number 18 on the Billboard Hot 100 year-end charts in 1998. Outside the United States, "The First Night" reached the top ten in Canada and the United Kingdom. "Angel of Mine", a cover version of British R&B trio Eternal's 1997 hit single, was released as the album's third offering single on November 9, 1998. The ballad became Monica's third chart topper for four consecutive weeks in the United States, and finished third on Billboard's 1999 year-end chart, making Monica the only artist to place within the year-end top ten in both from 1998 to 1999. While the song was less successful in territories where Eternal's version had charted the year before through Monica's rendition peaked at number two in Canada and reached the top 20 of the Australian Singles Chart.

"Inside", serving as the album's first promotional single, was released in Europe only on April 5, 1999, but failed to chart. A fifth single, "Street Symphony", received a US release as the fourth single on May 31, 1999, featuring orchestral background in the song performing by the Atlanta Symphony Orchestra. It peaked at number 50 on the Hot R&B/Hip-Hop Singles & Tracks chart. Monica's rendition of Richard Marx's 1989 single "Right Here Waiting", a duet with boy band 112, was released as the fifth and final single on December 14, 1999. The single was only released as a limited vinyl format with no music video, but peaked at number one on Billboard's Bubbling Under R&B/Hip-Hop Singles chart. Similarly, "Gone Be Fine", a collaboration with OutKast, reached number five on Bubbling Under R&B/Hip-Hop Singles.

== Critical reception ==
Professional ratings
Review scores
Source	Rating
AllMusic	4/5 stars
Entertainment Weekly	C+
Los Angeles Times	3.5/4 stars
Robert Christgau	(1-star Honorable Mention)
Rolling Stone	3/5 stars
The Sydney Morning Herald	2.5/4 stars

Upon its release, The Boy Is Mine garnered generally mixed to positive reviews from contemporary music critics, many of whom liked the album's ballads and classic sound, praising Monica for her vocal performance. Stephen Thomas Erlewine from AllMusic gave the album four out of five stars, complimenting the album as a whole, claiming it to be "as good as mainstream urban R&B gets in 1998." He felt that The Boy Is Mine compromised "a better, more consistent batch of songs" when in comparison to her debut album Miss Thang, led by productions from Dallas Austin who "not only does he give her songs immaculately crafted musical backdrops – both ballads and up-tempo dance numbers sound irresistible – but he helps her cultivate her voice so she sounds more mature than her 17 years." Paul Verna from Billboard gave the album a mixed review. Although he thought the ballads on the album showcased Monica's vocal maturity and range, he felt the material didn't have the same "bite" and "attitude" like songs from her debut album. Connie Johnson, writing for the Los Angeles Times rated the album three-and-a-half out of a possible four stars. After comparing her to Brandy, she found that Monica "really has more in common with label-mates Whitney Houston and Toni Braxton. Like them, she's a major league talent who knows it takes more than a great and memorable voice to bat the ball out of the park – and it's a pleasure to recommend someone with that type of professional savvy."

Natasha Stovall from the Rolling Stone gave The Boy Is Mine a mixed review, describing it as "a more classic path, with help from the cool hand of producer Dallas Austin." She found that the songs "hearken back past hip-hop songbirds like Mary J. Blige and adult-contemporary sirens like Toni Braxton to someplace closer to soul's source." Praising her vocals, Stovall commented that "Monica uses her honey-dipped, church-worthy voice to lift her radiofriendly tunes – and, hopefully, the rest of contemporary R&B – to a higher plane." Entertainment Weekly was critical on the amount of "mid-tempo ballads about love lost", but was positive towards the other songs on the album, writing that "much of this groove-driven disc, like the Jermaine Dupri-produced "The First Night", should keep her airwave run alive. Transcendent nuggets like "Street Symphony" showcase her voluptuous vocals." Generally positive toward The Boy Is Mine, Vibe magazine felt that "no longer encumbered by the extreme youth that made some of the more sensuous moments on Miss Thang vaguely embarrassing, Monica embraces womanhood with the full force of her raspy, resonant alto and flourishing postadolescent libido." Mary Tartaglione from The Sydney Morning Herald described Monica as a promising young artist, but concluded that The Boy Is Mine, despite a strong opening and the standout track "Street Symphony," ultimately suffered from inconsistency and limited lasting impact.

=== Accolades ===
In 2007, The Boy Is Mine was featured on British publication The Guardian's "1000 Albums To Hear Before You Die" list, the publication praised the album and thought that it was the template for "21st-century soul."

== Commercial performance ==
The Boy Is Mine debuted and peaked at number eight on the Billboard 200, with first-week sales of 91,000 copies; opening to nearly three times as many units as her debut album in 1995. It marked her first top ten entry on the chart, as well as her first album to reach the top three on Billboard's Top R&B Albums chart, debuting at number two behind Noreaga's N.O.R.E. (1998). The album sold nearly 526,000 during the first two months of its release, and 860,000 copies by the end of December 1998. In January 1999 the album was ranked as the 76th best-selling album of 1998 with sales of 1.1 million copies sold. By March 2002 the album had sold 1.96 million copies, and as of August 2010 it has sold 2,016,000 copies, according to Billboard. In June 2000, The Boy Is Mine was certified triple platinum by the Recording Industry Association of America (RIAA), for shipments of three million copies.

In Canada the album debuted on RPM' s Top Albums/CDs chart at number eleven, on the issue dated August 3, 1998. Eight weeks later, on the issue date of September 28, 1998, the album reached its peak at number ten. Overall, the album spent a total of 49 consecutive weeks on the Top Albums/CDs chart. To date, the album is certified triple-platinum by Music Canada, for denoting shipments of over 300,000 units. In Japan, The Boy Is Mine debuted at number 69 on the official Oricon chart, Elsewhere, the album became a top twenty success in the majority of the charts it appeared on, reaching number 13 on the Dutch Albums Chart, number 17 on the New Zealand Albums Chart, number 19 on the Swiss Albums Chart and number 20 on the French Albums Chart. It also charted in Australia, Germany, Sweden, and the United Kingdom. In the UK The Boy Is Mine was certified Silver by BPI on July 22, 2013, for shipments of 60,000 copies.

== Track listing ==
The Boy Is Mine track listing
No.	Title	Writer(s)	Producer(s)	Length
1.	"Street Symphony"	Dallas Austin	Austin	5:36
2.	"The Boy Is Mine" (duet with Brandy)	Brandy Norwood; Rodney Jerkins; Japhe Tejeda; Fred Jerkins III; LaShawn Daniels	Darkchild; Austin; Norwood	4:50
3.	"Ring da Bell"	Austin	Austin	4:23
4.	"The First Night"	Jermaine Dupri; Tamara Savage; Marilyn McLeod; Pam Sawyer	Dupri	3:55
5.	"Misty Blue"	Bobby Montgomery	Austin; Colin Wolfe	4:21
6.	"Angel of Mine"	Rhett Lawrence; Travon Potts	Darkchild	4:10
7.	"Gone Be Fine" (featuring OutKast)	Austin; Andre Benjamin	Austin	4:17
8.	"Inside"	Diane Warren	David Foster	4:11
9.	"Take Him Back"	Austin; Sting	Austin; Leslie Brathwaite	4:27
10.	"Right Here Waiting" (featuring 112)	Richard Marx	Foster; Tony Maserati^{[A]}	4:29
11.	"'Cross the Room"	Austin; Bill Curtis; Debra Killings	Austin	3:51
12.	"I Keep It to Myself"	Danny Sembello; Marti Sharron	Daryl Simmons	4:25
13.	"For You I Will"	Warren	Foster	4:54
Total length:				57:49

Japanese bonus tracks
No.	Title	Writer(s)	Producer(s)	Length
14.	"The First Night" (So So Def Mix)	Dupri; Savage; McLeod; Sawyer	Dupri; Carl So-Lowe^{[B]}	4:10
15.	"The First Night" (Razor N. Mix)	Dupri; Savage; McLeod; Sawyer	Dupri; Razor N.^{[B]}	3:55
Total length:				65:54

Notes

- ^{^[A]} denotes co-producer
- ^{^[B]} denotes additional producer

Sample credits

- "The First Night" samples Diana Ross' 1976 "Love Hangover".
- "Take Him Back" samples Sting's 1993 "Shape of My Heart".
- "Cross the Room" samples The Fatback Band's 1980 "I Like Girls".
- "Angel of Mine" is a cover version of Eternal's 1997 original recording.
- "Misty Blue" is a cover version of Dorothy Moore's 1976 original recording.
- "Right Here Waiting" is a cover version of Richard Marx's 1989 original recording.

== Personnel ==
Credits are taken from the album's liner notes.

Musicians and performers

- Background vocals – Monica, Darcy Aldridge, Sue Ann Carwell, Chelle Davis, Debra Killings, Pamela Major, Jeff Pescetto
- Bass guitar – Ronnie Garrett, Colin Wolfe
- Drums – Tom Knight
- Guitar – Sonny Lallerstedt, Tomi Martin, Isaac Phillips, Michael Thompson
- Piano – Dean Gant
- Percussion – Scott Meeder
- Strings – Darkchild Orchestra

Technical and production

- Executive producers – Clive Davis
- Engineering – A. Baars, G. Crawford, Felipe Elgueta, Ben Garrison, Humberto Gatica, Thom "TK" Kidd, Carlton Lynn, Ricco Lumpkins, Chris Tergesen
- Engineering assistants – John Horesco IV, Ty Hudson, Tim Lauber, Kevin Lively, Andrew Lyn, Vernon Mungo, Claudine Pontier, Mike Wilson
- Mixing – Leslie Brathwaite, Jermaine Dupri, Mick Guzauski, Rodney Jerkins, Dexter Simmons, Phil Tan
- Mixing assistants – Tom Berner, Kevin Lively, Marnie Riley
- Programming – Felipe Elgueta, John "J.R." Robinson, Glen Woodward
- Remixing – Tony Maserati

== Charts ==
=== Weekly charts ===
Weekly chart performance for The Boy Is Mine
Chart (1998)	Peak position
Australian Albums (ARIA)	37
Canada Top Albums/CDs (RPM)	10
Dutch Albums (Album Top 100)	13
Europe (European Top 100 Albums)	47
French Albums (SNEP)	20
German Albums (Offizielle Top 100)	34
Japanese Albums (Oricon)	69
New Zealand Albums (RMNZ)	17
Swedish Albums (Sverigetopplistan)	49
Swiss Albums (Schweizer Hitparade)	19
UK Albums (Official Charts)	52
UK R&B Albums (Official Charts)	6
US Billboard 200	8
US Top R&B/Hip-Hop Albums (Billboard)	2

=== Year-end charts ===
Year-end chart performance for The Boy Is Mine
Chart (1998)	Position
Canada Top Albums/CDs (RPM)	42
Canadian Albums (SoundScan)	42
Canadian R&B Albums (SoundScan)	5
US Billboard 200	95
US Top R&B/Hip-Hop Albums (Billboard)	49
Chart (1999)	Position
US Billboard 200	83
US Top R&B/Hip-Hop Albums (Billboard)	64

== Certifications ==
Certifications for The Boy Is Mine
Region	Certification	Certified units/sales
Canada (Music Canada)	3× Platinum	300,000^{^}
France (SNEP)	Gold	100,000^{*}
Japan (RIAJ)	Gold	100,000^{^}
United Kingdom (BPI)	Silver	60,000^{*}
United States (RIAA)	3× Platinum	3,000,000^{^}
^{*} Sales figures based on certification alone.^{^} Shipments figures based on certification alone.

== Release history ==
Release dates and formats for The Boy Is Mine
Region	Date	Edition(s)	Format(s)	Label(s)	Ref.
United Kingdom	July 13, 1998	Standard	CD; cassette	Arista	
Canada	July 14, 1998	Standard	CD; cassette	Arista	
United States	July 14, 1998	Standard	CD; cassette	Arista	
Japan	August 5, 1998	Standard	CD; cassette	Arista	
Japan	August 21, 1998	Standard	CD; cassette	Arista	
United Kingdom	October 12, 1998	Standard	CD; cassette	Arista	
