= Insides =

Insides may refer to:

- Insides (band), a British post-rock music duo
- Insides (Jon Hopkins album), 2009
- Insides (Fort Romeau album), 2015
- In Sides, a 1996 album by Orbital

== See also ==
- Inside (disambiguation)
