= Inside Out (XXI album) =

Studio album by XXI
- Released: September 18, 2015
- Genre: Christian rock
- Length: 36:57
- Label: Tooth & Nail

XXI chronology
Hell on Earth (2014)	Inside Out (2015)

Inside Out is the first studio album by the band XXI. The album was released on September 18, 2015, by Tooth & Nail Records.

== Critical reception ==
Professional ratings
Review scores
Source	Rating
CCM Magazine	3.5/5 stars
Jesus Freak Hideout	3.5/5 stars 3/5 stars
Jesus Wired	5.5/10 stars
New Release Today	3/5 stars

Awarding the album three and a half stars from Jesus Freak Hideout, Bert Gangl states, "by staying true to the former and playing up the latter, they wind up doing what they do very well, making Inside Out a nice addition to the heavy rock canon and a pretty impressive comeback effort from a set of battle-worn, but still tenacious, young men." Kevin Sparkman, indicating in a three and a half star review by CCM Magazine, responds, "Based on the recording’s precision and execution, you wouldn’t know that the composition...began as a mere hobby less than five years ago."

Scott Fryberger, giving the album three stars at Jesus Freak Hideout, writes, "at the end of the day, Inside Out has its moments, but overall it's just another reminder of the loss of Tooth & Nail's golden days." Rating the album three stars for New Release Today, Jonathan J. Francesco describes, "This is a strong introduction, and here's hoping the work that follows builds on this foundation and helps make their stance filling the rock and roll void a long-term proposition." Topher Parks, signaling in a 5.5 out of ten star review from Jesus Wired, responds, "it embodies the phrase 'run of the mill.'"

== Track listing ==
No.	Title	Length
1.	"Say It Again"	3:45
2.	"Hanging by a Thread"	3:13
3.	"Counting Me Out"	3:22
4.	"Wasn't Enough"	3:38
5.	"All I Want"	3:37
6.	"Misfit"	4:17
7.	"Cut Me Open"	3:43
8.	"Alive"	3:18
9.	"Without You"	4:19
10.	"Way You Love Me"	3:50
Total length:		36:57

== Chart performance ==
Chart (2015)	Peak position
US Christian Albums (Billboard)	20
US Heatseekers Albums (Billboard)	19
