= Backwards =

Backward or backwards is a relative direction.

Backwards may also refer to:

- Anadrome, a term created from another word spelled backwards
- "Backwards" (Red Dwarf), episode of sci-fi TV sitcom Red Dwarf
  - Backwards (novel), a novel based on the episode
- Backwards: The Riddle of Dyslexia, 1984 American TV program
- "Backwards" (Rascal Flatts song), a 2006 country music song on Me and My Gang
- "Backwards", a song by Apartment 26 from the Mission: Impossible 2 (soundtrack)
- "Backward", a song by Quicksand from the album Manic Compression
- "Backwards", a song by Quavo from the album Qrömelife
- "Backwards", a song by Jonas Brothers from the album Greetings from Your Hometown
- Backmasking, a recording technique in which a sound or message is recorded backward onto a track that is meant to be played forward

== See also ==
- Other Backward Class, a collective term used by the Government of India to classify castes which are educationally or socially disadvantaged
- "Sdrawkcab" (an anadrome of "backwards"), a 1998 episode of Dexter's Laboratory
