= Inside/outside =

The inside/outside model of political reform is the organizing method/philosophy being used by the Progressive Democrats of America in its efforts to change the Democratic Party but also to foster a broad grass-roots progressive social and political movement.
