= The Insider (Latynina novel) =

1999 novel by Yulia Latynina

- Author: Yulia Latynina (Юлия Латынина)
- Original title: Инсайдер (Russian)
- Language: Russian
- Series: Other Worlds
- Genre: Science fiction novel
- Publisher: Olma-Press (Russia)
- Publication date: 1999 (Russian edition)
- Publication place: Russia
- Media type: Print (Hardback & Paperback)
- Pages: 554
- ISBN: 5-224-00517-5
- OCLC: 44836032
- Preceded by: Wizards and ministers

The Insider (Russian: Инсайдер) is the final book of the science fiction literary cycle Empire of Weia by Russian writer Yulia Latynina.

This novel was published in 1999 in Olma-Press (Russia). The story takes place on another planet in a feudal empire, which began to interact with the highly developed civilization on Earth.

== Main characters ==
- Terence Bemish - the finance adventurer and greenmailer from Federation of Nineteen on the Earth
- Kissur — the barbarian leader and the Emperor's favorite
- Shavash — the finance vice-minister of Empire

== Publish ==
- Latynina, Yulia (1999). The Insider. Other Worlds. Olma-Press. ISBN 5-224-00517-5. 9000 copies.
- Latynina, Yulia (2007). The Insider. Eksmo. ISBN 978-5-699-20885-2. 10000 copies.
- Latynina, Yulia (2009). The Insider. AST. ISBN 978-5-17-058010-1. 5000 copies.

== Awards ==
ABC Award from Arkady and Boris Strugatsky in 2000. Boris Strugatsky said: "It's the new type of the novels".

== Reviews ==
- Reviews (in Russian)
