= Outside Inside =

Outside Inside may refer to:

- Outsideinside, a 1968 album by Blue Cheer
- Outside Inside (The String Cheese Incident album), 2001
- Outside Inside (The Tubes album), 1983
- "Outside-Inside" (song), by Gigolo Aunts, from their 1988 album Everybody Happy
- "Outside Inside", by Matt Brouwer from his 2012 album Till the Sunrise

== See also ==
- Inside Outside (disambiguation)
