= Yulia Latynina =

Russian writer and journalist (born 1966)

- Юлия Латынина
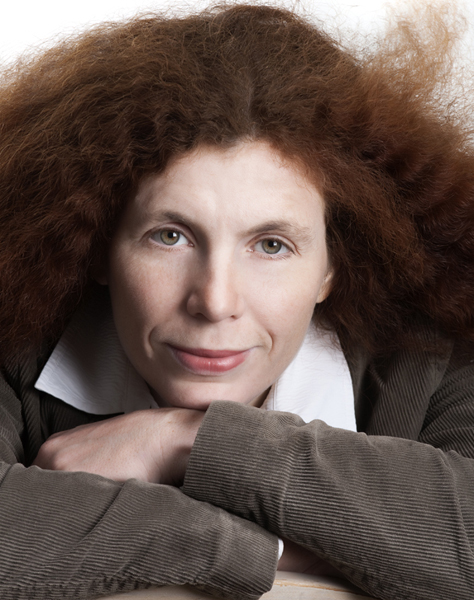
- Latynina in 2010
- Born: Yulia Leonidovna Latynina; 16 June 1966 (age 60); Moscow, RSFSR, Soviet Union (now Russia)
- Education: Maxim Gorky Literature Institute; Gorky Institute of World Literature (CS)
- Occupations: Writer, journalist, political commentator
- Employer: Novaya Gazeta
- Notable work: The Insider
- Parents: Leonid Latynin; Alla Latynina
- Website: Her Youtube channel in Russian

Yulia Leonidovna Latynina (Russian: Юлия Леонидовна Латынина; born 16 June 1966) is a Russian independent journalist, writer and political commentator. She became well-known as a columnist for Novaya Gazeta and was the most popular host at the Echo of Moscow radio station for years. Latynina has written more than twenty books, primarily fantasy and crime fiction.

== Biography ==
=== Family and education ===
Yulia Latynina was born in Moscow on 16 June 1966. Her father is writer Leonid Latynin and her mother is literary critic Alla Latynina.

Yulia Latynina studied philology at the Maxim Gorky Literature Institute from 1983 to 1988. In 1993, under the supervision of Professor Vyacheslav Ivanov she defended her PhD at the Gorky Institute of World Literature.

=== Journalistic career ===
Latynina started her journalistic career as an economic columnist. She worked for periodicals Segodnya (1995–96), Izvestia (1996–97), Expert (1997–98), Sovershenno Secretno (1999–2000), and others. By 2000, Latynina already had a reputation as one of the leading journalists in the field of economics. In 2001 she became a columnist for Novaya Gazeta. In the same year, she was invited to host Rublevaya Zona, an analytical programme on NTV. The show started her TV career. In 2003, it was followed by an analytical programm 24 that was broadcast on REN TV.

Later, Latynina worked for Ezhednevny Zhurnal (2005–15) and Gazeta.ru (2006–2013). She also worked for television channels NTV (2000–01), ORT (2001–02), TVS (2002–03) and REN TV (2003–04). In 2003 Latynina started hosting the show Access Code at a radio station Echo of Moscow.

In 2007, Italian newspaper Corriere della Sera named her best foreign journalist in an award ceremony dedicated to Maria Grazia Cutuli.

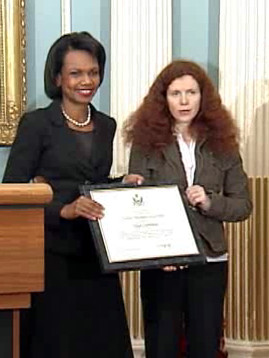
Condoleezza Rice presents Latynina with the Freedom Defenders Award in 2008

In 2008, Latynina received the Freedom Defenders Award from the United States Department of State. She received the award from Condoleezza Rice, who praised the journalist for her achievements:

Yulia has exposed corruption and abuses of authority among government officials as well as egregious human rights violations by both government authorities and private actors, particularly in the North Caucasus.

— Condoleezza Rice

=== Views ===
Yulia Latynina is known for her sharp and polemic statements. She proclaims herself a libertarian; however in its classic meaning of maximal personal freedom, standing in strong opposition to left politics and the woke culture.

She denies global warming and called Michael E. Mann's controversial hockey stick graph a fake, or rather based on bad math; she believes there is no strong model ubiquitously predicting such singular temperature growth. As of the year 2020 she prefers to cite Bjørn Lomborg's position, which claims current temperature raise, which may change to global cooling after not yet determined period as happened before. She believes there is no proven bad impact from the temperature growth, because earlier it was associated only with rise of civilizations. She believes there is no human, or carbon dioxide role in this because there are much stronger forces, like solar cycles and oceanic currents involved. So she concludes that the carbon dioxide control policies are baseless, and unrealistic.

Latynina was a member of the Committee 2008.

She voiced an opinion that universal suffrage was bad for poor countries. She also criticized western left-liberalism and human rights organizations which she thinks are used by Muslim extremists as useful idiots, as coined by Stalin, to prevent winning the war on terror.

In her opinion, Moscow Helsinki Group was wrong in supporting Russian scientist Igor Sutyagin, who she suggested could actually be involved in espionage. She argued that although communications of Sutyagin with foreign spy agencies have never been proven, the foreign agency that he passed information on was indeed highly suspicious.

Latynina has been a consistent critic of leftist politics. In September 2020, she said: "I. e, the owners of Sargon-like countries are witnessing the same propaganda, a similar technology of total lies combined with socialism and leftist ideas. It penetrates all the structures of Western society... Here, the USSR used to be creating socialism for everyone, and, in the United States, the politicians were a lot smarter. Even those with the left [political] orientation have been creating socialism only for the poor".

In May 2024, Latyina wrote an article to Novaya Gazeta, titled, "Baby Astyanax and the microwave", where she made comparisons between "barbarians" destroying "blossoming civilisations" and the Palestinians as well as calling students who protested against Israel’s actions in Gaza as "lazy and stupid".

In her article dated 25 March 2025, she criticises the statement that Russians as nation have to through the same process that Germans went through after World War II. She states that "after the First World War Germany was labeled to be the guilty one, Austria was separated. New countries of Eastern Europe with the approval of the winners built their local Nazism". She also goes on to say that "Nazism in Europe started not in Germany. It began in these small countries. German Nazism was a response to that". In one more claim she hints that Czechoslovakia was conducting a genocide of Sudeten Germans by comparing their treatment to Rwandan genocide: "Tomáš Masaryk promised to Woodrow Wilson that he'd build a new Switzerland, but instead he built Rwanda. No wonder Sudeten Germans have all supported Hitler."

=== Attacks ===
In retaliation for her political stance and categorical statements, Latynina became a victim of several attacks. On 20 August 2016, she was assaulted by two men in motorcycle helmets who poured feces on her. On the night of 18 and 19 July 2017, unknown assailants attacked Latynina's house and sprayed it with a very pungent and caustic type of gas of unknown composition. Along with herself, 8 people were additionally injured in the gas attack, including four elderly people and two children. She said that she would not bring the case to the officials as police had not investigated some attacks on opposition politicians, however, Dmitry Muratov reported the attack to the police.

On 2 September, Latynina's car was set on fire. The investigator said that "the car caught fire by itself". On 9 September, Latynina announced that she and her family are leaving Russia and would not return "in the near future". She called the car's arson an attempted murder. According to her father, Latynina had been under surveillance for some time, and the attackers were not bandits but an organized group that received commands from certain influential people.

=== In emigration ===
Latynina has been a member of the Anti-War Committee of Russia since February 2022. In September of the same year, she was included in the Russian list of foreign agents.

== Writing career ==
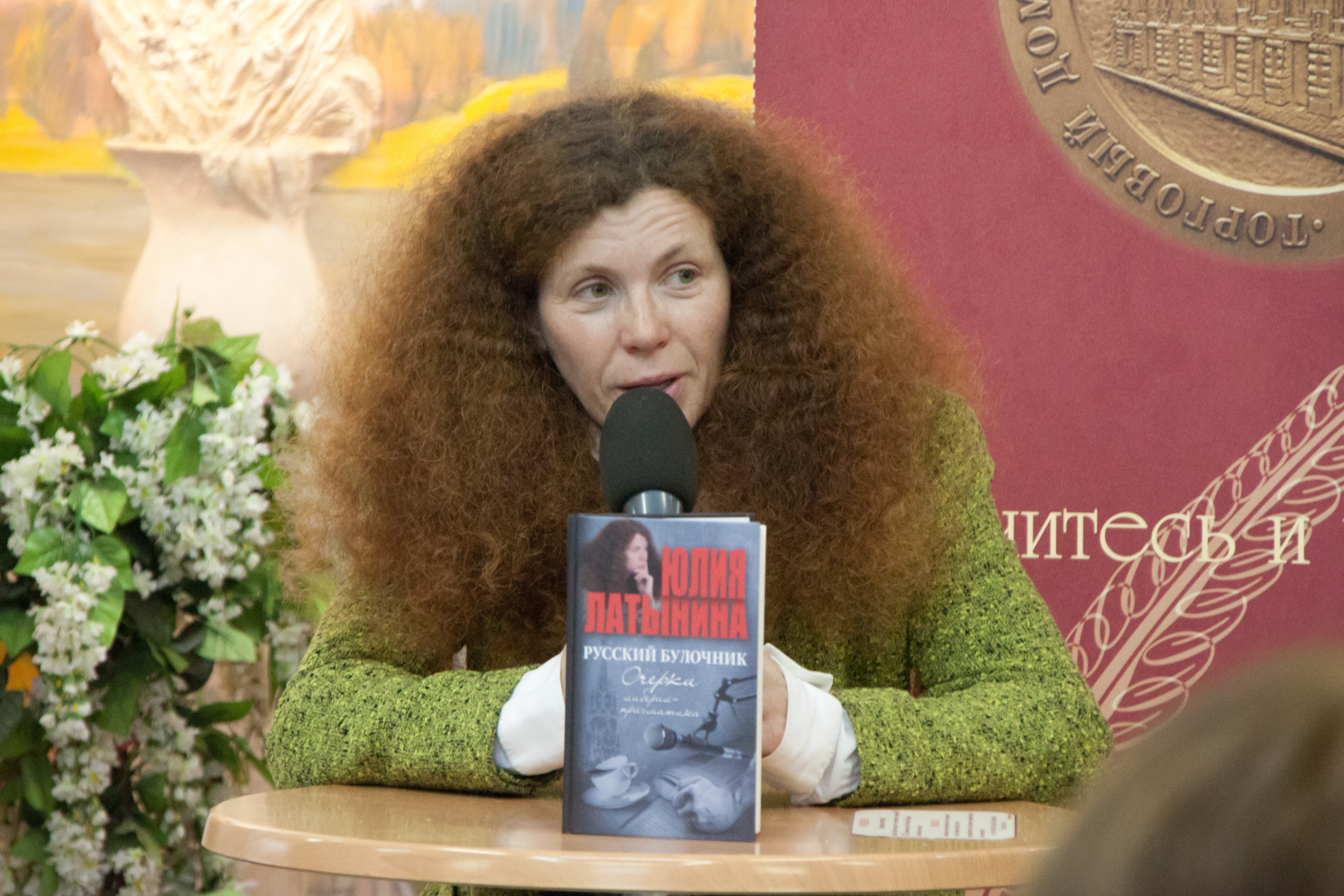
Presentation of the book Russian Baker in 2013

Latynina published her first novel in 1990. For some time she used a pen-name Eugene Klimovich, however, most subsequent printings were issued under the author's real name. She works in the genre of sharp detective-adventure prose on Russian material as well as in fiction. In 1995 Latynina won the Russian Booker Prize for her novel Clearchus and Heraclea and the Strannik for The Preacher. Later she was nominated to the National Bestseller literary prize, as well as the Russian Booker and several others. The total print run of Yulia Latynina's books from 1999 to 2000 has exceeded 500,000 copies.

Year	Title in Russian	Translation	Genre	Cycle
1991	«Дело о пропавшем боге»	A Case of the Missing God	Fantasy	Wei Empire
1994	«Клеарх и Гераклея»	Clearchus and Heraclea	Fantasy	
1995	«Бомба для банкира»	The Bomb for the Banker	Crime fiction	Bandit
1996	«Колдуны и министры»	Wizards and Ministers	Fantasy	Wei Empire
1996	«Сто полей»	The 100 Squares	Fantasy	Wei Empire
1996	«Повесть о Золотом Государе»	Tale of the Golden Emperor	Fantasy	Wei Empire
1997	«Здравствуйте, я ваша крыша»	Hello, I'm Your Roof	Fantasy	
1999	«Бандит»	Bandit	Crime fiction	Bandit
1999	«Охота на изюбря»	Hunting Elk	Crime fiction	Industrial Area
1999	«Инсайдер»	The Insider	Fantasy	Wei Empire
1999	«Повесть о государыне Кассии»	Tale of the Empress Cassia	Fantasy	Wei Empire
1999	«Дело о лазоревом письме»	Case of the Azure Letter	Fantasy	Wei Empire
2000	«Разбор полётов»	Debriefing	Crime fiction	Bandit
2000	«Саранча»	Locust	Crime fiction	Bandit
2000	«Стальной король»	Steel King	Crime fiction	Industrial Area
2001	«Ничья»	The Draw	Crime fiction	
2003	«Промзона»	Industrial Area	Crime fiction	Industrial Area
2004	«Только голуби летают бесплатно»	Only Pigeons Fly for Free	Crime fiction	
2005	«Джаханнам, или До встречи в Аду»	Jahannam, or See You in Hell	Thriller	Caucasus
2005	«Ниязбек»	Niyazbek	Thriller	Caucasus
2007	«Земля войны»	The Land of War	Thriller	Caucasus
2007	«Нелюдь»	Inhuman	Fantasy	
2009	«Не время для славы»	No Time for Glory	Thriller	Caucasus
2012	«Русский булочник»	Russian Baker	Non-fiction	
2018	«Иисус. Историческое расследование»	Jesus. Historical Investigation	Non-fiction	Historical Investigation
2019	«Христос с тысячью лиц»	Christ with a Thousand Faces	Non-fiction	Historical Investigation
2025	«Сотворение Бога»	Creation of God	Non-fiction	Historical Investigation

== See also ==
- List of Russian-language novelists
