= Inside Looking Out (disambiguation) =

"Inside-Looking Out", also written "Inside Looking Out", is a 1966 song by The Animals, covered by Grand Funk Railroad

Inside Looking Out may also refer to:

- Inside Looking Out, a character from Mad TV
- Inside Looking Out (film), a 1977 feature film
