= Leonid Latynin =

Russian writer (born 1938)

- Леонид Александрович Латынин
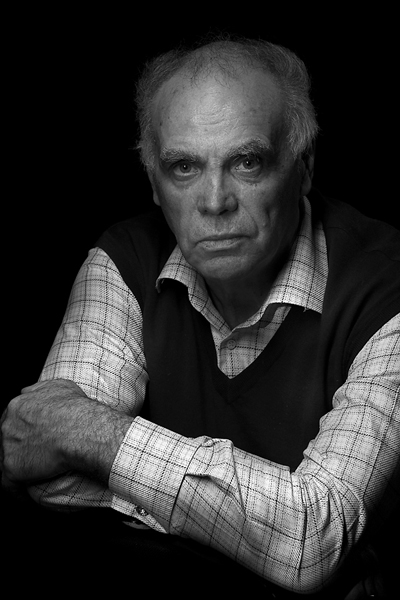
- Born: 20 July 1938 (age 88); Moscow, Russian SFSR, Soviet Union
- Education: Moscow State University
- Occupations: poet and writer
- Years active: 1968–present
- Spouse: Alla Latynina
- Children: Yulia Latynina
- Website: latynin.ru (in Russian)

Leonid Latynin (Russian: Леонид Александрович Латы́нин; born 1938 Privolzhsk, Ivanovo Region, on the Volga near Plyos) is a Russian writer.

He is the husband of literary critic Alla Latynina and the father of writer and journalist Yulia Latynina.

In 1960–64, Latynin studied at Moscow University's Department of Philology. He attended the seminars of Nikolai Gudzy, Nikolai Liban, and Sergei Radzig, which made a lasting influence on him, inspiring his interest in the theme of pre-Christian pantheon. This was later realized in his research and his literary work.

In 1962–74, he worked first at the Khudozhestvennaya Literatura Publishing House, then on the radio (in the Spanish and then in the Brazilian section) and finally at the poetry division of Youth magazine.

In the 1970s, he spent much time in the northern parts of Russia, studying icons and local crafts.

In the 1980s, he translated Central Asian poetry.

Also in the 1980s, he wrote the novels The Face-maker and the Muse, Sleeper at Harvest Time, and Stavr and Sarah.
