= Insiders (band) =

American rock band

Insiders were an American rock band from Chicago, Illinois.

The group played locally in the Chicago area in the mid-1980s, and was initially courted by Warner Bros. Records before signing with Epic Records and releasing a debut album in 1987. That album, Ghost on the Beach, peaked at #167 on the Billboard 200 on the strength of a single also titled "Ghost on the Beach", which reached #8 on the Billboard mainstream rock singles chart. The group eventually left Epic and signed with independent label Monsterdisc, releasing two albums for the label in the 1990s.

== Members ==
- John Siegle - vocals, guitar
- Gary Yerkins - vocals, guitar
- Jim DeMonte - bass
- Ed Breckenfeld - drums
- Jay O'Rourke - guitar

== Discography ==
- Ghost on the Beach (Epic, 1987)
- Not for Sale (Monsterdisc, 1993)
- Fate in Action (Monsterdisc, 1994)
