= Alla Latynina =

Russian literary critic (born 1940)

- Алла Николаевна Латынина
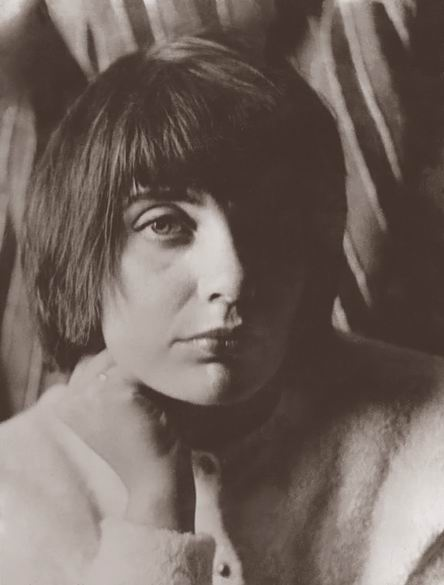
- Alla Latynina (photo L.Latynin, 1970-s)
- Born: Alla Nikolayevna Bocharova; 4 July 1940 (age 86); Moscow, Russian SFSR, Soviet Union
- Education: Moscow State University
- Occupations: literary critic and scholar
- Years active: 1965–present
- Spouse: Leonid Latynin
- Children: Yulia Latynina

Alla Nikolayevna Latynina (Russian: А́лла Никола́евна Лат́ынина; born 4 July 1940) is a Russian literary critic. Her husband is the writer and poet Leonid Latynin. She is the mother of Russian writer and journalist Yulia Latynina.

== Biography ==
Alla Nikolayevna Latynina was born on 4 July 1940 in Moscow into the family of an office worker. She graduated from the Department of Philology, Moscow University in 1963 upon which she took a post-graduate course at the Department of Philosophy, Moscow University. She defended her PhD on the subject of "Critique of the Existential Interpretation of Dostoyevsky". She received the Cand. Sc. degree in Philosophy in 1970.

Latynina has been publishing as a critic since 1969. In 1963–65, she worked at the Sovetsky Pisatel publishing house. In 1969–2003, she worked on the staff of the Literary Gazette as a columnist, head of the section for literary history, and editor at the Russian literature section. In 1992–93, she worked at Obschaya Gazeta in charge of the culture section. She was a columnist on the VremyaMN weekly since 2002. In 1994–2001, she was the head of the literary department and columnist at the Literary Gazette. She was a columnist on the Novy Mir magazine since 2001. She was on the editorial board of the Moscow Vestnik magazine (1989); on the board of the book series "Anons" at Moskovsky Rabochy Publishers (1989–90), and the Strelets magazine. She served as chairman on the following juries: Russian Booker Prize in 1992, Appolon Grigoryev Prize in 2001, Alexander Blok Prize in 2000, Russian Subject Prize in 2002. She was the winner of the Literary Gazette Prize and the Journalists Union Prize in 1977. She was the winner of the Novy Mir Prize in 2005. She was a member of the Writers Union since 1979. She is a member of the Russian PEN.

== Works ==
- 1986 – Vsevolod Garshin: His Work and Fate. Moscow, Khudozhestvennaya Literatura Publishers.
- 1987 – Signs of the Times: Notes on the Current Literary Process. 1970s and 1980s. Moscow, Sovetsky Pisatel.
- 1988 – "Truth and Nothing but the Truth". Blank Pages of Russian History in Contemporary Prose. Moscow. Znanie Society.
- 1991 – Beyond the Open Barrier: Literary Scene of the Late 1980s. Moscow, Sovetsky Pisatel.
- 2009 – Commentary: Notes on Contemporary Literature. Moscow, Vremya, 2009.
