= Inside (Monica song) =

Promotional single by Monica

from the album The Boy Is Mine
- Released: April 5, 1999
- Genre: R&B
- Length: 4:11
- Label: Arista; BMG International
- Songwriter: Diane Warren
- Producer: David Foster

"Inside" is a song from American singer Monica's second studio album, The Boy Is Mine. It was released only in Europe as the album's first promotional single in April 1999. The video, directed by Earle Sebastian (known for his work for Madonna, Mary J. Blige, Destiny's Child, among others) only received airplay in Europe as promotion for the album.

== Background and release ==
"Inside" was the fourth release overall from The Boy Is Mine and the only official release in Europe. The CD version of the song features various remixes produced by Masters at work. The song became Monica's first official release not reaching the charts in the United Kingdom.

== Format and track listings ==
These are the formats and track listings of major releases of "Inside."

European CD single

1. "Inside" (Album Version) - 4:11
2. "Inside" (Masters At Work Radio Edit) - 4:15

European CD maxi single

UK CD single (Part One)

1. "Inside" (Album Version) - 4:11
2. "Inside" (Masters At Work Remix) (Radio Edit) - 4:15
3. "Inside" (Masters At Work Remix) - 8:17

UK and French CD single ("Masters At Work Remixes")

1. "Inside" (Masters At Work Remix) (Radio Edit) - 3:53
2. "Inside" (Masters At Work Dub) - 8:16
3. "Inside" (Masters At Work Dub Intro Vocal Mix) - 7:09

European 12-inch vinyl ("Masters At Work Remixes")

1. "Inside" (Masters At Work Remix) - 8:16
2. "Inside" (Masters At Work Vocal Dub) - 3:55
3. "Inside" (Masters At Work Dub) - 8:16
4. "Inside" (Album Version) - 4:11
