= Insideout =

Israeli Eurodance act

Insideout אינסיידאוט
- Origin: Givatayim, Israel
- Genres: Eurodance
- Years active: 1994–1997
- Labels: Phonokol
- Past members: Tomer Glatt; Alon Levin

Insideout was an Israeli Eurodance act formed in 1994 which is considered to be the first Israeli Eurodance group.

== History ==
The group was founded in 1994 by Tomer Glatt and Alon Levin, two 16-year-old high school students from Givatayim who attended to the same class.

Under the record company "Phonokol" the group released their first hit song during 1994 in collaboration with the singer Didi. The song achieved relative success in the carts in Israel and Spain.

During 1995 and 1996 the group released four more singles that were very successful in the Israeli charts as well – the song "Lover" (performed in collaboration with Dikla Shachar), "Will You (Still Love Me), "Let's Go", and "One Last Thing". This local success attracted interest in the group worldwide, as some of the group's songs of began appearing in compilation albums of contemporary hits.

During the second half of the 1990s Insideout's career faded mainly due to Levin's recruitment to the army.

In 1997, the group released their last single to the markets which was a cover version to Sash!'s hit "Ecuador".

== Discography ==
=== Singles ===
- 1994 – "Dance" (featuring Didi)
- 1995 – "Lover"
- 1995 – "Will You (Still Love Me)"
- 1996 – "Let's Go"
- 1996 – "One Last Thing"
- 1997 – "Sing The Ecuador"
- 2001 – "Insideout"
