= Inside-Out Prison Exchange Program =

International educational program in Pennsylvania, US

The Inside-Out Prison Exchange Program (Inside-Out) is an international educational program based at Temple University in Philadelphia. The program was established in 1997 to bring traditional college students and incarcerated persons together in semester-long courses to explore and learn about issues of crime and justice from behind prison walls, based on the hypothesis that incarcerated and non-incarcerated students might mutually benefit from studying together as peers.

== History ==
The idea for the Inside-Out program came from a visit by Temple University professor Lori Pompa and a group of undergraduate to the Pennsylvania state correctional facility in Dallas, PA, in 1995. Following a panel discussion with a group of prisoners, one of the panelists suggested that the discussion could be expanded to a semester-long course.

In 1997, this became the first Inside-Out program, launched as a partnership between Temple University and the Philadelphia Prison System. In 2002 this expanded to take in Graterford Prison, a state facility. The program at Graterford evolved into the Graterford Think Tank, and in 2004 this launched training sessions for instructors from other universities to expand the program. By 2015, over 20,000 students and prisoners had studied on Inside-Out programs and it had expanded to over 130 institutions, including Ohio State University and Stanford University. The first international programs were established in Canada in 2011.

In 2014, the first Inside-Out program was launched in the United Kingdom at Durham University, followed by the University of Teesside and the University of Kent. A similar program, called Learning Together, was launched by the University of Cambridge outside of the Inside-Out scheme. A profile of the Cambridge scheme in the Guardian in 2016 that did not acknowledge that it drew upon methodology pioneered by Inside-Out led to a letter to the editor from academics at Durham, Teesside, Kent and other UK universities saying: "We welcome the contribution that any UK colleagues make in developing prison education opportunities here but urge them to acknowledge Inside-Out and the role it has played in shaping their project if drawing so heavily upon it." The original article was amended after publication to acknowledge that the Inside-Out program at Durham had pioneered such work in the UK, prior to the Cambridge scheme. In 2016, the University of Westminster's convict criminology group started a program with students studying alongside inmates at Pentonville Prison based on the Inside-Out model. A review of education in UK prisons for the British Ministry of Justice in 2016 identified Durham's Inside-Out partnership and the similar programs at Cambridge and Westminster as examples of good practice in prison education.

== Inside-Out courses ==
The program provides individuals on both sides of the prison walls the unique opportunity to engage in a collaborative, dialogic examination of issues of social significance through the particular lens that is the "prism of prison." Through college classes and community exchanges, the program seeks to deepen the conversation about and transform our approaches to understanding crime, justice, freedom, inequality, and other issues of social concern. Inside-Out creates a paradigm shift for participants, encouraging transformation and change in individuals and, in so doing, serves as an engine for social change. Since its inception, students of Inside-Out both inside and outside have time and again claimed that the experience transformed the ways they viewed themselves and the world.

As of November 2023, more than 1,200 Inside-Out courses have been held around the world. Over 150 higher education institutions, partnered with over 200 correctional institutions, have hosted courses. Courses cover a wide range of academic disciplines, including: African-American studies, anthropology, communications, criminal justice, economics, education, English, gender studies, history, law, natural sciences, nursing, philosophy, political science, psychology, public health, religious studies, social work, sociology, theater, visual arts, and women’s studies. As of November 2023, Inside-Out courses are taught in the Australia, Canada, Denmark, Ireland, Mexico, the Netherlands, the United Kingdom, and the United States.
