= Outside In (organization) =

Medical and youth service nonprofit organization in Portland, Oregon

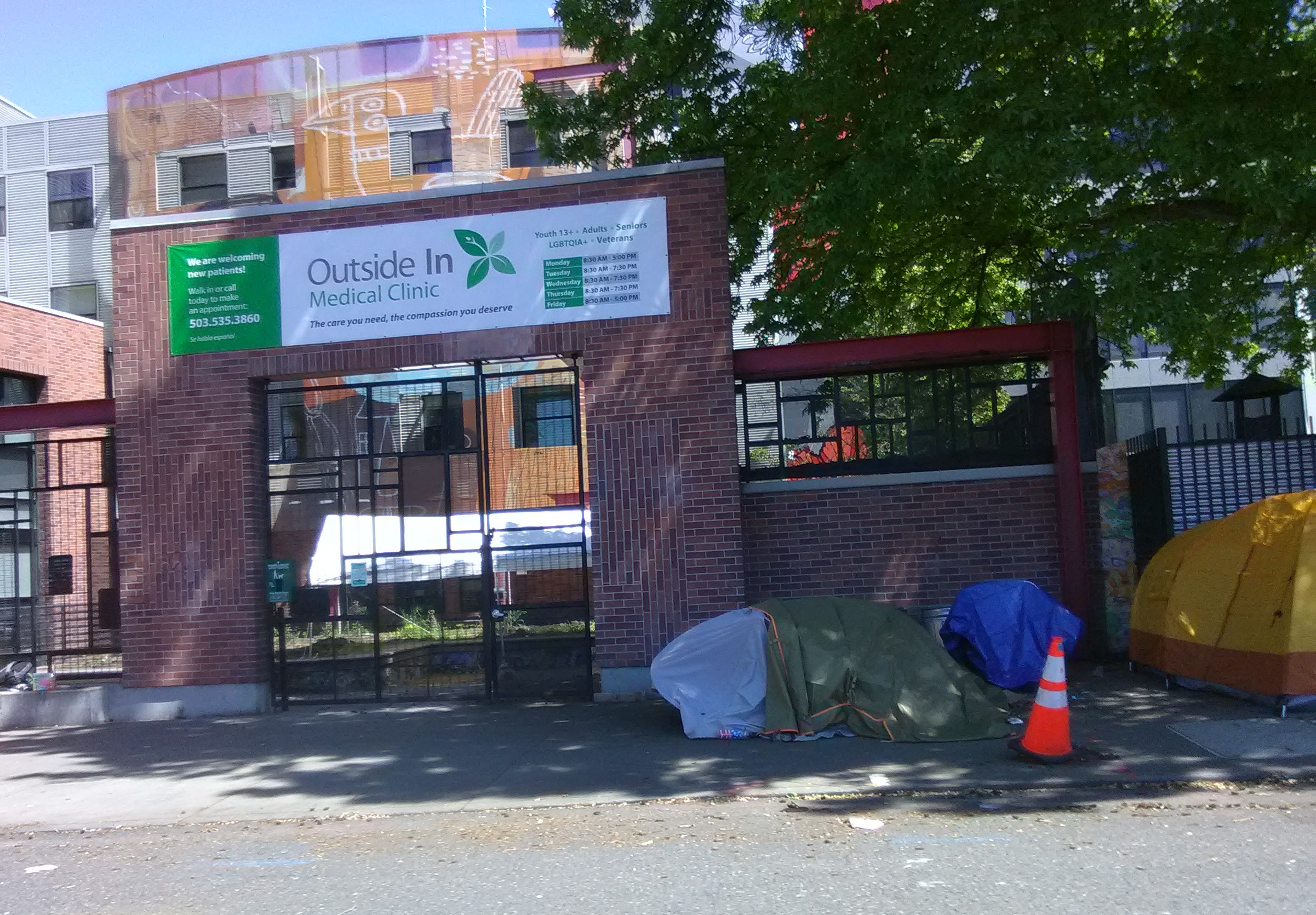
- The exterior of the organization in May 2022
- Formation: 1968
- Type: 501(c)(3)
- Registration no.: EIN 93-0567549
- Headquarters: 1132 SW 13th Avenue
- Location: Portland, Oregon, U.S.
- Executive Director: Kiku Johnson
- Budget: about $12 million (2018)
- Staff: about 200 (2024)
- Website: outsidein.org

Exterior of "Outside In IDU Health Services" in March 2019 at 1219 SW Main St which hosts the needle exchange. Fentanyl pipe (top) and methamphetamine pipe (bottom) distributed by Outside In Drug Users Health Services

Outside In is a medical and youth service nonprofit organization in Portland, Oregon, United States that provides primary care and "wraparound services" for low income and homeless clients. It also has several other programs such as needle exchange program for drug users, and eligibility restricted tattoo removal service. The needle exchange has been the cause of community objection as well as cancellation of insurance policy and donors declining to give. It has reported that in fiscal year 2015–2016, it has given out 988,399 needles which was 20,962 more needles than what was returned. Founded in 1968 to serve youth, the organization has since continued to revise its services to meet the needs of its clients. Its services as described in October 2014 include medical care, mobile medical vans, tattoo removal, housing, education, counseling, and job training.

== History ==
Three founders, Dr. Charles Spray, Arnold Goldberg, and Mary Lu Zurcher founded Outside In in June 1968 and it was one of the earliest free clinics on the west coast. The organization was founded to serve Portland's "alienated youth", some of whom were illegal drug users and most had mental health issues. At its beginning, it operated out of a rented space at First Unitarian Church of Portland in downtown Portland. Spray helped found the organization after learning that the Unitarian church's youth coffeehouse space, Charix, was in danger of being shut down by the city and a group that had successfully shut down the Crystal Ballroom music venue because of its association with the 1960s drug culture. Outside In was told by its insurance carrier that all of the organization's policies would be cancelled if they were to start a needle exchange. It took the clinic a few years to find a replacement insurance carrier. The needle exchange program is one of the earliest in the US. Although originally scheduled to open in July 1988, the actual opening was delayed until November 1989 over insurance issues. It was started as a pilot project involving 125 drug addicts. Bud Clark, the mayor at the time expressed concerns that it maybe seen by some as encouraging drug use. In September 2002, Portland Business Journal reported some prospective donors refuse to donate to Outside In, because of its needle exchange program.

Some of the group's early work involved staffing a 24-hour crisis hotline that was later spun off to form the Metro Crisis Intervention Service.

In November 2017, two staff members were stabbed on the job; as a result, in May 2018 the workers of Outside In voted to unionize, with Oregon AFSCME as their parent union.

Willamette Week reported in April 2019 that Outside In employees are members of AFSCME along with a handful of other private nonprofits heavily funded by government contracts.

In April 2019, Outside In announced the plan to add a second location in Gresham intended to provide services to "unique populations that are not well-served in other health care settings,". The location opened in September 2020.

By 2023, the street on which the organization is located on has become the point of encampment congregation by homeless youth who rely on Outside In services.

In 2024, the organization laid off employees twice.

== Services ==
Outside In is a Federally Qualified Health Center (FQHC) and a licensed mental health agency, and also operates a needle exchange. The syringe exchange, implemented in 1989, was the first one to be developed and the third to go into operation in the country. The needle exchange program has been operating a fentanyl testing service on street drugs for about two years where subjects bring samples of their illegal drugs or drug residues from paraphernalia as told to Oregon Public Broadcasting. The article said drug possession remains strictly illegal. They have also been handing out other supplies like glass pipes, tin foil and naloxone at its downtown Portland location. In 2023, the organization self reported it served 969 youth with mental health care, drug and alcohol treatment, employment, education, job training, and housing. Outside In's medical clinic provided primary care to 4,601 patients in 2023. The same year, the group's syringe exchange furnished 1.14 million syringes to 3,157 clients. The organization's harm reduction program has received over a million dollars from Measure 110 funding and an estimated 100 clients utilize it daily. Some of the funds are directed to the purchase of pipes, needles and other supplies. After it started handing out smoking supplies in October 2022, its program manager reported this caused an 87% increase in monthly visit to the ham reduction services.

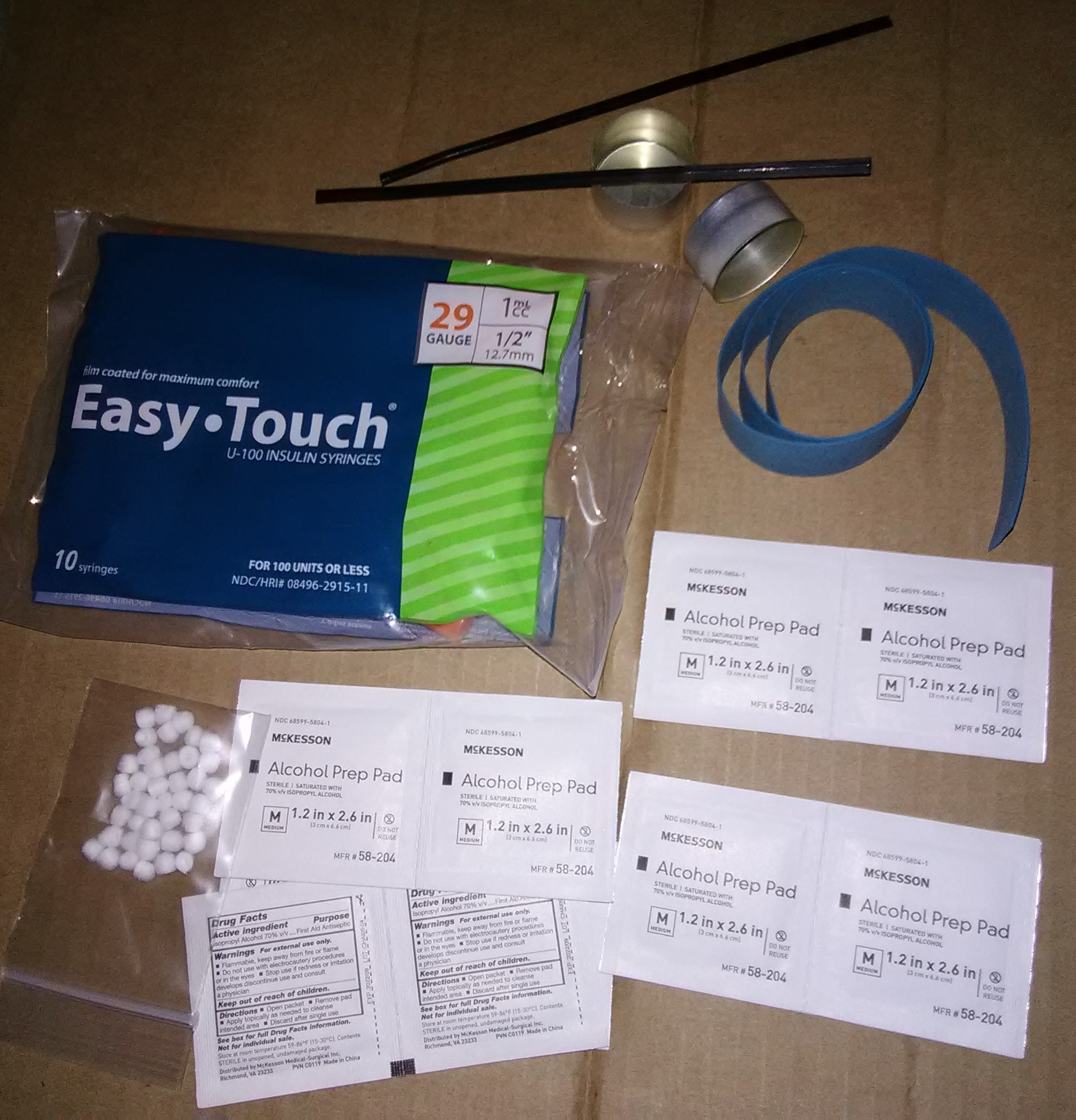
Injection kit given out by the Outside In IDU Health Services to drug addicts

=== Community objection ===
The needle exchange program offered through Outside In and Multnomah County was the subject of a grievance by the adjacent neighborhood Goose Hollow Foothills League due to concerns that needles handed out by Outside In are littered in Goose Hollow by its drug addict clients. The neighborhood association sent a letter on the matter of needles and other supplies given out by Outside In to a Multnomah County Commissioner Sharon Meieran in February 2018. This letter was published in part in Portland Tribune

"We are drowning in the needles put out into the community by Multnomah County," said a letter complaining about the health department program that was sent to Commissioner Sharon Meieran by the Goose Hollow Foothills League last month. "Our residents are picking up hundreds of needles each week," the letter states. "Our neighborhood has experienced a shocking increase in unsafe and unsanitary levels of needles since MCHD started this program ... while keeping drug addicts safer, MCHD is risking the health of thousands more with this program. "Our neighborhood is also filled with bloody cotton balls and feces-covered wipes that were given out at Outside In," added the letter, which was signed by Tracy Prince, the league's vice chair. "It is humane and necessary to hand out these items, but MCHD should put a plan in place so that these items aren't disposed of in our neighborhoods."

In May 2019, a Portland activist Brandon Farley who believes the needle exchange add to a city's addiction and homelessness problems dumped out syringe caps and dirty syringes on the sidewalk in front of the Outside In's needle exchange in what he calls as an "act of civil disobedience". The harm reduction program's policy of prohibiting drug use within three blocks from facilities while handing out paraphernalia has drawn criticism from neighbors and businesses in October 2024. Critics have complained drug use is being pushed into neighborhoods. Outside In did not comment what steps are taken to ensure the three block rule is being enforced. The posted sign at the site asks clients to not use or deal drugs within three blocks of the site.

=== Age restricted services ===
Some of the services offered are eligibility restricted to clients 16–24 years of age.

==== Job training ====
"Bespoke" is bicycle-powered smoothie cart set up in Portland's O'Bryant Square that gives homeless youth on-the-job training.

In 2005 the organization set up Virginia Woof, a non-profit dog daycare centre to provide training and employment for their clients. It operates in two locations.

=== Auxiliary services ===
In addition to the fixed location clinic, Outside In's medical clinic operates two medical outreach vans and a school-based health center at Milwaukie High School.

== See also ==
- Emergency shelter
- Homelessness in the United States
