= Eddie Gordon =

- Also known as: West End, EGor, Ed-Did-It
- Born: Edmund Richard Gordon; 9 February 1959 (age 67); Biggin Hill, Farnborough, London, England
- Origin: Kent, England
- Occupation: Music business
- Years active: 1980–retired

Eddie Gordon (born Edmund Richard Gordon; 9 February 1959 in Biggin Hill, Farnborough, Kent) is an English music journalist, producer, DJ and music business personality.

== Early life ==
Born in Biggin Hill, Gordon was raised in Gravesend, Kent. He was educated at Cecil Road Infant and Primary school in Northfleet, Kent and Northfleet School for Boys before attending Gravesend Technical College to study Advanced Level English language and literature.

As a young boy, Gordon passionately collected 45rpm single 7" vinyl records of the 1950s, '60s and '70s, buying them with his secondary school dinner money from his school friends' mothers who had a box of old singles from their younger days collecting dust. Gordon immersed himself in the different styles and emotions of songs on the A and B-sides from the UK and the US.

Aged 13, the first brand-new 45rpm single 7" vinyl record purchased was Michael Jackson's cover version of Bill Withers' "Ain't No Sunshine", released in the UK in May 1972. Playing his collection at home on a Dansette record player, Gordon was fascinated by the song's melodies, the lyrics of love, the ability to paint virtual pictures, and how they resultantly engaged with the listener. Gordon's first DJ experience was in 1974 at the age of 15 in a Northfleet Church hall and later at 16 selecting music at friends' parties.

Early working life. At 16 years old, Gordon completed his secondary education at Northfleet School for Boys in June 1975. December 1975 Gordon took up a new position as a Laboratory Assistant for the aircraft paint manufacturing company Dufay Titanine, based in Northfleet, before moving in 1977 to work as a Laboratory Assistant for Britannia Refined Metals. Early 1980 Gordon was employed by the Royal Mail and stationed at the main Post Office in High Holborn, London WC1. Gordon's last 'normal' job before taking up DJing full-time in 1982. From 1977 to 1980, Gordon took evening classes at Gravesend Technical College to study O Level and then Advanced Level in English Language and English Literature. This period greatly assisted him in writing weekly music reviews for the major record industry.

As music journalist Starting out as a DJ and music journalist in 1982 in his hometown Gravesend, Gordon wrote a weekly column for the Gravesend and Dartford Reporter and Kent Extra before being invited to write a weekly music page for Kent's major county newspaper the Kent Messenger, a position he held from 1982 to 1991. Nine years of weekly Gordon "Sound Spot" columns writing about artists from all genres of music. The Kent Messenger won the Weekly Newspaper of the Year title in the Regional Press Awards for 1988 and went on to collect the title of overall regional newspaper, one of the highest accolades for a paid-for weekly paper in the UK.

Award-Winning DJ: He won multiple regional club and DJ awards between 1984 and 1989 in Kent. Boxing Music Pioneer: He introduced the concept of televised boxer ring-walk music for Frank Warren's ITV shows. Talent Scout: He early-supported legendary DJs like Tim Westwood, Trevor Nelson, Gilles Peterson, and Paul Oakenfold at his club, The Slammer. From 1984 through 1988, Eddie Gordon was regularly booked by major London promoters to support BBC Radio 1 and Capital Radio DJs across the South East of England. This was a highly successful period for Gordon, earning him several awards, including the Gravesend and Dartford Reporter "DJ of the Year" (1984–1985), Radio Kent's "Club of the Year" (1986) for his venue The Slammer, and the Kent Evening Post "Music Man of the Year" (1989).Throughout the 1980s, Gordon was also responsible for introducing ring-walk music for Frank Warren’s boxing shows on ITV. Having boxers emerge from the dressing room to high-energy music to arouse the audience at venues like the Royal Albert Hall eventually became a standard feature of world championship televised boxing. Additionally, from the mid-to-late 1980s, Gordon used his weekly Sounds Spot column in the Kent Messenger newspaper and his Gravesend club night, The Slammer, to spot and support emerging DJ talents who would later become industry icons, including Tim Westwood, Trevor Nelson, Gilles Peterson, Norman Jay, CJ Macintosh, and Paul Oakenfold.

DJ agency In 1985, a local Gravesend DJ Pete Tong personally requested to be added to Gordon's DJ Management/Agency roster which included BBC Radio London's Jeff Young, Radio Kent's Rod Lucas and the UK Club DJ of the Year Colin Hudd. Gordon's agency was the first of its kind in the UK devoted to radio DJs playing dance music. He managed Pete Tong of BBC Radio 1 for 20 years from 1984 to 2004 and Jeff Young of BBC Radio 1 from 1985 to 1992. In 1999, Gordon set up the DJ agency IMD Ltd with DJs Pete Tong and Carl Cox heading the roster with a vision of the worldwide stage for Tong.

The digital era/US Billboard panels 21 September 2002, Gordon was invited by US Billboard magazine as the only European representative to co-chair a closed-room key discussion at the Billboard Summit in New York to discuss the threat of the new world technology to the traditional music business with 69 heads of America's record labels. Eddie opened and closed his participation in this unique meeting by predicting that digital delivery would be 'the future' of the world's music business.

US Billboard Magazine Dance Music Summit 2006 – Las Vegas Wrapup Eddie Gordon (Music 2 Mix) predicted this on a DMS panel more than five years ago to an almost dismissive audience, stressing the importance of building an audience. A vision confirmed 7 months later by the unveiling of Apple's iTunes in March 2003, which is now largest music retailer in the US. 4 Apr 2008. iTunes 'biggest US music seller' group Wal-Mart to become the largest music retailer in the US, an independent study has said...

Gordon has moderated The Future of Digital Distribution at the US Billboard Summit in New York in 2003, attended panels as a speaker in 2004 and 2005 including a keynote speech at the Amsterdam Dance Event (ADE) – MP3 the Future of Music Promotion in Holland.

Gordon moderated a panel at the first Billboard Magazine Summit in Las Vegas on 20 September 2006 titled 'Across the Pond'. "The iPod is the Elvis revolution but the iPod plus the phone will be the Beatles revolution." EG quote at Billboard Magazine Conference, Las Vegas. Sep 2006

== DJinTheMix in London to KINGS of Spins in Los Angeles, US ==
In June 2003, Gordon launched the world's first online digital promotion system for DJs with DJinTheMix which had an exclusive link to the then newly formed iTunes from Apple Inc. The following year, DJinTheMix was nominated as a finalist in the Orange New Business Ventures in London and IMEA at Popkomm in Berlin, Germany. By the turn of 2005, Gordon introduced a new digital marketing service to radio stations worldwide with M2M and in April 2008 launched Media 2 Radio in the US. The promotional work of DJITM to KINGS of Spins has helped to bring awareness and attention to over 25,000 new releases for artists plus record labels from around the world.

== The Grammy Awards ==
From 2010 to 2017, Gordon was invited to be a member of the Electronica/Dance Grammys Screening committee in Los Angeles by the chairman of the panel to assist the selection process for the year's best dance releases.

== The British Broadcasting Corporation ==
Gordon joined BBC Radio 1 as a freelance producer in the early 1990s, and introduced a host of new programming ideas and DJ talent including Pete Tong, Danny Rampling, Judge Jules, Seb Fontaine, Fergie and Carl Cox. For two years from 1995 to 1997, Gordon co-produced Danny Rampling's Saturday evening BBC Radio 1 show The Love Groove Dance Party on alternate weekends with Jeff Young.

== BBC Radio 1: Essential Mix ==
From early 1992, Gordon had been receiving weekly two-hour long mixes on cassette from DJs Tony Humphries on New York's Hot 96 and Frankie Knuckles at KISS 100. Gordon pitched the idea of a UK-based electronic dance music show, with an emphasis on house, that show-cased different DJs and styles of music to offer an outlet for UK dance music. With voice-overs by Pete Tong, the first show was broadcast in 1994, produced by Gordon and airing from 01.00am to 03.00am. The show was subject to scheduling adjustments over the subsequent fifteen years, varying in duration from 2 hours to 3.5 hours, broadcast within the time frame from 01.00am to 06.00am. The show was the first BBC production to broadcast live from Ibiza, Spain. In addition, a one-hour Sunday edition of the programme was broadcast at 7.00pm from April 1992 to April 1993, called The Essential Selection - Part 2. In 1997, IPC-produced magazine Muzik Mag named the show Radio Show of the Year in 1997, and a Sony Silver Award in 1997 for the Goa Mix presented by DJ Paul Oakenfold. Gordon left the show in 2004, when it changed to a different production company. The Essential Mix is presently the longest running radio mix show in the world.

Eddie Gordon took the Essential Mix to Ibiza in 1995. Key Milestones of BBC Radio 1 in Ibiza 1995: Gordon produces the first live BBC show from Ibiza at Ku club, featuring a DJ set by Nicky Holloway 1996: Gordon expands broadcasts to Café del Mar and Amnesia. 1998: Carl Cox's live Terrace set wins two "Essential Mix Show of the Year" awards. 2005: BBC Radio 1 celebrates its 10th anniversary of broadcasting from the island. 2015: The station marks its 20th anniversary with high-profile celebrations.

The Genius Behind the Broadcasts: Eddie Gordon fundamentally changed electronic music history by creating and producing the BBC Radio 1 Essential Mix starting in 1993. The Visionary: He designed a platform that gave DJs total creative freedom for a continuous two-hour set, moving away from rigid commercial radio formats. The Ibiza Gateway: In 1995, he personally traveled to Ibiza to set up the technical infrastructure at Ku club, paving the way for international dance music tourism. A Label Pioneer: Beyond broadcasting, he founded Manifesto Records for Mercury Records in 1994, achieving 14 consecutive UK Top 40 hits and signing the iconic Café del Mar CD compilation series, which sold over 15 million copies globally. Deep Dive: Carl Cox’s Legendary 1998 Set Recorded live on August 9, 1998, on the open-air Space Terrace, Carl Cox's set earned the BBC Radio 1 Essential Mix "Show of the Year" accolade. This specific set transformed Space Ibiza's open terrace into a globally recognized clubbing destination. Featured Anthems from Carl Cox's 1998 Tracklist:"French Kiss" — Lil' Louis"Greece 2000" — Three Drives On A Vinyl "Planet Rock (Zulu Funk Mix)" — Afrika Bambaataa & The Soul Sonic Force" I'll House You (Hitmen Remix)" — Jungle Brothers "The Latin Theme" — Carl Cox "Where Love Lives (Dancing Divaz Mix)" — Alison Limerick The Debut: Nicky Holloway at Ku (1995) On July 2, 1995, UK acid house pioneer Nicky Holloway stepped up to the decks at Ku (now Privilege). It was the very first BBC Radio 1 Ibiza broadcast. The Vibe: An eclectic blend of uplifting Balearic house, energetic techno, and piano house tracks. The Impact: It officially exported the elusive "Ibiza feeling" straight into the bedrooms of millions of UK listeners via the BBC Radio 1 Essential Mix network.

== BBC Radio 1: Millennium ==
From 1998-2000 Gordon was responsible for innovating and delivering his vision of the BBC Radio 1 One World Millennium year 2000 celebration show. Starting with Carl Cox from Bondi Beach in Sydney, Australia, followed by: Danny Rampling in Cape Town, South Africa; Dave Pearce from Glasgow, Scotland; Pete Tong from Liverpool; Junior Vasquez from New York City. Cox and Gordon then took a 9 hour flight westward across the International Date Line (IDL) from Sydney at 4 am 1 January 2000, landing at 8 pm Friday 31 December 1999 in Honolulu to produce final leg of the Millennium celebration at the Kakaako Waterfront Park in Honolulu, Hawaii. This allowed Cox and Gordon to both open and close the broadcast.

== BBC 6 Music ==
From 18 to 23 July 2011, Gordon produced and co-presented a 10-hour radio documentary A Piece of Paradise for the BBC 6 Music on the legendary Manhattan, New York nightclub Paradise Garage and its DJ Larry Levan. The shows were aired in one hour series Monday to Friday at midnight and a special 5-hour show on Saturday featuring a recorded live broadcast from inside the 'Garage in 1979. The show has been repeated by BBC 6 Music three times in entirety.

== Internet radio ==
In 2000 Gordon saw the potential of dual-broadcasting shows via both the radio and the internet, with live audio and video camera images being beamed around the planet on the World Wide Web. Starting in 2000 under his own management and broadcasting from Café Mambo in Ibiza, from 2003 BBC Radio 1 took over the venture, and continue to this day.

== Record labels ==
MCA Records-Universal

In 1988, Gordon was appointed by MCA Records UK Head of Dance A&R Adrian Sykes, as MCA Records' Club Promotion Dance A&R. Together they scored 10 UK top 40 hit records from the R&B urban/dance division. In September 1988, Gordon remixed Bobby Brown's "Don't Be Cruel" with Timmy Regisford in New York for MCA Records UK, helping Bobby Brown to achieve his first top 20 UK hit record off his debut album which sold in excess of 300,000 copies in the UK.

- The Mac Band – Roses Are Red – UK No. 8
- Pebbles – Girlfriend – UK No. 8
- Rose Royce – Carwash – UK No. 8
- Eric B & Rakim – Follow The Leader – UK No. 21
- Pebbles – Mercedes Boy – UK No. 40
- Bobby Brown – Don't Be Cruel – UK No. 13
- Bobby Brown – My Prerogative – UK No. 6
- Bobby Brown – Every Little Step – UK No. 4
- Kraze – The Party – UK No. 29
- The Mac Band – Stalemate – UK No. 40
- Funky Worm – The Hustle – UK No. 13
- Sheena Easton – The Lover in Me – UK No. 15

Motown Records, RCA Records, Arista Records

In 1989, Gordon was appointed as the Head of Dance Music for the labels RCA Records, Arista Records, Motown Records and Deconstruction Records. He promoted 10 hit records into the UK top 40 in this 12-month period including Black Box's "Ride on Time", a No. 1 UK hit for 6 weeks, Lisa Stansfield's "All Around the World" (also a No. 1) and Public Enemy's Fight the Power".

In the studio in 1989, Gordon remixed songs such as Lisa Stansfield's "This Is the Right Time" and "All Around the World", the Temptations' "All I Want from You", Gerald Alston's "Activated", the Blow Monkeys' "This Is Your Life" and "Choice" plus the Alisha Warren song "Touch Me". Gordon also edited the UK radio version of the Aretha Franklin and Whitney Houston song "It Isn't, It Wasn't, It Ain't Never Gonna Be", giving the US company Arista Records their only successful campaign outside of North America with that recording.

Atlantic Records

In 1990, Gordon was signed to WEA Records and was responsible for breaking the US act En Vogue with the record "Hold On", from the million selling album Born to Sing and the Family Stand classic record "Ghetto Heaven" both for Atlantic Records plus having hits with the Atlantic Records House Music giants Ten City with Whatever Makes You Happy and Superficial People whilst on Warner Brothers Gordon enjoyed successful campaigns with Ultra Naté and "It's Over Now", A Way of Life and "Tripping on Your Love", and with The Jungle Brothers' "What U Waitin' 4?" and "Doing Our Own Dang". In the studio Eddie Gordon and CJ Mackintosh remixed the Dr. Dre produced Portrait of A Masterpiece for The D.O.C.

Polydor/Urban Records

In 1991, Gordon was appointed Head of the Urban Division of Polydor Records covering the labels Polydor, M&G, Slamm, Raiders and Love where he went on to help secure hit records for Tony! Toni! Toné! with "It Never Rains in Southern California", Cathy Dennis with "Touch Me (All Night Long)", Just A Little Time and Everybody Move on Polydor Records, Love Inc – Love Is the Message on Love Records as well as Zoé Sunshine on a Rainy Day for M&G Records plus scoring Record Mirror Club No. 1 records for D'Bora Dream and the James Taylor Quartet – Love The Life You Live.

PWL-Sanctuary Records

In late 1992, Gordon was invited into the world-famous recording studios known as The Hit Factory by Pete Waterman and together they produced the UK Single No. 3 hit record, West End feat. Sybil, The Love I Lost for Sanctuary Records. The song also stayed at No. 1 in the UK Club Charts for 4 weeks. Eddie's imprint for PWL, Sanctuary Records, also enjoyed No. 1 UK Club Chart positions with Wag Ya Tail – Xpand Ya Mind, Key West – Looks Like I'm in Love Again and Club Z – I Wanna Be Someone.

Song & Dance Music Promotion

In 1993, Gordon formed a music promotion company called Song & Dance Promotions, achieving numerous No. 1 positions in the UK Club Charts for artists including Whigfield, D-Mob, Lulu, Jon Secada, Dina Carroll, CeCe Peniston, Judy Cheeks, Eternal, Donna Summer, Yazz and KWS.

Manifesto Records

In October 1994, Gordon founded the Manifesto label for Mercury Records UK. Along with Judge Jules, their first 14 Manifesto Records releases were all Top 40 UK hit records. Manifesto Records was Music Week's Dance Label of the Year 1995, 1996 and 1997. Eddie's 1995 signing of the Café del Mar – Ibiza Chill Out CD series for the world made Manifesto Records one of the UK's most successful dance labels of all time with the sales of the Café del Mar albums going over 15 million and they are still selling every summer 15 years later. The success of which created an entire genre of music called Chill-Out or Lounge. Another of Gordon's signings, Jose Padilla went on to be Nominated for a USA Latin Grammy with his second album Horizons. Manifesto Records scored nine #1's in the UK Record Mirror Chart to win the Music Week magazine's dance music label of 1996. One signing, Josh Wink – Higher State of Consciousness, actually hit the UK Top 10 twice at # 7 in consecutive years 1995 and 1996. A feat never to be repeated for an underground techno dance record. Eddie left Manifesto Records in 1997 suffering from exhaustion and feeling that Universal were not totally supportive of the artists or projects signed to the label. Five years later in 2002, Lucian Grainge the chairman and chief executive of Universal Music Group International congratulated Gordon personally for saving Mercury Records UK with the success of the signings to Manifesto Records in-particular the Café del Mar – Ibiza Chill Out CD series which Lucian compared to signing a smaller version of U2, the rock band, due to the income it generated for the company with its multi-million worldwide sales.

- Gusto – Disco's Revenge – UK Club Chart No. 1
- Donna Summer – State of Independence – UK Club Chart No. 1
- Todd Terry – Keep on Jumpin' – UK Club Chart No. 1
- Josh Wink – Higher State of Consciousness – UK Club Chart No. 1
- Dina Carroll – Mind Body & Soul – UK Club Chart No. 1
- David Morales & The Bad Yard Club – In Da Ghetto – UK Club Chart No. 1
- Boris Dlugosch – Keep Pushin On – UK Club Chart No. 1
- Byron Stingily – Get Up Everybody – UK Club Chart No. 1
- Gusto – Let's All Chant – UK Club Chart No. 1

Neo Records

In 1998, Gordon started his independent label Neo Records, succeeding with the biggest selling dance record of the year 2000 with Sandstorm by Darude, licensed for the world and hitting No. 3 in the UK Singles Chart. Another Neo Records signing Ann Lee's 2 Times went one place better at No. 2 in the UK Singles Chart.

== As producer/artist: remixes, production and aliases ==
In an extension to his previous work at the record labels, from 1988 to 1996 Gordon became at first a producer and freelance remixer of various artistes records, and then an artist – as a front man producer and the hub of any "band" – in his own right. The function of both producer and artist was fulfilled under a series of aliases, including: WestEnd; EG; Ed-Did-It; and EGor.

Under these alias labels, Gordon remixed over 75 records for various labels and record companies for mainly the UK, European club scene and North America. This included six records off one album for Eternal from their debut album Always & Forever the songs "Stay", "Crazy", "Just a Step from Heaven", "Sweet Funky Thing", "Save Our Love", and "So Good", all of which went to No. 1 in the UK Club Charts and helped the Eternal album sell 3 million copies.

As West End (not to be confused with the Austrian Eurovision Song Contest entry of 1983), he also enjoyed success with Dina Carroll's "Here", "Ain't No Man" and "Express", Donna Summer's "Melody of Love" and Toni Braxton's "Breathe Again".

== Awards ==
Aside from numerous record label awards with Manifest Records plus Neo Records, and awards for the Essential Mix Radio 1 show, Gordon has enjoyed a successful DJ career with various awards: Gravesend and Dartford Reporter' DJ of the Year 1984–1985, Radio Kent's 1986 Club of the Year with The Slammer, Kent Evening Post' 1986 Club of the Year with The Slammer, 1987 Kent Club of the Year with The Sleeze and in 1989 Gordon was Kent Music Man of the Year. In 2014, Gordon was made a founding member of the Chicago-based American DJ Hall of Fame for his Excellence in the Advancement, Expansion and Acceptance of Dance Music around the World.

== Personal life ==
Gordon currently lives in Malaga, Spain.

== Discography and West End remixes plus productions ==
From 1988 to 1998, Gordon, using the names "West End", "Ed-Did-It" or "EGor", remixed over 75 records for various labels and record companies in the UK music business including six records off one album for Eternal from their debut album Always & Forever the songs "Stay", "Crazy", "Just a Step from Heaven", "Sweet Funky Thing", "Save Our Love", and "So Good", all of which went to No. 1 in the UK Club Charts and helped the Eternal album sell 3 million copies. The UK music charts love affair with girl groups was created from this success. West End also enjoyed Club Chart Number 1 success with Dina Carroll "Here", "Ain't No Man" and "Express", Donna Summer "Melody of Love" and Toni Braxton "Breathe Again". Further information in the discography below.

Discography
Year	Artist	Title	Label	Role	UK Chart
1988	Pebbles	Girlfriend	MCA	Promotion	No. 8
1988	The Mac Band	Roses Are Red	MCA	Promotion	No. 8
1988	Pebbles	Mercedes Boy	MCA	Promotion	No. 42
1988	Rose Royce	Carwash	MCA	A&R, Promotion, RE-EQ	No. 8
1988	The Mac Band	Stalemate	MCA	Promotion	No. 40
1988	Eric B & Rakim	Follow The Leader	MCA	Promotion	No. 21
1988	Bobby Brown	Don't Be Cruel	MCA	Remixing (in New York with Timmy Regisford), A&R, Promotion	No. 13
1988	Sheena Easton	The Lover In Me	MCA	Promotion	No. 15
1988	Kraze	The Party	MCA	A&R, Promotion	No. 29
1988	Funky Worm	Hustle (To the music...)	Fon	Promotion	No. 13
1988	Bobby Brown	My Prerogative	MCA	Promotion	No. 6
1989	Lisa Stansfield	This Is the Right Time	Arista	A&R, Remixing, Promotion	No. 13
1989	Bobby Brown	Every Little Step	MCA	Promotion	No. 4
1989	Lisa Stansfield	All Around the World	Arista	Remixing, A&R, Promotion	No. 1 Club Chart #1
1989	Black Box	Ride On Time	RCA-DeConstruction	Promotion	No. 1 Club Chart #1
1989	The Temptations	All I Want from You	Motown	Remixing	No. 71
1989	Whitney Houston & Aretha Franklin	It Isn't, It Wasn't, It Ain't Never Gonna Be	Arista	EG Exclusive UK Radio edit	No. 29
1989	Glen Goldsmith	One Life	RCA	A&R, Remixing, Promotion	Promotional 12" Mix
1989	Alisha Warren	Touch Me	RCA	A&R, Remixing, Promotion	No. 78
1989	Gerald Alston	Activated	Motown		No. 73
1989	The Blow Monkeys (ft Sylvia Tella)	Choice?	RCA	A&R, Remixing, Promotion	No. 70
1990	Alisha Warren	Discover Me	RCA	A&R, Promotion	No. 96
1990	En Vogue	Hold On	Atlantic	Touring, Promotion	No. 5 Club Chart #1
1990	The Family Stand	Ghetto Heaven	Atlantic	Promotion	No. 10 Club Chart #1
1990	Ten City	Whatever Makes You Happy	Atlantic	Touring, Promotion	No. 25 Club Chart #1
1990	The Jungle Brothers	What U Waiting 4	Atlantic	Promotion	No. 11 Club Chart #1
1990	The Jungle Brothers	Doing Our Own Dang	Atlantic	Promotion	No. 19 Club Chart #1
1990	Harriet	Temple of Love	EastWest	A&R, Remixing, Promotion	No. 100
1990	The D.O.C.	Portrait of a Masterpiece	Atlantic	A&R, Remixing, Promotion	No. 84 Club Chart #1
1991	Nikki (DJ Lady Tribe)	Sexy!	Love/Polydor	Remixing, Promotion	Promotional 12" Mix
1991	Lisa M	People	Polydor	Remixing, Promotion	Promotional 12" Mix
1991	Cathy Dennis	Touch Me (All Night Long)	Polydor	A&R, Promotion	No. 5 Club Chart #1
1991	Cathy Dennis	Just Another Dream	Polydor	Promotion	No. 13 Club Chart #1
1991	Cathy Dennis	Everybody Move	Polydor	Promotion	No. 25 Club Chart #1
1991	Zoe	Sunshine on a Rainy Day	Polydor/M&G	Promotion, A&R	No. 4 Club Chart #1
1991	D'Bora	Dream About You	Polydor/Smash Records/Urban	Promotion, A&R	No. 75 Club Chart #1
1991	Love Inc.	Love is the Message	Polydor/Love Records	Promotion	No. 59 Club Chart #1
1991	Tony! Toni! Tone!	It Never Rains In Southern California	Polydor/Wing	Promotion	No. 69
1992	West End	Never	Republic	Writer/Performer/Producer	A&R, Promotion
1992	The Orange	The Fuchsia Is Orange	Radikal	A&R, Remixing, Promotion	album released in Canada
1992	LUST	Music of the Future	XS Rhythm	A&R, Remixing, Promotion	Promotional 12"
1993	Army of Lovers	Crucified	M&G	A&R, Promotion	47
1993	Lance Ellington	Lonely 'Have We Lost Our Love'	RCA	Remixing, Promotion	Promotional 12"
1993	Disco Anthem	Scream	MCA	A&R, Remixing, Promotion	No. 47 Club Chart #1
1993	Key West	Looks Like I'm In Love Again	Sanctuary/PWL	A&R, Remixing, Promotion	No. 46 Club Chart #1
1993	Wag Ya Tail	Xpand Ya Mind	Sanctuary/PWL	A&R, Remixing, Promotion	No. 49 Club Chart #1
1993	West End ft Sybil	The Love I Lost	Sanctuary/PWL	A&R, Remixing, Promotion	No. 3 Club Chart # 1 five weeks
1993	Simone Angel	Walk On Water	AM:PM	Remixing, Promotion	Promotional 12"
1993	Cardiac Swing	D' Yer Mak' Er	BMG Eurodisc	A&R, Remixing, Promotion	Promotional 12"
1993	Rodeo Jones	Surrender	A&M	Remixing, Promotion	Promotional 12"
1993	Toni Braxton	Breathe Again	Arista	Remixing, Promotion	No. 2
1993	Third World	Now That We Found Love	Island	A&R, Remixing, Promotion	DMC DJ 12" release
1993	Annabella Lwin	Car Sex	Sony	A&R, Remixing, Promotion	No. 88
1993	Pauline Henry	Can't Take Your Love	Sony	A&R, Remixing, Promotion	No. 30
1993	Jon Secada	Do You Really Want Me	SBK/EMI	A&R, Remixing, Promotion	No. 30
1993	Jon Secada	If You Go	SBK/EMI	A&R, Remixing, Promotion	No. 39
1993	Bad Boys Inc	Don't Talk About Love	A&M	A&R, Remixing, Promotion	No. 19
1993	Bad Boys Inc	More To This World	A&M	A&R, Remixing, Promotion	No. 8
1993	Dina Carroll	Express	AM:PM	A&R, Remixing, Promotion	No. 12
1993	Pauline Henry	Feel Like Making Love	Sony	A&R, Remixing, Promotion	No. 12 Club Chart #1
1993	Ava Cherry	Gimme Gimme	Pulse8	A&R, Remixing, Promotion	Promotional 12" Club Chart #1
1993	Dina Carroll	Here	A&M	A&R, Remixing, Promotion	Promotional 12" Club Chart # 1
1993	Kim Wilde	In My Life	MCA	Remixing, Promotion	No. 54
1993	Michelle Gayle	Looking Up	BMG	A&R, Remixing, Promotion	No. 11
1993	Michelle Gayle	Sweetness	RCA	A&R, Remixing, Promotion	No. 4 Club Chart #1
1994	CeCe Peniston	"Keep Givin' Me Your Love"	A&M	A&R, Remixing, Promotion	No. 36 Club Chart #1
1994	Dina Carroll	Ain't No Man	AM:PM	A&R, Remixing, Promotion	No. 12 Club Chart #1
1994	Mary J. Blige	Real Love	MCA/Uptown	Remixing, Promotion	No. 8
1994	Judy Cheeks	So In Love	Positiva	A&R, Remixing, Promotion	No. 27 Club Chart #1
1994	Joe	All or Nothing	Mercury	Remixing, Promotion	No. 56
1994	Richard Darbyshire	Wherever Love Is Found	SBK Records	Remixing, Promotion	No. 86
1994	MN8	I've Got A Little Something For You	Columbia	A&R, Remixing, Promotion	No. 02
1994	Teena Marie	I Need Your Loving	Motown	Remixing, Promotion	DMC DJ 12"
1994	Jocelyn Brown & Kym Mazelle	No More Tears	Arista	A&R, Remixing, Promotion	No. 13
1994	Sinitta	Naughty Naughty	Simon Cowell/BMG	A&R, Remixing, Promotion	Promotional album track
1994	Diana Ross	Chain Reaction	EMI/Motown	Remixing, Promotion	No. 20
1994	Eternal	Stay	EMI	A&R, Remixing, Promotion	No. 4 Club Chart #1
1994	Eternal	Just a Step from Heaven	EMI	A&R, Remixing, Promotion	No. 8 Club Chart #1
1994	Eternal	Sweet Funky Thing	EMI	A&R, Remixing, Promotion	UK Club Chart #1
1994	Eternal	Save Our Love	EMI	A&R, Remixing, Promotion	No. 8 Club Chart #1
1995	Eternal	So Good	EMI	A&R, Remixing, Promotion	No. 13 Club Chart
1995	Shiva	Work It Out	FFRR	Remixing, Promotion	No. 36 Club Chart #1
1995	Kylie Minogue	Where Is The Feeling?	Deconstruction/BMG	A&R, Remixing, Promotion	No. 16 Club Chart #1
1995	Donna Summer	Melody Of Love	Casablanca/Mercury	A&R, Remixing, Promotion	No. 21 Club Chart #1
1995	Donna Summer	I Feel Love	Manifesto/Mercury	A&R, RE-EQ, Promotion	No. 8 Club Chart #1
1995	West End	Love Rules	RCA BMG	A&R, Remixing, Promotion	No. 44 Club Chart #1
1996	Mary Kiani	Let The Music Play	Mercury	A&R, Remixing, Promotion	No. 19 Club Chart #1
1996	Mary Kiani	When I Call Your Name	Mercury	A&R, Remixing, Promotion	No. 18 Club Chart #1
1996	Mary Kiani	I Imagine	Mercury	A&R, Remixing, Promotion	No. 35 Club Chart #1
1996	Mary Kiani	100%	Mercury	A&R, Remixing, Promotion	No. 23 Club Chart #1
1996	Mary Kiani	With Or Without You	Mercury	A&R, Remixing, Promotion	No. 46 Club Chart #1
1996	Donna Summer	State of Independence	Manifesto/Mercury	A&R, Remixing, Promotion	No. 13 Club Chart #1
1996	Hondy	No Access	Manifesto/Mercury	A&R, Remixing, Promotion	26 Club Chart #1
1997	Karen Ramirez	Looking for Love	Manifesto/Mercury	A&R, Remixing, Promotion	No. 6 Club Chart #1
1998	The Thrillseekers ft Sheryl Deane	Synaethesia (Vocal Version)	NEO	A&R, Remixing, Promotion	No. 28
1999	Dina Carroll	Without Love	Mercury	A&R	No. 13
