= When I Call Your Name =

When I Call Your Name may refer to:

- When I Call Your Name (album), a 1989 album by American country music singer Vince Gill
  - "When I Call Your Name" (Vince Gill song), this album's title track
- "When I Call Your Name" (Mary Kiani song), a 1995 song by Scottish dance singer Mary Kiani
