= Dominator (The Time Frequency album) =

Studio album by The Time Frequency
- Released: 1994
- Recorded: 1990–1994
- Genre: Dance, techno
- Label: Internal Affairs
- Producer: Jon Campbell; Steven Nelson

The Time Frequency chronology
Dominator (1994)	TTF - The Ultimate Collection (2007)

Professional ratings
Review scores
Source	Rating
Music Week	3/5 stars

Dominator is the debut album by Scottish techno band the Time Frequency, released in 1994. The album reached number 23 on the UK Albums Chart, and No. 7 on the Scottish Albums Chart. In 2017, the album was reissued as a Special Edition double-disc album with bonus tracks on CD1 and remixes, B-sides and demo tracks on CD2. A second album Dominator 2 was released in 2008, 14 years later.

== Track listings ==
All tracks are written by Jon Campbell, except where noted.

No.	Title	Writer(s)	Lead vocals	Length
1.	"Euphoria"		instrumental	5:44
2.	"The Ultimate High"		Mary Kiani	4:55
3.	"New Emotion"		Kiani	3:42
4.	"Jurassic Park"	John Williams	instrumental	3:34
5.	"Supernature"	Marc Cerrone, Alain Wisniak, Lene Lovich	Kiani, Jon Campbell	4:25
6.	"Real Love"		Kiani, Campbell	4:00
7.	"Retribution"		Campbell	4:22
8.	"Such a Phantasy"		Monica Reed-Price	3:35
9.	"Energy Rush"	Alastair Angus, Gordon Tennant	instrumental	4:24
10.	"Something for Me"	Jon Campbell, Steven Nelson	instrumental	3:35
11.	"Popcorn"	Gershon Kingsley	instrumental	4:24
12.	"Maximum Intensity"		instrumental	3:07

=== Special edition ===
In 2017, the album was reissued by Emotiv Records. It appends four bonus tracks to disc 1, as well as including a second disc with B-sides, previously unreleased tracks and demos.

Bonus tracks
No.	Title	Writer(s)	Length
13.	"You Take Me Away"		5:37
14.	"The Bounce"		4:55
15.	"Supernature" (12" version)	Cerrone, Wisniak, Lovich	5:12
16.	"Schizoid"		3:58

Disc 2
No.	Title	Writer(s)	Length
1.	"Utopia"		3:51
2.	"Real Love" (instrumental demo)		3:11
3.	"Xlerator" (demo)		3:31
4.	"The Powerzone"		3:36
5.	"Future Rhythm"		3:44
6.	"NRG 4 U & Me"	Campbell, R. Hughes	4:55
7.	"Futurama"		4:20
8.	"Higher Than Heaven"		5:27
9.	"Something For Me" (demo)	Campbell, Nelson	4:32
10.	"Theme From Great Cities"	Simple Minds	3:39
11.	"Exosphere"		4:34
12.	"The Hardcore Bounce"		3:41
13.	"Fade to Grey"	Billy Currie, Chris Payne, Midge Ure	3:21
14.	"Dreamaker"		2:20
15.	"Dreamscape"		3:30
16.	"Buy Me" (remix)	Kit Cummings	3:30

== Cover versions ==
- Track 4 is a cover of the theme music to Jurassic Park by John Williams
- Track 5 is a cover of "Supernature" by Cerrone
- Track 9 is a cover of "Energy Rush" by Suburban Delay
- Track 11 is a cover of "Popcorn" by Hot Butter
- Track 25 is a cover of "Fade to Grey" by Visage
