= Tom Wilson (DJ) =

Scottish radio disc jockey (1951–2004)

Tom Wilson (9 October 1951 – 25 March 2004) was a Scottish radio disc jockey, best remembered for his longtime contribution to the Scottish dance music scene. He worked variously with N-Trance, the Time Frequency, Belinda Carlisle, Ice MC, Scooter, Mary Kiani and DJ Dado.

His dance music show, Steppin' Out, started in 1985 and ran for fourteen years on Radio Forth, Forth RFM and Forth FM. Although the show was only broadcast to East and Central Scotland, tapes of the show were sent all over the world, hence the reason there were requests from listeners in Australia, Canada and Hong Kong. Due to the success of his show and the Scottish dance music boom, Wilson's Bonus Beats programme aired on Forth FM during the mid-1990s. This allowed many local DJs the opportunity to provide one-hour mixes, spawning the growth of Tartan techno.

== Early days ==
In 1972, Wilson started his broadcasting career in pirate radio on such stations as Radio Caroline Scotland and Radio Telstar. Later in 1984, he began answering phones for the Transistor Boogie show presented by Graham Jackson. From 1985 the first of what turned out to be Wilson's dance music shows on Forth FM came to air across East and Central Scotland. For fifteen years through the mid-1980s and into the 1990s, he presented Steppin' Out, which went on to win several awards.

As well as being a radio presenter, he was also a record producer and achieved some considerable chart success with ten singles, one of which "Techno Cat" reached the Top 40 in the UK. He was responsible for the Bouncing Beats compilation releases, and also spent time remixing material for N-Trance and Belinda Carlisle.

== Back to Radio Forth ==
Having spent some time working at other Scottish radio stations, he returned to Radio Forth in 2003 as the station's Head of Music for both FM (Forth 1) and AM (Forth 2) stations, and hosted two shows per week, including Old Skool. In addition, away from music, Wilson was a fan of Heart of Midlothian F.C.

== Bouncin' Back ==
Wilson was also a nightclub DJ, appearing across the country at numerous clubs and events such as Awesome 101, Fantazia, Rezerection and The Fubar. He also became a record producer, producing "Techno Cat" which, billed as Techno Cat featuring Tom Wilson, became a top 40 hit on the UK Singles Chart. It also charted in several European countries. In addition his track, "Let Your Body Go", spent one week at #60 in the UK chart in March 1996. Wilson also put together several compilation albums, namely the Bouncin' Back and Bouncin' Beats series. After a brief spell working at several other Scottish radio stations, including Beat 106 and Real Radio, Wilson rejoined Radio Forth in 2003 as head of music for both Forth One and Forth 2, and hosted two weekly shows including the Old Skool show on a Sunday evening.

== Gigs ==
Wilson was popular on the club circuit, attending many prominent dance music events including 1992's SECC based 'Big Bang' event. The 1990s saw Wilson headlining the biggest dance festivals across Scotland, such as Livingston Forum's Awesome 101 and Ingliston's Rezerection.

== Death ==
Radio Forth announced the death of Tom Wilson - father of four children; Lynsey, Stephanie, Craig and Allex- on 25 March 2004, at Edinburgh's Western General Hospital following a heart attack, and a short period of illness.

His memorial service was held on 31 March 2004. His will requested that every man attending the service should wear a maroon tie, the colour worn by his favourite football team, and that donations should be given to the British Heart Foundation.
