= Bouncy techno =

Subgenre of happy hardcore

- Stylistic origins: Gabber; acid house; new beat; breakbeat hardcore; 4-beat; Italo house
- Cultural origins: 1990s; United Kingdom, Netherlands and Germany
- Derivative forms: UK hardcore; hard bounce; hardbass

Regional scenes
- Japan; United Kingdom; Netherlands; Germany; Russia

Other topics
- Bassline

Bouncy techno is a hardcore dance music rave style that developed in the early 1990s from Scotland and Northern England. Described as an accessible gabber-like form, it was popularised by Scottish DJ and music producer Scott Brown under numerous aliases and Ultra-Sonic who were formed in Ayrshire.

The sound became prominent in the northern United Kingdom rave scene before it broke into the hardcore homeland of the Netherlands through Dutch DJ and music producer Paul Elstak, where it became known there as happy hardcore or happy gabber (Note: Happy hardcore could refer to at least two types of music of different origin. The term hardcore itself, in the early 1990s, encompassed unrelated music such as breakbeat and gabber; determined purely by location. As a result, happy hardcore could be happy breakbeat or happy gabber. The Energy Flash book defines happy hardcore as breakbeat music only (related to jungle), whilst happy gabber is used interchangeably with bouncy techno.) and funcore (Note: Funcore was a Dutch term to classify what was essentially bouncy techno. Babyboom Records defined itself as "The Funcore Label"; Scottish artists released music on the same Dutch record label. The funcore term was found on other labels but to a lesser extent.).

A subsequent mainstream-aimed Eurodance tangent appeared in Germany and itself back into the Netherlands. Scott Brown's music also changed the Southern England happy breakbeat style away from its breakbeat foundation and into a bouncy derivative. These different country entrails created a single pan European hardcore briefly in the mid-1990s. Bouncy techno rapidly declined from this point for a variety of reasons.

== History ==
=== Antecedents: early 1990s ===
The breakbeat hardcore style that dominated raves across England was generally not popular in Scotland. This is attributed to regional music, cultural and racial differences across the UK; with breakbeat regarded in Scotland as a "black English thing" and an "alien musical culture".

The few Scottish-based DJs who supported this music found it difficult to be booked locally. DJ Kid told the crowd to "fuck off" on the mic before he stormed off stage when ravers turned hostile towards him playing such a set. A divide in the United Kingdom rave scene occurred as a result with separate musical paths of development.

Scotland instead favoured techno and vocal/piano music at raves. The Time Frequency (TTF) led the charge of local bands. After three chart hit records in the UK Singles Chart Top 40 across 1993, which peaked with "Real Love" at number eight, their commercial success in part resulted in a backlash against the band. With the vocal/piano approach now tainted, ravers turned their attention to an alternative form of underground music that had since materialised.

=== Origins: early to mid 1990s ===
==== Scotland and Northern England ====
Bass Generator introduced the gabber style to northern ravers. These sets would prove popular and earned him Best Rave DJ and Best UK DJ by Clubscene readers for 1993. To keep crowds receptive, the slower and softer vocal/piano anthems would also be played but unorthodoxly mixed at greatly increased speeds to match them to the much faster and aggressive gabber. This created a peculiar clash of styles; an early template of what would become bouncy techno (this concoction was something he would eventually release as "The Event" (1993)).

Scott Brown is one of the world's most important producers. He has single-handedly changed the sound of hardcore and now people everywhere are copying his sound.

— Lenny Dee, (February 1995)

With a potential new avenue, Scott Brown reinterpreted the gabber sound into a more accessible interpretation for local audiences. His Bass X "Hardcore Disco" track in 1993 was the first hardcore release in Scotland (and the UK). The runner-up Best Scottish Dance Record for 1993 set the trend in Scotland; followed-up by his Dance Overdose remix in a similar fashion. Other local acts replicated this popular winning formula. Even The Time Frequency also got in on the act and anonymously released "The Bounce" (1993) to fool their critics.

Brown and his sound was propelled to the forefront of the hardcore scene in Scotland and abroad. In the year of 1994, Brown released 27 x 12" vinyl records under assorted aliases across 10 labels, 2 x compilation LPs, 22 x remix credits and launched five record labels under his Evolution Records stable; the majority of this music in his bouncy techno style.

Local artists and DJs soon appeared in Western Europe, Australia and Japan; Q-Tex (Brown) and Ultra-Sonic played at the Mayday music festivals in Germany of 1994. Other factors in the style's exposure included DJ Carl Cox who played the founding Shoop! Records releases at raves; and DJ Tom Wilson's award-winning Steppin' Out dance music radio show that captured 82% of the available listening audience during Saturday evenings on Forth FM.

==== Netherlands and Germany ====
In the Netherlands, Paul Elstak felt that their own gabber was caught in a race to be the hardest at the expense of quality. He found a new direction with Bass Reaction "Technophobia" (1993); another production from Brown. It brought an unexpected cheerful melody to the heavy undercurrent. The track was re-released for the Dutch market in 1994, where its success inspired Elstak and others to produce the same less frenetic sound, which became known there as happy hardcore (i.e.: happy gabber).

Dutch labels dedicated to the "new rage" appeared such as Babyboom, Pengo, Waxweazle and Elstak's own Forze Records. Ironically, Brown's initial attempts to front Combined Forces new label venture was considered too hard in the Dutch landscape that he had changed. They expected music in Brown's own style and not that of gabber.

Concurrently, the Scottish duo Ultra-Sonic unconventionally combined the slower piano approach with the faster Brown-type beat; "Annihilating Rhythm" won Best Scottish Dance Record for 1993. The act claimed it "changed the face of dance music". The track became the inspiration for Scooter "Hyper Hyper" (1994) and Charly Lownoise and Mental Theo "Live at London" (1994). Both were the first such musical chart entries in Germany and the Netherlands respectively.

A lot of people [in Germany] have tried to copy this style and make it cheap. All this stuff like Dune and Scooter, these kind of sounds are the worst! Scooter is basically like an Ultra-Sonic rip off.

— WestBam, (March 1996)

These successes created a path for further mainstream music to be exploited. Scooter achieved much commercial chart success around western Europe; Ultra-Sonic claimed that Scooter were "ripping us off". Elstak meanwhile enlisted people in the eurodance field to produce a chart hit for him. Importantly, this particular music was not happy hardcore itself but alternative eurodance versions created for radio airplay in the style of Culture Beat.

==== Southern England ====
Bouncy techno had already been supported in small numbers at raves in England by the like of DJs Brisk, Chris C and Ramos.

Happy breakbeat DJs such as Dougal and Vibes initially introduced bouncy techno tracks to their breakbeat mix sets; Scott Brown Versus DJ Rab S "Now is the Time" (1995) release being a catalyst. Artists in this field started to add bouncy techno characteristics to their compositions, which created a new type of happy breakbeat music.

Several happy breakbeat labels created offshoots dedicated to bouncy techno, such as Bounce! Records from Happy Vibes Recordings in late 1995. These labels would quickly become redundant as happy breakbeat itself developed in a similar light.

=== Decline: mid 1990s ===
With the influence now found across several different markets, a single pan European hardcore was formed. This was however short lived. Due to several drug related deaths at Hanger 13 that attracted national press and parliamentary debate, local authorities in Scotland clamped down on raves and clubs switched to house music.

The Metropolis, one of the leading venues for bouncy techno, dropped the music in 1996 due to its clown-suited PA scene and regarded it as "timewarp techno" (a word play of tartan techno). Ultra-Sonic similarly stated that "someone [Brown] came up with a style of music" that everyone copied and "nothing new was evolving" as a result.

The new bouncy techno influenced happy breakbeat from Southern England was heavily pushed in Scotland as the next big thing but with little success. Bass Generator singled it out as having "killed the music scene up north" as it was an advanced form of breakbeat so was never going to work.

Rezerection closed its doors in 1997 as interest dwindled. Synonymous with the rave scene and hardcore music; the two were inseparable. Brown said of the promotion's demise that "Scottish 'bouncy' hardcore is almost a thing of the past" and looked to expand his horizons to other music. Bass Generator's own Judgement Day looked to fill their void with a traditional Hogmanay rave to specifically kick-start a bouncy techno revival for 1998.

In Netherlands, hardcore fans became tired of funcore and felt betrayed by Elstak's subsequent chart forays. Dutch producers reverted to gabber after a final few parting shots with releases like Chico Chipolata "No More Happy Hardcore" (1996), Buzz Fuzz "Fuck Happy" (1997); whilst Bodylotion "Happy Is Voor Hobos" (1996) alternated between droll bouncy and no-nonsense gabber parts to get their message across.

=== Relaunch: late 1990s ===
As an alternative to the now formulaic music from Southern England, Brown launched the Bouncy Techno label in 1998. Plagued by distribution problems, the imprint revealed a new uplifting trance approach to his work. Brown's "Elysium" (1999) helped revitalise the domestic rave scene to much success.

Producers picked up on Brown's lead, as others had done in the past. In the early 2000s, labels that included Quosh Records and Higher Order Recordings would release music with a bouncy techno influence. These would be subsumed into what became generically known as UK hardcore.

Throwback events had also appeared in the 2000s such as Back to the Future and Fantazia in Scotland, and Happy Hardcore in Netherlands. Kutski dedicated several sets to bouncy techno on his BBC Radio 1 show, like the Rezerection Free Range Mix in 2011.

== Characteristics ==
Typical compositions have a tempo of 160 to 180 BPM, and use a 4/4 signature. Tracks can be instrumental, or use a short repeated sample at certain points. Singing is uncommon. Brown uses a regimented structure with components occurring for a fixed length. e.g.: beat solo, bouncy with beat, hi-hat added, riff solo, riff with beat, hi-hat added, etc. each lasting 8-bars. These parts would be pieced together with short fills and rolls. Drum kicks are slightly distorted, like gabber. Breakbeat patterns may also occur briefly in the background at certain points.

Whilst breakbeat hardcore itself was not popular in Scotland, its synthesiser sounds were found in bouncy techno's range of stab melodies. N-Joi's "Live in Manchester" (1992) feast provided further general inspiration. Its hallmark is the single-keyed offbeat note, which relates to its 'bouncy' designation (this offbeat focus was found in the latter bouncy house namesake). These rhythmic combinations and arrangements were described by Simon Reynolds as being reminiscent of klezmer music, fairground-like melodies and oom-pah offbeat notes.

The N-Joi group provided another important attribute. Unlike other rave music from this period, the Scottish scene was performance driven where bands often headlined raves rather than DJs. Acts were expected to have costumes, dancers and the best stage performance. Dancers were dressed in baggy tracksuit-like attire and had their own form of dance that involves a lot of rapid leg movements. The performances of Ultra-Sonic filtered through to the like Scooter on a wider level.

== See also ==
- List of electronic music genres

== Further information ==
- Reynolds, Simon (1998). Energy Flash: A Journey Through Rave Music and Dance Culture. Picador. p. 493. ISBN 0-330-35056-0.
- Presdee, Mike (2000). Cultural Criminology and the Carnival of Crime. Routledge. pp. 120. ISBN 0-415-23910-9.
- Van Gageldonk, Paul (2000). De Gabberstory: Het Verhaal van DJ Paul en DJ Rob (in Dutch). LJ Veen. p. 200. ISBN 90-204-5681-4.
- Jeremic, Nikolaus (2003). Techno: Entwicklung und Erscheinungsform einer Jugendkultur der 90er Jahre (in German). GRIN Verlag GmbH. p. 25. ISBN 978-3-638-21923-5.
- Borthwick, Stuart (2004). Popular Music Genres. Edinburgh University Press. p. 202. ISBN 0-7486-1745-0.
- Brown, Scott (2008). Scott Brown: Livewired (DVD). United Kingdom: Evolution Records.
