= Just a Step from Heaven =

1994 single by Eternal

Single by Eternal

from the album Always & Forever
- B-side: "I've Got to Be with You"; "Fantasy"
- Released: 18 April 1994
- Studio: Roundhouse (London, England)
- Genre: R&B-pop; hip hop soul
- Length: 3:57
- Label: EMI; 1st Avenue
- Songwriters: Wayne Cohen; Sheppard Solomon
- Producers: Dennis Charles; Ronnie Wilson

Eternal singles chronology
"Save Our Love" (1994)	"Just a Step from Heaven" (1994)	"So Good" (1994)

"Just a Step from Heaven" is a song by British girl group Eternal, released as the third single from their debut album, Always & Forever (1993). Released on 18 April 1994 by EMI and 1st Avenue Records, the single was well received by music critics, entering at number 12 on the UK Singles Chart on 24 April. It climbed to its peak of number eight three weeks later and spent a total of 11 weeks on the UK Singles Chart. It also reached the top 30 in Ireland and New Zealand and experienced minimal success in North America. The song was written by Wayne Cohen and Sheppard Solomon, and produced by Dennis Charles and Ronnie Wilson. Its accompanying music video was directed by Matthew Rolston.

== Critical reception ==
Jon O'Brien from AllMusic complimented the song as an example of "perfect R&B-infused pop". Upon the release, Larry Flick from Billboard magazine wrote, "A glowing moment from the noteworthy Always & Forever album, this midtempo jam chugs along with rich harmonies, a diva-driven lead vocal, and an arrangement that pads a hip-hop foundation with sweet retro-soul nuances and a killer chorus. Juicy." The Stud Brothers from Melody Maker praised the song as "glorious", adding, "With that song and that video, Eternal — a band hitherto known for ersatz soul and the mildest of swingbeat — prove that Brit R&B can be as exhilarating and stylish as its American counterpart."

Sam Steele from NME remarked, "An innocuous uptempo luurve ballard, 'Just a Step...' drapes its perfect soul curves over some barely audible hip-hop scratching, swells into one of those swoonsome string laden choruses and generally sounds stunning in a superfluous supermodel kind of way." Mark Frith from Smash Hits gave it a top score of five out of five and named it Best New Single, commenting, "At first I wasn't very sure about this. Not as sultry and soully as 'Stay', missing the great infectious pop energy of 'Save Our Love'. After listen number five it strikes you — this has the best of both and is the pick of the bunch. Sassy, well-sung and a little bit funky, 'Just a Step from Heaven' is another big hit. And the video, directed by the person behind the Salt N Pepa/En Vogue 'Whatta Man' promo, is meant to be a little special too. We've probably lost them to America but Eternal are a jewel well worth keeping."

== Music video ==
The music video for "Just a Step from Heaven" was directed by American artist, photographer, director and creative director Matthew Rolston. The Stud Brothers from Melody Maker commented, "Have you seent that video? The one that accompanies Eternal's 'Just a Step from Heaven'. The one that quite literally kicks off with a gang of kids tearing through an urban wasteland, then cuts to an anthracite-haired goddess, standing at a university podium, delivering a gospel-tinged sermon on self-love, beneath the intimidating clenched-fist of the Black Panther movement. Now that is one serious f*** video. Packaged rebellion, for sure, but what packaging." Easther Bennett of Eternal told in an interview, "Without that video, the song could easily been interpreted as some boy/girl thing. With the video, we stress a greater kind of love and pride. We ask people to see strength in themselves and use it in a positive way."

== Track listings ==
- UK and Australian CD single
1. "Just a Step from Heaven" (radio mix)
2. "Stay" (Teddy Riley remix)
3. "I've Got to Be with You"
4. "Fantasy"
- UK 7-inch and cassette single
1. "Just a Step from Heaven" (remix)
2. "I've Got to Be with You"
3. "Stay" (Teddy Riley "Eternal" remix)
- UK 12-inch single

A1. "Just a Step from Heaven" (West End Wild & Groovy mix)
A2. "Just a Step from Heaven" (West End RnB Rub mix)
B1. "Just a Step from Heaven" (Frankie Foncett mix)
B2. "Stay" (Teddy Riley remix)

- US cassette single

A1. "Just a Step from Heaven"
B1. "I've Got to Be with You"
B2. "Stay" (extended mix)

- Japanese mini-CD single
1. "Just a Step from Heaven" (radio mix)
2. "Stay" (Teddy Riley remix)

== Credits and personnel ==
Credits are lifted from the Always & Forever album booklet.

Studios

- Recorded at Roundhouse Recording Studios (London, England)
- Mixed at RG Jones Recording Studios (London, England)

Personnel

- Wayne Cohen – writing
- Sheppard Solomon – writing
- Dennis Charles – production
- Ronnie Wilson – production
- Johnny Douglas – additional production and remix

== Charts ==
=== Weekly charts ===
Chart (1994–1995)	Peak position
Australia (ARIA)	62
Canada Top Singles (RPM)	84
Europe (Eurochart Hot 100)	38
Europe (European Dance Radio)	5
Europe (European Hit Radio)	30
Ireland (IRMA)	26
Israel (Israeli Singles Chart)	6
Netherlands (Dutch Top 40 Tipparade)	12
Netherlands (Single Top 100 Tipparade)	4
New Zealand (Recorded Music NZ)	29
Scottish Singles Sales (Official Charts)	18
UK Singles (Official Charts)	8
UK Airplay (Music Week)	5
UK Dance (Music Week)	12
UK Club Chart (Music Week)	2
US Bubbling Under Hot R&B Singles (Billboard)	15

=== Year-end charts ===
Chart (1994)	Position
UK Singles (OCC)	69
UK Airplay (Music Week)	20
UK Club Chart (Music Week)	29

== Release history ==
Region	Date	Format(s)	Label(s)	Ref.
United Kingdom	18 April 1994	7-inch vinyl; 12-inch vinyl; CD; cassette	EMI; 1st Avenue	
Japan	6 July 1994	Mini-CD	EMI	
Australia	28 November 1994	CD; cassette	EMI; 1st Avenue	
