= Long Hard Funky Dreams =

Studio album by Mary Kiani
- Released: 27 January 1997
- Studios: The Planet, Olympic Studios, Ten Forward Studios, Tulipsound, Julio Time Studios
- Genres: Dance, pop
- Length: 62:48
- Labels: 1st Avenue Records; Mercury Records
- Producers: Lord 'N Elliot; Dr. Ju; Eddy Fingers; Steve DuBerry; One World

Mary Kiani chronology
Long Hard Funky Dreams (1997)	The Sydney Sessions (2006)

Long Hard Funky Dreams is the debut album by Scottish dance music singer Mary Kiani, released on 27 January 1997. All five singles from the album were hits on the UK Singles Chart, as well as on the Scottish Singles and UK Dance Singles charts, with lead single "When I Call Your Name" proving the most successful.

== Track listing ==
Long Hard Funky Dreams
#	Title	Length	Writers
1.	"When I Call Your Name"	4:18	Kevan Frost, Marc Lord, Bruce Elliot-Smith, Zee Cowling
2.	"Till Death Do Us Disco"	5:30	Daniel Sherman, Märy Kiani, Lord, Elliot-Smith
3.	"With or Without You" (Planet Album Mix)	5:16	U2
4.	"Long Hard Funky Dreams"	5:10	Kiani, Lord, Elliot-Smith
5.	"If I See You Again"	4:30	Jeff Franzel, Russ DeSalvo
6.	"Let the Music Play"	3:56	Chris Barbosa, Ed Chisolm
7.	"We Can Be One"	3:35	Kiani, Zee, Lord, Elliot-Smith
8.	"100%"	3:39	Mike Percy, Pam Sheyne, Tim Lever
9.	"I Imagine"	3:54	Lord, Elliot-Smith, Zee
10.	"Blame It on the Night"	4:30	Steve DeBerry, Julia Taylor Stanley
11.	"I Knew"	3:32	
12.	"Beautiful Day"	4:10	Kiani, McNulty
13.	"Memories"	5:38	Kiani, Lord, Elliot-Smith
14.	"I Give It All to You"	4:14	Albert Hammond, DuBerry

A limited edition of the album was released with a second CD with mixes of the songs from the album, most of them previously available on the single releases' different formats. Some of these appear for the first time on CD. See below for track listing of the bonus CD.

Long Hard Funky Dreams Bonus CD
#	Title	Length
1.	"When I Call Your Name" [Hardfloor Vocal Mix]	8:00
2.	"Let the Music Play" [Perfecto Vocal Mix]	8:00
3.	"I Imagine" [Mr. Spring Club Mix]	7:50
4.	"100%" [Tall Paul Remix]	6:40
5.	"Let the Music Play" [Union Jack Mix]	6:26
6.	"I Give It All to You" [Umboza Mix]	8:20
7.	"When I Call Your Name" [Motiv8 Special Club Mix]	6:32
