= So Good (Eternal song) =

1994 single by Eternal

Single by Eternal

from the album Always & Forever
- B-side: "Ain't No How I'm Steppin"; "Loving You"
- Released: 8 August 1994
- Studio: Sarm (London, England)
- Genre: Pop; soul
- Length: 3:50
- Label: EMI; 1st Avenue
- Songwriter: Eternal
- Producer: Nigel Lowis

Eternal singles chronology
| "Just a Step from Heaven" (1994) | "So Good" (1994) | "Oh Baby I..." (1994) |

Alternative cover
- UK CD2

"So Good" is a song by English R&B girl group Eternal, released on 8 August 1994 by EMI and 1st Avenue Records as the fourth single from their debut album, Always & Forever (1993). It was written by the group and produced by Nigel Lowis, becoming Eternal's first single to miss the top 10 of the UK Singles Chart, peaking at No. 13 on 21 August 1994. The single was also a top-50 hit in New Zealand. Tim Royes directed the accompanying music video, which was filmed in New York City. The single also peaked at No.1 in Ireland, becoming the groups first chart topper at home or in international charts.

== Critical reception ==
Annette M. Lai from the Gavin Report described 'So Good' as "very catchy". In his weekly UK chart commentary, James Masterton wrote, "If anything this single is one of their best yet, more of a straight pop song than any of the others and the sort of track that is best appreciated on the car radio on a blazing hot day with the top down. In effect they have timed it to perfection." Pan-European magazine Music & Media commented, "Not so good as 'Stay', but as long as the intention is real, they'll come a long way. The various remixes will please many market segments. If that won't do it, the free pictures will." Alan Jones from Music Week gave the song a score of four out of five, concluding that "the UK's premier girl group have another surefire hit with this classy record." James Hamilton from the Record Mirror Dance Update described it as a "huskily melodic soul shuffler" in his weekly dance column. Mark Frith from Smash Hits also gave 'So Good' four out of five, writing, "More a conventional soul track than their previous pop-soul epics, it is still an infectious, beautifully sung tune."

== Music video ==
The music video for "So Good" was directed by American director and editor Tim Royes for EMI London. Jannick Grossman directed photography on the shoot and Rudi Calagari produced the video for A&R Group. It features ambitious choreography on a NY rooftop with the group wearing matching all-white suits and was filmed at Times Square in New York City in July 1994. The video was released on 8 August 1994.

== Track listings ==
- UK CD1
1. "So Good" (Tree Men Full On mix)
2. "So Good" (West End Big Organ mix)
3. "So Good" (West End Dope Jam mix)
4. "So Good" (Joe and Pain remix)
- UK CD2
1. "So Good" (West End remix)
2. "So Good" (West End Dope Jam mix)
3. "Ain't No How I'm Steppin"
4. "Loving You"
- UK 7-inch and cassette single
1. "So Good" (West End remix)
2. "Ain't No How I'm Steppin"
- Australian CD single
1. "So Good" (West End remix)
2. "So Good" (West End Dope Jam mix)
3. "Ain't No How I'm Steppin"
4. "Loving You"
5. "Just a Step from Heaven" (radio mix)

== Credits and personnel ==
Credits are lifted from the Always & Forever album booklet.

Studio

- Recorded at Sarm Studios (London, England)

Personnel

- Eternal – writing
- Nigel Lowis – all instruments, production, mixing
- Ren Swan – mixing, engineering

== Charts ==
=== Weekly charts ===
| Chart (1994) | Peak position |
|---|---|
| Europe (Eurochart Hot 100) | 51 |
| Europe (European Hit Radio) | 37 |
| Israel (Israeli Singles Chart) | 29 |
| Netherlands (Dutch Top 40 Tipparade) | 9 |
| Netherlands (Single Top 100 Tipparade) | 6 |
| New Zealand (Recorded Music NZ) | 49 |
| Scottish Singles Sales (Official Charts) | 23 |
| UK Singles (Official Charts) | 13 |
| UK Airplay (Music Week) | 6 |
| UK Club Chart (Music Week) | 2 |

=== Year-end charts ===
| Chart (1994) | Position |
|---|---|
| UK Singles (OCC) | 125 |
| UK Club Chart (Music Week) | 67 |
