= Gopnik =

Russian term for a juvenile delinquent

A gopnik, (Note: Russian: гопник, romanized: gopnik, pronounced [ˈɡopnʲɪk]; Ukrainian: гопник, romanized: hopnyk; Belarusian: гопнік, romanized: hopnik; Russian plural гопники (gopniki), also гопота (gopota), and гопари (gopari)) (feminine: gopnitsa) is a member of a juvenile delinquent urban subculture in Russia, Ukraine, Belarus, and some other former Soviet republics. In the 21st century the image of "gopnik" is mostly preserved as an imitation of the stereotype, e.g., as an artistic image in Russian pop-culture and some other countries.

The collective noun is gopota (Russian: гопота). Another Russian collective term for hoodlums is shpana (шпана). (Note: e.g., Soviet film Farewell, Zamoskvoretskaya punks.... American film Adulthood was translated as Шпана 2.) The subculture of gopota has its roots in working-class communities in the late Russian Empire and gradually emerged underground during the later half of the 20th century in many cities in the Soviet Union. Even before their heyday in the 1990s following the dissolution of the Soviet Union and the associated rise in poverty, there was a "gopnik" culture in the Soviet Union. Young men from working class areas rebelled against neformaly (non-conformists) and harassed the lovers of Western music, which had become popular in the Soviet Union in the 1980s.

== Etymology ==
Folk etymology connects the word to the GOP, the acronym for городское общество призора Gorodskoye Obshchestvo Prizora (municipal welfare society), an organization to provide shelter for the destitute. An alternative origin is the onomatopoeic гоп (gop), 'jump', 'leap', cf. the slang terms го́пать, 'gopat', or гоп-стоп, 'gop-stop', which mean mugging or robbing.

== Stereotypical appearance and behaviour ==
Gopniks are often seen wearing Adidas tracksuits, which were popularized by the 1980 Moscow Olympics Soviet team. While sunflower seeds (colloquially semki [семки] or semechki [семечки]) are a common snack in Ukraine and Russia, chewing ("cracking") them in public and spitting out the shells on the ground is characteristic of gopniks.

A stereotypical image of a gopnik is one of being conservative, aggressive, homophobic, nationalist and racist, as well as holding strong anti-Western views. Gopniks are also stereotyped as being prone to substance and alcohol abuse, crime and hooliganism.

It is claimed that the originators of the hardbass style of music initially intended it as a parody on the behavior of gopniks.

=== Squatting ===
A stereotype of gopniks is resting squatting (Russian slang terms for the position are "на кортах", na kortakh, a truncation of "на корточках", na kortochkakh, Russian for "squatting") or "doing the crab" ("на крабе", na krabe)). It is described as a learned behavior, attributed to Russian and Soviet prison culture, which avoids sitting on the cold ground. This habit of squatting, known as słowiański przykuc ("Slavic squat") is a new stereotype of Russians in Poland, gaining popularity in 2019, along with being drunk and speaking in mat. The "Slavic squat" or "Slav squat" was also popularized in the West in the early 2010s.

== In popular culture ==
The image of a gopnik had undergone a gradual transformation: from petty hooligans to Adidas tracksuit wearing "real lads" (Russian: "реальные пацаны"), to a stereotypical image in popular music. Eventually the "squatting Slav" has become an international meme. The popularity of the latter peaked in 2017. By the 2020s, gopnik went out of fashion; however its notable presence is still preserved. A number of notable Russian and other post-Soviet pop musicians capitalize on the image of "gopnik". Examples include Estonian rapper Tommy Cash, Russian rapper Husky.

The Russian music and dance subgenre hardbass ironically uses the gopnik style.
