= Hardbass =

Music genre

- Native name: Хардбас(с)
- Other names: Pump, Nasos, Kolbasa
- Stylistic origins: Pumping house; Bouncy techno; Hardstyle
- Cultural origins: Late 1990s, Saint Petersburg, Russia
- Typical instruments: Synthesizer; drum machine; sequencer; sampler; keyboards; digital audio workstation

Subgenres
- Early hardbass; metal shade; sober hardbass/hardbass attacks

Hardbass or hard bass (Russian: хардбас(с), romanized: khardbas(s) (Note: Sometimes, an additional с (s) is not written.), IPA: [xɐrdˈbas]) is a subgenre of pumping house that originated in Saint Petersburg, Russia during the late 1990s, drawing inspiration from bouncy techno, hardstyle, as well as local Russian influences. Hardbass is characterized by its fast tempo (usually 150–175 BPM), distinctive basslines (commonly known as "donks"), distorted sounds, heavy kicks and occasional chants or rapping. In several European countries, so-called "hardbass scenes" have sprung up, which are events related to the genre that involve multiple people dancing in public while masked, sometimes with moshing involved.

== History ==
Hardbass first began to emerge in the late 1990s, mainly in the Saint Petersburg electronic dance music underground, when the pumping house genre, built around the bamboo bass, or donk bass (a type of metallic bass synthesizer sound, first invented by Klubbheads in 1997), became a staple in local raves.

To increase the energy of the parties, Saint Petersburg producers and DJs started to increase the BPM of the pumping house they played and produced, eventually reaching 150 BPM and beyond. Saint Petersburg producers would include distinct whistles and other samples into their production, which would later crystallize into the hardbass sound as it is generally known.

At the same time the characteristic lingo of hardbass formed, such as terms for hardbass music itself, like; kolbasa meaning sausage, a derivative of kolbasitsya, a jargon verb meaning hard partying; pump, or pamp, short for pumping house; nasos, the literal translation of the word pump into Russian.

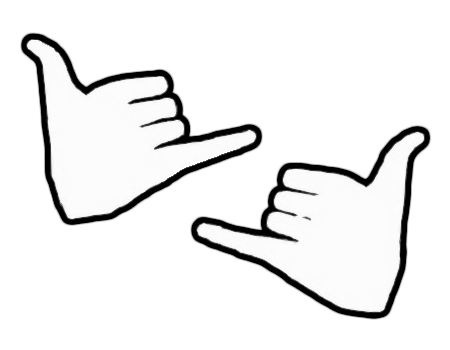
Hardbass koza ("hardbass goat"; in fact, "shaka sign"), hand gesture that became associated with hardbass attacks and hardbass dancing

In 2010, XS Project, a group of four music producers from Saint Petersburg, released a satirical movie on YouTube, together with radio presenters of Gop FM station, accompanying their Bochka, Bass, Kolbasyor (kick drum, bass and kolbasyor) track, which was released in 2003. In the movie, several artists, DJs, and radio presenters, disguised as gopniks, danced in gopnik style on a Saint Petersburg children's playground. The movie was intended to mock the so-called subculture of rave gopniks – young people in tracksuits who would go to rave parties in Russia not to have a good time, but to get intoxicated and cause trouble. The mockery was in the lyrics, which called for a sober and healthy lifestyle, contrary to the way rave gopniks lived. However, street youth in Eastern Europe liked the video and preferred to eschew the irony, and, given the rise of sober right-wing lifestyle in Russia around that time, the dance moves showcased in the movie became basis of a long-lasting series of flash mobs akin to the Harlem Shake meme of the time, when young people in various cities of Eastern Europe would begin to dance, all of a sudden, in gopnik style in the middle of public spaces. The dance moves for hardbass dancing mostly included disorganized feet stomping, jumping and specific hand gestures, with hands clenched in fists with thumb and pinky fingers protruding. This gesture, in fact, "shaka sign", became known as hardbass koza (hardbass goat, meaning hardbass sign of the horns) in Russian. At first, the flash mob spread mainly only in Belarus, Russia, and Ukraine, but eventually dancers from other Eastern European nations, such as Lithuania, the Czech Republic, Poland, Slovakia, Serbia and Croatia joined in.

Some commentators in Slavic countries of the European Union at first considered these flash mobs to be serious manifestation of right-wing propaganda, especially given the lyrics in the song, saying "We bring hardbass to your home, 1 4 8 8", with "1 4 8 8" being a neo-Nazi lingo for "Fourteen words" and Hitler salute. However, experts quickly grasped that the usage was ironic, and that the hardbass crowds consisted mostly of football hooligans and bored teenagers, rather than of actual neo-Nazis. Neo-Nazis around that times also dismissed the connection to hardbass, blaming it on left-wing and anarchist circles instead. However, commentators still identified some right-wing sympatizers in the hardbass attacks, but, according to Miroslav Mares, an expert in far-right extremism from Brno Masaryk University, the influence of hardbass attacks on public opinion was negligible.
