= 5 Sides of a Coin =

- 5 Sides of a Coin
- Directed by: Paul Kell
- Produced by: Paul Kell and Jana Ritter
- Starring: Kool Herc, Afrika Bambaataa, Grandmaster Flash, Grand Wizard Theodore, Gil Scott-Heron
- Cinematography: Paul Kell
- Edited by: Paul Kell
- Music by: Various Artists
- Distributed by: 7th Art Releasing
- Release date: 2003
- Running time: 70 mins
- Country: Canada
- Languages: English, French, Japanese, German, Italian
- Budget: $16,000 CAD

5 Sides of a Coin is a 2003 feature-length documentary by Canadian filmmaker Paul Kell about hip hop culture. The title references the five elements inherent to this culture, viz., emceeing, deejaying, b-boying (aka breakdancing), writing (i.e., graffiti or street art), and beatboxing. Each element is highlighted individually throughout the film's five chapters.

== Synopsis ==
The documentary examines hip hop culture through interviews with hip hop artists such as Kool Herc, Mercedes Ladies, Jurassic 5, and Afrika Bambaataa. The interviews are interspersed with performance footage and archival footage from various periods of time in the history of hip hop.

== Critical reception ==
Critical reception for 5 Sides of a Coin has been mixed. Variety wrote a predominantly favorable review, commenting "Not quite definitive, "Five Sides of a Coin" is nevertheless a thorough overview of hip-hop's origins and influences. Nifty, well-executed docu emphasizes music's creative, bohemian side, skipping more commercial excesses." The New York Times also commented on the movie, praising Kell for the film's attention to music but also writing that "Still, you can't help but feel that something is missing, that hip-hop has been around long enough, and is complex enough, to deserve something more than piety."
