= Oh Baby I... =

1994 single by Eternal

Single by Eternal

from the album Always & Forever
- B-side: "Sweet Funky Thing"; "Decisions"
- Released: 24 October 1994
- Studio: Mad Fly Productions (New York City)
- Genre: Pop-R&B; soul
- Length: 4:32
- Label: EMI; 1st Avenue
- Songwriters: Tommy Faragher; Lotti Golden
- Producers: Tommy Faragher; Lotti Golden

Eternal singles chronology
"So Good" (1994)	"Oh Baby I..." (1994)	"Crazy" (1994)

"Oh Baby I..." is a song by English girl group Eternal, written by Lotti Golden and Tommy Faragher. It was the fifth single released from their debut album, Always & Forever (1993), in October 1994 by EMI and 1st Avenue Records. The song peaked at number four on the UK Singles Chart and was certified silver by the British Phonographic Industry (BPI) for shipments of over 200,000 units. The song also reached the top 10 in the Netherlands and charted at number 11 in both Ireland and New Zealand. The accompanying music video was directed by Tim Royes and filmed in London.

== Critical reception ==
Jon O'Brien from AllMusic viewed the song as an example of "perfect R&B-infused pop". Annette M. Lai from the Gavin Report described it as "touching". In his weekly UK chart commentary, James Masterton wrote, "Now with their fifth single they move away from the dancefloor and into ballad territory". Alan Jones from Music Week gave "Oh Baby I..." a score of four out of five and named it Pick of the Week, declaring it as "a sophisticated and pretty ballad that proves they have the vocal ability to hold their own against Jade and SWV. A nicely restrained production that should have no trouble in maintaining their hot streak, while luring new fans to the Always & Forever album." Jordan Paramor from Smash Hits also gave it four out of five, writing, "'Oh Baby I...' is very much in the Eternal style, laid-back and souly. It's got the harmonies, it's got style and it's got the potential to be a big hit." Another Smash Hits editor, Mark Frith, complimented it as a "lush ballad".

== Music video ==
The music video for "Oh Baby I..." was directed by British director and editor Tim Royes of The A+R Group and filmed on location in London for EMI. Greg Copeland directed photography on the shoot and Lizzie Ross produced the video. It features the group members performing by running water, behind or under a thin veil and sitting on the top of a mountain. In between, bare-chested male models appears.

== Track listings ==
- UK 7-inch and cassette single
1. "Oh Baby I..." (Nigel Lowis remix)
2. "Sweet Funky Thing" (New York City radio mix)
3. "Oh Baby I..." (original mix)
- UK and Australian CD single
1. "Oh Baby I..." (Nigel Lowis remix)
2. "Sweet Funky Thing" (Puff the Blunted Dragon mix)
3. "Sweet Funky Thing" (K & T Atlanta remix)
4. "Decisions"
- European maxi-CD single
1. "Oh Baby I..." (Nigel Lowis remix)
2. "(Something Inside) So Strong"
3. "Sweet Funky Thing" (West End Master mix)
4. "Sweet Funky Thing" (K & T Southern remix)

== Credits and personnel ==
Credits are lifted from the Always & Forever album booklet.

Studios

- Recorded at Mad Fly Productions (New York City)
- Mixed at Platinum Island (New York City)

Personnel

- Tommy Faragher – writing, keyboards, drums, production, mixing, engineering
- Lotti Golden – writing, production, mixing
- Paul Pesco – guitar, sitar
- Bashiri Johnson – percussion
- David Sussman – mix engineering, mixing

== Charts ==
=== Weekly charts ===
Chart (1994–1995)	Peak position
Australia (ARIA)	102
Belgium (Ultratop 50 Flanders)	31
Europe (Eurochart Hot 100)	20
Europe (European Hit Radio)	31
Iceland (Íslenski Listinn Topp 40)	39
Ireland (IRMA)	11
Israel (IBA)	4
Netherlands (Dutch Top 40)	10
Netherlands (Single Top 100)	9
New Zealand (Recorded Music NZ)	11
Scotland Singles (OCC)	9
UK Singles (OCC)	4
UK Airplay (Music Week)	2
UK Hip Hop/R&B (OCC)	1

=== Year-end charts ===
Chart (1994)	Position
UK Singles (OCC)	55

== Certifications ==
Region	Certification	Certified units/sales
United Kingdom (BPI)	Silver	200,000^{^}
^{^} Shipments figures based on certification alone.

== Release history ==
Region	Date	Format(s)	Label(s)	Ref(s).
United Kingdom	24 October 1994	7-inch vinyl; 12-inch vinyl; CD; cassette	EMI; 1st Avenue	
Australia	3 July 1995	CD; cassette	EMI; 1st Avenue	
