= Mercedes Ladies =

Female hip hop group

Mercedes Ladies is the first all-female Hip Hop group with a DJ. The group was founded in the mid-1970s in the Bronx, New York, by Sheri Sher, Ever Def, Zena Z, Tracey Tee, DJ Baby D (D'Bora), and RD Smiley. Their group later expanded to include MC Smiley and DJ La Spank.

== Beginnings ==
The group began as a social crew called The Mercedes Young Ladies, made up of teenaged girls who would go to Hip Hop jams together on Boston Road in the Bronx. They selected the name because of the association of the Mercedes brand with sophistication, and they wore matching yellow sweatshirts with the name in black velvet iron-on lettering. Some of the founding members met at Evander Childs High School, where rapper Sha-Rock also attended: Sheri Sher (Sheri Hines), RD Smiley (Rene Pearson), Little Bit (Deborah Carter) and Tracey Tee (Tracey Peterkin). Together with loving Hip Hop, their shared personal histories as daughters of single mothers bonded them together. The crew had fashion sense and presence, and they began to be shouted out by MCs at the jams.

Inspired by the rapping and DJ-ing at the jams—particularly Grandmaster Flash for DJ Baby D--and encouraged by friends Grand Wizzard Theodore and his DJ crew The L Brothers, the Mercedes Young Ladies moved from social crew to Hip Hop group around 1976, eventually shortening their name to Mercedes Ladies. The group first performed at the schoolyard at 63 Park on Boston Road and 169th, with the L Brothers opening up for them. The Mercedes Ladies eventually grew to 21 girls; many members who were not MCs or DJs helped promote the group and represent the group at jams and events.

== History ==
Between 1976 and 1983, the group performed frequently at Hip Hop shows at parks and venues such as the Ecstasy Garage, the Renaissance Ballroom, the Hotel Diplomat, and T Connection alongside acts such as the Funky 4+1 (with Sha Rock), Lovebug Starski, Kool DJ AJ, Afrika Bambaataa, Spoonie Gee, the Furious Five, Dr. Jeckyll and Mr. Hyde, DJ Clark Kent, DJ Charlie Chase, Kool Herc, Eddie Cheeba, Kurtis Blow, and the Treacherous Three. On April 11, 1980 they played head-to-head with another group of women MCs and DJs, Inner City Disco, at the Ecstasy Garage. In June 1980, Mercedes Ladies played at the Police Athletic League recreation center, a popular local venue for rap jams on 183rd and Webster Avenue, on the same bill as the Cold Crush Brothers, the Fantastic Five, Rayvon and Johnny Wa. Fab Five Freddy, Glenn Friedman, Debbie Harry, and Chris Stein of Blondie attended this show, and Fab 5 Freddy remembers that Mercedes Ladies, "three Black Girls rapping and rocking cowboy hats . . .made an impression on Debbie. She loved their vibe--we all did."

Throughout their time as performers, Mercedes Ladies dealt with the challenges of a male-dominated music scene and industry for equitable treatment, recognition of their skills, decent billing, and proper compensation for performances. The group often received hundreds of dollars less than their male counterparts when it came time to settle up. At one show at a roller skating rink on Long Island, the promoter paid them only seven dollars and twenty-six cents each, a story that Smiley wrote into their rap routines: "We got paid 7 and a quarter and a penny to our names/ trying to put Mercedes in the Hall of Fame." Some male artists even tried to sabotage their sets by unplugging their turntables and mics. But the group persisted, making music together until the mid-1980s.

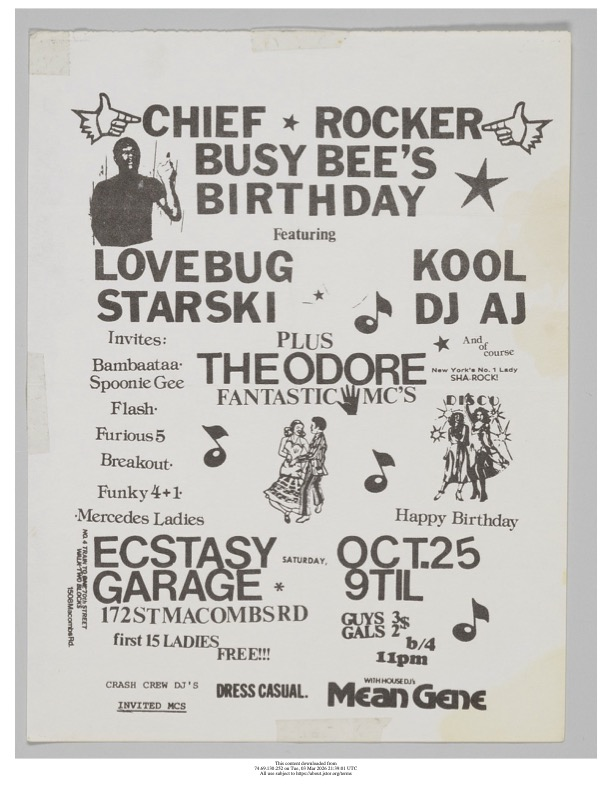
flier for “Chief Rocker Busy Bee's Birthday,” featuring Mercedes Ladies at Ecstasy Garage on October 25, 1980. The flier is in portrait orientation and printed on white paper with black text in varying sizes and fonts, graphics, and a black-and-white photograph.

== Legacy ==
Mercedes Ladies were part of building Hip Hop from its beginnings. Many women rappers came after them, particularly New York City artists such as Roxanne Shanté, Sweet Tee, and Salt-N-Pepa. Hip Hop journalist and rapper Dee Barnes cites them as an inspiration, alongside The Sequence and Sylvia Robinson of Sugar Hill Records. Though the Mercedes Ladies never recorded their own full-length album or 12-inch single, some of their live sets were preserved on tape. The Mercedes Ladies are remembered for their style, live shows, rhymes, and self-presentation. They also contributed background vocals to Donald D's "Don's Groove" (1984), which was produced and arranged by Grandmaster Flash.

After splitting from the group, DJ Baby D toured with Rapper Kurtis Blow for about two years. They were one of the first male MC/female DJ duos. Baby D went on to have a solo music career under the name D'Bora, recording the LP and ESP (Smash Records) and the single "Dream About You."

DJ La Spank (Gail Windley) now goes by DJ Flame. She was also an MC/DJ for Inner City Disco. DJ Flame produces and hosts an urban gospel radio show called The Anointed Mic Check on the Harlem station WHCR 90.3 and has been the DJ for Kurtis Blow's Hip Hop Church at Greater Hood Memorial in Harlem for over 10 years.

In 2008, Sheri Sher published a novel called Mercedes Ladies based on the true story of the group's founding using the diaries she kept from that era. Sher frequently represents the group at academic panels and on podcasts and, in 2024, she was featured at the inaugural "Fresh, Bold & So Def Symposium: A Tribute to Women in Hip Hop" held at Lincoln Center. She is interviewed in the documentary On the Record (2020), an investigation into Def Jam co-founder Russell Simmons regarding allegations by over 20 women of sexual abuse, harassment, and rape.

The Mercedes Ladies were inducted into the Hip Hop Hall of Fame in 2014. In 2019, the New York Department of Cultural Affairs cited Mercedes Ladies' contributions to Hip Hop as integral to the culture and history of their South Bronx neighborhood, Morrisania. The group was featured in the documentaries 5 Sides of a Coin (2003), My Mic Sounds Nice: The Truth About Women in Hip Hop (2010), directed by Ava DuVernay, She Will Be Heard (2017) and The First Ladies of Hip Hop (2023).
