= Save Our Love =

1994 single by Eternal

Single by Eternal

from the album Always & Forever
- B-side: "If You Need Me Tonight"; "Hey Baby"
- Released: 4 January 1994
- Studio: Prime Time (Los Angeles)
- Genre: Pop; new jack swing; house (remix)
- Length: 3:46
- Label: EMI; 1st Avenue
- Songwriters: Scott Cutler; Anne Preven; Eddie Chacon
- Producer: Scott Cutler

Eternal singles chronology
"Stay" (1993)	"Save Our Love" (1994)	"Just a Step from Heaven" (1994)

"Save Our Love" is a song by British R&B girl group Eternal. It was released in January 1994 by EMI and 1st Avenue Records as the second single from the group's debut album, Always & Forever (1993). The song was written by Anne Preven, Eddie Chacon and Scott Cutler, who also produced it. It peaked at number eight on the UK Singles Chart remained in the UK top 75 for seven weeks. The accompanying music video, directed by Swiss director Dieter Trattmann, was filmed in December 1993.

== Critical reception ==
Pan-European magazine Music & Media commented, "They promised to stay with us forever and always, and judged by the quality of this second single, these new jill swingers won't be out of sight and hearing for a long time." Alan Jones from Music Week gave the song a score four out of five and named it Pick of the Week, adding, "Eternal's glossy and soulful sheen is impeccably stamped all over a chiming mid-tempo cut that may not be as addictive as 'Stay', but is nevertheless uplifting and radio friendly. More propulsive and muscular mixes have already powered this to the top of the Club Chart, and pop success is assured." Sam Steele from NME complimented the song as "silky smooth", while People Magazine described it as "intoxicating", noting that Eternal "creates a pre-disco sound that calls to mind the Honey Cone and the Three Degrees."

Tim Jeffery from the Record Mirror Dance Update complimented the club remix by West End, stating that they are "transforming this pop swing thing into a chugging funky semi-house track that will give Eternal an airing on the dancefloor. Commercial of course, and very catchy, especially the constantly repeated chorus". Mark Frith from Smash Hits gave it a top score of five out of five and named it Best New Single, writing, "Now, this is the stuff. 'Save Our Love' begins with chiming bells and goes into a swing beaty groove before giving way to a wonderful anthemic pop chorus that's shouted with gusto. It sounds incredible — and that's just on it first play. A few more listens and you realise it's a truly great, cool and bang up-to-date pop record, the sort you'll remember as one of your favourites of the year next Christmas. That good. Top 3 at least, but it could go to the top."

== Track listings ==
- UK and Australian CD single
1. "Save Our Love" (7-inch mix) – 3:46
2. "If You Need Me Tonight" – 3:59
3. "Save Our Love" (West End mix) – 4:33
4. "Save Our Love" (original mix) – 4:29
- UK 7-inch and cassette single
1. "Save Our Love" (7-inch mix)
2. "If You Need Me Tonight"
3. "Hey Baby"
- UK 12-inch single

A1. "Save Our Love" (Jervier Roadhouse mix)
A2. "Save Our Love" (Simon Law mix)
A3. "Save Our Love" (West End D'Lick mix)
B1. "Save Our Love" (West End D'Rhythm mix)
B2. "Save Our Love" (West End D'Song mix)

== Credits and personnel ==
Credits are lifted from the Always & Forever album booklet.

Studio

- Recorded at Prime Time Studios (Los Angeles)

Personnel

- Scott Cutler – writing, production
- Anne Preven – writing
- Eddie Chacon – writing
- Peter Pritchard – keyboards, programming
- West End – additional production and remix
- Barney – mix engineering

== Charts ==
=== Weekly charts ===
Chart (1994)	Peak position
Australia (ARIA)	70
Europe (Eurochart Hot 100)	29
Europe (European Hit Radio)	15
Germany (GfK)	86
Iceland (Íslenski Listinn Topp 40)	23
Ireland (IRMA)	20
Israel (Israeli Singles Chart)	5
New Zealand (Recorded Music NZ)	34
UK Singles (Official Charts)	8
UK Airplay (Music Week)	2
UK Dance (Music Week)	6
UK Club Chart (Music Week)	1

=== Year-end charts ===
Chart (1994)	Position
UK Singles (OCC)	124

== Certifications ==
Region	Certification	Certified units/sales
New Zealand (RMNZ)	Gold	15,000^{‡}
^{‡} Sales+streaming figures based on certification alone.

== Release history ==
Region	Date	Format(s)	Label(s)	Ref(s).
United Kingdom	4 January 1994	7-inch vinyl; 12-inch vinyl; CD; cassette	EMI; 1st Avenue	
Australia	25 July 1994	CD; cassette	EMI; 1st Avenue	
