= Shiva (British band) =

Band from West Yorkshire

- Origin: United Kingdom
- Label: FFRR
- Past members: Louise Dean; Gino Piscitelli; Paul Ross

Shiva was a British band consisting of Louise Dean, Gino Piscitelli and Paul Ross. Formed in Huddersfield as Shine, the band changed their name to Shiva prior to the release of their debut single "Work It Out" in 1995. That single reached number 36 on the UK singles chart. A subsequent promotional single, "Freedom", was at number one on Record Mirror's "Cool Cuts" chart at the time of Dean's death from a hit and run driver on 18 June 1995. After initially being cancelled, the track was released in tribute to Dean and charted at number 18 in August 1995. After a memorial event for Dean in November 1995 raised £10,000, Piscitelli and Ross released "Let There Be Love" with TJ Davis and toured with her. The band performed at Deva Fest in 2019.

== History ==
Gino Piscitelli, Paul Ross, and Louise Dean formed the band in Huddersfield in West Yorkshire. Dean had previously been a backing singer for Rozalla and Urban Cookie Collective. At the time, the band was called "Shine", but they were forced to change this after a similarly named band threatened to block the release of their first single. They released their debut single as "Shiva", naming themselves after the mythological Lord of the Dance. "Work It Out", which contained mixes from West End, David Morales, Mindwarp, and Fathers of Sound, peaked at number 36 on the UK singles chart.

The band then released a subsequent promotional single, "Freedom", which topped Record Mirror's "Cool Cuts" chart. On 18 June 1995, Dean was killed by a van in a hit and run near her home in Huddersfield while crossing a road; a Moldgreen man was charged with causing death by dangerous driving along with six other related charges, and was remanded in custody. The band were due to appear at a Kiss 102 roadshow that day, and to sign a publishing deal with BMG Rights Management the following day. Originally, their second single, "Freedom", was pulled by its label, FFRR Records; the track was eventually released as a tribute to Dean at the behest of both her mother and the remaining members of the band. Featuring Dean's final recorded performance, and including remixes from BT, K-Klass, and Loveland, the track charted at No. 18 on the UK singles chart in August 1995.

Billboard reported in their 22 July 1995 issue that the band were auditioning replacement singers. On 1 November 1995, a memorial event was held for Dean at Huddersfield Sport Centre. Supported by several clubs including Renaissance, Love to Be, The Haçienda, Up Yer Ronson, and Angels, the event featured DJ performances from Sasha, Tom Wainwright, Graeme Park, Ian Ossia, and Allister Whitehead and live PAs from Shiva, MN8, and Evolution; the event raised £10,000 for Campaign Against Drink Driving and Dean's family. In 1996, TJ Davis joined the band, with whom Pescitelli and Ross performed the Northern Exposure tour including gigs at Tribal Gathering and Phoenix Festival, and released a single, "Let There Be Love", which was remixed by Mark Picchiotti. In 2019, the band reunited specifically for Deva Fest, a Chester dance festival.

== Single discography ==
- "Work It Out" (1995) – UK No. 36
- "Freedom" (1995) – UK No. 18
- "Let There Be Love" (with TJ Davis) – did not chart
