= Real Love (The Time Frequency song) =

Single by The Time Frequency

from the album Dominator
- Released: 1991 (Clubscene Records); 1992 (Jive Records)
- Genre: Dance, techno
- Label: Clubscene Records; Jive Records
- Songwriter(s): Jon Campbell
- Producer(s): Jon Campbell

The Time Frequency singles chronology
"Real Love" (1992)	"New Emotion" (1992)

"Real Love" is the debut single by the Time Frequency, released in 1992. It charted at number 60 on the UK Singles Chart. It can be considered the Time Frequency's signature song, due to it being the most well known song the band has released. The "1, 2, 1, 2" is sampled from the I Start Counting song "Lose Him".

In 1993, a remix of the song was released, titled "Real Love '93". It peaked at number eight on the UK Singles Chart, making it the group's most successful single. Another version of the song was released in 2002 titled "Real Love 2002", and reached No. 43 on the UK Singles Chart and No. 12 on the Scottish Singles Chart. It also peaked at No. 10 on the UK Dance Singles Chart and No. 4 on the UK Independent Singles Chart. Another version titled "Real Love 2006" was included on the compilation album Ultimate Scottish Clubnation.

== Personnel ==
- Mary Kiani – vocals
- Jon Campbell – vocals, production

== Charts ==
=== Original version ===
Chart (1992)	Peak position
UK Singles (OCC)	60

=== Remix ===
Chart (1993)	Peak position
UK Singles (OCC)	8

=== 2002 version ===
Chart (2002)	Peak position
UK Singles (OCC)	43
Scotland (OCC)	12
UK Dance (OCC)	10
UK Indie (OCC)	4
