= D'Bora =

American singer

- Born: D'Bora Lippett
- Occupation: dance artist
- Known for: member of the all-female rap group, Mercedes Ladies; Singer

D'Bora Lippett is an American female dance artist. She was previously a member of the all-female rap group, Mercedes Ladies, from the Bronx. In Mercedes Ladies, Lippett was known as "Baby D".

== Music career ==
In 1984, D'Bora released her first single "No Sense" on New York City based dance label West End Records. It was released with two different mixes. This was the start of a 15+ year career for the singer.

In 1990, D'Bora was the vocalist on Freestyle Orchestra's song, "Keep On Pumping It Up".

D'Bora's single, "Dream About You" was a chart-topper in the UK's clubs. It topped the import charts, and reached #75 in the UK Singles Chart in September 1991. The album version was remixed by Steve "Silk" Hurley as a single. The album was called E.S.P and appeared on Smash Records.

In 1995, on a new record label (MCA Records), D'Bora released her US and UK club hit "Going Round". It hit Top 40 in the UK Single Chart. The follow-up, "Good Love, Real Love", was less successful in the UK Singles Chart (#58). A 1999 single, "Honey", performed worse and failed to reach the UK Top 75.

== Personal life ==
Lippett joined the US Navy in 1992. She had 3 children. She is married to a US marine.
