= Rod Lucas =

Australian rules footballer, born 1905

Personal information
- Full name: Rod Lucas
- Born: 30 November 1905
- Died: 27 August 1975 (aged 69)
- Original team: St Albans
- Height: 178 cm (5 ft 10 in)
- Weight: 74 kg (163 lb)

Playing career^{1}
Years	Club	Games (Goals)
1927, 1929	Geelong	7 (2)
- ^{1} Playing statistics correct to the end of 1929.

Rod Lucas (30 November 1905 – 27 August 1975) was an Australian rules footballer who played with Geelong in the Victorian Football League (VFL).
