= The Time Frequency =

Scottish electronic dance music group

- Top: Classic logo, used from 1994–present Bottom: Modern logo used from 2014–present

Background information
- Origin: Glasgow, Scotland
- Genres: Dance; techno; rave; hardcore techno
- Years active: 1990–present
- Members: Jon Campbell; Paul Inglis; Lorena Dale; Gavin McCloy
- Past members: Mary Kiani; Jo Wilson; Steven Nelson; Colin McNeil; Kyle Ramsay; Debbie Millar
- Website: timefrequency.co.uk

The Time Frequency (TTF) are a Scottish electronic dance music group, founded by Jon Campbell in early 1990.

Members that TTF have included are fellow keyboard players Paul Inglis, Steven Nelson, Kyle Ramsay and later Colin McNeil. Mary Kiani was the lead singer of TTF, followed by Jo Wilson, Debbie Millar and Lorena Dale.

During the 1990s, they had chart success with a number of singles and EPs, amongst which the biggest were The Power Zone EP, Such a Phantasy EP and "Real Love", which, after a remix, reached number 8 on the UK Singles Chart.

== History ==
=== Formation and Dominator (1990–1994) ===
Jon Campbell was the frontman of the synthpop band Thru the Fire from 1987 to 1990. He described Thru the Fire as "trying to be Depeche Mode". He later dissolved the band to form The Time Frequency, while keeping the initials. Their first release was the white label EP, Futurama. In 1992, the band released the single "Real Love" through the record label Jive Records. They released more singles and EPs until 1994, when they released their first album, Dominator, which included many of the singles that had been released prior to 1994, as well as new tracks.

=== Kiani's departure, Debbie Millar joining and Dominator 2 (1994–2012) ===
In 1994, session singer Mary Kiani was replaced with Debbie Millar, a singer from Bournemouth. Millar sang "Dreamscape '94", TTF's two singles with Tom Wilson released in 1998 and 1999 respectively, and most songs on the second album Dominator 2. During this period, an album titled Escape was completed and planned to be released on Virgin Records, although this fell through due to disagreements with the label. It was later slated for a release in 2000, although it did not get released until 2022.

A greatest hits album was released in 2007, titled TTF – The Ultimate Collection. It includes remixes and tracks by other artists that sampled TTF tracks. While it was originally planned to be released in late 2004, its release was delayed to 2007.

In 2008, TTF released their second studio album, a follow-up to Dominator titled Dominator 2; no singles were released from the album. It had been in production for roughly 10 years; it was first announced in 2002 for release in early 2003 under the name Deliverance.

=== Futurelands and other singles (2013–present) ===
The Time Frequency returned to performing gigs in 2013. After 7 years of no new releases, the band released a new single "I Can Feel It" with vocals by Cheryl Barnes in 2015, "Come Alive" / "United" in 2015, and the album Futurelands in 2017.

On 10 September 2016, TTF's former singer Debbie Millar died. In 2018, the Time Frequency released two non-album singles, "Home" and "In Heaven", with the latter featuring posthumous vocals by Millar.

== Discography ==
=== Albums ===
Title	Album details	Peak chart positions	
Title	Album details	SCO	UK
Dominator	Released: June 1994; Label: Internal Affairs (#KGB500); Formats: CD, CS, LP	7	23
The Ultimate Collection	Released: 6 May 2007; Label: Emotive (#EMO3CD); Formats: CD	71	—
Dominator 2	Released: November 2008; Label: Enigma Music (#EME005); Formats: CD	—	—
Futurelands	Released: 2017; Label: Internal Affairs (#HGB024); Formats: CD	68	—
Escape	Released: 25 November 2022; Label: Internal Affairs (#HGB027); Formats: CD	—	—
"—" denotes items that did not chart or were not released in that territory.

=== Singles and EPs ===
Year	Title	Peak chart positions				Album
Year	Title	SCO	UK	UK Dance	UK Indie	Album
1990	Futurama EP	—	—	—	—	Non-album single
1992	"Real Love"	—	60	—	—	Dominator
1992	New Emotion (EP) (Note: This release is actually called EP, but with the Official Charts listing it as New Emotion (EP) after the first track, The other tracks on the EP were "Retribution 93 (The Prodigy Meets TTF)", "Higher Than Heaven (Remix)" and "U41A")	—	36	—	—	Dominator
1993	The Power Zone EP	—	17	—	—	Dominator
1993	"Real Love '93"	—	8	—	—	Dominator
1994	Such a Phantasy EP	2	25	—	—	Dominator
1994	"Dreamscape '94"	2	32	36	—	Non-album singles
1998	"U Got the Passion" (Tom Wilson vs The Time Frequency)	37	92	—	22	Non-album singles
1999	"Give Me Your Lovin (Sweet Sensation)" (TTF vs Tom Wilson)	41	133	—	42	Non-album singles
2000	"New Emotion 2000"	40	117	—	24	Non-album singles
2002	"Real Love 2002"	12	43	10	4	Non-album singles
2015	"I Can Feel It"	46	—	—	—	Futurelands
2016	"Come Alive/United"	78	—	—	—	Futurelands
2017	"Keep Holding On"	50	—	—	—	Futurelands
2018	"Home"	92	—	—	—	Non-album singles
2018	"In Heaven"	80	—	—	—	Non-album singles
"—" denotes items that did not chart or were not released in that territory.

=== Remixes ===
- 1992 Marc Smith – "Breakdown"
- 1992 Da Mian – "Supernature"
- 1993 Q-Tex – "The Power of Love"
- 1993 Soul City Orchestra – "It's Jurassic"
- 1993 Marcha Fresca – "Love Is... An Ocean Wide"
- 1994 N-Trance – "Set You Free"
- 1994 Saidflorence – "Buy Me"
