= Always & Forever (Eternal album) =

Studio album by Eternal
- Released: 29 November 1993
- Recorded: 1992–1993
- Studio: Prime Time (Los Angeles); Sarm West, Roundhouse (London); Mad Fly Productions (New York)
- Genre: R&B; soul; new jack swing; hip-hop soul
- Length: 58:32
- Label: EMI; 1st Avenue
- Producer: BeBe Winans; Dennis Charles; Lotti Golden; Nigel Lowis; Ronnie Wilson; Tim Simenon; Tommy Faragher

Eternal chronology
Always & Forever (1993)	Power of a Woman (1995)

Singles from Always & Forever
- 1. "Stay" Released: 20 September 1993; 2. "Save Our Love" Released: 3 January 1994; 3. "Just a Step from Heaven" Released: 18 April 1994; 4. "So Good" Released: 8 August 1994; 5. "Oh Baby I..." Released: 24 October 1994; 6. "Crazy" Released: 12 December 1994

Professional ratings
Review scores
Source	Rating
AllMusic	4/5 stars
Billboard	(favorable)
Gavin Report	(favorable)
The Observer	(negative)
Smash Hits	4/5 stars

Always & Forever is the debut studio album by British girl group Eternal. It was released through EMI on 29 November 1993 and is the only studio album by Eternal to feature Louise Nurding, who left the group to embark on a solo career prior to the release of their follow-up album, Power of a Woman (1995). The album became a commercial success, spending 63 weeks in the top 40 of the UK Albums Chart, selling over one million copies in the UK alone and yielding six hit singles. As of 1997, the album had sold over four million copies worldwide. In June 2019, Always & Forever was ranked at number 15 on the Official Charts Company's "top 40 biggest girl band studio albums of the last 25 years" list.

The album's title comes from a line in "Oh Baby I...".

== Single releases ==
Always & Forever yielded six top 20 singles, two of which reached top 5: "Stay" and "Oh Baby I...". "Stay" was the first single to be released from the album, peaking at No. 4 in the UK Singles Chart. This was followed by "Save Our Love" and "Just A Step From Heaven", both of which peaked at No. 8. "So Good" was the next single, peaking at No. 13, followed by "Oh Baby I..." which reached No. 4. "Crazy" was the final single released from the album, peaking at No. 15 in the UK Singles Chart.

== Critical reception ==
Larry Flick from Billboard magazine wrote, "Already the darling of its native U.K., this charismatic group is more than just another factory-issued clique of new-jill swingers. On its debut disc, Always & Forever, slated for March release, songs like first single 'Stay', 'Save Our Love', and 'So Good' cover a necessary funk/hip-hop canvas with retro-disco and pop colors—not to mention nicely measured vocals that reveal more range than much of the competition. The songs, written and produced by a virtual army of well-regarded folks from both sides of the ocean, are well-structured and showcase the act's voices to excellent effect."

== Commercial performance ==
Always & Forever was a huge success, peaking at number 2 on the UK Albums Chart, and was later certified 4× Platinum by the BPI for sales of over 1.2 million copies. The album spent over 76 weeks in the charts. After its release at the end of 1993, it slowly climbed the album chart peaking at No. 3 in May 1994 shortly after the release of the third single, "Just a Step from Heaven". The album stayed in the chart throughout 1994 becoming that year's third best-selling album in the UK, before climbing to No. 2 in January 1995. The album broke records for being the first to sell over one million copies in the UK by a female group. As of 2015, it is the only album by a debut act to contain six top 15 hits and the first album by a female group to be nominated for best album at the BRIT Awards. The album had an American release in March 1994, selling 81,000 copies by December 1994.

== Track listing ==
No.	Title	Writer(s)	Producer(s)	Length
1.	"Stay"	Bobby Khouzouri; Mark Steven	Nigel Lowis	3:56
2.	"Crazy"	BeBe Winans	Winans; Tim Simenon (co.)	4:02
3.	"Save Our Love" (West End Mix)	Ann Preven; Eddie Chacon; Scott Cutler	Lowis	4:21
4.	"Oh Baby I..."	Lotti Golden; Tommy Faragher	Golden; Faragher	5:29
5.	"I'll Be There"	Geoffrey Williams; Simon Stirling	Lowis	5:13
6.	"Sweet Funky Thing"	Evelyn "Champagne" King; Golden; Faragher	Golden; Faragher	4:46
7.	"Never Gonna Give You Up"	Maria Christanson; Golden; Faragher	Golden; Faragher	3:58
8.	"Just a Step from Heaven"	Shepard Solomon; Wayne Cohen	Dennis Charles; Ronnie Wilson	4:16
9.	"Let's Stay Together"	Al Green; Willie Mitchell; Al Jackson, Jr.	Charles; Wilson	4:38
10.	"This Love Is for Real"	Golden; Robbie Nevil; Faragher	Lowis	3:44
11.	"So Good"	Easther Bennett; Vernie Bennett; Kéllé Bryan; Louise Nurding	Lowis	3:57
12.	"If You Need Me Tonight"	Charles; E. Bennett; V. Bennett; Bryan; Nurding; Wilson	Charles; Wilson	4:00
13.	"Don't Say Goodbye"	Charles; E. Bennett; V. Bennett; Bryan; Nurding; Wilson	Charles; Wilson	4:14
14.	"Amazing Grace"	John Newton	Charles; Wilson	1:50

== Charts ==
=== Weekly charts ===
Chart (1993–95)	Peak position
Australian Albums (ARIA)	48
Belgian Albums (Ultratop Flanders)	35
Dutch Albums (Album Top 100)	12
European Albums (Top 100)	17
French Albums (SNEP)	43
German Albums (Offizielle Top 100)	85
Irish Albums (IRMA)	48
Japanese Albums (Oricon)	25
New Zealand Albums (RMNZ)	46
Scottish Albums (OCC)	6
UK Albums (OCC)	2
UK R&B Albums (OCC)	1
US Billboard 200	152
US Heatseekers Albums (Billboard)	5
US Top R&B/Hip-Hop Albums (Billboard)	59

=== Year-end charts ===
Chart (1994)	Position
UK Albums (OCC)	4
Chart (1995)	Position
Dutch Albums (Album Top 100)	61
UK Albums (OCC)	52

== Certifications ==
Region	Certification	Certified units/sales
Australia (ARIA)	Gold	35,000
Germany	—	35,000
Ireland (IRMA)	Gold	7,500^{^}
Japan (RIAJ)	Gold	100,000
Netherlands (NVPI)	Gold	50,000^{^}
United Kingdom (BPI)	4× Platinum	1,400,000
United States	—	81,000
Summaries
Worldwide	—	4,000,000
^{^} Shipments figures based on certification alone.
