= When I Call Your Name (Mary Kiani song) =

Single by Mary Kiani

from the album Long Hard Funky Dreams
- Released: July 1, 1995
- Genre: Eurodance
- Label: 1st Avenue; Mercury
- Songwriters: Lord 'n Elliot; Zee
- Producer: Nightcrawlers

Mary Kiani singles chronology
"When I Call Your Name"	"I Give It All to You" / "I Imagine"

"When I Call Your Name" is the debut solo single by Scottish singer Mary Kiani. It was produced by Nightcrawlers, and released in July 1995 by 1st Avenue and Mercury Records from Kiani's first album, Long Hard Funky Dreams (1995). The song peaked at number 18 on the UK Singles Chart and number one on the UK Dance Singles Chart.

== Track listings and formats ==
#	Title	Length
UK CD single MERCD440
1.	Radio Edit	3:40
2.	Motiv8 Special Club Mix	6:30
3.	A Team Paradise Mix	6:00
4.	Nightcrawlers Vocal Mix	4:21
5.	Hardfloor Vocal Mix	8:00
6.	Eddy Fingers Mix	8:09
UK 12" MERX440
A1.	Motiv8 Special Club Mix	
A2.	Motiv8 Vocal Club Mix	
B1.	Hardfloor Vocal Mix	
B2.	A Team Paradise Mix	

== Charts ==
Chart (1995)	Peak position
Europe (Eurochart Hot 100)	41
Europe (European Dance Radio)	20
Israel (Israeli Singles Chart)	18
Scotland (OCC)	3
UK Singles (OCC)	18
UK Dance (OCC)	1
UK Airplay (Music Week)	21
UK Pop Tip Club Chart (Music Week)	9
