= Stay (Glenn Jones song) =

1990 single by Glenn Jones

Single by Glenn Jones

from the album All for You
- B-side: "It's All in the Game"
- Released: 1990
- Length: 4:15
- Label: Jive
- Songwriters: Mark Stevens; Bobby Khozouri
- Producers: Bobby Khozouri; Mark Stevens

Glenn Jones singles chronology
| "Living in the Limelight" (1988) | "Stay" (1990) | "Can We Try Again" (1990) |

Audio
- "Stay" on YouTube

"Stay" is a song written by Bob Khozouri and Mark Stevens, originally recorded by American singer Glenn Jones. It was released in 1990, by Jive Records, from his fifth album, All for You (1990), reaching number six on the US Billboard Hot Black Singles chart. The song became a worldwide hit for British girl group Eternal in 1993 and 1994.

== Track listings ==
- US 12-inch single

A1. "Stay" (extended version) – 6:47
A2. "Stay" (Tuta's 7-inch edit) – 3:59
A3. "Stay" (instrumental) – 5:10
B1. "Stay" (Brixton Bass mix) – 5:27
B2. "Stay" (7-inch edit) – 3:51
B3. "It's All in the Game" – 4:30

- US cassette single

A. "Stay" (Tuta's 7-inch edit)
B. "It's All in the Game"

- UK 7-inch single

A. "Stay" (Brixton Bass mix) – 3:40
B. "We've Only Just Begun (The Romance Is Not Over)" – 4:42

- UK 12-inch single

A1. "Stay" (Brixton Bass mix) – 5:28
B1. "We've Only Just Begun (The Romance Is Not Over)" – 4:42
B2. "Oh Girl" – 4:35

== Charts ==
| Chart (1990) | Peak position |
|---|---|
| US Hot Black Singles (Billboard) | 6 |

== Eternal version ==
"Stay"

Single by Eternal

from the album Always & Forever
- B-side: "Don't Say Goodbye"
- Released: September 20, 1993
- Studio: Sarm (London, England)
- Genre: Pop hip hop; new jack swing
- Length: 3:50
- Label: EMI; 1st Avenue
- Songwriters: Mark Stevens; Bobby Khozouri
- Producer: Nigel Lowis

Eternal singles chronology
| "Stay" (1993) | "Save Our Love" (1994) |

Alternative cover
- Japanese mini-CD cover

Audio
- "Stay" on YouTube

Three years after Jones' recording was released, "Stay" served as the debut single of British girl group Eternal. It was produced by Nigel Lowis and released on September 20, 1993, by EMI and 1st Avenue Records as the lead single from their first album, Always & Forever (1993). The single entered the UK Singles Chart at number 16 on September 26, 1993, eventually peaking at number four on October 17, 1993. The single was also a hit on the US Billboard Hot 100, peaking at number 19 on March 12, 1994, and selling over 220,000 copies in the US. Its music video was directed by Marcus Nispel.

=== Critical reception ===
Jon O'Brien from AllMusic praised the song as an example of "perfect R&B-infused pop". Upon the release, Larry Flick from Billboard magazine described it as a "shuffling, hip-hop-flavored pop ditty". He added that "sweet lead vocals and pillowy backing harmonies have enough of a soulful edge to hold up against heavy hitting US counterparts SWV and Xscape. Tune is a simple love song, laced with a memorable melody and a fun, sing-along chorus. Expect multiformat acceptance within moments." Bill Speed and John Martinucci from the Gavin Report called the groove "sexy", "confident" and "a jam!". Pan-European magazine Music & Media declared the group as the British answer to En Vogue, adding that "this uptempo tune certainly has the necessary staying power."

Marc Stingl, music director of Radio Gong/Nuremberg received fabulous feedback from his listeners after he made it powerplay. He said, "Our so-called 'hit hammer' is played 36 times a week. According to our rules we never tell what it is, because we want enthusiasts to phone in. Well, it's an absolutely sensational song, a sure-to-be European hit, so our phones were red hot." Alan Jones from Music Week deemed it a "powerful" remake, adding that the girls "have excellent voices". John Kilgo from The Network Forty noted that a "contagious groove, spiced with vintage harmonies, makes this masterpiece incredibly hip". Steven Wells from NME stated that it "pack a surprising bite", calling it "dead classy". People Magazine described the song as "lighter-than-air". Tom Doyle from Smash Hits gave "Stay" a score of four out of five, declaring it as "a fine soul thing with cooing harmonies, pumping beat and voluptuous lyrics, with the singer imploring her boyfriend not to dump her but return to her boudoir instead. Pretty damn catchy it is too. A surefire Top 10 hit."

=== Music video ===
The accompanying music video for "Stay" was filmed in New York City, directed by German director Marcus Nispel, and features the girls executing choreographed dance moves against colorful backdrops. The video became a staple on the American cable network BET's Video Soul in early 1994.

=== Track listings ===
- UK 7-inch and cassette single; US cassette single
1. "Stay" – 3:50
2. "Don't Say Goodbye" – 4:16
- UK 12-inch single

A1. "Stay" (12-inch mix) – 4:51
A2. "Stay" (The Fly mix) – 4:10
B1. "Stay" (West End D'Rhythm mix) – 7:26
B2. "Stay" (West End Clapapella mix) – 4:27

- UK and Australian CD single
1. "Stay" (7-inch mix) – 3:50
2. "Stay" (12-inch mix) – 4:51
3. "Stay" (original mix) – 5:00
4. "Don't Say Goodbye" – 4:16
- US and Canadian CD single
1. "Stay" – 3:50
2. "Stay" (extended mix radio edit) – 3:43
3. "Stay" (extended mix) – 4:53
4. "Stay" (club mix) – 4:36
5. "Stay" (Eternal mix) – 4:36
- US 12-inch single

A1. "Stay" (extended mix) – 4:53
A2. "Stay" (extended instrumental) – 6:42
A3. "Stay" (album version) – 3:50
B1. "Stay" (club mix) – 4:36
B2. "Stay" (Eternal mix) – 4:36
B3. "Stay" (Percapella mix) – 4:51

- Japanese mini-CD single
1. "Stay" (7-inch version)
2. "Stay" (extended version radio edit)
- Dutch CD single (1995)
1. "Stay" (7-inch mix) – 4:00
2. "Stay" (Teddy Riley Eternal mix) – 6:20
3. "Stay" (Teddy Riley remix) – 6:44
4. "Stay" (West End Clapapella mix) – 4:26
5. "Stay" (West End D'Moodier mix) – 8:23

=== Credits and personnel ===
Credits are lifted from the Always & Forever album booklet.

Studio

- Recorded at Sarm Studios (London, England)

Personnel

- Mark Stevens – writing
- Bobby Khozouri – writing
- Nigel Lowis – all instruments, production
- Steve Jervier – additional production and remix
- Peter Craigie – mix engineering
- Ren Swan – engineering

=== Charts and sales ===
==== Weekly charts ====
| Chart (1993–1994) | Peak position |
|---|---|
| Australia (ARIA) | 3 |
| Canada Retail Singles (The Record) | 3 |
| Canada Top Singles (RPM) | 17 |
| Canada Dance/Urban (RPM) | 3 |
| Europe (Eurochart Hot 100) | 18 |
| Europe (European Dance Radio) | 5 |
| Europe (European Hit Radio) | 20 |
| France (SNEP) | 17 |
| Germany (GfK) | 79 |
| Ireland (IRMA) | 19 |
| Israel (Israeli Singles Chart) | 22 |
| Netherlands (Dutch Top 40 Tipparade) | 11 |
| Netherlands (Single Top 100) | 30 |
| New Zealand (Recorded Music NZ) | 11 |
| UK Singles (Official Charts) | 4 |
| UK Airplay (Music Week) | 2 |
| UK Dance (Music Week) | 4 |
| UK Club Chart (Music Week) | 1 |
| US Billboard Hot 100 | 19 |
| US Dance Club Play (Billboard) | 12 |
| US Hot R&B Singles (Billboard) | 13 |
| US Maxi-Singles Sales (Billboard) | 33 |
| US Top 40/Mainstream (Billboard) | 11 |
| US Top 40/Rhythm-Crossover (Billboard) | 9 |
| US Cash Box Top 100 | 17 |

==== Year-end charts ====
| Chart (1993) | Position |
|---|---|
| UK Singles (OCC) | 67 |
| UK Airplay (Music Week) | 38 |
| UK Club Chart (Music Week) | 27 |

| Chart (1994) | Position |
|---|---|
| Australia (ARIA) | 37 |
| Canada Dance/Urban (RPM) | 45 |
| US Billboard Hot 100 | 80 |
| US Hot R&B Singles (Billboard) | 59 |

=== Certifications and sales ===
| Region | Certification | Certified units/sales |
|---|---|---|
| Australia (ARIA) | Gold | 35,000^{^} |
| United States | — | 220,000 |
^{^} Shipments figures based on certification alone.

=== Release history ===
| Region | Date | Format(s) | Label(s) | Ref. |
|---|---|---|---|---|
| United Kingdom | September 20, 1993 | 7-inch vinyl; 12-inch vinyl; CD; cassette | EMI; 1st Avenue | |
| Australia | December 6, 1993 | CD; cassette | EMI; 1st Avenue | |
| United States | January 1994 | 12-inch vinyl; CD; cassette | EMI USA; 1st Avenue | |
| Japan | March 30, 1994 | Mini-CD | EMI | |
