= Mary Kiani =

Scottish singer (born 1965)

- Also known as: Märy Kiani
- Born: 27 March 1965 (age 61); Drumchapel, Scotland
- Genres: Dance
- Occupation: Singer
- Years active: 1990–present
- Label: Mercury

Mary Kiani, usually spelled Märy Kiani on her records, is a Scottish singer who first had hit songs as vocalist for dance music act The Time Frequency (TTF) in the early 1990s and later a solo career. Before TTF, Kiani was a session musician and has toured with Donny Osmond and performed vocals on The Simpsons' Yellow Album. Kiani was born in Glasgow to Pakistani parents originally from Rawalpindi.

== The Time Frequency ==
"Real Love", featuring Kiani, the group's only top 10 hit on the UK Singles Chart, peaked at No. 8 in November 1993. Other charting singles with Kiani were "New Emotion" No. 36, and "The Ultimate High" / "Power Zone" No. 17. Hit singles for the group without Kiani were "Such a Phantasy" No. 25 and "Dreamscape '94" No. 32.

== Solo career ==
After leaving the Time Frequency, Kiani signed a solo recording contract with Mercury Records. She topped numerous club charts and her early singles all made the UK chart. "When I Call Your Name" made No. 18, the double A-side release "I Give It All To You" / "I Imagine" peaked at No. 35, and was followed into the charts by the cover of "Let the Music Play" which reached No. 19. Her fourth release "100%", her last single to be remixed by Motiv8 was another hit at No. 23, and "With or Without You" (a U2 cover) peaked at No. 46. All the singles were taken off her album Long Hard Funky Dreams, which was commercially less successful.

== Discography ==
=== Albums ===
Title	Album details
Long Hard Funky Dreams	Released: 27 January 1997; Label: Mercury (#534 512-2); Formats: CD, CS
The Sydney Sessions	Released: 5 December 2006; Label: JRB Music (#93780.1); Formats: CD
Little Things Mean a Lot	Released: 20 July 2012; Label: Fanfare (#FANFARE067); Formats: CD

=== Singles ===
Year	Title	Peak chart positions			Album
Year	Title	SCO	UK	UK Dance	Album
1995	"When I Call Your Name"	3	18	1	Long Hard Funky Dreams
1995	"I Give It All to You"/"I Imagine"	20	35	12	Long Hard Funky Dreams
1996	"Let the Music Play"	9	19	6	Long Hard Funky Dreams
1997	"100%"	12	23	3	Long Hard Funky Dreams
1997	"With or Without You"	21	46	9	Long Hard Funky Dreams
1999	"Wrap You Up"	—	—	—	The Sydney Sessions
2008	"Anything is Possible"	—	—	—	The Sydney Sessions
2015	"Family"	—	—	—	Non-album single
"—" denotes items that did not chart or were not released in that territory.

=== Singles with The Time Frequency ===
Year	Title	Peak chart positions				Album
Year	Title	SCO	UK	UK Dance	UK Indie	Album
1992	"Real Love"	—	60	—	—	Dominator
1992	New Emotion (EP) (Note: This release is actually called EP with the Official Charts listing it as New Emotion (EP) after the first track, The other tracks on the EP were "Retribution 93 (The Prodigy Meets TTF)", "Higher Than Heaven (Remix)" and "U41A")	—	36	—	—	Dominator
1993	The Power Zone EP	—	17	—	—	Dominator
1993	"Real Love '93"	—	8	—	—	Dominator
2002	"Real Love 2002"	12	43	10	4	Futurelands
"—" denotes items that did not chart or were not released in that territory.
