= The Essential Rick Price =

Compilation album by Rick Price
- Released: 5 November 2010
- Recorded: 1992–1999
- Genre: Rock, pop, Soft rock
- Label: Sony BMG Australia

Rick Price chronology
Revisited (2008)	The Essential Rick Price (2010)	The Water's Edge (2011)

The Essential Rick Price is a greatest hits album by Australian APRA award winning singer songwriter Rick Price. The album was released in November 2010. Price achieved media attention in Australia with "Heaven Knows" in 1992. The album was a big hit in Asia and Europe.

== Track listing ==
No.	Title	Writer(s)	Album	Length
1.	"Not a Day Goes By"	Pam Reswick; Rick Price; Steve Werfel	Heaven Knows	4:17
2.	"Walk Away Renée"	Michael Brown; Bob Calilli; Tony Sansone	Heaven Knows	4:24
3.	"Heaven Knows"	Harold Fields; Price	Heaven Knows	4:26
4.	"Where Is the Love" (with Margaret Urlich)	Ralph MacDonald; William Salter	Songs from the Heart	2:54
5.	"River Of Love"	Fields; Price	Tamborine Mountain	4:42
6.	"A House Divided"	Reswick; Price; Werdel	Heaven Knows	4:22
7.	"What's Wrong With That Girl"	Mark Buckle; Price	Heaven Knows	4:09
8.	"Where in the World"	Phil Buckle; Price	Another Place	3:58
9.	"Trust Me This is Love" (with Tina Arena)	Price	Tamborine Mountain	3:58
10.	"Bridge Building Man"	Price	Tamborine Mountain	4:57
11.	"Fragile"	Field; Price	Heaven Knows	3:27
12.	"Listen to Your Heart"	Field; Price	"Not a Day Goes By" B-side	3:43
13.	"Love Never Dies"	Price	Tambourine Mountain	5:47
14.	"To Be With You"	Price	Tambourine Mountain	4:14
15.	"You're Never Alone"	Price	Tambourine Mountain	4:51
16.	"Good As Gone"	Price	Tambourine Mountain	4:51
17.	"For the First Time" (with Tommy Emmanuel)	James Newton Howard; Jud J. Friedman; Allan Dennis Rich	Collaboration (Tommy Emmanuel album)	5:05
18.	"Tenterfield Saddler"	Peter Allen	Straight from the Heart	4:07

== Release history ==
Region	Date	Format	Label	Catalogue
Australia	5 November 2010	CD, Music download	Sony BMG Australia	886977 6431 2
