= Live (Margaret Urlich album) =

Live album by Margaret Urlich
- Released: 1994
- Recorded: 1992/1993
- Genre: Pop
- Label: Sony

Margaret Urlich chronology
| Chameleon Dreams (1992) | Live (1994) | The Deepest Blue (1995) |

Singles from Live
- 1. "Where Is The Love (with Rick Price)" Released: 1993 AUS #31

Live is the third solo album by Margaret Urlich, released in 1994. Live was recorded on Urlich's sold out 1992/1993 tour in support of her Chameleon Dreams album. One studio recording, the 1994 ARIA Award-nominated "Where Is the Love" (a duet with Rick Price), is included as the final track on the album.

== Track listing ==
1. "Escaping"
2. "Number One (Remember When We Danced All Night)"
3. "Chameleon Dreams"
4. "Only My Heart Calling"
5. "Guilty People"
6. "Burnt Sienna"
7. "Boy in the Moon"
8. "(I Don't Want to be) Second Best"
9. "The Tide Keeps Rolling In"
10. "Give Me Some Credit"
11. "Human Race"
12. "Where Is the Love" (with Rick Price)
