= The Essential =

The Essential may refer to:

- The Essential Series, an Irish radio show
- The Essential (Concrete Blonde album), 2005
- The Essential (Divinyls album), 2008
- The Essential (Don Johnson album), 1997
- The Essential (Era album), 2010
- The Essential (Ganggajang album), 1996
- The Essential (Grandmaster Flash and the Furious Five album), 2010
- The Essential (John Farnham album), 2009
- The Essential (Nik Kershaw album), 2000
- The Essential, a collection of compilation albums published by EMI Records. Examples include:
  - The Essential (Sandra album), a re-release of 18 Greatest Hits
  - The Essential Diesel, a 2009 best of album by Diesel
- The Essential, a collection of compilation albums published by Sony's Legacy Recordings label. Examples include:
  - The Essential 1927, 2013
  - The Essential Aerosmith, a 2011 reissue of O, Yeah! Ultimate Aerosmith Hits
  - The Essential Alabama, a 2005 reissue of For the Record
  - The Essential Alan Jackson, a 2012 reissue of 34 Number Ones
  - The Essential Alan Parsons Project, 2007
  - The Essential Alice in Chains, 2006
  - The Essential Alison Moyet, 2001
  - The Essential Allman Brothers Band: The Epic Years, 2004
  - The Essential Andy Williams, 2002
  - The Essential Babyface, 2003
  - The Essential Backstreet Boys, 2013
  - The Essential Bangles, 2004
  - The Essential Barbra Streisand, 2002
  - The Essential Barry Manilow, 2005
  - The Essential Bob Dylan, 2000
  - The Essential Boom Crash Opera, 2007
  - The Essential Billy Joel, 2001
  - The Essential Bill Withers, 2013
  - The Essential Blind WIllie Johnson, a 2013 reissue of The Complete Blind Willie Johnson
  - The Essential Blue Öyster Cult, 2003
  - The Essential Boz Scaggs, 2013
  - The Essential Britney Spears, 2013
  - The Essential Bruce Springsteen, 2003
  - The Essential Byrds, 2003
  - The Essential Cheap Trick, 2004
  - The Essential Chet Atkins: The Columbia Years, 2004
  - The Essential Chieftains, 2006
  - The Essential Celine Dion, a 2011 reissue of My Love: Essential Collection
  - The Essential Clash, 2003
  - The Essential Cyndi Lauper, 2003
  - The Essential David Allan Coe, 2004
  - The Essential David Campbell, 2015
  - The Essential Dixie Chicks, 2010
  - The Essential Dolly Parton, 2005
  - The Essential Donovan, 2004
  - The Essential Dr. Hook & the Medicine Show, 2003
  - The Essential Earth, Wind & Fire, 2002
  - The Essential Eddie Money, 2003
  - The Essential Electric Light Orchestra, 2003
  - The Essential Eric Carmen, 2014
  - The Essential Elvis Presley, 2007
  - The Essential Fleetwood Mac, 2007
  - The Essential Foo Fighters, 2022
  - The Essential George Benson, 2006
  - The Essential George Duke, 2004
  - The Essential Gloria Estefan, 2006
  - The Essential Guess Who, a 2010 reissue of Anthology
  - The Essential Harry Belafonte, 2005
  - The Essential Heart, 2002
  - The Essential Herbie Hancock, 2006
  - The Essential Iron Maiden, 2005
  - The Essential James Taylor, 2013
  - The Essential Janis Joplin, 2003
  - The Essential Jars of Clay, 2007
  - The Essential Jefferson Airplane, 2005
  - The Essential John Denver, 2007
  - The Essential John Farnham, 2009
  - The Essential Johnny Cash, 2002
  - The Essential Johnny Mathis, 2004
  - The Essential Johnny Winter, 2013
  - The Essential Journey, 2001
  - The Essential Judas Priest, 2006
  - The Essential Kenny G, 2006
  - The Essential Kenny Loggins, 2002
  - The Essential Kinks, 2014
  - The Essential Kris Kristofferson, 2004
  - The Essential Leonard Cohen, 2002
  - The Essential Lou Reed, 2011
  - The Essential Luther Vandross, 2002
  - The Essential Mariah Carey, a 2011 reissue of Greatest Hits
  - The Essential Mary Chapin Carpenter, 2003
  - The Essential Meat Loaf, a 2011 reissue of The Very Best of Meat Loaf
  - The Essential Men at Work, 2003
  - The Essential Michael Bolton, 2005
  - The Essential Michael Jackson, 2005
  - The Essential Miles Davis, 2001
  - The Essential Neil Diamond, 2001
  - The Essential *NSYNC, 2014
  - The Essential Ozzy Osbourne, 2003
  - The Essential Paul Revere and The Raiders, 2011
  - The Essential Paul Simon, 2007
  - The Essential Poco, 2005
  - The Essential REO Speedwagon, 2004
  - The Essential Rick Price, 2010
  - The Essential Roy Orbison, 2006
  - The Essential Run-D.M.C., 2012
  - The Essential Santana, 2002
  - The Essential Sarah McLachlan, 2013
  - The Essential Shawn Mullins, 2003
  - The Essential Simon & Garfunkel, 2003
  - The Essential Sly & the Family Stone, 2002
  - The Essential Taj Mahal, 2005
  - The Essential Tony Bennett, 2002
  - The Essential Toni Braxton, 2007
  - The Essential Toto, 2003
  - The Essential Van Morrison, 2015
  - The Essential Whitney Houston, a 2011 reissue of Whitney: The Greatest Hits
  - The Essential Willie Nelson, 2003
  - The Essential "Weird Al" Yankovic, 2009
  - The Essential Wu-Tang Clan, 2013
  - The Essential Yanni, 2010
- The Essential Pansy Division, a 2006 compilation album modeled after but not part of the Legacy series

== See also ==
- The Essentials (disambiguation)
- Essential (disambiguation)
