= Mount Tamborine =

Mount Tamborine may refer to:

- Mount Tamborine, Queensland, town on Tamborine Mountain, Australia
- Tamborine Mountain, mountain in Queensland, Australia
- Tamborine Mountain (album), a 1995 album by Rick Price
