= Chameleon Dreams =

Studio album by Margaret Urlich
- Released: 25 September 1992
- Recorded: 1991–1992
- Studio: 301, Sydney; London; Los Angeles
- Genre: Pop, soul
- Length: 49:42
- Label: Sony
- Producer: Robin Smith; Rob Fisher; Ian Prince; Tony Swain

Margaret Urlich chronology
Safety in Numbers (1989)	Chameleon Dreams (1992)	Live (1994)

Singles from Chameleon Dreams
- 1. "Boy in the Moon" Released: August 1992; 2. "Human Race" Released: November 1992; 3. "(I Don't Want to be) Second Best" Released: April 1993; 4. "Burnt Sienna" Released: July 1993

Chameleon Dreams is the second solo album by New Zealand-born singer-songwriter Margaret Urlich, which was released in September 1992. The first single from the album, "Boy in the Moon" (August), reached the top ten on the New Zealand singles chart. The album peaked at No. five in Australia and No 18 in New Zealand and achieved platinum status in both countries. Three other singles were issued from the album, "Human Race" (November 1992), "(I Don't Want to be) Second Best" (April 1993) and "Burnt Sienna" (July).

== Background ==
New Zealand-born singer-songwriter Margaret Urlich had relocated to Sydney in 1988. In the following year she issued her debut solo album, Safety in Numbers via CBS Records, which peaked in the top five on both New Zealand and Australian album charts. Safety in Numbers had been recorded with United Kingdom songwriter-producer Robin Smith at Studios 301, Sydney. The Canberra Times' correspondent described the album in September 1990 as "a mix of ballads and dance tracks with a sound that entwines soul with a pop sense of melody."

== Recording ==
In March 1991, Urlich, armed with a half million dollar recording budget, commenced pre-production for her second album, Chameleon Dreams, with Smith. By mid year, Urlich and Smith had entered Sydney's 301 Studios to record two songs they had co-written "Cover to Cover" and "Burnt Sienna", plus a third track written by Smith with Barry Blue. That same team had been responsible for two tracks on Safety in Numbers ("Escaping" and "Guilty People"). Smith and Blue's latest offering "Boy in the Moon", was issued as the lead single ahead of the album.

Other tracks for the album were collected while Ulrich travelled internationally. First Urlich went to London to co-write with songwriter Rob Fisher with whom she wrote the album's title track "Chameleon Dreams". She then went on to Los Angeles, where she met up with writer-producer Ian Prince, with whom she wrote two songs for the album, "Human Race" and "Never Be the Same"; Prince also produced four tracks. She returned to London, where she co-wrote a tracks with Simon Law and Tony Swain before completing the project with three tracks produced by Swain. Urlich described how the album evolved, "I wrote [it] in three batches — some in London, some in Sydney and some in LA over 14 months. I also decided to use more than one producer as I didn't have any one person in mind with whom I wanted to do the whole record."

== Release ==
The first single, "Boy in the Moon", was released in New Zealand on 18 September 1992 and peaked at No. 9 on the New Zealand Singles Charts, charting for eight weeks. The music video for "Boy in the Moon" was recorded in Paris, with Frédérique Veysset directing. The album was released on 2 October 1992, peaking at No. 18 on the New Zealand Album Charts, staying on the chart for seven weeks. In New Zealand, the album had one more charting single, "(I Don't Want to be) Second Best", which was released 7 March 1993 and peaked at No. 39 with a three-week stay.

Chameleon Dreams was released on 25 September 1992 in Australia via Columbia Records. It provided four singles, "Boy in the Moon" (July) which reached No. 21 on the Australian Singles Charts, "Human Race" (November) which peaked at No. 55, "(I Don't Want to be) Second Best" (April 1993) and "Burnt Sienna" (July), which got to No. 33. Urlich supported the album with a headlining tour from mid-1992 into 1993. Her performance on 10 December 1992 in Sydney was recorded for a live bonus disc of six tracks. The artist won Best Selling New Zealand Artist of the Year for Chameleon Dreams at the 1992 World Music Awards, held in Monte Carlo. At the ceremony she performed "Love Train". For the ARIA Music Awards of 1993 the singer was nominated for Best Female Artist for the album; while Adrian Bolland was nominated for Engineer of the Year for his work on the tracks "Boy in the Moon" and "Cover to Cover" as well as for Teen Queens' "Can't Help Myself" and "Love How You Love Me". In both Australia and New Zealand the album was accredited platinum record, which in New Zealand is over 15,000 units sold and in Australia, in excess of 75,000 units shipped.

== Critical reception ==
Bevan Hannan writing for The Canberra Times rated Chameleon Dreams at 7.5 out-of 10 and explained, "has definite contrasts, a result of tapping into a bevy of writers and using three producers to stir her angelic melodies... overall an easy listening, mature sound layered with soft touch instrumentals. Good, but Urlich is still a few steps away from her reaching her best." CD reviewer for Victor Harbor Times approved of its two opening tracks, "Human Race" and "Love Train", as "strong" and "full of energy and are bound to get people on the dance floor". Furthermore, despite five songwriters, three producers and recording studios it is "a focussed musical work" by "a truly international artist capable of recording music for a world market."

== Track listing ==
Track listing and song credits adapted from Spotify.

No.	Title	Writer(s)	Length
1.	"Human Race"	Ian Prince; Margaret Urlich	4:28
2.	"Love Train"	Urlich; Simon Law	4:21
3.	"Boy in the Moon"	Barry Ian Blue; Robin Albert Smith	6:37
4.	"(I Don't Want to Be) Second Best"	Urlich; Tony Swain	4:50
5.	"Chameleon Dreams"	Dianne Swann; Urlich; Rob Fisher	5:01
6.	"It Ain't Easy"	Urlich; Swain	4:39
7.	"Man Overboard"	Andrew Caine; Blue; Smith	4:59
8.	"Cover to Cover"	Urlich; Smith	4:18
9.	"Never Be the Same"	Prince; Urlich	4:43
10.	"Burnt Sienna"	Urlich; Smith	5:46
Total length:			49:42

=== Track listing for bonus disc version ===
Disc one
No.	Title	Writer(s)	Length
1.	"Human Race"	Ian Prince; Urlich	4:28
2.	"Love Train"	Urlich; Simon Law	4:21
3.	"Boy in the Moon"	Blue; Smith	6:37
4.	"(I Don't Want to Be) Second Best"	Urlich; Swain	4:50
5.	"Chameleon Dreams"	Swann; Urlich; Fisher	5:01
6.	"It Ain't Easy"	Urlich; Swain	4:39
7.	"Man Overboard"	Caine; Blue; Smith	4:59
8.	"Cover to Cover"	Urlich; Smith	4:18
9.	"Never Be the Same"	Prince; Urlich	4:43
10.	"Burnt Sienna"	Urlich; Smith	5:46

Bonus live disc
No.	Title	Writer(s)	Length
1.	"Number One (Remember When We Danced All Night)"	David Tyson; Dean McTaggart
2.	"Boy in the Moon"	Blue; Smith
3.	"Second Best"	Urlich; Swain
4.	"Only My Heart Calling"	Smith
5.	"Escaping"	Blue; Smith
6.	"Burnt Sienna"	Urlich; Smith

== Personnel ==
Credits adapted from the liner notes of Chameleon Dreams.

Musicians

- Margaret Urlich – vocals, vocal arrangements
- Australian Studio Orchestra – strings (3, 10)
  - Phillip Hartl – string leader
- Nadirah Ali – backing vocals (1, 7, 9)
- Noel MacDonald – backing vocals (3, 8)
- Bob Mann – guitar (1, 7, 9)
- Betty-Anne Monga – backing vocals (3, 8)
- Andrew Oh – alto flute, saxophone (3, 8, 10)
- Patou Powell – backing vocals (3, 8)
- Ian Prince – percussion, programming, backing vocals (1, 7, 9); rhythm arrangements, vocal arrangements
- Mark Punch – guitar (8)
- James Richards – programming (2, 4, 6)
- Sheldon Riley – guitar (1, 7, 9)
- Victor Rounds – guitar (8)
- Robyn Smith – arrangements, guitar, keyboards, programming, string arrangements (3, 8, 10)
- Hamish Stuart – drums (10)
- Tony Swain – guitar (4)

Technical

- Ted Blaisdell – engineering (1, 7, 9)
- Adrian Bolland – engineering (3, 8, 10)
- Michael H. Brauer – remixing (3, 10)
- Ian Prince – production (1, 7, 9)
- James Richards – engineering (2, 4, 6)
- Robyn Smith – production (3, 8, 10)
- Tony Swain – production (2, 4, 6)
- Tim Young – mastering

Design

- Daniela Federici – photography
- Richie Nicholson – photography

== Charts ==
Chart (1992)	Peak position
Australian Albums (ARIA)	5
New Zealand Albums (RMNZ)	18

== Certifications ==
Region	Certification	Certified units/sales
Australia (ARIA)	Platinum	70,000^{^}
^{^} Shipments figures based on certification alone.

== Awards and recognition ==
1992	World Music Awards	Best Selling New Zealand Artist of the Year	Won
1993	ARIA Awards.	Best Female Artist	Nominated
1993	ARIA Awards.	Engineer of the Year	Nominated
1994	ARIA Awards	Best Female Artist	Nominated
