= Every Little Thing =

Every Little Thing may refer to:

== Music ==
- Every Little Thing (album), 2017 album by Carly Pearce
- Every Little Thing (band), a Japanese pop duo debuting in 1996

=== Songs ===
- "Ev'ry Little Thing", song by Pat Boone on the album Howdy! 1957
- "Every Little Thing" (Beatles song), 1964
- "Every Little Thing" (Jeff Lynne song), 1990
- "Every Little Thing" (Kate Ceberano song), 1991
- "Every Little Thing" (Carlene Carter song), 1993
- "Every Little Thing" (Margaret Ulrich song) 1995
- "Every Little Thing" (Delirious? song), 2003
- "Every Little Thing" (Eric Clapton song), 2013
- "Every Little Thing", song by Röyksopp and Robyn on the EP Do It Again 2014
- "Every Little Thing" (Carly Pearce song), 2017
- "Every Little Thing" (Russell Dickerson song), 2018

== Other uses ==
- Every Little Thing, a documentary podcast started by Gimlet Media in 2017
- Every Little Thing (film), a 2024 Australian documentary film written and directed by Sally Aitken

== See also ==
- "Every Little Thing I Do", a 1959 song by Dion & The Belmonts
- "Every Little Thing I Do", a 1995 song by Soul 4 Real
- "Every Little Thing She Does Is Magic", a 1981 song by The Police
- "Every Little Thing You Do", a 2000 song by Westlife from Coast to Coast
