= (I Don't Want to Be) Second Best =

Single by Margaret Urlich

from the album Chameleon Dreams
- B-side: "Escaping" (live)
- Released: 1 March 1993
- Genre: Pop
- Length: 4:50
- Label: Columbia
- Songwriter(s): Margaret Urlich, T Swain
- Producer(s): T Swain

Margaret Urlich singles chronology
"Human Race" (1992)	"(I Don't Want to Be) Second Best" (1993)	"Burnt Sienna" (1993)

"(I Don't Want to Be) Second Best" is a song from New Zealand singer Margaret Urlich. The song was released in March 1993 as the third single from her second studio album, Chameleon Dreams. The song peaked at number 39 in New Zealand.

== Track listing ==
CD single/7" (Columbia 659003.1)

1. "(I Don't Want to Be) Second Best"
2. "Escaping" (live version; recorded in December 1992)
3. "(I Don't Want to Be) Second Best" (extended version)

== Charts ==
Chart performance for "(I Don't Want to Be) Second Best"
Chart (1993)	Peak position
Australia (ARIA)	132
New Zealand (Recorded Music NZ)	39
