= California Dreaming (Rick Price and Jack Jones album) =

Studio album by Rick Price and Jack Jones
- Released: 29 September 2017
- Recorded: 2017
- Studios: Nashville, United States of America
- Genre: Pop
- Length: 46:45
- Label: Sony Music Australia

Rick Price albums chronology
Tennessee Sky (2015)	California Dreaming (2017)	Soulville (2021)

Jack Jones chronology
Made in China (2007)	California Dreaming (2017)	Christmas Is Nearing (2019)

Singles from California Dreaming
- 1. "California Dreamin'" Released: 25 August 2017

California Dreaming is Rick's ninth studio album which is a 2017 collaborative album of covers by Australian singer-songwriters and musicians Rick Price and Jack Jones. The album sees Rick and Jack teaming together to re-imagine their favourite songs of the 1960s and 1970s California Sound era. The album was produced in Nashville by Sony executive Robert Rigby and is released through Sony Music Australia. The eponymous first single, by The Mamas & the Papas, was released in August. Songs from the album include hits by Neil Young and the Eagles. The album was released digitally and physically on 29 September and peaked at number 7 on the ARIA charts.

In October 2017, the duo announced Australian tour dates for May 2018. Jones said "Rick and I have been talking about doing something for close to two decades… it was a great opportunity to work together and celebrate great artists, some great songs and a certain time and genre. That period in music will never be repeated again. And now we get to play them live!"

== Background and release ==
In a statement, Price said: "I felt we needed to pay homage to these songs and be respectful to the melodies and arrangements and not drift too far off the reservation. But, at the same time we wanted to add some things here and there that made a difference."

Price and Jones' friendship dates back to the early 1990s when Jones was the lead singer of pop band Southern Sons. Both artists have released platinum selling albums.

Jones stated: "Rick and I have been talking about doing something for close to two decades... it was a great opportunity to work together and celebrate great artists, some great songs and a certain time and genre. That period in music will never be repeated again.

== Reception ==
Stack Magazine said "What a magical combination this is – two guys who can sing like angels with a songbook that's second to none."

Geoff Jenke from Event Adelaide said the album was a "stellar set of songs beautifully recorded" but said "the problem is they are so faithful to the originals, it has you wanting to drag the originals out and play them."

== Track listing ==
No.	Title	Writer(s)	Length
1.	"California Dreamin'" (The Mamas & the Papas song)	John Phillips; Michelle Phillips	3:16
2.	"Turn! Turn! Turn (To Everything There Is A Season!)" (The Byrds song)	Pete Seeger	4:01
3.	"Blue Bayou" (Roy Orbison and Linda Ronstadt song)	Roy Orbison; Joe Melson	3:57
4.	"Monday, Monday" (The Mamas and the Papas song)	John Phillips	3:51
5.	"Light My Fire" (The Doors song)	Jim Morrison; Robbie Krieger; John Densmore; Ray Manzarek	3:58
6.	"Both Sides, Now" (Joni Mitchell/Judy Collins song)	Joni Mitchell	4:46
7.	"Take It Easy" (Eagles song)	Jackson Browne; Glenn Frey	3:36
8.	"Heart of Gold" (Neil Young song)	Neil Young	3:07
9.	"Desperado" (Eagles song)	Glenn Frey; Don Henley	3:45
10.	"Teach Your Children" (Crosby, Stills, Nash & Young song)	Graham Nash	2:57
11.	"Running on Empty" (Jackson Browne song)	Jackson Browne	4:50
12.	"Fire and Rain" (James Taylor song)	James Taylor	4:41

== Charts ==
Chart (2017)	Peak position
Australian Albums (ARIA)	7

== California Dreaming Tour 2018 ==
In May 2018, Price and Jones had scheduled to tour the album around venues around Australia, but the tour was cancelled without giving any reasons. Price then announced he would instead tour later in the year his Heaven Knows album, Knows but even that turned out to be too much to ask, because that tour didn't eventuate either. Reportedly, the duo are still planning to finally tour the "California Dreaming" album, but as of now, no dates are being discussed.

== Release history ==
Country	Date	Format	Label	Catalogue
Australia	29 September 2017	CD; digital download	Sony Music Australia	88985436272
Australia	24 November 2017	Vinyl	Sony Music Australia	88985436271
