= APRA Music Awards of 1995 =

Annual Australian music awards

- Date: May 1995
- Location: Australia
- Website: apra-amcos.com.au

The Australasian Performing Right Association Awards of 1995 (generally known as APRA Awards) are a series of awards held in May 1995. The APRA Music Awards were presented by Australasian Performing Right Association (APRA) and the Australasian Mechanical Copyright Owners Society (AMCOS).

== Awards ==
Winners are shown in bold with known nominees shown in plain.

| Category | Details | Result |
|---|---|---|
| Songwriter of the Year | **Daniel Johns**, **Benjamin Gillies** | Won |
| Ted Albert Memorial Award | **Harry Vanda**, **George Young** | Won |
| Song of the Year | "Private Universe" by Crowded House | Nominated |
| Song of the Year | "River of Love" by Rick Price (Harold Fields / Rick Price) | Nominated |
| Song of the Year | **"My Island Home"** (**Neil Murray**) by **Christine Anu** | Won |
| Song of the Year | "Coma" by Max Sharam (Max Sharam) | Nominated |
| Song of the Year | "Mouth" by Merril Bainbridge (Merril Bainbridge) | Nominated |
| Most Performed Country Work | | Nominated |
| Most Performed Country Work | | Nominated |
| Most Performed Country Work | | Nominated |
| Most Performed Country Work | | Nominated |
| Most Performed Country Work | **"Tropical Fever"** (**John Williamson**) by **John Williamson** | Won |
| Most Performed Contemporary Classical Composition | | Nominated |
| Most Performed Contemporary Classical Composition | **"Conercto for Guitar and Chamber Orchestra"** (**Philip Bračanin**) by **Karin Schaupp** | Won |
| Most Performed Contemporary Classical Composition | | Nominated |
| Most Performed Contemporary Classical Composition | | Nominated |
| Most Performed Contemporary Classical Composition | | Nominated |
| Most Performed Children's Work | **"Can You (Point Your Fingers and Do the Twist)"** (**Murray Cook**, **Jeffrey Fatt**, **Anthony Field**, **John Field**, **Gregory Page**) by **The Wiggles** | Won |
| Most Performed Children's Work | "Have a Beaut Day" (Allan Caswell, Don Spencer) by Don Spencer | Nominated |
| Most Performed Children's Work | "Nicky Nacky Nocky Noo" (Murray Cook, Jeffrey Fatt, Anthony Field, Gregory Page) by The Wiggles | Nominated |
| Most Performed Children's Work | "Stand Up" (Allan Caswell, Don Spencer) by Don Spencer | Nominated |
| Most Performed Children's Work | "We Like Wearing Pyjamas" (Franciscus Antheunis p.k.a. Franciscus Henri) by Bananas in Pyjamas | Nominated |
| Most Performed Jazz Work | | Nominated |
| Most Performed Jazz Work | | Nominated |
| Most Performed Jazz Work | | Nominated |
| Most Performed Jazz Work | | Nominated |
| Most Performed Jazz Work | | Nominated |
| Most Performed Jazz Work | **What This Love Can Do** (**Sandra Evans**) by **Sandy Evans** | Won |
| Most Performed Foreign Work | **"All I Wanna Do"** (**David Baerwald**, **Bill Bottrell**, **Sheryl Crow**, **Wyn Cooper**, **Kevin Gilbert**) by **Sheryl Crow** | Won |
| Most Performed Foreign Work | | Nominated |
| Most Performed Foreign Work | | Nominated |
| Most Performed Foreign Work | | Nominated |
| Most Performed Foreign Work | | Nominated |
| Most Performed Australian Work | | Nominated |
| Most Performed Australian Work | | Nominated |
| Most Performed Australian Work | | Nominated |
| Most Performed Australian Work | **"Standing Strong" (Wendy Matthews)** by **Wendy Matthews** | Won |
| Most Performed Australian Work | | Nominated |
| Most Performed Australian Work Overseas | **"Big Gun"** (**Brian Johnson**, **Angus Young**, **Malcolm Young**) by **AC/DC** | Won |
| Most Performed Film Score | | Nominated |
| Most Performed Film Score | | Nominated |
| Most Performed Film Score | **Muriel's Wedding** | Won |
| Most Performed Film Score | | Nominated |
| Most Performed Film Score | | Nominated |
| Most Performed Television Theme | | Nominated |
| Most Performed Television Theme | **Cody** | Won |
| Most Performed Television Theme | | Nominated |
| Most Performed Television Theme | | Nominated |
| Most Performed Television Theme | | Nominated |

== See also ==
- Music of Australia
