= Human Race =

Human Race or The Human Race may refer to:

- Human species
- Race (human categorization), a classification system used to categorize humans into large and distinct populations
- The Human Race (film), 2013 film
- L'Espèce humaine (The Human Race), a 1947 book by Robert Antelme

== Music ==
- "Human Race" (Three Days Grace song), 2015
- "Human Race" (Margaret Urlich song), 1992
- "Human Race", a 1970 song by the Everly Brothers
- "Human Race", a 1979 song by Neil Innes
- "Human Race", a song by Red Rider from their 1983 album Neruda
- "Human Race", a song by Jars of Clay from their 2013 album Inland
