= Tamborine National Park =

National park in Queensland, Australia

- IUCN category II (national park)
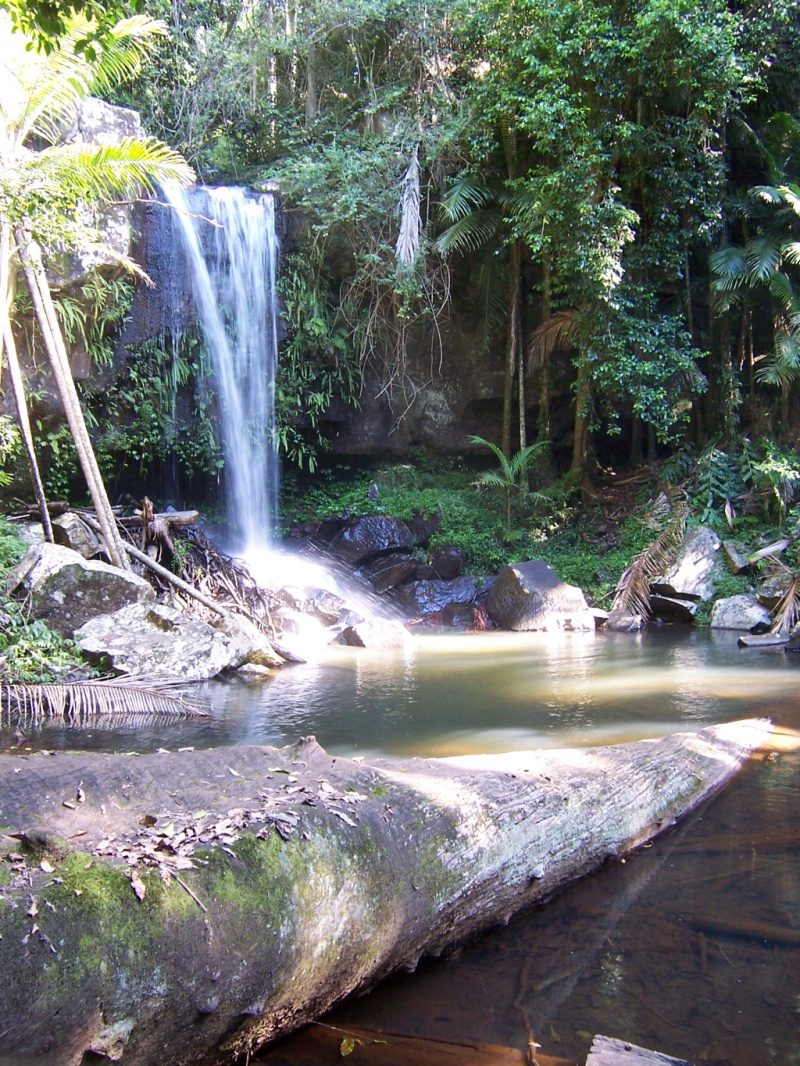
- Curtis Falls in Tamborine National Park

- Location within Queensland
- Location: Queensland
- Coordinates: 27°51′37″S 153°10′42″E
- Area: 11.60 km^{2} (4.48 sq mi)
- Established: 1993
- Visitors: 1,727,000 (domestic visitors only) (in 2012)
- Governing body: Queensland Parks and Wildlife Service
- Website: Official website

Tamborine National Park is a protected area split between the City of Gold Coast and the Scenic Rim Region in South East Queensland, Australia, 67.5 km (41.9 mi) by road south of Brisbane.

It covers 11.60 square kilometres (4.48 sq mi) on the plateau of Tamborine Mountain and around its foothills. The plateau is 8 km (5.0 mi) long, 5 km (3.1 mi) wide and rises to an altitude of 525 m (1,722 ft). The elevation of the plateau keeps the temperature down a little in summer although December to April is also the wettest time to visit. Winter is drier but also cooler.

The protected area is scattered across 14 separate reserves which make up the National Park, interspersed with villages. There are a number of picnic areas as well as scenic drives and many bushwalks to lookouts, gorges, cliffs, waterfalls, rainforest areas, wet eucalypt forest, open forest and woodlands.

Wildlife in the park includes Lyrebirds, the elusive platypus, brush-turkeys, lorikeets, eastern whipbirds and satin bowerbirds. The significance of the park is underscored by the fact that it provides habitat for 85% of all fauna species and 65% of all flora species in the Scenic Rim Regional Council area. Camping is not permitted in any part of the park. A range of small-scale cottages, bed-and-breakfast style accommodation, hotels and motels is available.

The main areas to visit in the park are Joalah, Cedar Creek, The Knoll, MacDonald Park, Niche's Corner, Palm Grove and Witches Falls. All have picnic facilities and walking tracks. All but Cedar Creek have information centres; most have toilets and some have barbecues.

== Witches Falls ==
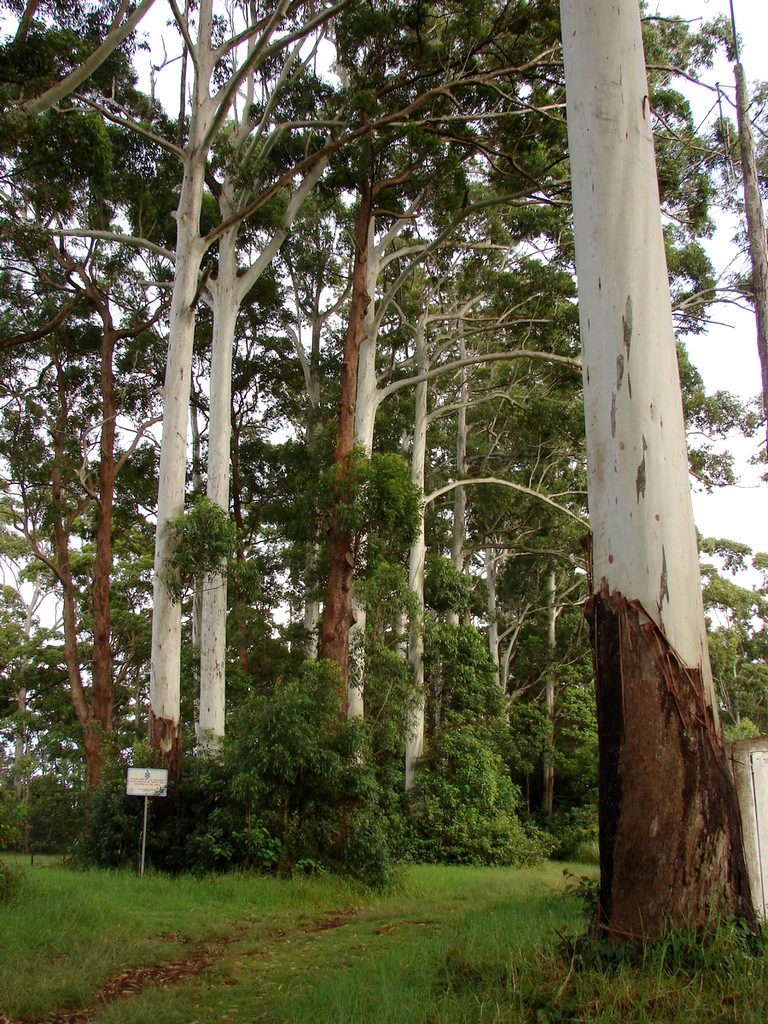
Flooded gums, 2010

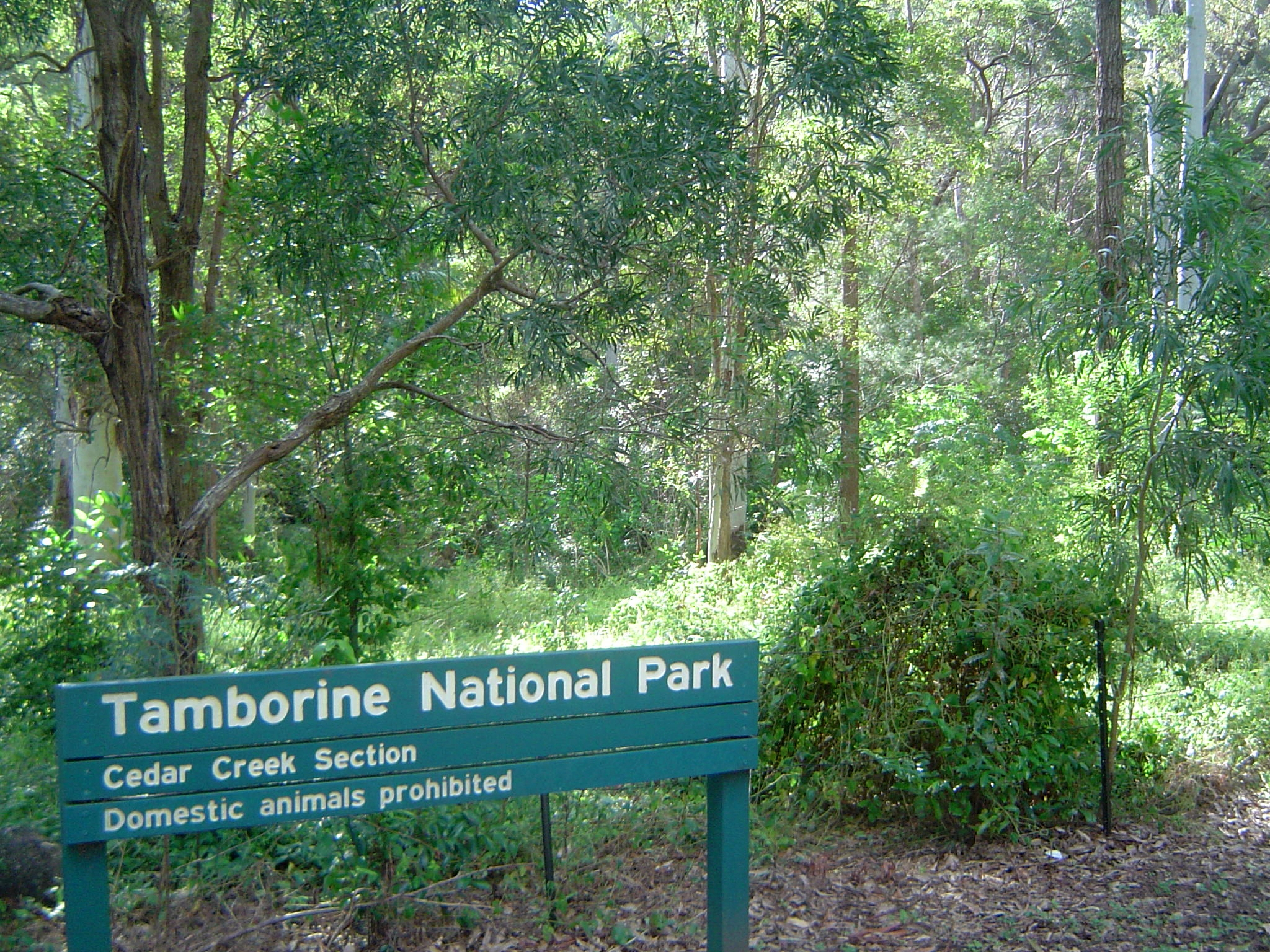
Cedar Creek Falls, 2011

The Witches Falls section, on the eastern side of Mount Tamborine village, became Queensland's first national park in 1908. The main walk here is the Witches Falls Circuit (3 km (1.9 mi)) which snakes down a steep slope through closed in forest into rainforest with cycad groves, seasonal lagoons, enormous strangler figs and palm groves, en route to the falls. An alternative way of seeing the falls is via the Beacon Road Track (four km one way). Access is off Main Western Road (also known as Tamborine Mountain Road and Geissmann Drive). Subtropical rainforest containing large red cedar trees and strangler figs is the predominant vegetation here.

== Palm Grove ==
On the western side of Tamborine Mountain village is the Palm Grove section of the park. The Curtis Road Track (1.2 km (0.75 mi) one way) links Curtis Road and Palm Grove Avenue. The Palm Grove Circuit (1.4 km (0.87 mi)) passes through rainforest, fig and palm groves. Curtis Road runs off Tambourine Mountain Road (in Tamborine Mountain) and Palm Grove Avenue runs off Central Avenue in Eagle Heights. The section is named after the piccabeen palms flourishing in the area.

== Joalah ==
In between, and to the north of Witches Falls and Palm Grove, is the Joalah section of the park which features the 1.5 km (0.93 mi) Curtis Falls Walk (return). It descends to a rock pool at the base of the falls, offering fine views of the basalt rock face. Brush-turkeys can be seen along the Joalah Circuit (4 km), which links up with the Curtis Falls Walk. Access is off Eagle Heights Road.

== MacDonald Park ==
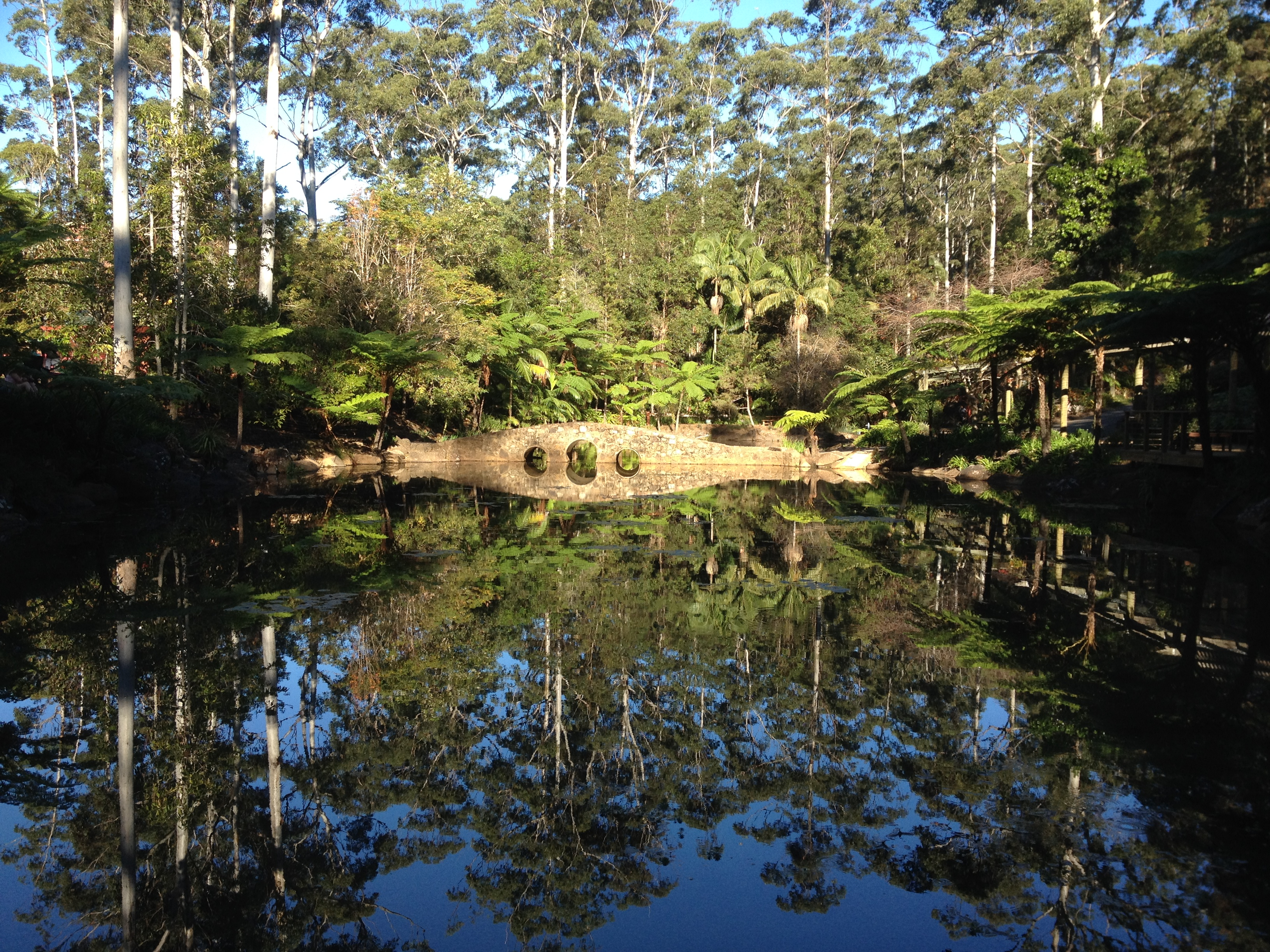
Tamborine Mountain Botanic Gardens

Also in Eagle Heights, adjacent to the Tamborine Mountain Botanic Gardens, is the MacDonald Park section. It has a rainforest circuit (2.6 km (1.6 mi)) wherein the plants are named. Access is off Wangawallan Road.

== The Knoll ==
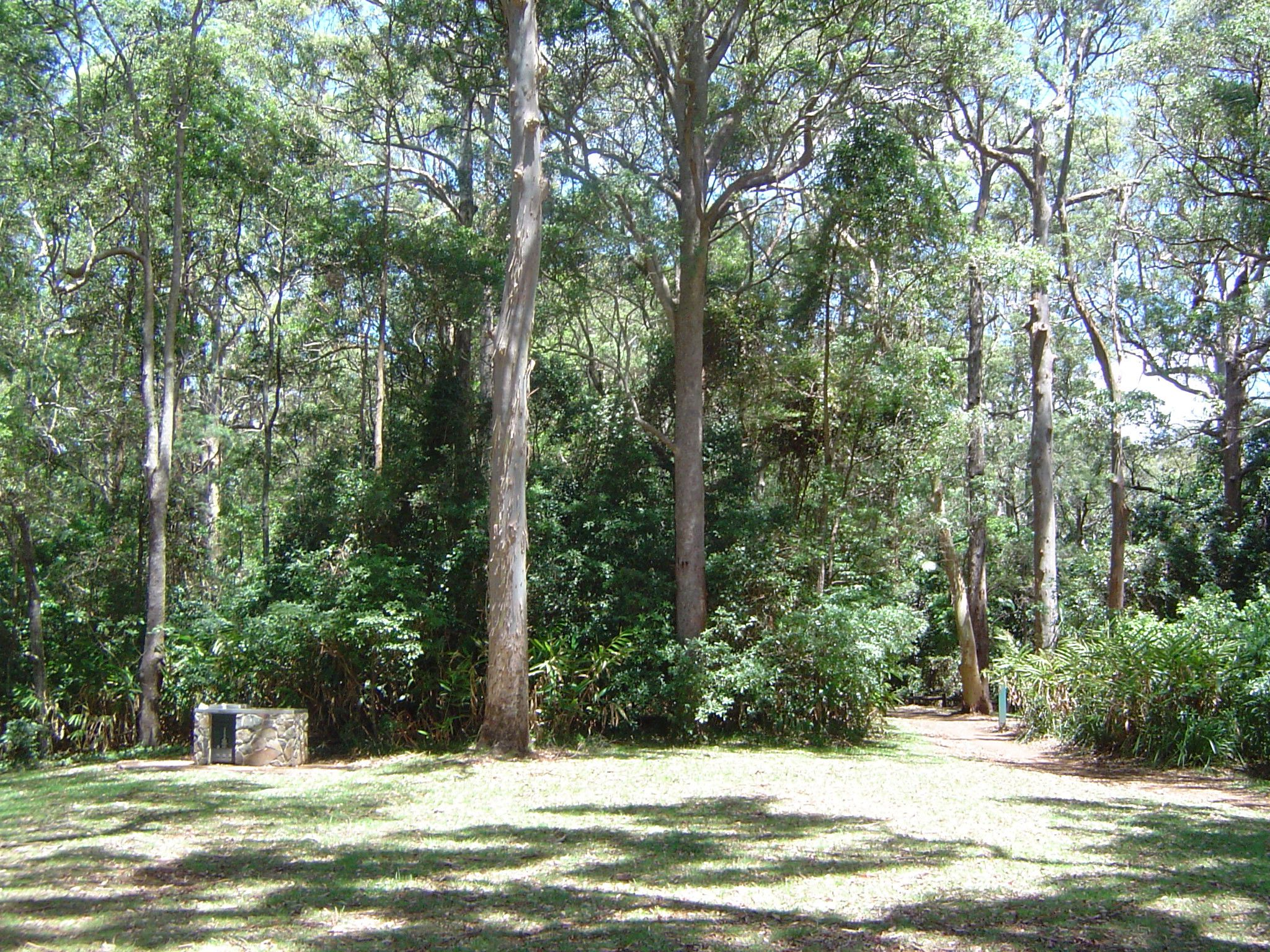
The Knoll picnic area, 2012

The Knoll section of the park is located in the north-west of North Tamborine. It contains the Cameron Falls Circuit (3 km (1.9 mi)) which offers fine views, rainforest environs, open forest and the occasional black skink sunbathing on the rocks. Knoll Road runs off Main Street. The Tamborine Mountains Natural History Association Information Centre is also located in the village of North Tamborine.

Stands of forest she-oak are found at the Knoll as well as the lacebark, an Australian native flowering tree.

== Cedar Creek ==
Heading north from North Tamborine, via Tamborine Mountain Road, there is a turnoff into Cedar Creek Falls Road. One of the most delightful walks in the whole Tamborine area is the Cedar Creek Circuit (3.2 km) which explores the creek's various cascades, rock pools and plant communities, such as open and dry rainforest and hoop pines. The falls tumble (gently rather than spectacularly) down into a gully. The 1.5 km (0.93 mi) Rock Scree Walk intersects with the circuit walk, for a potential detour.

== Niches Corner ==
Located approximately 20 km (12 mi) north of the Knoll and main section of Tamborine Mountain, Niches corner sits looking towards the Gold Coast and delivers expansive views. One of the best walks in the whole Tamborine area is the Niches Lookout Circuit (3.2 km (2.0 mi)) which explores the Niches Corners various cascades, rock pools and plant communities, such as open and dry rainforest and hoop pines.

== See also ==
- Protected areas of Queensland
