= Eagle Heights, Queensland =

Eagle Heights Queensland
- Coordinates: 27.9106°S 153.2019°E
- Established: 1875
- Postcode(s): 4271
- Time zone: AEST (UTC+10:00)
- Location: 33.6 km (21 mi) E of Beaudesert; 72.8 km (45 mi) S of Brisbane CBD
- LGA(s): Scenic Rim Region
- State electorate(s): Scenic Rim
- Federal division(s): Wright

Eagle Heights is a town within the locality of Tamborine Mountain in South East Queensland, Australia.

== History ==
The town is home to the Gold Coast hinterland's oldest remaining church. The St Andrew's Wesleyan Church on Long Road was built in 1880.

Eagle Heights Post Office opened on 1 July 1927 (a receiving office had been open from 1926).

Formerly a suburb in its own right, in 1997, Eagle Heights was merged with other former suburbs North Tamborine and Mount Tamborine to create the larger locality of Tamborine Mountain.

At the 2006 census, Eagle Heights had a population of 2,702.

== See also ==
- Tamborine National Park
