= The Deepest Blue =

Studio album by Margaret Urlich
- Released: July 1995
- Recorded: 301 (Sydney); York Street (Auckland); Marmalade Studios (Wellington); Eclipse (Sydney)
- Genre: Pop
- Length: 50:14
- Label: Columbia
- Producer: Robyn Smith

Margaret Urlich chronology
Live (1994)	The Deepest Blue (1995)	Second Nature (1999)

Singles from The Deepest Blue
- 1. "Gonna Make You Mine" Released: May 1995; 2. "Every Little Thing" Released: August 1995; 3. "All For The Love" Released: 1995

The Deepest Blue is the fourth solo album (third studio album) by Margaret Urlich, released in July 1995 through Columbia Records. In November 2010 the album was re-released in digital form on various online music retail websites, including iTunes in New Zealand and Australia.

== Recording and promotion ==
Recording for The Deepest Blue took place at numerous studios in Sydney, Auckland, and Wellington. Multiple notable Australian and New Zealand musicians contributed to its creation, including singer Daryl Braithwaite - whom Urlich had previously collaborated with on the former's No. 1 single "The Horses" - and Ardijah lead singer Betty-Anne Monga.

Three singles were released to promote the album, with lead "Gonna Make You Mine" reaching the top 30 of the Australian charts and its follow-up "Every Little Thing" peaking at No. 50. Sales of both the singles and the album itself failed to mirror the success of Urlich's previous efforts and none of the three singles charted whatsoever in Urlich's home country of New Zealand. Combined with their inability to market her in the Northern Hemisphere, Sony resultingly dropped Urlich after the release of The Deepest Blue. However, Urlich was pleased with the situation due to her relationship with the label having soured.

== Track listing ==
Track listing and song credits adapted from CD liner notes and Spotify. Except where noted, all tracks are written by Margaret Urlich and Robyn Smith.

No.	Title	Writer(s)	Length
1.	"The Deepest Blue"	Urlich; Smith; Barry Blue	5:17
2.	"Gonna Make You Mine"	Urlich; Smith; Allee Willis	4:11
3.	"All For The Love"		4:24
4.	"Crime To Be That Cool"	Smith; Blue	3:58
5.	"Every Little Thing"		3:15
6.	"Where Were You"		5:08
7.	"Only A Shadow"	Urlich; Smith; Blue	4:45
8.	"Just Before You Go"		5:19
9.	"Now And Forever"		5:02
10.	"Song for The Unknown Child (Lulle)"	Smith; Anonymous	4:07
11.	"Take Me Away"		4:44
Total length:			50:14

== Personnel ==
Credits adapted from CD liner notes.

- Margaret Urlich – lead vocals (all tracks), backing vocals (tracks 1–4, 6–10)
- Robyn Smith – production (all tracks), arrangements (all tracks), backing vocals (track 4), bass (track 5), drums (tracks 2, 4), guitars (tracks 1, 3–6, 9, 10), keyboards (tracks 1–4, 6–10), percussion (tracks 1, 2, 4, 6–9), piano (tracks 1–3, 7–11)
- Bruno Barrett-Garnier – engineering
- Daryl Braithwaite – backing vocals (track 7)
- The Brasstards – brass ensemble (track 7)
- Melanie Bridge – album art photography
- Mike Caen – guitar (tracks 1, 2)
- Mark Costa – bass (track 7)
- John Gallen – engineering, mixing
- Ted Jensen – mastering
- "Max & Jack" – engineering assistance
- Betty-Anne Monga – backing vocals (tracks 1–3, 9)
- Toni Mott – backing vocals (tracks 1, 3, 9)
- Phil Munro – engineering assistance
- Paula Nightingale – album art design
- Emma Pezzack – album art hair, make-up, & styling
- Mark Punch – guitar (track 7)
- Gordon Rytmeister – drums (track 5)
- Kevin Shirley – engineering, mixing
- Simon Smart – oboe (track 1)
- Hamish Stewart – drums (tracks 1, 3, 6, 7, 9)
- Studios 301 staff – hand claps (track 5)
- Jenny Sullivan – album art typography
- Chad Wackerman – drums (track 2)
- Malcolm Welsford – engineering
- Kevin Wilkins – album art direction
- Mark Williams – backing vocals (tracks 1, 3, 9)
- Trent Williamson – harmonica (tracks 5, 10)

== Charts ==
The album debuted at number 18 in Australia, before peaking at 17 the following week. The album remained in the top 50 for 8 weeks.

=== Weekly charts ===
Weekly chart performance for The Deepest Blue
Chart (1995)	Peak position
Australian Albums (ARIA)	17
New Zealand Albums (RMNZ)	18
