= Guilty People =

Single by Margaret Urlich

from the album Safety in Numbers
- B-side: "Give Me Some Credit"
- Released: 11 February 1991
- Studio: 301 Studios, Sydney, Australia
- Genre: Pop, Synth pop
- Length: 4:56
- Label: CBS
- Songwriters: Robyn Smith, Barry Blue
- Producer: Robyn Smith

Margaret Urlich singles chronology
| "Only My Heart Calling" (1990) | "Guilty People" (1991) | "Boy in the Moon" (1992) |

"Guilty People" is a song by New Zealand singer Margaret Urlich. The single was released in February 1991 as the fourth and final single from her debut and New Zealand Music Awards and ARIA award-winning studio album, Safety in Numbers (1989). The song features on her 1994 live album Live.

== Track listing ==
CD single/7" (CBS 656627 7)

1. "Guilty People" (Maera Mix) – 4:56
2. "Give Me Some Credit" – 5:41

== Charts ==
Chart performance for "Guilty People"
| Chart (1991) | Peak position |
|---|---|
| Australia (ARIA) | 99 |
