= Only My Heart Calling =

Single by Margaret Urlich

from the album Safety in Numbers
- B-side: "Something in the Air"
- Released: 14 May 1990
- Studio: 301 Studios, Sydney, Australia
- Genre: Pop
- Length: 5:38
- Label: CBS
- Songwriter: Robyn Smith
- Producer: Robyn Smith

Margaret Urlich singles chronology
"Number One (Remember When We Danced All Night)" (1990)	"Only My Heart Calling" (1990)	"Guilty People" (1991)

"Only My Heart Calling" is a song from New Zealand singer Margaret Urlich. Released in May 1990, it was the third single from her debut studio album, Safety in Numbers. Although only peaking at number 46, the single spent 22 weeks on the Australian top 100 singles chart. The song features on her 1994 live album Live.

== Track listing ==
CD single (CBS 655924 2)

1. "Only My Heart Calling" – 5:38
2. "Something in the Air"
3. "Slip On By" (Live)

== Charts ==
Chart performance for "Only My Heart Calling"
Chart (1990)	Peak position
Australia (ARIA)	46

2022 chart performance for "Only My Heart Calling"
Chart (2022)	Peak position
Australia Digital Tracks (ARIA)	25
