= Gonna Make You Mine =

Single by Margaret Urlich

from the album The Deepest Blue
- B-side: "Just Before You Go"
- Released: 17 April 1995
- Genre: Pop, synth pop
- Length: 4:10
- Label: Columbia
- Songwriter(s): Robyn Smith, Willis, Margaret Urlich
- Producer(s): Robyn Smith

Margaret Urlich singles chronology
"All By Myself" (1994)	"Gonna Make You Mine" (1995)	"Every Little Thing" (1995)

"Gonna Make You Mine" is a song from New Zealand singer Margaret Urlich. The song was released in April 1995 as the lead single from her third studio album, The Deepest Blue. The song peaked at number 29 in Australia in June 1995.

== Track listing ==
CD single/7" (Columbia 661362.2)

1. "Gonna Make You Mine" – 4:10
2. "Just Before You Go" – 5:19

== Charts ==
Chart performance for "Gonna Make You Mine"
Chart (1995)	Peak position
Australia (ARIA)	29
