= Essential =

Essential or essentials may refer to:

== Biology ==
- Essential amino acid, one that the organism cannot produce by itself

== Groups and organizations ==
- EQ Media Group, formerly Essential Media Group, a global television production company
- Essential Media Communications, an Australian PR and polling company
- Essential Products, a smart device company led by Andy Rubin
- Essential Records (London), a subsidiary of London Records
- Essential Records (Christian), a Christian subsidiary of Sony BMG Music Entertainment
- The Essentials (band), a Canadian a cappella group formed in 1993
- Essentials (PlayStation), a budget package of PlayStation games

== Albums ==
- Essential (Divinyls album), a compilation album, 1991
- Essential (Pet Shop Boys album), 1998
- Essential (Ramones album), 2007
- Essential (CeCe Peniston album), 2000
- Essential (Jethro Tull album)
- Essential (Kate Ryan album), 2008
- Essential (Praga Khan album), 2005
- Essentials (Nate Dogg album), a compilation album, 2002
- Essentials (Failure album), 2006
- Essentials, a studio album by Argentine jazz singer Karen Souza, 2011
- Essential, a compilation album by Amanda Lear, 2001
- Essential, a compilation album by The Human League, 2011
- Essentials, an album by Travis Tritt
- Essentials, an album by Triumvirat
- Essential series, a collection of compilation albums published by Sony's Legacy Recordings label

== Other uses ==
- Essentialism, the philosophical view that an entity must have certain characteristics in order to belong to a certain defined group
- Essentials (magazine), a monthly British women's lifestyle magazine
- Essentials, a clothing label founded by Jerry Lorenzo
- SBS Essential, a defunct Australian television channel

== See also ==
- The Essential (disambiguation)
- The Essentials (disambiguation)
- Essence
