= Tennessee Sky =

Studio album by Rick Price
- Released: 25 April 2015
- Genre: Pop, gospel
- Label: Clarice Records

Rick Price chronology
The Water's Edge (2011)	Tennessee Sky (2015)	California Dreaming (2017)

Singles from Tennessee Sky
- 1. "Work That Fire" Released: 2015; 2. "You're Not Alone" Released: 12 August 2016

Tennessee Sky is the eighth studio album by Australian singer-songwriter Rick Price, released 25 April 2015 on Clarice Records, through the PledgeMusic campaign. It peaked at number 97 on the ARIA Charts and number 19 on the Australian Indie chart on 4 May 2015.

== Album synopsis ==
Describing the album, Price said; “I’ve never done a record like this before, not this kind of music. A lot of it is very gospel based. Some of it is just like Texas swing music. Some of it sounds like an old hymn. It’s drawing on old roots based music.”

Price toured Australia in July 2015 and again on the 'Can I Get a Witness' tour in April/May 2016.

The first single from the album, "Work That Fire" was released on 3 October 2014. Price said: “It has its roots in gospel. It’s a really kind of upbeat song. I’m not religious but I’ve written a lot of spiritual songs I guess.” There is an acoustic re-working of the Leonard Cohen hit "Hallelujah". The album features guest appearances by guitarist Tommy Emmanuel and singer Anthony Snape.

== Reviews ==
Steve Yanko of Sy Music gave the album a positive review saying "In an era where a lot of pop music is created by talented producers using a lot of studio technology, it is so refreshing to hear wonderful songs using real instruments and great musicianship. More impressive is that Rick Price is playing most of the instruments himself on this album", adding Tennessee Sky "is fresh and uplifting."

== Track listing ==
CD/DD
No.	Title	Writer(s)	Length
1.	"Work That Fire"		3:49
2.	"Light on the River Jordan"		4:14
3.	"Days of Gold" (with Anthony Snape & Tommy Emmanuel)		3:09
4.	"Can I Get a Witness"		3:53
5.	"No More Tears to Cry"		2:49
6.	"The Heart You Left Behind"		5:20
7.	"Tennessee Sky"		4:22
8.	"Dead Man Walkin'"		3:34
9.	"You Are Not Alone"		4:29
10.	"Until We Meet Again"		3:43
11.	"Hallelujah"	Leonard Cohen	4:18

== Charts ==
The album was Price's first album to chart in the ARIA top 100 since Another Place in 1999.

Chart (2015)	Peak position
Australia (ARIA)	97

== Release history ==
Region	Date	Format	Label	Catalogue
Australia	25 April 2015	CD, digital download	Clarice Records	
