= Safety in Numbers (Margaret Urlich album) =

Studio album by Margaret Urlich
- Released: NZ 10 November 1989; Australia 9 March 1990
- Recorded: 1988–89
- Studio: Studios 301
- Genre: Pop
- Label: CBS
- Producers: Robyn Smith; Jim Taig; Phil Whichett; Peter Bondy

Margaret Urlich chronology
Safety in Numbers (1989)	Chameleon Dreams (1992)

Singles from Safety in Numbers
- 1. "Escaping" Released: September 1989; 2. "Number One (Remember When We Danced All Night)" Released: February 1990; 3. "Only My Heart Calling" Released: May 1990; 4. "Guilty People" Released: February 1991

Safety in Numbers is the debut solo album by New Zealand singer Margaret Urlich, released in 1989. The first single, "Escaping", was number one for three consecutive weeks in New Zealand and peaked at number 17 in Australia. Urlich won an ARIA Award in 1991 for Best Breakthrough Artist - Album for Safety in Numbers. The album achieved platinum status in New Zealand and triple platinum status in Australia. Safety in Numbers has sold over 265,000 copies. It was recorded at Studios 301 in Sydney, Australia, mostly between August and November 1988 but also in April 1989.

== Track listing ==
Side one
No.	Title	Writer(s)	Length
1.	"Escaping"	Robyn Smith; Barry Blue	4:36
2.	"Number One (Remember When We Danced All Night)"	David Tyson; Dean McTaggart	4:08
3.	"Only My Heart Calling"	Smith	5:39
4.	"Give Me Some Credit"	Margaret Urlich	5:42
5.	"Guilty People"	Smith; Blue	5:21

Side two
No.	Title	Writer(s)	Length
6.	"The Tide Keeps Rolling In"	Urlich	4:28
7.	"Your Love"	Harry Vanda; George Young	4:32
8.	"Open Up"	Dave Dobbyn	4:05
9.	"Slip On By"	Smith; Urlich	4:56
10.	"Deep Down"	Smith	4:26
11.	"God Bless The Child"	Arthur Herzog Jr.; Billie Holiday	3:54

Adapted from album notes and Spotify.

== Personnel ==
Credits adapted from cassette liner notes.

- Margaret Urlich – lead vocals, arrangements (track 11), backing vocals (tracks 3, 4, 6, 8–10), keyboards (track 11)
- Robyn Smith – production (tracks 1–10), arrangements (tracks 1–10), acoustic guitar (track 3), drums (tracks 1–10), keyboards (tracks 1–10), guitar (track 1), Milo tin (track 1), sitar (track 7)
- Adrian Bolland – engineering (tracks 1, 2, 7), mixing (tracks 1, 2, 5, 7, 8, 10)
- Peter Bondy – additional production (track 11), keyboards (track 11)
- Peter Cobbin – mixing (track 11), synthesizer (track 11)
- Angelique Cooper – recording engineering assistance (track 11)
- Colin Simpkins – recording engineering assistance
- Jim Taig – production (track 11), mixing (tracks 3, 4, 6, 9), recording (track 11)
- Sid Wells – engineering (tracks 3–6, 8–10)
- Phil Whichett – production (track 11), musical direction (track 11)
- Kristen Wolek – recording engineering assistance
- Leon Zervos – mastering
- Karen Boddington – backing vocals (tracks 1–3, 5, 7–9)
- Alan Davey – flugelhorn (track 9)
- Tommy Emmanuel – guitar (track 5)
- Merran Laginestra – backing vocals (tracks 1, 2, 7)
- Geoff Lundgren – fretless bass (track 11)
- Andrew Oh – saxophone (tracks 2, 5, 6)
- Mark Punch – backing vocals (track 8–10), guitar (tracks 2, 4, 6–10)
- Mark Williams – backing vocals (tracks 1–3, 5, 7)
- Polly Walker – photography
- Debbie Watson – hair, makeup, and styling

== Charts ==
=== Weekly charts ===
Weekly chart performance for Safety in Numbers
Chart (1989/1990)	Peak position
Australian Albums (ARIA)	5
New Zealand Albums (RMNZ)	4

=== Year-end charts ===
Year-end chart performance for Safety in Numbers
Chart (1990)	Peak position
Australian Albums (ARIA)	13

== Certifications ==
Region	Certification	Certified units/sales
Australia (ARIA)	3× Platinum	210,000^{^}
New Zealand (RMNZ)	Gold	7,500^{^}
^{^} Shipments figures based on certification alone.

== Awards and recognition ==
Year	Award-giving body	Award	Result
1989	New Zealand Music Awards	Album of the Year	Won
1989	New Zealand Music Awards	Single of the Year	Won
1989	New Zealand Music Awards	Best Female Vocalist	Won
1989	New Zealand Music Awards	Best Album Cover	Won
1990	New Zealand Music Awards	Best Female Vocalist	Won
1991	ARIA Awards	Breakthrough Artist	Won
