= What's Wrong with That Girl =

1992 single by Rick Price

Single by Rick Price

from the album Heaven Knows
- B-side: "We've Got Each Other"
- Released: 14 September 1992
- Length: 4:10
- Label: Columbia
- Songwriter(s): Mark Buckle, Rick Price
- Producer(s): Chris Lord-Alge

Rick Price singles chronology
"Heaven Knows" (1992)	"What's Wrong with That Girl" (1992)	"A House Divided" (1993)

"What's Wrong with That Girl" is a song by Australian singer-songwriter Rick Price. It was released as the third single from his debut studio album, Heaven Knows, in September 1992. The song peaked at No. 45 in Australia.

== Track listing ==
CD single

1. "What's Wrong With That Girl" – 4:10
2. "We've Got Each Other"
3. "Not a Day Goes By" (live acoustic version) – 3:32

== Charts ==
Weekly chart performance for "What's Wrong with That Girl"
Chart (1992)	Peak position
Australia (ARIA)	45
