= The Essentials =

The Essentials may refer to:

- Maliq & D'Essentials, an Indonesian jazz group
- The Essentials (band), a Canadian a cappella group 1993–2011
- The Essentials (TV program), an American program on Turner Classic Movies

== Albums ==
- The Essentials (Alice Cooper album), 2002
- The Essentials (Bananarama album), 2002
- The Essentials (The Cars album), 2005
- The Essentials (Harry Chapin album), 2002
- The Essentials (Ice Cube album), 2008
- The Essentials (Jack Johnson album), 2018
- The Essentials (Laura Branigan album), 2002
- The Essentials (Patrice Rushen album), 2002
- The Essentials (Twisted Sister album), 2002
- The Essentials, by Devo, 2002
- The Essentials, by Little Feat, 2005

== See also ==
- Essential (disambiguation)
- The Essential (disambiguation)
