= The Water's Edge =

Studio album by Rick Price
- Released: 18 September 2011
- Genre: Pop, Country music
- Label: Clarice Records

Rick Price chronology
The Essential Rick Price (2010)	The Water's Edge (2011)	Tennessee Sky (2015)

Singles from The Waters Edge
- 1. "The Waters Edge" Released: 2011; 2. "Shape of my Heart" Released: 2012; 3. "Im Coming Home"

The Water's Edge is the seventh studio album by Australian singer songwriter Rick Price. The album was released on 18 September 2011 through Clarice Records. It was Price's first album of new recordings since A Million Miles in 2003.

Rick Price toured the album throughout Australia in April/March in 2012 and again in July/August 2013. The album featured three singles, including the title track, "Shape of my Heart" and "Im Coming Home"

== Background ==
Price relocated to Nashville United States in 2009, primarily to tour with his great friend Tommy Emmanuel. Following the completion of this tour, Price began to co-write with other artists in Nashville, which led to a new album. During 2011 Price starred in a narrative concert, the theatrical production of The John Denver Story, interpreting the songs and story of John Denver. Backed by a full band, The Colorado Quartet, this production explores the personal life and the passions that drove Denver as an artist and individual. In just eight weeks, Price performed this show to in excess of 26,000 Australian theatre-goers, to overwhelming praise.

== Reviews ==
"The Water’s Edge indicates new influences and a broader style for Rick. While there are still echoes of a great pop artist, even more so, country and blues meld beautifully with folk sounds to create an album that transcends genre.". “The best album I have listened to in the past 20 years” - Mick King, Guitarist. “I listen to this CD as I travel in my car, it is pure genius” - Brian Lizotte, Owner, Australia’s top live entertainment venue.

== Track listing ==
CD/DD
No.	Title	Writer(s)	Length
1.	"The Water's Edge"		2:52
2.	"I've Got It Good"		4:42
3.	"Shape of My Heart"		4:26
4.	"Angels"		3:47
5.	"I'm Coming Home"		3:15
6.	"River"	Joni Mitchell	4:11
7.	"Killin' the Blues"	Rowland Salley	3:58
8.	"It Starts With a Kiss"		4:20
9.	"When I Fell For You"		4:01
10.	"The Last Goodbye"		3:40

== Release history ==
Region	Date	Format	Label	Catalogue
Australia	18 September 2011	CD, Music download	Clarice Records	CLR1203
