= North Tamborine, Queensland =

North Tamborine
- Town
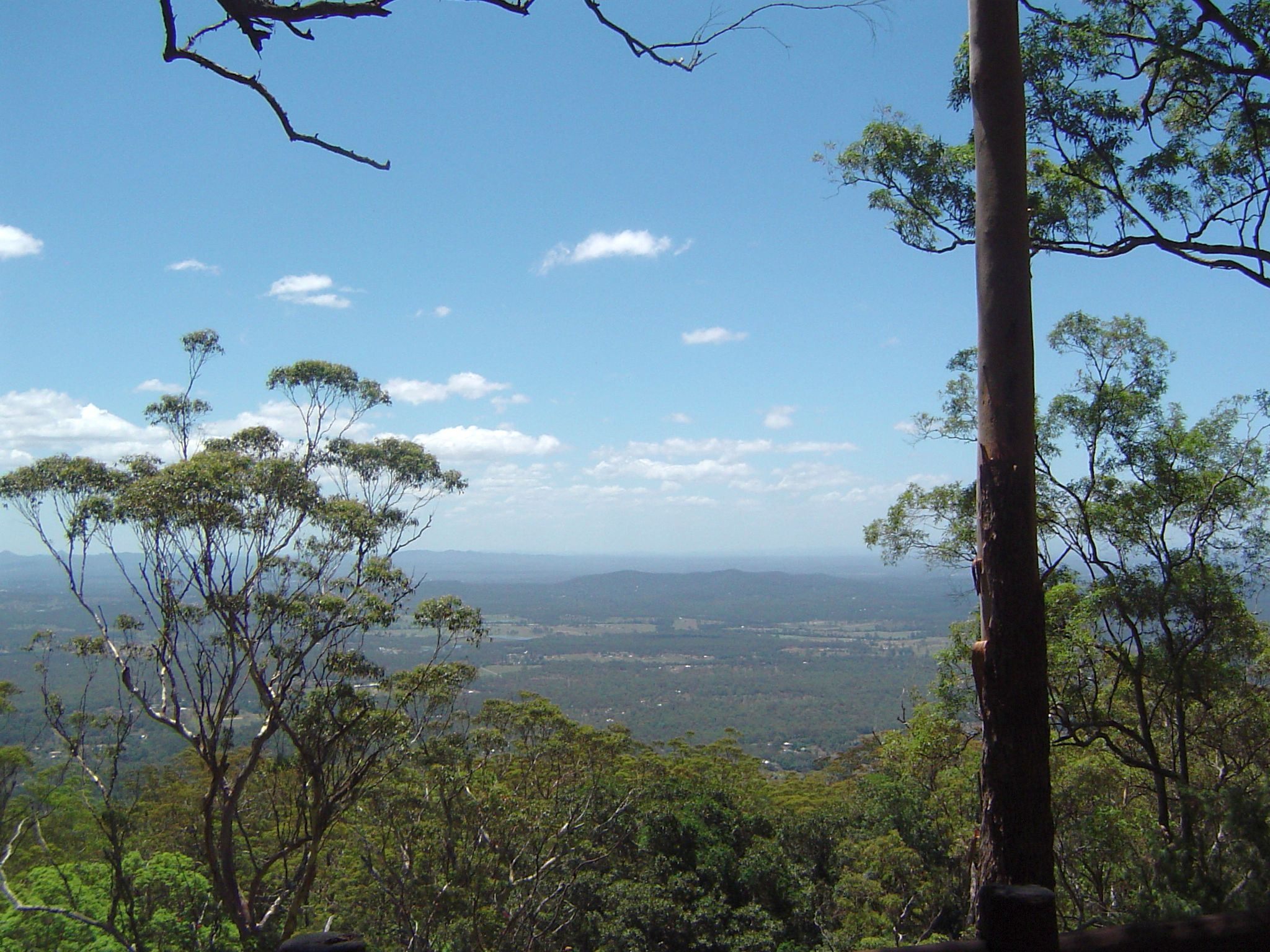
- View from The Knoll

- Coordinates: 27.9231°S 153.2074°E
- Country: Australia
- State: Queensland
- City: Tamborine Mountain
- LGA: Scenic Rim Region
- Location: 33.7 km (20.9 mi) SW of Beaudesert; 35.7 km (22.2 mi) NW of Southport; 38.9 km (24.2 mi) NW of Surfers Paradise; 72.9 km (45.3 mi) SSE of Brisbane CBD
- Established: 1875

Government
  - State electorate: Scenic Rim
  - Federal division: Wright
- Time zone: UTC+10:00 (AEST)
- Postcode: 4272

North Tamborine is a rural town in the locality of Tamborine Mountain in the Scenic Rim Region, Queensland, Australia.

== Geography ==
North Tamborine is 72 kilometres (45 mi) south of Brisbane, and 40 kilometres (25 mi) from the Gold Coast.

Prior 2008, it was part of the Beaudesert Shire, in the Gold Coast hinterland.

== History ==
Land in Tambourine North was first sold in 1875, with the first settler being John O' Callaghan.

Sugar-growing began in 1885, but soon after, a flood hit, which halted the industry.

Many early settlers grew maize and grazed dairy cattle. The first guesthouse on the mountain was opened in 1889.

The town was connected by rail in 1915; the line closed in 1936.

A tourist road to the mountain was completed in 1924. The road brought visitors to the area and the North Tamborine village became the centre for social and business activities. North Tamborine Post Office opened by 1922.

A section of Tamborine National Park known as The Knoll protects forests found in the north of the suburb.

Formerly a suburb in its own right, in 1997, North Tamborine was merged with other former suburbs Eagle Heights and Mount Tamborine to create the larger locality of Tamborine Mountain.

== Heritage listings ==
North Tamborine has a number of heritage-listed sites, including:

- Tamborine Mountain Road, Geissmann Drive

== See also ==
- Tamborine National Park
