= Margaret Urlich =

New Zealand singer (1965–2022)

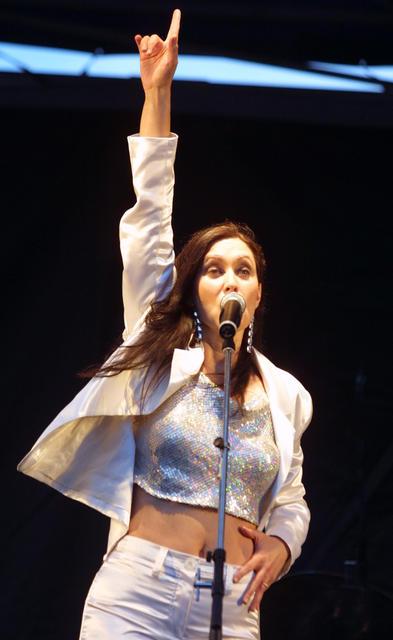
- Urlich performing in Hawke's Bay, 2002

Background information
- Born: Margaret Mary Urlich; 24 January 1965; Auckland, New Zealand
- Died: 22 August 2022 (aged 57) Southern Highlands, New South Wales, Australia
- Genres: Rock; pop; new wave; jazz
- Occupation: Singer
- Instrument: Vocals
- Years active: 1985–2022
- Labels: CBS; Sony; Columbia

Margaret Mary Urlich (24 January 1965 – 22 August 2022) was a New Zealand singer who lived in Australia for most of her career.

Urlich's 1989 debut solo studio album, Safety in Numbers, won "Breakthrough Artist – Album" at the 1991 ARIA Awards. Its 1992 follow-up, Chameleon Dreams, was also a success. Urlich was successful in both New Zealand and Australia, selling over 400,000 albums during her career, ranking her as one of New Zealand's most successful recording artists. She was the cousin of both fellow New Zealand singer Peter Urlich and Australian musician Jen Cloher.

== Life and career ==
Urlich began her career as lead vocalist for the new wave band Peking Man with her brother Pat, Tim Calder, Perry Marshall, Jay F-Bula (Jay Foulkes), Neville Hall, John Fearon. Peking Man won the 1984 Shazam! Battle of The Bands (a TVNZ pop show) and had a number of hit songs in New Zealand, including "Good Luck to You" (No. 6), "Lift Your Head Up High" (No. 21) and 1985's "Room That Echoes" (No. 1).

Urlich was later a member of an all-girl pop group in New Zealand called When the Cat's Away. Urlich moved to Australia in 1988. She recorded her debut solo studio album, Safety in Numbers, at Studios 301 in Sydney and released it in New Zealand in 1989 and Australia in March 1990. The album peaked at No. 4 on the New Zealand album charts in December 1989 and No. 5 on the Australian album charts in December 1990 and went triple platinum in Australia. Urlich won an ARIA Award in 1991 for "Best Breakthrough Artist".

In 1990, Urlich, then little known outside New Zealand, provided backing vocals on a track for Australian artist Daryl Braithwaite on his second solo album, Rise, which was released in November 1990. The song she featured in was the Rickie Lee Jones ballad "The Horses", which was a No. 1 hit for Braithwaite. The video clip featured Braithwaite singing on a beach, with New Zealand model Gillian Mather (riding a horse), lip-syncing Urlich's voice. Urlich chose not to appear in Braithwaite's film clip as she had just released Safety in Numbers and was working to establish herself as a solo artist.

In March 1991, Urlich, armed with a half-million-dollar recording budget, returned to the studio to commence pre-production for her second album, Chameleon Dreams, with English writer/producer Robyn Smith, the man behind her highly successful debut. By mid-year, Urlich and Smith had entered Studios 301 to record their two songs, plus a third track written by Smith and Barry Blue. The same team had been responsible for two of the tracks on Safety in Numbers ("Escaping" and "Guilty People") and their latest offering, "Boy in the Moon", proved pivotal to the sound of the new album. Other tracks were collected by travelling around the world.

Urlich went to London to co-write with writers such as Rob Fisher, with whom she wrote the album's title track, "Chameleon Dreams". She then went on to Los Angeles, where she met with Grammy Award-winning writer/producer Ian Prince, with whom she wrote two songs for the album and he produced four tracks. She returned to London, where she co-wrote a number of songs with Simon Law and Tony Swain, before completing the project with three tracks produced by Swain. The success of Chameleon Dreams earned Urlich the "Best-Selling New Zealand Artist of the Year" award at the 1992 World Music Awards in Monte Carlo. She attended the awards ceremony and performed "Love Train".

In 1993, Urlich was part of Export Music Australia (EMA) and Austrade's second Wizards of Oz promotion. She toured Japan with fellow singer Rick Price and the group Yothu Yindi. Urlich and Dale Barlow recorded a version of "I've Got You Under My Skin" for Kate Ceberano's 1994 album Kate Ceberano and Friends.

She spent much of 1994 living back in New Zealand and appeared as Mary Magdalene in a major concert production of Andrew Lloyd Webber's rock opera Jesus Christ Superstar. Urlich released a version of "I Don't Know How to Love Him" that reached No. 44 on the New Zealand singles charts.

For her third studio album, The Deepest Blue, Urlich returned to her long-standing partnership with British writer/producer Robyn Smith. She and Smith co-wrote all but two of the tracks on the album. The Deepest Blue was released in August 1995 but failed to have the same impact as her previous two albums, reaching No. 18 on the New Zealand charts and No. 17 on the Australian charts.

In 1998, her contract with Sony Music having expired, she moved to the Southern Highlands of New South Wales where she set up home and a new recording studio with her partner. Here she produced her fourth album, Second Nature, a recording project produced by Eddie Rayner from Split Enz that was recorded on and off over 12 months and involved musicians from Australia and New Zealand. The album comprised cover versions of some of Urlich's favourite New Zealand songs that she grew up with. These included songs from artists such as Split Enz, Crowded House, Dave Dobbyn, Max Merritt, Shona Laing, Don McGlashan and Tim Finn. The album was released in New Zealand in 1999 and reached No. 11 on the charts, achieving platinum status. This was her final studio album.

Urlich made a special guest performance on series 1, episode 6 of The Micallef Program, performing a comical duet of the Carly Simon classic "You're So Vain" with Shaun Micallef. The two had previously performed a comical duet of the Frank and Nancy Sinatra song "Somethin' Stupid", with Micallef in his Milo Kerrigan persona, on the sketch comedy programme Full Frontal.

After a two-and-a-half-year struggle with cancer, Urlich died on 22 August 2022, at the age of 57, surrounded by her family at her home in the Southern Highlands.

== Discography ==
=== Studio albums ===
List of studio albums, with selected chart positions and certifications
Title	Album details	Peak chart positions		Certifications
Title	Album details	NZ	AUS	Certifications
Safety in Numbers	Released: November 1989; Label: CBS Records Australia (465652 2); Format: LP, cassette, CD	4	5	NZ: Gold; AUS: 3× Platinum
Chameleon Dreams	Released: 25 September 1992; Label: Columbia (472118-2); Released: LP, cassette, CD	18	5	AUS: Platinum
The Deepest Blue	Released: July 1995; Label: Columbia (478315-2); Format: Cassette, CD	18	17	
Second Nature	Released: May 1999; Label: Sony Music NZ (491251-2); Format: CD	11	—N/a	NZ: Gold
"—" denotes a recording that did not chart or was not released in that territory.

=== Live albums ===
List of live albums
Title	Details
Live	Released: 1994; Label: Columbia (474455-2); Format: CD; Recorded in 1992/1993 during Chameleon Dreams tour

=== Singles ===
Year	Title	Peak chart positions		Album
Year	Title	NZ	AUS	Album
1989	"Escaping"	1	17	Safety in Numbers
1990	"Number One (Remember When We Danced All Night)"	10	24	Safety in Numbers
1990	"Only My Heart Calling"	—	46	Safety in Numbers
1991	"Guilty People / Give Me Some Credit"	—	99	Safety in Numbers
1992	"Boy in the Moon"	9	21	Chameleon Dreams
1992	"Human Race"	—	55	Chameleon Dreams
1993	"(I Don't Want to Be) Second Best"	39	132	Chameleon Dreams
1993	"Burnt Sienna"	—	33	Chameleon Dreams
1993	"Man Overboard"	—	127	Chameleon Dreams
1993	"Where Is the Love" (with Rick Price)	—	31	Live
1994	"I Don't Know How to Love Him"	44	—	Jesus Christ Superstar: New Zealand Cast Recording
1994	"All by Myself"	26	100	Non-album single
1995	"Gonna Make You Mine"	—	29	The Deepest Blue
1995	"Every Little Thing"	—	50	The Deepest Blue
1996	"All for the Love"	—	148	The Deepest Blue
"—" denotes a recording that did not chart or was not released in that territory.

== Awards and nominations ==
Year	Work	Award	Category	Result	Ref
1985	Margaret Urlich	New Zealand Music Awards	Female Vocalist of the Year	Won	
1986	Margaret Urlich	New Zealand Music Awards	Female Vocalist of the Year	Won	
1989	Margaret Urlich	New Zealand Music Awards	Female Vocalist of the Year	Won	
1989	Safety in Numbers	New Zealand Music Awards	Album of the Year	Won	
1989	Polly Walker and Debbie Watson for Safety in Numbers	New Zealand Music Awards	Album Cover of the Year	Won	
1989	"Escaping"	New Zealand Music Awards	Single of the Year	Won	
1990	Margaret Urlich	New Zealand Music Awards	Female Vocalist of the Year	Won	
1990	Margaret Urlich	New Zealand Music Awards	International Achievement	Nominated	
1990	"Number One (Remember When We Danced All Night)"	New Zealand Music Awards	Single of the Year	Nominated	
1991	Safety in Numbers	ARIA Music Awards	Breakthrough Artist – Album	Won	
1991	Safety in Numbers	ARIA Music Awards	Album of the Year	Nominated	
1991	Safety in Numbers	ARIA Music Awards	Best Female Artist	Nominated	
1992	Margaret Urlich	World Music Awards	Best-Selling New Zealand Artist of the Year	Won	
1993	Chameleon Dreams	ARIA Music Awards	Best Female Artist	Nominated	
1994	"Burnt Sienna"	ARIA Music Awards	Best Female Artist	Nominated	
1994	"Where is the Love?" (with Rick Price)	ARIA Music Awards	Best Adult Contemporary Album	Nominated	
2000	Kimberley Renwick for Second Nature	New Zealand Music Awards	Album Cover of the Year	Nominated	
2021	Margaret Urlich and When the Cat's Away	New Zealand Music Awards	New Zealand Music Hall of Fame	inductee	

== Television appearances ==
Year	Title	Performance	Type
1984	Shazam! Battle of the Bands	Herself (with Peking Man "Good Luck to You")	NZ series
1989	MTV	Singer (5 songs)	Concert series, 1 episode
1989; 1990	Countdown Revolution	Singer ("Escaping" / "Number One")	3 episodes
1989–1992	Aotearoa Music Awards	Singer	NZ TV special, 3 episodes
1989–1995	The Midday Show	Singer	6 episodes
1990	MTV in Concert	Singer ("Escaping")	TV special
1990–1993	Tonight Live with Steve Vizard	Singer	6 episodes
1990–1996	Hey Hey It's Saturday	Singer	12 episodes
1992	In Sydney Today	Singer ("Boy in the Moon" / "Human Race")	2 episodes
1992	Video Smash Hits	Singer ("Burnt Sienna")	1 episode
1992	World Music Awards	Singer ("Love Train")	TV special
1992; 2012	The Morning Show	Singer	2 episodes
1993	Australian Fashion Awards	Singer ("Fashion")	TV special
1993	Ernie and Denise	Singer ("Second Best")	1 episode
1993	Good Morning Australia	Singer ("Second Best")	3 episodes
1993	Ray Martin at Midday	Singer ("Second Best")	1 episode
1993	Live and Sweaty	Singer ("Boy in the Moon" / "Second Best")	1 episode
1994	Kate Ceberano and Friends	Singer ("I've Got You Under My Skin")	1 episode
1994	Full Frontal	Singer ("Somethin' Stupid" with Shaun Micallef)	1 episode
1994	1994 Rugby League Grand Final	Singer ("Advance Australia Fair")	TV special
1994	The Australia Remembers When Gala Tribute Concert	Singer ("Lilli Marlene")	TV special
1995	Ernie and Denise	Singer ("Every Little Thing")	1 episode
1995	Don't Forget Your Toothbrush	Singer ("Every Little Thing")	1 episode
1995	Today	Singer ("All By Myself")	1 episode
1995	Carols By Candlelight	Singer ("Song for the Unborn Child")	TV special
1996	Monday to Friday	Singer ("All for the Love")	1 episode
1996	Talking Telephone Numbers	Singer ("All for the Love")	1 episode
1996	Carols in the Domain	Singer ("God Bless the Child")	TV special
1998	Good Vibrations: The Concert for Marc Hunter	Singer ("Young Years", with Kevin Bennett and Sharon O'Neill)	TV special
1999	The Micallef Program	Singer ("You’re So Vain" with Shaun Micallef)	1 episode
2003	Mornings with Kerri-Anne	Singer ("Killing Me Softly with His Song")	1 episode
2012	The Morning Show	Singer ("Escaping" / "Boy in the Moon")	1 episode
