= Another Place (Rick Price album) =

Studio album by Rick Price
- Released: July 1999
- Genre: Rock
- Label: Epic Records
- Producer: Phil Buckle, Rick Price

Rick Price chronology
| Songs from the Heart (1996) | Another Place (1999) | A Million Miles (2003) |

Singles from Another Place
- 1. "Where in the World" Released: November 1998; 2. "Good as Gone" Released: June 1999

Another Place is the third studio album by Australian singer songwriter Rick Price. The album was released in July 1999 through Epic Records, a division of Sony Music Entertainment. It peaked at number 88 on the ARIA Charts in August 1999. Two singles were released from the album, "Where in the World" and "Good as Gone".

== Track listing ==
CD

1. "Where In The World" – 4:00
2. "Good As Gone" – 4:00
3. "Baby It's You" – 4:11
4. "Ghost of You and Me" – (recorded originally by Curtis Stigers) 4:39
5. "Love And Madness" – 4:30
6. "Heaven Every Step Of The Way" – 4:30
7. "Come On Come On" – 3:40
8. "Don't Do Me That Way" – 4:26
9. "Enough To Let You Go" – 4:36
10. "Don't Make Me Love You" – 4:38

== Charts ==
| Chart (1999) | Peak position |
|---|---|
| Australian Albums (ARIA) | 86 |
