= Rick Price =

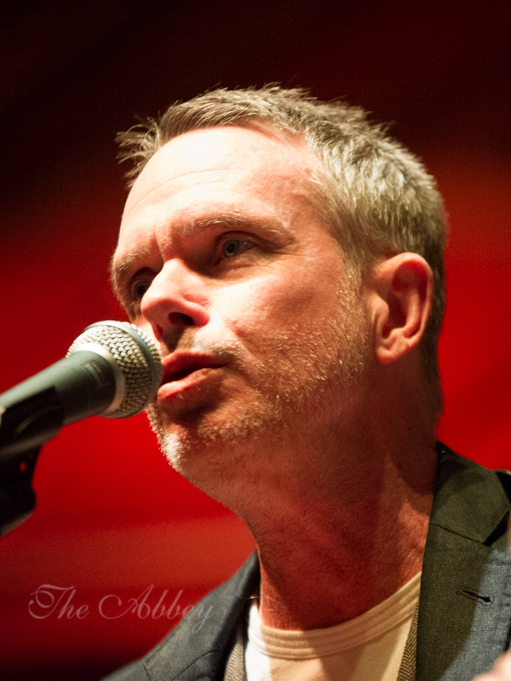
- Price performing in 2013

Background information
- Born: 6 July 1961 (age 65); Beaudesert, Queensland, Australia
- Genres: Pop; pop rock; soft rock; folk rock
- Occupations: Singer; songwriter; multi-instrumentalist; record producer; executive
- Instruments: Vocals; guitar; piano; drums; keyboards; harmonica; ukulele
- Years active: 1970–present
- Labels: Sony BMG; Clarice
- Website: www.rickprice.com

Rick Allan Price (born 6 July 1961) is an Australian singer, songwriter, multi-instrumentalist and record producer and executive founding his own label "Clarice Records".

His debut album, Heaven Knows, was released in July 1992, and peaked at No. 3 on the ARIA Albums Chart. It provided two top ten singles, "Not a Day Goes By" and the title track.

At the APRA Music Awards of 1992 "Heaven Knows" won Song of the Year for Price and his co-writer, Heather Field.

His second album in 1995 Tamborine Mountain contained the single "River of Love", which peaked at No. 18. Since 2009 he has been a resident of Nashville, Tennessee.

Price has worked with numerous artists as a vocalist, songwriter and record producer, including Tina Arena, Eric Clapton, Bryan Adams, Richie Sambora, U2, Bruce Springsteen, Tommy Emmanuel, Rod Stewart, Sting, Mitch Grainger, Regine Velasquez-Alcasid, John Mellencamp, Jon Bon Jovi and numerous others and recorded a duet album California Dreaming with Jack Jones. As a music producer, he has worked for Girlfriend and Dami Im.

== Early life ==
Roderick Allan Price was born on 6 July 1961 in Beaudesert, a small country town 69 kilometres (43 mi) south of Brisbane to Allan and Clarice Price. At the age of nine he appeared touring with his family band, "Union Beau", performing at local bush dances in southern Queensland and northern New South Wales. Price has cited Stevie Wonder, James Taylor and Carole King as his inspirations.

At the age of 18, Price moved to Sydney, where he worked as a session and touring musician, playing bass guitar with various inner city outfits. In September 1983 he was recorded on David Fennell's album Harbour Crossing, where he provided bass guitar and backing vocals. During the mid-1980s Price turned more towards his singing. His distinctive vocals were soon in demand – he was a backing vocalist for Marcia Hines, Jon English, Dragon, Kerrie Biddell and Jade Hurley. He joined the Tommy Emmanuel Band during 1988.

== Career ==
=== 1988–1990: Career beginnings ===
In 1988, he sang "Celebration of a Nation", with Keren Minshull (later a member of band Euphoria), the theme song for the Australian Bicentenary. Price later opined "That song made me realise I wanted a recording career of my own. I knew I needed a deal but it was also clear to me that before I did that, I had to write songs I was happy with." He also provided vocals on ""You're Not Alone" released in April 1988 by the Australian Olympians – an ensemble of various local artists – as a theme song for the national Summer Olympics campaign. It reached the top 30 on the ARIA Singles Chart. These opportunities helped lay the foundation for his solo career. Price began writing his own material in the late 1980s. He was recorded on the single, "Living Without Your Love", in 1990, which was written by Mike Perjanik. It was performed on TV teen soap opera, Home and Away, by a fictitious group, Image, with Price providing lead vocals.

=== 1991–1992: Heaven Knows ===
In 1991, Price signed a deal with Columbia Records and he travelled to Los Angeles to work with producer, Chris Lord-Alge (Elton John, Bruce Springsteen, Roxette). He issued his debut solo single, "Not a Day Goes By", in February 1992. It was co-written by Price with Pamela Reswick and Steve Werfel. The track was placed on high rotation on radio with the associated music video presented on national TV. It peaked at No. 5 and spent 13 weeks in the Top 40.

In June 1992, his second single, "Heaven Knows", was released. Price co-wrote that track with Heather Field. It reached No. 6. The song helped launch his international career. In May of that year, he joined the Wizard of Oz showcase in Los Angeles, where he performed alongside Tina Arena and other Australian artists. In July, Price released his debut album, Heaven Knows, entered the ARIA Albums Chart at No. 3 and stayed in the Top 40 chart for nine weeks – it returned to the Top 40 in May of the following year.

Australian musicologist Ian McFarlane described the album as "a well-crafted blend of radio-friendly Adult Oriented Rock (AOR), pop and soul material" where Price had used "hot US session players who had collectively worked with everyone from Michael Jackson and Madonna to Steve Winwood and Barbra Streisand." It had also been produced by Lord-Alge. Price explained to Nicole Leedham of The Canberra Times, "I could have made the album earlier but I didn't want to go ahead and sign the wrong deal, that can really destroy an artist's career. I also wanted to make sure that I was absolutely happy with every single track on the record." To promote the album, he formed the Rick Price Band with P. J. Becker on backing vocals, Mike Caen on guitar, Mitch Farmer on drums, Shauna Jensen on backing vocals, Peter Northcote on guitar and Victor Rounds on bass guitar.

In August, Heaven Knows was released in Europe and Asia, it reached the top 100 on the German Albums Chart in the following February. In September Price embarked on his first solo tour of Australia. He followed with a promotional trip to Europe including the United Kingdom. In October, he returned to Europe for further TV appearances and then a three-week promotional trip to Southeast Asia. By the end of the year, his group's line-up was P.J. Becker, Chris Becker on bass guitar, Phil Gildea on guitar, Robert Parde on keyboards and David Porter on drums.

In November 1992, Price returned to Australia where he, and his co-writer Field, won the Song of the Year category for "Heaven Knows" at the APRA Music Awards. In December 1992 Price was invited to Germany to perform on a variety show. He then made a 36-hour stopover in Manila where he made six TV appearances, two radio interviews and a handful of press.

"Heaven Knows" held the top spot in Malaysia for four consecutive weeks while "Not a Day Goes By" sat just behind it in the Top 5. In the Philippines, "Heaven Knows" sat at number 1 for all of November and December. During this time, the album sold over 250,000 units alone in Southeast Asia. Price went on to say, "It was an exhausting experience, but it was stimulating at the same time. It was all new to me, going to places I'd never been and doing stuff I'd never done, so I certainly didn't get tired of it."

=== 1993–1994: Touring and recognition ===
In January and February 1993, Price once again toured Australia to sold-out venues. In April, he was nominated for 3 ARIA Awards and on the night performed a tribute to Peter Allen with "Tenterfield Saddler". Later in May, he was asked to perform the song on Good Morning America who were in Australia for two weeks. The performance was aired to five million people. Later that month, Heaven Knows was re-released and included the bonus CD Rarities. Price spent a fortnight travelling the country and promoting the re-release performing in acoustic mode.

In July 1993, Heaven Knows was released in America and Canada. Back home, Price continued his touring, this time in the Northern Territory and northern Queensland area, which he had not previously performed in. The tour was extremely successful, with all shows being theatres and all sold out.

In October 1993, Price performed more concerts in Southeast Asia, which incorporated seven shows in nine days. They were all sell-outs. The Sentosa Music Festival in Singapore saw him perform in front of 15,000 people. Before returning to Australia, Price visited Korea for short promotional and concert tour.

Price once again joined the Wizard of Oz showcases in Japan, where the album was launched. Whilst in Japan, he won Song of the Year for "Walk Away Renee" and Album of the Year for Heaven Knows at the Australian Music Awards. On his return from Japan, Price was awarded the 1993 Australian Export Award for recognition of his international success. During the month, a new single "Where Is the Love", a duet with New Zealand musician Margaret Urlich, was released.

In December 1993, Price was invited to the Singapore Music Awards as a special guest. He picked up Song of the Year for "Heaven Knows", then came back home to Australia for more touring before being invited to perform on the numerous Carols by Candlelight shows around the country and performing "White Christmas". The year was topped off when Price was presented with an Advance Australia Foundation award (in recognition of making an outstanding contribution to the growth and enhancement of Australia and its people).

During 1994, Price spent the majority of time writing material for his anticipated follow-up album. From September to December, Price recorded his second album in Melbourne with a host of Australia's leading musicians.

=== 1995–1996: Tamborine Mountain ===
In April 1995, the single "River of Love" was released, the first from Price's album Tamborine Mountain, which was later released in July. Price said "It was quite difficult, because I knew it was going to be a different album to Heaven Knows. I made that album as pop as I could make it, I wanted to be certain of airplay and all those kind of things. After the first album was released, I went out and played a lot of acoustic gigs. My audience tripled and people really liked it, which surprised me because I thought it would be a bit too internal, a bit too self-conscious. But it worked, which gave me a lot of encouragement and the confidence to write more like that, just simple little stories. And that's the kind of music I've always been drawn to - people like James Taylor and Carole King, great songwriters who have the ability to say something really simple".

The album was produced by Price and American Ben Wisch, who Price was drawn to as a result of his production of Marc Cohn's "Walking in Memphis". Special guests on the album include Tommy Emmanuel on guitar and Tina Arena on backing vocals, and the duet "Trust Me This Is Love".

After the success of the first single, "River of Love", a second single "Bridge Building Man" was released. The song was written for his father and grandfather. The album title itself refers to a small town near Beaudesert where Price grew up.

In November and December 1995, following the album release, Price then toured with Australian guitarist Tommy Emmanuel. The tour, Rick Price & Tommy Emmanuel - Together & Alone, was a sell-out. In conjunction with the tour, a third single, "To Be with You" was released in Australia. Price performed at several Carols by Candlelight shows around the country and continued to tour during early 1996. "You're Never Alone", a song Price wrote for his son, was released in Australia while he travelled the country on further promotional tours throughout the year.

=== 1997–2003: Another Place and A Million Miles ===
In January and February 1997, Price played several shows alongside another accomplished Australian singer/songwriter, Jack Jones. The shows were a success with the pair performing their best hits together and alone, proving yet again their abilities as live performers.

For the majority of the year, Price spent his time in Los Angeles and Nashville writing material for his next album.

Some of the collaborators Price has worked with included Steve Werfel and Pam Reswick on "Not a Day Goes By" (who has written songs such as "Chains" by Tina Arena), Jon Lind (who has written songs such as "Simple Life" by John Farnham, and "Crazy for You" by Madonna), and Randy Goodrum, a well-respected writer from Nashville. He has also written with Australia's Heather Field, who co-wrote "Heaven Knows" and "River of Love", and once again has worked with Phil Buckle, who co-wrote "What's Wrong With That Girl" from Rick's Heaven Knows album.

In November and December 1997, Price played a couple of showcases to the public with some of the new material he had been working on. During the later months of 1997 and early 1998, Price recorded his new album in Los Angeles. The album Another Place was released in Australia in July 1999, spanning singles including "Where in the World" and "Good As Gone". In 2003, parting with Sony, Price released another solo album, A Million Miles, on his own label Clarice. Described as a garage album and going back to his musical roots, he plays every instrument heard on the album.

=== 2004–2010: 2UP, Revisited and John Denver tour ===
Starting from around 2004 Price spent much of his time writing with and recording and producing for other artists such as Melinda Schneider, Tamara Stewart, Lisa Chappell and David Franj. In 2004, The Best of Rick Price CD and DVD was released, containing all of Price's bigger hits.

In 2007 Price recorded an album with Mitch Grainger called 2UP, featuring acoustic-style covers of such artists as Chris Isaac, and was featured in the soundtrack to the film December Boys.

In 2008, Revisited, an album of his greatest hits recorded in an "intimate acoustic style", was released. He toured Tasmania with the band Invisible Boy at the year's conclusion.

In 2009, after having relocated to Nashville, Price toured the US with Australian guitar virtuoso Tommy Emmanuel before returning to Australia and touring in a legacy show to singer-songwriter John Denver, with "The John Denver Story".

=== 2011–2016: The Waters Edge and Tennessee Sky ===
An album titled The Water's Edge was released in 2011, featuring the singles "Shape of My Heart" and "I'm Coming Home". It also includes a cover of the Joni Mitchell hit "River".

In April 2015, the album Tennessee Sky was released exclusively through the PledgeMusic campaign, where fans could have input into the production of the album, it was preceded by the first single "Work That Fire". The album has been described as an earthy gospel album. Tennessee Sky features an acoustic reworking of the Leonard Cohen hit "Hallelujah". The album peaked at number 97 in Australia and number 19 on the Australian indie chart. Price toured the album throughout Victoria Australia in July 2015 The accompanying tour "Can I Get a Witness", was launched on the back of the Tennessee Sky album release with dates throughout May and June 2016.

=== 2017–2020: California Dreaming (with Jack Jones) and Heaven Knows tour ===
In September 2017, Price released California Dreaming, a collaboration with Australian singer-songwriter Jack Jones. The album became Price's second top ten album. Price produced Dami Im's 2018 album I Hear a Song.

In May 2018, it was announced Price will tour his album Heaven Knows in October and November from cover to cover.

In October 2019, Price released a re-recorded version of "Nothing Can Stop Us Now" from Tambourine Mountain with Regine Velasquez-Alcasid.

At the global APRA Awards in March 2020, Price was awarded the Overseas Recognition Award.

=== 2021-present: Soulville & Wayfaring Stranger ===
In June 2021, Price announced the release of his forthcoming album and tour, Soulville, featuring songs from the 1960s. The one original track "Farewell But Not Goodbye", a tribute to Aretha Franklin was released on 18 June 2021 as the album's lead single, and is the only original track on the album

Price announced the forthcoming release of Wayfaring Stranger, described as a gospel album of cover songs, with hymns that span centuries and more recent tunes from the early 20th century. EP release coincided with a tour.

In 2024, Price announced the forthcoming release of album Hometown, proceeded by the singles "You Can't Keep a Good Man Down" and "Let It Go". The album is described as having country and rhythm and blues influence's whilst attaining traditional pop elements.

== Discography ==
=== Studio albums ===
List of albums
Title	Details	Peak chart positions		Certifications
Title	Details	AUS	GER	Certifications
Heaven Knows	Released: July 1992; Label: Columbia; Format: CD, cassette	3	96	ARIA: Platinum
Tamborine Mountain	Released: July 1995; Label: Columbia; Format: CD, cassette	11	—	
Another Place	Released: July 1999; Label: Epic; Format: CD, cassette	86	—	
A Million Miles	Released: 2003; Format: CD, cassette	—	—	
2 Up (with Mitch Grainger)	Released: 2007; Label: Clarise; Format: CD, digital download	—	—	
Revisited	Released: July 2008; Label: Clarise; Format: CD, digital download	—	—	
The Water's Edge	Released: 18 September 2011; Label: Clarise; Format: CD, digital download	—	—	
Tennessee Sky	Released: 25 April 2015; Label: Clarise; Format: CD, digital download	97	—	
California Dreaming (with Jack Jones)	Released: 29 September 2017; Label: Sony Music Australia; Format: CD, digital download	7	—	
Soulville	Released: 6 August 2021; Label: Sony Music Australia; Format: CD, digital download, streaming	123	—	
Hometown	Scheduled: 2025; Label: Clarise; Format: CD, digital download	TBA		
"—" denotes releases that did not chart or were not released in that country.

=== Compilation albums ===
List of compilation albums
Title	Album details
Songs from the Heart	Released: 1996; Label: Columbia; Format: CD/Cassette
The Best of Rick Price	Released: 2004; Label: Sony BMG; Format: CD/Cassette
The Essential Rick Price	Released: 5 November 2010; Label: Sony BMG Australia; Format: CD/Download

=== Extended plays ===
List of EPs
Title	Album details
Wayfaring Stranger	Released: November 2023; Label: Strange Loop Records; Format: digital

=== Singles ===
List of singles
Year	Title	Peak chart positions		Certification	Album
Year	Title	AUS	GER	Certification	Album
1992	"Not a Day Goes By"	5	73	ARIA: Gold	Heaven Knows
1992	"Heaven Knows"	6	—	ARIA: Gold	Heaven Knows
1992	"What's Wrong with That Girl"	45	—		Heaven Knows
1992	"Walk Away Renée"	21	52		Heaven Knows
1993	"A House Divided"	74	—		Heaven Knows
1993	"Where Is the Love" (Rick Price & Margaret Urlich)	31	—		non-album single
1995	"River of Love"	18	—		Tamborine Mountain
1995	"Bridge Building Man"	72	—		Tamborine Mountain
1996	"To Be with You"	68	—		Tamborine Mountain
1996	"You're Never Alone"	64	—		Tamborine Mountain
1998	"Where in the World"	130	—		Another Place
1999	"Good as Gone"	201	—		Another Place
2011	"Shape of My Heart"	—	—		The Water's Edge
2012	"I'm Coming Home"	—	—		The Water's Edge
2015	"Work That Fire"	—	—		Tennessee Sky
2016	"You're Not Alone"	—	—		Tennessee Sky
2017	"California Dreamin'" (with Jack Jones)	—	—		California Dreamin'
2019	"Nothing Can Stop Us Now" (with Regine Velasquez-Alcasid)	—	—		non-album singles
2020	"Heaven Knows" (with Morissette)	—	—		non-album singles
2021	"Farewell But Not Goodbye"	—	—		Soulville
2024	"You Can't Keep a Good Man Down"	—	—		TBA
2025	"Let It Go"	—	—		TBA
2025	"Secret Heart" (with Issi)	—	—		TBA
2026	"When" (with Issi)	—	—		TBA
2026	"Hometown"	—	—		TBA
2026	"Rainbows" (with Issi)	—	—		TBA
2026	"Call On Me"	—	—		TBA
"—" denotes releases that did not chart or were not released.

=== Other singles ===
List of singles as featured artist
Year	Title	Peak chart positions
Year	Title	AUS
1988	"You're Not Alone" (as Australian Olympians)	18
1990	"Living Without Your Love" (as Image featuring Rick Price)	—

== Awards and nominations ==
=== APRA Awards ===
The APRA Awards are held in Australia and New Zealand by the Australasian Performing Right Association to recognise songwriting skills, sales and airplay performance by its members annually.

Year	Nominee / work	Award	Result
1992	"Heaven Knows"	APRA Song of the Year	Won
1995	"River of Love"	APRA Song of the Year	Nominated
2002	"Angel" by Gina Jeffreys (Jeffreys and Price)	Most Performed Country Work	Won
2020	Rick Price	Global APRA Music Award	awarded

=== ARIA Music Awards ===
The ARIA Music Awards is an annual awards ceremony that recognises excellence, innovation, and achievement across all genres of Australian music.

Year	Nominee / work	Award	Result
1993	"Not a Day Goes By"	Breakthrough Artist – Single	Nominated
1993	"Not a Day Goes By"	Best New Talent	Nominated
1993	Heaven Knows	Breakthrough Artist – Album	Nominated
1994	"Where Is the Love?"	Best Adult Contemporary Album	Nominated
1995	"River of Love"	Best Male Artist	Nominated

=== Tamworth Songwriters Awards ===
The Tamworth Songwriters Association (TSA) is an annual songwriting contest for original country songs, awarded in January at the Tamworth Country Music Festival. They commenced in 1986.

Year	Nominee / work	Award	Result (wins only)
2002	"Too Strong to Break" by Beccy Cole, Rod McCormack and Rick Price	Contemporary Song of the Year	Won
