= A House Divided (song) =

Single by Rick Price

from the album Heaven Knows
- A-side: "A House Divided"
- Released: February 1993
- Recorded: 1991/1992
- Genre: Pop
- Length: 4:22
- Label: Columbia Records, Epic Records
- Songwriter(s): Pam Reswick, Rick Price, Steve Werdel
- Producer(s): Chris Lord-Alge

Rick Price singles chronology
"What's Wrong With That Girl" (1992)	"A House Divided" (1993)	"Walk Away Renée" (1993)

"A House Divided" is a song by Australian singer songwriter Rick Price. It was released as the fourth single from his debut studio album Heaven Knows in February 1993. The song peaked at No. 74 in Australia.

== Track listing ==
CD single

1. "House Divided"
2. "Where Are You Now?"
3. "If You Were My Baby"

== Charts ==
Chart performance for "A House Divided"
Chart (1993)	Peak position
Australia (ARIA)	74
