= Heaven Knows (Rick Price song) =

Single by Rick Price

from the album Heaven Knows
- B-side: "Listen to Your Heart"
- Released: July 1992
- Recorded: 1991
- Genre: Pop
- Length: 4:25
- Label: Columbia Records; Epic Records
- Songwriter(s): Harold Field; Rick Price
- Producer(s): Chris Lord-Alge

Rick Price singles chronology
"Not a Day Goes by" (1992)	"Heaven Knows" (1992)	"What's Wrong with That Girl" (1992)

Music video
- "Heaven Knows" on YouTube

"Heaven Knows" is a song by Australian singer-songwriter Rick Price. The title track of his debut studio album, it was released in July 1992 as the second single from the album, and peaked at No. 6 on the ARIA chart. It was certified gold. The song is also popular in Asia, particularly in the Philippines and Singapore.

At the APRA Music Awards of 1992, "Heaven Knows" won the award for 'song of the year'.

In February 2020, Price released a version of "Heaven Knows" as a duet with Filipino singer Morissette.

== Track listing ==
CD single

1. "Heaven Knows" – 4:25
2. "Listen to Your Heart" – 3:48

CD maxi

1. "Heaven Knows" – 4:25
2. "Listen to Your Heart" – 3:48
3. "Not a Day Goes By" (live acoustic version) – 3:32

== Charts and accreditation ==
=== Weekly charts ===
Chart (1992)	Peak position
Australia (ARIA)	6

=== Year-end charts ===
Chart (1992)	Position
Australian Singles Chart	43
Australian Artist Singles Chart	13

=== Certifications ===
Region	Certification	Certified units/sales
Australia (ARIA)	Gold	35,000^{^}
^{^} Shipments figures based on certification alone.
