= Tamborine Mountain (album) =

Studio album by Rick Price
- Released: July 1995
- Genre: Pop, pop rock
- Label: Sony Music-Columbia
- Producer: Ben Wisch

Rick Price chronology
Heaven Knows (1992)	Tamborine Mountain (1995)	Songs from the Heart (1996)

Singles from Tamborine Mountain
- 1. "River of Love" Released: May 1995; 2. "Bridge Mountain" Released: September 1995; 3. "To Be with You" Released: November 1995; 4. "You're Never Alone" Released: June 1996; 5. "You're Never Alone" Released: November 1997 (PH Released)

Tamborine Mountain is the second studio album by Australian singer-songwriter Rick Price. The album was released in July 1995 through Columbia Records. It peaked at number 11 on the ARIA Charts in August 1995. Four singles were released from the album, with the most successful being "River of Love". The album like its predecessor features a duet with Australian singer Tina Arena. The album is based on the rural town of Mount Tamborine, where Price grew up in Queensland.

== Track listing ==
CD

1. "To Be with You"
2. "River of Love"
3. "I Wanna Mean Something to You"
4. "You're Never Alone"
5. "Bridge Building Man"
6. "Strangers"
7. "Since I Met You"
8. "Foolish Heart"
9. "Trust Me This Is Love" (with Tina Arena)
10. "Sure Close to Lonely Tonight"
11. "Love Never Dies"
12. "You're Never Alone" (single version)
13. "Nothing Can Stop Us Now"

== Charts ==
Chart performance for Tamborine Mountain
Chart (1995)	Peak position
Australian Albums (ARIA)	11
