= Escaping (song) =

1989 single by Margaret Urlich

Single by Margaret Urlich

from the album Safety in Numbers
- B-side: "God Bless the Child"
- Released: September 1989
- Studio: 301 (Sydney, Australia)
- Genre: Pop
- Length: 4:36
- Label: CBS
- Songwriters: Barry Blue; Robyn Smith
- Producer: Robyn Smith

Margaret Urlich singles chronology
"Escaping" (1989)	"Number One (Remember When We Danced All Night)" (1990)

"Escaping" is a song by New Zealand singer Margaret Urlich. It is written by Barry Blue and Robyn Smith, and produced by Smith. It was released as her debut solo single in September 1989 by CBS Records International and charted at number one for three weeks in the New Zealand singles chart, later reaching number 17 in Australia. It is the opening track on Urlich's debut album, Safety in Numbers (1989), and also features on her 1994 live album Live.

== Awards ==
At the 1989 New Zealand Music Awards, "Escaping" won Single of the Year. At the same awards, Urlich won Best Female Vocalist, and her debut album Safety in Numbers won Album of the Year and Best Cover Design.

== Track listings ==
- 7-inch single
1. "Escaping" – 4:36
2. "God Bless This Child" – 3:55
- 12-inch and CD single
1. "Escaping" – 4:36
2. "Your Love" – 4:30
3. "God Bless This Child" – 3:55

== Charts ==
=== Weekly charts ===
Chart (1989–1990)	Peak position
Australia (ARIA)	17
New Zealand (Recorded Music NZ)	1

Chart (2022)	Peak position
Australia Digital Tracks (ARIA)	5
New Zealand Hot Singles (RMNZ)	10

=== Year-end charts ===
Chart (1989)	Position
New Zealand (RIANZ)	46

Chart (1990)	Position
Australia (ARIA)	79

== Asia Blue version ==
"Escaping"

Single by Asia Blue

from the album Escaping
- Released: 1992
- Genre: Pop
- Length: 4:46
- Label: A&M
- Songwriters: Barry Blue; Robyn Smith
- Producer: Barry Blue

Asia Blue singles chronology
"Escaping" (1992)	"Connect" (1992)

British female soul trio Asia Blue released a cover of the song as their debut single in 1992 by A&M Records. Their version was produced by Barry Blue, who had originally written the song. The single peaked at number 50 in the UK in June 1992, becoming the group's biggest hit. The trio released two more singles, "Connect" and "Boy in the Moon" (another song originally done by Margaret Urlich) in 1992 and 1993 respectively, which failed to chart inside the UK top 75. A 10-track album titled Escaping was recorded and set to be released in early 1993, but due to the singles' lack of success it was shelved by the label.

=== Critical reception ===
Pan-European magazine Music & Media wrote in their review that "this female vocal trio excels with a soulful ballad including a virtually classic chorus reminiscent of Donna Summer's 'State of Independence'." Miranda Sawyer from Select noted its "gloriously syrupy chorus that would do Quincy Jones proud. 'Escaping' slicks and smooches in creditable En Vogue style."

=== Track listings ===
- 7-inch single
1. "Escaping" (Cool Blue Mix) – 4:46
2. "I Want the Right (To Be Wrong)" – 4:07
- 12-inch single
1. "Escaping" (A Kiss Across The Sea Mix) – 6:07
2. "Escaping" (Sleeping Giant Mix) – 5:32
3. "I Want the Right (To Be Wrong)" – 4:07
- CD single
1. "Escaping" (Cool Blue Mix) – 4:46
2. "Escaping" (A Kiss Across The Sea Mix) – 6:07
3. "Escaping" (Sleeping Giant Mix) – 5:32
4. "I Want the Right (To Be Wrong)" – 4:07

=== Charts ===
Chart (1992)	Peak position
UK Singles (OCC)	50
UK Airplay (Music Week)	26
UK Club Chart (Music Week)	77

== Dina Carroll version ==
"Escaping"

Single by Dina Carroll

from the album Only Human
- B-side: "Mind Body & Soul"
- Released: 16 September 1996
- Genre: Gospel
- Length: 3:41
- Label: Mercury; 1st Avenue
- Songwriters: Barry Blue; Robyn Smith; Dina Carroll; Nigel Lowis
- Producer: Nigel Lowis

Dina Carroll singles chronology
"The Perfect Year" (1993)	"Escaping" (1996)	"Only Human" (1996)

Music video
- "Escaping" on YouTube

British singer Dina Carroll released a cover of the song on 16 September 1996 by Mercury and 1st Avenue. For her version, Carroll and producer Nigel Lowis rewrote a good part of the original lyrics, but maintained the same musical structure of the previous versions. The video clip heavily featured a documentary of Balinese people culture and social life.

Her first single after a three-year absence, "Escaping" became Carroll's highest-charting hit in the UK, peaking at No. 3, equalling the position of her ballad "Don't Be a Stranger". The B-side, "Mind Body & Soul", was released as a single in Japan on 25 December 1996.

=== Critical reception ===
Jon O'Brien from AllMusic described "Escaping" as a "joint, worldbeat-inspired" song. Irish Evening Herald stated that Carroll "certainly knows how to make a comeback in style". Ross Jones from The Guardian complimented its chorus as "massive" and noted how the "life-affirming refrain sweeps up to the heavens". Pan-European magazine Music & Media wrote, "...Dina Caroll is already receiving airplay with this cover version of the Asia Blue song. Don't expect R&B: this is a well-produced velvety gospel ballad." A reviewer from Music Week rated it three out of five, declaring it "an atmospheric, lushly-arranged ballad, complete with an African feel and touches of Estefan." Another Music Week editor, Alan Jones, noted that this "strong mid-tempo cut with a soaring chorus" is already a radio favourite, "which should give her a triumphant return to the upper echelons of the chart."

=== Track listings ===
- UK and Japanese CD single
1. "Escaping"
2. "Escaping" (DARC by Nature remix)
3. "Mind Body & Soul" (Chicago MVP's Allstar mix)
4. "Mind Body & Soul" (Jere McAllister Final's remix)
- UK 12-inch single

A1. "Mind Body & Soul" (Chicago MVP's Allstar mix)
A2. "Mind Body & Soul" (Bounce Productions Storm dub)
B1. "Mind Body & Soul" (Sci-Fi Learners Vox mix)
B2. "Escaping" (radio edit)

- UK cassette single and European CD single
1. "Escaping" (radio edit)
2. "Escaping" (DARC by Nature remix)
- Japanese mini-CD single ("Mind, Body & Soul")
1. "Mind Body & Soul" (album version)
2. "Mind Body & Soul" (Chicago MVP's Allstar mix)

=== Charts ===
==== Weekly charts ====
Chart (1996)	Peak position
Europe (Eurochart Hot 100)	21
Iceland (Íslenski Listinn Topp 40)	37
Ireland (IRMA)	14
Israel (Israeli Singles Chart)	7
Scottish Singles Sales (Official Charts)	5
UK Singles (Official Charts)	3
UK Dance (Official Charts)	8
UK Airplay (Music Week)	2

==== Year-end charts ====
Chart (1996)	Position
UK Singles (OCC)	71
UK Airplay (Music Week)	43

=== Release history ===
Region	Date	Format(s)	Label(s)	Ref.
United Kingdom	16 September 1996	12-inch vinyl; CD; cassette	Mercury; 1st Avenue	
Japan	25 October 1996	CD	Mercury	
