= The Essential John Farnham =

Greatest hits album by John Farnham
- Released: 21 August 2009 (Australia)
- Recorded: 1968–2005
- Genres: Synthpop, pop, rock
- Length: 2:46:08
- Label: Sony Music
- Producers: Ross Fraser, John Farnham

John Farnham chronology
Essential (2009)	The Essential John Farnham (2009)	Jack (2010)

The Essential John Farnham (also referred to as The Essential 3.0) is a compilation album by John Farnham, released as a 3-CD set on 21 August 2009, as a part of "The Essential" series. This compilation was released to promote the "John Farnham – Live by Demand" tour.

== Reception ==
Professional ratings
Review scores
Source	Rating
AllMusic	3.5/5 stars

James Monger from All Music "This mammoth three-disc collection from celebrated English-born Australian pop singer John Farnham features nearly five decades of hits, from his teen pop idol days through his late-'80s/early-'90s peak and on through his charity-driven later years."

== Track listing ==
Disc 1

1. "You're the Voice" (M. Ryder, C. Thompson, A. Qunta, K. Reid) – 5:02
2. "Chain Reaction" (D. Stewart, S. Stewart) – 3:12
3. "Seemed Like a Good Idea (At the Time)" (R. Wilson, J. Farnham, R. Fraser) – 4:17
4. "Age of Reason" (T. Hunter, J. Pigott) – 5:06
5. "I Remember When I Was Young" (M. Taylor) – 4:31
6. "One" (H. Nilsson) – 2:50
7. "Talk of the Town" (S. Howard) – 3:42
8. "Hearts on Fire" (T. Kimmel, S. Lynch) – 4:48
9. "Trying to Live My Life Without You" (E. Williams) – 3:26
10. "See the Banners Fall" (J. Farnham, D. Hirschfelder, R. Fraser) – 4:35
11. "Two Strong Hearts" (B. Woolley, A. Hill) – 3:31
12. "No Ordinary World" (L. Andersson, S. Davis) – 3:49
13. "Going, Going, Gone" (J. Farnham, D. Hirschfelder, R. Fraser) – 3:34
14. "All Kinds of People" (E. Pressley, S. Crow, K. Gilbert) – 5:16

Disc 2

1. "That's Freedom" (T. Kimmel, J. Chapman) – 4:18
2. "Pressure Down" (H. Bogdanovs) – 3:44
3. "When Something Is Wrong with My Baby" (J. Hayes, D. Porter) – 4:56
4. "Romeo's Heart" (J. Kimball, R. Vanwarmer) – 4:19
5. "A Touch of Paradise" (R. Wilson, G. Smith) – 4:46
6. "Angels" (T. Kimmel, J. Kimball) – 5:38
7. "In Days to Come" (J. Farnham, D. Hirschfelder, R. Fraser) – 4:05
8. "Everytime You Cry" (S. Peiken, G. Sutton) – 4:45
9. "Come Said the Boy" (E. McCusker) – 4:32
10. "Please Don't Ask Me" (G. Goble) – 3:19
11. "Beyond the Call" (D. Batteau, D. Brown, K. Dukes) – 4:41
12. "Comic Conversations" (J. Bromley) – 3:19
13. "A Simple Life" (J. Lind, R. Page) – 3:53
14. "Listen to the Wind" (B. Thomas, J. Stevens) – 4:24

Disc 3

1. "Have a Little Faith (In Us)" (R. Desalvo, A. Roman) – 5:06
2. "Don't You Know It's Magic" (B. Cadd) – 4:01
3. "Man of the Hour" (S. Hostin, D. Deviller, S. Kipner) – 4:05
4. "Everything's Alright" (Andrew Lloyd Webber, Tim Rice) – 4:48
5. "Burn for You" (P. Buckle, J. Farnham, R. Faser) – 3:33
6. "Reasons" (S. See) – 4:27
7. "Talent for Fame" (J. Farnham, R. Fraser, R. Marx) – 4:36
8. "We're No Angels" (R. Wilson) – 4:50
9. "Love to Shine" (H. Bogdanovs, K.Dee) – 4:02
10. "Friday Kind of Monday" (J. Barry, E. Greenwich) – 2:44
11. "Raindrops Keep Fallin' on My Head" (B. Bacharach, H. David) – 2:32
12. "The Last Time" (Mick Jagger, K. Richards) – 3:27

== Charts ==
=== Weekly charts ===
Chart (2009)	Peak position
Australian Albums (ARIA)	6

=== Year-end charts ===
Chart (2009)	Position
Australian Albums (ARIA)	95

== Certifications ==
Region	Certification	Certified units/sales
Australia (ARIA)	Gold	35,000^{^}
^{^} Shipments figures based on certification alone.
