= Every Little Thing (Margaret Ulrich song) =

Single by Margaret Urlich

from the album The Deepest Blue
- B-side: "Fly With You"
- Released: 7 August 1995
- Genre: Pop
- Length: 3:15
- Label: Columbia
- Songwriter(s): Robyn Smith, Margaret Urlich
- Producer(s): Robyn Smith

Margaret Urlich singles chronology
"Gonna Make You Mine" (1995)	"Every Little Thing" (1995)	"All for the Love" (1995)

"Every Little Thing" is a song from New Zealand singer Margaret Urlich. The song was released in August 1995 as the second single from her third studio album, The Deepest Blue. The song peaked at number 50 in Australia.

== Track listing ==
CD single

1. "Every Little Thing" – 3:15
2. "Fly with You"

== Charts ==
Chart performance for "Every Little Thing"
Chart (1995)	Peak position
Australia (ARIA)	50
