= Number One (Remember When We Danced All Night) =

Single by Margaret Urlich

from the album Safety in Numbers
- B-side: "Room That Echoes"
- Released: February 1990 (New Zealand); 17 September 1990 (Australia)
- Recorded: 1989
- Studio: 301 Studios (Sydney)
- Genre: Pop, synth pop
- Length: 4:10
- Label: CBS
- Songwriters: David Tyson, Dean McTaggart
- Producer: Robyn Smith

Margaret Urlich singles chronology
"Escaping" (1989)	"Number One (Remember When We Danced All Night)" (1990)	"Only My Heart Calling" (1991)

"Number One (Remember When We Danced All Night)" is a song by New Zealand singer Margaret Urlich. The song was released in February 1990 in New Zealand as the second single from her debut studio album, Safety in Numbers, and in September 1990 as the third single from the album in Australia. The song features on her 1994 live album Live.

== Track listing ==
CD single/7" (CBS 654981-7)

1. "Number One (Remember When We Danced All Night)" – 4:10
2. "Room That Echoes" – 3:10

12" single

1. "Number One (Remember When We Danced All Night)" (extended mix) – 7:13
2. "Number One (Remember When We Danced All Night)" – 4:10
3. "Room That Echoes" – 3:10

== Charts ==
Chart performance for "Number One (Remember When We Danced All Night)"
Chart (1990)	Peak position
Australia (ARIA)	24
New Zealand (Recorded Music NZ)	10

2022 chart performance for "Number One (Remember When We Danced All Night)"
Chart (2022)	Peak position
Australia Digital Tracks (ARIA)	15
New Zealand Hot Singles (RMNZ)	39
