= The Essential (John Farnham album) =

Compilation album by John Farnham
- Released: 31 January 2009
- Genre: Rock
- Length: 35:47
- Label: EMI

John Farnham chronology
I Remember When I Was Young (2005)	The Essential (2009)	The Essential John Farnham (2009)

The Essential is a compilation album of early material by the Australian singer John Farnham. It was released in January 2009.

== Track listing ==
CD (2426622)

1. "Sadie (The Cleaning Lady)" - 3:19
2. "Underneath the Arches" - 2:01
3. "Friday Kind of Monday" - 2:45
4. "Raindrops Keep Fallin' on My Head" - 2:32
5. "One" - 2:50
6. "Jamie" - 2:28
7. "Comic Conversation" - 3:18
8. "Rock Me Baby" - 3:20
9. "Everything is out of Season" - 3:15
10. "Down on the Border" (Little River Band) - 2:58
11. "Don't You Know It's Magic" - 4:02
12. "Playing to Win" (Little River Band) - 2:59
