= Burnt Sienna (song) =

Single by Margaret Urlich

from the album Chameleon Dreams
- B-side: "Guilty People" (live)
- Released: 24 May 1993
- Genre: Pop
- Length: 5:47
- Label: Columbia
- Songwriter(s): Margaret Urlich; Robyn Smith
- Producer(s): T Swain

Margaret Urlich singles chronology
"Human Race" (1992)	"Burnt Sienna" (1993)	"Where is the Love" (1993)

"Burnt Sienna" is a song from New Zealand singer Margaret Urlich. The song was released in May 1993 as the fourth and final single from her second studio album, Chameleon Dreams. The song peaked at number 33 on the Australian singles chart.

At the ARIA Music Awards of 1994. Urlich was nominated for Best Female Artist for "Burnt Sienna", but lost to "Friday's Child" by Wendy Matthews.

== Track listing ==
CD single/7" (Columbia 659003.1)

1. "Burnt Sienna"
2. "Guilty People" (live)
3. "Burnt Sienna" (live)

== Charts ==
Chart performance for "Burnt Sienna"
Chart (1993)	Peak position
Australia (ARIA)	33
