= Where Is the Love (Roberta Flack and Donny Hathaway song) =

1972 single by Roberta Flack and Donny Hathaway

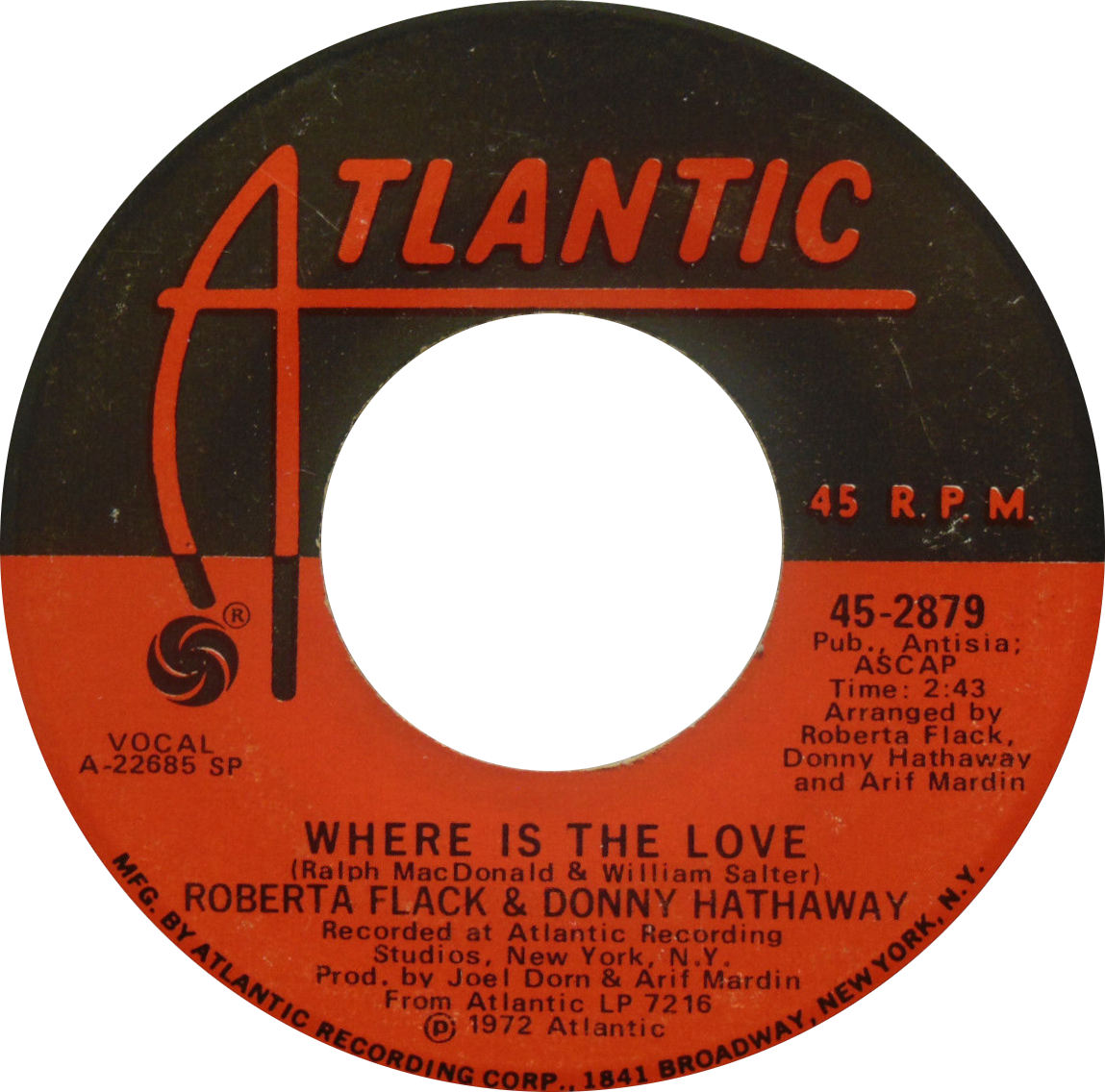
- One of side-A labels of the US single

Single by Roberta Flack and Donny Hathaway

from the album Roberta Flack & Donny Hathaway
- B-side: "Mood"
- Released: June 1972
- Genre: Soul; easy listening
- Length: 2:43
- Label: Atlantic
- Songwriters: Ralph MacDonald; William Salter
- Producers: Joel Dorn; Arif Mardin

Roberta Flack singles chronology
"The First Time Ever I Saw Your Face" (1972)	"Where Is the Love" (1972)	"Killing Me Softly with His Song" (1973)

Donny Hathaway singles chronology
"I Thank You" (1972)	"Where Is the Love" (1972)	"I Love You More Than You'll Ever Know" (1972)

Official audio
- "Where Is the Love on YouTube

"Where Is the Love" is a popular song written by Ralph MacDonald and William Salter, and recorded by Roberta Flack and Donny Hathaway. Released in 1972 from their album, Roberta Flack & Donny Hathaway. It peaked at number five on the Billboard Hot 100 singles chart and spent a week each at number one on the Billboard Easy Listening chart (July 1972) and R&B chart (August 1972). Billboard ranked it as the No. 58 song for 1972. The song won a Grammy Award for Best Pop Performance by a Duo or Group with Vocals.

In the lyrics, the singer realizes that the one (s)he loves remains in love with someone else. The singer remarks "I guess it must have been my fate to fall in love with someone else's love. Now all I can do is wait."

== Chart performance ==
=== Weekly charts ===
Chart (1972)	Peak position
Australia (Kent Music Report)	55
Canada	35
UK	29
U.S. Billboard Hot 100	5
U.S. Billboard Best Selling Soul Singles	1
U.S. Billboard Easy Listening	1
U.S. Cash Box Top 100	7

Chart (2025)	Peak position
US R&B/Hip-Hop Digital Song Sales (Billboard)	8

=== Year-end charts ===
Chart (1972)	Rank
U.S. Billboard Hot 100	58
U.S. Cash Box	78

== Cover versions ==
There have been numerous cover versions of this song:

- The Ray Conniff Singers recorded a version in 1972 for their album Alone Again (Naturally).
- Helen Reddy recorded a version in 1972 for her Capitol album I Am Woman.
- Both Jerry Vale and Andy Williams released versions in 1972, each on different albums named Alone Again (Naturally).
- Sérgio Mendes & Brasil '77 had a top 20 easy listening hit with their 1973 cover version.
- Liza Minnelli covered it on her 1973 album The Singer.
- Eurovision Song Contest winner Dana recorded a version in the mid-1970s.
- Jazz musician Woody Herman recorded an Alan Broadbent arrangement for his album Children of Lima that featured a bassoon solo by Frank Tiberi.
- Australian rock band The Reels included a version on their 1982 released album Beautiful.
- Stephanie Mills and Robert Brookins recorded a version that peaked at number 18 on the R&B Songs chart in 1988.
- Guitarist Zachary Breaux recorded an instrumental version for his album Groovin' in 1992.
- Australian singer Rick Price and New Zealand singer Margaret Urlich had a hit on the Australian charts with the song in 1993.
- In 1995, Jesse & Trina covered the song for the soundtrack to the film Dead Presidents, and this version reached number 40 on the R&B chart.
- In 1996, Paul Jackson Jr covered the song on the album Never Alone Duets.
- Amel Larrieux and Glenn Lewis were featured on a version on Stanley Clarke's 12 To the bass, which was nominated for Best R&B Performance by a Duo or Group with Vocals at the 2004 Grammy Awards.
- Dutch singer Trijntje Oosterhuis and American singer Raul Midon recorded a version for Midon's album State of Mind in 2006.
- American pop singer Johnny Mathis covered the song on his 2008 album, A Night to Remember.

== Mica Paris and Will Downing version ==
"Where Is the Love"

Single by Mica Paris and Will Downing

from the album So Good
- Released: 1988
- Genre: Soul
- Length: 3:33
- Label: 4th & Broadway
- Songwriters: Ralph MacDonald; William Salter

Mica Paris singles chronology
"Breathe Life into Me" (1988)	"Where Is the Love" (1989)	"Contribution" (1990)

Music video
- Mica Paris – "Where Is The Love" ft. Will Downing on YouTube

British soul singer Mica Paris and American singer-songwriter Will Downing released a cover of "Where Is the Love" in 1989 for Paris' debut album So Good.

"Where Is the Love" debuted at number twenty-eight on the UK Singles Chart, peaking at number nineteen in its second week before accumulating a total of eight weeks on the chart.

=== Track listing ===
CD single

No.	Title	Artist	Length
1.	"Where Is the Love"	Mica Paris & Will Downing	3:33
2.	"My One Temptation" (Radio Mix)	Mica Paris	3:40
3.	"A Love Supreme"	Will Downing	3:29
4.	"Same Feeling"	Mica Paris	3:59

Vinyl

Side one
No.	Title	Artist	Length
1.	"Where Is the Love"	Mica Paris & Will Downing	3:33
2.	"My One Temptation" (Radio Mix)	Mica Paris	3:40

Side two
No.	Title	Artist	Length
1.	"A Love Supreme"	Will Downing	3:29
2.	"Same Feeling"	Mica Paris	3:59

=== Charts ===
Chart (1989)	Peak position
Ireland (IRMA)	21
Luxembourg (Radio Luxembourg)	18
Netherlands (Single Top 100)	51
UK Singles (Official Charts)	19

== Rick Price and Margaret Urlich version ==
"Where is the Love"

Single by Rick Price and Margaret Urlich

from the album Live
- Released: November 29, 1993
- Length: 2:58
- Label: Columbia Records
- Songwriters: Ralph MacDonald; William Salter
- Producer: Rick Price

Rick Price singles chronology
"Walk Away Renée" (1993)	"Where is the Love" (1993)	"River of Love" (1995)

Margaret Urlich singles chronology
"Burnt Sienna" (1993)	"Where is the Love" (1993)	"I Don't Know How To Love Him" (1994)

"Where is the Love" was recorded by Australian singer songwriter Rick Price and New Zealand-born singer-songwriter Margaret Urlich. It was released on November 29, 1993, and peaked at number 31 in Australia. It was included as a bonus track on Ulrich's 1994 album, Live.

In 1993, Price and Urlich were part of Export Music Australia (EMA) and Austrade's second Wizards of Oz promotion. They toured Japan together with the group Yothu Yindi.

At the ARIA Music Awards of 1994, the song was nominated for ARIA Award for Best Adult Contemporary Album but lost to The Journey by Tommy Emmanuel.

=== Track listing ===
CD single (659884 2)

1. "Where Is the Love" – 2:58
2. "If You Were My Baby" by Rick Price (acoustic) – 4:14
3. "Love Train" by Margaret Ulrich (live) – 4:21

=== Charts ===
Chart (1993)	Peak position
Australia (ARIA)	31

== See also ==
- List of number-one adult contemporary singles of 1972 (U.S.)
- List of number-one R&B singles of 1972 (U.S.)
