= River of Love (Rick Price song) =

1995 single by Rick Price

Single by Rick Price

from the album Tamborine Mountain
- B-side: "Love Never Dies"
- Released: 1 May 1995
- Length: 4:43
- Label: Columbia
- Songwriters: Harold Fields, Rick Price
- Producers: Ben Wisch, Rick Price

Rick Price singles chronology
"Where is the Love" (1993)	"River of Love" (1995)	"Bridge Building Man" (1995)

"River of Love" is a song by Australian singer-songwriter Rick Price. It was released as the first single from his second studio album, Tamborine Mountain. The song peaked at No. 18 in Australia. At the ARIA Music Awards of 1995, "River of Love" was nominated for Best Male Artist but lost to Solid State Rhyme by Diesel.

== Track listing ==
Australian CD single

1. "River of Love"
2. "Love Never Dies"

== Charts ==
Chart (1995)	Peak position
Australia (ARIA)	18
