= Heaven Knows (Rick Price album) =

Studio album by Rick Price
- Released: 10 July 1992
- Recorded: 1991
- Genre: Pop, pop rock
- Length: 0:42:03
- Label: Sony Music-Columbia
- Producer: Chris Lord-Alge

Rick Price chronology
Heaven Knows (1992)	Tamborine Mountain (1995)

Singles from Heaven Knows
- 1. "Not a Day Goes By" Released: February 1992; 2. "Heaven Knows" Released: July 1992; 3. "What's Wrong with That Girl" Released: September 1992; 4. "A House Divided" Released: February 1993; 5. "Walk Away Renée" Released: May 1993

Heaven Knows is the debut album by Australian singer-songwriter Rick Price, released in July 1992 through Sony Music-Columbia. It peaked at No. 3 in Australia in July 1992 and spent 23 weeks in the ARIA top 40 chart, and was also successful internationally in numerous countries. The album spawned five singles, all of which charted on the ARIA charts, with its first two singles cracking the top ten. The second single and title track "Heaven Knows" also charted in many countries in Europe and Asia and won the APRA Award song of the year. The fourth single was a cover of The Left Banke hit Walk Away Renee.

There were three issues of the album including a U.S. release and a double deluxe-CD Australian Tour Pressing in 1993. The album features a duet with renowned singer Tina Arena.

== Track listing ==
CD

1. "What's Wrong with That Girl" (P. Buckle, R. Price) - 4:08
2. "Not a Day Goes By" (P. Reswick, R. Price, S. Werfel) - 4:17
3. "A House Divided" (P. Reswick, R. Price, S. Werfel) - 4:22
4. "Walk Away Renée" (B. Calilli, M, Brown, T. Sansone) - 4:26
5. "Heaven Knows" (H. Field, R. Price) - 4:25
6. "Church on Fire" (P. Reswick, R. Price, S. Werfel) - 4:52
7. "Life Without You" (P. Reswick, R. Price, S. Werfel) - 3:43
8. "Foollin' Myself" (H. Field, R. Price) - 3:44
9. "Forever Me and You" (H. Field, P. Gleeson, R. Price) - 4:14
10. "Fragile" (H. Field, R. Price) - 3:28

== Deluxe edition ==
=== 1993 re-release bonus disc ===
1. "Listen to Your Heart"
2. "If You Were My Baby"
3. "Wishin"
4. "We've Got Each Other"
5. "Not a Day Goes By" (Acoustic Version)
6. "Where Are You Now" (with Jon Bon Jovi)

Later pressings of the bonus disc also included Price's version of Peter Allen's classic "Tenterfield Saddler", which Price recorded as a tribute to Allen, who died in 1992.

== Personnel ==
- Rick Price – vocals, acoustic guitar, backing vocals
- Tina Arena – backing vocals
- Neil Stubenhaus – bass guitar
- John Robinson – drums, percussion
- Michael Thompson – guitar
- Jimmy "Z" Zavala – harmonica
- Frank Marocco – piano, accordion
- Claude Gaudette – piano, Hammond organ

== Charts ==
=== Weekly charts ===
Chart (1992–1993)	Peak position
Australian Albums (ARIA)	3
German Albums (Offizielle Top 100)	96

=== Year-end charts ===
Chart (1993)	Position
Australian Albums Chart	45
Australian Artist Albums Chart	11

=== Certifications ===
Region	Certification	Certified units/sales
Australia (ARIA)	Platinum	70,000^{^}
^{^} Shipments figures based on certification alone.
