= Mount Tamborine, Queensland =

Mount Tamborine Queensland
- Coordinates: 27.9725°S 153.1977°E
- Population: 1,184 (2006 census)
- Established: 1875
- Postcode(s): 4272
- Time zone: AEST (UTC+10:00)
- Location: 32.8 km (20 mi) NE of Beaudesert; 37.1 km (23 mi) WNW of Southport; 35.4 km (22 mi) WNW of Surfers Paradise; 72.0 km (45 mi) SSE of Brisbane CBD
- LGA(s): Scenic Rim Region
- State electorate(s): Scenic Rim
- Federal division(s): Wright

Mount Tamborine is a town within the locality of Tamborine Mountain in South East Queensland, Australia.

== History ==
Mount Tamborine Post Office had opened by March 1924 (a receiving office had been open from 1881, originally known as Tambourine Mountain), was renamed Mount Tamborine in 1926 and closed in 1977.

The name "Tamborine" is taken from the Yugambeh language for "wild lime", after the finger lime trees in the area. Tamborine was sometimes spelt as "tchambreem", "jambreen" and "goombireen".

Formerly a suburb in its own right, in 1997, Mount Tamborine was merged with other former suburbs North Tamborine and Eagle Heights to create the larger locality of Tamborine Mountain. All three suburbs now have the postcode 4272 and postal address of Tamborine Mountain. The postcode 4271 is reserved for the post office at Eagle Heights (which closed down permanently in 2024).

== Demographics ==
In the 2006 census, Mount Tamborine had a population of 1,184 people. There has not been any census data reported for the town of Mount Tamborine after 2006.

== Heritage listings ==
Mount Tamborine has a number of heritage-listed sites, including:

- Tamborine Mountain Road, Geissmann Drive

== See also ==
- Tamborine National Park
