= Boy in the Moon =

Single by Margaret Urlich

from the album Chameleon Dreams
- B-side: "Make It Last"
- Released: 13 July 1992
- Genre: Pop
- Length: 5:06
- Label: Columbia Records
- Songwriters: Barry Blue, Robyn Smith
- Producer: Robyn Smith

Margaret Urlich singles chronology
"Guilty People" (1990)	"Boy in the Moon" (1992)	"Human Race" (1992)

"Boy in the Moon" is a song from New Zealand singer Margaret Urlich. The song was released in July 1992 as the lead single from her second studio album, Chameleon Dreams. The song peaked at number 21 in Australia and number 9 in New Zealand.

== Track listing ==
CD single/7" (Columbia 6579732)

1. "Boy in the Moon" – 5:06
2. "Make It Last" – 4:30
3. "Boy in the Moon" (Over the Moon Version) – 6:25

== Charts ==
Chart performance for "Boy in the Moon"
Chart (1992)	Peak position
Australia (ARIA)	21
New Zealand (Recorded Music NZ)	9

2022 chart performance for "Boy in the Moon"
Chart (2022)	Peak position
Australia Digital Tracks (ARIA)	33
