= Not a Day Goes By (Rick Price song) =

1992 single by Rick Price

Single by Rick Price

from the album Heaven Knows
- B-side: "Fragile"
- Released: 17 February 1992
- Length: 4:18
- Label: Columbia
- Songwriter(s): Pam Reswick, Steve Werfel, Rick Price
- Producer(s): Chris Lord-Alge

Rick Price singles chronology
| "Living Without Your Love" (1990) | "Not a Day Goes By" (1992) | "Heaven Knows" (1992) |

"Not a Day Goes By" is a song by Australian singer-songwriter Rick Price. It was released as the first single from his debut studio album, Heaven Knows. The song peaked at No. 5 in Australia and No. 73 in Germany. Additionally, the song was released in the United Kingdom in September 1992. At the ARIA Music Awards of 1993, "Not a Day Goes By" was nominated for Best New Talent and Breakthrough Artist.

== Track listings ==
CD single

1. "Not a Day Goes By" (with Jon Bon Jovi and Richie Sambora) – 4:18
2. "Fragile" – 3:26
3. I'll Be There for You (with Jon Bon Jovi and Richie Sambora)

CD maxi

1. "Not a Day Goes By" (with Jon Bon Jovi and Richie Sambora) – 4:18
2. "Listen to Your Heart" (with Jon Bon Jovi) – 3:48
3. "Fragile" – 3:26

== Charts ==
=== Weekly charts ===
| Chart (1992) | Peak position |
|---|---|
| Australia (ARIA) | 5 |
| Germany (GfK) | 73 |

=== Year-end charts ===
| Chart (1992) | Position |
|---|---|
| Australia (ARIA) | 42 |

== Certifications ==
| Region | Certification | Certified units/sales |
|---|---|---|
| Australia (ARIA) | Gold | 35,000^{^} |
^{^} Shipments figures based on certification alone.
