= Human Race (Margaret Urlich song) =

Single by Margaret Urlich

from the album Chameleon Dreams
- B-side: "Human Race" (remix)
- Released: 23 November 1992
- Genre: Pop
- Length: 4:28
- Label: Columbia
- Songwriter(s): Ian Prince, Margaret Urlich
- Producer(s): Ian Prince

Margaret Urlich singles chronology
"Boy in the Moon" (1990)	"Human Race" (1992)	"(I Don't Want to Be) Second Best" (1993)

"Human Race" is a song from New Zealand singer Margaret Urlich. The song was released in November 1992 as the second single from her second studio album, Chameleon Dreams. The song peaked at number 55 in Australia.

== Track listing ==
CD Maxi (Columbia 658475 4)

1. "Human Race" – 4:28
2. "Human Race" (Blitzed Out Mix) – 6:25
3. "Human Race" (Instrumental) – 5:30

== Charts ==
Chart performance for "Human Race"
Chart (1993)	Peak position
Australia (ARIA)	55
