= Mica Paris discography =

- Studio albums: 8
- Extended plays: 4
- Compilation albums: 1
- Singles: 36

The discography of British singer Mica Paris consists of eight studio albums, one compilation album, four EPs and thirty six singles.

== Albums ==
=== Studio albums ===
List of albums, with selected chart positions, sales figures and certifications
Title	Album details	Peak chart positions						Certifications (sales thresholds)
Title	Album details	UK	UK R&B	NL	NZ	US	US R&B /HH	Certifications (sales thresholds)
So Good	Released: 27 August 1988; Label: 4th & Broadway / Island; Format: LP, CD, cassette	6	—	91	38	86	29	BPI: Platinum
Contribution	Released: 20 October 1990; Label: 4th & Broadway / Island; Format: LP, CD, cassette	26	—	—	—	—	58	BPI: Silver
Whisper a Prayer	Released: 8 June 1993; Label: 4th & Broadway / Island; Format: LP, CD, cassette	20	—	—	—	—	99	
Black Angel	Released: 10 August 1998; Label: Cooltempo / Chrysalis; Format: LP, CD	59	10	—	—	—	—	
If You Could Love Me	Released: 4 April 2005 (US); Label: Wounded Bird; Format: CD	—	—	—	—	—	—	
Soul Classics	Released: 26 September 2005; Label: Sanctuary; Format: CD	—	—	—	—	—	—	
Born Again	Released: 1 June 2009; Label: Rhythm Riders; Format: CD, digital download	—	—	—	—	—	—	
Gospel	Released: 4 December 2020; Label: East West, Warner; Format: CD, digital download	43	1	—	—	—	—	
"—" denotes items which were not released in that country or failed to chart.

=== Compilation albums ===
List of albums, with selected details
Title	Album details
The Best of Mica Paris	Released: 28 June 1999; Label: Spectrum; Format: CD

== Extended plays ==
List of extended plays, with selected details
Title	Album details
My One Temptation / God Bless The Child / Rock Together	Released: 1988; Label: Island; Format: Vinyl (7")
Convention E.P.	Released: 1989; Label: Island; Format: Vinyl (12")
I Love U 2 Nite	Released: 1991; Label: Island; Format: Vinyl (12")
Whisper a Prayer	Released: 1993; Label: Island; Format: Vinyl (12")

== Singles ==
=== As a lead artist ===
List of singles, with selected chart positions and certifications, showing year released and album name
Title	Year	Chart positions										Album
Title	Year	UK	UK R&B	AUS	GER	IRE	NLD	NZ	US	US R&B /HH	US Dance	Album
"My One Temptation"	1988	7	—	100	30	15	39	37	97	15	36	So Good
"Like Dreamers Do" (featuring Courtney Pine)	1988	26	—	—	—	—	—	—	—	—	—	So Good
"Breathe Life into Me"	1988	26	—	—	—	—	72	—	—	24	—	So Good
"Where Is the Love" (with Will Downing)	1989	19	—	—	—	21	51	—	—	—	—	So Good
"Contribution" (featuring Rakim)	1990	33	—	184	—	—	—	—	—	39	20	Contribution
"South of the River"	1990	50	—	—	—	—	—	—	—	59	—	Contribution
"If I Love U 2 Nite"	1991	43	—	—	—	—	—	—	—	—	—	Contribution
"Young Soul Rebels"	1991	61	—	—	—	—	—	—	—	—	—	Young Soul Rebels OST
"I Never Felt Like This Before"	1993	15	—	—	53	—	—	—	—	—	—	Whisper a Prayer
"I Wanna Hold On to You"	1993	27	—	—	—	—	—	—	—	46	—	Whisper a Prayer
"Two in a Million"	1993	51	—	—	—	—	—	—	—	—	—	Whisper a Prayer
"Whisper a Prayer"	1993	65	—	—	—	—	—	—	—	—^{[A]}	—	Whisper a Prayer
"One"	1995	29	5	89	—	—	—	50	—	—	—	Non-album single
"Stay"	1998	40	10	—	—	—	—	31	—	—	—	Black Angel
"Carefree"	1998	—	—	—	—	—	—	—	—	—	—	Black Angel
"Black Angel"	1998	72	19	—	—	—	—	—	—	—	—	Black Angel
"Tracks of My Tears"	2005	—	—	—	—	—	—	—	—	—	—	Soul Classics
"Baby Come Back Now"	2009	—	—	—	—	—	—	—	—	—	—	Born Again
"The Hardest Thing"	2009	—	—	—	—	—	—	—	—	—	—	Born Again
"Born Again"	2010	—	—	—	—	—	—	—	—	—	—	Born Again
"Ev'ry Time We Say Goodbye" "Imagine My Frustration"	2017	—	—	—	—	—	—	—	—	—	—	Non-album single
"Mamma Said"	2020	—	—	—	—	—	—	—	—	—	—	Gospel
"(Something Inside) So Strong"	2020	—	—	—	—	—	—	—	—	—	—	Gospel
"Take My Hand, Oh Precious Lord"	2020	—	—	—	—	—	—	—	—	—	—	Gospel
"Amazing Grace"	2020	—	—	—	—	—	—	—	—	—	—	Gospel
"—" denotes releases that did not chart or were not released in that territory.

=== As a featured artist ===
List of singles, with selected chart positions and certifications, showing year released and album name
Title	Year	Chart positions					Album
Title	Year	UK	UK R&B	UK Dance	UK Indie	SCO	Album
"Redemption Song" (Courtney Pine featuring Mica Paris)	1992	93	—	—	—	—	To the Eyes of Creation
"Fast Response"^{[B]} (Max Beesley's High Vibes feat. Sara Cimpi)	1994	—	—	—	—	—	Non-album single
"Police and Thieves" (Dubversive featuring Boy George)	1994	—	—	—	—	—	Non-album single
"Ain't No Stopping Us Now" (The MOBO Allstars featuring Another Level, Beverley Knight, Byron Stingily, Celetia, Cleopatra, Conner Reeves, Damage, Des'ree, D'Influence, E17, Glamma Kid, Hinda Hicks, Honeyz, Kele Le Roc, Kelle Bryan, Kle'Shay, Karen Ramirez, Lynden David Hall, Mica Paris, Michelle Gayle, Nine Yards, Roachford, 7th Son, Shola Ama, Soundproof, Truce, Tony Momrelle, Ultimate Kaos...and many more)	1998	47	9	—	—	74	Non-album single
"Bodyswerve" (M-Gee featuring Mica Paris)	2003	112	—	—	40	—	Non-album single
"Thru the Fire" (Asmodeus)	2003	—	—	—	—	—	Non-album single
"Heart" (Seraphim Suite)	2004	45	—	38	6	38	Non-album single
"Over" (Seraphim Suite)	2004	—	—	—	—	—	Non-album single
"We Will Remember Them" (Hayley Westernra, Robin Gibb, Mica Paris, Michael Bolton, Paul Rodgers)	2009	—	—	—	—	—	Non-album single
"Believe" (Commonwealth Youth Orchestra featuring Mica Paris)	2019	—	—	—	—	—	Non-album single
"Heaven" (Low Steppa featuring Mica Paris)	2020	—	—	—	—	—	Boiling Point
"—" denotes releases that did not chart or were not released in that territory.

=== Promotional singles ===
List of promotional singles, with selected chart positions, showing year released and album name
Title	Year	Chart positions	Album
Title	Year	US R&B /HH	Album
"Don't Give Me Up"	1989	87	So Good

== Album appearances ==
Song	Year	Artist(s)	Album
"There's a War Going On"	1986	The Spirit of Watts	Gospel Joy - A Live Celebration
"The Resurrection"	1986	The Spirit of Watts	Gospel Joy - A Live Celebration
"Crimes of Passion"	1987	Hollywood Beyond	If
"Chase Across The World"	1987	Annabel Lamb	Brides
"Come to Me"	1987	Annabel Lamb	Brides
"Sweet Jane"	1987	Annabel Lamb	Brides
"Don't Let Up"	1992	Stereo MCs (featuring Mica Paris)	Connected
"Redemption Song"	1992	Courtney Pine	To the Eyes of Creation
"Confection"	1994	Omar	For Pleasure
"One on One"	1994	Ray Hayden (featuring Mica Paris)	Opaz Back from the Raggedy Edges
"Looking Through Darkness "	1995	Guru	Guru's Jazzmatazz, Vol. 2: The New Reality
"Sumthin' Sumthin'"	1996	Maxwell	Maxwell's Urban Hang Suite
"I, Is All I Ever Hear"	1996	Jools Holland & His Rhythm & Blues Orchestra	Sex & Jazz & Rock & Roll
"Count to Ten"	1996	Jools Holland & His Rhythm & Blues Orchestra	Sex & Jazz & Rock & Roll
"Tears for You"	1996	Mark Morrison (featuring Mica Paris)	Return of the Mack
"One Million Smiles"	1998	Mr. Exe (featuring Mica Paris)	One Million Smiles
"Funky Lover"	1998	Mr. Exe (featuring Mica Paris)	One Million Smiles
"I Put a Spell on You"	2002	Jools Holland (with Mica Paris and David Gilmour)	Jools Holland's Big Band Rhythm & Blues
"I Don't Understand"	2003	Milk & Sugar (featuring Mica Paris)	Housemusic.de
"Let It Be"	2004	The New Inspirational Choir (featuring Mica Paris)	Inspirations
"Many Rivers to Cross"	2004	The New Inspirational Choir (featuring Mica Paris)	Inspirations
"Run"	2006	Jimmy Barnes (featuring Mica Paris)	Double Happiness
"Can't You See"	2006	Lemar (featuring Styles P & Mica Paris)	The Truth About Love
"Secret Lovers"	2008	Alexander O'Neal (featuring Mica Paris)	Alex Loves...
"Lily"	2011	Kate Bush	Director's Cut
"Today"	2015	David Gilmour	Rattle That Lock
"Rattle That Lock"	2015	David Gilmour	Rattle That Lock
"No Explanation"	2018	Chris Standring (featuring Mica Paris)	Sunlight
"I Am the Starlight" (From Starlight Express)	2018	Mica Paris & George Ure	Unmasked: The Platinum Collection
"I Want to Thank You"	2018	Reel People (featuring Mica Paris)	Retroflection
"Angel"	2019	Brian McFadden (featuring Mica Paris)	Otis

== Soundtrack appearances ==
Song	Year	Artist(s)	Movie
"Young Soul Rebels"	1991	Mica Paris	Young Soul Rebels
"High Heels and Low Lifes"	2001	Mica Paris	High Heels and Low Lifes

== Songwriting discography ==
List of releases by other artists where Mica Paris is a credited songwriter
Title	Year	Artist(s)	Writer(s)	Album
"One On One"	1992	Ray Hayden	Ray Hayden, Mica Paris	Back! from the Raggedy Edge
"Keep Givin' Me Lovin'"	1992	Chaka Khan	Andres Levin, Camus Celli, Chaka Khan, Mica Paris	The Woman I Am
"Remember Me"	2012	Daley	Robert Miller, Marlena Shaw, Mica Paris, Omar, Richard Evans	Alone Together
"1 World"	2013	Michele Chiavarini	Andres Levin, Camus Celli, Mica Paris, Michele Chiavarini, Tyrone Henry	Non album single

== Videography ==
=== Music videos ===
Title	Year	Director(s)	Artist
"My One Temptation"	1988		Mica Paris
"Like Dreamers Do"	1988		Mica Paris (featuring Courtney Pine)
"Breathe Life into Me"	1988		Mica Paris
"Where Is the Love"	1989		Mica Paris (with Will Downing)
"Contribution"	1990		Mica Paris (featuring Rakim)
"South of the River"	1990		Mica Paris
"If I Love U 2 Nite"	1991		Mica Paris
"Young Soul Rebels"	1991		Mica Paris
"I Never Felt Like This Before"	1993		Mica Paris
"I Wanna Hold On to You"	1993	Matthew Rolston	Mica Paris
"Two In a Million"	1993	Pierluca D. DeCarlo	Mica Paris
"Whisper a Prayer"	1993		Mica Paris
"One"	1995	Daniela Federici	Mica Paris
"Stay"	1998		Mica Paris
"Carefree"	1998		Mica Paris
"Baby Come Back Now"	2008		Mica Paris
"Born Again"	2008		Mica Paris

== Notes ==
- A Although "Whisper a Prayer" did not chart on the Billboard R&B/Hip-Hop Songs chart, it peaked at number 22 on the US Bubbling Under R&B/Hip-Hop Songs chart.
- B On "Fast Response", Mica Paris appears under the alias Sara Crimpi.
