= Contribution =

Contribution may refer to:

== Music ==
- Contribution (album), by Mica Paris (1990)
  - "Contribution" (song), title song from the album
- Contribution, a 1976 album by Shawn Phillips
- A contribution concert is where a band plays in the songs of or in the style of a separate band

== Finance and law ==
- Contribution (law), an agreement between defendants in a suit to apportion liability
- Contributions, a vital goal of fundraising
- Contribution margin, the selling price per unit minus the variable cost per unit
- Contribution, a principle of insurance

== Sport ==
- Goal contribution, a player statistic in association football

== See also ==
- Adobe Contribute, former web-editing software
