= I Never Felt Like This Before =

1993 single by Mica Paris

Single by Mica Paris

from the album Whisper a Prayer
- B-side: "Call Me by My Name"
- Released: 22 March 1993
- Studio: Tarpan (San Rafael, California)
- Length: 4:16
- Label: Island; 4th & Broadway
- Songwriters: Narada Michael Walden; Sally Jo Dakota
- Producers: Narada Michael Walden; Mike Mani

Mica Paris singles chronology
"Young Soul Rebels" (1991)	"I Never Felt Like This Before" (1993)	"I Wanna Hold on to You" (1993)

Music video
- "I Never Felt Like This Before" on YouTube

"I Never Felt Like This Before" is a song by British singer-songwriter Mica Paris. Released in March 1993 by Island Records and 4th & Broadway as the lead single from her third studio album, Whisper a Prayer (1993), it became her second top-20 hit on the UK Singles Chart and the highest-placing release from the album. The song was written by Narada Michael Walden and Sally Jo Dakota, and produced by Walden with Mike Mani.

== Critical reception ==
Pan-European magazine Music & Media wrote, "Together with Walden, Paris has "Americanised" her sound considerably. Now we all know who Whitney's main competitor will be." Head of music Clive Dickens at Chiltern Network/UK said, "This is a returning to form by Mica Paris, who always had a lot of credit here. Walden managed to get the very best out of her. It's an exceptional song that should have wide appeal. It should cross over from dance to hot ACE and EHR. It's a really great record to start the hour with." James Hamilton from Music Week's RM Dance Update described it as a "sultry wailer" in his weekly dance column.

== Music video ==
The accompanying music video for "I Never Felt Like This Before" was directed by Australian writer and film director Jonathan Teplitzky and filmed in Barbados. It was produced by Martin Teplitzky for Partizan Films and released on 22 March 1993. In the video, lush hills and sandy beaches along the Barbados coastline provide a luxurious setting, enhanced by saturated colour.

== Track listing ==
UK 7-inch single

Side one
No.	Title	Writer(s)	Producer(s)	Length
1.	"I Never Felt Like This Before" (radio edit)	Narada Michael Walden, Mica Paris, Sally Jo Dakota	Narada Michael Walden, Mike Mani, Monty Seward	4:15

Side two
No.	Title	Writer(s)	Producer(s)	Length
1.	"Call Me by My Name"	Glen Goldsmith, Paul Johnson, Phil Edwards	Glen Goldsmith, Paul Johnson, Phil Edwards, Mica Paris	4:01

UK 12-inch single

Side one
No.	Title	Writer(s)	Producer(s)	Length
1.	"I Never Felt Like This Before" (classic club mix)	Narada Michael Walden, Mica Paris, Sally Jo Dakota	Frankie Knuckles	6:38
2.	"I Should've Known Better"	Mica Paris, Omar	Omar	5:38

Side two
No.	Title	Writer(s)	Producer(s)	Length
1.	"Call Me by My Name"	Glen Goldsmith, Paul Johnson, Phil Edwards	Glen Goldsmith, Paul Johnson, Phil Edwards, Mica Paris	5:10
2.	"I Never Felt Like This Before"	Narada Michael Walden, Mica Paris, Sally Jo Dakota

UK CD single

No.	Title	Writer(s)	Producer(s)	Length
1.	"I Never Felt Like This Before" (radio edit)	Narada Michael Walden, Mica Paris, Sally Jo Dakota	Absolute	4:15
2.	"I Never Felt Like This Before" (classic club mix)	Narada Michael Walden, Mica Paris, Sally Jo Dakota	Narada Michael Walden, Mike Mani	6:38
3.	"I Should've Known Better"	Mica Paris, Omar	Omar	5:38
4.	"Call Me by My Name"	Glen Goldsmith, Paul Johnson, Phil Edwards	Glen Goldsmith, Paul Johnson, Phil Edwards, Mica Paris	4:01

== Personnel ==
Personnel are obtained from the Whisper a Prayer liner notes.

Performance credits

- Lead vocals – Mica Paris
- Background vocals – Claytoven Richardson, Kitty Beethoven, Sandy Griffith, Tony Lindsay, Nicole "Darlin' Nikki" Bradin

Instruments

- Keyboards – Narada Michael Walden, Mike Mani, Monty Seward
- Percussion – Narada Michael Walden

Technical and production

- Arrangement – Narada Michael Walden
- Songwriters – Narada Michael Walden, Sally Jo Dakota, Mica Paris
- Engineering – Marc 'Elvis' Reyburn, Mike Mani, John Poppo (Classic Club Mix), Tim Bran ("I Should've Known Better"), Nick Wollage ("Call Me by My Name")
- Engineering assistants – Jeff 'G' Gray
- Mastering – Bernie Grundman
- Mixing – David 'Frazeman' Frazer
- Production – Narada Michael Walden, Mike Mani, Monty Seward, Frankie Knuckles (Classic Club Mix)
- Programming – Mike Mani, Monty Seward

== Charts ==
=== Weekly charts ===
Chart (1993)	Peak position
Europe (Eurochart Hot 100)	61
Europe (European Dance Radio)	4
Europe (European Hit Radio)	23
Germany (GfK)	53
Iceland (Íslenski Listinn Topp 40)	24
UK Singles (OCC)	15
UK Airplay (Music Week)	4
UK Dance (Music Week)	9
UK Club Chart (Music Week)	4

=== Year-end charts ===
Chart (1993)	Position
UK Club Chart (Music Week)	88
