= If You Want Me to Stay =

1973 single by Sly and the Family Stone

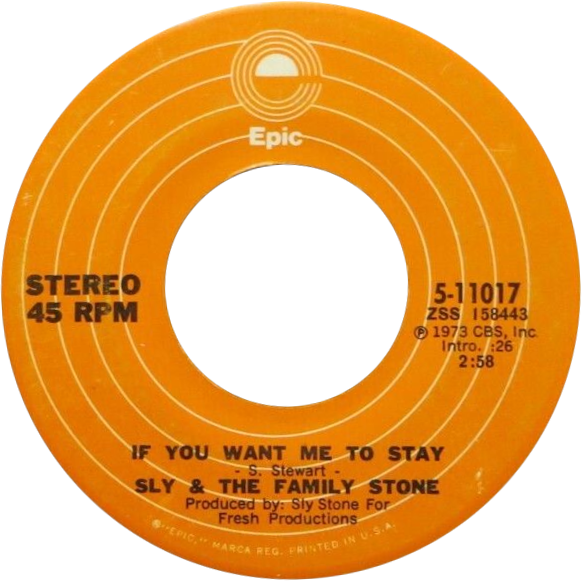
- One of side-A labels of the US single

Single by Sly and the Family Stone

from the album Fresh
- B-side: "Babies Makin' Babies"
- Released: June 7, 1973
- Recorded: 1972–1973
- Genre: Funk; soul
- Length: 3:01; 2:40 (alternate take)
- Label: Epic; 11017
- Songwriter: Sly Stone
- Producer: Sly Stone

Sly and the Family Stone singles chronology
"(You Caught Me) Smilin'" (1972)	"If You Want Me to Stay" (1973)	"Frisky" (1973)

"If You Want Me to Stay" is a 1973 hit single by Sly and the Family Stone, from their album Fresh.

== Background ==
Stone recorded the song without much input from the rest of the band; by the early 1970s, he had begun crafting most of his material by himself. An alternate version of "If You Want Me to Stay", as well as most of the rest of the Fresh album, was completed before Stone decided to scrap the masters and re-record the album. These alternate versions have surfaced in underground markets, online auctions, and specialty shops. However, five bonus tracks are included in Epic's 2007 reissue of Fresh, all of which are directly from the alternate mix of the album.

Record World said that it "is as bizarre as his other outings and just as commercial."

== Song analysis ==
The lyrics of "If You Want Me to Stay" feature frontman Sly Stone informing his lover that she has to let him be himself, otherwise he feels that he would have to leave. The composition has its origins in an apology Stone wrote to his future wife, Kathleen Silva, after a fight.

== Chart performance ==
"If You Want Me to Stay" was the band's final Top 20 pop hit, and is the best-known of its post-There's a Riot Goin' On recordings. The single reached number 12 on the Pop Chart, and number three on the Billboard R&B Singles Chart.

== Certifications ==
Region	Certification	Certified units/sales
New Zealand (RMNZ)	Gold	15,000^{‡}
United States (RIAA)	Platinum	1,000,000^{‡}
^{‡} Sales+streaming figures based on certification alone.

== Personnel ==
- Sly Stone — vocals, guitar, piano, organ. b
- Rustee Allen - bass guitar
- Andy Newmark — drums
- Cynthia Robinson — trumpet
- Jerry Martini — saxophone
- Pat Rizzo — saxophone

Note: A transcription of the bass part for this song appears in the October 2006 issue of Bass Player magazine (pages 78–81). According to the article "Rustee Allen’s Complete Bass Line: Sly & The Family Stone's 'If You Want Me To Stay'" accompanying the transcription, written by Chris Jisi:

"The ambitiously named 'Fresh' hit the streets in early July. A stripped-down, more raw outing than previous Sly albums, the 11-track set was boosted by the bass waves of Graham's hand-picked replacement, Rustee Allen. Sly himself laid down some of the album's bass tracks."

== Mica Paris version ==
"Stay"

Single by Mica Paris

from the album Black Angel
- Released: May 11, 1998
- Genre: Downtempo; soul
- Length: 4:36
- Label: Cooltempo
- Songwriter: Sly Stone
- Producer: Julian Jackson

Mica Paris singles chronology
"One" (1995)	"Stay" (1998)	"Carefree" (1998)

Music video
- "Stay" on YouTube

British soul singer Mica Paris released a version of "Stay" in 1998, as the lead single from her fourth album, Black Angel (1998). Her version spent two weeks on the UK Singles Chart before peaking at number forty on May 16, 1998. It also reached the top forty of the New Zealand Singles Chart.

=== Critical reception ===
British magazine Music Week wrote, "Paris adds characteristic — if slightly mannered — vocal swoops to a faithful rendition of the Sly & The Family Stone classic. Still, it's a welcome return for one of the best soul voices the UK has yet produced and provides a taste of her long-delayed forthcoming album Black Angel."

=== Track listing ===
CD single

No.	Title	Lyrics	Producer	Length
1.	"Stay" (Original Edit)	Sly Stone	Julian Jackson; Richie Stevens	4:20
2.	"Stay" (Blacksmith Club Rub featuring Know ?uestion)	Sly Stone	Blacksmith
3.	"Stay" (Brooklyn Funk R'n'B Mix)	Sly Stone	Brooklyn Funk
4.	"Stay" (Booker T's Vocal Lick)	Sly Stone	Booker T
5.	"Stay" (K-Klassic Mix)	Sly Stone	K-Klassic
6.	"Stay" (B Drop Radio Edit)	Sly Stone	B Drop

=== Credits and personnel ===
Performers

- Vocals - Mica Paris
- Backing Vocals – Jackie Farris, Jackie Gouche, Jackie Smiley
- Bass – Raphael Saadiq
- Drum Programming – Richie Stevens
- Guitar – Keven Frost
- Keyboards – Pete Adams
- Remix – Richie Stevens
- Saxophone [Tenor] – Ben Castle
- Trumpet – Raul D'Oliveira

=== Charts ===
==== Weekly charts ====
Chart (1998)	Peak position
Japan (Tokio Hot 100)	6
New Zealand (Recorded Music NZ)	31
Scotland Singles (Official Charts)	67
UK Singles (Official Charts)	40
UK Hip Hop/R&B (Official Charts)	10
UK Dance (Official Charts)	11

==== Year-end charts ====
Chart (1998)	Position
UK Urban (Music Week)	28

== Cover versions ==
The song has been covered extensively since its introduction, by artists including Etta James, Eric Benet, Mercury Rev, Victor Wooten, Soulive, Pama International, Ronny, Kermit Ruffins, and the Red Hot Chili Peppers. The song has also been featured in the movies Made in Heaven, Talk to Me, Dead Presidents, and Money Talks.

In 2020, Ari Lennox and Anthony Ramos released a cover in partnership with Main Street Alliance — a nonprofit organization committed to supporting small businesses in the United States — and Crown Royal in donation to help the landmark small businesses and communities all over the country.

== Sample ==
As with most of Sly Stone's work, many songs have sampled the bass line from "If You Want Me to Stay", including:

- Dre' Dog, aka Andre Nickatina, in his 1991 album The New Jim Jones in the song "Summer in Florida".
- Dana Dane from the 1990 album Dana Dane 4 Ever in the song "Tales from the Dane Side".
