= Little Quirks =

Australian indie folk band

- Origin: Gosford, New South Wales, Australia
- Genres: Folk; indie rock; country rock
- Years active: 2015–present
- Label: ABC
- Members: Abbey Toole; Mia Toole; Lachlan Raeside; Jordan Rouse
- Past members: Jaymi Toole; Alex Toole
- Website: littlequirksband.com

Little Quirks are an Australian indie folk band formed in Gosford, New South Wales in 2015 by sisters Abbey Toole (guitar, vocals) and Mia Toole (drums, vocals) and their cousin Jaymi Toole (mandolin, vocals). The band toured Australia and have released five extended plays. In 2019 they were joined by Alex Toole (Jaymi's older brother) on bass guitar, and since late 2021 Jordan Rouse provided electric guitar. Their self-titled debut album was issued in September 2024 on ABC.

== History ==
Little Quirks were formed in 2015 in Gosford on the Central Coast, New South Wales by Abbey Toole on guitar and lead vocals, her younger sister Mia Toole on drums and vocals, and their older cousin, Jaymi Toole on mandolin and vocals. They started busking at food markets by playing cover versions of tracks by the Cranberries, Of Monsters and Men, and Vance Joy. The band were named by one of their parents, Abbey recalled, "We have always been very quirky kids and have our own little ways we do things." The band members' fathers had performed together in groups including Adam's Apple and in Sugarmoth.

Little Quirks issued their first extended play, Where We Hide, in 2016. It was produced by Abbey and Mia's father Adam Toole. Their early influences were The Lumineers and Mumford and Sons. The trio toured in support of Jack River, Xavier Rudd and Alex the Astronaut. Their second EP, Suzie Knows, appeared in 2017. In November of the following year they toured Western Australia. In 2019 their track, "Cover My Eyes", co-written by the trio, was a semi-finalist in two categories at the International Songwriting Competition: Americana and Folk, Singer-Songwriter. The group performed at the National Folk Festival during Easter, April 2019, in Canberra – their fathers had performed at the same festival when they were younger. Abbey described Little Quirks' music, "Folk is for all ages. It's one of the rawest and most real styles of music, where you can hear very personal stories you can relate to in songs. There's just something different about folk that we know other young people will love if they give it a chance."

Jaymi's older brother, Alex Toole, joined on bass guitar during 2019. He is also a secondary school music teacher. In January 2020 they issued another EP, Cover My Eyes, and started their tour of east coast venues. The EP was produced at Hercules Studios by Wayne Connolly for Ditto Music. Women in Pop's Jess Richards felt, "[it] is a beguiling collection of five alt-folk tracks." Rod Yates of Brisbane Times observed, "Underneath the pastoral harmonies, lilting alt-folk and spirited singalongs lie some dark lyrical themes, particularly in the title track and its musings on mental health."

Due to COVID-19 restrictions they had been unable to tour for 18 months. They issued another single, "Florence's Town", in September 2020 via ABC Music. Unable to travel to the United Kingdom, they live-streamed the single launch of "Florence's Town", together with other tracks, from Damien Gerard Studios, Gosford in October. The live-stream included video collaborations with the Once and with Winterbourne. In December Little Quirks were signed to Downtown Music Publishing.

In December 2021 the line-up of Abbey, Jaymi and Mia started their The Rain Is Coming Tour, periodically including Alex. By that time their friend, Jordan Rouse had joined to provide electric guitar at some performances. In January 2022, due to another COVID-19 outbreak, they postponed their show in Dubbo to April. The group were featured vocalists on the Soul Movers' (see Murray Cook) rendition of Delaney & Bonnie's 1969 song "Groupie (Superstar)" (February 2022). The band appeared at South by Southwest, Texas in March.

They released a single, "The Rain", in March 2022. NME's Australian reviewer, Ellie Robinson, described it as "powerful" displaying an "emotive, ballad-esque run driven by coolly strummed acoustic guitars and bright piano chords." Its music video was directed by Tim Swallow. The group delivered their fourth EP, Call to Unknowns, in August 2022. Its six tracks includes the previous three singles, "Someone to Hold", "Florence's Town" and "The Rain". The EP was recorded and produced by Adam Toole at Grove Studios and at his home studio.

On 20 September 2024 the group issued their debut studio album, Little Quirks, on ABC Music. It was supported by an Australian tour in October–November. They followed by their fifth EP, The Beast, in September 2025, which was recorded at Sonora Studios with Jack Nigro producing. Although retaining their folk music base, the EP has "a tighter, punchier sound. There's still the shimmer of mandolin and harmony, but it's framed by a rawer edge."

== Members ==
=== Current members ===
- Abbey Toole – guitar, vocals (2015–present)
- Mia Toole – drums, vocals (2015–present)
- Lachlan Raeside – bass guitar (2026–present)
- Jordan Rouse – electric guitar (2021–present)

=== Former members ===
- Alex Toole – bass guitar (2019–2026)
- Jaymi Toole – mandolin, vocals (2015–2026)

== Discography ==
=== Studio albums ===
List of studio albums, with selected details
| Title | Details |
|---|---|
| Little Quirks | Released: 20 September 2024; Format: CD, digital; Label: Little Quirks, ABC (ABCM0037, 8856336) |

=== Extended plays ===
List of EPs, with selected details
| Title | Details |
|---|---|
| Where We Hide | Released: 21 October 2016; Format: digital; Label: Little Quirks |
| Suzie Knows | Released: 2 November 2017; Format: digital; Label: Little Quirks |
| Cover My Eyes | Released: 24 January 2020; Format: digital; Label: Little Quirks |
| Call to Unknowns | Released: 25 August 2022; Format: digital; Label: Little Quirks, Australian Broadcasting Corporation |
| The Beast | Released: 19 September 2025; Format: digital; Label: |

=== Singles ===
- "Crumbled" (2018)
- "I Told You So" (2018)
- "Life Wouldn't Be" (2019)
- "Florence's Town" (2020)
- "Someone to Hold" (2020)
- "The Rain" (2022)
- "Maybelle" (2022)
- "Storm Like Me" (2023)

== Awards and nominations ==
=== AIR Awards ===
The Australian Independent Record Awards (commonly known informally as AIR Awards) is an annual awards night to recognise, promote and celebrate the success of Australia's Independent Music sector.

| Year | Nominee / work | Award | Result | Ref. |
|---|---|---|---|---|
| 2023 | Call to Unknowns | Best Independent Blues and Roots Album or EP | Nominated | |
| 2025 | Little Quirks | Best Independent Blues and Roots Album or EP | Nominated | |
