= Whisper a Prayer =

Studio album by Mica Paris
- Released: 8 June 1993
- Recorded: 1992–1993
- Studios: Castle Oaks Studios (Calabasas, California); Lighthouse Recorders, NRG Studios and Devonshire Sound Studios (North Hollywood, California); Music Grinder Studios and Ocean Way Recording (Hollywood, California); Westlake Studios (Los Angeles, California); Mankind Studios (Encino, California); Tarpan Studios (San Rafael, California); The Enterprise (Burbank, California); Falconer Studios and Swanyard Studios (London, UK)
- Genres: R&B; soul
- Length: 63:25
- Label: 4th & B'way
- Producers: Narada Michael Walden; Mike Mani; Rod Temperton; Jon Lind; Mica Paris; Paul Johnson; Driza Bone

Mica Paris chronology
Contribution (1990)	Whisper a Prayer (1993)	Black Angel (1998)

Singles from Whisper a Prayer
- 1. "I Never Felt Like This Before" Released: 22 March 1993; 2. "I Wanna Hold On to You" Released: 24 May 1993; 3. "Two in a Million" Released: 26 July 1993; 4. "Whisper a Prayer" Released: 22 November 1993

Whisper a Prayer is the third studio album by British singer-songwriter Mica Paris. It was released on 8 June 1993 by 4th & B'way Records, her last for the label. Recording sessions for the album commenced in the spring of 1992 and concluded the following spring with Paris co-writing four of the twelve songs and producing one. Whisper a Prayer features writing and production from Narada Michael Walden, Rod Temperton and Terry Britten all of whom were top record producers at the time.

The album has received acclaim from critics who complimented the quality of the writing and production in addition to Paris' voice and delivery of the songs. The album was a moderate commercial success, bettering its predecessor Contribution on the UK Albums Chart, debuting at number 20. It was less successful in the US where it peaked at ninety-nine on the Top R&B/Hip-Hop Albums chart.

Four singles were released from the album, two of which were top 30 hits on the UK Singles Chart. Lead single "I Never Felt Like This Before" became Paris' highest appearance on the chart since her top 10 debut "My One Temptation", peaking at number 15. Second single from the album, "I Wanna Hold On to You" peaked at number 27 and was the highest charting in the US, reaching 46 on the Hot R&B/Hip-Hop Songs chart.

The Rod Temperton composition, "You Put a Move on My Heart", was covered and released by American recording artist Tamia and record producer Quincy Jones in 1995. Their version became a top 20 hit on the Hot R&B/Hip-Hop Songs chart.

== Background ==
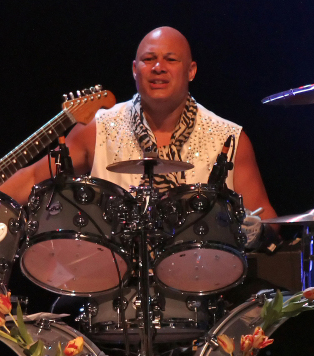
Narada Michael Walden (pictured) co-wrote and produced several songs on Whisper a Prayer.

Following Paris' BPI platinum-certified debut album, So Good and Silver-certified second, Contribution, Paris became a mother, pushing back the recording of her third album by two years. In Billboard, Larry Flick explained 'her pregnancy provided some of the creative focus needed to formulate what appears to be her long-desired commercial breakthrough.' In the same article, Paris is quoted:

"I think if you listened to my last album ['Contribution'], you will detect a little confusion, which was how I felt about my life and career, actually [...] There was so much mayhem; so much tugging and pulling. But there was something in the experience of having my daughter, and in being free to take the time to truly consider where my life was heading. It was so positive. It gave me the clarity to decide on the kind of album I wanted to make"

Flick noted that the inclusion of 'pop/urban hit machine' Narada Michael Walden, who wrote produced and co-wrote several songs with Paris, including the single "I Wanna Hold Onto You", may be viewed as 'commercially calculated' by 'diehard fans of the more dense jazz/dance tone of Paris' past efforts.' Paris asserted that the pair had a spiritual bond which made their collaboration work, saying, "Narada and I found a common ground to vibe on. He's taught me so much about the craft of making music." Walden expressed, "It was important that this album had some of the hard, soulful grit of my other records, but it also needed a clean quality that's accessible to a lot of people".

Prior to working with Paris, Walden had produced hits for Aretha Franklin ("Who's Zoomin' Who?"), Whitney Houston ("How Will I Know"), Clarence Clemons ("You're a Friend of Mine"), Dionne Warwick ("No One There (To Sing Me a Love Song)"), Gladys Knight ("Licence to Kill"), Regina Belle ("Baby Come to Me"), Lisa Fischer ("How Can I Ease the Pain") and Mariah Carey ("Vision of Love"). Further contributors include, Terry Britten, Rod Temperton and Jon Lind. Previously, Britten had won the Grammy Award for Song of the Year in 1985 for Tina Turner's "What's Love Got to Do with It" (which was later inducted into the Grammy Hall of Fame); Temperton penned the Michael Jackson hits "Rock with You", "Off the Wall" and "Thriller"; whilst Lind co-wrote Madonna's "Crazy for You" and Vanessa Williams's "Save the Best for Last", which both topped the US Hot 100, the latter being named "Song of the Year" by ASCAP in 1993.

== Reception ==
=== Critical response ===
Professional ratings
Review scores
Source	Rating
AllMusic	4/5 stars
Entertainment Weekly	A−
Select	2/5 medals

Whisper a Prayer has received general acclaim from critics. In a contemporary review by Entertainment Weekly, James Earl Hardy expressed, 'Mica Paris finally lives up to the sensation her debut single' and that 'Her breathy alto is equally as classy and confident with pop ("I Never Felt Like This Before") as it is with hip-hop soul ("You Got a Special Way") and sexy R&B ballads ("You Put a Move on My Heart")'. AllMusic editor, Andrew Hamilton listed "Positivity" and "Can't Seem to Make Up My Mind", both co-written by Paris, as "favorites", adding that "her original version of "You Put a Move on My Heart" sounds better than Tamia's version" featured on Quincy Jones' Jook Joint album. Hamilton also praised Paris' vocal performances, writing "she delivers these songs in her smooth, jazz- and blues-influenced, intense but relaxed style". In addition to this, Hamilton expressed that Paris "is the most exciting female vocalist to come along in some time" but noted that "unlike her first LP, which scored a minor R&B hit with "My One Temptation", none of these excellent songs made much of an impact".

In a retrospective review, BBC Music editor Daryl Easlea described Paris as "one of the UK’s greatest soul divas" and wrote that "working with what only could be deemed a stellar cast [...] Island looked at Whisper a Prayer as being Paris’ true breakthrough album". Easlea described the album as "a remarkable pedigree" thanks in part to "backing singers like Siedah Garrett, producers including Narada Michael Walden and Rod Temperton, and writers such as Graham Lyle on board". Easlea described "I Bless the Day" as "sweet and light, floating along with Paris’ emotive voice at once commanding and sensitive" and the "Drizabone-mixed swingbeat of Two in a Million" as "spry and sugary". However, Easlea wrote that "the only thing that lets the Whisper a Prayer down is its instrumentation". Using "You Put a Move on My Heart" as one such an example he wrote, "a song as beautiful and passionately delivered [...] you long for it being recorded at a different time, not with Paris in front of a keyboard with an orchestra setting button and a drum machine". He also noted the "90s contraptions [...] present and correct on the album’s opener, I Never Felt This Way Before", writing that "it may be ultra-smooth but the overall effect is like a cut-price version of a cut from Anita Baker's Rapture". In closing however, Easlea expressed 'Whisper a Prayer is one of the shining beacons of 90s UK soul'.

Andrew Hamilton also reviewed "You Put a Move on My Heart" favorably, writing "Mica Paris' original rendition of Rod Temperton's ballad supreme[...]shames Tamia's more successful rendition". Though he noted that the sales of Whisper a Prayer "pale in comparison" to Q's Jook Joint – on which Tamia's cover is featured – he wrote that "Paris' glorious tone, however, never pales; it glows like a warm fire as the devastating British woman squeezes the last drop of soul from the lyrics."

=== Commercial reception ===
Whisper a Prayer debuted and peaked at number 20 on the UK Albums Chart making it her second top 20 appearance on the chart. In its second week the album dropped one place to 21 and 30 in its third before making its last appearance on the chart at number 61 in its fourth week. By August 1993, the album had sold 15,000 copies in the UK, but was her best selling album in the US where it peaked at 99 on the Top R&B/Hip-Hop Albums chart — making it Paris' last album to appear on any Billboard chart.

== Singles ==
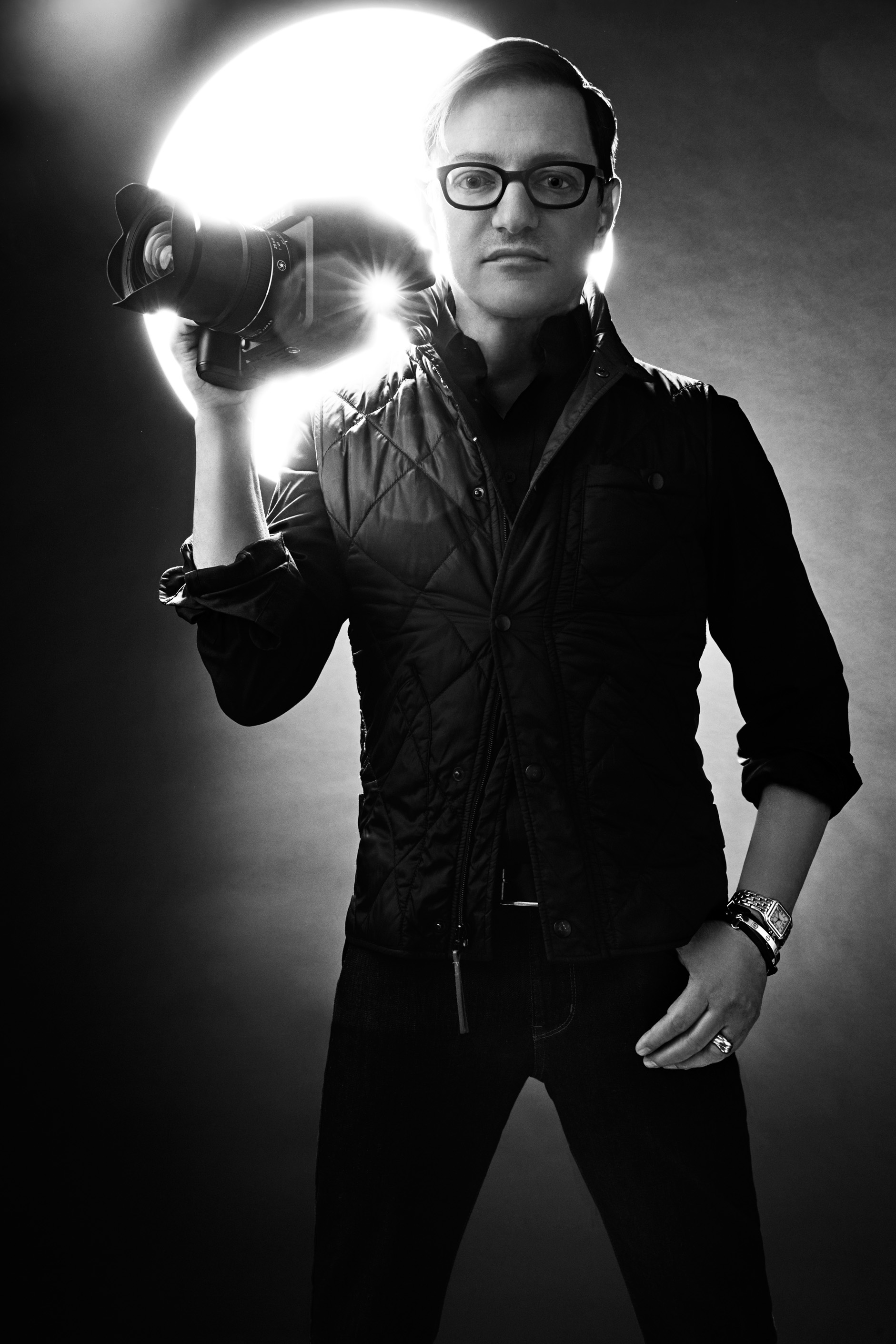
Matthew Rolston (pictured) directed the music video for "I Wanna Hold on to You".

Four singles were released from Whisper a Prayer, the first being the Narada Michael Walden production "I Never Felt Like This Before", written by Walden and Sally Jo Dakota. "I Never Felt Like This Before" debuted at number 23 on the UK Singles Chart, rising and peaking at number 15 in its second week, becoming Paris' third and last top twenty appearance on the chart after 1989's "Where is the Love" with Will Downing.

Walden also produced the second single, "I Wanna Hold on to You", which debuted and peaked at number 27 on the UK Singles Chart whilst in the US, it peaked at 46 on the Hot R&B/Hip-Hop Songs chart. A music video for "I Wanna Hold on to You" was directed by Matthew Rolston. Third and fourth singles "Two in a Million" and title track "Whisper a Prayer" were minor successes in the UK peaking at 51 and 65 respectively. "Whisper a Prayer" was also Paris' last charting single in the US, debuting and peaking at 22 on the Bubbling Under R&B/Hip-Hop Songs chart on October 23, 1993. "I Wanna Hold on to You" was sampled by 2Pac on "Nothing to Lose", posthumously released on the album R U Still Down? (Remember Me).

== Track listing ==
Whisper a Prayer track listing
No.	Title	Writer(s)	Producer(s)	Length
1.	"I Never Felt Like This Before"	Narada Michael Walden, Sally Jo Dakota	Narada Michael Walden, Mike Mani, Monty Seward	4:30
2.	"I Wanna Hold On to You"	Narada Michael Walden, Mica Paris, Sally Jo Dakota	Narada Michael Walden, Mike Mani	5:10
3.	"You Put a Move on My Heart"	Rod Temperton	Rod Temperton	6:06
4.	"We Were Made for Love"	Rod Temperton	Rod Temperton	4:50
5.	"Whisper a Prayer"	Jon Lind, Phil Galdston, Wendy Waldman	Jon Lind	5:50
6.	"Too Far Apart"	Narada Michael Walden, Mica Paris, Sally Jo Dakota	Narada Michael Walden, Louis Biancaniello	5:36
7.	"I Bless the Day"	Terry Britten, Graham Lyle	Mica Paris, Paul Johnson	4:50
8.	"Two in a Million"	Rod Temperton	Rod Temperton, Driza Bone	3:52
9.	"Positivity"	Narada Michael Walden, Mica Paris, Sylvester Jackson	Narada Michael Walden	5:14
10.	"Can't Seem to Make Up My Mind"	Narada Michael Walden, Mica Paris, Sally Jo Dakota	Narada Michael Walden	5:54
11.	"You Got a Special Way"	Narada Michael Walden, Mike Mani, Monty Seward, Deena Charles	Narada Michael Walden	5:22
12.	"Love Keeps Coming Back"	Rod Temperton	Rod Temperton	7:20
Total length:				63:25

== Personnel ==
Credits obtained from the album's liner notes.

- Mica Paris – lead vocals, backing vocals (2, 3, 6, 7, 9)
- Narada Michael Walden – keyboards (1), percussion (1), arrangements (1, 2, 6, 9–11), bass (10), percussion arrangements (10)
- Mike Mani – keyboards (1, 2, 9, 11), programming (1, 2, 9, 11)
- Monty Seward – keyboards (1, 9–11), programming (1, 9–11), synth strings (10)
- Erik Hanson – synthesizer programming (3, 4, 8, 12)
- John Andrew Schreiner – keyboards (5), acoustic guitar (5), bass (5), drum programming (5), arrangements (5)
- Phil Galdston – acoustic piano (5), arrangements (5)
- Louis Biancaniello – keyboards (6), programming (6)
- Howard Francis – keyboards (7)
- Larry Williams – electric piano (12)
- Vernon 'Ice' Black – guitars (2)
- Paul Jackson Jr. – guitars (3, 8, 12)
- Jakko Jakszyk – electric guitar (5)
- Randy Hope-Taylor – bass (7)
- Neil Stubenhaus – bass (12)
- Max Beesley – drums (7), percussion (7)
- John Robinson – drums (12)
- Alex Acuña – udu (5)
- Steve Williamson – saxophone (7)
- Camille Henry – angel sounds (4)
- Sid Page – first violin (5)
- Rod Temperton – arrangements (3, 4, 8, 12)
- Jon Lind – arrangements (5)
- David Campbell – string arrangements and conductor (5)
- Frank Martin – string arrangements and conductor (9), keyboards (10), programming (10)
- Suzie Katayama – string contractor (5)
- Kitty Beethoven – backing vocals (1, 9–11)
- Nicole Bradin – backing vocals (1, 11)
- Sandy Griffith – backing vocals (1, 9, 11)
- Tony Lindsay – backing vocals (1, 10, 11)
- Claytoven Richardson – backing vocals (1, 9, 11)
- Nadirah Ali – backing vocals (3, 4, 8, 12)
- Siedah Garrett – backing vocals (3, 8, 12)
- Debra Parson – backing vocals (4)
- Jennifer Caryn – backing vocals (6)
- Laurie 'Flame' Jones – backing vocals (6)
- Paul Johnson – backing vocals (7)
- Nikita Germaine – backing vocals (9–12)
- Skyler Jett – backing vocals (9)
- J.D. Nicholas – backing vocals (12)

=== Production ===
- Julian Palmer – executive producer
- Mica Paris – executive producer
- Narada Michael Walden – producer (1, 2, 6, 9–11)
- Mike Mani – associate producer (1), co-producer (2)
- Monty Seward – associate producer (1)
- Rod Temperton – producer (3, 4, 8, 12)
- Erik Hanson – associate producer (3, 4, 8, 12)
- Jon Lind – producer (5)
- Louis Biancaniello – co-producer (6)
- Paul Johnson – co-producer (7)
- Driza Bone – additional production (8)
- Janice Lee, Kelly McRae, Stefani Shaffer, Cynthia Shiloh and Kevin Walden – production coordination (1, 2, 6, 9–11)
- Camille Henry – production coordinator (3, 4)
- Laura Flores – production coordinator (8, 12)
- Michael Nash – design
- Katerina Jebb – photography
- Pat Barry – US packaging development

Technical

- Bernie Grundman – mastering at Bernie Grundman Mastering (Hollywood, California)
- Eric Reyburn – recording (1, 2, 6, 9–11)
- David Frazer – vocal recording (1, 2, 6, 9–11), mixing (1, 2, 6, 9–11)
- Eric Rudd – recording (3), engineer (4), assistant engineer (12)
- Mick Guzauski – mix engineer (3, 8, 12), mixing (5)
- Tommy Vicari – mix engineer (4), recording (8, 12)
- Guy DeFazio – engineer (4)
- Marc DeSisto – recording (5)
- Nick Wollage – engineer (7)
- Martin Russell – mix engineer (7)
- Moogie Canazio – recording (8, 12)
- Daren Klein – recording (8)
- Driza Bone – remixing (8)
- Matt Forger – recording (12)
- Jeff Gray – assistant engineer (1, 2, 6, 9–11)
- Michael Aarvold – assistant engineer (3, 4, 8, 12)
- Christopher Zerbe – assistant engineer (3, 4)
- Daniel Clements – assistant engineer (4)
- Dave Hecht – assistant engineer (4)
- David Harrelson – assistant engineer (8, 12)
- Greg Loskorn – assistant engineer (8)
- John Malta – assistant engineer (8, 12)
- Paul Scriver – assistant engineer (8, 12)
- Tina Madison – assistant engineer (12)
- Philip Reynolds – assistant engineer (12)
- Kevin Becka – assistant mix engineer (3)
- Eric Fitzgerald – assistant mix engineer (3, 4)
- Stephen Harrison – assistant mix engineer (3, 8, 12)
- Gabriel Sutter – assistant mix engineer (4)
- Mike Mani – additional engineer (1, 11)
- Louis Biancaniello – additional engineer (6)

== Charts ==
Chart performance for Whisper a Prayer
Chart (1993)	Peak position
Australian Albums (ARIA)	225
UK Albums (Official Charts)	20
US Top R&B/Hip-Hop Albums (Billboard)	99
