= OPAZ =

Opaz or OPAZ may refer to:

- Public Authority for Special Economic Zones and Free Zones (OPAZ), government body in Oman
- Opaz, character in 2003 French-Canadian film Kaena: The Prophecy
- Opaz junction on Ontario Northland Railway, Canada
- Opaz studio, recording studio in London used by The Quakes
- Opaz Turkish music ensemble with whom Charlie Cawood performs
- Opaz Back from the Raggedy Edges, 1994 album featuring Mica Paris
