= Like Dreamers Do (Mica Paris song) =

1988 single by Mica Paris

Single by Mica Paris

from the album So Good
- Released: 1988
- Genre: Funk; soul
- Length: 4:18
- Label: 4th & B'way Records; Island Records
- Producer: L'Equipe

Mica Paris singles chronology
"My One Temptation" (1988)	"Like Dreamers Do" (1988)	"Breathe Life into Me" (1988)

"Like Dreamers Do" is a song by British singer Mica Paris which features jazz musician Courtney Pine. It was released as the second single from Paris' debut album, So Good (1988), by 4th & B'way Records. The song peaked at number 26 on the UK Singles Chart.

== Critical reception ==
Pan-European magazine Music & Media described "Like Dreamers Do" as a "mid-tempo jazzy single from this promising young singer". David Quantick from NME said "...this somewhat is not 'One Temptation' although it would do me if the weather was better. Time to wait for the album." James Hamilton from Record Mirror wrote in his dance column, "Huskily and quite jazzily sung tumbling and tapping 119 2/3bpm breezy swinger featuring Courtney Pine's squealing sax and some gospel-ish insistently repetitive title line chorus support".

== Track listing ==
- 7" vinyl

A. "Like Dreamers Do"
B. "Wicked"

- 12" vinyl

A. "Like Dreamers Do" (The Freeway Mix)
B1. "Like Dreamers Do"
B2. "Wicked"

- CD single
1. "Like Dreamers Do" (Radio Mix)
2. "Like Dreamers Do" (The Freeway Mix)
3. "Like Dreamers Do" (The Rebirth of Cool Mix)
4. "Wicked"

== Charts ==
Chart (1988)	Peak position
UK Singles (OCC)	26
