= I Wanna Hold On to You =

1993 single by Mica Paris

Single by Mica Paris

from the album Whisper a Prayer
- B-side: "Say You Will"
- Released: 24 May 1993
- Studio: Tarpan (San Rafael, California)
- Length: 4:16
- Label: 4th & B'way
- Songwriters: Narada Michael Walden; Mica Paris; Sally Jo Dakota
- Producers: Narada Michael Walden; Mike Mani

Mica Paris singles chronology
"I Never Felt Like This Before" (1993)	"I Wanna Hold On to You" (1993)	"Two in a Million" (1993)

Music video
- "I Wanna Hold on to You" on YouTube

"I Wanna Hold on to You" is a song by British singer-songwriter Mica Paris, released in May 1993 by 4th & B'way as the second single from her third studio album, Whisper a Prayer (1993). Co-written by Paris with Narada Michael Walden and Sally Jo Dakota, it peaked at number 27 on the UK Singles Chart and number five on Music Week's Dance Singles chart. A music video was produced to promote the single, directed by American artist, photographer, director and creative director Matthew Rolston. It was later made available by VEVO on YouTube in 2018.

== Critical reception ==
In his weekly UK chart commentary, James Masterton described the song as a "fairly standard piece of Brit soul". Alan Jones from Music Week felt that after the massive "I Never Felt Like This Before", "Mica Paris tackles a less flowing, looser and altogether jazzier song. Vocally superb, but lacking the commercial appeal of the aforementioned single, "I Wanna Hold On to You" is likely to peter out a good 10 or so places lower." Ian McCann from NME wrote, "Standard understated and impossibly unimaginative soul groove." James Hamilton from the Record Mirror Dance Update described it as "EnVogue-ish" and "slinky". Damon Albarn and Alex James of Blur reviewed the song for Smash Hits, giving it five out of five. Albarn said that "she definitely sounds more and more like Anita Baker the more records she puts out." He added, "Mica is a really sexy woman, it's sexy music. It gives me the horn. It's energetic and sexy."

== Track listings ==
European CD

No.	Title	Writer(s)	Producer(s)	Length
1.	"I Wanna Hold On to You" (Absolute radio mix)	Narada Michael Walden, Mica Paris, Sally Jo Dakota	Absolute	3:49
2.	"I Wanna Hold On to You" (album version edit)	Narada Michael Walden, Mica Paris, Sally Jo Dakota	Narada Michael Walden, Mike Mani	4:16
3.	"I Wanna Hold On to You" (old school mix)	Narada Michael Walden, Mica Paris, Sally Jo Dakota	S & P Jervier	5:24
4.	"Say You Will"		Mica Paris	5:10

UK 12-inch

Side one
No.	Title	Writer(s)	Producer(s)	Length
1.	"I Wanna Hold On to You" (Absolute club mix)	Narada Michael Walden, Mica Paris, Sally Jo Dakota	Absolute
2.	"I Wanna Hold On to You" (album mix)	Narada Michael Walden, Mica Paris, Sally Jo Dakota	Narada Michael Walden, Mike Mani	4:16

Side two
No.	Title	Writer(s)	Producer(s)	Length
1.	"I Wanna Hold On to You" (Dirty Drum mix)	Narada Michael Walden, Mica Paris, Sally Jo Dakota	S & P Jervier
2.	"Say You Will"		Mica Paris	5:10

US

All tracks are written by Narada Michael Walden, Mica Paris, Sally Jo Dakota.

Side one
No.	Title	Producer(s)	Length
1.	"I Wanna Hold On to You" (album mix)	Narada Michael Walden, Mike Mani	4:16
2.	"I Wanna Hold On to You" (Dirty Drum mix)	S & P Jervier

Side two
No.	Title	Producer(s)	Length
1.	"I Wanna Hold On to You" (Absolute remix)	Absolute
2.	"I Wanna Hold On to You" (Absolute instrumental)	Absolute

Netherlands 7-inch

Side one
No.	Title	Writer(s)	Producer(s)	Length
1.	"I Wanna Hold On to You" (Absolute radio mix)	Narada Michael Walden, Mica Paris, Sally Jo Dakota	Absolute

Side two
No.	Title	Writer(s)	Producer(s)	Length
1.	"Say You Will"	Phil Edwards	Mica Paris	5:10

== Personnel ==
Personnel are obtained from the Whisper a Prayer liner notes.

Performance credits

- Lead vocals – Mica Paris
- Background vocals – Mica Paris

Instruments

- Guitar – Vernon 'Ice' Black
- Keyboards – Mike Mani
- Bass synth – Narada Michael Walden

Technical and production

- Arrangement – Narada Michael Walden
- Songwriters – Narada Michael Walden, Sally Jo Dakota, Mica Paris
- Engineering – Marc 'Elvis' Reyburn
- Engineering assistants – Jeff 'G' Gray
- Mastering – Bernie Grundman
- Mixing – David 'Frazeman' Frazer
- Production – Narada Michael Walden, Mike Mani
- Programming – Mike Mani

== Charts ==
Chart (1993)	Peak position
Europe (Eurochart Hot 100)	83
Europe (European Dance Radio)	2
UK Singles (Official Charts)	27
UK Airplay (Music Week)	39
UK Dance (Music Week)	5
UK Club Chart (Music Week)	11
US Hot R&B/Hip-Hop Songs (Billboard)	46
US R&B/Hip-Hop Airplay (Billboard)	54
