= Gospel (Mica Paris album) =

Studio album by Mica Paris
- Released: December 4, 2020
- Genre: Gospel; soul
- Length: 42:00
- Label: East West, Warner

Mica Paris chronology
Born Again (2009)	Gospel (2020)

Singles from Whisper a Prayer
- 1. "Mamma Said" Released: 2020; 2. "(Something Inside) So Strong" Released: 2020; 3. "Take My Hand, Oh Precious Lord (with Jools Holland)" Released: 2020; 4. "Amazing Grace" Released: 2020

Gospel is the eighth studio album by British singer-songwriter Mica Paris. It was released on December 4, 2020, by Warner subsidiary East West Records. Gospel is Paris' first album since Born Again (2009).

== Background ==
On July 31, 2020, the BBC broadcast Gospel According To Mica - The Story Of Gospel Music In Six Songs, in which Mica Paris explored the origins of the gospel songs she sang in childhood growing up in Lewisham, south London and her decision to leave the church to sing secular music and record pop/soul hits such as the UK top 10 "My One Temptation", from her Platinum-certified debut album So Good (1988). In the documentary Paris recounts her history with gospel music, the backlash she faced in transitioning to secular music and the similar experiences of her contemporaries. Additionally, she meets the Fisk University choir in Tennessee who sang for Queen Victoria and sings with The Kingdom Choir who sang at the wedding of Prince Harry and Meghan Markle. Paris also explores the history of gospel music used as communication by the slavery freedom fighters, the tragedies experienced by Thomas A. Dorsey and Sam Cooke after leaving the church and contemporary artists such as Stormzy, who merged secular and gospel music during his headline Glastonbury 2019 set performing "Blinded by Your Grace, Pt. 2".

Gospel, described as a 'passion project for Mica' was inspired by Gospel According To Mica - The Story Of Gospel Music In Six Songs. Following the success of the documentary, Paris began recording the album with the Soul Sanctuary Gospel Choir. Paris expressed:

"Recording this album has been a watershed moment in my life. My life over the last 32 years has been one of triumphs and challenges. Going back to my gospel roots has given me hope and faith at a time we all need it and I hope others will feel the same. Last year I was so inspired to see artists like Stormzy make Gospel music current again. My recent documentary the ‘Gospel According to Mica’ for the BBC was a game changer for me. I realised my voice had matured and the pain of my struggles added a new strength. Today we all face challenges like we’ve never had before and faith in the future will help us all through this and I hope my album will inspire people to have hope. As my grandmother always told me ‘don’t worry, prayer changes everything’ and she was right [...] In these uncertain times it’s the power of music that will get us through this. Some of the best songs in life have brought me through the toughest periods of isolation. This album has been my favourite to record. It’s 12 tracks, two of which are originals, I have recorded with ‘Sanctuary Soul Gospel Choir’, who are amazing. I hope people will be uplifted as I am from this album. When I sing, I feel free and have hope"

== Reception ==
Professional ratings
Review scores
Source	Rating
JubileeCast	5/5 stars

On December 7, 2020 Gospel first appeared at number 27 on the midweek UK Albums Chart, before officially debuting at number 43 on 11 December 2020, making it her highest appearance since Whisper a Prayer (1993). Gospel also topped the UK Hip Hop and R&B Albums Chart in its first week of release before slipping to number 3 in its second and number 5 in its third week. In its fourth consecutive week in the top 5, Gospel rose to number 4 on the UK Hip Hop and R&B Albums Chart Chart, where it returned to in its sixth week after a dip to number 34 in its fifth week in the top 40. Gospel re-entered the top 5 of the UK Hip Hop and R&B Albums Chart on 29 January 2021. The album has spent a total of 12 weeks in the top 40 of the UK Hip Hop and R&B Albums Chart, re-entering at number 22 in its last week.

== Singles ==
Four singles were released from Gospel, the first being original song "Mamma Said", inspired by Paris' grandmother. Paris explained, "My grandparents taught me the meaning of life. They were the Windrush generation that encompassed what hard work was. My grandmother was really my first agent. She took me to sing in every church in the UK from the age of 9 and soon I was winning singing competitions. This led me to make soul music and achieve worldwide success." "Mamma Said" was followed by Labi Siffre’s "(Something Inside) So Strong", Rev. Thomas A. Dorsey's "Take My Hand, Oh Precious Lord" and the John Newton hymn "Amazing Grace".

== Track listing ==
Gospel track listing
No.	Title	Writer(s)	Length
1.	"(Something Inside) So Strong"	Labi Siffre	4:18
2.	"Mamma Said"	Patrick Mascall, Paul Barry	3:32
3.	"Amazing Grace"	John Newton	3:29
4.	"Oh Happy Day"	Edwin Hawkins	3:34
5.	"Take My Hand, Oh Precious Lord" (with Jools Holland)	Thomas Dorsey	3:02
6.	"The Struggle"	Dee Adam, Mica Paris	3:16
7.	"I Still Haven't Found What I'm Looking For"	Adam Clayton, David Evans, Laurence Mullen, Paul David Hewson	3:55
8.	"Motherless Child"	Traditional	2:53
9.	"Human"	Jamie Hartman, Nick Monson, Rory Graham	3:31
10.	"Go Down Moses"	Traditional	2:19
11.	"I Want to Know What Love Is"	Mick Jones	4:30
12.	"A Change Is Gonna Come"	Sam Cooke	3:21
Total length:			42:00

== Charts ==
Chart performance for Gospel
Chart (2020)	Peak position
UK Albums (OCC)	43
UK R&B Albums (OCC)	1
