= Breathe Life into Me =

1988 single by Mica Paris

Single by Mica Paris

from the album So Good
- Released: 1988
- Genre: R&B, soul
- Length: 4:06
- Label: 4th & Broadway
- Songwriters: Mick Leesome and Peter Vale
- Producer: L'Equipe

Mica Paris singles chronology
"Like Dreamers Do" (1988)	"Breathe Life into Me" (1988)	"Where Is the Love" (1988)

"Breathe Life into Me" is a song by British singer Mica Paris. It was released as the third single from her debut album So Good by 4th & B'way Records and became her third consecutive top-thirty hit in the UK. The song was originally sung by American CCM singer Russ Taff from his 1987 self-titled album.

== Reception ==
Debuting at number sixty-nine on the UK singles chart, "Breathe Life into Me" rose steadily, reaching the top forty in its fourth week and peaking at number twenty-six in its seventh week. "Breathe Life into Me" accumulated a total of 11 weeks on the chart. In the US, the song was Paris' second appearance on the US R&B/Hip-Hop Songs chart, where it peaked at number twenty-four.

== Track listing ==
12" vinyl
Side one

1. "Breathe Life into Me (Extended Remix)"

Side two

1. "Breathe Life into Me (Radio Mix)"
2. "In the City"

CD single

1. "Breathe Life into Me (Radio Remix)"
2. "Breathe Life into Me (Extended Remix)"
3. "In The City"
4. "Like Dreamers Do (Hello New York)"

== Charts ==
Chart (1988–1989)	Peak position
Netherlands (Single Top 100)	72
UK Singles (OCC)	26
US Hot R&B/Hip-Hop Songs (Billboard)	24
