= Black Angel (album) =

Studio album by Mica Paris
- Released: 10 August 1998
- Recorded: 1996–1998
- Studio: Jam Shack Recordings; Eden Studios; Blah Street Studios; Roundhouse Studios; Marcus Studios; The Green Room
- Genre: R&B; pop
- Length: 59:24
- Label: Cooltempo; Chrysalis
- Producer: Richie Stevens; Stephen Simmonds; Julian Jackson; Mica Paris; Boy George; Guy Farley; Omar

Mica Paris chronology
Whisper a Prayer (1991)	Black Angel (1998)	The Best of Mica Paris (1999)

Singles from Black Angel
- 1. "Stay" Released: 11 May 1998; 2. "Carefree" Released: 3 August 1998; 3. "Black Angel" Released: 14 November 1998

Professional ratings
Review scores
Source	Rating
The Guardian	2/5 stars

Black Angel is the fourth studio album by British singer-songwriter Mica Paris. It was released on 10 August 1998 by Cooltempo / Chrysalis, her first and last for these labels, and features production from Boy George and Raphael Saadiq.

== Recording ==
In the book, Straight, Boy George expressed, 'I wrote and produced "Black Angel" for Brit soul diva Mica Paris. Working with such a soaring voice — which could reach notes I could only dream of — was a thrilling experience.'

== Reception ==
=== Critical ===
Reviewing the single "Carefree" for Billboard, Larry Flick wrote, "Carefree" 'shows the enduring chanteuse in tip-top vocal form, floating a glorious, deceptively simple performance over a deliciously soulful groove. Equally appropriate for club turntables and home sound systems, this Cooltempo U.K. release leaves you desperate for a full-length album.' In the book Companion to Contemporary Black British Culture, Derek A. Bardowell heralded Paris as 'UK R'n'B's most respected vocalist. Despite struggling to find a market to fit her raspy but classically soulful voice, Paris has been a major musical force'. Bardowell also wrote that 'Paris found musical liberation in 1998 and assumed more creative control on her fourth effort [...] Black Angel is the greatest illustration of Paris' innovative talent.

=== Commercial ===
Black Angel debuted and peaked at number fifty-nine on the UK Albums Chart making it Paris' first album to miss out on a place in the UK Top 40. The album only charted for one week, meaning it failed to live up to the sales of her previous three studio albums. Black Angel was Paris' last album to chart in the UK until Gospel in 2020.

== Singles ==
Three singles were released from Black Angel. The lead single, "Stay", fared poorly in the charts, especially for a lead single from an album, entering and peaking at number forty then falling to number seventy-two the next week before dropping out of the charts completely. The second single from the album, "Carefree", performed worse than the previous release and became Paris' first single to fail to chart within the UK Top 200. The third and final single to be released from the album was the title track, "Black Angel". This performed better than the previous single, however it only managed to chart at number seventy-two, before falling off the charts the following week. This was Mica's last single to chart in the UK to date.

== Track listing ==
No.	Title	Writer(s)	Length
1.	"Interlude"	Gerry Brown; Nicholas Moroch	1:49
2.	"Stay"	Sylvester Stewart	4:21
3.	"Is It Good Enough?"	Mica Paris; Julian Jackson; Alex Turnbull; Johnny Turnbull	5:12
4.	"Carefree"	Paris; A. Turnbull; J. Turnbull; William Clark; Willie Hale	4:13
5.	"Let Me Inside"	Stephen Simmonds	3:55
6.	"Black Angel"	John Themis; George O'Dowd	5:33
7.	"Perfect"	Paris; C. Samuel; Bob Marley	4:37
8.	"Hate to Love"	Simmonds	4:27
9.	"Waiting"	Paris; Samuel	4:09
10.	"I'll Give You More"	Paris; Samuel	4:29
11.	"Love's Gone"	Jackson; James Ingram	5:18
12.	"Don't Say Goodnight"	Ernie Isley; Marvin Isley; Chris Jasper; Ronald Isley; O'Kelly Isley Jr.; Rudolph Isley	7:01
13.	"Baby Angel"	Guy Farley; Tony McAnaney	4:20
14.	"I Should've Known Better"	Omar Hammer; Paris	5:05
Total length:			59:24

Notes:

- Track 4 contains a sample from "Let the Good Times Roll" by Little Beaver
- Track 7 contains a sample from "Could You Be Loved" by Bob Marley and the Wailers

== Personnel ==
Credits adapted from the album's information on AllMusic and the liner notes.

Managerial

- Executive producers – Mica Paris

Visuals and Imagery

- Design – Ian Ross
- Photography – Regan Cameron, Jamie Morgan
- Video image – Zoe Broach
- Calligraphy – Ruth Rowland

Performance credits

- Lead vocals – Mica Paris
- Background vocals – Mica Paris, Chris Ballin, Jackie Farris, Jackie Gouche, James Ingram, Julian Jackson, Yana Johnson, Marva King, Jackie Simley, Stephen Simmonds, Alisha Warren

Instruments

- Bass – Boy George, Nick Hannan, Raphael Saadiq, Stuart Zender
- Drums – Dodge, Julian Jackson, John Paris
- Flugelhorn – Colin Graham
- Flute – Chris Margary,
- Guitar – Kevan Frost, Randy Hope-Taylor, John Themis
- Keyboards – Peter Adams, Julian Jackson, Paul Johnson, Kojo
- Percussion – Julian Jackson
- Piano – Marcus Brown, James Ingram, Wayne Linsey,
- Saxophone – Ben Castle, Chris Margary, Jay Work
- Recorder – Gareth Lucking, Jummy Sloan
- Trombone – Skip Waring
- Trumpet – Raul d'Oliveira, Colin Graham, Skip Waring

Technical and production

- Arrangement – Mica Paris, Richard Hewson (strings), Julian Jackson (guitar)
- Engineering – Nick Hannan, Alan Jenkins, Avril MacKintosh, Bill Malina,
- Engineering assistants – Paul Naguna
- Mixing – Marcus Brown, Guy Farley,
- Record producer – Boy George, Guy Farley, Richie Stevens, Stephen Simmonds, Julian Jackson, Mica Paris, Omar
- Programming – Marcus Brown, Julian Jackson, Richie Stevens
- Recorded at Jam Shack Recordings, Los Angeles; Eden Studios, London; Blah Street Studios, Hampshire; Roundhouse Studios, London; Marcus Studios, London; The Green Room

== Charts ==
Chart (1998)	Peak position
UK Albums (OCC)	59
UK R&B Albums (OCC)	10
