= Modern Day Jazz Stories =

Studio album by Courtney Pine
- Released: 1995
- Genre: Jazz
- Length: 59:03
- Label: Verve
- Producer: Courtney Pine, Eric Calvi

Courtney Pine chronology
To The Eyes of Creation (1992)	Modern Day Jazz Stories (1995)	Underground (1997)

Modern Day Jazz Stories is a 1995 album by English saxophonist Courtney Pine. The album was nominated for the Mercury Music Prize in 1996. The album also helped Pine win a Music of Black Origin Award for best jazz act.

== Track listing ==
All tracks composed and arranged by Courtney Pine; except where noted.

1. "Prelude – The Water of Life"
2. "The 37th Chamber"
3. "Don't 'Xplain" (Billie Holiday)
4. "Dah Blessing"
5. "In the Garden of Eden (Thinking Inside of You)" (Stanley Clarke)
6. "Creation Stepper"
7. "After the Damaja"
8. "Absolution"
9. "Each One (Must) Teach One"
10. "The Unknown Warrior (Song for My Forefathers)"
11. "I've Known Rivers" (Gary Bartz)
12. "Outro – Guiding Light"
13. "Prince of Peace"
