= Born Again (Mica Paris album) =

Studio album by Mica Paris
- Released: 1 June 2009
- Label: Rhythm Riders
- Producer: Brian Rawling; Paul Meehan

Mica Paris chronology
Soul Classics (2005)	Born Again (2009)	Gospel (2020)

Born Again is the seventh studio album by British singer Mica Paris, released on 1 June 2009.

== Critical reception ==
In a review of the album for AllMusic, Jon O'Brien wrote that "the several cover versions are where Paris' engaging and controlled vocals really shine through", and that the "stripped-back acoustic performance" of "My One Temptation"—the original 1988 version being her biggest hit single—was "pleasant enough, but slightly unnecessary". He described the album as containing "the same kind of retro-influenced soul [Paris has] produced over the last 20 years", concluding that "even though it won't catapult her into the stratosphere, it still cements her reputation as one of the U.K.'s most underrated and gifted soul vocalists.

L. Michael Gipson, writing for SoulTracks, opined that with Born Again, "we have an elasticity and wealth to Paris’s voice and production that has been missing under the stead of previous producers", going on to suggest that "The primary difference from this effort and the five or so albums that came before is that someone finally paired Mica with material worthy of her; songs she could effortlessly interpret in ways full, experienced and moving."

== Track listing ==
No.	Title	Writer(s)	Length
1.	"Baby Come Back Now"	Paul Barry; Mark Taylor; James Morrison	3:47
2.	"You're the Only One"	Eric Benét; George Tyree Jr. Nash; Demonté Posey	3:56
3.	"Born Again"	Barry	3:55
4.	"Breathless"	Carl Sturken; Evan Rogers	3:29
5.	"Hold On"	Paul Meehan; Ayak Thiik; Maria Lawson	3:23
6.	"I Remember"	Keyshia Cole; Greg Curtis	3:44
7.	"The Hardest Thing"	Barry; Adam Phillips	3:49
8.	"Nothing But the Truth"	Meehan; Tim Woodcock; Ben Mills	4:08
9.	"Tonight"	Thiik; Graham Stack	3:46
10.	"Stay"	Meehan; Thiik	4:20
11.	"My One Temptation" (re-recording)	Mike Leeson; Peter Vale; Miles Waters	4:34
12.	"Summertime" (live)	George Gershwin; DuBose Heyward	3:49

== Personnel ==
Adapted from the album's liner notes.

Musicians

- Mica Paris – vocals, backing vocals
- Lorraine McIntosh – backing vocals
- Cliff Masterson – string arrangements (track 2)
- Perry Montague-Mason – strings leader (track 2)
- Pino Palladino – bass guitar (tracks 5, 8, 10)
- Adam Phillips – guitars
- Mark Read – piano (tracks 5, 8, 10)
- Ian Thomas – drums (tracks 5, 8, 10)

Technical

- Brian Rawling – producer
- Paul Meehan – producer, programming
- Dick Beetham – mastering
- Matt Furmidge – mixing
- Philip Rose – band engineering
- Version – design
- Kate Martin – photography
- Darren Knight – styling
- Wai Kan – hair & make-up
