= Camus Celli =

American songwriter, record producer and entrepreneur

- Education: Berklee College of Music
- Occupations: Songwriter, record producer

Camus Celli is an American songwriter, record producer and entrepreneur born in Savannah, Georgia. He studied composition and production at Berklee College of Music before moving to New York to work as a freelance programmer for such music legends as Nile Rodgers and Keith Diamond.

== Career ==
After Writing and Producing UK soul sensation Mica Paris' 1991 second album Contribution album with Andres Levin, Celli signed his first publishing deal with Virgin Music and was later signed to EMI Publishing.

In 2003 Camus developed singer songwriter Gavin DeGraw culminating in a deal with J Records, Gavin's first record Chariot went on to sell one million copies and earned platinum certification. In 2009 Camus produced and mixed Gavin's Free

In 2008 Camus launched Vel Records to provide an incubator for artists that included management, marketing, publishing, as well as songwriting and production. The first signing to VEL was a joint venture with Clive Davis on his J Records Label. Current signings include the Birmingham, UK indie rock band DELUKA.

Camus has recently begun consulting for Dr. Luke's Kemosabe Records bringing Portland, Oregon singer/songwriter Christian Burghardt into the Kemosabe roster.

== Selected discography ==
- 2AM Club - What did you think was going to happen
- Gavin DeGraw - Free
- Deluka - You Are the Night

== Articles ==
- The Sonics Are Taking Over: New Paths In Pop Songwriting
- MIX MAGAZINE
- Birmingham To Brooklyn: Deluka Makes Debut In DUMBO
