= Underground (Courtney Pine album) =

Studio album by Courtney Pine
- Released: 1997
- Recorded: March 17–21 and 23–28, 1997
- Genre: Jazz, fusion jazz, jazz rap
- Length: 66:02
- Label: Verve
- Producer: Courtney Pine, DJ Pogo, Sparki

Courtney Pine chronology
| Modern Day Jazz Stories (1995) | Underground (1997) | Another Story (1998) |

Professional ratings
Review scores
| Source | Rating |
|---|---|
| The Penguin Guide to Jazz Recordings | 3/4 stars |

Underground is a 1997 album by the English saxophonist Courtney Pine. It was released on the Verve label. It features elements of hip-hop integrated with jazz.

== Track listing ==
All tracks composed and arranged by Courtney Pine

1. "Intro – Inhale"
2. "Modern Day Jazz"
3. "Tryin' Times"
4. "Oneness of Mind"
5. "Invisible (Higher Vibe)"
6. "Book of ... (The Dead)"
7. "Children of the Sun"
8. "The In-Sense Song"
9. "Silver Surfer"
10. "Underground"
11. "Outro – Xhale"
12. "Save the Children"

== Personnel ==
- Courtney Pine – Soprano & Tenor Saxophone, Bass Clarinet and Flutes
- Cyrus Chestnut – Acoustic Piano, Hammond B3 Organ and Wurlitzer Electric Piano
- Reginald Veal – Double Bass
- Jeff "Tain" Watts – Drums
- DJ Pogo – Turntable
- Jhelisa – Vocals
- Nicholas Payton – Trumpet
- Mark Whitfield – Guitar
