= Contribution (song) =

1990 single by Rakim and Mica Paris

Single by Mica Paris featuring Rakim

from the album Contribution
- Released: 24 September 1990
- Genre: R&B, hip hop
- Label: 4th & B'way
- Songwriters: Andres Levin, Camus Celli, Marga Roman, Michele Vice
- Producers: Andres Levin, Camus Celli

Mica Paris featuring Rakim singles chronology
"Where Is the Love" (1990)	"Contribution" (1990)	"South of the River" (1990)

"Contribution" is a song by British singer-songwriter Mica Paris featuring American rapper Rakim. it was released as the lead single from her second studio album Contribution in 1990.

== Track listing ==
CD single
No.	Title	Lyrics	Producer	Length
1.	"Contribution" (Transistor Mix)	Andres Levin, Camus Celli, Marga Roman, Michele Vice	Dancin' Danny D	4:00
2.	"Showers of Love"	Mica Paris, Paul Armstrong, Will Johnson	Mica Paris	4:08

Maxi-single
No.	Title	Lyrics	Producer	Length
1.	"Contribution" (Original Edit)	Andres Levin, Camus Celli, Marga Roman, Michele Vice	Dancin' Danny D
2.	"Contribution" (Transistor Mix)	Andres Levin, Camus Celli, Marga Roman, Michele Vice	Dancin' Danny D
3.	"Contribution" (The Revolution Remix)	Andres Levin, Camus Celli, Marga Roman, Michele Vice	Dancin' Danny D
4.	"Showers of Love" (Extended Mix)	Mica Paris, Paul Armstrong, Will Johnson	Ultimatum

7" vinyl

Side one
No.	Title	Lyrics	Producer	Length
1.	"Contribution" (Transistor Mix)	Andres Levin, Camus Celli, Marga Roman, Michele Vice	Dancin' Danny D	4:08

Side two
No.	Title	Lyrics	Producer	Length
2.	"Showers of Love"	Mica Paris, Paul Armstrong, Will Johnson	Mica Paris	3:21

12" vinyl

Side one
No.	Title	Lyrics	Length
1.	"Contribution" (Make a Stand Mix)	Andres Levin, Camus Celli, Marga Roman, Michele Vice
2.	"Contribution" (Make a Stand Mix Instrumental)	Andres Levin, Camus Celli, Marga Roman, Michele Vice

Side two
No.	Title	Lyrics	Producer	Length
3.	"Contribution" (Original Edit)	Andres Levin, Camus Celli, Marga Roman, Michele Vice
4.	"Contribution" (Acapella)	Andres Levin, Camus Celli, Marga Roman, Michele Vice	Ultimatum

== Charts ==
Chart performance for "Contribution"
Chart (1990)	Peak position
Australia (ARIA)	184
Europe (Eurochart Hot 100)	91
UK Singles (OCC)	33
US Hot R&B/Hip-Hop Songs (Billboard)	39
US Dance Club Songs (Billboard)	20
