= List of Island Records artists =

This is a list of artists that once recorded for Island Records or one of its associated labels.

== Current ==
=== A ===
- Adrian Eagle
- Alice Skye
- The Amazons
- Angèle
- Anitta
- Anna Graves
- Ariana Grande
- ArrDee
- Asha Banks

=== B ===
- Baby Queen
- Baker Boy
- Barkaa
- Belly
- Ben Howard
- Billy Porter
- Bon Jovi
- BoyWithUke
- Briggs
- Brittany Howard
- Broods
- Brooke McClymont & Adam Eckersley

=== C ===
- Cat & Calmell
- Catfish and the Bottlemen
- Chappell Roan
- Charlie Collins
- Charlieonnafriday
- Chelsea Cutler
- Chvrches
- Clare Bowditch
- Coi Leray
- Conan Gray

=== D ===
- Dean
- Dean Lewis
- Demi Lovato
- Dermot Kennedy
- Dora Jar
- Drake
- Dylan

=== E ===
- Em Beihold
- English Teacher

=== F ===
- The Feeling
- Flo

=== G ===
- Gigi Perez
- Gracie Abrams

=== H ===
- Hailee Steinfeld
- Hard Life
- Hilltop Hoods
- Hozier

=== I ===
- Isabella Manfredi

=== J ===
- James Hype
- Jamie Cullum
- Jarryd James
- Jazmin Bean
- Jeremy Zucker
- Jessie J
- Jessie Reyez
- Johnny Orlando
- JP Cooper

=== K ===
- Keo
- Keshi
- Kid Cudi
- The Killers
- Kim Petras
- Kobie Dee

=== L ===
- Lauren Spencer-Smith
- The Last Dinner Party
- The Lathums
- Ledbyher
- Lil Durk
- Lil Wayne
- Loreen

=== M ===
- Marcus Mumford
- Matt Corby
- The McClymonts
- Medium Build
- Meduza
- Metro Boomin
- M Huncho
- Mumford & Sons

=== N ===
- Navos
- New Hope Club
- Nia Archives
- Nick Jonas
- Nicki Minaj

=== O ===
- Oh Wonder
- Olivia Dean (US)
- OneRepublic

=== P ===
- Peach PRC
- Picard Brothers
- Post Malone

=== R ===
- Remi Wolf
- Robyn
- Running Touch

=== S ===
- Sabrina Carpenter
- Seth Sentry
- Shane Nicholson
- Shawn Mendes
- Sigrid
- Skip Marley
- SleazyWorld Go
- Sparks
- The Specials
- Spooky Tooth
- Sports Team
- Stephen Sanchez
- The Streets
- Stromae
- Swedish House Mafia

=== T ===
- Tame Impala
- The Two Lips

=== U ===
- U2

=== V ===
- Vera Blue

=== W ===
- The Wanted
- Wargasm
- The Weeknd
- WEISS
- Winterbourne

=== Y ===
- Yard Act
- Yorke
- Yung Gravy

== Former ==
=== 0–9 ===
- 49ers
- The 77s
- The 88
- 801

=== A ===
- Ai (Universal Sigma/Island)
- Aleka's Attic
- Alex Reece (Quango/Island)
- Alexei Sayle
- The Albion Country Band
- AlunaGeorge
- Alan Bown
- Amazing Blondel
- Amazulu (Mango/Island)
- Ambersunshower (Gee Street/Island)
- American Hi-Fi
- Amy Winehouse
- Andrew W.K.
- Andy Gibb
- Angélique Kidjo (Mango/Island)
- Annie
- Anthrax (Megaforce/Island)
- Apache Indian (Mango/Island)
- Arrow (Mango/Island)
- Art
- Art of Noise (ZTT/Island)
- Aswad
- Autopilot Off
- Avicii

=== B ===
- The B-52's (outside Americas/Australia)
- Bad Company (UK/Europe)
- Beenie Man (Island Jamaica)
- Bernard Szajner
- Bill Laswell (Axiom/Island)
- Bhundu Boys
- Black Uhuru
- Black Rebel Motorcycle Club
- Blancmange
- Blessing Annatoria (Island UK)
- Bob Dylan (Island UK)
- Bob Marley (Tuff Gong/Island)
- Bomb the Bass (Quango/Island)
- Boo-Yaa T.R.I.B.E. (4th & B'way/Island)
- Boukman Eksperyans (Mango/Island)
- Boy Kill Boy
- Blue in Heaven
- Brian Eno
- Bronco
- The Bronx
- Bryan Ferry (E.G./Island)
- Bryn Haworth
- Brutha
- Buckwheat Zydeco
- The Buggles
- Buju Banton (Loose Cannon/Island)
- Burning Flames
- Burning Spear
- Busted
- By All Means (4th & B'way/Island)

=== C ===
- Calvin Jeremy (Universal Music/Island Indo/Malay)
- Cat Stevens (outside North America)
- Caviar
- Chaba Fadela (Mango/Island)
- Chaka Demus & Pliers (Mango/Island)
- Charlélie Couture
- Charlie Peacock
- The Chieftains
- Christina Grimmie
- Cimorelli
- CKY
- Claire Hamill
- Claytown Troupe
- Clocks
- Clouds
- Clubland (Great Jones/Island)
- Cord
- The Cranberries

=== D ===
- Daddy-O
- Damone
- Daniel Bedingfield
- Darol Anger (Six Degrees/Island)
- Def Leppard (US/Canada/Argentina)
- Dennis Cowan
- Deus
- Die Trying
- Dillinger
- Dino (4th & B'way/Island)
- The Disposable Heroes of Hiphoprisy (4th & B'way/Island)
- The Distractions
- Dogs (band)
- Double Dee and Steinski (4th & B'way/Island)
- Doug E. Fresh (Gee Street Independent/Island)
- Dr. Strangely Strange
- Dhar Braxton (Sleeping Bag/Fourth and Broadway/Island)
- Dream Warriors (4th & B'way/Island)
- Drivin' N' Cryin'
- Driza Bone (4th & B'way/Island)
- Dru Hill

=== E ===
- Earl Brutus (Fruition/Island)
- Eddie and the Hot Rods
- Eek-A-Mouse (Peace Posse/Island)
- Electric Company (Supreme/Island)
- Electrovamp
- Elkie Brooks
- Elton John (Rocket/Island) (US)
- Emerson, Lake & Palmer (UK/Europe)
- Engine Alley
- Eric B. & Rakim (4th & B'way/Island)
- Etta James
- Melissa Etheridge
- Everlast
- Emotional Oranges

=== F ===
- Fairport Convention
- Fall Out Boy
- The Feeling
- Fefe Dobson
- Fightstar
- Dr. Fiorella Terenzi
- Florence and the Machine
- Fotheringay
- Frankie Goes to Hollywood (ZTT/Island)
- Frankmusik
- The Fratellis
- Free (outside US/Canada until 1972)
- Freestyle Fellowship (4th & B'way/Island)

=== G ===
- Gabriella Cilmi
- Galinha Pintadinha
- Gavin Christopher
- George Michael (Ægean/Island)
- Georgie Fame
- Grace Jones
- Gravediggaz (Gee Street/Island)
- Gregory Isaacs

=== H ===
- Hanson
- Harry Belafonte
- Hi Tension
- Hinda Hicks
- Hoobastank
- Howie B. (Island Independent)

=== I ===
- Iamnotshane
- If
- Iggy Azalea
- Illusuion
- Incredible String Band
- Injected
- Innerpartysystem
- Insane Clown Posse
- Isis (4th & B'way/Island)
- The Isley Brothers

=== J ===
- J. Holiday
- Jack & Jack
- Jackie Edwards
- Jade Warrior
- The Jags
- Janet Jackson
- Javine Hylton
- Jennifer Lopez
- Jess Roden
- Jessie Ware
- Jethro Tull (Chrysalis/Island)
- Jimmie's Chicken Shack (Rocket/Island)
- Jimmy Buffett (Margaritaville/Island)
- Jimmy Cliff
- John Cale
- John Martyn
- Jon McLaughlin
- Jim Capaldi
- Julian Cope
- Justin Bieber

=== K ===
- Keisha Buchanan
- Kerli
- Kevin Ayers
- Khaled (Mango/Island)
- Khalil
- Kid Creole & the Coconuts (Europe)
- Kim Fowley
- King Crimson (UK/Europe)
- King Sunny Adé (Mango/Island)
- Kruder & Dorfmeister (Quango/Island)
- KSI (Universal/Island)
- Kym Marsh

=== L ===
- Ladytron
- Leyla Blue
- LaTour (Smash/Island)
- Leatherwolf
- Lee "Scratch" Perry
- Letter Kills
- Linda Thompson
- Linton Kwesi Johnson
- Local H
- Low Art Thrill (Fruition/Island)
- Luciano (Island Jamaica)
- Lucy Walsh

=== M ===
- Macy Gray
- Madison Beer
- Marc Broussard
- Mariah Carey (MonarC/Island)
- M/A/R/R/S (4th & B'way/Island)
- Material (Axiom/Island)
- Malcolm McLaren
- Margareth Menezes (Mango/Island)
- Marianne Faithfull
- Max Romeo
- McFly
- Melissa Etheridge
- Mica Paris
- Michael Nesmith
- The Mighty Bop (Quango/Island)
- Mikaila
- Miles Jaye
- Mobb Deep (4th & B'way/Island)
- Mona Lisa
- Morrissey
- Morten Harket (We Love Music/Island)
- Mott the Hoople (except US/Canada)
- Mountain
- Murray Head
- Mutya Buena

=== N ===
- N-Dubz
- Natalie Imbruglia
- Nearly God (Durban Poison/Island Independent)
- New Kingdom (Gee Street/Island)
- Nick Drake
- Nico
- Nightcrawlers (Great Jones/Island)
- Nina Nesbitt
- Nine Black Alps
- Nine Inch Nails (Europe)
- Nirvana UK
- No Warning
- Noel (4th & B'way/Island)
- Nuance (4th & B'way/Island)

=== O ===
- The Orb

=== P ===
- Peshay (Island Blue)
- Pete Wingfield
- Peter Sarstedt
- Peter Skellern
- Phil Manzanera (E.G./Island)
- Phranc
- Pitchshifter
- PJ Harvey
- PlayRadioPlay!
- PM Dawn (Gee Street/Island)
- Positive K
- The Pogues
- Poppy
- Pound
- Praxis (Axiom/Island)
- Primer 55
- Propaganda
- Puressence
- Pulp

=== Q ===
- Queen (except US/Canada)
- Quicksand
- Quintessence

=== R ===
- Redd Kross
- Renaissance (except the US and Canada)
- Richard Thompson
- Ringo Starr
- Rival Schools
- Robert Owens (4th & B'way/Island)
- Robert Palmer
- Robbie Williams
- Rockers Hi-Fi (4th & Broadway)
- The Rocket Summer
- Roni Size (Talkin' Loud/Island)
- Ronnie Lane
- Ronny Jordan (4th & B'way/Island)
- Roxy Music (Europe)
- Rubyhorse
- Rusted Root
- Ryan Star
- Rynx

=== S ===
- Salif Keita (Mango/Island)
- Saliva
- Sandy Denny
- Seohyun (SM Entertainment/Universal/Island Malaysia)
- Shankar (Axiom/Island)
- Sheep on Drugs (Smash/Island)
- Shelby Lynne (Island Nashville)
- Simon Shaheen
- Sk8star
- The Slits
- Sly & Robbie
- Soraya
- Soup Dragons
- Spanner Banner (Island Jamaica)
- Speedy Keen
- Spencer Davis Group
- Spooky Tooth
- Spread Eagle
- Spring Heel Jack (Island Independent)
- Startled Insects
- Steel Pulse
- Stereo MCs (Gee Street/Island)
- Steve Harvey
- Steve Winwood
- Stevie Salas
- Sue Draheim
- Sugababes
- Sum 41 (outside Canada)
- Sutherland Brothers & Quiver

=== T ===
- Taio Cruz (Mercury/Island)
- Takota
- Terra Naomi
- Third World
- Thrice
- Thursday
- Tom Tom Club
- Tone Loc (Delicious Vinyl/Island)
- Tony D (4th & B'way/Island)
- Toots & the Maytals
- Tom Waits
- Tori Amos
- Tove Lo
- Traffic
- Talvin Singh
- Tricky
- Tripping Daisy
- Trouble Funk
- Twiztid
- Tyler James

=== U ===
- Ultravox
- Uman (Six Degrees/Island)
- Umar Bin Hassan (Axiom/Island)
- Utada

=== V ===
- V
- V V Brown
- Vain
- Vanessa Amorosi
- Vinegar Joe
- The V.I.P.'s

=== W ===
- Wallis Bird
- Wally Badarou
- War
- The Waterboys
- The Wedding Present
- White Noise
- Wild Tchoupitoulas (Mango/Island)
- Wiley
- Will Downing (4th & B'way/Island)
- William S. Burroughs (Island Red Label)
- Willie Nelson
- Wilton Place Street Band
- Wolfmother
- Wynder K. Frog

=== X ===
- X-Clan (4th & B'way/Island)

=== Y ===
- The Yeah You's
- Yello (Smash/Island)
- Young MC (Delicious Vinyl/Island)

=== Z ===
- Chaba Zahouania (Mango/Island)
