= Courtney Pine =

British jazz musician (born 1964)

Courtney Pine CBE
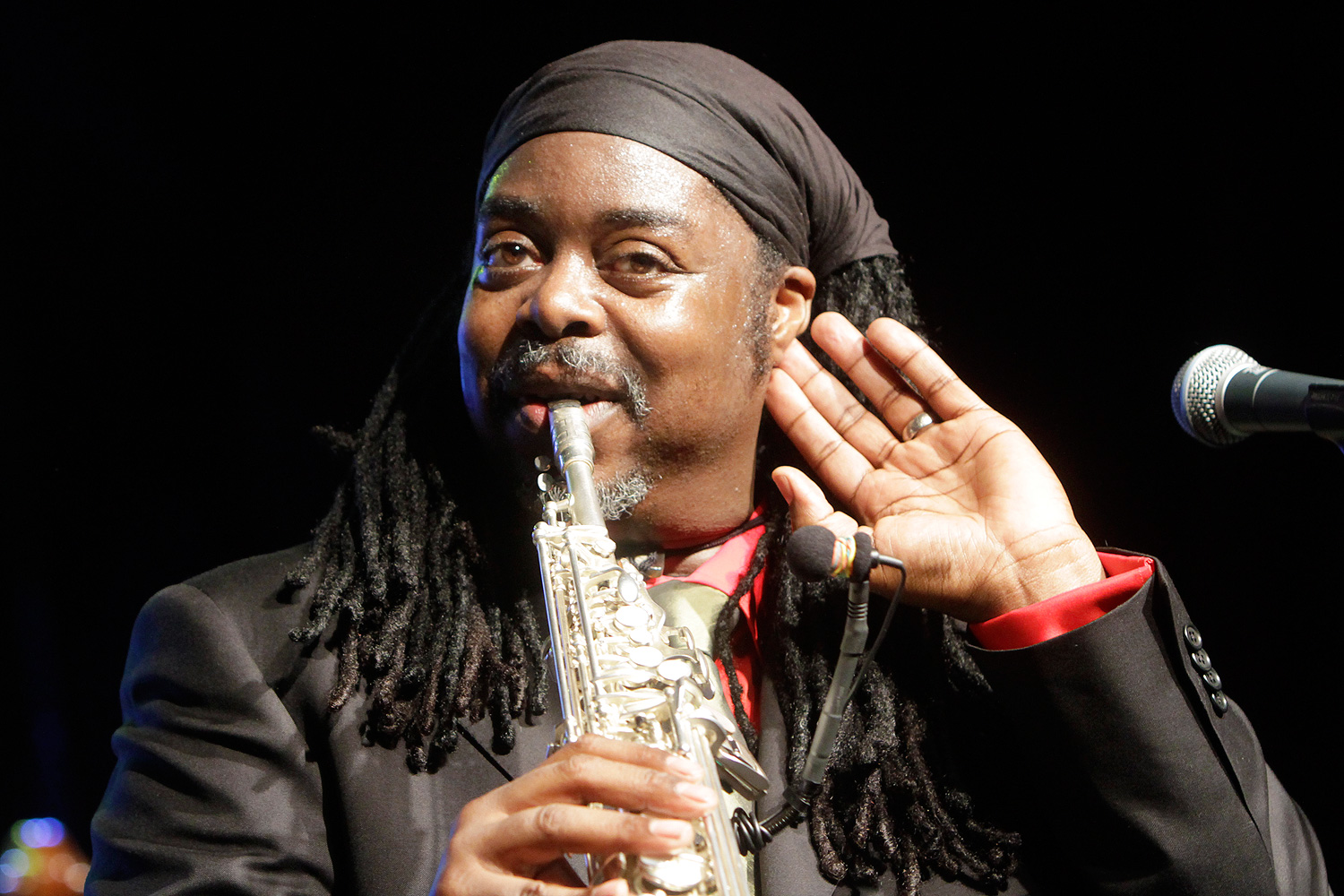
- Pine in 2010

Background information
- Born: 18 March 1964 (age 62)
- Origin: London, England
- Genres: Jazz
- Occupation: Musician
- Instruments: Saxophone; clarinet; bass clarinet; flute; electronic wind instrument (EWI); keyboards
- Years active: 1986–present

Courtney Pine, CBE (born 18 March 1964) is a British jazz musician, who was the principal founder of the black British band the Jazz Warriors in the 1980s. Although known primarily for his saxophone playing, Pine is a multi-instrumentalist, also playing the flute, clarinet, bass clarinet, and keyboards.

== Early life and education ==
Courtney Pine was born on 18 March 1964 in London. His parents were Jamaican immigrants, his father a carpenter and his mother a housing manager. As a child, Pine wanted to be an astronaut. Pine lived in the "Avenues" area of Kensal Green in north-west London, before moving to Wembley and attending Kingsbury High School, where he studied classical clarinet, teaching himself the saxophone from the age of 14.

== Career ==
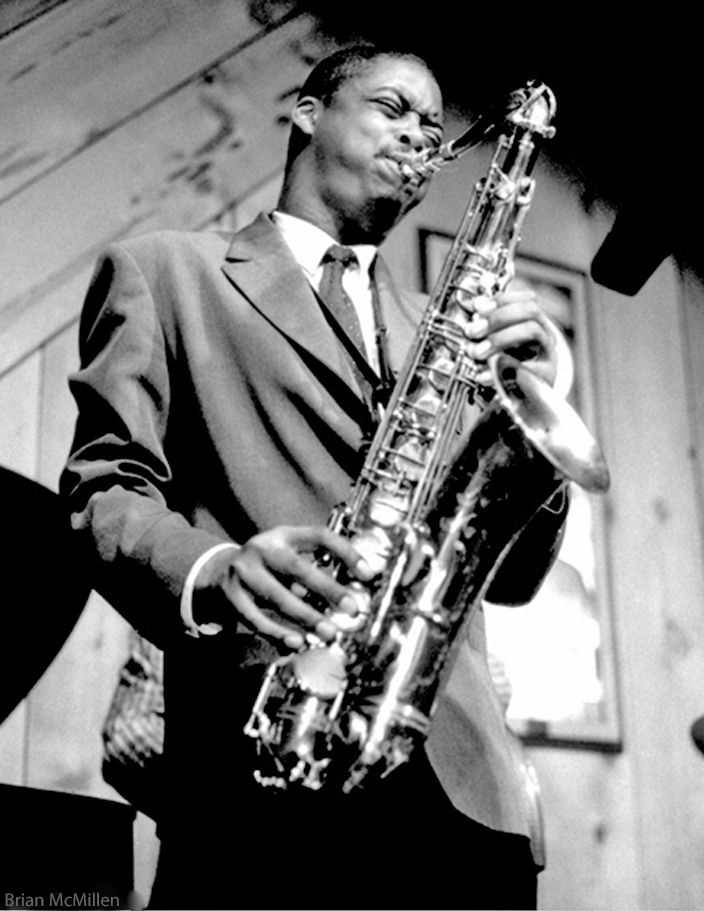
Courtney Pine at Bach Dancing & Dynamite Society, Half Moon Bay, California; November 20, 1988

Pine began his music career playing reggae, touring in 1981 with the duo Clint Eastwood & General Saint.

In 1986, his debut album, Journey to the Urge Within, entered the Top 40 of the UK Albums Chart. One of his early bands was the Grand Union Orchestra and he was featured on their 1986 album The Song of Many Tongues, composed by Tony Haynes.

Pine is the principal founder of the seminal black British big band the Jazz Warriors, which he established in 1985 through the community organisation The Abibi Jazz Arts (TAJA). The Jazz Warriors developed out of the Abibi All-Stars community band that did a series of performances at London's Royal Festival Hall foyer during the summer of the International Youth Year, 1985. The Jazz Warriors recorded two albums under Pine's leadership: Out of Many, One People, which was released on the Antilles division of the Island Records label in 1987, and Afropeans, which was released on Pine's own label, Destin-E Records, for their 20th anniversary in 2007. The Jazz Warriors Afropeans project was commissioned by the Arts Council of England to commemorate the bicentenary of the Abolition of the Slave Trade Act.

After losing his record contract in 1989, Pine appeared on stage with the Pet Shop Boys at Wembley Arena. He played saxophone on the closing portion of their single, "Nothing Has Been Proved".

In the early 2000s, his music integrated modern British music like drum and bass and UK garage with contemporary jazz styles. He had his own band and included many contemporary musicians in his performances. He presented Jazz Crusade on BBC Radio 2, the seventh series of which was broadcast during spring 2007.

Although known primarily for his saxophone playing, Pine is a multi-instrumentalist, also playing the flute, clarinet, bass clarinet, and keyboards. On his 2011 album, Europa, he plays almost exclusively bass clarinet.

Thirty years after Pine planted his idea to start the Jazz Warriors, in 2014 he put together the "Venus Warriors" all-female jazz band for a charity performance to raise awareness of the Mary Seacole Memorial Statue Appeal, which was established to erect a statue of the British-Jamaican Crimean War businesswoman and nurse outside of London's St Thomas' Hospital.

== Media appearances ==
21-year-old saxophonist Courtney Pine was filmed rehearsing with his band in 1985, and he also took time out to talk about his love of jazz and his work with the Community Music Workshop. Pine had recently done a gig at Ronnie Scott’s and hoped that more Black musicians would join the jazz scene. Clip from Ebony, originally broadcast on BBC Two, 13 December 1985.

In 1988, he appeared as himself in a jazz quartet in the Doctor Who serial Silver Nemesis.

Pine appeared in August 2008 as an advocate for Pierre Boulez on the BBC World News classical music programme Visionaries.

On Christmas Day 2018, Pine appeared on BBC Two's Merry Christmas Baby – with Gregory Porter & Friends.

== Recognition and honours ==
Pine was appointed Officer of the Order of the British Empire (OBE) in 2000, and Commander of the Order of the British Empire (CBE) in the 2009 New Year Honours for services to jazz music.

He was awarded an honorary doctorate from the University of Westminster on 6 December 2004. He was awarded an honorary doctorate from the University of Southampton on 15 July 2010.

== Personal life ==
Pine lives in London with his wife and their four children.

== Discography ==
=== Albums ===
As leader

- Journey to the Urge Within (1986) – UK No. 39
- Destiny's Song + The Image of Pursuance (1988) – UK No. 54
- The Vision's Tale (1989)
- Closer to Home (1990)
- Within The Realms of Our Dreams (1991)
- To the Eyes of Creation (1992)
- Modern Day Jazz Stories (1995)
- Underground (1997)
- Another Story (1998)
- Back in the Day (2000)
- Devotion (2003)
- Resistance (2005)
- Transition in Tradition: En Hommage a Sidney Bechet (2009)
- Courtney Pine Band Live (2010)
- Europa (2011)
- House of Legends (2012)
- Song (The Ballad Book) (2015)
- Black Notes from the Deep (2017)
- Spirituality (2022)
- Out of the Ghetto: A Modern-Day Jazz Story (2026)

As sideman

- Trevor Jones, Angel Heart (Soundtrack) (1987)
- Jazz Warriors, Out of Many, One People (1987)
- Mica Paris, So Good (1988)
- Harry Beckett, Les Jardins Du Casino (ITM, 1993)
- Jazz Warriors, Afropeans (2008)

=== Singles ===
- "Children of the Ghetto" (1986) – Courtney Pine, featuring the vocals of Susaye Greene
- "Like Dreamers Do" (1988) – UK No. 26 – Mica Paris, featuring Courtney Pine
- "I'm Still Waiting" (1990) – UK No. 66 – Courtney Pine, featuring Carroll Thompson
- "Get Busy" (1992) – produced by Gussie Clarke – 12" vinyl, CD single
- "Too Much To Lose" (1999) – Elkie Brooks, featuring Courtney Pine
- "Lady Day (& John Coltrane)" (2000) – Courtney Pine, featuring Lynden David Hall

=== EPs ===
- Traditions Beckoning (1988) – 10" limited edition

== See also ==
- Jazz Warriors
