= Contribution (album) =

Studio album by Mica Paris
- Released: 20 October 1990
- Recorded: 1989–1990
- Genre: R&B; freestyle; pop; adult contemporary
- Length: 50:40
- Label: Island
- Producer: Mica Paris; Camus Mare Celli; Andres Levin; Mantronik

Mica Paris chronology
So Good (1988)	Contribution (1990)	Whisper a Prayer (1993)

Singles from Contribution
- 1. "Contribution" Released: 1990; 2. "South of the River" Released: 1991; 3. "If I Love U 2 Nite" Released: 1991

Professional ratings
Review scores
Source	Rating
AllMusic	4/5 stars
Entertainment Weekly	C+
The Virgin Encyclopedia of R & B and Soul	2/5 stars

Contribution is the second studio album by British singer-songwriter Mica Paris, released on 20 October 1990 by 4th & B'way Records and Island Records. It includes three singles which reached the UK Singles Chart: "Contribution" (No. 33), "South of the River" (No. 50) and "If I Love U 2 Nite" (No. 43).

== Reception ==
Lynn Norment in EBONY described 'Paris' musical style is a combination of sultry soul and street-wise funk. Among her most enjoyable tunes are the title song, "Contribution", "South of the River," and "Truth and Honesty."

== Track listing ==
No.	Title	Writer(s)	Length
1.	"Contribution"	Andres Levin, Camus Mare Celli, Marga Roman, Michele Vice	3:59
2.	"South of the River"	Mick Leeson, Mica Paris, Peter Vale	5:10
3.	"If I Love U 2 Nite"	Prince	5:38
4.	"Just to Be With You"	Jon E.D., Kurtis Mantronik	4:06
5.	"Take Me Away"	Andres Levin, Camus Mare Celli	4:34
6.	"Truth And Honesty"	Mica Paris, Andres Levin, Camus Mare Celli	5:40
7.	"Deep Afrika (Interlude)"	Mica Paris	1:42
8.	"More Love"	Smokey Robinson	4:54
9.	"You Can Make a Wish"	Mick Leeson, Peter Vale	4:47
10.	"Just Make Me The One"	Andres Levin, Camus Mare Celli, Marga Roman	5:07
11.	"I Can't Stop Loving You"	Mick Leeson, Peter Vale	4:54
12.	"I've Been Watching You"	Mica Paris, Andres Levin, Camus Mare Celli	5:40
13.	"Who Can We Blame"	Andres Levin, Camus Mare Celli	5:46
14.	"One World (Outro)"	Andres Levin, Camus Mare Celli, Marga Roman, Michele Vice	1:21

== Personnel ==
- Mica Paris – vocals, backing vocals
- Camus Mare Celli – programming (1, 3, 5–14), arrangements (8)
- Andres Levin – programming (1, 3, 5–14), arrangements (8)
- Eric "CoDee" Cody – keyboards (1, 3, 5–14)
- K.C. Filson – keyboards (1, 3, 5–14)
- Garry Hughes – programming (1)
- Blacksmith – programming (2)
- Kurtis Mantronik – programming (4)
- Chris Parks – guitars (1, 3, 5–14)
- Paul Pesco – guitars (1, 3, 5–14)
- Nile Rodgers – guitars (1, 3, 5–14)
- Derek Johnson – guitars (2)
- Carl Carter – bass (1, 3, 5–14)
- Deon Estus – bass (1, 3, 5–14)
- Andy Hess – bass (1, 3, 5–14)
- Cyro Baptista – percussion (14)
- Marque Gilmore – percussion (14)
- Miguel Valdez – percussion (14)
- Harold Clemons – percussion (14)
- Lumaine Washington – percussion (14)
- The Delta Horns – brass (1, 3, 5–14):
  - Danny Wilensky – alto saxophone, tenor saxophone
  - Birch Johnson – trombone
  - Chris Botti – trumpet, flugelhorn
- Rakim – rap (1)
- Tracey Amos – backing vocals
- Michelle Cobbs – backing vocals
- Dennis Collins – backing vocals
- Craig Derry – backing vocals
- Will Downing – backing vocals
- Cindy Mizelle – backing vocals
- Marga Roman – backing vocals
- Fonzi Thornton – backing vocals
- Alisha Warren – backing vocals
- The Beat Inspector and Counsellor Ad-Bass – background voices (7)
- True Image – vocal group (8)

=== Production ===
- Mica Paris – co-producer
- Camus Mare Celli – producer (1–3, 5–14)
- Andres Levin – producer (1–3, 5–14)
- Dancin' Danny D – additional production (1)
- Blacksmith – additional production (2), remixing (2)
- Mantronik – producer (4), remixing (4)
- George Karras – recording, mixing (3, 5, 8, 10, 11, 13, 14)
- Garry Hughes – additional overdubs (1)
- Phil Bodger – mixing (1)
- Adam Fuest – remix engineer (2)
- Boyowa "Yoyo" Olugbo – remix engineer (2)
- Dave Feliciano – recording engineer (4), mix engineer (4)
- Andy Heermans – mix engineer (4)
- Acar Key – mixing (9, 12)
- Dick Meaney – assistant engineer (2)
- Michael Nash Associates – design
- Michel Comte – photography
- Bruce Garfield – artist management

== Charts ==
Chart performance for Contribution
Chart (1990)	Peak position
Australian Albums (ARIA)	234
UK Albums Chart	26
US Top R&B/Hip-Hop Albums	58

== Certifications ==
Region	Certification	Certified units/sales
United Kingdom (BPI)	Silver	60,000^{^}
^{^} Shipments figures based on certification alone.
