= Winterbourne (group) =

Australian-British musical duo

- Origin: Central Coast, New South Wales, Australia
- Genre: Indie rock
- Years active: 2011–present
- Labels: Island; Universal
- Members: Jordan Brady; James Draper
- Past members: Joshua Rea

Winterbourne are an Australian indie rock duo from the Central Coast, which formed in 2011 by Jordan Brady and James Draper. They have released two studio albums, Echo of Youth (2019) and Act of Disappearing (2023). Echo of Youth reached No. 24 on the ARIA Albums Chart. Their second extended play, Pendulum (2016), had peaked at No. 23 on the same chart.

== History ==
=== 2011–2017: From formation to Pendulum ===
Winterbourne were formed on the Central Coast, New South Wales as an indie rock duo by Jordan Brady and James Draper with both on guitar and vocals. They started by busking along Australia's east coast from Brisbane to Melbourne. The duo released their five-track debut extended play, All but the Sun, in May 2014 via Island Records Australia/Universal Music Australia. It reached the ARIA Albums Chart at number 100 in April 2015, following a national tour. On 27 May 2016 they released their six-track second EP, Pendulum, which peaked at number 23. The duo provided a track-by-track description of the EP for Tone Deaf magazine's staff writer in June. They toured Australia from June to July 2016. Pilerats' reviewer described their "psych-rock to soft acoustic guitars and harmonic undertones, it's abundantly clear that [the EP] was melded by a plethora of artists and sounds."

During 2017 they were joined by Joshua Rea on cello and piano; the trio performed in Adelaide in July in support of visiting English singer-songwriter Lewis Watson. Michaela McGrath of This Is Radelaide found the trio "shone through with their infectious personalities, quick wit and incredible tunes."

=== 2018–2019: Echo of Youth ===
In September 2018 Winterbourne, as a duo of Brady and Draper, issued "Better" as the lead single from their debut album, Echo of Youth, which was released in August 2019. For the album they worked with Andy Mak (Andrew Macken) as producer, Jackson Barclay as audio engineer and multi-instrumentalist Thom Mak (Thomas Macken) as studio musician recording at La Cueva, Byron Bay and at The Grove. The album's second single, "Take the Golden", was issued in January, which was co-written by Brady, Draper, A Mak and German musician Tobias Kuhn. The track was inspired by a visit to Dunkirk. They undertook another headlining national tour in April. Echo of Youth peaked at number 24. Alasdair Belling of The Music felt the group were "still pushing the boundaries sonically", however "[it] doesn't pack the same punch or excitement of earlier efforts... [and] for the better part, feels over-thought and over-produced."

=== 2020–present: Act of Disappearing ===
An acoustic version of Echo of Youth (April 2020) was followed by a live album A Brand New November (2021). Also in 2021 they launched a movie, Revolutionary, Film, which "grappled questions of ambition, nostalgia, reflection and of course, revolution." It was directed, edited, written and produced by the Winterbourne members. In September 2022 "Long Distance Runner" was issued as the lead single from their second studio album Act of Disappearing (November 2023). The album was co-produced by the duo and Barclay over a three-year span. Al Newstead of Double J felt, "[they] know their way around a chorus and pull from a tried-and-true bag of tricks to get to and from each of them: minor to major key changes, soaring vocal harmonies, hooky melodies"

== Members ==
- Jordan Brady – acoustic guitar, vocals
- James Draper – acoustic guitar, vocals
- Joshua Rea – cello, piano (fl. 2017)

== Discography ==
=== Studio albums ===
Title	Details	Peak chart positions
Title	Details	AUS
Echo of Youth	23 August 2019; Label: Island/Universal (6775318, 7753186, 7753285); Formats: CD, download, LP, streaming	24
Act of Disappearing	17 November 2023; Label: Island Records Australia	

=== Extended plays ===
Title	Details	Peak chart positions
Title	Details	AUS
All But the Sun	Released: 16 May 2014; Label: Island/Universal (3778392); Format: CD, download, vinyl	100
Pendulum	Released: 27 May 2017; Label: Island/Universal (4786559); Format: CD, download, LP, streaming	23

=== Singles ===
Title	Year	Album
"Cold"	2014	All But the Sun
"Steady My Bones"	2015	All But the Sun
"To Get to Know You"	2015	Pendulum
"Shape"	2015	Pendulum
"Better"	2018	Echo of Youth
"Take the Golden"	2019	Echo of Youth
"Long Distance Runner"	2022	Act of Disappearing
"Forevermore"	2022	Act of Disappearing
"Velvet, Honey & Wine"	2023	Act of Disappearing
