= My One Temptation =

1988 single by Mica Paris

Single by Mica Paris

from the album So Good
- Released: 1988
- Genre: R&B, soul
- Length: 4:38
- Label: 4th & Broadway / Island Records
- Songwriters: Mick Leeson, Miles Waters, Peter Vale

Mica Paris singles chronology
"My One Temptation" (1988)	"Like Dreamers Do" (1988)

Music video
- "My One Temptation" on YouTube

"My One Temptation" is the debut single by British singer Mica Paris, released as the first single from her debut album, So Good (1988). The song was released by 4th & Broadway and Island Records in 1988 and became Mica Paris' biggest hit, reaching the top ten of the UK Singles Chart and US Adult Contemporary chart. It was also a top twenty hit on the US R&B singles and Irish singles charts.

== Critical reception ==
The song has been described as "haunting" by critics. Kris Kirk from Melody Maker wrote, "Ex-Spirit of Watts vocalist Mica drops the hot gospel and goes supercool secular with a jazzy, dreamy swayer of a dance track that's certain to be a summer hit, despite the fact I nearly dropped off."

== Music Videos ==
Three music videos were made for the single. One was broadcast in the UK where Mica is in a luxurious dimly lit room daydreaming about her lover shown on a screen of changing pictures as a man outside plays on his flugel horn during the song. Another video was filmed in for the US in California where Mica with several clips from her previous video "Breathe Life into Me" and Mica wearing several casual outfits as well as appearing on beach rocks as depicted from her US album art cover to her debut album. A third music video was also filmed for the US where Mica performs with her band.

== Charts ==
Chart (1988–1989)	Peak position
Australia (Australian Music Report)	100
Belgium (Ultratop 50 Wallonia)	27
Canada Adult Contemporary (RPM)	7
Ireland (IRMA)	15
Italy Airplay (Music & Media)	11
Luxembourg (Radio Luxembourg)	5
Netherlands (Dutch Top 40)	22
Netherlands (Single Top 100)	39
New Zealand (Recorded Music NZ)	37
UK Singles (Official Charts)	7
US Billboard Hot 100	97
US Hot R&B/Hip-Hop Songs (Billboard)	15
US Adult Contemporary (Billboard)	8
US Dance Club Songs (Billboard)	36
West Germany (GfK)	30

== See also ==
- List of UK top 10 singles in 1988
