= So Good (Mica Paris album) =

1988 studio album by Mica Paris

Studio album by Mica Paris
- Released: 1 August 1988
- Recorded: 1987–88
- Studio: The Manor Studio (Oxford, UK); The Fallout Shelter and Maison Rouge (London, UK)
- Genre: R&B; soul
- Length: 41:38
- Label: 4th & B'way; Island
- Producer: L'Equipe; Will Downing

Mica Paris chronology
So Good (1988)	Contribution (1990)

Singles from So Good
- 1. "My One Temptation" Released: 1988; 2. "Like Dreamers Do" Released: 1988; 3. "Breathe Life into Me" Released: 1988; 4. "Where Is the Love" Released: 1988

So Good is the debut album by British recording artist Mica Paris. It was released on 1 August 1988 by 4th & B'way Records.

The album was a commercial success, peaking at number six on the UK Albums Chart and also appearing stateside on the Billboard 200 and Top R&B/Hip-Hop Albums charts. So Good was certified platinum by the British Phonographic Industry (BPI), denoting shipments of more than 300,000 copies in the UK.

Four singles were released from the album, all of which reached the top-30 of the UK Singles Chart. "My One Temptation" was chosen as the album's lead single, becoming a top-ten hit in the UK and also peaking within the top-20 of the Irish Singles and US Hot R&B/Hip-Hop Songs charts. It was her first and remains her only entry on the US Billboard Hot 100. The album's fourth and final single is a cover of the Roberta Flack and Donny Hathaway single "Where Is the Love" and features American singer-songwriter Will Downing.

== Background ==
Mica Paris began singing in community churches, aged seven, and joined a young gospel group, The Spirit of Watts, at 12. The Spirit of Watts featured on the Word Records Buzz On The Streets (1985) album and the Ears and Eyes Gospel Joy - A Live Celebration (1986) album. Aged 13, Paris sought session work, inspired by her father, a jazz trumpeter and flautist, as well as older friends and sister Alysha Warren (who also achieved success as a solo artist). She told Ebony, "I pretended to be older because I was tall for my age (5' 10") and I got my first session that way." Paris was also a backing singer for Hollywood Beyond, recording on their debut album If (1985), before signing her first record deal with jazz label 4th & Broadway (an Island Records subsidiary), while still a teenager.

Paris told Ebony that "you do have to be a tough girl to succeed in the music industry [...] but you don't have to be obnoxious and conceited. I can't walk the streets in London; everyone knows who Mica Paris is, but I've never let it get to me because I just don't believe in it [...] I think that's what keeps you above all the bad things that go into [the business] — when you maintain the way you are."

== Recording ==
Describing Paris as "the greatest of British gospel/soul singers", studio engineer Richard Digby Smith recounted:

"Mica was unsigned at the time but it was apparent very early on that this incredibly talented young lady was going places. Her temperament suggested a reluctance at times to perform in the studio and she certainly tested the patience of her manager, Viv Broughton as well as mine and Nicky's. 'Don't feel like singing today' was her usual lament. 'Time is money, Mica,' was always Viv's response, 'so you've got no choice. Now do us all a favour and get a vocal on this track'. It was all a bit of a teasing game, good natured and at times quite hilarious. Mica would sulk into the studio, pick up the headphones, stand at the microphone and completely blow us all away with her powerfully passionate singing. Perfect intonation, the clearst of enunciation and so much soul. The tracks we recorded at Flame contributed to Mica's first album deal, So Good."

In Ebony, Paris expressed: "I gave it all I had when I worked on it." Ebony explained that, Paris expressed to label executives her desire "to make music that would cross over to the Black and White publics and still maintain the soul. And they told her politely that they didn't know how she was going to do that. She did it by carefully selecting her songs. She said, 'I refuse to sing songs that don't make sense to me — about Mercedes, or materialistic crap.'" Ebony wrote that the songs "blend pop and soul sounds"; "My One Temptation" being "upbeat and playful", while "Where is the Love" and the title track "So Good" "offer a bit more rhythm and blues".

Lead single, "My One Temptation", was written by British-born songwriters Mick Leeson and Peter Vale, who were both former school teachers who began writing in the early 1980s. They also wrote hits for Sheena Easton ("One Man Woman"), Alvin Stardust ("So Near to Christmas") and Haywoode ("Roses").

== Reception ==
=== Critical response ===
Professional ratings
Review scores
Source	Rating
AllMusic	2.5/5 stars
The Rolling Stone Album Guide	2/5 stars
Stereo Review	satisfactory
The Virgin Encyclopedia of R & B and Soul	3/5 stars

So Good achieved generally positive reviews from critics. In a retrospective review, AllMusic editor, Alex Henderson praised Paris's "fine range", describing her as an "earthy singer" and compared her to American singer Natalie Cole. Furthermore, he wrote that Paris "is among the many noteworthy talents to come out of Britain's healthy R&B scene of the 1980s and '90s". Henderson listed "the haunting 'My One Temptation', the jazz-influenced 'Sway (Dance the Blues Away)' and the sizzling 'Nothing Hits Your Heart like Soul Music'" as the album's "more noteworthy cuts" but commented that "'Where Is the Love'... makes it crystal clear that she's quite capable of depth" and "does the most to test what Paris is truly made of".

=== Commercial reception ===
So Good debuted and peaked at number six on the UK Albums Chart, dropping to number 10 in its second week on the chart and falling out of the top 10 the following week to number 19. Though So Good dropped out of the top forty in its sixth week to number forty-four it re-entered at number 40 the following week, holding the position for two weeks. The album dropped out of and re-entered the top-forty a total of four times before accumulating a total of thirty-two weeks on the chart. So Good was certified silver on 19 August 1988, gold on 8 September 1988 and platinum on 14 February 1989 by the British Phonographic Industry (BPI).

In the US, So Good peaked at number 86 on the Billboard 200, accumulating a total of 23 weeks on the chart but found greater success on the Top R&B/Hip-Hop Albums chart, peaking at 29 and accumulating a total of twenty-four weeks on the chart.

== Singles ==
"My One Temptation" was the first single released from the album and is Paris's biggest hit to date. It peaked at number 15 in Ireland and number seven in the UK, where it accumulated a total of 13 weeks on the singles chart. In the US, the song was also a top-10 hit on the Billboard component Adult Contemporary chart peaking at number seven. Furthermore, it peaked at number 15 and number 36 on the Hot R&B/Hip-Hop Songs and Hot Dance Club Songs charts respectively and remains Paris's only entry on the US Billboard Hot 100 where it reached number 97.

Her second and third singles, "Like Dreamers Do", featuring jazz musician Courtney Pine, and "Breathe Life Into Me", both peaked within the top 30 of the UK Singles Chart, while the latter also reached the top 30 of the US R&B/Hip-Hop Songs chart (then titled "Hot Black Singles").

Her fourth and final single, "Where Is the Love", is a cover of the 1972 Grammy Award-winning Roberta Flack and Donny Hathaway single written by Ralph MacDonald and William Salter. It became the album's second top-20 hit in the UK and Paris's second and last appearance on the Irish Singles Chart, where it peaked at number 21.

In the US, "Don't Give Me Up" was released, reaching number 87 on the US R&B/Hip-Hop Songs chart in the week of 9 December 1989.

== Track listing ==
All tracks composed by Mick Leeson and Peter Vale; except where indicated.

1. "Like Dreamers Do" (Miles Waters, Peter Vale, Sue Shifrin) (featuring Courtney Pine) - 4:22
2. "My One Temptation" (Mick Leeson, Miles Waters, Peter Vale) - 4:34
3. "Nothing Hits Your Heart Like Soul Music" - 4:25
4. "Sway (Dance The Blues Away)" - 4:51
5. "Don't Give Me Up" (Mica Paris, Paul Powell) - 3:39
6. "Breathe Life Into Me" - 4:58
7. "I'd Hate To Love You" - 4:48
8. "Great Impersonation" - 3:42
9. "Where Is the Love" (featuring Will Downing)^ - 3:28
10. "So Good" (Miles Waters, Peter Vale, Sue Shifrin) - 4:52

^Some releases feature the song "Words Into Action" (4:47) in place of "Where Is the Love".

== Personnel ==
- Mica Paris – lead vocals, backing vocals
- L'Equipe (Peter Vale and Miles Waters) – keyboards, Hammond organ, programming, guitars, bass, drums, percussion, backing vocals
- Pete Wingfield – keyboards
- Milton McDonald – guitars
- Paul Powell – bass, programming
- Steve Ferrera – drums, percussion, programming
- Orphy Robinson – vibraphone
- Courtney Pine – soprano saxophone, tenor saxophone, sax solo (1)
- Kevin Robinson – flugelhorn
- Paul Johnson – backing vocals, lead vocals on "Words Into Action"
- Roger Christian – vocals (3)
- Will Downing – vocals (5, 9)
- The Wallen Sisters – spoken intro (7)

The Parisienne Choir

- Janice Hoyte, Katie Kissoon, Neil Lockwood, Candy McKenzie, Danny Ricketts and Paula Wallen

=== Production ===
- L'Equipe – producers (1–8, 10), mixing (1–8, 10)
- Will Downing – producer ("Words Into Action" and "Where Is the Love")
- Chris Burkett – engineer
- Raine Shine – engineer
- Lee Hamblin – mix engineer
- Michael J. Ade – assistant engineer
- Ed Buller – assistant engineer
- Ingmar Kiang – assistant engineer
- J.B. "Jaybee" Lierre – assistant engineer
- Hugo Nicolson – assistant engineer
- Nick Varack – assistant engineer
- Michael Nash Associates – design
- Robert Freeman – photography

== Charts ==
Chart (1988)	Peak position
Australian Albums (ARIA)	127
Dutch Albums (Album Top 100)	91
New Zealand Albums (RMNZ)	38
UK Albums (OCC)	6
US Billboard 200	86
US Top R&B/Hip-Hop Albums (Billboard)	29

== Certifications ==
Region	Certification	Certified units/sales
United Kingdom (BPI)	Platinum	300,000^{^}
^{^} Shipments figures based on certification alone.
