= Mica Paris =

English singer, presenter and actress (born 1969)

Mica Paris MBE
- Born: Michelle Antoinette Wallen; 27 April 1969 (age 57); Islington, London, England
- Years active: 1985–present
- Television: EastEnders
- Children: 2
- Relatives: Chris Eubank (cousin)
- Musical career
- Genres: Soul; gospel; R&B; jazz
- Occupations: Singer; presenter; actress
- Labels: Island; Chrysalis; Warner
- Website: www.micaparis.com

Michelle Antoinette Wallen MBE (born 27 April 1969), known professionally as Mica Paris (/ˈmiːʃə/ MEE-shə), is a British singer, presenter, and actress. Her debut album, So Good, was released in 1988, spawning the singles "My One Temptation" and "Where Is the Love". She has since gone on to release seven further albums: Contribution (1990), Whisper a Prayer (1993), Black Angel (1998), If You Could Love Me (2005), Soul Classics (2005), Born Again (2009), and Gospel (2020). In 2020, Paris played Ellie Nixon on the BBC soap opera EastEnders.

== Music ==
Paris grew up singing in her grandparents' church, and by her mid-teens was making regular appearances with the Spirit of Watts gospel choir (with whom she featured on the 1985 EP Gospel Joy). At the age of 17, she became a backing vocalist with the UK band Hollywood Beyond. Paris appeared on their album If (1985). In 1988, she released her debut and platinum-selling album So Good with 4th & Broadway when she was 19 years old. "My One Temptation" was the lead single. This led to a collaboration with American soul singer Will Downing on a cover version of a classic "Where Is the Love", made famous by Donny Hathaway and Roberta Flack in the early 1970s.

The follow-up album, Contribution, was released in 1990. This extended Paris' soul and gospel influences to bring in hip-hop and house music and featured the track "If I Love U 2 Nite", written by Prince and recorded at his Paisley Park studios. With Omar Lye-Fook, a classically trained musician, Paris recorded "I Should've Known Better" in 1990. It was issued on the B-side to "South of the River". Paris also recorded with Anita Baker, Bonnie Raitt and Natalie Cole on the album Nelson Mandela: An International Tribute for a Free South Africa (1990), and provided the title track to Isaac Julien's Young Soul Rebels movie soundtrack the following year. She worked with the saxophonist Courtney Pine ("Redemption Song" – 1992), the Stereo MCs ("Don't Let Up" – 1992) and Bobby Womack ("I Wish I'd Never Met You" – 1991).

Her third album was Whisper a Prayer (1993), which included the singles "I Never Felt Like This Before" and "I Wanna Hold On To You", as well as "You Put a Move on My Heart" which was later recorded by Tamia in 1995 on Quincy Jones's Q's Jook Joint album. This followed by more collaboration work on album tracks with Guru on his Jazzmatazz II ("Looking Through Darkness" in 1995), Mark Morrison ("Tears For You" – 1996) and Maxwell ("Mantra" – 1996). Paris released the album Black Angel on Chrysalis in 1998. It contained a cover version of U2's "One", and a duet with James Ingram. Black Angel produced two more Top 20 singles in "Stay" and 'Carefree". More collaborations followed with Omar ("Confection" – 1994), Max Beesley ("High Vibes" – 1994), Dubversive ("Police & Thieves" – 1998), the Mobo All Stars compilation album in 1998, Mister Exe ("One Million Smiles" – 1998), Prince ("Just My Imagination" – 2000) and Boy George ("I Could Be Someone" – 2000). A collaboration with David Gilmour and Jools Holland on Screamin' Jay Hawkins' track "I Put a Spell on You" followed in 2001. The trio had regrouped on occasions to perform the hit.

Two years later, Paris lent her voice to Walt Disney Pictures (Touchstone Pictures) soundtrack for High Heels and Low Lifes, which was later included in the Primal Screen soundtrack compilation album (2001). In 2003, Paris released the Moby sampling "Heart" with Seraphim Suite. Paris also joined Omar onstage for his gig at The Shepherds Bush Empire. She also contributed to the track "I Don't Understand" on Milk & Sugar album. 2004 saw Paris feature as a guest on The New Inspirational Choir's album Inspirations along with Keisha White and Jocelyn Brown. In 2005, Paris released the album If You Could Love Me (Wounded Bird Records), featuring backing from the Brecker Brothers on the title track, with executive producer Andreas Neumann and producer Bernard Grobman. Also in 2005, she released the album Soul Classics, with executive producers Rick Blaskey and Andreas Neumann. Paris collaborated with Lemar on the track "Can't You See" on his album The Truth About Love in 2006, and in February 2008, she released the duet "Secret Lovers" with Alexander O'Neal. This was followed by a residency at the Indigo 02.

In June 2009, she released her sixth studio album, Born Again. She embarked on a nationwide tour, which included dates at the Jazz Cafe in February 2009 to showcase the material. The album was produced by Brian Rawling. James Morrison wrote Paris' first single, "Baby Come Back Now". Paris released the second single from Born Again on 17 August 2009. The track, "The Hardest Thing", was remixed by Stonebridge, Almighty and 2Darc. Paris performed at various venues prior to the release from the album in March 2010 of the title track "Born Again".

On 4 June 2022, Paris performed "Climb Ev'ry Mountain" with Nicola Roberts and Ruby Turner at the Platinum Party at the Palace concert to celebrate the Platinum Jubilee of Queen Elizabeth II.

== Other ventures ==
=== Television and radio ===
In 2002, Paris hosted a programme on BBC Radio 2, titled Soul Solutions and narrated several music documentaries for the station. She also presented the 2002 Channel 4 television documentary The Gospel of Gospel which revealed the influence of the black American church tradition on pop music. Produced and directed by David Upshal, it featured contributions from Ray Charles, Isaac Hayes, B. B. King, Al Green, Chaka Khan, Alexander O'Neal, Edwin Hawkins, The Blind Boys of Alabama and Mary Mary. Furthermore, she broadcast a two-part show, Purple Reign: The Prince Story, on BBC Radio 2 which covered the entirety of the American artist's controversial career and featured interviews with George Clinton, Chaka Khan and Jimmy Jam. She was also a narrator on an award-winning documentary featuring Diana Ross focusing on her European and international success rather than her megastar status in the states.

In 2005, she appeared on week three of the ITV reality series Hit Me, Baby, One More Time, which was won by Carol Decker. The same year she made an appearance in, and was the winner of, week one in the second series of Come Dine with Me. From 2007, she was a co-host for two seasons of the popular consumer style programme What Not to Wear for BBC Television. Other television presenting has followed with Paris being an expert judge on Gok Wan's Miss Naked Beauty for Channel 4 and ITV's CelebAir.

In 2007, she played the part of Amelia Walker, a fictitious American jazz singer, in At Bertram's Hotel, an episode of the ITV series Marple. During the drama the character gives a concert at the Royal Albert Hall, and also sings with Louis Armstrong's band rehearsing in the hotel dining room whilst both were guests at the hotel. On 8 July 2008, Paris, her mother, father and sister appeared as The Paris Brigade on series 4 episode 9 of Gordon Ramsay's The F Word, as part of the celebrity brigades series. Paris has continued to appear on a variety of television programmes—from Channel 5's news talk show The Wright Stuff, ITV1's all-female panel talk show Loose Women, The Michael Ball Show and BBC One's Strictly Come Dancing.

During 2013, Paris became a regular guest on the ITV show This Morning. In February 2017, she stood in for Craig Charles on his Saturday night House Party, 10 pm to midnight, on BBC Radio 2 for two weeks. She later stood in for Trevor Nelson on his Saturday night Rhythm Nation, 8 pm to 10 pm, at the same station, in April 2017. In October 2017, she performed a medley of 1980s classics on BBC1's Children in Need Rocks the 80s. In 2020, Paris was cast in the BBC soap opera EastEnders as Ellie Nixon. On 27 December 2020, she was on Songs of Praise. On 14 December 2023, Paris was featured on BBC Radio 4's Woman's Hour promoting her new album and Sky Arts show, A Gospel Christmas, with her supporting singers. The programme was broadcast on 23 December 2023. In 2026, Paris appeared as a contestant on the seventh series of The Masked Singer as "Toastie". She reached the final and finished in third place.

=== Theatre ===
In 1993, Paris starred in two West End shows: Mama I Want to Sing and Sweet Lorraine. In October 2004, Paris took part in the UK tour of the stage play The Vagina Monologues. In the summer of 2015, Paris took part in the UK tour of the musical Love Me Tender. In 2019, Paris starred in a production of Fame.

=== Book ===
While presenting What Not To Wear, Paris encountered many women whose stories touched her. She began to examine her own life and choices, and was compelled to tell her story in a bid to inspire confidence and self-esteem to those women and others. Her book Beautiful Within: Finding Happiness and Confidence in Your Own Skin was published by Simon & Schuster UK; ISBN 1-84737-085-3. The paperback was released in August 2008.

== Charity work ==
Paris has designed a pillow-case for ByteNight a charity event organised to raise funds for the NCH and youth homelessness. Mica is the patron for the Space For Music project, the project to renovate Band on the Wall a venue owned and operated by registered charity Inner City Music Ltd. She is also an Ambassador for The Amy Winehouse Foundation and has sung at many special fundraising occasions for the charity including their 2012 Ball. She is also currently supporting the "No Means No" anti-rape and gender equality campaign set up by the largest free local newspaper for English expats in Spain, EuroWeekly News.

== Accolades ==
In 2003, Paris was presented with the Gold Badge Award by the Ivors Academy for her special contribution to the British entertainment industry. In 2004 she was in the Top 10 list of the 100 Great Black Britons, which was compiled to celebrate the achievements and contributions made by the British Black community over the centuries.

Paris was appointed Member of the Order of the British Empire (MBE) in the 2020 Birthday Honours for services to music, entertainment and charity.

== Personal life ==
Paris was born in Islington in North London, but moved to Brockley, South London, when she was nine. She has discussed being teased as a child for having the name "Michelle" due to the popularity of Susan Tully’s portrayal of Michelle Fowler in EastEnders, causing her to adopt the nickname, and later professional name, "Mica".

Paris has two daughters, Monet (b. 1991, with her Irish former husband) and Russia-Mae (b. June 2006, from her previous relationship with German film director Andreas Neumann). Paris is a close friend of American singer Chaka Khan. The two first met while both performing at the Royal Albert Hall, and Khan is godmother to Paris' elder daughter.

Paris' sister, Paula Wallen, was also a pop music singer, and she is the cousin of boxer Chris Eubank. Paris has been an ambassador of the Metropolitan Police's Operation Trident since 2001, when her brother was shot dead while at work.

== Discography ==
- So Good (1988)
- Contribution (1990)
- Whisper a Prayer (1993)
- Black Angel (1998)
- If You Could Love Me (2005)
- Soul Classics (2005)
- Born Again (2009)
- Gospel (2020)

== See also ==
- List of black Britons
- List of performers on Top of the Pops
- List of former Island Records artists
- List of stage names
