= 4th & B'way Records =

- Parent company: Universal Music Group
- Founded: 1984 (original); 2013 (relaunch)
- Founder: Chris Blackwell
- Defunct: 1998 (original)
- Status: Active
- Distributors: Island Records (US); Def Jam Recordings; EMI Records (UK)
- Genre: Dance, hip hop
- Country of origin: United States
- Location: New York City; Santa Monica, California

4th & B'way Records (pronounced /fɔːrθ ænd ˈbrɔːdweɪ/ and spelled out completely as Fourth and Broadway Records in the UK) is a US-based subsidiary of Island Records that specialised in street-oriented music such as hip hop. Established in 1984, it was the flagship label of the Island Trading Company, the independent-distribution parent company of Island's other record labels that operated in the US. However, 4th & B'way was not distributed through major-label channels—the flagship Island label was distributed by Atlantic Records at that time—until the label and distribution company were acquired by PolyGram Records in 1989, when Island Trading became a unit of PolyGram Group Distribution and was renamed Independent Label Sales (ILS). It was also one of several US-based Island labels that were named after nearby New York City streets when Island's US headquarters were located at 14 East 4th Street in Manhattan, the same building that held the legendary East Village branch of Tower Records, and also nearby at 400 Lafayette Street. When Island moved its headquarters to the Worldwide Plaza Building at 825 8th Avenue in 1995, where PolyGram's US headquarters were also located, the empty 4th Street offices became the headquarters of V2 Records.

In the UK, Fourth and Broadway was established in 1992, and it had a roster different from its American version, although it did release titles from its American cousin and vice versa. 4th & B'way was shut down in 1998, shortly after Chris Blackwell left Island Records, and before the merger of the PolyGram and MCA label families that became Universal Music Group. 4th & B'way's remaining hip hop artists would be transferred to Def Jam Recordings.

"Pump Up the Volume" by MARRS was distributed by 4th & B'way in the US. Other notable artists included Eric B and Rakim, Noel, and Dino.

On April 12, 2013, The Island Def Jam Music Group reactivated the label as a dance-oriented imprint with Cazzette as its first artist on the reactivated imprint, and has also signed Route 94, Kiesza, and Loote.

On November 17, 2020, Island Records relaunched the label again, naming LaTrice Burnette as the president of 4th and Broadway. Burnette will also continue her role as executive vice president of Island. After being previously distributed by Island and strategically aligned with Republic Records in 2020, it was announced February 2022, 4th and B'way switched distribution to former sister label Def Jam Recordings.

== See also ==
- Category:4th & B'way Records albums
- List of Island Records artists
- List of record labels
