= John Plumb (painter) =

British painter

- Born: John Plumb; 6 February 1927; Luton, Bedfordshire, England
- Died: 6 April 2008 (aged 81); Yarnscombe, Devon, England
- Education: Luton School of Art; Byam Shaw School of Art; Central School of Arts and Crafts
- Known for: Painting
- Notable work: Edgehill (1962)
- Movement: Hard-edge painting, colour field painting
- Spouse: Joan Lawrence (m. 1951)

John Plumb (6 February 1927 – 6 April 2008) was an English abstract painter and art teacher. He was one of the twenty painters in Situation, the 1960 exhibition that brought a large-scale, American-influenced abstraction to prominence in Britain, and taught from the mid-1950s onwards, latterly as senior lecturer in painting at the Central School of Art and Design. From 1977 he worked largely in landscape and figuration before returning to abstraction in the 1990s.

== Early life and education ==
Plumb was born in Luton, England on 6 February 1927, and was brought up there. Before training as an artist he served an apprenticeship at Vauxhall Motors, the town's car manufacturer, as a trainee auto-stylist.

He attended the Byam Shaw School of Art in London. He also studied at the Luton School of Art (1942–45), Byam Shaw School of Art in London (1948–50), and the Central School of Art and Design in London (1952–55), where his teachers included Anthony Gross, Victor Pasmore, William Turnbull and Keith Vaughan. Turnbull became a friend, and both his Guardian and Times obituarists identified him as a lasting influence on Plumb's work.

Plumb exhibited with the New English Art Club in 1948 while still a student, showing a portrait of Joan Lawrence, his future wife; the painting sold, and was noticed favourably in a review in The Observer. While studying in London, Plumb married Joan Lawrence, a long-time close friend.

== Work ==
Plumb's first solo exhibition was at Gallery One, London, in 1957. He later showed with the Marlborough and Axiom galleries, but did not remain long with any dealer, a pattern his obituarists linked to his frequent changes of direction.

Plumb was among the English painters who responded directly to American abstract painting as it reached Europe in the late 1950s. His sympathies lay with large-scale, hard-edge colour-field abstraction; Plumb's Obituarist William Packer argued that the English response to the New York school was independent rather than imitative, and that Plumb's work developed the American precedent on personal terms:

"American criticism has never acknowledged the intelligence and independence that characterised the English response to the New York school. Plumb's own immediate sympathy was with its large-scale, hard-edge colour-field abstraction, a commitment that was to sustain much of his own career. Here was no mere secondary imitation, rather an eager acceptance of new possibilities - of scale, simplicity and directness - to be explored and developed on purely personal terms, in the light of an English background and experience."

In September 1960 Plumb was one of twenty painters in Situation: An Exhibition of British Abstract Painting at the RBA Galleries, London, an artist-organised show. The other exhibitors included Gillian Ayres, Bernard Cohen, Harold Cohen, Robyn Denny, Gordon House, John Hoyland, Gwyther Irwin, Bob Law, Henry Mundy, Richard Smith, Peter Stroud, William Turnbull and Marc Vaux. He took part in the follow-up exhibition of 1961. Situation has been characterised as a break from the landscape-rooted abstraction of the St Ives School in favour of large-scale painting responding to recent American work; the participants became known informally as the Situation Group.

In the early 1960s Plumb built his compositions from coloured adhesive tapes manufactured for the electrical industry, which were obtained for him by the collector E. J. Power. Because the tapes could be lifted and repositioned, the apparent rigour of the finished paintings was arrived at by trial and error. Edgehill (1962, Tate), shown in Situation, is built from stripes of industrial PVC tape; Tate records its medium as acrylic paint, PVC, vinyl and tape on canvas. It was given to the Tate by E. J. Power through the Friends of the Tate Gallery in 1962.

In the late 1960s and early 1970s Plumb worked with systems and chance procedures, laying linear grids and ladder-like structures across the canvas at varying angles, selecting colours at random and employing assistants to apply the acrylic. Packer described him masking or taping grids across one another and applying whatever paint came to hand, pot by pot. Plumb became dissatisfied with the impersonality of this method and in 1977 abandoned abstraction for figuration, and for landscape in particular. He later wrote that abstraction 'would not contain all that was exciting me in the outside world', and described working from drawings, pastels and watercolours made outdoors and distilled into oil paintings in the studio.

Plumb later returned to abstraction in his work. From the mid-1990s Plumb's sight was affected by macular degeneration, and in 1997 he gave up painting; he resumed about two years later, having developed ways of working around the condition. Among these were small, heavily impastoed pictures whose qualities were as much tactile as visual.

The Tate caption for Plumb's later-period work Hydrastructure - What it is which is held in their collection describes him as "one of Britain's most inventive abstract painters" explaining how this work was created: "[it] consists of broad bands of colour dragged across a canvas. Plumb applies the paint with knives and spatulas to allow for chance developments that he then reacts to. These unintended occurrences become a method for developing the character of the work."

Plumb died at Yarnscombe on 6 April 2008, aged 81.

== Teaching ==
Plumb taught at the Luton School of Art (1955–61), the Maidstone College of Art (1961–66) and in America at Bennington College (Vermont, United States, 1968–69). In 1969 he was appointed senior lecturer in painting at the Central School of Art and Design (1969–1982), where he had himself been a student two decades earlier, holding the post for thirteen years. His Independent obituarist wrote that he committed himself to teaching with a single-mindedness that inspired his students but left little time for his own painting."

== Legacy ==
=== Critical reception ===
Art critic and curator Lawrence Alloway praised Plum's works such as Edgehill for their 'tough, lyrical colour sense', and for their dimensionality. In his obituary in The Times Plumb was judged to be one of the most notable abstract painters to emerge in post-war Britain, and it suggests that his work had never been as widely admired as it deserved, attributing this partly to the resurgence of figuration that followed the commercial success of Pop art in the 1960s. In his obituary in the Independent Charles Darwent argued that Plumb's paintings of the Situation period were rooted in everyday materials in a way that Bridget Riley's investigations of perception were not.

=== Collections ===
Tate holds a number of Plum's works: Bermuda (1965), Edgehill (1962, presented by E. J. Power through the Friends of the Tate Gallery, 1962), Untitled August 1969 (1969) and Hydrastructure – What It Is (1992).

The Arts Council Collection holds two of Plumb's works Untitled No.9 (1964) and Bermuda (1965).

The Victoria and Albert Museum holds works including prints and a furnishing fabric Plumb designed for Heal's.

=== Art market ===
In 2007 a colour-field painting of the 1960s sold at Sotheby's for £17,400 against an estimate of £4,000.

== Exhibitions ==
=== Selected solo exhibitions ===
- 1957, Gallery One, London (first solo exhibition)
- 1961, Molton Gallery, London. catalogue introduction by Lawrence Alloway
- 1964, Gallerie Muller, Stuttgart and Marlborough New London Gallery, London
- 1965, Ferens Art Gallery, Hull, UK
- 1967, Arnolfini Gallery, Bristol
- 1968, John Plumb: Recent Paintings, Axiom Gallery, London
- 1970, London Arts Gallery
- 1973, Commonwealth Arts Centre Gallery, London, UK
- 1995 and 1997, Bohun Gallery Henley-on-Thames
- 1997, Landscape to Abstraction – 1985 to 1997 Burton Art Gallery, Bideford, Devon
- 2002, The Atkinson Gallery, Somerset

=== Selected group exhibitions ===
- 1948, New English Art Club, London
- 1953, Artists' International Association abstract exhibition, London
- 1957, Artists' International Association abstract exhibition, London
- 1960, Situation: An Exhibition of British Abstract Painting, RBA Galleries, London
- 1961, Situation, London
- 1961, Group exhibition, Leverkusen, West Germany
- 1963, British Painting in the Sixties, Whitechapel Art Gallery, London
- 1965, Signale, Kunsthalle Basel, Basel
- 1974, British Painting '74, Hayward Gallery, London
- 1990, Art 90, Olympia, London
- 2004, Art & the 60s: This Was Tomorrow, Tate Britain, London
