= Brit Awards =

British popular music awards

The BRIT Awards
- Current: Brit Awards 2026
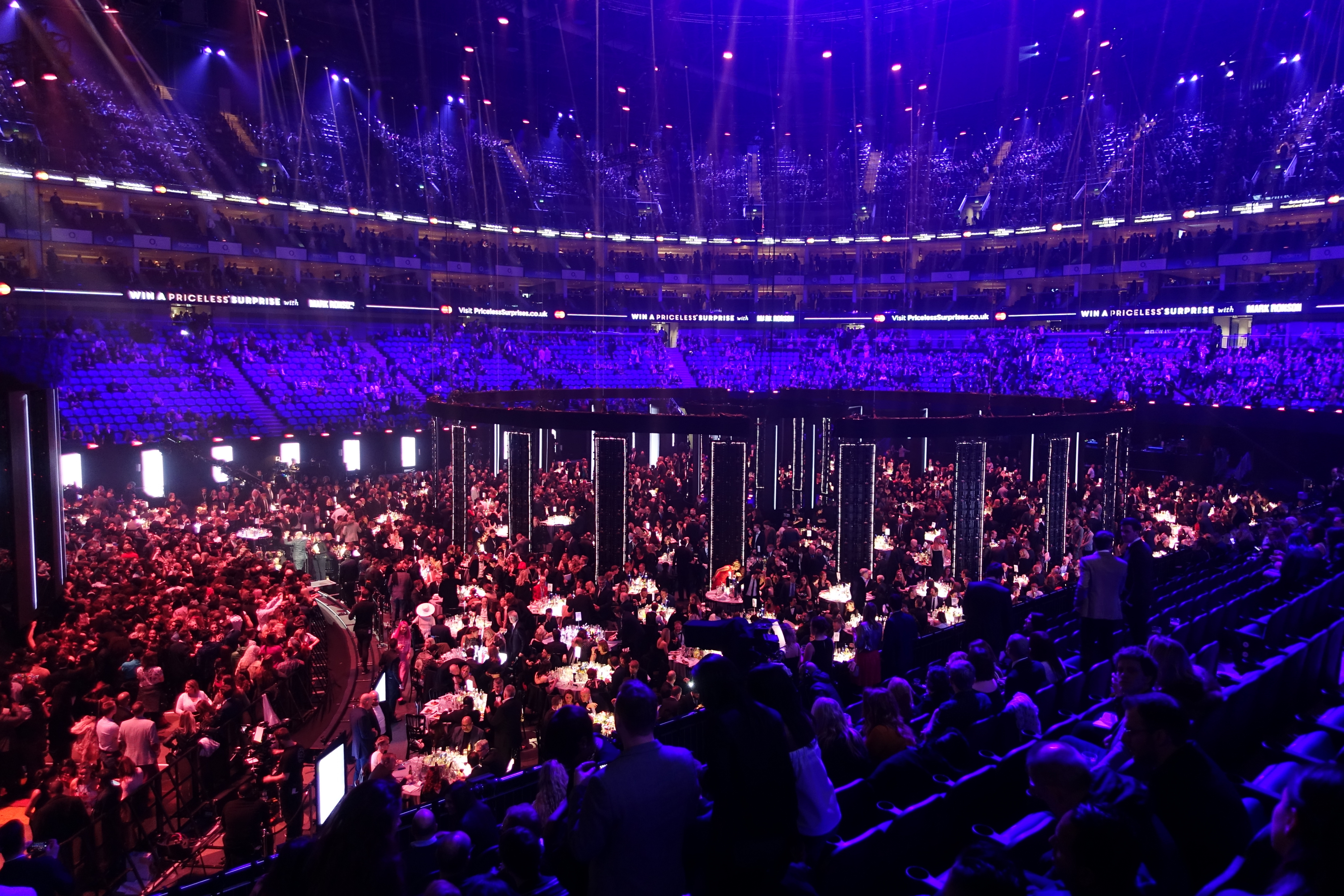
- The O2 Arena in London on the evening of Brit Awards 2016
- Awarded for: Excellence in music
- Country: United Kingdom
- Presented by: British Phonographic Industry (BPI)
- Formerly called: The British Record Industry Britannia Awards
- First award: 18 October 1977; 49 years ago

Highlights
- Most wins: Robbie Williams (13)
- Most nominations: Coldplay (32)
- Website: Official website

Television/radio coverage
- Network: Thames Television (1977); BBC One (1985–1992); ITV (1993–present)

The BRIT Awards (often simply called the BRITs) are the British Phonographic Industry's annual popular music awards. The name was originally a shortened form of "British", "Britain", or "Britannia" (in the early days the awards were sponsored by Britannia Music Club), but subsequently became a backronym for British Record Industry Trusts Show. The awards were first held in 1977 and originated as an annual event in 1982 under the auspices of the British record industry's trade association, the BPI. In 1989, they were renamed The BRIT Awards. Mastercard has been the long-term sponsor of the event. In addition, an equivalent awards ceremony for classical music, called the Classic BRIT Awards, was held annually between 2000 and 2013, before being revived in 2018 but has not been held since.

The highest profile music awards ceremony in the UK, the BRIT Awards have featured some of the most notable events in British popular culture, such as the final public appearance of Freddie Mercury, the Jarvis Cocker protest against Michael Jackson, the height of a high-profile feud between Oasis and fellow Britpop band Blur, the Union Jack dress worn by Geri Halliwell of the Spice Girls, and a Chumbawamba member throwing a bucket of iced water over then-Deputy Prime Minister John Prescott. These moments took place in the 1990s when the ceremony had a reputation for being "a little shambolic, unpredictable and, at times, anarchic," since then it has "evolved into a more polished, sanitised affair".

The BRIT Awards were broadcast live until 1989, when Samantha Fox and Mick Fleetwood hosted a widely criticised show in which little went as rehearsed. From 1990 to 2006, the event was recorded and broadcast the following night. From 2007, The BRIT Awards reverted to a live broadcast on British television, on 14 February on ITV. That year, comedian Russell Brand was the host and three awards were dropped from the ceremony: British Rock Act, British Urban Act and British Pop Act. For the last time, on 16 February 2010, Earls Court in London was the venue for The BRITs. The BRIT Awards were held at the O2 Arena in London for the first time in 2011. In 2026, for the first time in the ceremony's history, it was held outside London at the Co-op Live arena in Manchester.

BRIT Award statuette (silhouette)

The BRIT Award statuette given to the winners features Britannia, the female personification of Britain. Since 2011, the statuette has been regularly redesigned by well known British artists, architects, and designers including Vivienne Westwood, Damien Hirst, Tracey Emin, Peter Blake, Zaha Hadid, Anish Kapoor, David Adjaye, Yinka Ilori and Es Devlin, Pam Hogg, Olaolu Slawn, Rachel Jones, and Matthew Williamson.

Robbie Williams holds the record for the most BRIT Award wins, with 13 as a solo artist and another five as part of Take That. Coldplay holds the record for most BRIT Award nominations, with 32 in total. Little Mix made history at the Brit Awards 2021, when they became the first female group to receive the award at the ceremony. In 2024, English singer-songwriter Raye broke the record for the most nominations and most wins received by a single artist in a year, with seven nominations, and six wins respectively.

== Ceremonies ==
Most recent Brit Award winners
- 28 February 2026
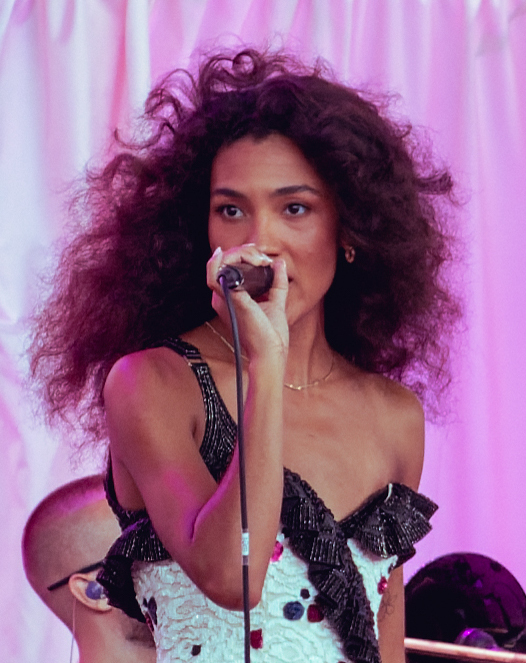

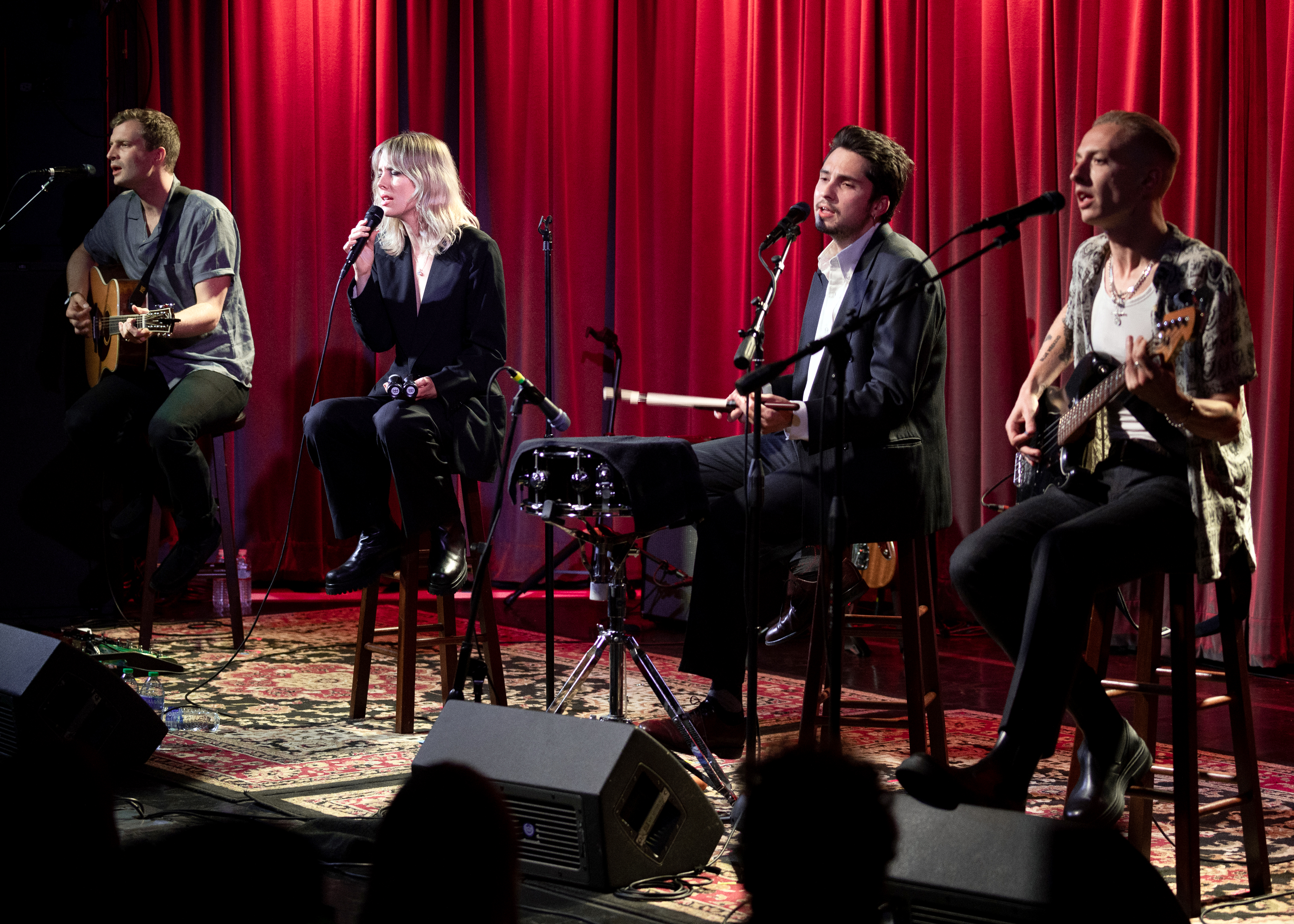

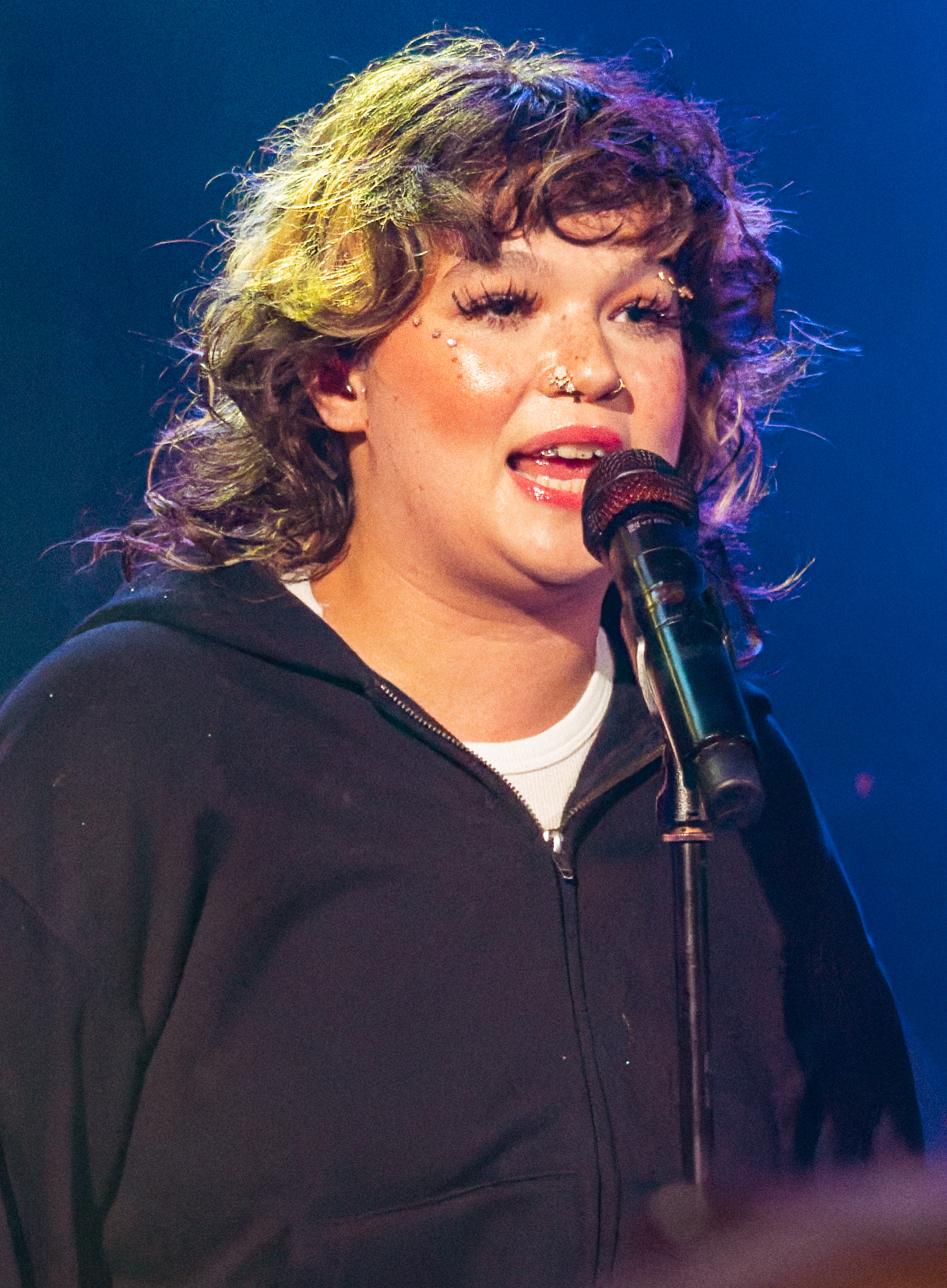

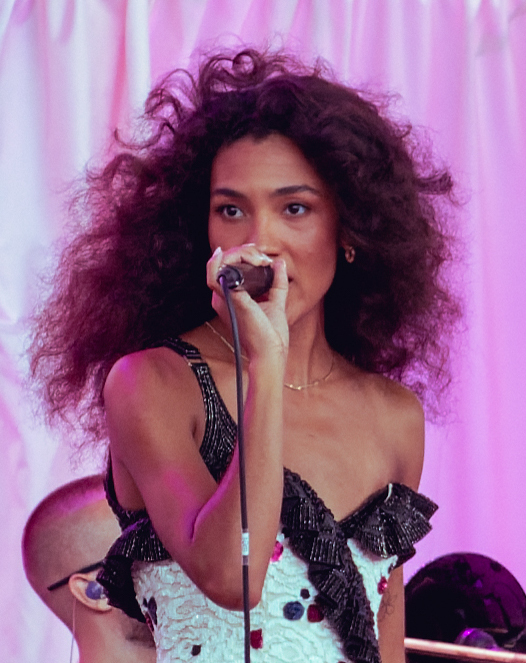
Award	British Artist of the Year	British Group	Best New Artist
Winner	Olivia Dean	Wolf Alice	Lola Young
Award	British Album of the Year	British Single of the Year	Rising Star
Winner	The Art of Loving by Olivia Dean	Rein Me In by Sam Fender & Olivia Dean	Jacob Alon

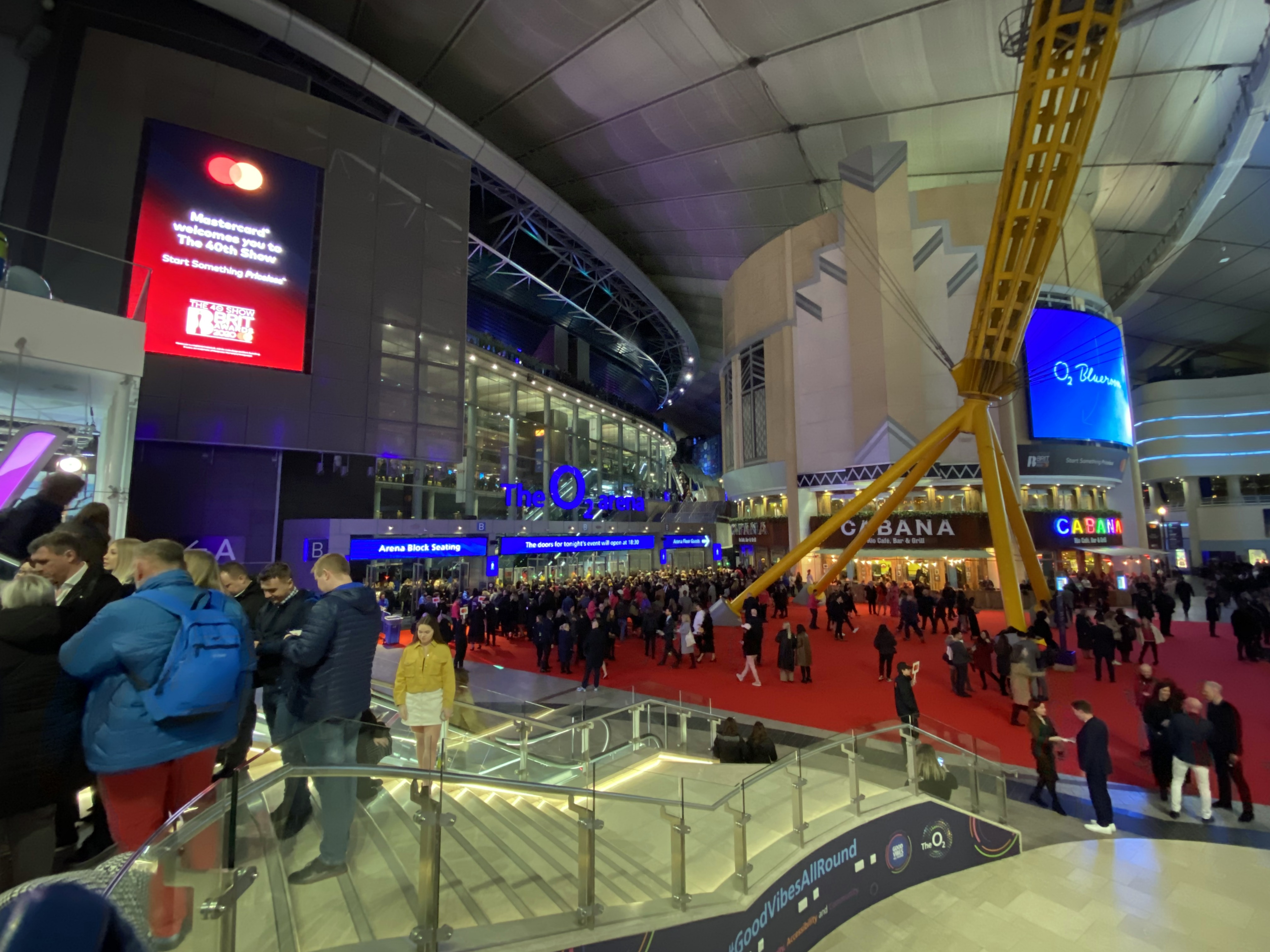
Exterior of The O_{2} Arena in London (host venue from 2011 to 2025) for the 2020 Brit Awards

The first awards ceremony was in 1977, as "The BRITish Record Industry BRITannia Awards", to mark the Queen's Silver Jubilee and was televised by Thames Television. There has been an annual ceremony since 1982.

=== Broadcast ===
The 1988 BPI Awards was the first of the ceremonies to be broadcast on live television. The BBC had previously broadcast the ceremony from 1985, with the shows from 1982 to 1984 not broadcast on television. The BBC continued to broadcast the renamed BRIT Awards, live in 1989 and pre-recorded from 1990 to 1992. ITV have broadcast the awards since 1993, pre-recorded until 2006 and live from 2007 onwards. BBC Radio 1 has provided backstage radio coverage since 2008.

==== Launch show ====
For many years, ITV have aired a launch show in January titled The BRITs Are Coming, which reveals some of the artists who have been nominated at the upcoming ceremony. Previous hosts include Jonathan Ross and Kate Thornton. In 2013 and 2014, it was hosted by Nick Grimshaw, followed by Reggie Yates and Laura Whitmore in 2015 and 2016 respectively. Emma Willis hosted The BRITs Are Coming in 2017 and again in 2018 when it was broadcast live for the first time. Clara Amfo hosted the 2019 launch show and Alice Levine hosted in 2020. Grimshaw hosted the March 2021 edition of The Brits Are Coming with singer Griff. The December 2021 launch show was hosted by Amfo and Maya Jama.

The 2023 edition took place on 11 February 2023 and was held, for the first time, on a weekend. The nominees for 2023 were announced via the BRITs social platforms on 12 January 2023 by Jack Saunders and Vick Hope. The nominees were also revealed by Tom Daley, Yung Filly, Jill Scott, and brothers Joe and George Baggs from Gogglebox across their own social media channels. The launch show returned in January 2024 and was renamed Bring on The BRITs; it was hosted by Yinka Bokinni and live streamed, as part of a new partnership between The BRITs and Meta, via the BRITs account on social platforms Instagram and Facebook. The same format was used in 2025, with that year's launch show hosted by Siân Welby. The 2026 edition was hosted by Sarah Story and Charley Marlowe. Marlowe was also announced to be hosting the red carpet coverage for the main awards ceremony in February 2026 alongside Tyler West.

=== List of ceremonies ===
==== BPI Awards ====
Event	Date	British Album of the Year winner(s)	British Single of the Year winner(s)	Outstanding Contribution to Music / BRITs Icon winner(s)	Host	Venue
1977 (Note: These awards were to mark the Queen's Silver Jubilee and were for the previous 25 years of her reign.)	18 October 1977	Sgt. Pepper's Lonely Hearts Club Band – The Beatles	"Bohemian Rhapsody" – Queen "A Whiter Shade of Pale" – Procol Harum	The Beatles	Michael Aspel	Wembley Conference Centre
1982	4 February 1982	Kings of the Wild Frontier – Adam & the Ants	"Tainted Love" – Soft Cell	John Lennon	David Jacobs	Grosvenor House Hotel
1983	8 February 1983	Memories – Barbra Streisand	"Come on Eileen" – Dexys Midnight Runners	The Beatles	Tim Rice	Grosvenor House Hotel
1984	21 February 1984	Thriller – Michael Jackson	"Karma Chameleon" – Culture Club	George Martin	Tim Rice	Grosvenor House Hotel
1985	11 February 1985	Diamond Life – Sade	"Relax" – Frankie Goes to Hollywood	The Police	Noel Edmonds	Grosvenor House Hotel
1986	10 February 1986	No Jacket Required – Phil Collins	"Everybody Wants to Rule the World" – Tears for Fears	Elton John; Wham!	Noel Edmonds	Grosvenor House Hotel
1987	9 February 1987	Brothers in Arms – Dire Straits	"West End Girls" – Pet Shop Boys	Eric Clapton	Jonathan King	Grosvenor House Hotel
1988	8 February 1988	...Nothing Like the Sun – Sting	"Never Gonna Give You Up" – Rick Astley	The Who	Noel Edmonds	Royal Albert Hall

==== BRITs ====
Event	Date	British Album of the Year winner(s)	British Single of the Year winner(s)	Outstanding Contribution to Music / BRITs Icon winner(s)	Host(s)	Venue
1989	13 February 1989	The First of a Million Kisses – Fairground Attraction	"Perfect" – Fairground Attraction	Cliff Richard	Samantha Fox; Mick Fleetwood	Royal Albert Hall
1990	18 February 1990	The Raw and the Cooked – Fine Young Cannibals	"Another Day in Paradise" – Phil Collins	Queen	Cathy McGowan	Dominion Theatre
1991	10 February 1991	Listen Without Prejudice Vol. 1 – George Michael	"Enjoy the Silence" – Depeche Mode	Status Quo	Simon Bates	Dominion Theatre
1992	12 February 1992	Seal – Seal	"These Are the Days of Our Lives" – Queen	Freddie Mercury	Simon Bates	Hammersmith Odeon
1993	16 February 1993	Diva – Annie Lennox	"Could It Be Magic" – Take That	Rod Stewart	Richard O'Brien	Alexandra Palace
1994	14 February 1994	Connected – Stereo MC's	"Pray" – Take That	Van Morrison	Elton John; RuPaul	Alexandra Palace
1995	20 February 1995	Parklife – Blur	"Parklife" – Blur ft. Phil Daniels	Elton John	Chris Evans	Alexandra Palace
1996	19 February 1996	(What's the Story) Morning Glory? – Oasis	"Back for Good" – Take That	David Bowie	Chris Evans	Earls Court
1997	24 February 1997	Everything Must Go – Manic Street Preachers	"Wannabe" – Spice Girls	Bee Gees	Ben Elton	Earls Court
1998	9 February 1998	Urban Hymns – The Verve	"Never Ever" – All Saints	Fleetwood Mac	Ben Elton	London Arena
1999	16 February 1999	This Is My Truth Tell Me Yours – Manic Street Preachers	"Angels" – Robbie Williams	Eurythmics	Johnny Vaughan	London Arena
2000	3 March 2000	The Man Who – Travis	"She's the One" – Robbie Williams	Spice Girls	Davina McCall	Earls Court Two
2001	26 February 2001	Parachutes – Coldplay	"Rock DJ" – Robbie Williams	U2	Ant & Dec	Earls Court Two
2002	20 February 2002	No Angel – Dido	"Don't Stop Movin'" – S Club 7	Sting	Frank Skinner; Zoe Ball	Earls Court Two
2003	20 February 2003	A Rush of Blood to the Head – Coldplay	"Just a Little" – Liberty X	Tom Jones	Davina McCall	Earls Court Two
2004	17 February 2004	Permission to Land – The Darkness	"White Flag" – Dido	Duran Duran	Cat Deeley	Earls Court Two
2005	9 February 2005	Hopes and Fears – Keane	"Your Game" – Will Young	Bob Geldof	Chris Evans	Earls Court Two
2006	14 February 2006	X&Y – Coldplay	"Speed of Sound" – Coldplay	Paul Weller	Chris Evans	Earls Court
2007	14 February 2007	Whatever People Say I Am, That's What I'm Not – Arctic Monkeys	"Patience" – Take That	Oasis	Russell Brand	Earls Court
2008	20 February 2008	Favourite Worst Nightmare – Arctic Monkeys	"Shine" – Take That	Paul McCartney	The Osbournes	Earls Court
2009	18 February 2009	Rockferry – Duffy	"The Promise" – Girls Aloud	Pet Shop Boys	Kylie Minogue; James Corden; Mathew Horne	Earls Court
2010	16 February 2010	Lungs – Florence and the Machine	"Beat Again" – JLS	Robbie Williams	Peter Kay	Earls Court
2011	15 February 2011	Sigh No More – Mumford & Sons	"Pass Out" – Tinie Tempah ft. Labrinth	—N/a	James Corden	The O2 Arena
2012	21 February 2012	21 – Adele	"What Makes You Beautiful" – One Direction	Blur	James Corden	The O2 Arena
2013	20 February 2013	Our Version of Events – Emeli Sandé	"Skyfall" – Adele	—N/a	James Corden	The O2 Arena
2014	19 February 2014	AM – Arctic Monkeys	"Waiting All Night" – Rudimental ft. Ella Eyre	Elton John (Note: Given at a separate show at the London Palladium theatre the previous October.)	James Corden	The O2 Arena
2015	25 February 2015	X – Ed Sheeran	"Uptown Funk" – Mark Ronson ft. Bruno Mars	—N/a	Ant & Dec	The O2 Arena
2016	24 February 2016	25 – Adele	"Hello" – Adele	David Bowie	Ant & Dec	The O2 Arena
2017	22 February 2017	Blackstar – David Bowie	"Shout Out to My Ex" – Little Mix	Robbie Williams (Note: Given at a separate show at the Troxy theatre the previous November.)	Dermot O'Leary; Emma Willis	The O2 Arena
2018	21 February 2018	Gang Signs & Prayer – Stormzy	"Human" – Rag'n'Bone Man	—N/a	Jack Whitehall	The O2 Arena
2019	20 February 2019	A Brief Inquiry into Online Relationships – The 1975	"One Kiss" – Calvin Harris and Dua Lipa	P!nk	Jack Whitehall	The O2 Arena
2020	18 February 2020	Psychodrama – Dave	"Someone You Loved" – Lewis Capaldi	—N/a	Jack Whitehall	The O2 Arena
2021	11 May 2021	Future Nostalgia – Dua Lipa	"Watermelon Sugar" – Harry Styles	Taylor Swift	Jack Whitehall	The O2 Arena
2022	8 February 2022	30 – Adele	"Easy on Me" – Adele	—N/a	Mo Gilligan	The O2 Arena
2023	11 February 2023	Harry's House – Harry Styles	"As It Was" – Harry Styles	—N/a	Mo Gilligan	The O2 Arena
2024	2 March 2024	My 21st Century Blues – Raye	"Escapism" – Raye ft. 070 Shake	Kylie Minogue	Clara Amfo; Maya Jama; Roman Kemp	The O2 Arena
2025	1 March 2025	Brat – Charli XCX	"Guess" – Charli XCX ft. Billie Eilish	—N/a	Jack Whitehall	The O2 Arena
2026	28 February 2026	The Art of Loving – Olivia Dean	"Rein Me In" – Sam Fender & Olivia Dean	Mark Ronson	Jack Whitehall	Co-op Live

== Notable moments ==
=== Electricians' strike (1987) ===
In 1987 the BPI Awards ceremony was held in the Great Room at the Grosvenor House Hotel. At the time there was a BBC electricians' strike in effect, and the organisers decided to use a non-TV events production company, called Upfront, to manage the show. Despite the show being picketed, the event was transmitted as intended. For a while, the outdoor broadcast scanner was rocked on its wheels by the protesters and they managed to shut off the power to one of the big GE video screen projectors. Upfront was then asked to organise the following year and persuaded the BPI to move the event to a larger venue, starting the trend that continues to this day, albeit at The O2, and with a different production company (MJK Productions).

=== Samantha Fox and Mick Fleetwood (1989) ===
In 1989, the ceremony was broadcast live and presented by Fleetwood Mac's Mick Fleetwood and singer Samantha Fox. The inexperience of the hosts, an ineffective autocue, and little preparation combined to create an unprofessional show that was poorly received. The hosts continually got their lines mixed up, a pre-recorded message from Michael Jackson was never transmitted and several guest stars arrived late on stage or at the wrong time, such as Boy George in place of The Four Tops.

=== Andy Bell and Boy George embrace (1989) ===
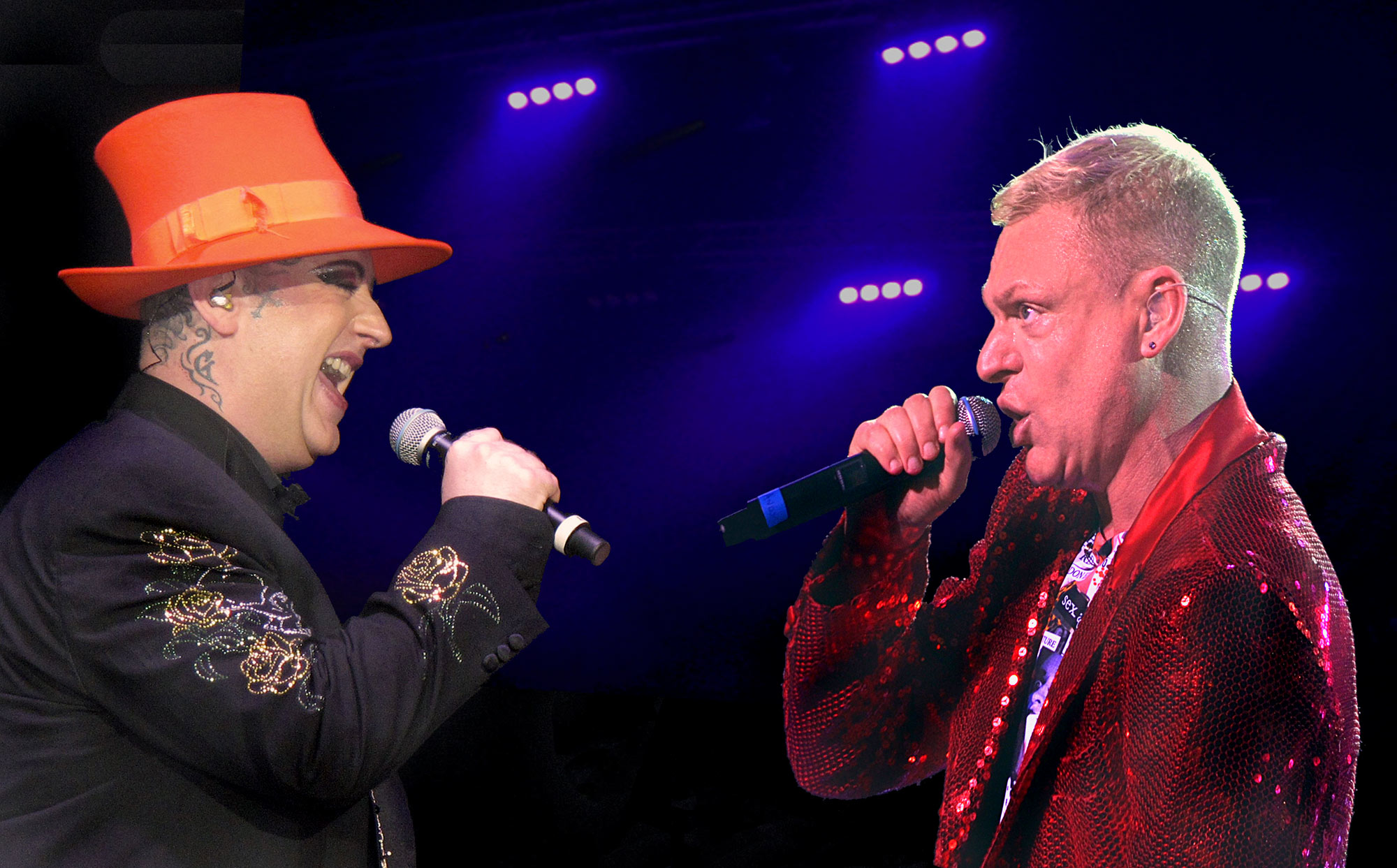
Boy George and Andy Bell of Erasure (pictured in 2011) kissed on stage at the Brit Awards 1989 to cheers from the crowd.

In accepting the award for British Group from Boy George at the 1989 awards, Andy Bell of Erasure kissed George on stage to cheers from the crowd, with Bell stating it was an act in protest against Section 28 introduced by Margaret Thatcher's Conservative government that prohibited the "promotion" of homosexuality in schools.

=== Freddie Mercury's final public appearance (1990) ===
The 1990 awards ceremony saw the last public appearance of Queen frontman Freddie Mercury. Queen appeared at the ceremony to receive the Outstanding Contribution to Music. Mercury (who had been suffering from AIDS since 1987 but had not disclosed it to the public) did not make a speech, as Brian May did the talking on behalf of the other members, but his gaunt appearance was noticeable.

=== The KLF (1992) ===
In 1992, dance/art band The KLF was awarded Best British Group (shared with Simply Red) and were booked to open the show. In an attempt to hijack the event, the duo collaborated with grindcore metal band Extreme Noise Terror to perform a death metal version of the dance song "3 a.m. Eternal", complete with flame-throwers, and ending with Bill Drummond firing blanks from a vintage machine gun over the audience. KLF publicist/announcer Scott Piering stated "Ladies and gentlemen, The KLF have now left the music business". The performance prompted conductor Sir Georg Solti to walk out in disgust. Producers of the show then refused to let a motorcycle courier collect the award on behalf of the band. Later that evening, the KLF dumped a dead sheep outside the venue of an after-show party, and later buried their BRIT Award statuette at Stonehenge signifying their abhorrence of the music industry.

=== Michael Jackson and Jarvis Cocker (1996) ===
In 1996, Michael Jackson was given a special Artist of a Generation award. At the ceremony he accompanied his single "Earth Song" with a stage show, culminating with Jackson as a 'Christ-like figure' surrounded by children. Jarvis Cocker, of the band Pulp, mounted the stage in what he would later claim as a protest at this portion of the performance. Cocker ran across the stage, lifting his shirt and pointing his (clothed) backside in Jackson's direction. Cocker was subsequently questioned by the police but was told he would not be prosecuted.

Regarding his actions, Cocker said, "My actions were a form of protest at the way Michael Jackson sees himself as some kind of Christ-like figure with the power of healing. I just ran on the stage. I didn't make any contact with anyone as far as I recall."

=== Oasis and Blur rivalry (1996) ===
1996 saw the height of a feud between Britpop bands Oasis and Blur. The differing styles of the bands, coupled with their prominence within the Britpop movement, led the British media to seize upon the rivalry between the bands. Both factions played along, with the Gallaghers taunting Blur at the 1996 BRIT Awards by singing a rendition of "Parklife" when they collected their award for Best British Group (with Liam Gallagher changing the lyrics to "Shite-life" and Noel Gallagher changing them to "Marmite").

=== Chumbawamba and John Prescott (1998) ===
"There's no denying they're a lot slicker, a lot tamer now than they were in their '80s and '90s heyday. Will we ever see another stage invasion, a politician getting a soaking, or one of the country's biggest stars offering another out for a fight? Probably not."

— Gemma Peplow, entertainment reporter for Sky News, Brit Awards 2021: From Geri to Jarvis – the biggest moments in show's history.

In 1998, Danbert Nobacon of the band Chumbawamba emptied a bucket of iced water over then-Deputy Prime Minister John Prescott. Despite apologies on behalf of the band from EMI Europe, Chumbawamba were unrepentant, saying, "If John Prescott has the nerve to turn up at events like the Brit Awards in a vain attempt to make Labour seem cool and trendy, then he deserves all we can throw at him."

=== Russell Brand (2007) ===
The host of the 2007 awards ceremony, comedian Russell Brand made several quips relating to news stories of the time including Robbie Williams entering rehab for addiction to prescription drugs, the Queen's 'naughty bits' and a fatal friendly fire incident involving a British soldier killed by American armed forces in Iraq. ITV received over 300 complaint calls from viewers. He would again instigate controversy the following year at the 2008 MTV Video Music Awards.

=== Adele speech cut short (2012) ===
Adele won the British Album of the Year widely regarded as the most coveted award. Less than half a minute into her acceptance speech, host James Corden was forced to cut Adele off in order to introduce Blur who were due to perform an eleven-minute set as they had received the Outstanding Contribution to Music and the ceremony was running over its allotted time. Adele was visibly annoyed and proceeded to raise her middle finger and the producers of the show came under fire on Twitter for the decision. Following the incident Adele said "I got cut off during my speech for Best Album and I flung the middle finger. But that finger was to the suits at The BRIT Awards, not to my fans". Adele received an apology from the show's organisers, who stated; "We send our deepest apologies to Adele that her big moment was cut short. We don't want this to undermine her incredible achievement in winning our night's biggest award. It tops off what's been an incredible year for her." Due to the tight schedule, only three of the five songs Blur played were broadcast on ITV.

=== Alex Turner speech (2014) ===
In 2014 Arctic Monkeys won the British Album of the Year. When the band got up on stage to receive the award, lead singer Alex Turner, started his speech by testing the mic and then talked about the cyclical nature of rock music, saying that even if its popularity declines it will never die as a music genre, while the rest of the band laughed in the background. He ended the speech by saying, "Invoice me for the microphone if you need to", dropped it to the ground, and left the stage. That night they became the first act to win both British Album and British Group three times. The speech divided both press and audience, being labeled as both "pretentious twaddle" and a sincere defence of the genre, as well as garnering reactions from other musicians, with Johnny Marr saying it was "quite poetic".

When asked a few days later, Turner said, "In public, I'm a quiet guy, so doing anything in front of lots of people always makes me nervous. I'm known for my music, not how well I deliver a speech. People always assume if you're in a band that's been on the scene for ages that you're going to be really confident, but that's not true at all." In a 2016 interview with Rolling Stone, he re-addressed the speech, "A lot of people thought I was waffling away on drugs, but I wasn't. I just can't pretend getting an award was something I've dreamed about since I was a kid, because it isn't." In 2022 when an interviewer implied the speech was akin to performance art, Turner seemed to agree. Wet Leg's singer Rhian Teasdale quoted part of Turner's speech, during the 2023 ceremony, as the band won New Artist.

=== David Bowie enters Scottish independence debate (2014) ===
At 67 years of age, musician David Bowie became the oldest recipient of now defunct British Male Solo Artist. Bowie used his acceptance speech, delivered in his absence by Kate Moss, to urge Scotland to remain part of the UK in the September 2014 Scottish independence referendum. His speech read: "I'm completely delighted to have a Brit for being the best male – but I am, aren't I Kate? Yes. I think it's a great way to end the day. Thank you very, very much and Scotland stay with us." Bowie's unusual intervention in British politics garnered a significant reaction throughout the UK on social media.

=== Little Mix Best British Group win and speech (2021) ===
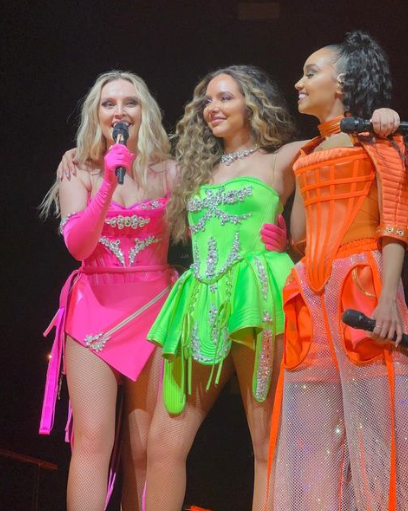
2021 winners Little Mix

In 2021, Little Mix's win for British Group marked the first time that a girl group had won that award since it was first introduced in 1977. The group used their acceptance speech to call out white male dominance, misogyny, sexism and lack of diversity in the industry. Fellow group member Leigh-Anne Pinnock stated "It's not easy being a female in the UK pop industry. We've all seen the white male dominance, misogyny, sexism, and lack of diversity. We're proud of how we've stuck together, stood for our group, surrounded ourselves with strong women, and are now using our voices more than ever."

Little Mix also called out the awards ceremony for the lack of nominations and wins for female groups in the category. This is despite the Brit Awards voters including 1,000+ members of the music industry (see Voting Procedure, below), and more than 50% of the music workforce 'identifying as female' for a number of years. They also paid homage to previous "female bands" including the Spice Girls, Sugababes, All Saints, and Girls Aloud etc, who all had made significant contributions to pop culture in the UK but were overlooked by the Brit Awards.

=== Raye sets a new record (2024) ===
At the Brit Awards 2024, English singer-songwriter Raye received seven nominations, making her the most nominated artist in a single year breaking a record held by Gorillaz, Craig David and Robbie Williams. Furthermore, she broke the record for the most wins received in a single night with six in total.

== Notable performances ==
=== Spice Girls' performance of "Wannabe" and "Who Do You Think You Are" (1997) ===
Ginger Spice, Geri Halliwell, wore a Union Jack dress. Spicemania was at its height in the UK and the Spice Girls had just cracked the US as well, reaching Number 1 with their debut single and album. Halliwell was originally going to wear an all-black dress, but she thought it was too boring, so her sister sewed on a Union Jack tea towel, with a 'peace' sign on the back. The now iconic red, white and blue mini-dress was worn during the Spice Girls' performance of their Number 1 song "Who Do You Think You Are". In 1998 she sold her dress in a charity auction to Hard Rock Cafe in Las Vegas for a record £41,320, giving Halliwell the Guinness World Record for the most expensive piece of pop star clothing ever sold. This performance won the Spice Girls the award for "BRITs Hits 30 – Best Live Performance at The BRIT Awards" at the 2010 BRIT Awards, with Samantha Fox presenting the award to Geri Halliwell and Mel B.

=== Geri Halliwell's performance of "Bag It Up" (2000) ===
Three years following the iconic Spice Girls performance, Halliwell, now a solo artist, performed her new single "Bag It Up" at the 2000 BRIT Awards. The performance featured Halliwell emerging, whilst dancing on with a pole, from a pair of large inflatable female legs. As the performance continued, her male backing dancers stripped to their pink briefs whilst dancing with the Union Jack flag. It is widely believed that Halliwell lip-synced her performance. In addition to all this, the performance is famous for being performed on the same night that the Spice Girls received the award for Outstanding Contribution to Music, which Halliwell declined to accept with her former bandmates.

=== Gorillaz's performance of "Clint Eastwood" (2002) ===
When it was announced that past Brit Award recipient Damon Albarn, and his project Gorillaz, would be taking the stage at the 2002 Brit Awards, no one knew what to expect. The four cartoon members of the band performed the song on giant life size screens (an early version of a 3D hologram) without the Blur frontman being present at all. The band performed their hit single "Clint Eastwood" alongside UK underground rap group Phi Life Cypher and a group of silhouetted female dancers mimicking the zombies from the band's music video. The performance received rapturous cheers and applause.

=== Kylie Minogue's performance of "Can't Get You Out of My Head" (2002) ===
Shortly after Gorillaz at the same 2002 Brit Awards, Kylie Minogue, who was promoting her Fever album at the time, performed her chart-topping song "Can't Get You Out of My Head" mashed-up with elements of New Order's song "Blue Monday". Minogue entered the performance as an ejected CD emerging from a CD player, while copying the pose from the Fever album cover. It was named as the most iconic Brits entrance by Huffington Post UK, and was featured on The Guardian as one of the 50 key events of dance music in 2011. The white-mini dress by Dolce & Gabbana was also retrospectively hailed as an "iconic fashion moment" by I-D. Reflecting on the performance years later, Minogue called it her "ultimate" favorite performance, saying: "That has to be the ultimate, being ejected from a CD player. I look back at that and think I don’t know about health and safety, but that would be my ultimate."

=== Girls Aloud's performance of "The Promise" (2009) ===
English-Irish girl group Girls Aloud marked their first ever performance at the 2009 ceremony, by performing their single "The Promise". The performance saw the members, Cheryl Cole, Kimberley Walsh, Sarah Harding, Nicola Roberts and Nadine Coyle appear as though they were naked, with their modesty being covered by pink feather fans. This performance was nominated in the 2010 ceremony for the "BRITs Hits 30 – Best Live Performance at The BRIT Awards", alongside Oasis and The Who, which the Spice Girls eventually went on to win.

=== Adele's performance of "Someone like You" (2011) ===
Adele performed her song "Someone like You" at the 2011 BRITs with only a piano accompanying her. Her emotional performance was received with a standing ovation at the O2 Arena and the video has received 187 million views so far on YouTube. The performance launched "Someone Like You" 46 spots up the UK charts to Number 1, and in the process, made Adele the first artist in the UK since the Beatles to have two top five singles and two top five albums at the same time. The performance had all lights down and focused on Adele and her piano.

=== Madonna's performance of "Living for Love" (2015) ===
Madonna's live return to BRIT Awards after 20 years was widely promoted in the media in the days leading up to the ceremony and during the show itself. During the performance of "Living for Love", she walked onstage wearing an oversized cape. When standing on stairs situated on the stage, the cape's cord failed to separate, so when Madonna's backing dancer pulled the cape behind her, she fell down the stairs and noticeably hit the stage hard. She paused momentarily as her backing music continued, before she managed to separate herself from the cape and then continued performing. In an interview on The Jonathan Ross Show, Madonna blamed her fall on a wardrobe malfunction as her cape had been tied too tightly so it could not be unfastened in time, before adding: "I had a little bit of whiplash, I smacked the back of my head. And I had a man standing over me with a flashlight until about 3am to make sure I was compos mentis. I know how to fall, I have fallen off my horse many times."

=== Katy Perry and Skip Marley's performance of "Chained to the Rhythm" (2017) ===
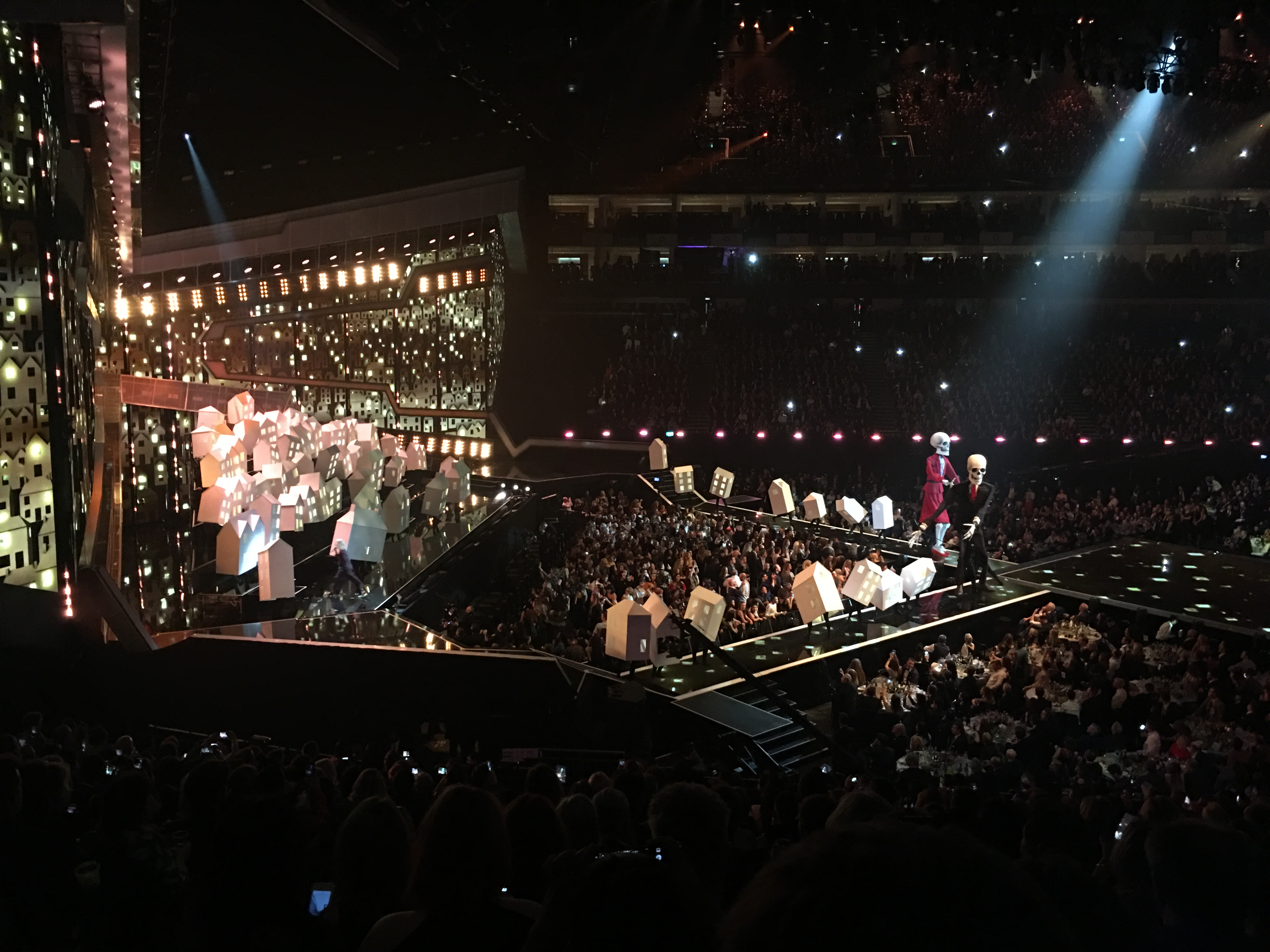
Katy Perry performing on stage at the 2017 Brit Awards

In the leadup to the 2016 U.S. presidential election, Katy Perry was a major endorsement for Democratic candidate Hillary Clinton, performing at many of her rallies and speaking at public events. After Donald Trump won the election, Perry returned to recording her fifth studio album and in February 2017 released "Chained to the Rhythm". During the performance, she was joined onstage by two large skeletal puppets dressed as Trump and British Prime Minister Theresa May. The performance was also notable as a backing dancer fell offstage at the end of the performance whilst wearing a house costume.

== Categories ==
=== Current ===
- British Album of the Year
- British Artist of the Year
- British Song of the Year
- British Producer of the Year
- British Group
- Best New Artist
- Songwriter of the Year
- British Pop Act
- British Dance Act
- British R&B Act
- British Rock/Alternative Act
- British Hip Hop/Grime/Rap Act
- Rising Star Award
- International Artist
- International Group
- International Song

=== Defunct ===
- British Artist Video of the Year (1985–2019)
- British Male Solo Artist (1977, 1982–2021)
- British Female Solo Artist (1977, 1982–2021)
- British Live Act (2005–2009, 2013)
- Classical Recording (1982–1993)
- Classical Soloist Album (1977)
- Comedy Recording (1985)
- International Album (1977, 2002–2011)
- International Male Solo Artist (1989–2021)
- International Female Solo Artist (1989–2021)
- International Breakthrough Act (1988–2012)
- Non-Musical Recording (1977)
- Orchestral Album (1977)
- Soundtrack/Cast Recording (1985–2001)

=== Special ===
- Artist of a Generation (1996)
- Biggest Selling Album Act (1998)
- Biggest Selling Album & Single of 1993 (1994)
- Biggest Selling Live Act of 1999 (2000)
- Brit Billion Award (2023–present)
- British Album of 30 Year (2010)
- British Song of 25 Year (2005)
- Freddie Mercury Award (1996, 1998–1999)
- Global Success Award (2013–2019, 2025)
- Icon Award (2014, 2016–2017, 2021, 2024)
- Lifetime Achievement Award (1983, 1989)
- Live Performance of 30 Year (2010)
- Most Successful Live Act (1993)
- Outstanding Contribution to Music (1977, 1982–1988, 1990–2010, 2012, 2019)
- Sony Trophy Award for Technical Excellence (1983–1984)
- Special Award (1983, 1985)
- Special Recognition (2013)

== Voting procedure ==
According to The BRIT Awards website, the list of eligible artists, albums, and singles is compiled by the Official Charts Company and submitted to the voting academy, which consists of over 1,000 members of the music industry, including the previous year's nominees and winners. The voters use a secure online website to vote, and the voting is scrutinized by Electoral Reform Services. The concept of fan voting was abolished after the 2019 Brit Awards, but brought back in 2022.

== Performances ==
Coldplay are the act with the most performances, opening the ceremony five times and presenting eight overall. They are followed by Take That and band member Robbie Williams, who performed seven times each. Adele has performed in five editions, the most among women.

Year	Performers
1985	Alison Moyet, Bronski Beat, Howard Jones, Nik Kershaw and Tina Turner
1986	Huey Lewis and the News, Kate Bush, Phil Collins and Tears for Fears
1987	Chris de Burgh, Curiosity Killed the Cat, Five Star, Level 42, Simply Red, Spandau Ballet and Whitney Houston
1988	Bananarama, Bee Gees, Chris Rea, Pet Shop Boys with Dusty Springfield, Rick Astley, Terence Trent D'Arby, T'Pau and The Who
1989	Bros, Def Leppard, Fairground Attraction, Gloria Estefan and Miami Sound Machine, Randy Newman, Tanita Tikaram and Yazz
1990	Lisa Stansfield, Neneh Cherry, Nigel Kennedy, Phil Collins and Soul II Soul
1991	EMF, The Beautiful South and Status Quo
1992	The KLF, Extreme Noise Terror, Lisa Stansfield, Beverley Craven and P.M. Dawn
1993	Suede, Peter Gabriel, Cirque du Soleil, Bill Wyman and Madness
1994	Björk, PJ Harvey, Bon Jovi, Brian May, Dina Carroll, Elton John, Meatloaf, Pet Shop Boys, Stereo MCs, Take That, Van Morrison and Shane MacGowan
1995	Blur, East 17, Eddi Reader, Elton John, Eternal, Sting, M People, Madonna and Take That
1996	Alanis Morissette, David Bowie, Pet Shop Boys, Michael Jackson, Pulp, Simply Red and Take That
1997	Bee Gees, Diana Ross, Jamiroquai, The Fugees, Manic Street Preachers, Mark Morrison, Prince, Sheryl Crow, Skunk Anansie and Spice Girls
1998	All Saints, Chumbawamba, Finlay Quaye, Fleetwood Mac, Robbie Williams, Tom Jones, Shola Ama, Spice Girls, Texas, Method Man and The Verve
1999	Joint performance with ABBA medley (B*Witched, Billie Piper, Cleopatra, Steps, Tina Cousins), Boyzone, The Corrs, David Bowie, Placebo, Eurythmics, Stevie Wonder, Manic Street Preachers, Robbie Williams and Whitney Houston
2000	Basement Jaxx, 5ive, Queen, Geri Halliwell, Macy Gray, Ricky Martin, Spice Girls, Stereophonics, Tom Jones, Travis and Will Smith
2001	Coldplay, Craig David, Destiny's Child, Eminem, Hear'Say, Robbie Williams, Sonique, Westlife and U2
2002	Anastacia, Jamiroquai, Dido, Gorillaz, Kylie Minogue, Mis-Teeq, Shaggy, Ali G, So Solid Crew, Sting and The Strokes
2003	Avril Lavigne, Blue, Coldplay, David Gray, George Michael, Ms Dynamite, Justin Timberlake, Kylie Minogue, Liberty X, Pink, Sugababes and Tom Jones
2004	50 Cent, Beyoncé, Muse, Black Eyed Peas, Busted, Alicia Keys, Gwen Stefani, Missy Elliott, Jamie Cullum, Amy Winehouse, Katie Melua and Duran Duran
2005	Daniel Bedingfield, Natasha Bedingfield, Franz Ferdinand, Green Day, Gwen Stefani, Jamelia, Lemar, Keane, Snoop Dogg, Pharrell Williams, Scissor Sisters, Bob Geldof, Robbie Williams and The Streets
2006	Coldplay, KT Tunstall, Kaiser Chiefs, James Blunt, Kanye West, Kelly Clarkson, Gorillaz, Jack Johnson, Paul Weller and Prince
2007	Scissor Sisters, Snow Patrol, Amy Winehouse, The Killers, Take That, Red Hot Chili Peppers, Corinne Bailey Rae and Oasis
2008	Mika, Beth Ditto, Rihanna, Klaxons, Kylie Minogue, Kaiser Chiefs, Leona Lewis, Mark Ronson, Adele, Daniel Merriweather, Amy Winehouse and Paul McCartney
2009	U2, Girls Aloud, Coldplay, Duffy, Take That, Kings of Leon, The Ting Tings, Estelle, Pet Shop Boys, Lady Gaga and Brandon Flowers
2010	Lily Allen, JLS, Kasabian, Lady Gaga, Florence + the Machine, Dizzee Rascal, Jay-Z, Alicia Keys, Cheryl Cole and Robbie Williams
2011	Take That, Adele, Rihanna, Mumford & Sons, Plan B, Arcade Fire, Tinie Tempah, Eric Turner, Labrinth, Cee Lo Green and Paloma Faith
2012	Coldplay, Florence + the Machine, Olly Murs, Rizzle Kicks, Ed Sheeran, Noel Gallagher's High Flying Birds, Chris Martin, Adele, Bruno Mars, Rihanna and Blur
2013	Muse, Robbie Williams, Justin Timberlake, Taylor Swift, One Direction, Ben Howard, Mumford & Sons and Emeli Sandé
2014	Arctic Monkeys, Katy Perry, Bruno Mars, Beyoncé, Disclosure, Lorde, Aluna Francis, Ellie Goulding, Bastille, Rudimental, Ella Eyre, Pharrell Williams and Nile Rodgers
2015	Taylor Swift, Sam Smith, Royal Blood, Ed Sheeran, Kanye West, Allan Kingdom, Theophilus London, Take That, George Ezra, Paloma Faith and Madonna
2016	Coldplay, Justin Bieber, James Bay, Jess Glynne, Rihanna, SZA, Drake, Little Mix, The Spiders from Mars, Lorde, The Weeknd and Adele
2017	Little Mix, Bruno Mars, Emeli Sandé, The 1975, Chris Martin, Katy Perry, Skip Marley, Skepta, The Chainsmokers, Coldplay, Ed Sheeran, Stormzy and Robbie Williams
2018	Justin Timberlake, Chris Stapleton, Rag'n'Bone Man, Jorja Smith, Dua Lipa, Ed Sheeran, Foo Fighters, Liam Gallagher, Sam Smith, Kendrick Lamar, Rita Ora, Liam Payne and Stormzy
2019	Hugh Jackman, George Ezra, Little Mix, Ms Banks, Jorja Smith, Calvin Harris, Rag'n'Bone Man, Sam Smith, Dua Lipa, Jess Glynne, H.E.R., The 1975, Pink and Dan Smith
2020	Mabel, Lewis Capaldi, Harry Styles, Lizzo, Dave, Billie Eilish, Celeste, Stormzy, Burna Boy and Rod Stewart
2021	Coldplay, Dua Lipa, Olivia Rodrigo, Arlo Parks, Years & Years, Elton John, The Weeknd, Griff, Headie One, AJ Tracey, Young T & Bugsey, Rag'n'Bone Man, Pink and Lewisham and Greenwich NHS Choir
2022	Ed Sheeran, Bring Me the Horizon, Anne-Marie, KSI, Digital Farm Animals, Little Simz, Emma Corrin, Liam Gallagher, Holly Humberstone, Adele, Sam Fender, Dave, Fredo, Ghetts and Giggs
2023	Sam Smith, Kim Petras, Wet Leg, Lewis Capaldi, Lizzo, Harry Styles, Stormzy, Cat Burns, David Guetta, Becky Hill, Ella Henderson, Sam Ryder
2024	Dua Lipa, Calvin Harris, Ellie Goulding, Tate McRae, Jungle, Raye, Becky Hill, Chase & Status, Rema, Kylie Minogue
2025	Sabrina Carpenter, Teddy Swims, Myles Smith, JADE, The Last Dinner Party, Lola Young, Sam Fender, Ezra Collective, Jorja Smith
2026	Harry Styles, Olivia Dean, Mark Ronson, Wolf Alice, Rosalía, K-Pop Demon Hunters, sombr, Alex Warren, RAYE

== Milestones ==
=== Most wins by British acts ===
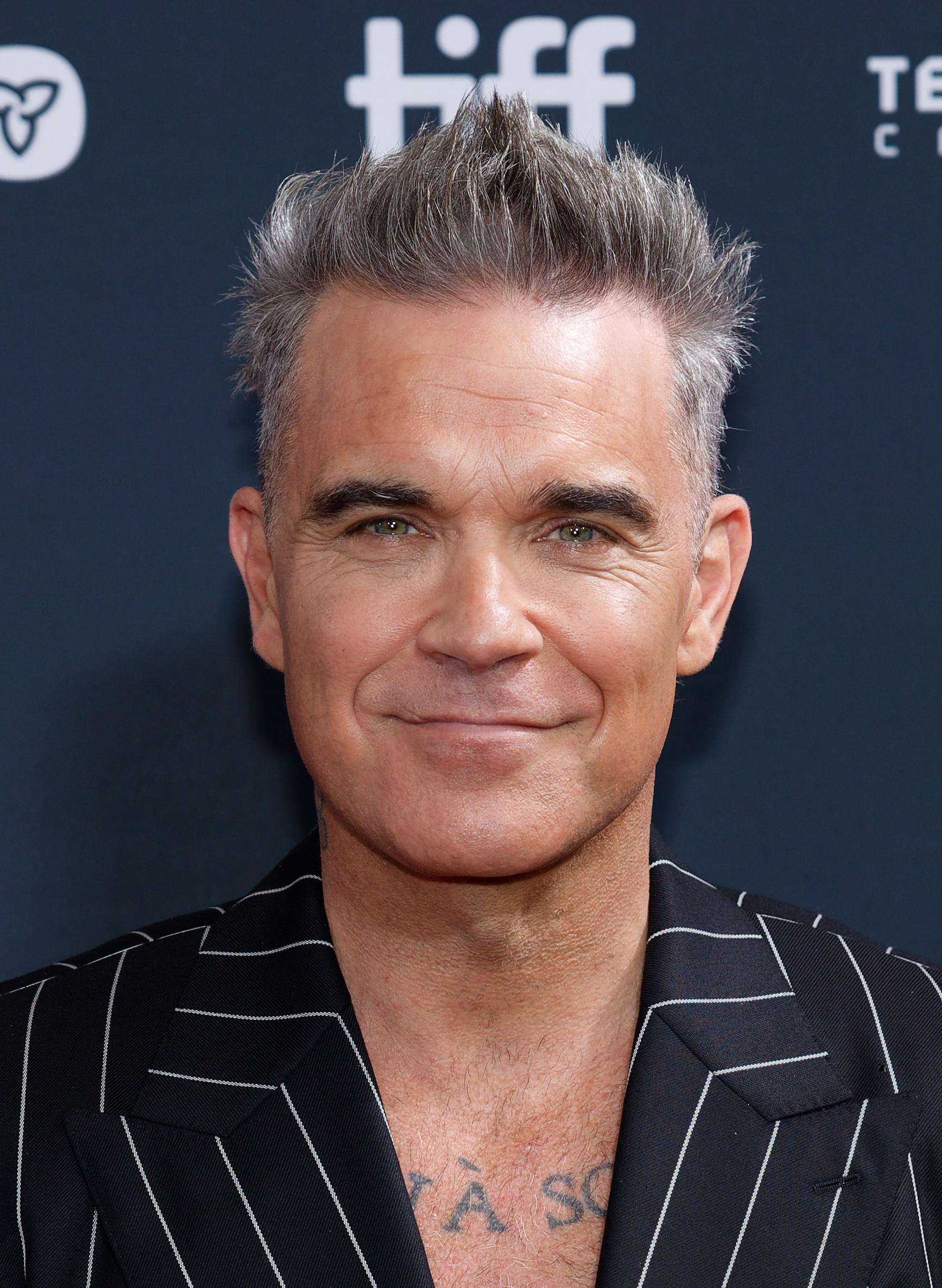
Robbie Williams is the most awarded act overall in Brits history.

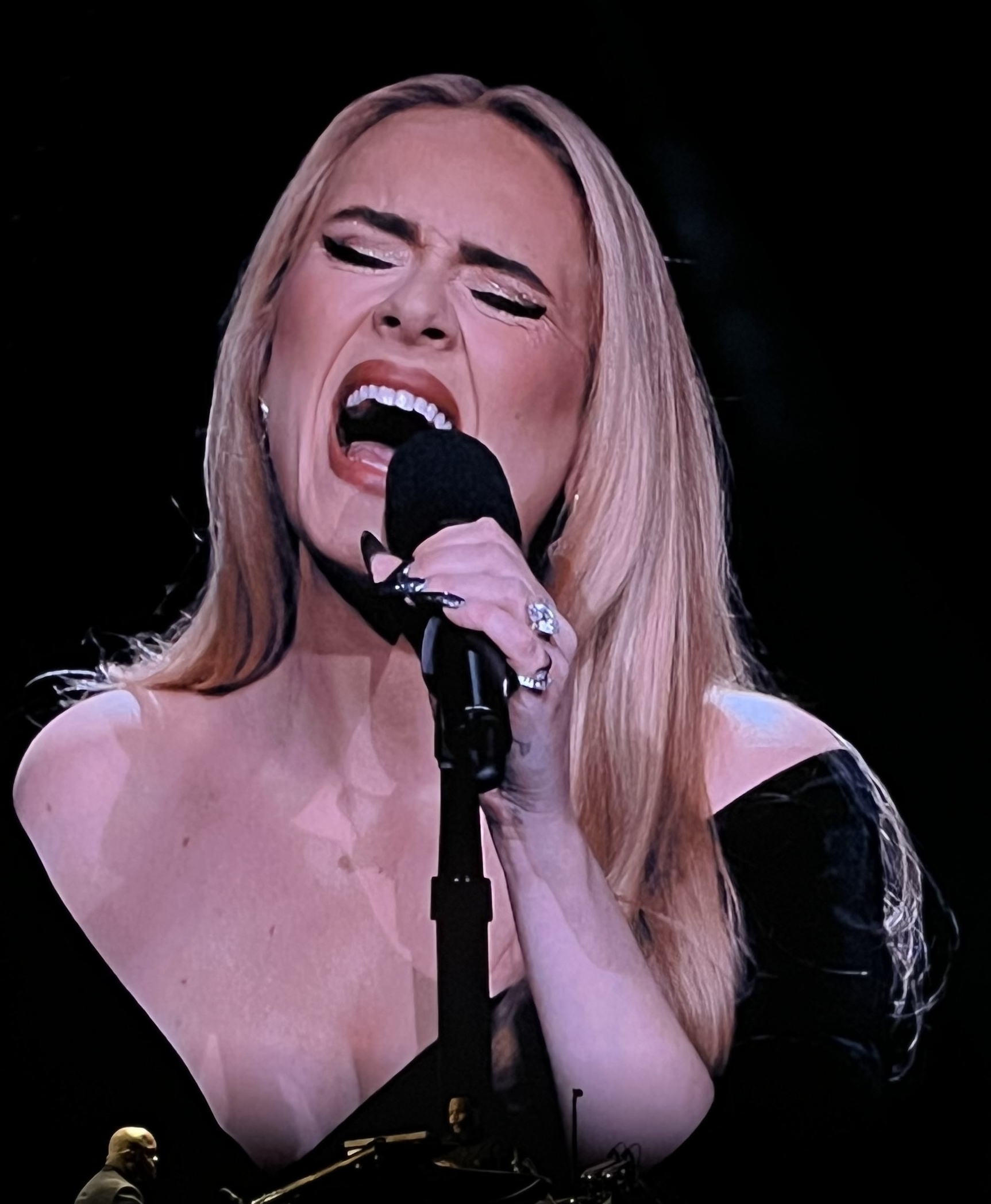
Adele is the most awarded female act in Brits history.

There have been numerous acts, both groups and individuals, that have won multiple awards. The table below shows those that have won four or more awards.

Number of awards	British acts	Notes
13	Robbie Williams	British Male Solo Artist (4); British Single of the Year (3); British Video of the Year (3); British Song of Twenty Five Year (1); Icon Award (1); Outstanding Contribution to Music (1)
12	Adele	British Album of the Year (3); British Song Of The Year (3); British Female Solo Artist (2); Global Success Award (2); British Artist Of The Year (1); Critics' Choice Award (1)
9	Coldplay	British Group (4); British Album of the Year (3); British Live Act (1); British Single of the Year (1)
8	Take That	British Single of the Year (5); British Group (1); British Live Act (1); British Video of the Year (1)
7	Arctic Monkeys	British Album of the Year (3); British Group (3); British Breakthrough Act (1)
7	Annie Lennox	British Female Solo Artist (6); British Album of the Year (1)
7	One Direction	British Video of the Year (4); Global Success Award (2); British Single of the Year (1)
7	Dua Lipa	British Female Solo Artist (2); British Album of the Year (1); British Breakthrough Act (1); British Single of the Year (1); British Pop/R&B Act (1); British Pop Act (1)
7	Oasis	British Album of the Year (1); British Breakthrough Act (1); British Group (1); British Video of the Year (1); Best Album of the last 30 Years (1); Outstanding Contribution to Music (1); Songwriter of the Year (1)
7	Ed Sheeran	British Male Solo Artist (2); Global Success Award (2); British Album of the Year (1); British Breakthrough Act (1); Songwriter of the Year (1)
7	Raye	British Album of the Year (1); British Artist of the Year (1); British Song of the Year (1); Best New Artist (1); British R&B Act (2); Songwriter of the Year (1)
6	David Bowie	British Male Solo Artist (3); British Album of the Year (1); Icon Award (1); Outstanding Contribution to Music (1)
6	Phil Collins	British Male Solo Artist (3); British Album of the Year (1); British Single of the Year (1); Soundtrack/Cast Recording (1)
6	Harry Styles	British Album of the Year (1); British Artist of the Year (1); British Single of the Year (2); British Video of the Year (1); British Pop/R&B Act (1)
5	Blur	British Album of the Year (1); British Group (1); British Single of the Year (1); British Video of the Year (1); Outstanding Contribution to Music (1)
5	Charli XCX	Best Dance Act (1); British Album of the Year (1); British Artist of the Year (1); Song of the Year (1); Songwriter of the Year (1)
5	Elton John	Outstanding Contribution to Music (2); British Male Solo Artist (1); Freddie Mercury Award (1); Icon Award (1)
5	Spice Girls	British Single of the Year (1); British Video of the Year (1); Highest Selling Album Act (1); Live Performance of Thirty Year (1); Outstanding Contribution to Music (1)
5	Sam Fender	British Single of the Year (1); British Alternative/Rock Act (3); Critics' Choice Award (1)
4	The Beatles	Outstanding Contribution to Music (2); British Album of the Year (1); British Group (1)
4	Dido	British Female Solo Artist (2); British Album of the Year (1); British Single of the Year (1)
4	Manic Street Preachers	British Album of the Year (2); British Group (2)
4	Emeli Sandé	British Female Solo Artist (2); British Album of the Year (1); Critics' Choice Award (1)
4	Paul Weller	British Male Solo Artist (3); Outstanding Contribution to Music (1)
4	The 1975	British Album of the Year (1); British Group (2); British Rock/Alternative Act (1)
4	Olivia Dean	British Album of the Year (1); British Song of the Year (1); British Artist of the Year (1); British Pop Act (1)

=== Most nominations by British acts ===
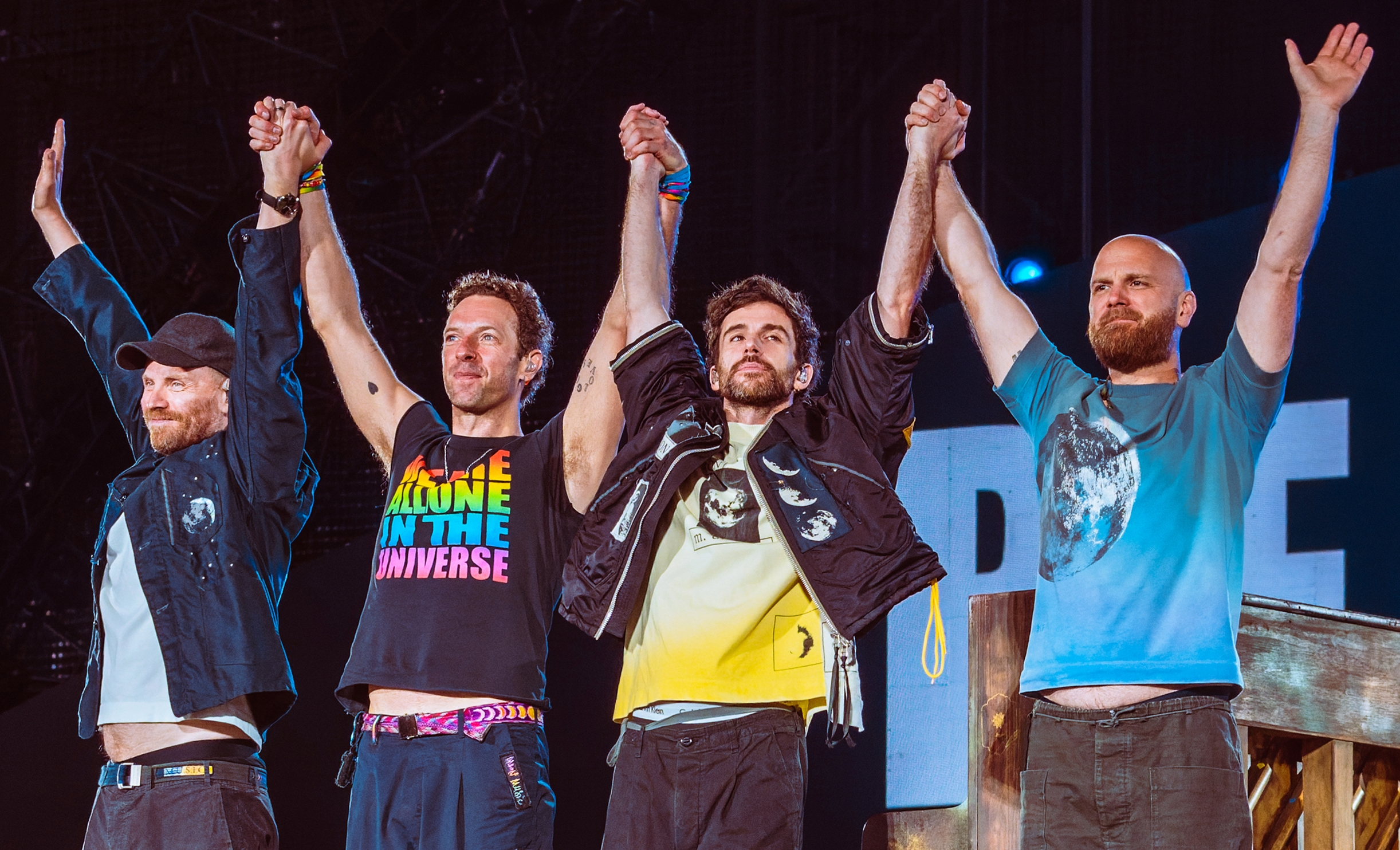
Coldplay are the most nominated act in Brits history.

Number of nominations	British acts	Notes
32	Coldplay	British Group (10); British Album of the Year (6); British Single of the Year (6); British Live Act (3); British Video of the Year (3); British Alternative/Rock Act (1); British Breakthrough Act (1); British Album – Last 30 Years (1); British Live Performance – Last 30 Years (1)
24	Ed Sheeran	British Single of the Year (8); British Album of the Year (4); British Male Solo Artist (3); British Video of the Year (3); Global Success Award (2); British Artist of the Year (1); British Pop/R&B Act (1); Best International Song (1); British Breakthrough Act (1)
23	Dua Lipa	British Single of the Year (7); British Album of the Year (3); British Video of the Year (3); British Artist of the Year (2); Best Pop Act (2); Best Pop/R&B Act (2); British Female Solo Artist (2); British Breakthrough Act (1); Critics' Choice (1)
20	Blur	British Group (5); British Single of the Year (5); British Album of the Year (4); British Video of the Year (4); British Rock/Alternative Act (1); Outstanding Contribution to Music (1)
19	Adele	British Single of the Year (5); British Album of the Year (3); British Female Solo Artist (3); British Video of the Year (2); Global Success Award (2); Artist of the Year (1); British Pop/R&B Act (1); British Breakthrough Act (1); Critics' Choice (1)
18	Take That	British Single of the Year (7); British Group (4); British Album of the Year (2); British Video of the Year (2); British Live Act (1); British Breakthrough Act (1); British Live Performance – Last 30 Years (1)
16	Radiohead	British Group (7); British Album of the Year (4); British Single of the Year (2); British Video of the Year (2); British Producer of the Year (1)
12	One Direction	British Group (4); British Video of the Year (4); British Single of the Year (2); Global Success Award (2)

=== Most wins by international acts ===
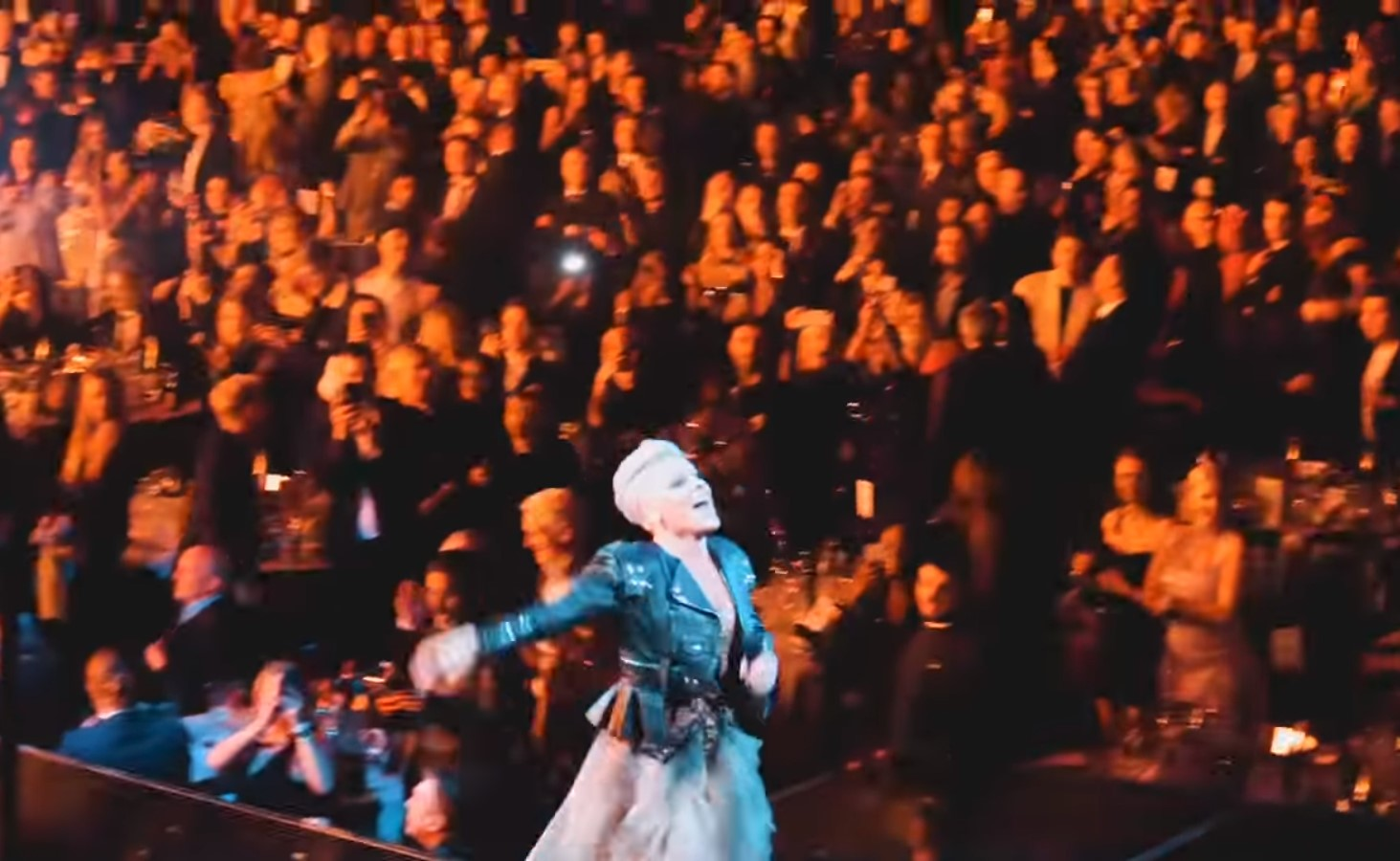
Pink performing at the 2019 Brit Awards where she received the Icon award. She also received the award for International Female Solo Artist in 2003.

Number of awards	International acts	Notes
7	U2	International Group (5); Most Successful Live Act (1); Outstanding Contribution to Music (1)
7	Prince	International Male Solo Artist (2); International Solo Artist (2); International Artist (1); Soundtrack/Cast Recording (2)
7	Michael Jackson	International Solo Artist (3); Artist of a Generation (1); British Album of the Year (1); British Video of the Year (1); International Male Solo Artist (1)
6	Beyoncé	International Female Solo Artist (2); International Artist of the Year (1); International Song of the Year (1); International Group of the Year (2)
5	Björk	International Female Solo Artist (4); International Breakthrough Act (1)
5	Foo Fighters	International Group (4); International Album (1)
4	Kylie Minogue	International Female Solo Artist (2); International Album (1); Global Icon Award (1)
4	Eminem	International Male Solo Artist (3); International Album (1)
3	Beck	International Male Solo Artist (3)
3	Billie Eilish	International Female Solo Artist (2); International Artist of the Year (1)
3	Lady Gaga	International Album (1); International Breakthrough Act (1); International Female Solo Artist (1)
3	Bruno Mars	International Male Solo Artist (2); British Single of the Year (1)
3	R.E.M.	International Group (3)
3	Scissor Sisters	International Album (1); International Breakthrough Act (1); International Group (1)
3	Justin Timberlake	International Male Solo Artist (2); International Album (1)
3	Kanye West	International Male Solo Artist (3)

=== Most nominations by international acts ===
Number of nominations	International acts	Notes
15	Kylie Minogue	Best International Female (5); International Female Solo Artist (3); Best International Album (2); International Artist (1); Global Icon (1); Best Pop Act (1); Best British Video (1); Brits Performance of 30 Years (1)

== Viewing figures ==
Year	Air date	Official ratings (in millions) (Includes HD)	Weekly rank
1999	17 February	9.86	12
2000	4 March	9.61	12
2001	27 February	8.62	18
2002	21 February	7.83	15
2003	20 February	7.64	15
2004	17 February	6.18	18
2005	10 February	6.32	17
2006	16 February	4.70	22
2007	14 February	5.43	19
2008	20 February	6.35	17
2009	18 February	5.49	17
2010	16 February	6.52	14
2011	15 February	4.79	18
2012	21 February	6.63	17
2013	20 February	5.91	14
2014	19 February	3.84	18
2015	25 February	5.99	13
2016	24 February	6.22	13
2017	22 February	5.57	14
2018	21 February	4.94	17
2019	20 February	4.82	28
2020	18 February	4.42	35
2021	11 May	3.27	50
2022	8 February	2.70	—N/a
2023	11 February	3.79	26
2024	2 March	2.92	40
2025	1 March	2.50	—N/a

== See also ==
- Classic BRIT Awards
