= Thumbprint Editions =

Printmaking studio in London, England

Coordinates: 51.4734°N 0.0978°W

Thumbprint Editions is a printmaking studio in London. The studio makes etchings and woodcuts with artists including Damien Hirst, Anish Kapoor, Michael Craig-Martin, Antony Gormley, Gillian Ayres, Cornelia Parker, Yinka Shonibare CBE and Gary Hume.

The studios are located in an industrial building in South London and are equipped with three Rochat etching presses, one relief press and a purpose-built Dutch press, capable of printing etchings and relief prints up to 1.2m by 2.5m. A Spektraproof platemaking frame and a large printdown-frame and lamp can make photo-etchings and polymer Gravures.

Thumbprint Editions have produced prints published by Alan Cristea Gallery, Art on the Underground, Bronze Orchid, Capital Prints, Grimm Fine Art, Grosvenor Vadhera Gallery, Harvey Bayer Fine Art, Hollybush Gardens, ICA, Other Criteria, Paragon Press, Parasol Unit Foundation for Contemporary Art, Thumbprint publications, White Cube, Whitechapel Art Gallery, and World House Editions.
