= Britannia Music Club =

Defunct British mail-order company

Britannia Music Club (1969–2007) was a British mail-order company owned by PolyGram which sponsored the Brit Awards. The company was acquired by Universal Pictures as part of PolyGram in 1998, and closed in 2007.

The direct marketing format was to offer an unbeatable discounted offer from PolyGram's catalogue, such as an offer of four albums for £1 each - or Solti's recording of Wagner's Ring for the Britannia Classical Club - which then required the member to buy six CDs in the first year and three in the second year at full price. Together with bonus offers. The company also engaged in on-line sales from 1998 to 2007.

The club is mentioned in the song "Uffington Wassail" on the 2000 album Trouble over Bridgwater by Half Man Half Biscuit.
