= Laird School of Art =

Former art school in Birkenhead, England

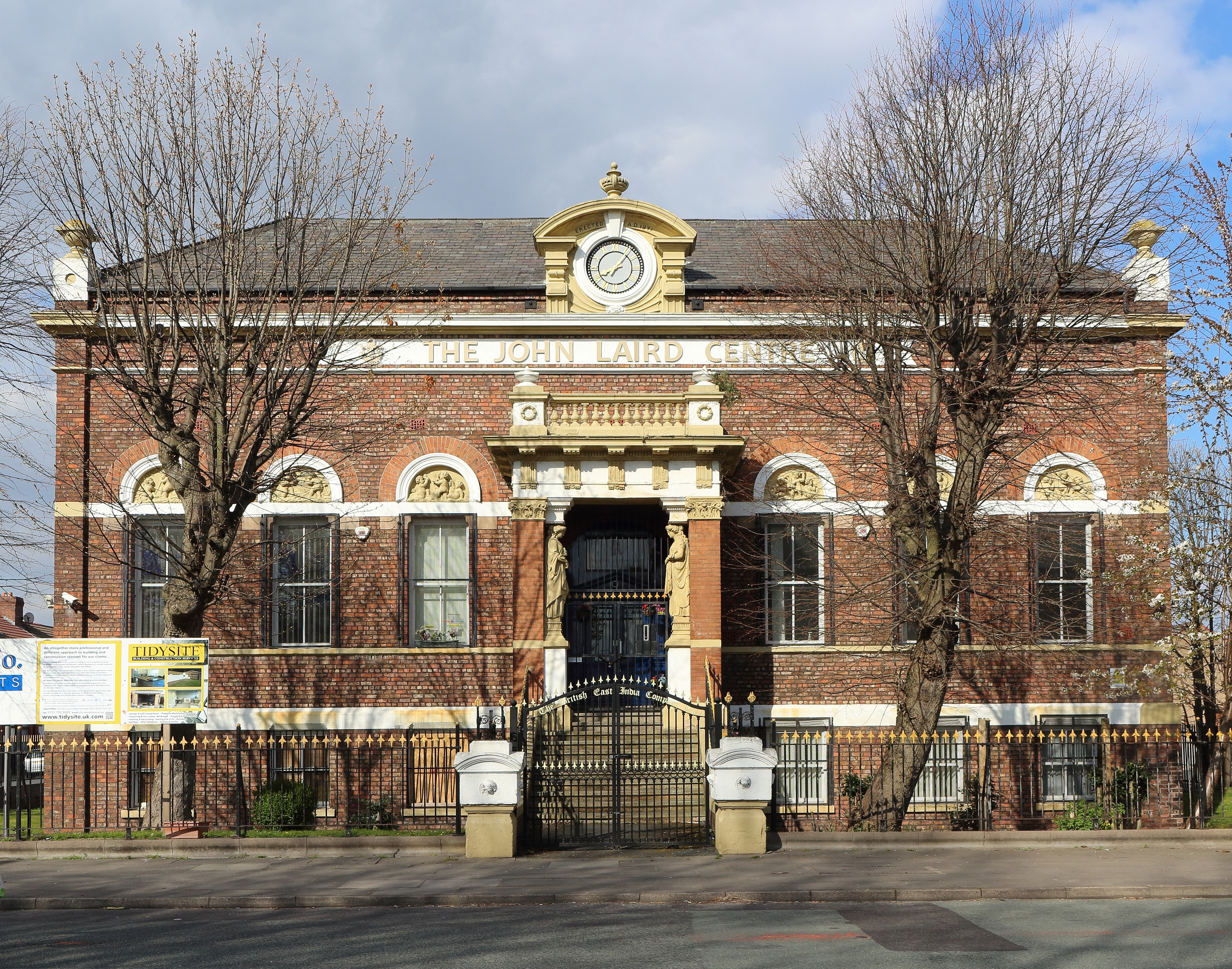
- The Laird School of Art is now the John Laird Centre

Location
- 4, Park Road North; Birkenhead, Wirral; England; 53.39473°N 3.033407°W

Information
- Type: Further Education; Art School
- Established: 1871
- Founder: John Laird
- Closed: 1979

The Laird School of Art was a school of art situated on Park Road North, Birkenhead, Merseyside, England, overlooking Birkenhead Park. It was the first public school of art outside London and was given to the town by John Laird. The school opened on 27 September 1871 and was closed in 1980 when it merged with the Birkenhead College of Technology, formerly situated on Borough Road. The building on Park Road North is used as the John Laird Centre.

== Notable alumni ==
- Trena Cox, stained glass artist.
- Martin Cooper of the band Orchestral Manoeuvres in the Dark.
- John Paul Kirkham, Photographer, Poet, Author, Songwriter.
- Henry Mundy, abstract painter.
