= Gillian Ayres =

British artist (1930–2018)

Gillian Ayres CBE RA
- Gillian Ayres, 1962
- Born: 3 February 1930; Barnes, London, England
- Died: 11 April 2018 (aged 88); North Devon, England
- Education: St Paul's Girls' School; Camberwell School of Art
- Known for: Painting; Printmaking
- Notable work: Antony and Cleopatra (1982)
- Spouse: Henry Mundy (m. 1951; div. 1976)
- Awards: Blackstone Prize 1988; Charles Wollaston Award, Royal Academy of Arts 1989

Gillian Ayres CBE RA (3 February 1930 – 11 April 2018) was an English painter. She is best known for abstract painting and printmaking using vibrant colours, which earned her a Turner Prize nomination.

== Early life and education ==
Gillian Ayres was born to Florence and Stephen Ayres on 3 February 1930 in Barnes, London, the youngest of three sisters. She started school when she was six. Her parents, a prosperous couple who owned a hatmaking factory, sent her to Ibstock, a progressive school in Roehampton run on Fröbel principles.

In 1941, Ayres was sent to Colet Court, the junior school for St Paul's, Hammersmith. She passed the entrance exam for St Paul's Girls' School the following year, and developed an interest in art while there. Among her schoolfriends was Shirley Williams, with whom she taught art to children in bomb-damaged parts of London.

Ayres then decided to go to art school. In 1946, she applied to the Slade School of Fine Art and was accepted. However, at sixteen, she was too young to enroll. She was advised to apply to the Camberwell School of Art and studied there from 1946 to 1950.

== Teaching ==
Gillian Ayres worked part-time at the AIA Gallery in Soho from 1951-59 before starting a teaching career. She held a number of teaching posts through the 1960s and 1970s, becoming friends with painters such as Howard Hodgkin, Robyn Denny and Roger Hilton. In 1959, she was asked to teach at Bath Academy of Art, Corsham, for six weeks. She remained on the teaching staff until 1965.

For much of her time at Corsham she shared a teaching studio with Malcolm Hughes. She was a senior lecturer at Saint Martin's School of Art, London, from 1965 to 1978 and became head of painting at Winchester School of Art in 1978, the first female teacher in the UK to hold such a position. She left teaching in 1981, and moved to an old rectory on the Llŷn Peninsula in north-west Wales to become a full-time painter.

=== Painting ===
Antony and Cleopatra, 1982

Gillian Ayres' early works are typically made with thin vinyl paint in a limited number of colours arranged in relatively simple forms, but later works in oil paint are more exuberant and very colourful, with a thick impasto being used.

One of Ayres' early projects was a 1957 commission by architect Michael Greenwood to decorate the South Hampstead High School dining hall in north London. The murals, described as "the only true British contribution to American abstract expressionism", were quickly covered over with wallpaper before being rediscovered in 1983 in nearly perfect condition.

The titles of her paintings, such as Anthony and Cleopatra (1982), A Midsummer Night (1990) and Gyre and Gimble (2013), were usually given after the painting is completed and do not directly describe the content of the painting, but rather are intended to resonate with the general mood of the work.

=== Printmaking ===
Ayres was a dedicated printmaker, making prints with Jack Shirreff in Wiltshire, and in her later life with Peter Kosowicz at Thumbprint Editions, London. Ayres made her first print project, a group of three etchings, with the Alan Cristea Gallery in 1998. The Alan Cristea Gallery went on to present her works in seven solo exhibitions at the gallery, and numerous group exhibitions, and at art fairs around the world. Several of her solo exhibitions toured to institutes in the UK, and the gallery worked in partnership with institutions and museums, including Jerwood Gallery, Hastings (2010), the National Museum Cardiff, Wales (2017) and CAFA Art Museum, Beijing (2017) to bring Ayres’ work to wider audiences through major exhibitions of her paintings, drawings and prints.

=== Solo exhibitions and collections ===
Ayres had a number of solo exhibitions, the first at Gallery One, London, in 1956. Since 1980 she has been featured in over 25 solo exhibitions, including the Museum of Modern Art Oxford, Oxford (1981); Serpentine Gallery, London (1983); Royal Academy of Arts, London (1997); Southampton City Art Gallery (2005); Jerwood Gallery (2010); National Museum Wales, Cardiff (2017) and CAFA Art Museum, Beijing (2017). Her art is also featured in the collections of numerous galleries, including Tate Gallery, London; Victoria and Albert Museum, London; Whitworth Art Gallery, Manchester; Swindon Museum and Art Gallery; Museum of Fine Arts, Boston; Yale Center for British Art, New Haven and the Museum of Modern Art, New York.

In 2023 her work was included in the exhibition Action, Gesture, Paint: Women Artists and Global Abstraction 1940-1970 at the Whitechapel Gallery in London.

=== Awards ===
Ayres was awarded the Japan International Art Promotion Association Award in 1963, and in 1975 she was awarded a bursary by the Arts Council of Great Britain. In 1982 she was named runner up for the John Moores Painting Prize and shortlisted for the Turner Prize in 1989.

She was appointed Officer of the Order of the British Empire (OBE) in 1986, and in 1991 became a Royal Academician. She later temporarily resigned from the Academy, following the broadcast of a BBC Omnibus television documentary about the preparations for the controversial Sensation exhibition hosted by the Academy in 1997 show-casing the Young British Artists. The documentary, according to Ayres, presented an unfair view of the older members of the Academy. She objected to the inclusion of Marcus Harvey's portrait of serial killer Myra Hindley in the exhibition.

She was appointed Commander of the Order of the British Empire (CBE) in the 2011 Birthday Honours.

=== Momart fire (2004) ===
On 24 May 2004, 14 of Ayres' pieces were destroyed in a fire at a warehouse of the art-storage company Momart in the Cromwell industrial estate in Leyton, east London.

== Personal life ==
Ayres married the painter Henry Mundy in 1951. They divorced in 1976, but continued to live together. They had two sons. The couple lived with their younger son, also a painter.

In 1987, Ayres moved from Wales to a 15th-century cottage at Morwenstow, on the Devon–Cornwall border. In the late 1970s, Ayres suffered from pancreatitis and was comatose for four days. In 2003, she suffered a heart attack.

== Death ==
Ayres died in hospital in North Devon on 11 April 2018, aged 88. Upon her death, she was described as "immensely courageous, independent and determined in both her art and her lifestyle" by the Alan Cristea Gallery, who represented her for twenty years. Her work was shown posthumously, alongside that of Rachel Jones and Nao Matsunaga in 2019 at the New Art Centre, Salisbury, Wiltshire.
