= Henry Mundy (abstract painter) =

British artist (1919–2019)

- Born: 13 January 1919; Birkenhead, Wirral, Cheshire, England
- Died: 27 February 2019 (aged 100); Bude, Cornwall, England
- Education: St Francis Xavier School, Birkenhead; Laird School of Art (1933–37); Camberwell School of Art (1946–50) taught by Victor Pasmore, Sir William Coldstream, Sir Lawrence Gowing and Michael Rothenstein, and studied illustration under John Minton and Edward Ardizzone
- Known for: Painting
- Notable work: Cluster (1961)
- Movement: Abstract art
- Spouse: Gillian Ayres (m. 1951; div. 1976)
- Children: 2
- Awards: John Moores Painting Prize (1961)
- Website: Henry Mundy – Art UK

Henry Mundy (13 January 1919 – 27 February 2019) was an English abstract painter and teacher.

Born in Birkenhead, Cheshire Mundy was one of ten children and attended St Francis Xavier School and Laird School of Art (1933–37). Moving to London to study at Camberwell School of Arts and Crafts (1946–50) alongside Anthony Eyton, Terry Frost, Andrew Forge and Gillian Ayres whom he would marry in 1951.

Taught at Saint Martin's School of Art (1966–82) and Bath School of Art and Design (1959–66).

== Work ==
Art critic David Sylvester commented that Mundy's works 'relate to visual experience, to seeing in a space which is all around one, to seeing as one moves about in space'.

== Selected exhibitions ==
=== Solo ===
- Gallery One, London (1954)
- Henry Mundy: Drawings, Institute of Contemporary Arts, London (1958)

=== Group ===
- Place, ICA (1959)
- Situation, RBA Galleries (1960)
- New Situation, New London Gallery (1961)

== Awards ==
- John Moores Painting Prize (1961)

== Collections ==
- British Council
- Brooklyn Museum
- San Francisco Museum of Modern Art
- Tate
