= Rachel Jones (artist) =

British visual artist (born 1991)

- Born: 1991 (age 33–34); Whitechapel, East London, England
- Education: Glasgow School of Art; Royal Academy Schools
- Occupation: Visual artist
- Website: rachelvictoriajones.co.uk

Rachel Jones (born 1991) is a British visual artist. She has exhibited work in the UK at galleries and institutions including Thaddaeus Ropac, The Sunday Painter and the Royal Scottish Academy, and has been artist-in-residence at the Chinati Foundation (2019) and Masterworks Museum of Bermuda Art in (2016). Her work is in collections of The Tate, Arts Council England, Hepworth Wakefield, the Museum of Fine Arts, Houston, and the Institute of Contemporary Art, Miami.

== Biography ==
Rachel Jones was born in Whitechapel, East London, to a Jamaican mother and a Barbadian father and grew up in Brentwood, Essex. She studied at Glasgow School of Art, earning a BA Fine Art degree in 2013, and subsequently an MA in Fine Art from the Royal Academy Schools (2019). In a 2021 interview for Harper's Bazaar, Jones was quoted as saying of her time at art school: "I learned a lot about how to interrogate my own thoughts and feelings through my practice, in a way that I hadn't before ... I was trying to centre my experience as a Black woman in a space that is predominantly white and, ultimately, not designed for me to thrive."

Her work has been described by art critic Louisa Buck as patrolling "a porous line between abstraction and the figurative ... rooted in the sheer joy of abstract colour, form and gesture", and Jones explains: "The things that I was most drawn to and moved by as a younger artist, and even as a child, often tended to be by Abstract Expressionist painters. I also responded to things that were abstract in the sense that they were removed from a reality that was day-to-day ... you can use colour and shape and form to speak to people in a way that isn't about a spoken language—it's about emotion and inciting feelings that don't have to be explained or expressed. It's responsive, it's instinctive, and a core part of all of us. So for me, it came from a place of being intrigued by these things and understanding them as a base human desire, and wanting to figure out how I could fit within that history and explore my interest in representations of Blackness."

Works by Jones are held in collections of The Tate, Arts Council England, the Hepworth Wakefield, the Museum of Fine Arts, Houston, and the Institute of Contemporary Art, Miami, and she was a participant in the major 2021 exhibition Mixing it Up: Painting Today at the Hayward Gallery in London's Southbank Centre, where she was one of the youngest artists in the show. As one review noted: "At Hayward Gallery's group exhibition Mixing it Up: Painting Today—a who's who of Britain's emerging painters—you'd have done well not to be stopped in your tracks by the vibrant, sprawling paintings of Rachel Jones. Her monumental, unstretched canvases comprise layered passages of competing oil stick and oil paint, with a tendency towards bold crimson backgrounds, their surfaces overlaid with scumbled gestural patterns in bright colours ... she has fast become one of Britain's top younger painters."

At the end of 2021, her well-received first solo show opened at the Thaddaeus Ropac gallery in London, prompting the Evening Standard to comment: "The 30-year-old Essex-based artist also has a Chisenhale Gallery show coming around the corner and, ahead of that, this exhibition, SMIIILLLLEEEE, in one of Europe’s biggest commercial galleries. And no wonder there's so much excitement about her: Jones is already a distinctive voice, creating ravishingly colourful works with intriguing subject matter ... this is hugely impressive stuff." Caroline Douglas of Contemporary Art Society said: "For her latest London exhibition, Rachel Jones brings not just paintings but words and music references to scaffold her work in the here and now ... The sensual, as well as the symbolic, power of the mouth and teeth have become the way the artist uses to speak about her ethnicity, and her experience of being a Black woman in the world today." To close what The Art Newspaper characterised as "one of the most acclaimed new painting shows in recent years", responses were invited from "literary luminaries" – publisher and editor Margaret Busby, Sepake Angiama (Iniva artistic director), Yates Norton (curator at the Roberts Institute of Art), writer, artist and educator Imani Mason Jordan, and poet Vanessa Onwuemezi – who provided "aural complement to the images shimmering on the walls."

Jones's exhibition at the Chisenhale Gallery, say cheeeeese, ran from 12 March to 12 June 2022. Aurella Yussuf's review in Artsy states: "If the primary function of Jones’s work is to express the vast spectrum of her emotions, teeth became, for the artist, evocative of so many elements of human existence, such as consumption, laughter, even violence. The mouth is both a figurative and literal opening, an entryway into the physical body—its essential functions and all the unpleasantness that it entails—as well as an avenue for speech and expression. Although not working directly from reference images, Jones's practice is informed by her exposure to visual media, nature, and her lived experiences ... the underlying principle is that everyone has a mouth and everyone has a starting point to think about the infinite possibilities that lie within."

Jones designed the Britannia trophy statuettes for the 2024 Brit Awards, (a commission that has previously been given to artists and designers such as David Adjaye, Tracey Emin, Zaha Hadid, Damien Hirst, Anish Kapoor, and Vivienne Westwood).

== Exhibitions ==
- 2014: RSA: New Contemporaries 2014, Royal Scottish Academy, Edinburgh
- 2017 Rachel Jones, The Black in Their Face, The Residence Gallery, London
- 2018: Rachel Jones: Mad Dogs, Jupiter Woods, London
- 2019: Red Shaped Mouths, Chinati Foundation, Marfa, Texas
- 2019: New Art Centre, Salisbury, Wiltshire, with Gillian Ayres and Nao Matsunaga
- 2020: Rachel Jones and Nicholas Pope, The Sunday Painter, London
- 2020: A Sovereign Mouth, Gallery 12.26, Dallas, Texas
- 2020: A Focus on Painting, Thaddaeus Ropac, London
- 2021: Mixing it Up: Painting Today, Hayward Gallery, London
- 2021: SMIIILLLLEEEE, Thaddaeus Ropac, London
- 2022: say cheeeeese, Chisenhale Gallery, London
- 2023: Rachel Jones a shorn root, Long Museum, Shanghai
- 2024: Rachel Jones: !!!!!, MoAD, Museum of the African Diaspora, San Francisco
- 2025: Rachel Jones: Dark-Pivot, Regen Projects, Los Angeles
- 2025: Rachel Jones: Gated Canyons, Dulwich Picture Gallery, London
- 2025: Rachel Jones: Courtauld Gallery 2025 Commission, The Courtauld Gallery, London
