= The Very Best of Dina Carroll =

The Very Best of

Compilation album by Dina Carroll
- Released: 2001
- Genres: Pop; dance; house; ballad; smooth jazz; soul; R&B
- Label: Mercury
- Producers: Nigel Lowis; Robert Clivillés; David Cole; Peter Collins; Laurence Nelson; Alastair Johnson; Rhett Lawrence; David Morales

Dina Carroll chronology
| Only Human (1996) | The Very Best of (2001) | The Collection (2004) |

Professional ratings
Review scores
| Source | Rating |
|---|---|
| AllMusic | 3.5/5 stars |
| Encyclopedia of Popular Music | 3/5 stars |

The Very Best of is a compilation album by British soul–dance singer Dina Carroll, released in 2001 on the Mercury label. The majority of the tracks on the compilation were released as singles that are taken from Carroll's two studio albums, So Close (1993) and Only Human (1996). Also included are tracks from Carroll's unreleased 1998 self-titled album, and a track from the soundtrack to the film Bridget Jones's Diary (2001).

The album reached number 15 on the UK Albums Chart in June 2001 achieving Gold status.

== Track listing ==
| No. | Title | Writer(s) | Origin | Length |
|---|---|---|---|---|
| 1. | "Ain't No Man" | Dina Carroll; Nigel Lowis | So Close, 1993 | 3:53 |
| 2. | "Special Kind of Love" | David Cole; Robert Clivillés | So Close | 4:41 |
| 3. | "Someone Like You" | Van Morrison | Bridget Jones's Diary soundtrack, 2001 | 3:29 |
| 4. | "Escaping" (Radio Edit) | Barry Blue; Robyn Smith; Carroll; Lowis | Only Human, 1996 | 3:42 |
| 5. | "The Perfect Year" | Andrew Lloyd Webber; Don Black; Christopher Hampton | non-album single, 1993; later released on Only Human | 3:45 |
| 6. | "It's Too Late" (Quartz introducing Dina Carroll) | Carole King; Toni Stern | Perfect Timing (Quartz album), 1991 | 3:29 |
| 7. | "Express" | Carroll; Lowis | So Close | 3:42 |
| 8. | "Don't Be a Stranger" (Radio Mix) | Coral Gordon; Geoff Gurd | So Close | 4:48 |
| 9. | "Without Love" (Dave Sears Radio Edit) | Berny Cosgrove; Kevin Clark | non-album single (1999) | 3:34 |
| 10. | "Good to Me" (Radio Edit) | Rhett Lawrence; Carroll | unreleased self-titled third album, 1998 | 3:51 |
| 11. | "This Time" (Radio Mix) | Carroll; Lowis | So Close | 3:44 |
| 12. | "Only Human" (Edit) | Vikki Wells; Mike S. Riley | Only Human | 3:45 |
| 13. | "Mind, Body & Soul" | Carroll; Lowis | Only Human | 4:31 |
| 14. | "Son of a Preacher Man" | John Hurley; Ronnie Wilkins | unreleased self-titled third album | 2:48 |
| 15. | "One, Two, Three" (Radio Version) | Steve Robson; Pete Kearney | unreleased self-titled third album | 4:31 |
| 16. | "All I Ask" | Desmond Child; Ronan Keating | previously unreleased, 2001 | 3:45 |
| 17. | "Livin' for the Weekend" | Carroll; Lowis; David Morales | Only Human | 3:45 |
| 18. | "So Close" (Radio Mix) | Carroll; Lowis | So Close | 3:50 |

== Personnel ==
Adapted from the album's liner notes.

- Tracks 1, 4, 5, 7, 8, 11, 12, 13 & 18 produced by Nigel Lowis
- Track 2 produced by Robert Clivillés & David Cole
- Tracks 3 & 16 produced by Peter Collins
- Track 9 produced by Laurence Nelson & Alastair Johnson
- Tracks 10, 14 & 15 produced by Rhett Lawrence
- Track 17 produced by Nigel Lowis & David Morales; additional production by Laurence Nelson, Alastair Johnson & Nick Carter
- Art direction by Tom Bird
- Photography on outer packaging & cover by Tony Duran
- Photography on internal pages by Tony Duran, Simon Fowler, Julian Broad & Zanna
- Design by Paul Chessell
