= The Perfect Year =

1993 single by Dina Carroll

Single by Dina Carroll
- B-side: "Here"
- Released: 29 November 1993
- Length: 3:45
- Label: A&M; 1st Avenue
- Songwriters: Andrew Lloyd Webber; Don Black; Christopher Hampton
- Producer: Nigel Lowis

Dina Carroll singles chronology
"Don't Be a Stranger" (1993)	"The Perfect Year" (1993)	"Escaping" (1996)

Music video
- "The Perfect Year" on YouTube

"The Perfect Year" is a song performed by English singer-songwriter Dina Carroll, with music by Andrew Lloyd Webber and lyrics by Don Black and Christopher Hampton. It is taken from the 1993 musical Sunset Boulevard, produced by Nigel Lowis, and was released as a single on 29 November 1993 by A&M and 1st Avenue. Later, it was included on Carroll's second album, Only Human (1996). Becoming one of her most successful songs, it peaked at number five in the United Kingdom and number four in Ireland. On the Eurochart Hot 100, it reached number 17 in January 1994. In 2001, the song was included on Carroll's first compilation album, The Very Best of Dina Carroll.

== Critical reception ==
Hannsjörg Riemann from German Bravo gave the song two out of five, stating that Carroll "can sing really well." He viewed it as a "tearjerker" that "doesn't tear me off my stool despite the noble design." In his weekly UK chart commentary, James Masterton described the song as a "Christmassy ballad". Alan Jones from Music Week gave it a full score of five out of five and named it Pick of the Week, writing, "This heartwarming ballad from Sunset Boulevard with sweeping strings, a powerful vocal and optimistic, seasonal lyrics could easily end Carroll's perfect year by becoming her first number one single." James Hamilton from the Record Mirror Dance Update complimented it as a "gorgeous Lloyd Webber radio ballad". German band Culture Beat reviewed it for Smash Hits, giving it four out of five. Jay Supreme said, "This is a real sweet song though and a great song if the mood is right." Tania Evans stated, "I'd say this is the best she's done so far. Dina is brilliant."

== Music video ==
A music video was produced to promote the single. It has a sepia tone and was filmed in Dublin, Ireland.

== Track listings ==
CD single, UK (1993)
No.	Title	Length
1.	"The Perfect Year" (radio mix)	3:49
2.	"Here" (West End Mix)	6:44
3.	"Here" (Nigel Lowis Mix)	7:16
4.	"Ain't No Man" (Brothers in Rhythm Remix)	7:08

7-inch and cassette single, UK (1993); mini-CD single, Japan (1994)
No.	Title	Length
1.	"The Perfect Year" (radio mix)
2.	"Here" (radio edit)

12-inch single, UK (1993)
No.	Title	Length
1.	"The Perfect Year" (radio mix)
2.	"Here" (West End Mix)
3.	"Here" (Nigel Lowis Mix)
4.	"Special Kind of Love" (Brothers in Rhythm Dub)

CD single, Europe (1993)
No.	Title	Length
1.	"The Perfect Year" (radio mix)	3:45
2.	"Here" (West End Mix)	6:43

== Charts ==
=== Weekly charts ===
Chart (1993–1994)	Peak position
Europe (Eurochart Hot 100)	17
Europe (European AC Radio)	13
Europe (European Hit Radio)	22
Ireland (IRMA)	4
Netherlands (Dutch Top 40 Tipparade)	2
Netherlands (Single Top 100)	39
UK Singles (Official Charts)	5
UK Airplay (Music Week)	7

=== Year-end charts ===
Chart (1993)	Position
UK Singles (OCC)	64

Chart (1994)	Position
UK Singles (OCC)	159

== Release history ==
Region	Date	Format(s)	Label(s)	Ref.
United Kingdom	29 November 1993	7-inch vinyl; 12-inch vinyl; CD; cassette	A&M; 1st Avenue	
Japan	26 January 1994	Mini-CD	A&M	
