= Brit Awards 1994 =

British music awards ceremony

- Date: 14 February 1994
- Venue: Alexandra Palace
- Hosted by: Elton John and RuPaul

Television/radio coverage
- Network: ITV

Brit Awards 1994 was the 14th edition of the Brit Awards, an annual pop music awards ceremony in the United Kingdom. It was organised by the British Phonographic Industry and took place on 14 February 1994 at Alexandra Palace in London. It was the first year that the British Dance Act award was given.

== Performances ==
- Björk and PJ Harvey – "(I Can't Get No) Satisfaction"
- Bon Jovi featuring Brian May and Dina Carroll – "I'll Sleep When I'm Dead"
- Elton John and RuPaul – "Don't Go Breaking My Heart"
- Meat Loaf – "I'd Do Anything for Love (But I Won't Do That)"
- Pet Shop Boys – "Go West"
- Stereo MCs – "Connected"
- Take That – "The Beatles Medley"
- Van Morrison featuring Shane MacGowan – "Have I Told You Lately"

== Winners and nominees ==
British Album of the Year	British Producer of the Year
Stereo MCs – Connected; Dina Carroll – So Close; Jamiroquai – Emergency on Planet Earth; Sting – Ten Summoner's Tales; Suede – Suede	Brian Eno; Flood; M People; Nellee Hooper; Youth
British Single of the Year	British Video of the Year
Take That – "Pray"; Dina Carroll – "Don't Be a Stranger"; Paul Weller – "Wild Wood"; Radiohead – "Creep"; Suede – "Animal Nitrate" Eliminated; Apache Indian – "Boom Shack-A-Lak"; Gabrielle – "Dreams"; M People – "Moving On Up"; New Order – "Regret"; Shaggy – "Oh Carolina"	Take That – "Pray"; David Bowie – "Jump They Say"; Depeche Mode – "I Feel You"; Pet Shop Boys – "Go West"; Sting – "Fields of Gold" Eliminated; Gabrielle – "Dreams"; Jamiroquai – "Too Young to Die"; New Order – "Regret"; Peter Gabriel – "Steam"; Suede – "Animal Nitrate"
British Male Solo Artist	British Female Solo Artist
Sting; Apache Indian; Paul Weller; Rod Stewart; Van Morrison	Dina Carroll; Beverley Craven; Gabrielle; PJ Harvey; Shara Nelson
British Group	British Breakthrough Act
Stereo MCs; Jamiroquai; M People; Suede; Take That	Gabrielle; Apache Indian; Jamiroquai; Shara Nelson; Suede
British Dance Act	Soundtrack/Cast Recording
M People; Apache Indian; Jamiroquai; The Shamen; Stereo MCs	The Bodyguard; The Jungle Book; Reservoir Dogs; Sleepless in Seattle; What's Love Got to Do with It
International Male Solo Artist	International Female Solo Artist
Lenny Kravitz; Billy Joel; Meat Loaf; Neil Young; Terence Trent D'Arby	Björk; Janet Jackson; Mariah Carey; Nanci Griffith; Tina Turner
International Group	International Breakthrough Act
Crowded House; Nirvana; Pearl Jam; Spin Doctors; U2	Björk; 4 Non Blondes; Rage Against the Machine; Spin Doctors; SWV
Best Selling Album & Single Act	Outstanding Contribution to Music
Meat Loaf	Van Morrison
