= Clubland =

Clubland may refer to:

- St James's, an area of Westminster in London where many gentlemen's clubs are located
- Clubland (1991 film), a 1991 British television film by Nick Perry in the anthology series ScreenPlay
- Clubland (1999 film), an American film by Mary Lambert
- Clubland (2007 film), an Australian comedy film
- Clubland (band), a 1990s house-music group
- Clubland (dance brand), a UK dance album and events brand
  - Clubland (compilation series), a series of compilation albums
  - Clubland TV, a UK music channel
- "Clubland" (song), a song by Elvis Costello
- Clubland, a defunct block of dance-related music videos that aired late nights on MTV in the United States.
