= Only Human (Dina Carroll album) =

Studio album by Dina Carroll
- Released: 14 October 1996
- Genres: Soul, R&B
- Length: 57:14
- Label: Mercury 534 096-2
- Producers: Nigel Lowis, Rich Low, David Morales, Ren Swan

Dina Carroll chronology
So Close (1993)	Only Human (1996)	The Very Best of Dina Carroll (2001)

Singles from Only Human
- 1. "Escaping" Released: 16 September 1996; 2. "Only Human" / "Run to You" Released: 9 December 1996

Professional ratings
Review scores
Source	Rating
The Encyclopedia of Popular Music	3/5 stars
Music Week	4/5 stars
Vibe	(favorable)

Only Human is the second album by British soul/dance singer Dina Carroll, released in 1996 on the Mercury label.

== Overview ==
The album includes "The Perfect Year", a track which had been a top-five single in the UK singles chart in 1993, during the long chart run of Carroll's debut album So Close, on which it had not been included. "Escaping" reached No. 3 in the UK, Carroll's joint highest-charting single (along with "Don't Be a Stranger"). The follow-up double A-sided single "Only Human/Run to You" peaked at number 33. The final single from the album "Living for the Weekend" was only issued on vinyl and promo CD's sent to radio and DJ's peaking at number 1 on the club/dance charts.

Only Human peaked at No. 2 on the UK Albums Chart, the same as its predecessor, selling over 500,000 copies and achieving platinum status.

== Reception ==
A reviewer from Music Week declared the album "a sure winner". Vikki Tobak of Vibe wrote "After establishing herself with her 1993 debut album So Close, Dina Carroll continues to display her own brand of poignant soul with an unconventional sophomore effort".

== Track listing ==
All tracks composed by Dina Carroll and Nigel Lowis unless stated.

1. "Escaping" (Margaret Urlich, Nigel Lowis, B. Blue, R. Smith) 4:45
2. "Only Human" (V. Wells, M. Riley) 5:15
3. "Give Me the Right" 5:24
4. "World Come Between Us" 3:44
5. "Love Will Always Bring You Back to Me" 4:17
6. "I Didn't Mean to Hurt You" (B. Thiele, M. Roy) 6:24
7. "Living for the Weekend" (Dina Carroll, Nigel Lowis, David Morales) 3:30
8. "Mind Body & Soul" 4:32
9. "Run to You" 5:03
10. "Do You Think I'm in Love" 4:06
11. "I Don't Want to Talk About It" (Danny Whitten) 5:28
12. "The Perfect Year" (Andrew Lloyd Webber, Don Black, Christopher Hampton) 3:46

== Singles ==
1993 – "The Perfect Year" (UK #5)
1996 – "Escaping" (UK #3)
1996 – "Only Human" / "Run to You" (UK #33)

== Credits ==
Arranged By [Horns] – Nick Ingman (tracks: 3 4 6)
Arranged By [Strings] – Nick Ingman (tracks: 2 3 4 5 6 12)
Artwork By – Area
Backing Vocals – Dina Carroll (tracks: 2, 3, 6 to 10, 12), Ivor Reid (tracks: 6 8), Lance Ellington (tracks: 1 4 5), Marc Reid (tracks: 6 8), Miriam Stockley (tracks: 1 4 5)
Conductor [Horns] – Nick Ingman (tracks: 3 6)
Conductor [Strings] – Nick Ingman (tracks: 2 3 5 6 12)
Engineer – Ren Swan (tracks: 3 6 8 11 12), Rich Lowe (tracks: 1, 2 to 5, 7 to 10)
Engineer [Assistant] – Andrew Godwin (tracks: 1 to 5, 7 to 10), Tim Wills (tracks: 1, 3 to 8, 10 to 12)
Guitar – Hugh Burns (tracks: 1 5), Nigel Lowis (tracks: 3 4 9 10)
Keyboards – Graham Plato (tracks: 3 9 10), Nigel Lowis (tracks: 1 2 4 5 7 8)
Leader [Strings] – Gavin Wright (tracks: 2 3 5 6 12)
Mixed By – Bob Clearmountain (tracks: 1 5), Nigel Lowis (tracks: 2 to 4, 6, 8 to 12), Ren Swan (tracks: 3 4 9 10), Rich Lowe (tracks: 8 12)
Photography – Simon Fowler
Piano [Grand Piano] – Peter Oxendale (tracks: 5 11 12)
Producer – Nigel Lowis
Programmed By – Graham Plato (tracks: 1 to 5, 7 to 10, 11)
Saxophone – Jimmy Gallagher (tracks: 3 6)
Strings – London Session Orchestra (tracks: 2 3 5 6 12)

== Charts ==
=== Weekly charts ===
Chart (1996)	Peak position
Scottish Albums (Official Charts)	7
UK Albums (Official Charts)	2

=== Year-end charts ===
Chart (1996)	Position
UK Albums (OCC)	58
