= One, Two, Three (Dina Carroll song) =

Single by Dina Carroll
- Released: 1998
- Genre: Pop
- Length: 4:01
- Label: 1st Avenue; Mercury
- Songwriter(s): Dina Carroll; Pete Kearney; Steve Robson
- Producer(s): Rhett Lawrence

Dina Carroll singles chronology
"Livin' for the Weekend" (1996)	"One, Two, Three" (1998)	"Without Love" (1999)

Music video
- "One, Two, Three" on YouTube

"One, Two, Three" is a 1998 song by British singer Dina Carroll. It was co-written by Carroll and produced by American record producer and songwriter Rhett Lawrence. Originally it was planned to be included on Carroll's self-titled third album, but the album was ultimately shelved. The single peaked at number 16 in the UK and number 23 in Scotland. A music video was also produced to promote the single.

== Track listing ==
CD single (CD1), UK (1998)
No.	Title	Length
1.	"One, Two, Three"	4:01
2.	"Livin' for the Weekend '98" (Canny Vocal Edit)	3:45
3.	"One, Two, Three" (Full Crew Mix)	4:12

CD single (CD2), UK (1998)
No.	Title	Length
1.	"One, Two, Three"	4:02
2.	"Ain't No Man"	3:54
3.	"Escaping"	4:47

== Charts ==
Chart (1998)	Peak position
Europe (Eurochart Hot 100)	69
Scotland (OCC)	23
UK Singles (OCC)	16
