= Friends Forever (song) =

1999 single by Thunderbugs

Single by Thunderbugs

from the album Delicious
- B-side: "First Time"
- Released: 6 September 1999
- Genre: Pop rock
- Length: 3:44
- Label: Epic; 1st Avenue
- Songwriter(s): Trevor Steel; John Holliday; Thunderbugs
- Producer(s): Bump & Grind

Thunderbugs singles chronology
"Friends Forever" (1999)	"It's About Time You Were Mine" (1999)

Audio
- "Friends Forever" on YouTube

"Friends Forever" is a song by British girl group Thunderbugs, released as their debut single and as the lead single from their only studio album, Delicious. The song was written by Thunderbugs and Escape Club members Trevor Steel and John Holliday. The lyrics contain a reference to the 1990 film Thelma & Louise, and the single's cover was photographed by Tim Bret Day. It was released in the United Kingdom on 6 September 1999 and debuted at number five on the UK Singles Chart, becoming the band's highest-peaking single and only top-forty hit in the UK. The song is featured on the soundtrack to the 2000 teen drama film Center Stage.

== Critical reception ==
Rob Johnson of Into the Popvoid called "Friends Forever" a "happy, breezy affair" and went on to describe the song as a "wonderful guitar rock/pop backing track that Belinda Carlisle would have been proud of". In a review of the soundtrack album to Center Stage, William Ruhlmann said the track "sounds like it could be the anthem for the junior high school class of 2000". Several reviews have claimed that the song and its video possess the vibe of a tampon advertisement.

== Chart performance ==
Released on 6 September 1999 in the United Kingdom, "Friends Forever" debuted and peaked at number five on the UK Singles Chart on the week of 12 September 1999, spending five weeks in the top 40 and 11 weeks on the chart altogether. Its UK sales alone registered on the Eurochart Hot 100 on the issue of 25 September 1999, when it appeared at number 25. The single was given a release in Europe on 6 September 1999, but it charted only in the Flanders region of Belgium and the Netherlands. In the Netherlands, it reached number 27 on the Dutch Top 40 on 23 October 1999, while in Flanders, it peaked at number 14 on the Ultratip Bubbling Under chart on 20 November.

== Aftermath ==
Follow-up single "It's About Time You Were Mine" reached only number 43 in the United Kingdom, and the group soon disbanded. Rob Johnson of Into the Popvoid attributed the band's brief success to the decline in popularity of girl groups during the late 1990s, the release of "It's About Time You Were Mine" during the busy Christmas holiday period, and the failure of the minidisc format, on which the parent album Delicious was released.

== Track listings ==
European CD single

1. "Friends Forever" – 3:43
2. "First Time" – 2:51

European maxi-CD

1. "Friends Forever" – 3:44
2. "First Time" – 2:51
3. "Friends Forever" (K-Klass Club Mix) – 7:19
4. "Friends Forever" (Pump Friction & Precious Paul's Club Mix) – 7:24
5. "Friends Forever" (video)

== Charts ==
=== Weekly charts ===
Chart (1999)	Peak position
Belgium (Ultratip Bubbling Under Flanders)	14
Europe (Eurochart Hot 100)	25
Netherlands (Dutch Top 40)	27
Netherlands (Single Top 100)	65
Scotland (OCC)	5
UK Singles (OCC)	5

=== Year-end charts ===
Chart (1999)	Position
UK Singles (OCC)	152
