= Express (Dina Carroll song) =

1993 single by Dina Carroll

Single by Dina Carroll

from the album So Close
- Released: 3 May 1993
- Genre: Pop; funk; jazz-funk; dance
- Length: 3:38
- Label: A&M
- Songwriters: Dina Carroll; Nigel Lowis
- Producer: Nigel Lowis

Dina Carroll singles chronology
"This Time" (1993)	"Express" (1993)	"Don't Be a Stranger" (1993)

Music video
- "Express" on YouTube

"Express" is a song by British singer and songwriter Dina Carroll, released in May 1993 by A&M Records as the fifth single from her first album, So Close (1993). The song, co written by Carroll with its producer, Nigel Lowis, was a chart success in the UK, peaking at number 12 on the UK Singles Chart. On the Eurochart Hot 100, it peaked at number 44 in June 1993.

== Critical reception ==
Jon O'Brien from AllMusic noted the "jazz-funk" of the song. Everett True from Melody Maker said, "'Express' kinda mixes in one of those cool jazz grooves so favoured by today's crop of happening young rappers with a female vocal which occasionally reminds me of The Lady, Aretha Franklin herself." Pan-European magazine Music & Media remarked that Carroll "uses the Bowie trick of implementing a weird noise just beyond the irritation factor. Very Dina-mic dance stuff." Alan Jones from Music Week gave it three out of five, writing that she "vamps it up on this pop/funk confection, one of the lesser tracks from her outstanding debut album So Close."

In a 2015 retrospective review, Pop Rescue felt that the singer's vocals are "whispery, sometimes sultry". Phil Shanklin of ReviewsRevues stated that it "is unlike anything else on the album. A funky track with a honking sax – Dina comes off like a one-woman En Vogue in this club stomper." James Hamilton from the Record Mirror Dance Update called it a "choppy jiggler". Adam Higginbotham from Select described it as "solid, tastefully-cut soul bleeding subtly into brisk garage beats" and added that it is "careful funky". Another Select editor, Rupert Howe, complimented the song's "aspiration towards funkiness".

== Track listing ==
No.	Title	Writer(s)	Length
1.	"Express" (7-inch radio mix 'West End Remix')	Dina Carroll; Nigel Lowis	3:38
2.	"Express" (12-inch master)	Carroll; Lowis	5:05
3.	"Special Kind of Love" (Brothers in Rhythm remix)	David Cole; Robert Clivillés	7:27
4.	"Ain't No Man" (West End remix)	Carroll; Lowis	8:00

== Personnel ==
- Design – Jeremy Pearce
- Mixing – CJ Mackintosh (tracks 1, 2, 4)
- Photography – Simon Fowler
- Production, original mix – Nigel Lowis (tracks 1, 2, 4)

== Charts ==
Chart (1993)	Peak position
Europe (Eurochart Hot 100)	44
Europe (European Hit Radio)	39
Ireland (IRMA)	28
Israel (Israeli Singles Chart)	30
UK Singles (Official Charts)	12
UK Airplay (Music Week)	2
UK Dance (Music Week)	3
UK Club Chart (Music Week)	5
