= So Close (Dina Carroll song) =

1992 single by Dina Carroll

Single by Dina Carroll

from the album So Close
- B-side: "Why Did I Let You Go?"; "Ain't No Man"; "Special Kind of Love"
- Released: 23 November 1992
- Length: 3:53
- Label: A&M; 1st Avenue
- Songwriters: Dina Carroll; Nigel Lowis
- Producer: Nigel Lowis

Dina Carroll singles chronology
"Special Kind of Love" (1992)	"So Close" (1992)	"This Time" (1993)

Music video
- "So Close" on YouTube

"So Close" is a song by British singer and songwriter Dina Carroll, released in November 1992 by A&M Records and 1st Avenue as the third single from her debut album by the same name (1993). The song was written by Carroll with its producer, Nigel Lowis, and peaked at number 20 on the UK Singles Chart. In the US, it charted on the Billboard Hot 100 and Cash Box Top 100, peaking at numbers 95 and 79. The accompanying music video was directed by German feature film director and producer Marcus Nispel, featuring Carroll performing in Apollo Theatre.

== Critical reception ==
Larry Flick from Billboard magazine described the song as a "plush ballad". He noted that Carroll's "rich and appealing alto is cushioned by soft keyboard lines and warm backing harmonies." Dave Sholin from the Gavin Report complimented "this tastefully-produced, rhythmic ballad". In his weekly UK chart commentary, James Masterton said, "Yep, it's Christmas alright which means that disco divas such as Ms Carroll can follow up club classics like 'Ain't No Man' and 'Special Kind of Love' with a ballad without any loss of credibility." A reviewer from Music Week praised the song as a "soulful" and "mature, shimmering, polished ballad on a par with some of Lisa Stansfield's finest work". Jonathan Bernstein from Spin named it an "instant hit" and described it as "moist".

== Track listings ==
- 12-inch single, UK (1992)
1. "So Close"
2. "Why Did I Let You Go?"
3. "Ain't No Man" (Brothers in Rhythm remix)
4. "Special Kind of Love" (A Kinda Love mix)
- CD single, UK (1992)
1. "So Close" (radio mix) — 3:53
2. "Why Did I Let You Go?" (EP edit) — 3:28
3. "Ain't No Man" — 7:08
4. "Special Kind of Love" (A Kinda Love mix) — 6:40

== Charts ==
Chart (1992–1993)	Peak position
Canada Top Singles (RPM)	57
Europe (Eurochart Hot 100)	75
Europe (European Dance Radio)	5
UK Singles (Official Charts)	20
UK Airplay (Music Week)	15
UK Dance (Music Week)	5
UK Club Chart (Music Week)	13
US Billboard Hot 100	95
US Cash Box Top 100	79

== Release history ==
Region	Date	Format(s)	Label(s)	Ref.
United Kingdom	23 November 1992	7-inch vinyl; 12-inch vinyl; CD; cassette	A&M; 1st Avenue	
Japan	25 March 1993	Mini-CD	A&M	
