= Ronnie Herel =

DJ and radio presenter

- Born: United Kingdom
- Occupation(s): DJ, radio presenter
- Known for: "It's Too Late", Brand New Heavies

Ronnie Herel is a DJ, radio presenter, and previously a recording artist with dance music production duo Quartz. Herel has hosted shows on BBC Radio 1Xtra, BBC Radio 1, and can be heard on the London station Mi-Soul.

As one half of the dance production duo Quartz, he had a number of hits in the early 1990s. The first of these was "Meltdown" followed by "It's Too Late" featuring the vocals of Dina Carroll which reached No. 8 on the UK charts in 1991. "Naked Love (Just Say You Want Me)" also reached the top 40 in 1991. He has also performed on releases by the Brand New Heavies and collaborated with Clubland. More recently, he worked with DJ LJ Blends.

In the mid-late 1990s, he was co-director of the record shop Uptown Records.

Herel broadcast on BBC Radio 1Xtra between August 2003 and August 2012, including "The Basement" and "1xtra Chart show". In October 2012, he moved to Mi-Soul, initially hosting the Monday night "Big R&B show", and more recently weekday 'drive-time'.

He has also previously been nominated for two MOBO awards in the categories of Best Radio Show and UK Best Club DJ and was voted Best Club DJ by readers of Blues & Soul magazine in 2000. He was also nominated for Best DJ at the Urban Music Awards 2008.
