= Without Love (Dina Carroll song) =

1999 single by Dina Carroll

Single by Dina Carroll
- Released: 12 July 1999
- Studio: Sound Gallery
- Length: 3:36
- Label: Manifesto; 1st Avenue
- Songwriter(s): Berny Cosgrove; Kevin Clark
- Producer(s): Alastair Johnson; Laurence Nelson

Dina Carroll singles chronology
"One, Two, Three" (1998)	"Without Love" (1999)	"It's Only Rock 'n Roll" (1999)

Music video
- "Without Love" on YouTube

"Without Love" is a song by English singer Dina Carroll, released as a standalone single on 12 July 1999. Produced by Alastair Johnson and Laurence Nelson, it, along with a host of remixes to suit all sections of the club scene, re-established her place in the UK music scene, reaching number 13 on the UK Singles Chart. The music video shows Carroll, dressed in black, performing with 10 dancers against a white backdrop.

== Track listings ==
UK CD1 (1999)
No.	Title	Length
1.	"Without Love" (Dave Sears radio edit)	3:32
2.	"On & On"	4:19
3.	"Without Love" (Mood II Swing Special Mix)	6:52

UK CD2 (1999)
No.	Title	Length
1.	"Without Love" (Dave Sears extended mix)	6:29
2.	"Without Love" (Tall Paul Remix)	7:14
3.	"Livin' for the Weekend" (The Space Brothers Mix)	6:08

UK cassette single (1999)
No.	Title	Length
1.	"Without Love" (Dave Sears radio edit)	3:32
2.	"On & On"	4:19

== Charts ==
=== Weekly charts ===
Chart (1999)	Peak position
Europe (Eurochart Hot 100)	46
Scotland (OCC)	12
UK Singles (OCC)	13

=== Year-end charts ===
Chart (1999)	Position
UK Singles (OCC)	192
