= Brit Award for British Producer of the Year =

British music award

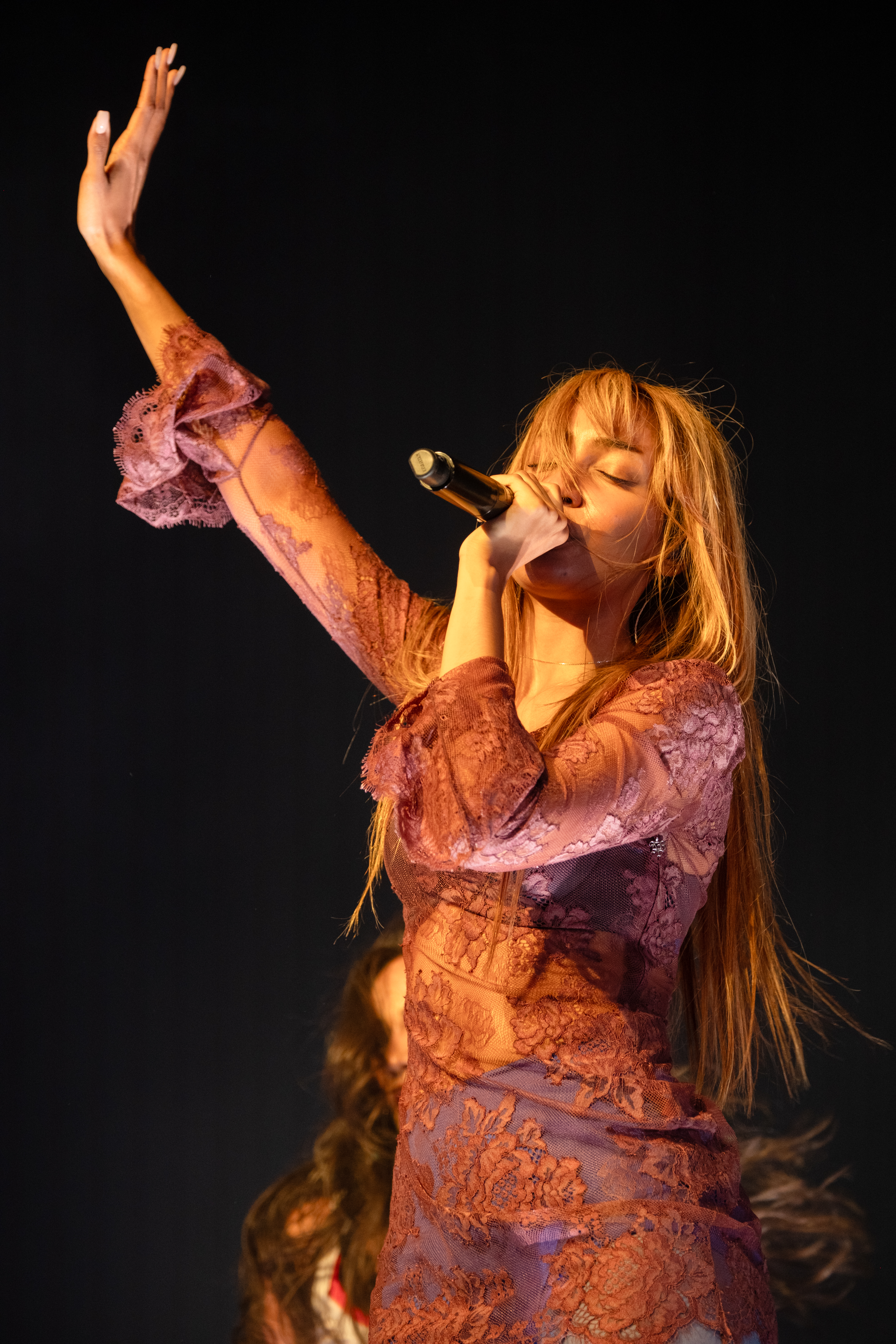
- 2026 winner PinkPantheress
- Awarded for: Achievement in excellent British producer
- Country: United Kingdom (UK)
- Presented by: British Phonographic Industry (BPI)
- First award: 1977
- Currently held by: PinkPantheress (2026)

Highlights
- Most awards: Paul Epworth; Trevor Horn; David A. Stewart (3 each)
- Most nominations: Trevor Horn (8)
- Website: www.brits.co.uk

The Brit Award for British Producer of the Year is an award given by the British Phonographic Industry (BPI), an organisation which represents record companies and artists in the United Kingdom. The accolade is presented at the Brit Awards, an annual celebration of British and international music. The award was first presented in 1977. It was not presented in 1989, between 1999 and 2008, in 2017 or 2021. As of the 38th Brit Awards in 2018, the winner is selected by a jury and no nominees are announced.

The inaugural recipient of the award is George Martin, best known for his work with The Beatles. Until 2026, Kate Bush in 1990 is the only solo woman to have been nominated for the award, though Heather Small and Alison Goldfrapp were nominated as part of M People and Goldfrapp in 1994 and 2015 respectively. Trevor Horn, David A. Stewart and Paul Epworth hold the record for most wins in this category, with three each. Brian Eno is the only other producer to have won the award more than once, winning in both 1994 and 1996. Dean Cover, professionally known as Inflo, was also the first black person to win the award. In 2023, the award was presented to French DJ David Guetta, who became the first international recipient. The award in 2025 was received by A.G. Cook. The current holder of the award is PinkPantheress, who received it on 28 February 2026, making history as the first female artist and the youngest ever artist to receive the award since its creation in 1977.

== Winners and nominees ==
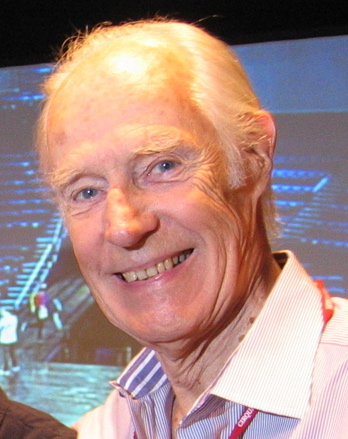
Inaugural winner George Martin

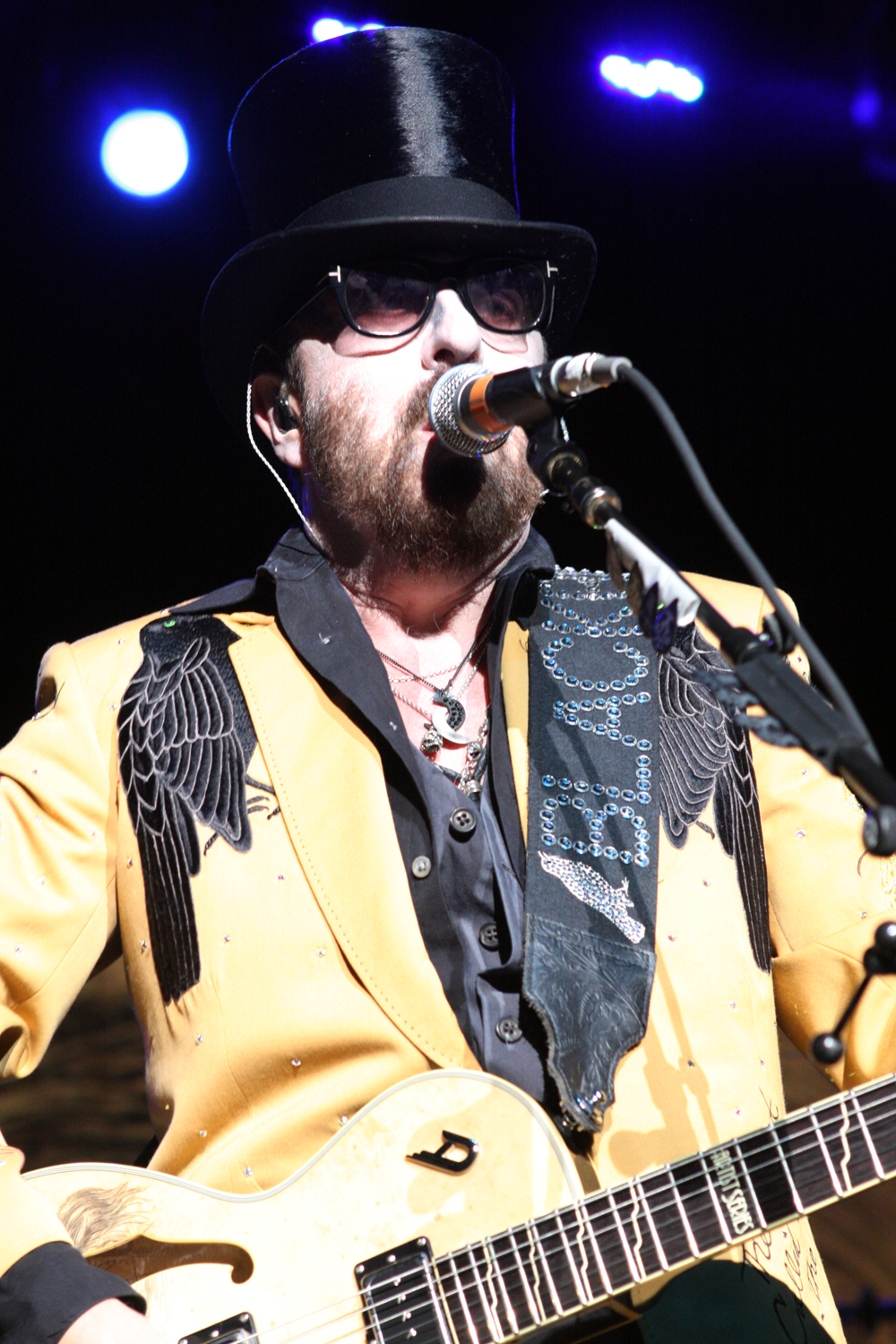
Three-time winner David A. Stewart

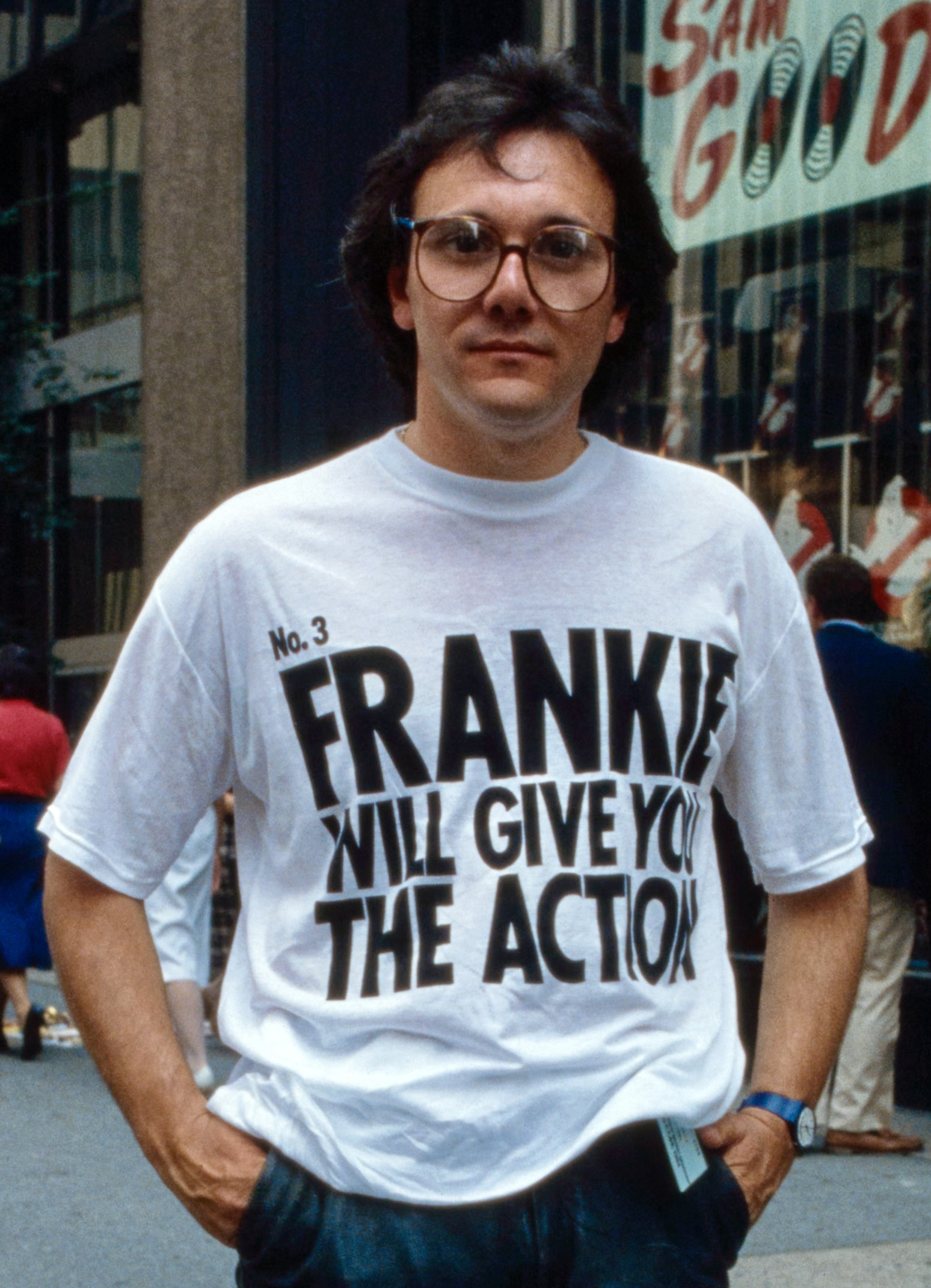
Three-time winner Trevor Horn

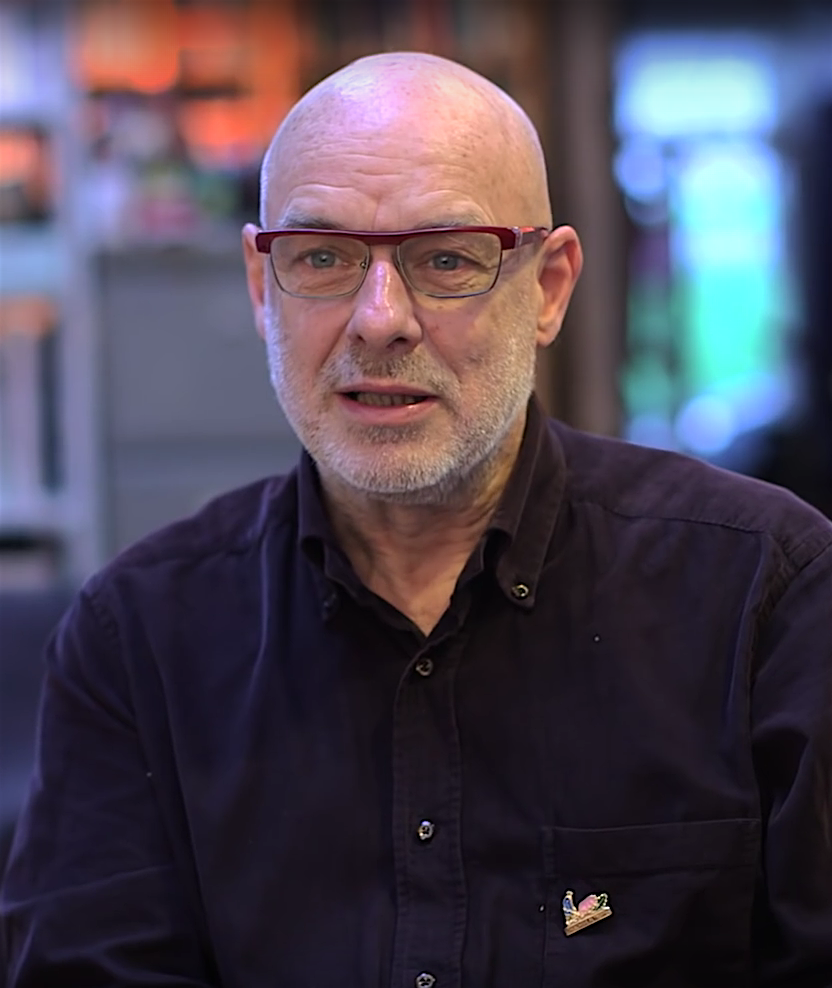
Two-time winner Brian Eno

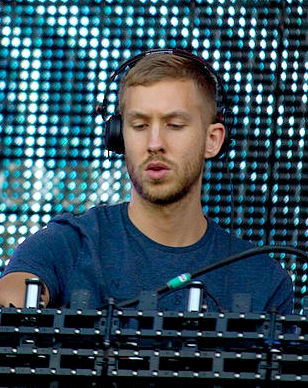
2019 winner Calvin Harris

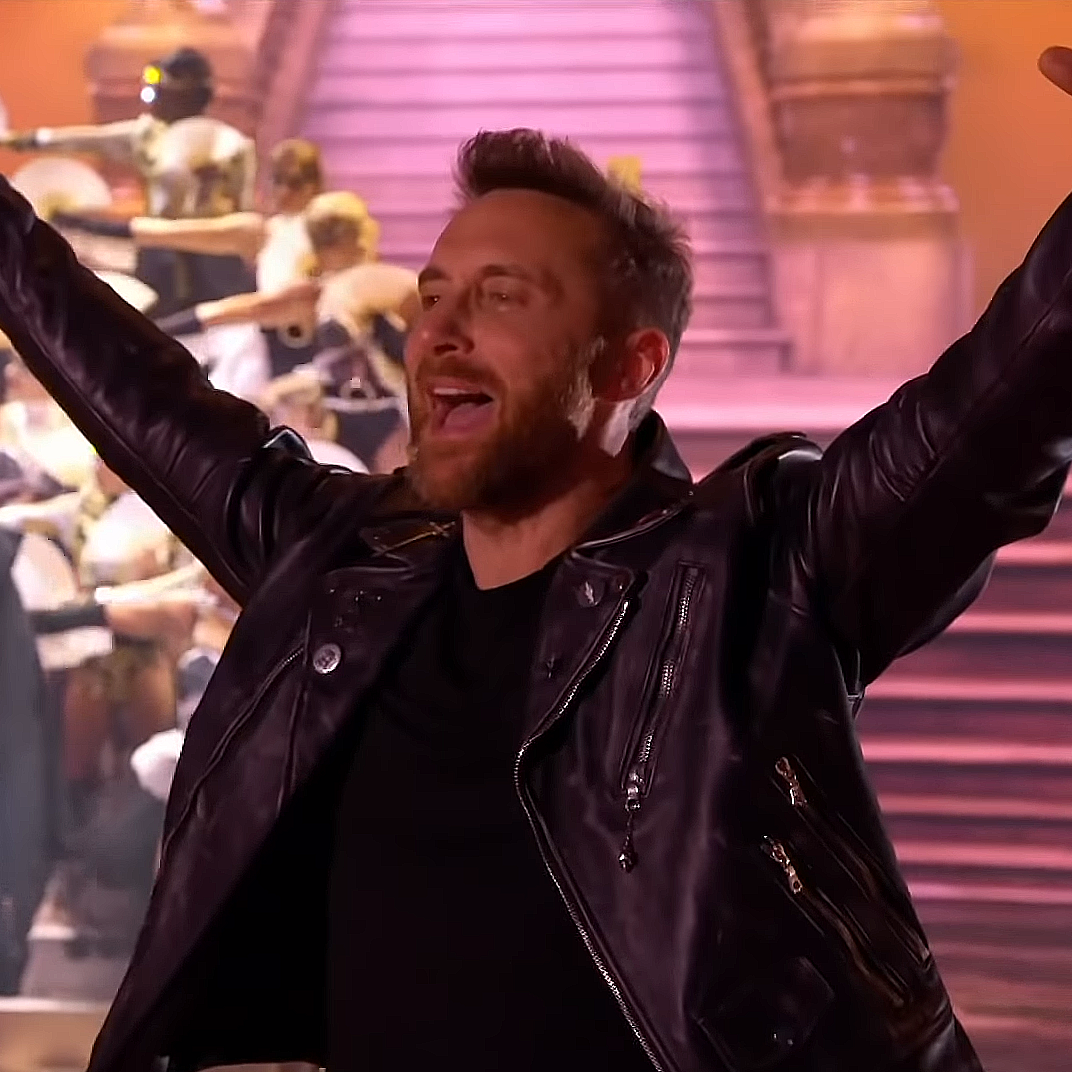
David Guetta, the first non-British recipient of the award, won in 2023

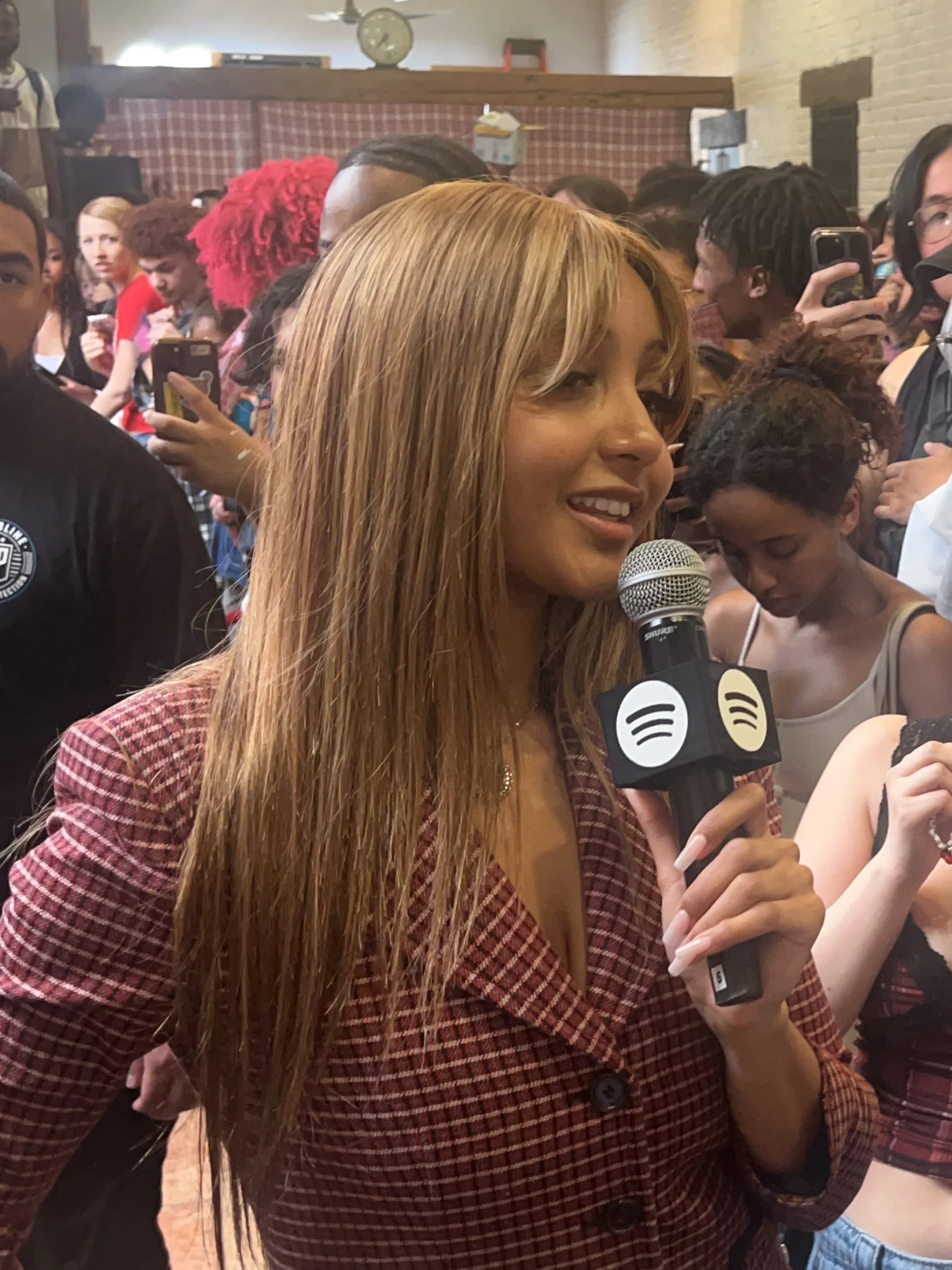
PinkPantheress, the first woman and youngest ever artist to win the award, won in 2026

Year	Recipient	Nominees
1977	George Martin	Gus Dudgeon; Glyn Johns; Mickie Most
1982	Martin Rushent	Stuart Colman; Chris Neill
1983	Trevor Horn	George Martin; Martin Rushent; Alan Winstanley & Clive Langer
1984	Steve Levine	Peter Collins; Steve Lillywhite; Trevor Horn; Alan Winstanley & Clive Langer
1985	Trevor Horn	Peter Collins; Jolley & Swain; Laurie Latham; Steve Lillywhite
1986	David A. Stewart	Trevor Horn; Chris Hughes; Steve Lillywhite; Hugh Padgham
1987	David A. Stewart	Trevor Horn; Hugh Padgham; Stock Aitken Waterman; Pip Williams
1988	Stock Aitken Waterman	Brian Eno; Julian Mendelsohn; Paul Staveley O'Duffy; Alan Tarney
1989	Not Awarded	
1990	David A. Stewart	Kate Bush; Coldcut; Peter Gabriel; Steve Lillywhite; Stock Aitken Waterman
1991	Chris Thomas	Nellee Hooper; George Michael; Paul Oakenfold & Steve Osborne; Youth
1992	Trevor Horn	Mark Knopfler; Johnny Marr; David A. Stewart; Stock Aitken Waterman; Youth
1993	Peter Gabriel	Trevor Horn; Stephen Lipson; Paul Oakenfold & Steve Osborne; Pete Waterman
1994	Brian Eno	Flood; M People; Nellee Hooper; Youth
1995	Nellee Hooper	Ed Buller; Flood; Trevor Horn; Stephen Street
1996	Brian Eno	Noel Gallagher & Owen Morris; Nellee Hooper; John Leckie; Stephen Street
1997	John Leckie	Absolute, Andy Bradfield, Matt Rowe & Richard Stannard; Mike Hedges; Hugh Jones; Tricky
1998	Chris Potter, The Verve & Youth	Nigel Godrich & Radiohead; Liam Howlett; Roni Size; Stephen Street
1999–2008	Not Awarded	
2009	Bernard Butler	Brian Eno; Steve Mac
2010	Paul Epworth	Jim Abbiss; Ethan Johns; Steve Lillywhite
2011	Markus Dravs	Ethan Johns; John Leckie; Mike Pela; Stuart Price
2012	Ethan Johns	Paul Epworth; Flood
2013	Paul Epworth	Damon Albarn; Jake Gosling
2014	Alan Moulder & Flood	Paul Epworth; Ethan Johns
2015	Paul Epworth	Flood; Goldfrapp; Jake Gosling
2016	Charlie Andrew	Mike Crossey; Tom Dalgety; Mark Ronson
2017	Not Awarded	
2018	Steve Mac	—N/a
2019	Calvin Harris	—N/a
2020	Fred Again	—N/a
2021	Not Awarded	
2022	Inflo	—N/a
2023	David Guetta	—N/a
2024	Chase & Status	—N/a
2025	A. G. Cook	—N/a
2026	PinkPantheress	

== Multiple nominations and awards ==
Artists that received multiple nominations
Nominations	Artist
8	Trevor Horn
5	Paul Epworth
5	Flood
5	Steve Lillywhite
4	Brian Eno
4	Nellee Hooper
4	Ethan Johns
4	David A. Stewart
4	Stock Aitken Waterman
4	Youth
3	John Leckie
3	Stephen Street
2	Peter Collins
2	Peter Gabriel
2	Jake Gosling
2	Clive Langer
2	Steve Mac
2	George Martin
2	Paul Oakenfold
2	Steve Osborne
2	Hugh Padgham
2	Martin Rushent
2	Alan Winstanley

Artists that received multiple awards
Awards	Artist
3	Paul Epworth
3	Trevor Horn
3	David A. Stewart
2	Brian Eno

== Notes ==
- Peter Gabriel (1993) also won Brit Award for British Male Solo Artist
- The Verve (1998) also won Brit Award for British Group
