= Thunderbugs (band) =

British girl group

- Origin: England
- Genres: Pop
- Years active: 1997–1999
- Labels: First Avenue; Epic
- Past members: Brigitta Jansen; Nicky Shaw; Stef Maillard; Jane Vaughan

Thunderbugs were a British girl group, briefly popular in 1999, who played their own instruments. Their one major hit, "Friends Forever", reached number five in the UK Singles Chart in September 1999. Their follow-up single, "It's About Time You Were Mine", failed to reach the Top 40 in December 1999. Due to this flop, the album Delicious was postponed to 2000, released on minidisc in the UK and on CD in continental Europe.

== Members of the group ==
- Jane Vaughan: lead vocals
- Stef Maillard: bass and backing vocals
- Nicky Shaw: drums and backing vocals
- Brigitta Jansen: guitar

== Discography ==
=== Studio albums ===
- Delicious (2000)
  1. It's About Time You Were Mine
  2. Friends Forever
  3. Walking On Air
  4. You Got Something On Me
  5. You And Me
  6. Does Your Heart Still Break
  7. Angel Of The Morning
  8. Miracle Baby
  9. Jealous
  10. Delicious
  11. Alright Now

=== Singles ===
- "Friends Forever" (1999) - UK #5
- "It's About Time You Were Mine" (1999) - UK #43
