= Only Human (Dina Carroll song) =

Single by Dina Carroll

from the album Only Human
- Released: 9 December 1996
- Genre: Pop
- Length: 5:17
- Label: 1st Avenue; Mercury
- Songwriter(s): Mike S. Riley; Vikki Wells
- Producer(s): Nigel Lowis

Dina Carroll singles chronology
"Escaping" (1996)	"Only Human" (1996)	"Livin' for the Weekend" (1998)

Music video
- "Only Human" on YouTube

"Only Human" is a 1996 song by British singer Dina Carroll. It was released as the third single from her second album by the same name (1996), and peaked at number 33 in both Scotland and the UK.

== Critical reception ==
A reviewer from Music Week rated the song three out of five, writing, "Much more simplistic orchestrally and vocally than her last hit Escaping, this ballad has that Christmassey sound which should propel it into the Top 10."

== Track listing ==
CD single, Europe (1996)
No.	Title	Length
1.	"Only Human"	5:17
2.	"Run to You"	5:02
3.	"I Had a Dream"	4:39
4.	"Same Old Feeling"	4:55

== Charts ==
Chart (1996)	Peak position
Scotland (OCC)	33
UK Singles (OCC)	33
