= Clubland (band) =

Swedish house-music group

- Origin: Sweden
- Genres: house
- Years active: 1990–

Clubland was a Swedish/British house music act assembled in 1990 by BTECH label boss/producer Jan Ekholm and British duo Dave Rawlings and Ronnie Herel of Quartz. British musician Morgan King joined them later as a songwriter. Lead vocals for the first album Themes from Outer Clubland were variously performed by the American hip house duo 2 in a Room, British rapper Stepz, and Swedish singers Zemya Hamilton and Kayo Shekoni. In 1991, Ekholm reformed the act with members now comprising singer Zemya Hamilton and Morgan King.

== Biography ==
Between 1991 and 1992, five songs charted on the US Billboard Hot Dance Music/Club Play chart, with three of those hitting number-one: "Let's Get Busy" (credited to Clubland featuring Quartz) (1990), "Hold On (Tighter to Love)" (1992) and "Hypnotized" (1992). Another single, "Set Me Free", hit number-one on the US Hot Dance Singles Sales chart and number 2 on the Hot Dance Music/Club Play chart. In 1993, they won a Swedish Grammy for Best Album with their second album, Adventures Beyond Clubland.

Zemya Hamilton (Zemya Sylveta Larsson Auna) died on 24 December 2015 from multiple sclerosis, aged 50.

== Discography ==
=== Albums ===
- Themes from Outer Clubland (1991)
- Clubland featuring Zemya Hamilton (1992)
- Adventures Beyond Clubland (1992)
- Secrets of Inner Clubland (Clubland featuring Zemya Hamilton) (1995)

=== Singles ===
Year	Single	Peak chart positions						Album
Year	Single	AUS	NED	SWE	UK	US	US Dance	Album
1990	"Let's Get Busy (Pump It Up)" (featuring Quartz)	139	32	—	86	—	1	Themes from Outer Clubland (Keep It Pumping)
1991	"Pump the Sound (Like a Megablast)" (Europe only)	—	—	—	—	—	—	Themes from Outer Clubland (Keep It Pumping)
1991	"Hold On (Tighter to Love)"	—	—	17	—	79	1	Themes from Outer Clubland (Keep It Pumping)
1992	"I'm Under (Love Strain)" (Europe only)	—	—	—	—	—	—	Adventures Beyond Clubland
1992	"Set Me Free"	—	—	—	—	90	2	Adventures Beyond Clubland
1992	"Hypnotized"	—	—	—	—	—	1	Adventures Beyond Clubland
1992	"Come Rain, Come Shine" (US only)	—	—	—	—	—	39	Adventures Beyond Clubland
1992	"Hot for You" (featuring Quartz) (UK only)	—	—	—	—	—	—	Single only
1995	"Cry" (Sweden only)	—	—	8	—	—	—	The Secrets of Inner Clubland
1995	"Peace of Luv" (Europe & UK only)	—	—	24	148	—	—	The Secrets of Inner Clubland
1995	"Gimme Love Gimme All" (Europe only)	—	—	—	—	—	—	The Secrets of Inner Clubland
1995	"Open Your Eyes" (Japan only)	—	—	—	—	—	—	The Secrets of Inner Clubland
"—" denotes releases that did not chart or were not released.

== See also ==
- List of number-one dance hits (United States)
- List of artists who reached number one on the US Dance chart
