= Dina Carroll =

English singer

- Also known as: Masquerade (1985)
- Born: Geraldine Carroll; 21 August 1968 (age 58); Newmarket, Suffolk, England
- Genre: Soul
- Occupations: Singer; songwriter
- Years active: 1985–present
- Labels: A&M; Mercury; 1st Avenue

Geraldine "Dina" Carroll (born 21 August 1968) is an English singer and songwriter. She had a string of hits during the 1990s, including the UK top ten singles "It's Too Late" (1991), "Don't Be a Stranger" (1993), "The Perfect Year" (1993), and "Escaping" (1996). Carroll released two studio albums, So Close (1993) and Only Human (1996), both of which reached number two on the UK Albums Chart and were certified platinum. She won Best British Female Solo Artist at the 1994 Brit Awards.

== Early career ==
Carroll was born in Newmarket, England, to a Scottish-Irish mother and an African-American father. She started singing aged five, and despite the lack of formal vocal coaching, she won a local talent competition in 1981, at the age of thirteen, with her rendition of Barbra Streisand's "Woman in Love". After leaving school, she worked in various jobs, including a one-day stint as a chambermaid in a Cambridge hotel in 1985.

At the age of sixteen, she was signed to Morgan Khan's London-based record label StreetSounds, primarily a compilations company known for its electro music albums. Carroll moved to West London and recorded two singles for the company's StreetWave dance music singles label called "Set It Off" and "One Nation". Released in 1985, both records were credited to a non-existent group called Masquerade, with "One Nation" being a track based around a number of Parliament-Funkadelic songs such as "One Nation Under a Groove" and "Tear the Roof off the Sucker (Give Up the Funk)". After six unproductive months, she left StreetSounds/StreetWave, with Khan going on to use the Masquerade name again for the number 64 hit "(Solution to) The Problem" and a megamix called the "Streetsounds Real Thing Mix".

In 1989, Carroll secured a recording contract with Jive Records/Zomba and released a number of singles in 1989 and 1990. Of particular note was her cover of Dionne Warwick's classic "Walk On By", co-produced by The Pasadenas who also provided vocal arrangement and backing vocals. Although "Walk On By" did not make it to the UK top 40 (peaking at number 95), it was a minor hit in continental Europe. Other solo releases during that era included "People All Around the World" and "Me Sienta Sola (We Are One)", the latter being an underground club hit in the New York scene. In 1990, Carroll provided the vocals to Brothers in Rhythm's single "Peace and Harmony" and Simon Harris's "Don't Stop the Music" (guesting with Monte Luv on this Music of Life single), but unlike the former's "Such a Good Feeling" and the latter's "Bass (How Low Can You Go)", both tracks failed to reach the top 40.

After a short time at Jive Records, Carroll was spotted by Oliver Smallman, one half of First Avenue Management, a small and newly founded management group. First Avenue were already managing a dance production duo called Quartz, made up of Ronnie Herel and Dave Rawlings, and so Carroll was brought in to provide vocals for the duo on their cover of Carole King's "It's Too Late". This cover topped the dance charts and reached No. 8 in the UK Singles Chart in early 1991, so a follow-up collaboration was also recorded. This follow-up single was called "Naked Love (Just Say You Want Me)" and reached number 39 in the UK Singles Chart, becoming the last hit single for Quartz.

After these two singles with Quartz, First Avenue decided to relaunch Carroll as a solo artist, and was signed to A&M Records by managing director Howard Berman. Carroll's first solo single, produced and co-written by Nigel Lowis, "Ain't No Man", was released in June 1992, reaching number 16 in the chart.

== Success ==
To capitalise on the momentum of "Ain't No Man", Carroll and Lowis worked on future singles together, one of which being the top 20 hit "So Close", which was released in December 1992. Carroll was approached by Robert Clivillés and David Cole of C&C Music Factory, who invited her to New York to become the first British artist to work with them. Carroll interrupted the writing and recording of her album to record "Special Kind of Love", which also reached number 16 in the UK Singles Chart.

The album So Close was released in March 1993 and entered the top 10 of the UK Albums Chart.

The album continued to generate a string of hits, such as "This Time" (No. 23) and "Express" (No. 12). One of the tracks on the album, "Don't Be a Stranger", a cover version of a song originally recorded by Chyna, was the sixth single from the album, but a new version was recorded for the single release, with the London Session Orchestra providing strings for a new backing track. This completely transformed the song, and when it was released, it became Carroll's biggest chart hit, reaching No. 3 and spending many weeks inside the top 10.

Carroll announced her first British tour for November and December 1993 with Eternal as supporting guests. To round off a highly successful 1993, Carroll recorded her version of "The Perfect Year" from Andrew Lloyd Webber's "Sunset Boulevard" and released it in December 1993. This was another top 5 hit, peaking at No. 5, and Carroll was to become the only British female to have two singles simultaneously in the top 10 that decade, with "Don't Be a Stranger" still holding high when "The Perfect Year" entered the charts.

Carroll was named Best Female Artist at the BRIT Awards in February 1994. She then took a break from her recording and touring obligations, stating that she felt "burned out". Although no new records were released, the album So Close extended its unbroken residency in the top 10 for the main part in 1994, eventually selling more than 1.5 million copies in the United Kingdom, making it the fourth biggest-selling album of the year in the United Kingdom, and until Dido's No Angel, the biggest selling debut album by a female artist in the history of the UK charts. The album was also short-listed for the Mercury Music Prize. Towards the end of the year, Carroll announced another national tour in December, selling out over 15 dates.

Rumours of new songs from Carroll started to surface in the summer of 1995, but instead of releasing them, she found herself in the midst of contractual problems. Howard Berman, who had originally signed her to A&M, had moved to Mercury Records, but there were problems in convincing them to move Carroll with him. Eventually, Mercury agreed but it was not until May 1996 that the release of a new single was confirmed. "Escaping", a song written by Barry Blue, first recorded by New Zealander Margaret Urlich in 1989 and subsequently a minor hit for Asia Blue in 1992, was finally released in September, almost three years after Carroll's last record.

The song entered the chart at No. 3. The B-side track, "Mind Body & Soul", on the other hand, topped the club chart, re-establishing Dina's dominance in the dance genre.

A new album, Only Human, followed in October. It debuted at No. 2 on the album charts, equalling the position of her debut So Close. "Only Human" was released as a double A-sided (with "Run to You") Christmas single for 1996, but was Carroll's least successful single since "Naked Love", reaching No. 33. Subsequently, no more singles were released from the album, although the popular "Living for the Weekend", co-produced by David Morales, was released on 12" and became a big club smash.

During the recording of Only Human, Carroll discovered that she had developed otosclerosis, a hereditary bone disease that affected her ears. She postponed treatment until after all her recording duties had been fulfilled. She had an operation to replace a whole eardrum, but went back to work almost immediately to promote the album. Although any dislodgement by noise could have cost her the sense of hearing, Carroll made a reasonable recovery, despite some inevitable permanent loss. Overall, Carroll considered the making of the second album a very dispiriting experience, and often described Only Human as a "lost baby", despite it selling 500,000 copies and achieving Platinum status.

Carroll was nominated for "Best British Female Artist" in the 1997 BRIT Awards. She then went into artistic hibernation, and although there were press reviews of tracks such as "Livin' for the Weekend" (reviewed in Billboard Magazine as a promo US single), the decision was made to concentrate on the making of the third album rather than release more singles from the second as Mercury were happy with the sales figures off the back of just two singles.

She returned to the drawing board in 1998 for her third album. For this, she went to Los Angeles to work with producer Rhett Lawrence, most famous for his production of Mariah Carey's début album. The collaboration was originally intended for only three tracks, but they ended up recording a full album in Rhett's home studio. The lead single was "One, Two, Three", a radio-friendly mid-tempo love song. This was released in October 1998, with new remixes of "Livin' for the Weekend" to satisfy both her pop and dance music fans. It was her third single to reach No. 16 in the charts.

The new album, Dina Carroll, was originally planned for release at the end of 1998, including her cover of the Dusty Springfield song "Son of a Preacher Man".

"Son of a Preacher Man" was originally planned as the follow-up single to "One, Two Three". However, due to the untimely death of Dusty Springfield in early 1999, this single was withheld. At the same time, the album was postponed, because Carroll was not totally happy with some of the mixes on the album. Instead, Carroll's record company decided to relaunch her as a dance diva. A new up-tempo track, "Without Love", was chosen to be the next single, with a host of remixes to suit all sections of the club scene. The single continued her uninterrupted string of Dance Chart-toppers, and re-established her place in the UK music scene when released in July 1999, reaching No. 13 in the UK Singles Chart.

A follow-up single, "Say You Love Me", was scheduled for release in November 1999. Part of the promotion saw Carroll performing the track live on Dale Winton's Saturday night Lottery Show. The remixed version of the album was planned to follow this single two weeks later. However, Mercury suspended the release of the single, and both the single and the album were shelved. However, Carroll appeared on the charity single "It's Only Rock 'n Roll" along with many other stars such as the Spice Girls. It reached No. 19 in the Christmas charts of 1999.

== Later career ==
In 2000, First Avenue Management entered into a crisis phase when most of their artists were dropped by their labels, including Eternal, Louise, Dana Dawson, Kele Le Roc, Honeyz, Kéllé Bryan and Michelle Gayle. All of their acts had declining record sales, and Carroll was also caught up in this so left First Avenue at the end of 2000.

In 2001, Carroll released a new single and a greatest hits compilation, The Very Best of Dina Carroll. Carroll's cover version of Van Morrison's "Someone Like You", featured in the Bridget Jones's Diary soundtrack, reached number 38. The album entered the UK Albums Chart at No. 15.

In 2003, Carroll recorded a version of the Randy Crawford song "Almaz".

In 2016, Carroll appeared as a guest vocalist on "We Bring the Party" by the Dig Band, produced by long time collaborator Nigel Lowis.

Carroll made her live comeback in 2016 as the headline act on the "David Gest Is Not Dead but Alive With Soul" tour.

== Awards and nominations ==
Award	Year	Nominee(s)	Category	Result	Ref.
Brit Awards	1993	Herself	British Breakthrough Act	Nominated	
Brit Awards	1994	Herself	British Female Solo Artist	Won	
Brit Awards	1994	So Close	British Album of the Year	Nominated	
Brit Awards	1994	"Don't Be a Stranger"	British Single of the Year	Nominated	
Brit Awards	1997	Herself	British Female Solo Artist	Nominated	

== Discography ==
=== Albums ===
Year	Album	UK	Certifications
1993	So Close	2	BPI: 4× Platinum
1996	Only Human	2	BPI: Platinum
2001	The Very Best of Dina Carroll	15	BPI: Silver
2005	The Collection	―	
"—" denotes releases that did not chart.

=== Singles ===
Year	Song	Peak chart positions			Certifications
Year	Song	UK	IRE	US	Certifications
1985	"Set It Off" (with Masquerade)	86	—	—	
1985	"One Nation" (with Masquerade)	54	—	—	
1989	"People All Around the World"	123	—	—	
1989	"Me Sienta Sola (We Are One)"	—	—	—	
1989	"Walk On By"	95	—	—	
1990	"Peace and Harmony" (with Brothers in Rhythm)	94	—	—	
1990	"Don't Stop the Music" (with Simon Harris and Monte Luv)	84	—	—	
1991	"It's Too Late" (Quartz introducing Dina Carroll)	8	—	—	
1991	"Naked Love (Just Say You Want Me)" (Quartz and Dina Carroll)	39	—	—	
1992	"Ain't No Man"	16	—	—	
1992	"Special Kind of Love"	16	—	—	
1992	"So Close"	20	—	95	
1993	"This Time"	23	—	—	
1993	"Express"	12	28	—	
1993	"Don't Be a Stranger"	3	6	—	BPI: Silver
1993	"The Perfect Year"	5	4	—	BPI: Silver
1996	"Escaping"	3	14	—	
1996	"Only Human"/"Run to You"	33	—	—	
1998	"Livin' for the Weekend"	—	—	—	
1998	"One, Two, Three"	16	—	—	
1999	"Without Love"	13	—	—	
1999	"It's Only Rock 'n Roll" (various artists charity single)	19	—	—	
2001	"Someone Like You"	38	—	—	
2016	"We Bring the Party" (with the Dig Band)	—	—	—	
"—" denotes releases that did not chart or were not released in that territory.
