= Livin' for the Weekend (Dina Carroll song) =

Single by Dina Carroll

from the album Only Human
- Released: 1998
- Recorded: 1996
- Genre: Soul
- Length: 3:49
- Label: Mercury
- Songwriters: Dina Carroll, Nigel Lowis, David Morales
- Producers: Nigel Lewis, David Morales

Dina Carroll singles chronology
"Only Human" (1996)	"Livin' for the Weekend" (1998)	"One, Two, Three" (1998)

Music video
- "Livin' for the Weekend" on YouTube

"Livin' for the Weekend" is a song by English singer Dina Carroll, from her second studio album, Only Human (1996). It was co-produced by Nigel Lowis and David Morales. The record was a dance club hit in the UK.

In 1998, the song was remixed by Canny and released as a single in Europe, a music video was also produced. In the UK, this version was included on the release of the single "One, two, three". It achieved moderate success in the charts and reached #80 in France.

== Critical reception ==
The single received mixed reviews in Europe. Jon O'Brien from AllMusic described it as "Black Box-esque". Portugal's Manchete commented that Carroll failed to distinguish herself from Mariah Carey even in "Livin' for the Weekend". Vikki Tobak for Vibe wrote that the song and "Mind Body & Soul" are "dance-floor sure shots that complement Dina's smooth, textured vocals."

== Charts ==
Chart (1998)	Peak position
France (SNEP)	80
