= This Time (Dina Carroll song) =

1993 single by Dina Carroll

Single by Dina Carroll

from the album So Close
- Released: 15 February 1993
- Length: 3:50
- Label: A&M
- Songwriters: Dina Carroll; Nigel Lowis
- Producer: Nigel Lowis

Dina Carroll singles chronology
"So Close" (1992)	"This Time" (1993)	"Express" (1993)

Music video
- "This Time" on YouTube

"This Time" is a song by British singer-songwriter Dina Carroll, released on 15 February 1993 by A&M Records as the fourth single from her debut album, So Close (1993). The song was written by Carroll with Nigel Lowis, who also produced it. It features strings by the New York Philharmonic Orchestra, peaking at number 23 on the UK Singles Chart and number 78 on the Eurochart Hot 100. The accompanying music video was directed by Michael Geoghegan.

== Critical reception ==
In his weekly UK chart commentary, James Masterton wrote that "This Time" follows the format of the Christmas hit "So Close" with "a slushy ballad that may just fail to capture the public imagination." Pan-European magazine Music & Media stated that Carroll is "more than just a dance diva with catchy repertoire. She can actually sing. The best way to prove that is always the ballad test, and she succeeds hands down." Alan Jones from Music Week gave the song a score of four out of five and named it Pick of the Week, describing it as a "torchy ballad" and a "pretty and expensively produced song, [where] Carroll takes advantage of a lush, spacious mix to show her pedigree to fine effect." James Hamilton from the Record Mirror Dance Update called it a "smash-bound" and "gorgeous" ballad.

In a retrospective review, Pop Rescue said that "musically and vocally [it's] a really nice warm song – with plenty of space for Dina to show off her vocal diversity." Phil Shanklin of ReviewsRevues complimented the "strong interplay" between her and the background vocalists, who would later be singing in the British R&B girl group Eternal. He commented, "This backing vocal/lead vocal combination are a feature of this CD as well as the big cavernous, echoing sound which turns this track into a real power-house and emphasises the quality of Dina’s vocals." Tony Mortimer from East 17 reviewed the song for Smash Hits, stating, "This girl's gonna be massive". He added that "Gladys Knight probably inspired her somewhere along the line. I'd really like this to be a hit, it's slow and smoochy. Brilliant."

== Music video ==
A black-and-white music video was produced to promote the song, directed by Irish filmmaker Michael Geoghegan. The opening of the video sees Caroll singing while sitting on a stage, while confetti falls on her. She is dressed in white and around her lies white light balls. Other scenes shows the singer by a piano or peeking out from behind a black stage curtain. Occasionally, a man appears, either photographing with an old camera, playing with cards or dancing. Several animals can be seen throughout the video, such as a white cat, a white bird and fish in a bowl of water.

== Track listings ==
12-inch single, UK (1993)
No.	Title	Length
1.	"This Time"
2.	"Falling"
3.	"Why Did I Let You Go" (Phil Kelsey Remix)
4.	"Express" (Xpressed Dub)

CD single, Europe (1993)
No.	Title	Length
1.	"This Time" (Radio Mix)
2.	"Falling"

CD single, Europe (1993)
No.	Title	Length
1.	"This Time" (Radio Mix)	3:50
2.	"Falling"	7:02
3.	"Why Did I Let You Go?" (Phil Kelsey Remix)	6:51

== Charts ==
=== Weekly charts ===
Chart (1993)	Peak position
Europe (Eurochart Hot 100)	78
Europe (European Hit Radio)	36
UK Singles (OCC)	23
UK Airplay (Music Week)	22
UK Dance (Music Week)	9
UK Club Chart (Music Week) with "Falling"	4

=== Year-end charts ===
Chart (1993)	Position
UK Club Chart (Music Week)	73
