= Don't Be a Stranger (Dina Carroll song) =

1993 single by Dina Carroll

Single by Dina Carroll

from the album So Close
- B-side: "Born to Be (Your Lover)"
- Released: 4 October 1993
- Genre: Pop
- Length: 4:42
- Label: A&M; 1st Avenue
- Songwriters: Coral Gordon; Geoff Gurd
- Producer: Nigel Lowis

Dina Carroll singles chronology
"Express" (1993)	"Don't Be a Stranger" (1993)	"The Perfect Year" (1993)

Audio
- "Don't Be a Stranger" on YouTube

"Don't Be a Stranger" is a song by British singer-songwriter Dina Carroll, released on 4 October 1993 by A&M Records and 1st Avenue as the sixth and final single from her debut album, So Close (1993). The song was written by Coral Gordon and Geoff Gurd, produced by Nigel Lowis, and the strings on the track were performed by the London Session Orchestra. It was a success in the United Kingdom, reaching number three on the UK Singles Chart, and it also reached the top 30 in Ireland and Sweden. On the Eurochart Hot 100, the song peaked at number 11 in November 1993, while outside Europe, it was a number-one hit in Israel. Its accompanying music video was directed by Marcus Nispel and filmed in Czech Republic.

== Critical reception ==
Scottish Aberdeen Evening Express stated that "Don't Be a Stranger" is "sure to be a huge hit." Jon O'Brien from AllMusic called it "epic". In his weekly UK chart commentary, James Masterton described it as "a string laden Las-Vegassy ballad". Alan Jones from Music Week gave it a score of four out of five, writing, "Accompanied by a 40-piece orchestra, Carroll turns in a powerful vocal on a dramatic ballad, which makes full use of its expensive accompaniment." In a 2015 retrospective review, Pop Rescue praised it as "wonderful and absolutely faultless", noting that the singer's vocals are "rich, strong, and flawless." They added that "it was clear that this belter of a song would push her towards recording more big ballads." Phil Shanklin of ReviewsRevues deemed it a "gem from its dramatic introduction", with "a build up that Celine Dion would have been proud of." He concluded, "This is Dina’s best moment."

== Music video ==
A black-and-white music video was filmed to accompany the song in Prague, Czech Republic, featuring such landmarks as Charles Bridge and St. Vitus Cathedral; it was directed by German feature film director and producer Marcus Nispel.

== Track listings ==
7-inch single, Europe; mini-CD single, Japan (1993)
No.	Title	Length
1.	"Don't Be a Stranger" (radio mix)
2.	"Born to Be (Your Lover)" (Nigel Lowis mix edit)

12-inch vinyl, UK (1993)
No.	Title	Length
1.	"Don't Be a Stranger"
2.	"Born to Be (Your Lover)" (Nigel Lowis mix)
3.	"Born to Be (Your Lover)" (Platinum mix)
4.	"Don't Let Me Be the One"

CD single, UK (1993)
No.	Title	Length
1.	"Don't Be a Stranger" (radio mix)
2.	"Born to Be (Your Lover)" (Nigel Lowis mix)
3.	"Don't Let Me Be the One"
4.	"Born to Be (Your Lover)" (Platinum mix)

CD single, Europe (1993)
No.	Title	Length
1.	"Don't Be a Stranger" (LP version)	4:20
2.	"Don't Be a Stranger" (remix)

== Charts ==
=== Weekly charts ===
Chart (1993)	Peak position
Europe (Eurochart Hot 100)	11
Europe (European Hit Radio)	36
Ireland (IRMA)	6
Israel (Israeli Singles Chart)	1
Sweden (Sverigetopplistan)	26
UK Singles (Official Charts)	3
UK Airplay (Music Week)	2
UK Dance (Music Week)	15

=== Year-end charts ===
Chart (1993)	Position
Europe (Eurochart Hot 100)	94
Israel (Israeli Singles Chart)	37
UK Singles (OCC)	23
UK Airplay (Music Week)	12

== Sales and certifications ==
Region	Certification	Certified units/sales
United Kingdom (BPI)	Silver	200,000^{^}
^{^} Shipments figures based on certification alone.

== Release history ==
Region	Date	Format(s)	Label(s)	Ref.
United Kingdom	4 October 1993	7-inch vinyl; 12-inch vinyl; CD; cassette	A&M; 1st Avenue	
Japan	10 November 1993	Mini-CD	A&M	
