= Special Kind of Love =

1992 single by Dina Carroll

Single by Dina Carroll

from the album So Close
- B-side: "If I Knew You Then"
- Released: 28 September 1992
- Genre: Dance-pop; house
- Length: 3:29
- Label: A&M; 1st Avenue
- Songwriters: David Cole; Robert Clivillés
- Producer: Clivillés & Cole

Dina Carroll singles chronology
"Ain't No Man" (1992)	"Special Kind of Love" (1992)	"So Close" (1992)

Music video
- "Special Kind of Love" on YouTube

"Special Kind of Love" is a song by British singer-songwriter Dina Carroll, released in September 1992 by A&M Records and 1st Avenue as the second single from her debut album, So Close (1993). The song was written and produced by American record producers, songwriters, and remixers Clivillés and Cole. Carroll was approached by them and invited to New York to become the first British artist to work with the producers. The song reached number 16 in the UK Singles Chart, number 26 in the Netherlands and number 60 in Germany.

== Critical reception ==
The song received positive reviews from music critics. Larry Flick from Billboard magazine described it as a "fun and infectious pop/dance ditty", remarking that the cut "bears a slight resemblance" to Mariah Carey's hit "Emotions", "without sounding like a carbon-copy." He also felt that Carroll "struts with the vocal prowess of a diva, while producers David Cole and Robert Clivilles dress her in sunny synths and spine-crawling beats." Dave Sholin from the Gavin Report wrote, "'So Close' gave American audiences a mere glimpse into the music and talent of Dina Carroll. This track should take her over the top."

A reviewer from Lennox Herald viewed it as "classy". Andy Beevers from Music Week named "Special Kind of Love" Pick of the Week in the category of Dance, complimenting it as a "superb upbeat soulful house track". James Hamilton from the Record Mirror Dance Update compared it to American singer and songwriter CeCe Peniston in his weekly dance column. Rupert Howe from Select described the track as "reasonably sprightly". Tim Southwell from Smash Hits praised it as "superb". Jonathan Bernstein from Spin named it an "instant hit" and a "Clivilles and Cole sparkler".

== Track listing ==
- 12-inch single, UK (1992)
1. "Special Kind of Love" (Monster club mix)
2. "Special Kind of Love" (Funky Fingers dub)
3. "Special Kind of Love" (D'apella)
4. "Special Kind of Love" (C&C radio 7-inch)
5. "Special Kind of Love" (C&C Special Love club)
6. "Special Kind of Love" (C&C Special Love dub)
- CD single, UK and Europe (1992)
1. "Special Kind of Love" (radio mix) – 3:29
2. "Special Kind of Love" (Monster club mix) – 6:46
3. "Special Kind of Love" (C & C Special Love club) – 6:50
4. "If I Knew You Then" – 4:18

== Charts ==
=== Weekly charts ===
Chart (1992–1993)	Peak position
Canada Top Singles (RPM)	78
Europe (Eurochart Hot 100)	65
Europe (European Dance Radio)	10
Germany (GfK)	60
Netherlands (Dutch Top 40)	36
Netherlands (Single Top 100)	26
UK Singles (Official Charts)	16
UK Airplay (Music Week)	6
UK Dance (Music Week)	6
UK Club Chart (Music Week)	6
US Bubbling Under Hot 100 Singles (Billboard)	3
US Dance Club Play (Billboard)	4

=== Year-end charts ===
Chart (1992)	Position
UK Club Chart (Music Week)	76

== Release history ==
Region	Date	Format(s)	Label(s)	Ref.
United Kingdom	28 September 1992	7-inch vinyl; 12-inch vinyl; CD; cassette	A&M; 1st Avenue	
Japan	25 July 1993	Mini-CD	A&M	
