= Quartz (duo) =

Dance music production duo

- Origin: United Kingdom
- Years active: 1989–1992
- Labels: Vertigo; PolyGram
- Past members: Ronnie Herel; Dave Rawlings

Quartz were a British dance production duo, consisting of Ronnie Herel and Dave Rawlings, known for their collaboration with Clubland on "Let's Get Busy", which went to number one on the US Billboard Hot Dance Club Play chart in 1990.

The album Perfect Timing included the UK dance hit "Meltdown", and also hits with Dina Carroll, most notably a cover of Carole King's "It's Too Late" (No. 8) and "Naked Love (Just Say You Want Me)" (No. 39), released on the Vertigo Records/PolyGram label.

== Discography ==
=== Albums ===
- Perfect Timing (1991)

=== Singles ===
Year	Single	Peak chart positions				Album
Year	Single	UK	AUS	NED	AUT	Album
1989	"Meltdown"	78	—	—	—	Perfect Timing
1990	"We're Comin' at Ya" (featuring Stepz)	65	—	—	—	Perfect Timing
1990	"Let's Get Busy (Pump It Up)" (as Clubland featuring Quartz)	86	139	32	—	Themes from Outer Clubland (Keep It Pumping) (by Clubland)
1991	"It's Too Late" (introducing Dina Carroll)	8	—	—	21	Perfect Timing
1991	"Naked Love (Just Say You Want Me)" (with Dina Carroll)	39	—	—	27	Perfect Timing
1992	"Give Me Desire"	—	—	—	—	Singles only
1992	"Hot for You" (as Clubland featuring Quartz)	—	—	—	—	Singles only
1992	"Distant" (featuring Lisa Jane)	—	—	—	—	Singles only
"—" denotes releases that did not chart or were not released.

== See also ==
- List of number-one dance hits (United States)
- List of artists who reached number one on the US Dance chart
- List of performances on Top of the Pops
