= Ain't No Man (Dina Carroll song) =

1992 single by Dina Carroll

Single by Dina Carroll

from the album So Close
- B-side: "You'll Lose a Good Thing"
- Released: 29 June 1992
- Genre: Disco-pop
- Length: 3:44
- Label: A&M; 1st Avenue
- Songwriters: Dina Carroll; Nigel Lewis
- Producer: Nigel Lowis

Dina Carroll singles chronology
| "It's Too Late" (1991) | "Ain't No Man" (1992) | "Special Kind of Love" (1992) |

"Ain't No Man" is a song by British singer-songwriter Dina Carroll. After singing on two singles with British dance production duo Quartz, she was relaunched as a solo artist with the song, which was released in June 1992 by A&M and 1st Avenue Records as the first single from the singer's debut album, So Close (1993). Lyrically, the song is sung from the view of a woman singing to her man, telling him that there ain't no man that makes her feel like he do. Carroll told in a 1992 interview, "We wanted an anthemic, memorable song. For some reason, Nigel [Lowis] brought up 'Ain't No Mountain High Enough', and that idea evolved into 'Ain't No Man'." The song was well received among music critics and peaked at number 16 in the UK charts, number 26 in the Netherlands and number 63 in Germany. The accompanying music video was directed by Pedro Romhanyi.

== Critical reception ==
Jon O'Brien from AllMusic described the song as "smooth disco-pop". Larry Flick from Billboard magazine felt Carroll has a "wonderful, belting voice that deserves to be embraced in pop radio circles." He added that this track "slams mighty hard". Andy Beevers from Music Week named it "very classy and soulful". Ian McCann from NME felt it's "delivered with some real energy", complimenting it as "classy garage". In a retrospective review, Pop Rescue declared it as "a lovely little piece of up-tempo light pop." Phil Shanklin of ReviewsRevues wrote that it has "the verve and drive of a Ce Ce Peniston hit", praising it as "a big song which needs a big vocal and Dina shines."

Davydd Chong from the Record Mirror Dance Update stated, "An absolute belter in the vocal department, and all others, the tune bounds along proudly, head held high, evoking the spirit of some mid-Seventies soul classic." Adam Higginbotham from Select declared it as "solid, tastefully-cut soul bleeding subtly into brisk garage beats." Johnny Dee from Smash Hits described it as a "luxury, jazzy, summertime wobbler that sounds a bit like a Burt Bacharach tune from the '60s." He added that it "canters along, sweetly splish-splashing" and is "absolutely gorgeous." In 2013, the song was named an Official Chart 'Pop Gem'. They called it a "stand by your man anthem" and "an upbeat testimony that true love really did conquer all".

== Track listings ==
- 12-inch single, Germany (1992)
1. "Ain't No Man" (Lowmac mix)
2. "Ain't No Man" (Master mix)
3. "Ain't No Man" (Mackmaster mix)
4. "You'll Lose a Good Thing"
- CD single, Europe (1992)
1. "Ain't No Man"
2. "You'll Lose a Good Thing"
- CD single, UK and Europe (1992)
1. "Ain't No Man" (Lowmac 7-inch) – 3:44
2. "Ain't No Man" (Lowmac 12-inch) – 5:15
3. "Ain't No Man" (Master mix) – 7:29
4. "You'll Lose a Good Thing" – 3:10

== Charts ==
=== Weekly charts ===
| Chart (1992–1993) | Peak position |
|---|---|
| Australia (ARIA) | 162 |
| Europe (Eurochart Hot 100) | 66 |
| Europe (European Dance Radio) | 3 |
| Germany (GfK) | 63 |
| Israel (Israeli Singles Chart) | 25 |
| Netherlands (Dutch Top 40) | 26 |
| Netherlands (Single Top 100) | 34 |
| UK Singles (Official Charts) | 16 |
| UK Airplay (Music Week) | 12 |
| UK Dance (Music Week) | 6 |
| UK Club Chart (Music Week) | 3 |
| US Dance Club Play (Billboard) | 28 |

=== Year-end charts ===
| Chart (1992) | Position |
|---|---|
| UK Club Chart (Music Week) | 51 |

== Release history ==
| Region | Date | Format(s) | Label(s) | Ref. |
|---|---|---|---|---|
| United Kingdom | 29 June 1992 | 7-inch vinyl; 12-inch vinyl; CD; cassette | A&M; 1st Avenue | |
| Australia | 14 September 1992 | CD; cassette | A&M; Polydor | |
| Japan | 25 January 1993 | Mini-CD | A&M | |
