= So Close (album) =

Studio album by Dina Carroll
- Released: 18 January 1993
- Genres: Jazz-pop; dance; R&B
- Length: 53:47
- Label: A&M
- Producer: Nigel Lowis

Dina Carroll chronology
So Close (1993)	Only Human (1996)

Singles from So Close
- 1. "Ain't No Man" Released: 29 June 1992; 2. "Special Kind of Love" Released: 28 September 1992; 3. "So Close" Released: 23 November 1992; 4. "This Time" Released: 15 February 1993; 5. "Express" Released: 3 May 1993; 6. "Don't Be a Stranger" Released: 4 October 1993

Professional ratings
Review scores
Source	Rating
AllMusic	4/5 stars
Encyclopedia of Popular Music	3/5 stars
Music Week	4/5 stars
NME	5/10
Select	2/5 medals

So Close is the debut album by British soul–dance singer Dina Carroll, released in January 1993 on the A&M label. The album made its chart debut at #2 and remained in the top 20 of the UK Albums Chart for six months. It was shortlisted for the 1993 Mercury Prize. It ended 1993 as the fourth-best-selling album of the year in the United Kingdom, and its success continued into 1994 as it remained in the top 20 for another three months and again rose to a peak of #2. It eventually sold 1.5 million copies and was the highest selling debut album by a British female singer in UK chart history, a record it held until 2001 when it was overtaken by Dido's No Angel.

Among the session musicians on the album are the Blues Brothers' horn section, Mariah Carey's bass player Anthony Jackson and Cissy Houston's New Hope Baptist Choir. On the album release, Music & Media wrote, "Here we have a real soul singer, as sophisticated and sensual as Lisa Stansfield, who fits both the trendy club scene as well as the plush surroundings of chic nightclubbing."

== Singles ==
Three tracks from So Close ("Ain't No Man", "Special Kind of Love" and "So Close") had already been Top 20 hits in the UK Singles Chart during 1992, before the album was released in January 1993. "This Time" and "Express" also became Top 30 hits after the release of the album; then towards the end of 1993 the ballad "Don't Be a Stranger" was released as a single and turned out to be the album's biggest seller, reaching #3 on the UK Singles Chart.

== Track listing ==
- All tracks composed by Dina Carroll and Nigel Lowis unless stated.
1. "Special Kind of Love" (David Cole, Robert Clivillés) 4:42
2. "Hold On" 4:51
3. "This Time" 5:21
4. "Falling" 3:33
5. "So Close" 4:54
6. "Ain't No Man" 3:54
7. "Express" 4:34
8. "Heaven Sent" 3:46
9. "You'll Never Know" 5:56
10. "Don't Be a Stranger" (Coral Gordon, Geoff Gurd) 4:22
11. "Why Did I Let You Go?" 3:29
12. "If I Knew You Then" 4:18

== Personnel ==
- Arranged by [strings] – Nigel Lowis (tracks: 3 9)
- Design – Jeremy Pearce
- Drum programming – CJ Mackintosh (tracks: 4, 6 to 8), Nigel Lowis (tracks: 3 10)
- Engineer, producer [additional production] – Steve Boyer (tracks: 3, 8)
- Guitar – Nigel Lowis (tracks: 4 6 7)
- Keyboards – Nigel Lowis (tracks: 3 4 6 7 10)
- Leader [strings] – David Nadien (tracks: 3, 8)
- Mixed by – CJ Mackintosh (tracks: 2 4 6 7 9), Nigel Lowis (tracks: 2, 4 to 7, 9, 10)
- Mixed by [Assistant] – Howie B. (tracks: 6 7 9), Niall Flynn (tracks: 4, 7, 10, 11)
- Performer [all instruments] – CJ Mackintosh (tracks: 2 9), Nigel Lowis (tracks: 2 5 9)
- Photography by – Simon Fowler (2)
- Producer – CJ Mackintosh (tracks: 2 9), Nigel Lowis (tracks: 2 to 12)
- Saxophone – Jimmy Gallagher (tracks: 2 9)
- Written by – Dina Carroll (tracks: 2 to 9), Nigel Lowis (tracks: 2 to 9)

=== Weekly charts ===
Chart (1993–95)	Peak position
Dutch Albums (Album Top 100)	19
German Albums (Offizielle Top 100)	69
Scottish Albums (Official Charts)	10
UK Albums (Official Charts)	2
UK R&B Albums (Official Charts)	33
Chart (2021)	Peak position
UK Dance Albums (Official Charts)	8

== Year-end charts ==
1993 year-end chart performance for So Close
Chart (1993)	Rank
UK Albums (OCC)	3
