= First Avenue Records =

Defunct British record label

First Avenue Records, First Avenue Management
- Founder: Oliver Smallman
- Status: Defunct
- Distributor: Select-O-Hits
- Country of origin: Britain

First Avenue Records (also known as 1st Avenue and First Avenue Management) was a British record label, publishing company and music management company. The publishing side of the company was acquired by BMG Music Publishing in 2002. After Universal Music Publishing Group's acquisition of BMG Music Publishing in 2004, First Avenue Music then belonged to Universal Music Publishing.

== History ==
The brain behind First Avenue Records was Oliver Smallman. They handled artist management, signed and developed acts, pretty much acting as A&R for record labels. Licensed acts included Quartz, record producers/DJs/remixers Dave Rawlings and Ronnie Herel - PolyGram, Dina Carroll - A&M, Michelle Gayle - RCA, Eternal, Louise and Dana Dawson - EMI, MN8 - Columbia, the Honeyz - Mercury, and Kele Le Roc - Polydor/Wildcard Records, Kes Ingoldsby.

The label launched in 1991 with a dance cover of Carole King's "It's Too Late" by Quartz featuring Dina Carroll which was a hit, reaching No. 8 in the UK Singles Chart and introducing Carroll who later released So Close. These were followed by another million seller, Eternal's Always & Forever. Success continued until the late 1990s with most of their acts being dropped from their labels.

== Artists ==
- Dana Dawson
- Dina Carroll
- Eternal
- Honeyz
- Kéllé Bryan
- Kele Le Roc
- Louise
- Märy Kiani
- Michelle Gayle
- MN8
- Thunderbugs

== See also ==
- List of record labels
